= Koht =

Koht is a Norwegian surname that may refer to

- Halvdan Koht (1873–1965), Norwegian historian and politician
- Karen Grude Koht (1871–1960), Norwegian educationalist, essayist and feminist pioneer
- Paul Koht (1913–2002), Norwegian diplomat
- Paul Steenstrup Koht (1844–1892), Norwegian educator and politician
