= Halvdan Koht =

Norwegian historian and politician (1873–1965)

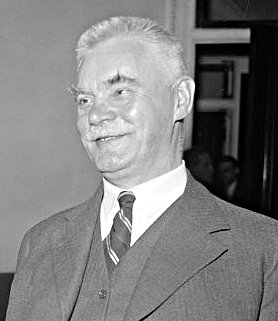
- Koht in 1937.

Minister of Foreign Affairs
- In office 20 March 1935 – 19 November 1940
- Prime Minister: Johan Nygaardsvold
- Preceded by: Johan Ludwig Mowinckel
- Succeeded by: Trygve Lie

Personal details
- Born: 7 July 1873 Tromsø, Troms, Sweden-Norway
- Died: 12 December 1965 (aged 92) Bærum, Akershus, Norway
- Party: Labour; Liberal (formerly)
- Spouse: Karen Grude
- Children: 3, including: Åse Gruda Skard; Paul Koht
- Education: Royal Frederick University (cand.philol. 1896, dr.philos. 1908)
- Known for: Language activist Peace activist

Halvdan Koht (7 July 1873 – 12 December 1965) was a Norwegian historian and politician representing the Labour Party.

Born in the north of Norway to a fairly distinguished family, he soon became interested in politics and history. Starting his political career in the Liberal Party, he switched to the Labour Party around the turn of the 20th century. He represented that party in the Bærum municipal council for parts of the interwar period. He was never elected a member of Parliament, but served nonetheless as Norwegian Minister of Foreign Affairs from 1935 to 1940, as part of the government-in-exile following Germany's invasion of Norway. In the latter capacity he sought to preserve Norway's neutrality in the Second World War, a decision that garnered him political infamy. Growing discontentment with Koht's political decisions ultimately led to his exit from the cabinet. After the war, however, he returned to his academic career track and wrote major works in the 1950s and 1960s.

As an academic he was a professor of history at the Royal Frederick University (now the University of Oslo) from 1910 to 1935, having become a research fellow in 1900 and docent in 1908. Among many honors, he held an honorary degree at the University of Oxford. He was a prolific writer, and touched on numerous subjects during his long academic career. He wrote several biographies; his works on Johan Sverdrup and Henrik Ibsen spanned several volumes each. He became known for syntheses on Norwegian history, and emphasised the roles of peasants and wage labourers as historical agents who found their place in an expanding notion of the Norwegian nation. He was also interested in the United States and its history, and was a pioneer in Norway in this respect.

Koht's views on the Norwegian language also gave him nationwide academic recognition. He championed the Samnorsk language reform, the declared aim of which was to consolidate the two standards of written Norwegian. A reform pushing the formal written language in this direction was indeed implemented in 1938, but historical events led to the failure of this policy. A pertinacious and unyielding advocate of international peace, Koht was a founding member of the Norwegian Peace Association and an ordinary member of the Norwegian Nobel Committee. As an activist and politician he was described as a strong-willed and individualistic person, who nurtured a strong belief in taking an academic and legal perspective on political problems.

== Background ==
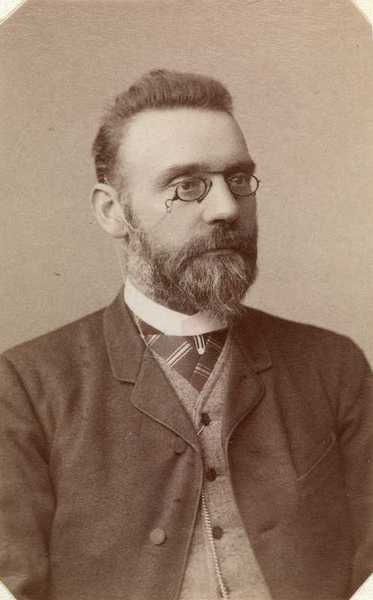
Koht's father Paul Steenstrup Koht (1844–1892)

Halvdan Koht was born on 7 August 1873 in Tromsø, one of the larger cities in Northern Norway. He was the second of four children born to Paul Steenstrup Koht (1844–1892), an educator and politician, and Betty Giæver (1845–1936), a part-time teacher with a penchant for singing, languages and drawing. Betty's antecedents were mixed: she was maternally descended from Northern Germany, yet on her father's side she was of Norwegian origin—a distinguished forebear on that side was her great-grandfather, the civil servant Jens Holmboe from Tromsø. Through the offspring of his maternal grand-uncle, Halvdan Koht was a third cousin of the parliamentarian Ola Krogseng Giæver. In Paul Koht's lineage, Kjeld Stub was a distant ancestor. The name Koht stems from German immigrants to Norway in the 17th century.

He was intended to have the name Joachim, but this was stopped on request from Joachim G. Giæver who voiced his dislike for the name. He was then christened Halfdan, changed to Halvdan some years later. The family lived in Tromsø, where Paul Steenstrup Koht was a headmaster and mayor. The family moved to Skien when Halvdan was twelve years old, where his father again immersed himself in politics: he served as mayor as well as parliamentarian for the Liberal Party. Koht finished school here, taking his examen artium in 1890. His father was among his teachers for a while in Norwegian and Greek. In 1893, one year after the death of Koht's father, the family moved to Bekkelaget, a borough in Aker Municipality. Koht studied at the Royal Frederick University (now the University of Oslo).

In September 1898 in Kristiania, Koht married Karen Elisabeth Grude (1871–1960), an essay writer and women's rights activist one and a half years his senior; they had three children. One child died in infancy, but the remaining two had distinguished careers: Åse Gruda Skard (née Koht) became a child psychologist and Paul Koht an ambassador. Through Åsa, Halvdan Koht was a father-in-law of literary scholar Sigmund Skard and a grandfather of politician and academic Torild Skard, psychologist and ombud Målfrid Grude Flekkøy and politician and organisational leader Halvdan Skard. In the late 1920s, Karen's declining health and Halvdan's preoccupation with his work placed a strain on their relationship. Disenchanted with the loveless union, Koht entered several extramarital friendships in the following decade, often pen friends. During the Second World War, there were rumors about a romantic relationship with his secretary Unni Diesen. After 1945 the relationship to Karen regrew in strength.

== Education ==
Koht graduated with a cand.philol. degree from the Royal Frederick University in 1896. He studied history with geography as a minor subject until 1895; his main history teacher was Gustav Storm. The next examination was in different languages, both classical and modern. Koht had the choice between Ancient Greek and Classical Latin or Norwegian and German (including Norse); he chose the Norwegian and German.

In 1895, after finishing his history studies, he spent three months in the Mediterranean, travelling with three ships, the first from Norway to Venice, the second from Venice to Constantinople, the third back to Norway. He studied German literature during this travels. In December 1896, Koht was finally examined by Sophus Bugge and earned his degree. He was one of just three students to be examined in Norwegian and German in late 1896, and had been the only candidate in history the previous year.

A break from the studies came in the second half of 1892. After his father's death, he could not afford to attend university that semester. He worked briefly as a private tutor in the Skien district, and was paid to write in the newspaper Varden. On returning to his studies he worked as a Kristiania correspondent for the newspaper; eventually he also worked for Päivälehti. In 1901, he took over from Erik Vullum as obituarist and anniversary writer in Verdens Gang. Over the next years, he would contribute extensively to publications such as Den 17de Mai, Syn og Segn, Samtiden, Dagbladet, and Tidens Tegn; these were mostly Liberal or Norwegian nationalist publications.

For some months after graduating Koht worked as an unpaid volunteer at the University Library of Oslo, while also continuing to attend university lectures. He was then given a scholarship, the "Gustav Bruun Endowment" of 1800 kr. The university doubled Koht's award to NOK 3600. From 1897 to 1899 he studied abroad with this fellowship. He studied at the University of Copenhagen, the University of Leipzig and in Paris (École des hautes études, École des Chartes). He was especially influenced by Karl Lamprecht in Leipzig.

From 1899 to 1901, Koht worked as a substitute at the University Library of Oslo, and part-time as a school teacher. He was also engaged by Gustav Storm to help him with publishing the source text Regesta Norvegica. In 1908, after eight years of work, Koht completed the two last volumes of Norsk Forfatter-lexikon, a biographical dictionary of Norwegian writers. However, it was a posthumous work, the principal author—Jens Braage Halvorsen—having died in 1900.

== Academic career ==
=== Appointments and doctorate ===
In 1901 he was appointed as a research fellow at the Royal Frederick University. He rarely had responsibility for any teaching of the students, and since he was often busy with Norsk Forfatter-lexikon he remained a research fellow until 1907. In 1908 he took his dr.philos. degree on the thesis Die Stellung Norwegens und Schwedens im Deutsch-Dänischen Konflikt 1863–1864. Opponents at the dissertation were Ebbe Hertzberg and Yngvar Nielsen.

Koht was then hired as a docent at the university in 1908. Because Koht had internal opponents at the university, the appointment was designated to cover "cultural history" instead of "history". A while later the university changed it to "history". The cabinet changed it back to "cultural history", before the Parliament finally decided on "history". Koht was going to start his tenure as a docent, but argued with Waldemar Christofer Brøgger that he deserved to travel abroad first. From 1908 to 1909 Koht travelled around in the United States, England and Sweden, visiting the peace conferences in London (1908), Chicago (1909) and Stockholm (1910). During these years, his wife, daughter and her nanny lived in Eidsvoll. Koht then returned to Norway and the university, and remained docent until being promoted to professor in 1910. He remained professor until 1935, and also served as the dean of his Faculty from 1912 to 1917.

=== Fields of research ===
Koht faced considerable skepticism among academics when announcing his intentions to study social history from the farmers' perspective. Gustav Storm claimed that farmers in Norway had "done no effort of their own". Ludvig Ludvigsen Daae exclaimed that a person whom Koht wanted to study, the farmer-politician John G. Neergaard, was a "crook ... oh well, trahit sua quemque voluptas". Koht was given 100 kr to do research in Nordmøre on Neergaard. In 1896 professor Cathrinus Bang replied to Koht's wish to study social history: "Yes, do not go out and become a socialist!"

In 1910, Koht completed the dissertation Bonde mot borgar i nynorsk historie, in which he further developed his theories on the role of the farmers in history. Published in the journal Historisk Tidsskrift in 1912, it featured an elaboration on Koht's theory about class and the nation. According to Koht, the community of the nation was expanded in a democratic way when the agrarian movement, then the labour movement, both rose from political passivity to demand a place in the political and national sphere. He wrote about this in the 1910 article Norsk folkesamling as well. The book Norsk bondereisning, published in 1926 as a compilation of Koht's presented material in his university lectures, represented the culmination of Koht's work on the topic of class conflict between the agrarian and the urban population. Koht argued that the peasant movement had abandoned the cause of class interest in favour of universal rights and social reforms. The same perspective had to be applied to the struggle of the labour movement, Koht maintained. An economic background for the farmers' rising was presented in 1912, in Priser og politikk i norsk historie, originally a lecture for the second Norwegian conference of historians. This lecture was also where his historical materialism came to fruition. In 1951 he stated that he "has never thought that the theories could be foundational for a political or social uprising".

Koht's stay in the United States affected his historical views and adaptation of historical materialism, and he also tried to encourage the study of American history in Norway. American culture did not have a particularly high standing in Norway at the time. In school, Koht did not learn proper English. Before he embarked to the US, some historian colleagues insinuated that the country "barely had any history" and was not worth visiting. Koht's first writing on the subject came in 1910 with the lecture Genesis of American Independence. He followed with Pengemakt og arbeid i Amerika ("Monetary Power and Labor in America", 1910), which was based on "People's Academy" lectures, then Amerikansk kultur ("American Culture", 1912) and Den amerikanske nasjonen ("The American Nation", 1920). He would return briefly to American academia during his career, for instance in the autumn of 1930 to hold a course at Harvard University.

Wishing to unite materialism and idealism, Koht became interested in psychology and the role of individuals in history. The latter focus led to his becoming, in the words of his biographer Åsmund Svendsen, "one of the greatest biographers of the 20th century". Inspired by the work with Norsk Forfatter-lexikon, he wrote a life of the author Henrik Wergeland in 1908. Later he published biographies both of Norwegians and foreigners: Otto von Bismarck (1911), Ivar Aasen (1913), Johan Sverdrup in three volumes between 1916 and 1925, Marcus Thrane in 1917, Henrik Ibsen in two volumes in 1928 and 1929, and Haakon VII of Norway in 1943. He also wrote about 400 pieces in the first edition of Norsk biografisk leksikon, a biographical dictionary which would become a preeminent source on important figures in Norwegian history. Between 1909 and 1932 he published letters and original writings of Henrik Ibsen, Bjørnstjerne Bjørnson, Aasmund Olavsson Vinje and Henrik Wergeland. He chaired Kjeldeskriftfondet from 1918 to 1927 and Norsk historisk kjeldeskriftråd from 1923 to 1928, two institutions that dealt with publishing of source texts. He also chaired the Norwegian Historical Association from 1912 to 1927 and 1932 to 1936, the Norwegian Genealogical Society from 1928 to 1940 and the Comité International des Sciences Historiques from 1926 to 1933.

=== Honorary positions ===
Koht became a fellow of the learned society Norwegian Academy of Science and Letters in 1908. Between 1923 and 1939 he was both praeses and vice praeses. He held honorary degrees from the University of Oxford, the University of Chicago and the University of Warsaw. He was decorated by France as a Knight of the Legion of Honour, and in 1952 he received the Gunnerus Medal from the Royal Norwegian Society of Sciences and Letters. He was also a member of the International Society for the History of Medicine.

== Political career ==
=== Early involvement and local politics ===
Koht's father introduced his son to politics, taking him to the Liberal Party national convention in 1891, where he was allowed to enter since he studied at the university. Koht's first political arena was the Norwegian Students' Society, where he vehemently argued that the flag of Norway should not contain the union badge (the "flag case"). In 1893 he left this forum, co-founded a new students' association called Den Frisinnede Studenterforening, and, as the students' association collectively entered the Liberal Party, became a board member of the local party branch in Kristiania. He continued his fight against the union badge, and the union as a whole. In 1905, when the union was dissolved altogether, he agitated for the establishment of a republic, but a plebiscite decided to keep the monarchy.

Though he never adhered to Christianity in his adolescent or adult life, Koht valued the faith in the perfectability of human beings, as prompted "the greatest religions", and he started to feel solidarity with the labour movement and the working classes, leading to the radicalisation of his views: from 1900 he voted for the Norwegian Labour Party, and had four years prior to that began to consider himself a socialist. While living in the United States, he developed a form of historical materialism, which led to a fusion of history scholarship and political views. He viewed the Liberal Party as an important agent in Norwegian history, since it pronounced the rights of the farmers, but he now viewed the working class as the next class to be included in the political life, and specifically through the Labor Party. In Koht's Liberal Party period, he cooperated with some of their more radical members, among them Carl Jeppesen, who later would join the Labour Party. He joined the Labour Party when he returned from the United States and moved to Bærum in 1909. He lived with his family in Stabekk, but commissioned a house in Lysaker in 1910. The house, designed by architect Arnstein Arneberg, was dubbed "Karistua". The university offered him no office, so he had to conduct his research at home.

Koht served as a member of Bærum municipal council in the terms 1916–1919, 1928–1931 and 1931–1934. In 1952 he wrote the 50-year history of Bærum Labour Party.

=== Foreign affairs politician ===
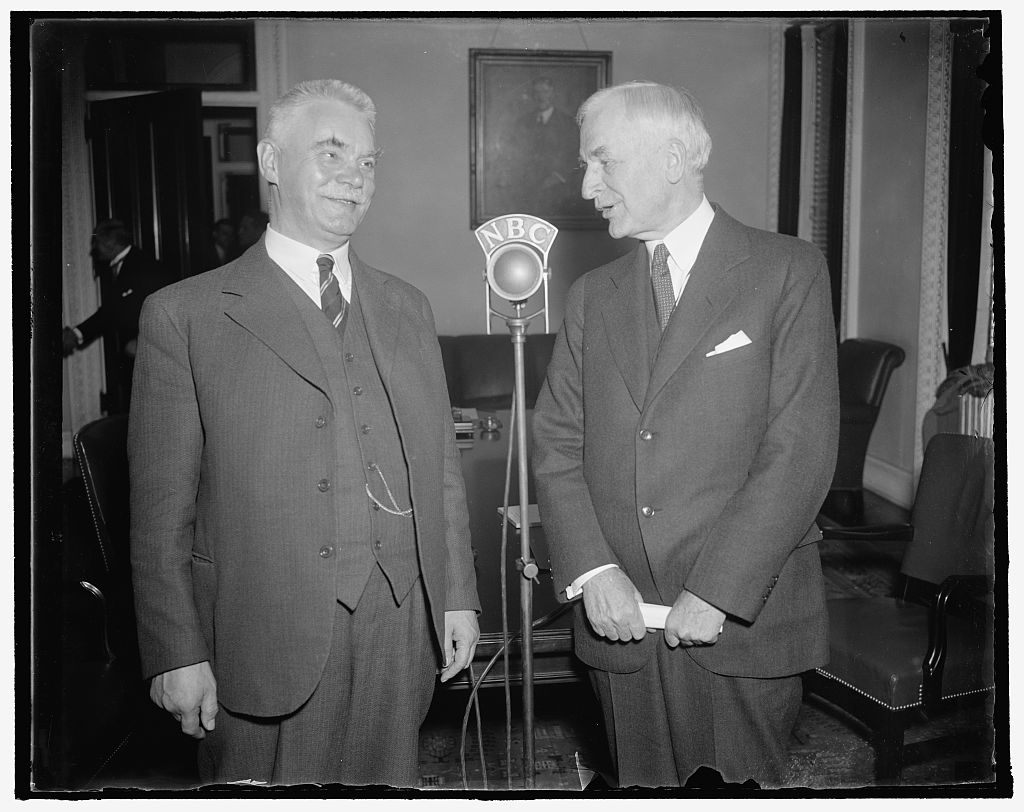
Koht (left) with Cordell Hull, 1937.

Internationally, Koht tried to prop up the institutions that maintained public international law. In 1923 he participated in the arbitrations between Denmark and Norway about the disposition of Eastern Greenland. Sovereignty was claimed by Denmark. Koht teamed up with the conservative politician C. J. Hambro, who had edited Nordmanns-Forbundets tidsskrift to which Koht had contributed. The negotiations led to an agreement on Norwegian trade rights in the area, but a question of sovereignty over Eastern Greenland remained unsolved. In 1931, forces in and outside of the then-Agrarian government annexed "Erik the Red's Land".

In the 1930s Koht became the foremost international politician of the Labour Party. He positioned himself in the Labour Party as the prospective Minister of Foreign Affairs should the party form a government. He did so because fellow historian and Minister of Foreign Affairs in 1928, Edvard Bull Sr., had died, making Koht the "Foreign Minister-designate". The Labour Party also polled well in the 1933 Norwegian parliamentary election, leading them to prepare for office. The Labour government was formed on 20 March 1935. Koht became Minister of Foreign Affairs in Johan Nygaardsvold's Cabinet. Among Koht's first actions as minister was to persuade the Labour Party not to pull Norway out of the League of Nations, something the party had declared that it would do as recently as 1934. In foreign policy matters Koht and Nygaardsvold usually made decisions without consulting the other ministers, merely informing the rest of the cabinet of the decisions that had been made.

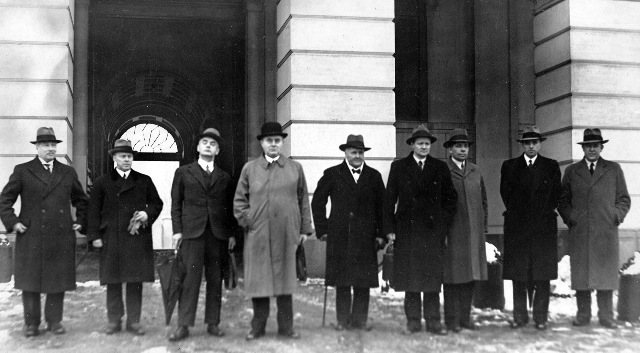
Nygaardsvold's Cabinet. Koht is the third from left, standing between Fredrik Monsen and Johan Nygaardsvold.

After the League of Nations failed as an effective international body, Koht again favoured the strict neutrality policy to which Norway had adhered before the League of Nations membership. For many years, he was reluctant to an expansion of a Norwegian military defense capacity. He did not vehemently and principally oppose such an expansion, and had been quite friendly to the principle of a national defense in the past. His neutrality policy nonetheless put him on the "defense-skeptical" side together with Johan Nygaardsvold and most of his cabinet. Among the more "defense-friendly" in and around the cabinet, not the least from 1936, were Trygve Bratteli, Haakon Lie, Finn Moe, Trygve Lie, Oscar Torp, Martin Tranmæl and Minister of Defense Fredrik Monsen. In 1936 Koht expressed great concern for the consequences of the arms race taking place in Europe, which he felt could easily lead to war.

Following the 1936 outbreak of the Spanish Civil War, the Nygaardsvold Cabinet followed a policy of non-intervention in the conflict between the Spanish government and rebels led by General Franco. Koht's view of the matter was that Norway should not be involved in the conflict in any way; this became the policy of the government for the duration of the civil war. The government soon banned the sale or transfer of Norwegian arms, aircraft and ships to Spain. Koht himself promoted a ban on the use of Norwegian ships to transport arms, ammunition and aircraft to foreign countries in general, to ensure that there could be no Norwegian connection to any such items that were delivered to Spain. The strict non-intervention policy promoted by Koht and Prime Minister Nygaardsvold was heavily criticised by forces within the Labour Party. Martin Tranmæl, a central figure in the apparatus of the Labour Party and the editor of the party newspaper Arbeiderbladet, led the critics of the policy towards the conflict in Spain. Tranmæl and other critics saw the non-intervention policy of the government as giving equal standing to both the elected government of Spain and the rebels. Koht went to great lengths to avoid any direct Norwegian involvement in the conflict, especially trying to block Norwegians from travelling to Spain to join the International Brigades. On 19 September 1936, Koht attempted to have the League of Nations impose a ceasefire in Spain, to be followed by a popular referendum on the country's constitution. Koht's proposal received little support and failed.

For Koht personally the civil war in Spain came close to ending his cabinet career on several occasions. On 9 April 1937, following a series of incidents where Francoist warships intercepted Norwegian vessels sailing on Spanish ports and confiscated both cargoes and ships, and Norwegian protests failing to gain results, Koht made a formal proposal to dispatch the Norwegian minelayer Olav Tryggvason to Spain to protect Norwegian shipping. After the proposal met opposition in parliament and was set to fail, Koht offered to resign. Prime Minister Nygaardsvold refused to accept Koht's resignation, stating that he "would rather be shot than lose Koht". The case came close to causing the whole cabinet's fall in parliament, before it was agreed that it would be dropped. When Koht in 1938 attempted to establish a trade agreement with Franco, he was blocked by his own party and the Norwegian Confederation of Trade Unions. Again requesting to be allowed to resign, Koht stayed after months of debating ended with the party giving the cabinet free rein to do what it saw as best with regards to trade with Franco. By October 1938 Koht had negotiated a trade agreement with Franco. The formal Norwegian recognition of the Franco government as the representative of Spain followed on 31 March 1939, three days after the fall of Madrid to the nationalist forces.

=== Second World War ===
==== Pre-war phase ====
With the outbreak of the Second World War in September 1939, the Norwegian government declared the country neutral in the conflict. Both warring sides subsequently stated that they would respect Norway's neutrality, provided that she protect her neutrality against trespasses by the other side. Koht was clear from early on that Norway should remain neutral, but also that in the event of her being forced to enter the war it was critical that it was on the side of the British.

Over the first months of the Second World War Norwegian neutrality was violated repeatedly in the air and at sea by both warring parties, most dramatically with the 16 February Altmark Incident in Jøssingfjorden. This, along with other incidents, and the lack of a firm Norwegian response, led the warring parties to the impression that Norway could or would not effectively protect her neutrality. Initially the German view of Norwegian neutrality had been one of it being positive for the German war effort, allowing German merchant ships to transport cargo via Norwegian territorial waters without interference from the British.

On 5 April the Allies sent notes to both Norway and Sweden warning that they would take any action necessary if the Germans were allowed to use the neutral countries' territory to their advantage. Koht responded with a speech in which he said that the Allies had nothing to gain by interfering with Norwegian shipping lanes—the British had a more significant trade with Norway than the Germans. The next day the Allies decided to launch a mining operation on the Norwegian coast, and to land troops at Narvik in case the Germans responded to the mining by landing in Norway. Shortly before the mining was carried out, Koht warned the British that no further neutrality violations would be tolerated, and that in the future the Norwegians would respond with force. The Germans too repeatedly violated Norwegian neutrality, and, following a visit from the Norwegian fascist leader Vidkun Quisling to Hitler in December 1939, began serious planning for a possible occupation of Norway. Following the Altmark Incident, Hitler ordered the invasion of Norway. In response to the British mining operation on 8 April 1940, the Norwegian government lodged formal protests with the British and French governments, while secretly remaining set on avoiding war with the Allies at all cost. Koht told the Norwegian parliament that he believed that the Allies were trying to bring Norway into the war. The Allied mining of the Norwegian coast coincidentally distracted the Norwegian government from realising that large German forces had been on their way to invade Norway for several days prior.

==== German invasion and war ====
At the advent of the Nazi German Operation Weserübung, the invasion of Norway of 9 April 1940, Germany sent the envoy Curt Bräuer to present demands of capitulation. Koht personally met with Bräuer, and rejected his demands and threats of war, stating that "war had already started". Koht and the cabinet fled Norway's capital in the morning of 9 April. Even though Koht rejected Bräuer's initial contact, he did convince the cabinet to listen to further German proposals for negotiations later the same day. All Norwegian negotiations with the Germans ended after a failed attempt to capture the Norwegian king and government in Midtskogen early on 10 April. Koht was willing to take up the fight against the invaders. He wrote several key speeches, some of which were delivered by King Haakon VII, to convey staunch resistance to the German demands.

Vital to the Norwegian effort to try to halt the German advance was assistance from the Allies, which Koht requested in the early hours of 9 April, although skeptical of the potential of Allied aid. When the rest of the government fled from Molde to Tromsø, landing on 1 May, Koht and Ljungberg (Minister of Defense) continued from there with the cruiser HMS Glasgow to London. Here, from 5 May they negotiated with British government representatives (Lord Halifax, Chamberlain and Admiral Philips) on British aid to Norway. Koht also made a radio speech from London on the BBC, broadcasting to Norway, and a speech on American radio. On 8 and 9 May he met Reynaud, Gamelin and Daladier in Paris. The Norwegian Ministers departed from London on 11 May, arriving back in Norway on 17 May. The talks with the Allies resulted in concrete promises and plans for large French reinforcements for the Norwegian front. These plans were however abandoned by the Allies on 24 May 1940, following the worsening situation for the Allies in France, and an evacuation decided. Koht was informed by British Minister to Norway Sir Cecil Dormer on 1 June that the Allied Forces had decided to retreat from Norway, owing to the difficult situation at the Western Front.

In response to the Allied decision to evacuate, the cabinet sent Koht to Luleå in Sweden to try to reinvigorate a previously rejected plan to create a demarcation line between the Germans and Norwegian in Northern Norway. Swedish troops were planned to occupy Narvik. The plan was named the Mowinckel plan, after its initiator, the former prime minister Johan Ludwig Mowinckel. During a meeting with the Swedish minister of foreign affairs, Christian Günther, who was to act as a middle man with Germans in relation to the plan, Koht revealed that the Allies were about to evacuate Norway. Although Günther never revealed the evacuation plans to the Germans, Koht was heavily criticised for doing so by his colleagues upon his return to Norway.

==== In exile ====
The cabinet eventually fled the country on 7 June. Koht landed in London on 19 June 1940, now heading the Ministry of Foreign Affairs in exile. Norway was now a close ally of the United Kingdom, but Koht was seen as clinging somewhat to his neutrality policy, and not embracing the alliance with the United Kingdom enough. From the autumn of 1940, Trygve Lie championed a change in policy which meant seeking lasting allies in the western world. Koht viewed this as "distrust". A schism between him and the rest of the cabinet grew as it also became known that Koht's Ministry of Foreign Affairs had received reports of a possible forthcoming assault on Norway, without Koht having informed the cabinet thoroughly. Furthermore, there was discontent over Koht's decision to establish the headquarters of the Ministry of Foreign Affairs in exile in Bracknell, several miles west of the cabinet headquarters.

Koht was granted leave of absence on 19 November 1940, and ultimately left the post of Minister of Foreign Affairs on 20 February 1941, being succeeded by Trygve Lie. Koht decided to travel to Canada and then the United States. He lived with his daughter Åsa and her family in Washington, DC, returning to Norway after the end of the Second World War.

=== Political legacy ===
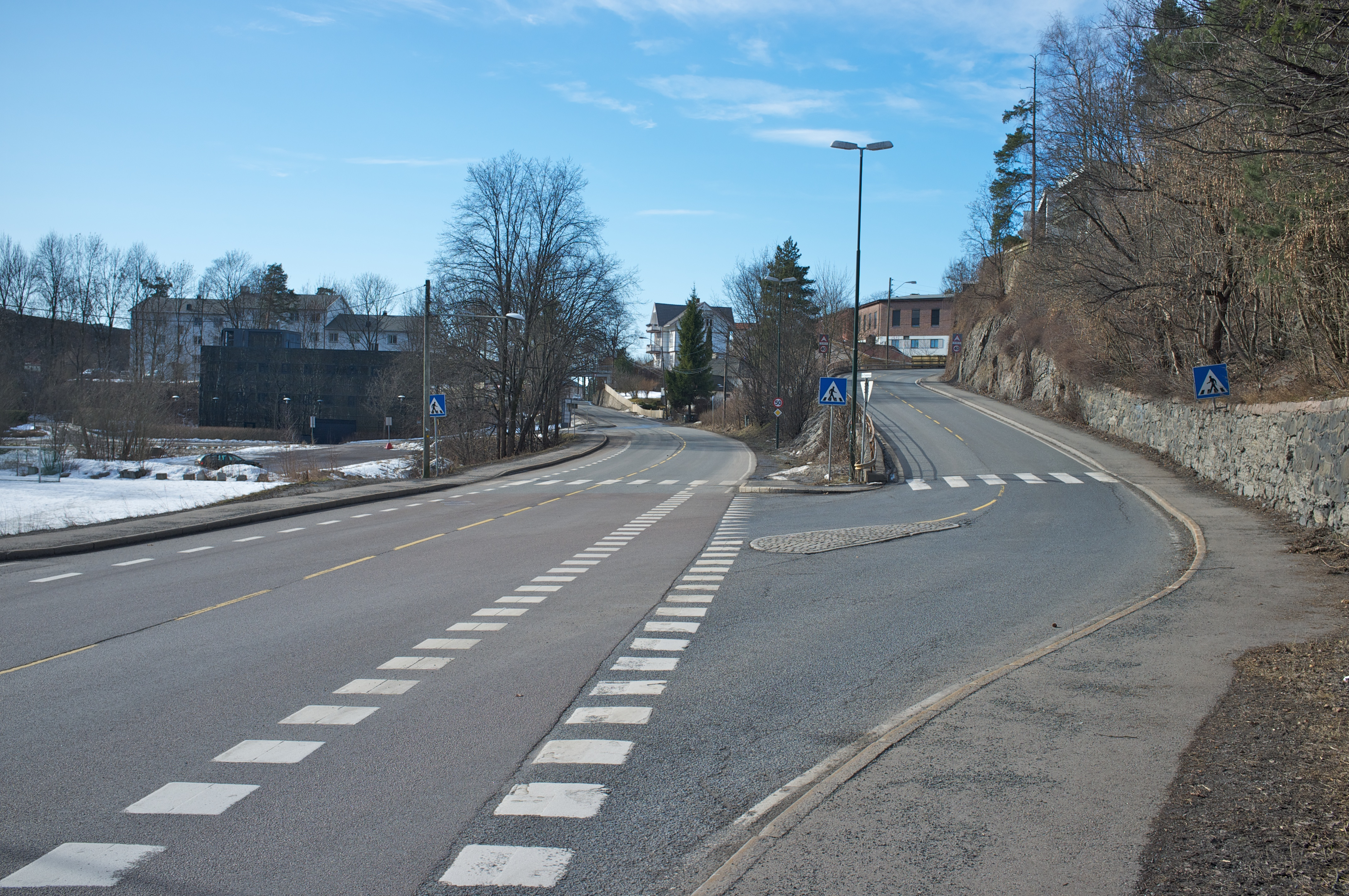
Professor Kohts vei (lit. "Professor Koht's street") in Bærum was named after Halvdan Koht in 1967.

Trygve Lie, who after the war had become the first Secretary-General of the United Nations, characterised Koht in his memoirs as an expert on foreign affairs, but introverted. He had relatively little contact with other politicians, kept to himself to study in peace, and spent much time on his extensive writing. Koht reportedly preferred to solve a problem by himself instead of involving co-workers and employees, even the experts in the Ministry of Foreign Affairs. His way of thinking was logical and rational, but he allegedly nurtured an "exaggerated belief in paragraphs" and a "dogmatic belief in international law", and wrongly thought that other countries would obey formal regulations at most times. Koht had few or no alternatives to his neutrality policy, and in many ways he based his entire career in foreign affairs on that policy. Trygve Lie claimed that before the Second World War, the neutrality policy had "become a religion" for Koht.

Koht's role in the weak and unorganised defense against Operation Weserübung was debated during and after the occupation. After the World War, a commission named Undersøkelseskommisjonen av 1945 ("Scrutiny Commission of 1945") was set to scrutinise the actions of the Norwegian government in 1940. It concluded with a partial criticism of Koht's dispositions. After receiving Undersøkelseskommisjonen's analysis, Koht volunteered to undergo an Impeachment trial. The Parliament of Norway did not find it necessary, and no such trial took place.

Since Koht lived in Lysaker, Bærum Municipality wanted to honor him by naming a street after him. When the street was named in 1967, Koht was still controversial. The street was therefore named Professor Kohts vei ("Professor Koht's Road") to emphasise his academic, rather than his political career.

== Language views ==
Hailing from Tromsø, Koht spoke a Northern Norwegian dialect in his early life. In Skien his dialect provoked negative reactions from his peers. He was inspired by the dialects of Skien's surroundings (Telemark); from 1891 he wrote the "rural" language form Landsmål with strong tinges of Bø dialect. Before this he had attempted to write both "Knudsen Riksmål" and "Aasen Landsmål", but neither stuck. Early publications on the Norwegian language controversy were Det norske målstrævs historie (1898) and Det vitskapelege grunnlage for målstræve (1900). He became a board member of the Landsmål-based publishing house Det Norske Samlaget, and edited the Landsmål periodical Syn og Segn from 1901 to 1908, until 1905 together with Rasmus Flo. He chaired Noregs Mållag, an association the propagation of Landsmål, from 1921 to 1925. In 1929, Landsmål was renamed Nynorsk.

Koht spoke of language in a social context in general and of the class struggle in particular. He eventually used the Labour Party as a vehicle for his language activism, especially after being asked by the party to write Arbeidarreising og målspørsmål in 1921. In it, he synthesised the class struggle and language struggle in Norway, and because he was an integrationist he wanted a popular gathering around one written language. Koht became a member of Rettskrivingsnemnda in 1934, and in 1936 the Labour Party agreed that a language reform should be carried out, moving the two language forms Bokmål and Nynorsk closer to one another. The language reforms took place in 1938 and promoted the Samnorsk ideal. The reforms were reversed in 1941 under Nazi rule; the original changes were reinstated after the end of the occupation of Norway by Nazi Germany. According to historian Kåre Lunden, Koht was much hated by many because of his language reforms, which were routinely perceived as attacks and degradations on their preferred language. His ideals were dubbed "det kohtske knot", i.e. "the Kohtian mishmash". For his own part, Koht often used spellings that contrasted with both Nynorsk and Bokmål. The definite article, which is formally the suffix "-et", was substituted with the suffix "-e", such as in the titles of his publications Det vitskapelege grunnlage for målstræve and Sosialdemokratie.

== Peace activism ==
Koht's first travel abroad was in 1890, when he accompanied his father as well as Hans Jacob Horst and John Theodor Lund to an interparliamentary peace conference in London. In 1895 he was a founding member and board member of the Norwegian Peace Association, serving as chairman from 1900 to 1902. From 1901 to 1902 he edited his own monthly periodical named Fredstidende ("Peace Times").

The Peace Association was dominated by Liberal Party politicians—from a Marxist perspective, "bourgeois" people. Historian Nils Ivar Agøy had noted that the socialists who were active in the bourgeois peace movement—the most prominent being Koht, Adam Egede-Nissen and Carl Bonnevie—were "radicalised sons of the bourgeoisie". This meant that they were "capable of asserting themselves among the ship-owners and county governors in the board" of the Norwegian Peace Association. Koht also followed his own goals during his first period as chairman. He wanted to tie the "apolitical" peace movement closer to the labour movement, to create "economic justice" and to employ the use of arbitration in labour conflicts. These goals were not embraced by all of the members, particularly not those who wanted to keep the Peace Association politically neutral. A larger problem, however, was that Koht rated Norwegian nationalism higher than pacifism. He had thus carried out his compulsory military service "with fervor", notes Agøy. Koht demanded that the Peace Association did not resist to an armed defense of the "fatherland". The national convention in 1902 refused to acknowledge this principle, and Koht therefore resigned his membership. He was followed by others, as a result of a schism in the Peace Association between the pacifists and the more pragmatic peace activists. Koht has also been assessed as an ineffective organisational leader. The defense question more or less solved itself when the Swedish-Norwegian union was peacefully dissolved in 1905. Koht later returned to the Peace Association to serve as a board member from 1910 to 1912.

He became a member of Institut International de la Paix in 1913. He was a consultant for the Norwegian Nobel Institute from 1904 to 1913, with the task of examining proposed candidates for the Nobel Peace Prize. From 1918 to 1942 he served on the Norwegian Nobel Committee. In 1931, he gave the Award Ceremony Speech for the Nobelists Jane Addams and Nicholas Murray Butler, but was absent in the decisive meeting in 1936 that awarded the Nobel Peace Prize to Carl von Ossietzky. He was also absent while serving as Minister of Foreign Affairs, not wishing to combine the two roles. He returned briefly afterwards, before leaving again in 1942. Another reason for his inactivity was that he had not lived in Norway since 1940, but either way the Prize was not awarded in any of the years from 1939 to 1943.

Koht's academic writing also encompassed the peace issue. His books on the subject include Histoire du mouvement de la paix en Norvège ("History of the Peace Movement in Norway", 1900) and Fredstanken i Noregs-sogo ("The Notion of Peace in the History of Norway", 1906).

== Post-political life ==
Having stepped down from the exiled cabinet in 1941, Koht lived in the United States for the remainder of the war. There he continued his literary production; however, the books Norway Neutral and Invaded (1941) and The Voice of Norway (1944) were both released in London. The first book dealt directly with the advent of war in Norway, and was released in Swedish in the same year. The second book, written together with his son-in-law Sigmund Skard, dealt more with older history and the literature of Norway. It was released in Swedish in 1944 and Norwegian in 1948. Koht returned to Norway at the end of war.

Upon returning to Norway, Koht published three books on the war-time events in Norway: For fred og fridom i krigstid 1939–1940, Frå skanse til skanse. Minne frå krigsmånadene i Noreg 1940 and Norsk utanrikspolitikk fram til 9. april 1940. Synspunkt frå hendingstida, all of which were released in 1947. These memoir-like books have been analysed as putting a self-apologetic message forth. His political career was effectively ended, but some of his ideas had prevailed. For instance, his analysis of the class situation in Norway became a part of the general social-democratic ideology of the post-war years.

Despite not holding the professor chair any longer, Koht continued his academic writing; his principal work from the post-war epoch was the six-volume Kriseår i norsk historie. The six volumes each describe a decisive moment in Norwegian history. The first volume, released in 1950, centers on "Vincens Lunge contra Henrik Krummedige". The second volume (1951) describes Olav Engelbriktsson and Norway's descent into dependency to Denmark in 1537. The third and fourth volumes, released in 1952 and 1955, are about medieval kings: Sverre I and Harald I. The fifth volume (1956) focuses on "Queen Margaret and the Kalmar Union". The sixth and final volume (1960) chronicles the years from 1657 to 1661, when Denmark (and thus Norway) transitioned into an absolute monarchy.

Koht died on 12 December 1965 in Bærum. He was buried at Nordre gravlund in Oslo. Two works by Koht have been released posthumously: the memoirs Minne frå unge år in 1968 and the diary Rikspolitisk dagbok 1933–1940 in 1985. His son-in-law Sigmund Skard wrote a biography of him, Mennesket Halvdan Koht ("Halvdan Koht the Man") in 1982.

== References and notes ==
Notes

Bibliography

- Agøy, Nils Ivar (2000). "Et floket partnerskap. Fredsbevegelsen og arbeiderbevegelsen til 1940". Arbeiderhistorie (in Norwegian): 90.
- Kjærheim, Steinar (1985). "Innleiing". In Koht, Halvdan (ed.). Rikspolitisk dagbok 1933–1940 (in Norwegian). Oslo: Tiden Norsk Forlag. ISBN 82-10-02741-7.
- Koht, Halvdan (1951). Historikar i lære (in Norwegian). With the Norwegian Historical Association. Oslo: Grøndahl & Søn. OCLC 15006430.
- Koht, Halvdan (1952). Bærum arbeiderparti 1902–1952 (in Norwegian). Oslo: Bærum Labor Party. OCLC 475064528.
- Lie, Trygve (1955). Leve eller dø (in Norwegian). Oslo: Tiden.
- Lunde, Henrik O. (2009). Hitler's pre-emptive war: The Battle for Norway, 1940. Newbury: Casemate Publishers. ISBN 978-1-932033-92-2.
- Moen, Jo Stein; Rolf Sæther (2009). Tusen dager – Norge og den spanske borgerkrigen 1936–1939 (in Norwegian). Oslo: Gyldendal Norsk Forlag. ISBN 978-82-05-39351-6.
- Parliament of Norway (1947). Innstilling fra Undersøkelseskommisjonen av 1945. Bilag (in Norwegian). Vol. 2. Oslo: Aschehoug. Archived from the original on 20 August 2006.
- Pryser, Tore (1988). Klassen og nasjonen 1935–1946. Volume four of Arbeiderbevegelsens historie i Norge (in Norwegian). Oslo: Tiden. pp. 219–220. ISBN 82-10-02754-9.
- Rønning, Mats; Ringsby, Per Jostein (2010). "Strid om fred. Norges fredsforening 1895–1914". In Helle, Idar; et al. (eds.). Historier om motstand. Kollektive bevegelser i det 20. århundret (in Norwegian). Oslo: Abstrakt. pp. 35–53. ISBN 978-82-7935-304-1.
- Skard, Åse Gruda (1974). "Datter av 'lovende ung videnskabsmand'". Det første halvsekel. Bilder fra norsk barndom (in Norwegian). Oslo: Gyldendal. pp. 122–143. ISBN 82-05-06524-1.
- Ørvik, Nils (1960). Solidaritet eller nøytralitet?. Volume one of Sikkerhetspolitikken 1920–1939 (in Norwegian). Oslo: J. G. Tanum.

Further reading

- Riste, Olav (1973). London-regjeringa: Norge i krigsalliansen 1940–1945 (in Norwegian). Vol. 1. Oslo: Det Norske Samlaget.
- Riste, Olav (1979). London-regjeringa: Norge i krigsalliansen 1940–1945 (in Norwegian). Vol. 2. Oslo: Det Norske Samlaget.
- Skard, Sigmund (1982). Mennesket Halvdan Koht (in Norwegian). Oslo: Det Norske Samlaget. OCLC 10021714.
- Svendsen, Åsmund (2013). Halvdan Koht. Veien mot framtiden (in Norwegian). Oslo: Cappelen Damm. ISBN 9788202413941.
- Sydengen, Fred Ivan (2003). Halvdan Koht, fredstanken og forholdet til stormaktene 1935–1939. Mellom nedrustning og territoriell ekspansjon (in Norwegian). Oslo: University of Oslo (master's thesis).

Political offices
Preceded by Johan Ludwig Mowinckel	Minister of Foreign Affairs; 1935–1940	Succeeded by Trygve Lie
Cultural offices
Preceded by Olaus Islandsmoen	Chairman of Noregs Mållag; 1921–1925	Succeeded by Knut Liestøl
Academic offices
Preceded by Yngvar Nielsen	Chairman of the Norwegian Historical Association; 1912–1927	Succeeded by Edvard Bull Sr.
Preceded by Edvard Bull Sr.	Chairman of the Norwegian Historical Association; 1932–1936	Succeeded by Sverre Steen
Preceded by S. H. Finne-Grønn	Chairman of the Norwegian Genealogical Society; 1929–1940	Succeeded by Sigurd Segelcke Meidell
