= Hangeland =

Hangeland is a Norwegian surname. Notable people with the surname include:

- Brede Hangeland (born 1981), Norwegian footballer
- Siri Hangeland (born 1952), Norwegian feminist, civic leader and politician
