= Paul Koht =

Norwegian diplomat (1913–2002)

Paul Gruda Koht (7 December 1913 – 26 March 2002) was a Norwegian diplomat.

== Personal life ==
He was born in Bærum as a son of Halvdan Koht (1873–1965) and Karen Grude Koht (1871–1960). He was a brother of Åse Gruda Skard and grandson of Paul Steenstrup Koht and Martin Adolf Grude; through his sister he was a brother-in-law of Sigmund Skard and uncle of Halvdan Skard, Målfrid Grude Flekkøy and Torild Skard.

In January 1938 he married the architect Grete Sverdrup (1913–1996).

== Career ==
He finished his secondary education at Stabekk in 1932, and graduated from the University of Oslo (Royal Frederick University) in 1938 with the cand.jur. degree. He also studied briefly at the London School of Economics and in Paris. In 1938 he was hired as a secretary in the Ministry of Foreign Affairs, which was headed by his father. He was stationed at the Norwegian legation in București for some time, but left in November 1939. Following the German attack on Norway in April 1940 he briefly served as liaison for French forces fighting at Narvik, before serving as a diplomat in London, Tokyo and New York City.

After the war Paul Koht became assistant secretary, in 1947. He served as chargé d'affaires in Portugal from 1950 to 1951, then at OEEC and NATO from 1951 to 1953. In 1953 he was appointed deputy under-secretary of state in the Ministry of Foreign Affairs. He remained there until serving as chargé d'affaires in Denmark from 1956 to 1957, and the Norwegian ambassador to the United States from 1958 to 1962, to West Germany from 1963 to 1968, to the United Kingdom from 1968 to 1975 and to Denmark from 1975 to 1982.

He died in March 2002 in Oslo, and was buried at Nordre gravlund in Oslo.

Diplomatic posts
Preceded by Wilhelm Thorleif von Munthe af Morgenstierne	Norwegian Ambassador to the United States; 1958–1962	Succeeded by Hans Engen
Preceded by Hersleb Vogt	Norwegian Ambassador to West Germany; 1963–1968	Succeeded by Søren Christian Sommerfelt
Preceded by Arne Skaug	Norwegian Ambassador to the United Kingdom; 1968–1975	Succeeded by Frithjof Jacobsen
