= Arne Lie =

Arne Lie may refer to:

- Arne Lie (actor) (1921–1982), Norwegian actor
- Arne Brun Lie (1925–2010), Norwegian-American author
- Arne Lie (politician) (1927–1996), Norwegian politician
