= Kjellaug Pettersen =

Norwegian politician (1934–2012)

26th President of the Norwegian Association for Women's Rights
- In office 1994–1998
- Preceded by: Bjørg Krane Bostad
- Succeeded by: Siri Hangeland

Special adviser in the Ministry of Education

Personal details
- Born: 5 January 1934
- Died: 11 November 2012 (aged 78)
- Occupation: Government official and politician

Kjellaug Pettersen (born 5 January 1934, Andøya - died 11 November 2012) was a Norwegian senior government official, politician and feminist.

She worked as a teacher and headmistress of Bygdøy School from 1979 to 1988. In 1981 she was appointed by the Ministry of Education as a member of an expert committee on gender equality, and in 1991 she became director of the gender equality secretariat within the Ministry of Education. She later served as a special adviser in the Ministry of Education.

She was a co-founder of the Women's University in 1983 and was president of the Norwegian Association for Women's Rights from 1994 to 1998. She was a deputy member of the Ministry of Foreign Affairs' committee on human rights from 1994 to 1995.

== Publications ==
- Framtidsdrømmen og virkeligheten : jenter og gutter velger utdanning og yrke, Friundervisningens forlag, 1990, ISBN 82-7020-297-5
- Tøffe gutter, stille jenter; hjemme og på skolen, Aventura, 1987, ISBN 82-588-0442-1
