= Nic Knudtzon =

Norwegian telecommunications engineer (1922–2013)

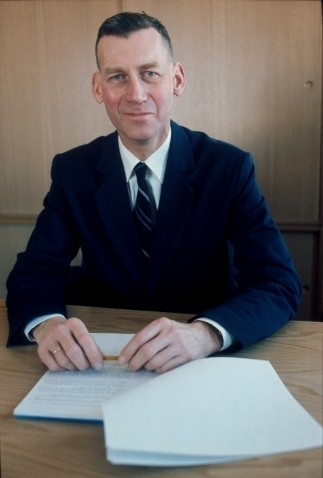
Knudtzon in 1974

Nicolay Heinrich Knudtzon (19 March 1922 – 7 February 2013) was a Norwegian telecommunications engineer.

He graduated in electronic engineering from the Norwegian Institute of Technology in 1947. He was hired at the Norwegian Defence Research Establishment, and remained here for several years except for studies at the MIT in 1948. He worked with developing radio links; the first in Norway opened in 1954 between Oslo and Bergen.

In 1955, he was hired at the newly established SHAPE Technical Centre as communications director. While working in the Netherlands he took a doctorate at the Delft University of Technology. In 1967, he was hired as director of the new Televerkets Forskningsinstitutt at Kjeller, the research establishment of the telecommunications monopolist Televerket. He remained so for 25 years. Partially based on the contributions from TF research, Televerket in the 1990s transformed to the modern corporation Telenor.

Knudtzon was also a council member of NTNF. He was a fellow of the Norwegian Academy of Technological Sciences. He was a great-grandson of Ludvig Ludvigsen Daae, and as such published Daae's memoirs in 2003.

He was decorated as a Knight, First Class of the Order of St. Olav in 1993. He died on 7 February 2013, aged 90.
