= Torild Skard =

Norwegian psychologist and politician

Torild Skard MP
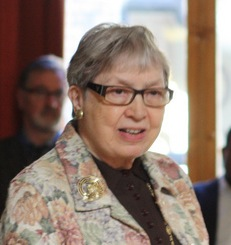
- Torild Skard speaking in the Storting in 2011

Member of the Storting
- In office 1 October 1973 – 30 September 1977
- Constituency: Akershus

President of the Lagting
- In office 9 October 1973 – 30 September 1977
- Vice President: Egil Aarvik
- Preceded by: Egil Aarvik
- Succeeded by: Margit Tøsdal

Director for Questions relating to the Status of Women of UNESCO
- In office 1984–1986

Regional Director for West and Central Africa at UNICEF
- In office 1994–1998
- Preceded by: Stanislas Adotevi
- Succeeded by: Rima Salah

Chairman of the UNICEF Executive Board
- In office 1988–1989
- Preceded by: Makoto Taniguchi
- Succeeded by: Margarita Dieguez

29th president of the Norwegian Association for Women's Rights
- In office 2006–2013
- Preceded by: Berit Kvæven
- Succeeded by: Margunn Bjørnholt

Personal details
- Born: 29 November 1936 (age 89) Oslo, Norway
- Party: Socialist Left
- Spouse(s): Berge Furre (m. 1962; div. 1965); Kåre Øistein Hansen (m. 1994–2012; his death)
- Parent(s): Sigmund Skard; Åse Gruda Skard
- Profession: Psychologist
- Committees: Standing Committee on Justice (deputy chair)

Torild Skard (born 29 November 1936) is a Norwegian psychologist, politician for the Socialist Left Party, a former deputy permanent secretary at the Ministry of Foreign Affairs and a former chairman of UNICEF.

She served as a Member of Parliament for Akershus, president of its Upper Chamber and deputy chair of the Standing Committee on Justice from 1973 to 1977. She served as director for Questions relating to the Status of Women of UNESCO 1984–1986 and regional director for West and Central Africa at UNICEF 1994–1998. She was chairman of the international UNICEF executive board 1988–1989. She has also served as director-general for development cooperation, deputy permanent secretary responsible for development cooperation and special adviser in the Ministry of Foreign Affairs, and has been a senior researcher at the Norwegian Institute of International Affairs.

Skard has been described as "an icon of Norwegian feminism." She was president of the Norwegian Association for Women's Rights from 2006 to 2013, and also served as vice chair of the Forum for Women and Development during this period. She has written several books, including Continent of Mothers, Continent of Hope (2003) on African development and Women of Power (2014) on female heads of state or government worldwide.

== Personal life ==
She was born in Oslo as a daughter of professor Sigmund Skard (1903–1995) and associate professor Åse Gruda Skard (1905–1985). She is a sister of Anne Skard, Halvdan Skard and Åsmund Skard and twin sister of Målfrid Grude Flekkøy. Through her mother, she is a granddaughter of the historian and former minister of foreign affairs Halvdan Koht and the feminist pioneer Karen Grude Koht, and through her father she is a granddaughter of the superintendent of schools Matias Skard and Gyda Skard, and niece of Torfinn, Bjarne, Eiliv and Olav Skard. She is also a niece of Paul Koht.

From 1962 to 1965 Skard was married to historian, theologian and politician Berge Furre (1937–2016). In 1977 she became a cohabitant with politician Kåre Øistein Hansen (1927–2012), and they married in 1994.

== Career ==
Skard had her first schooling in Washington, D.C., from 1942 to 1945, since her family was exiled because of the German occupation of Norway. After the war she completed her primary and lower secondary education at Lysaker and Stabekk near Oslo, before finishing her secondary education at Hegdehaugen in Oslo in 1954. After studies at the Cours de Civilisation Française de la Sorbonne in Paris and Sagene Teacher's College in Oslo she graduated with the cand.mag. degree in French, education and sociology from the University of Oslo in 1962. She also chaired the Students' Council, from 1961 to 1962. In 1965 she took the cand.paed. degree. She was a lecturer at the State Teacher Training College for Special Education from 1965 to 1972 and lecturer at the University of Tromsø from 1972 to 1978. She was also subeditor of the Norwegian Educational Journal from 1966 to 1972, and from 1968 to 1969 she researched for the Norwegian Institute for Social Research. In 1975 she became an approved psychologist. From 1978 to 1984 she was a researcher at the Institute of Work Psychology at the Work Research Institutes.

However, her career as a researcher was interrupted by her political career. She was originally a member of the Labour Party, but as leader of the Socialist Student Group she was excluded in 1959 together with most of the group, because they were opposed to the Labour Party's western-aligned foreign policy and Norway's NATO membership. She co-founded the Socialist People's Party in 1961. She was secretary for the party parliamentary group from 1962 to 1963, and served as a deputy representative to the Parliament of Norway during the term 1965–1969. In 1971 she was elected member of Oslo city council, and from 1973 to 1977 she was a member of Parliament for the constituency Akershus. During this term she served as the President of the Lagting - Upper House and deputy chair of the Standing Committee on Justice. She was delegate for Norway to the UN General Assembly (1974) and delegate for Norway to the World Conference for the International Women's Year (1975). She was the first woman President of the Lagting.

From 1984 to 1986 Skard was Director for Questions relating to the Status of Women in UNESCO, Paris. She was then deputy under-secretary of state of the Norwegian Ministry of Development Cooperation from 1986 to 1989. When that Ministry was merged into the Ministry of Foreign Affairs, Skard retained her position as deputy under-secretary of state there. She was the first woman deputy under-secretary of state in both these Ministries. In 1991 she was promoted to assisting permanent under-secretary of state for development cooperation in the Ministry of Foreign Affairs, a position she held until 1994. From 1994 to 1998 she was Regional Director for West and Central Africa at UNICEF in Abidjan. She was Chairman of the UNICEF Executive Board at the international level from 1988 to 1989. She was a special adviser at the Norwegian Ministry of Foreign Affairs from 1999 to 2003, and a senior researcher at the Norwegian Institute of International Affairs until 2011. She has also lectured on Leadership, Women and the UN at the United Nations System Staff College.

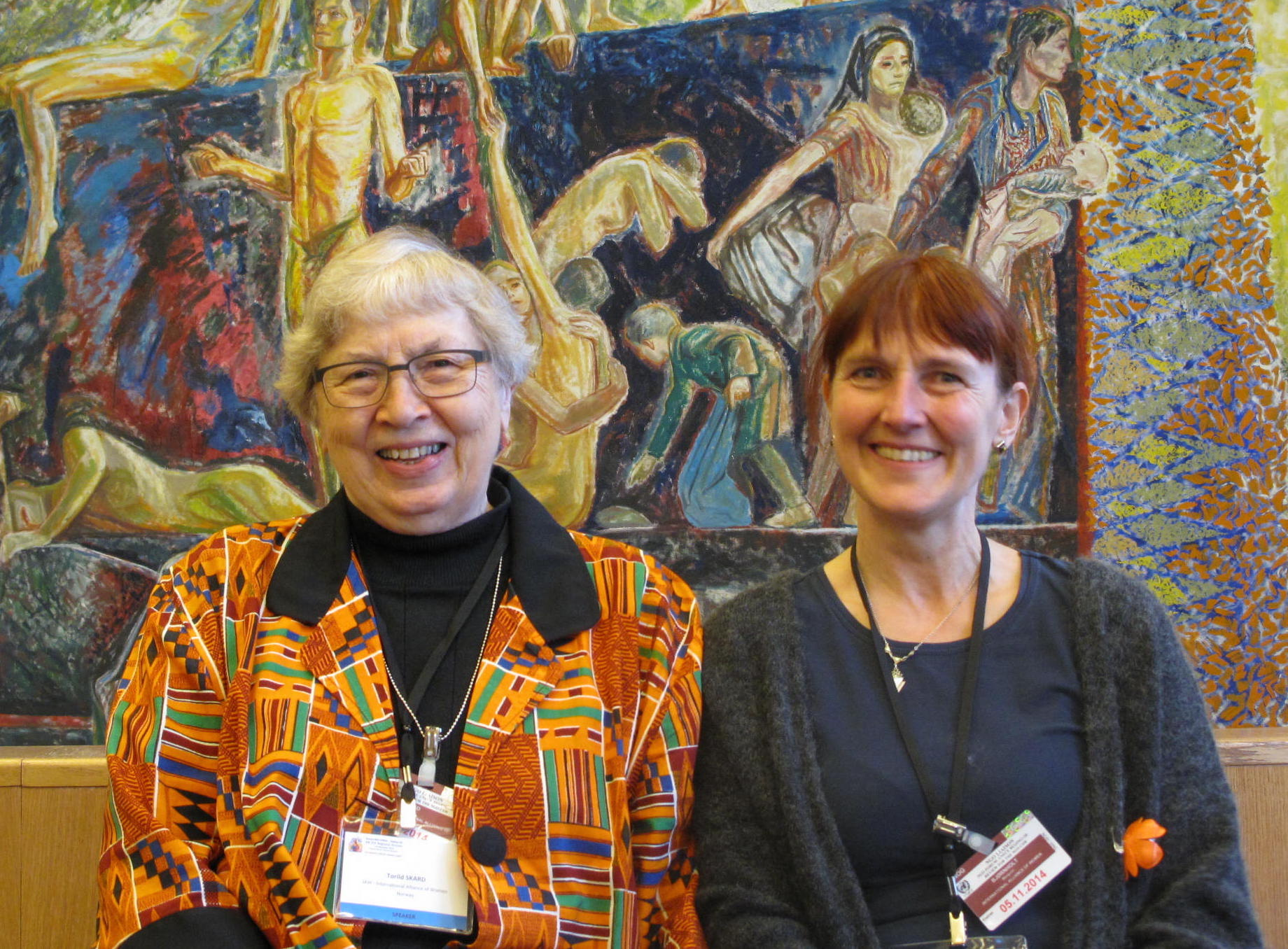
NKF Presidents Torild Skard and Margunn Bjørnholt in front of the mural The Dream of Peace, Palais des Nations, Geneva, 2014

Skard served as president of the Norwegian Association for Women's Rights (NKF) from 2006 to 2013. She has also been a deputy member of the Cultural Council in Norway (1965–1968), board member of the Student Union in Oslo (1962–1966), board member of People's Movement against the European Community (1970–1973), local leader in the Norwegian Civil Service Union (1981–1982) and deputy chair of the Forum for Women and Development (FOKUS).

In accordance with the longstanding policy of NKF Skard har opposed conscription of women.

== Honours ==
- Commander of the National Order of the Lion of Senegal, 1998
- Commander of the Order of St. Olav of Norway, 2012
- Named one of the "100 most important women" in Norwegian history by the newspaper Verdens Gang, 2013
- Honorary member of the Norwegian Association for Women's Rights, 2014

A painting of Torild Skard by Sonja Krohn (2001) is on permanent display in the Parliament of Norway Building.

== Select bibliography ==
In English

- Unfinished Democracy - Women in Nordic Politics (co-author, Pergamon, 1985), also published in Nordic edition
- Continent of Mothers, Continent of Hope: Understanding and Promoting Development in Africa Today (Zed Books, 2003), also published in Norwegian, German, French and Dutch editions
- Getting Our History Right: How Were the Equal Rights of Women and Men Included in the Charter of the United Nations? Forum for Development Studies 1/2008
- Gender in the Malestream - Acceptance of Gender Equality in Different United Nations Organisations, Forum for Development Studies 1/2009
- Women of Power: Half a Century of Female Presidents and prime ministers Worldwide (Policy Press, 2014), originally published in Norwegian by Universitetsforlaget (2012)

In Norwegian only

- Ny radikalisme i Norge (1967)
- Hva skjer med grunnskolen? (1971)
- Verksted for selvtillit (1973)
- Det er Oslo som ligger avsides (1974)
- Halve jorden - innføring i kvinnepolitikk (1977)
- «Kvinnekupp» i kommunene (ed.) (1979)
- Utvalgt til Stortinget (1980)
- Hverdag på Løvebakken (1981)
- Det koster å være kar (1984)
- Norske kommunestyrer (with O. Hellevik 1985)
