= Karen Grude Koht =

Norwegian educationalist, essayist and feminist pioneer

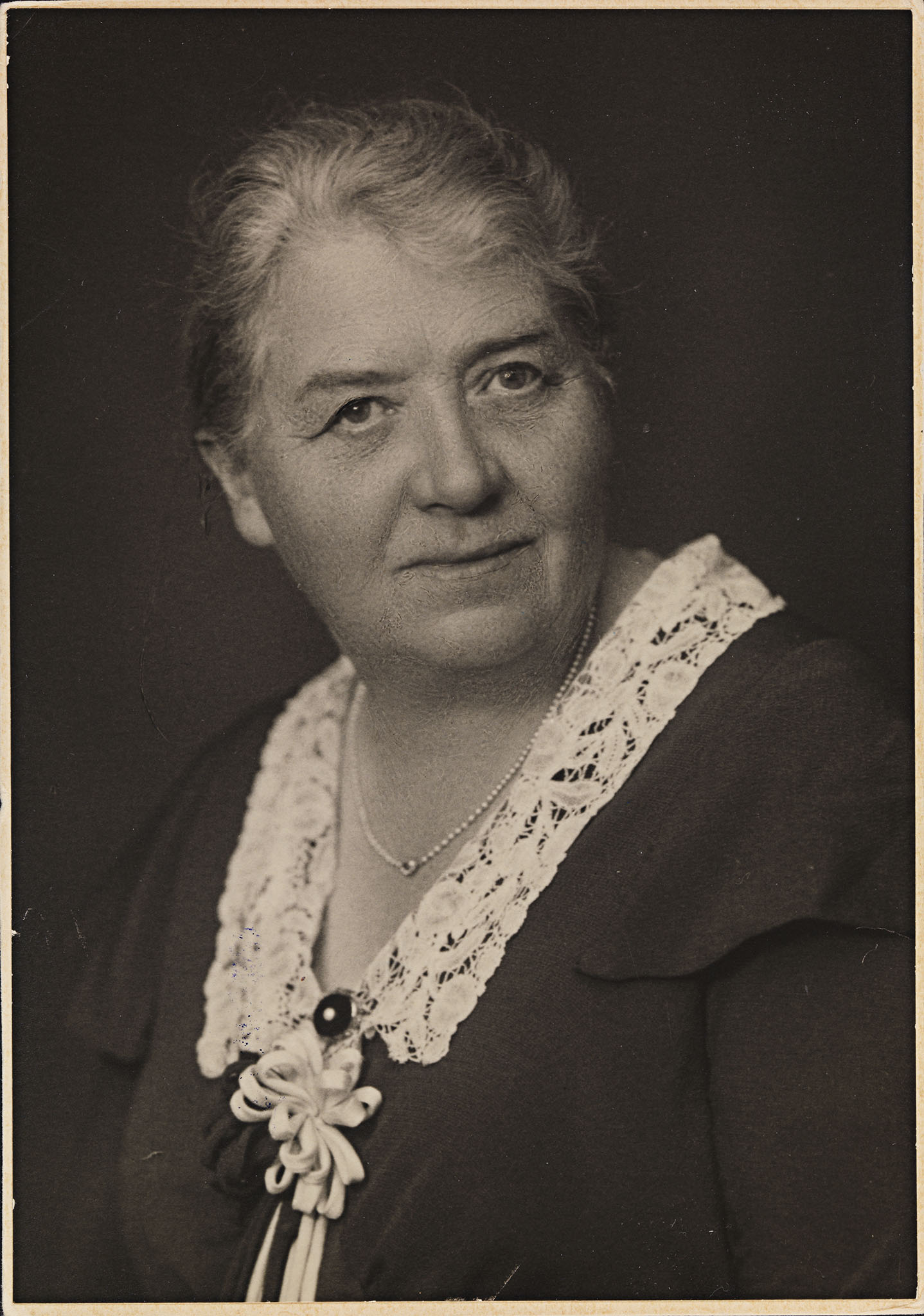
- Karen Grude Koht
- Born: Karen Grude; 16 November 1871; Høyland Municipality, Norway
- Died: 10 July 1960 (aged 88); Bærum Municipality, Norway
- Occupations: Educationalist, essayist and female pioneer
- Spouse: Halvdan Koht
- Children: 3, including: Åse Gruda Skard; Paul Koht

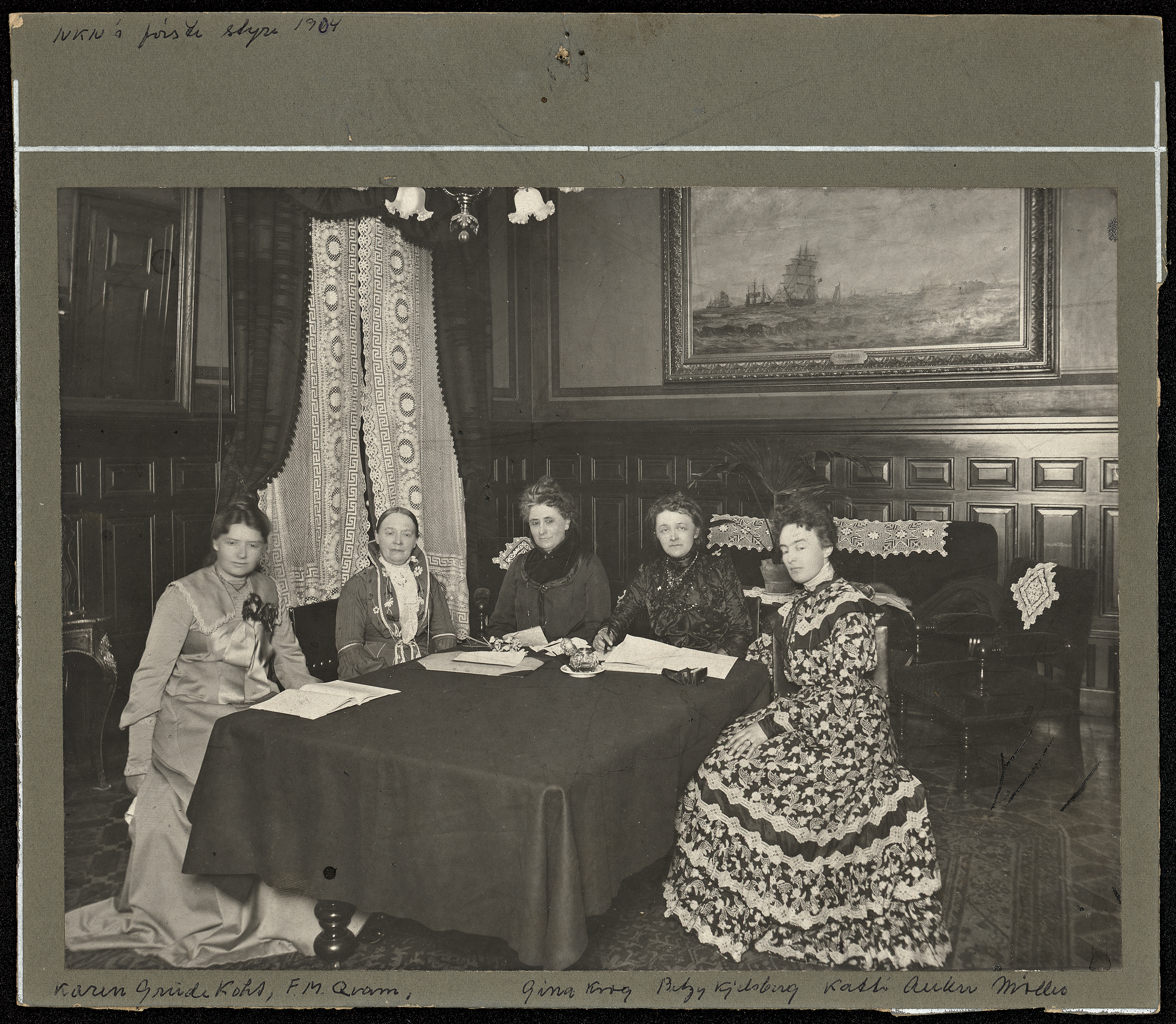
Board members of the Norwegian National Women's Council in 1904. Karen Grude Koht, Fredrikke Marie Qvam, Gina Krog, Betzy Kjelsberg and Katti Anker Møller

Karen Grude Koht (16 November 1871– 10 July 1960) was a Norwegian educationalist, essayist and feminist pioneer.

== Biography ==
She was born at Høyland Municipality in Rogaland, Norway. She was the daughter of Martin Adolf Grude (1841-1918) and Anna Karoline Mossige (1849-1910). In 1893 she traveled to Kristiania (now Oslo) to attend Ragna Nielsens skole. In 1896, she passed the teacher's test and started her working career as a teacher in Sandnes. She taught from 1911 at the State School of Education at Stabekk, from 1920 at social courses offer through the Norwegian National Women's Council and from 1923 at Den kvinnelige industriskole in Oslo. She was also a deputy member of the municipal council of Bærum Municipality and was a member of the Bærum school board 1918-24.

The Norwegian National Women's Council (Norske Kvinners Nasjonalråd) was founded in 1904 as an umbrella organization for the various Norwegian women's associations. She served as a member of the organization together with fellow rights activists Betzy Kjelsberg, Fredrikke Marie Qvam, Gina Krog and Katti Anker Møller.

She was a diligent writer in newspapers and magazines, in addition to translating books into Norwegian. Among her works are ABC. Mi fyrste bok from 1921 and Regler og rim for barn from 1923. In 1937, she completed Pedagogisk psykologi together with her daughter, Åse Gruda Skard.

== Personal life ==
In 1898, she married the noted historian Halvdan Koht. They were the parents of psychologist Åse Gruda Skard and diplomat Paul Koht. Their grandchildren include Torild Skard, Målfrid Grude Flekkøy and Halvdan Skard. She died at Bærum during 1960 and was buried at Nordre gravlund in Oslo.

== Selected works ==
- Kvinnearbeid, 1908
- Barna våre. Litt fra deres sjeleliv, 1929
- Norske kvinners nasjonalråd 25 år, 1929
- Farmor fortel for dei minste, 1960

== Related reading ==
- Agerholt, Anna Caspari (1973) Den norske kvinnebevegelses historie (Oslo: Gyldendal) ISBN 8205058776
