= Ivar Jørgensen =

Norwegian civil servant and politician

Ivar Jørgensen (31 May 1877 – 24 February 1956) was a Norwegian civil servant and politician for the Labour Party.

He was born at Langstrand in Sørøysund, son of teacher Johannes Jørgensen (1850–1892) and Beret Martha Buvik (1855–1935). He went to sea at the age of fifteen, took lower education in Kristiania and was a construction and factory laborer in Kristiania and Furnes until 1902. In 1902 he was hired in a dairy, and in 1909 he became co-owner of the dairy Fortuna Meieri. From 1916 to 1935 he was an inspector and office manager in the housing rental division of Oslo. From 1935 he was a manager of Krohgstøttens Sykehus.

He was also a city council member in Kristiania from 1907 to 1922, and deputy representative to the Parliament of Norway from Oslo during the terms 1913–1915, 1916–1918 and 1919–1921. He was a board member of Kristiania Labour Party from 1906 to 1921, and also a supervisory council member of the Labour Party until 1921. He was also active in the temperance movement.

He died in February 1956 and was buried at Nordre gravlund.
