= Norwegian Historical Association =

Promote historical research

Den norske historiske forening logo

The Norwegian Historical Association (Norwegian: Den norske historiske forening, HIFO) is a Norwegian historical organization.

The Association was founded in 1869 by Michael Birkeland and Ludvig Ludvigsen Daae. It works to promote historical research and to strengthen history in higher education and in public. Its publishes the academic journal Historisk Tidsskrift, which it commenced in 1871. The association also publishes the magazine Historikeren. Additionally the association is co-owner of Scandinavian Journal of History.

In 1990, the association merged with the organizations Norsk historikerforening (founded 1982) and Norsk komité for historisk vitskap (founded 1927). It kept its old name, but adopted the new acronym HIFO.
