= Tromsøposten =

Former Norwegian newspaper

Tromsøposten was a Norwegian newspaper, published in Tromsø. It was established in 1872, and ceased publication in 1915. The newspaper had two editors from the start, I Holthe and Paul Steenstrup Koht. Among its later editors were P. Wilh. Pedersen and Carl Moursund.
