= Halvdan Skard =

Norwegian politician (born 1939)

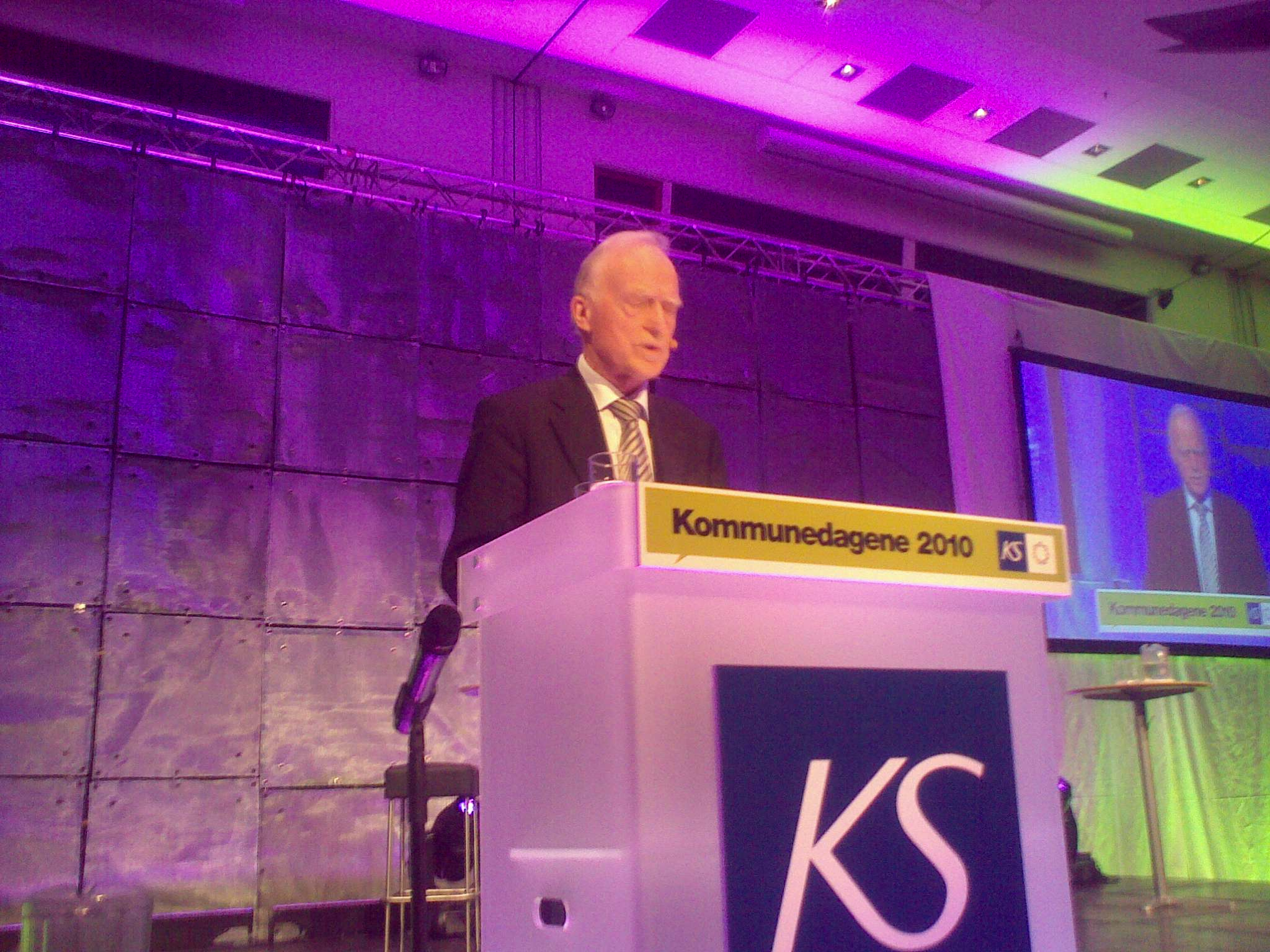
Halvdan Skard speaking for the Norwegian Association of Local and Regional Authorities.

Halvdan Skard (born 1 December 1939) is a Norwegian politician for the Labour Party.

He was born in Oslo as a son of Åse Gruda Skard and Sigmund Skard, and through Åse the grandson of Halvdan Koht and Karen Grude Koht. He has two sisters Torild Skard and Målfrid Grude Flekkøy, who are twins, and himself has a twin brother Åsmund. He grew up in Trondheim, but when World War II reached Norway in 1940 the family fled to the United States via Sweden, the Soviet Union and Japan, returning in 1945. He later finished his secondary education at Oslo Cathedral School. He studied at the University of Wisconsin, Madison from 1962 to 1963 and in Paris from 1969 to 1970. He graduated with the cand.philol. degree from the University of Oslo in 1972.

He joined the Labour Party in 1965, and became involved in local politics, first in Stavanger and later in Bærum. In Bærum he was a member of the school board from 1968 and the municipal council from 1972. After two years working for the Foundation for Student Life in Oslo, from 1972 to 1974, he was hired as an office clerk at Rogaland University College in 1974. He was a researcher there from 1976, but was largely absent, as he was appointed State Secretary in the Ministry of Church Affairs and Education, a post he held from 1976 to 1981, during the Labour government of Odvar Nordli. From 1991 to 1992 he was a deputy under-secretary of state in the Ministry of Culture.

From 1983 to 1992 he was the director of the Arts Council Norway. He became the leader of employers' organization Norwegian Association of Local and Regional Authorities in 1992. He was succeeded by Gunn Marit Helgesen in December 2013. He formally continued as director of the Arts Council, only with an absence of leave, and with acting directors working in his place, until he finally quit as director in early 2004. He also led the cultural committee of the 1994 Winter Olympics.

In 1996 he became involved in the Council of Europe, first in 1988 as a member of its Congress of Local and Regional Authorities, in 1996 a member of its Bureau, from 2002 to 2006 as president of its Chamber of Local Authorities, and from 2006 to 2008 as President of the Congress. Currently he is serving as a Vice-President in the Chamber of Local Authorities.

Cultural offices
Preceded by Åsmund Oftedal	Director of the Arts Council Norway; 1983–1992	Succeeded by Lidvin Osland (acting)
Civic offices
Preceded by Jakob Eng	Chair of the Norwegian Association of Local and Regional Authorities; 1992–2013	Succeeded by Gunn Marit Helgesen
