= Paul Steenstrup Koht =

Politician and educator

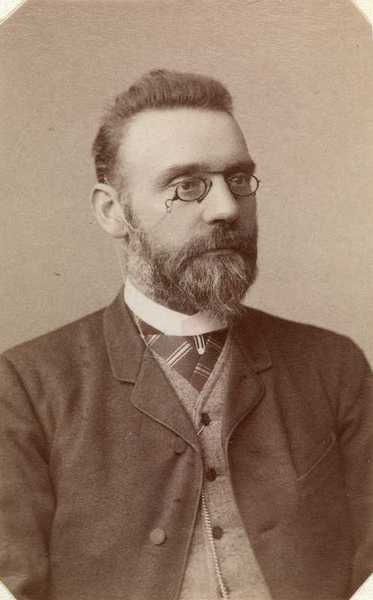

Member of Parliament for Skien
- In office 1889–1891
- In office 1892–1894

Personal details
- Born: 28 August 1844 Bodø, Norway
- Died: 26 August 1892 (aged 47) Skien, Norway
- Party: Liberal Party
- Spouse: Betty Giæver
- Children: Four, amongst them Halvdan Koht
- Profession: Educator, Politician

Paul Steenstrup Koht (28 August 1844 – 26 August 1892) was a Norwegian educator and politician for the Liberal Party. He was the father of Halvdan Koht, historian and Labour Party politician.

Having developed a penchant for Greek and Roman poetry in his student years, Koht lectured in philology as an adult. He also taught living languages, most notably Norwegian.

Despite the conservative political views of his family, Koht became fascinated by the radical national liberal movement of the late 19th century. His first political activism was manifested in his editing of Tromsøposten; in the late 1870s and early 1880s he chaired the Tromsø Labour Association, which catapulted him into the political limelight. Eventually becoming elected as both city mayor and Member of Parliament, he advocated radical reforms, amongst them common suffrage and the eight-hour day.

== Early life and educational career ==
He was born at Bodø in Nordland, Norway. He was the son of Joachim Andreas Koht, a pharmacist, and Johanne Andrea Conradi. Koht finished secondary education in 1861 and graduated with a cand. philol. degree in 1868. Koht's biographer, Bernt A. Nissen, maintained that he developed his literary taste while studying: the circle spending their leisure time in "the green chamber" of the Students' Society had, according to Nissen, a decisive influence on Koht. In a bulletin titled Samfundsblade, Koht—together with Sofus Arctander, Ole Furu and Hans Brecke—recited Ancient Greek and Latin poems.

In the year following his graduation, Koht started his tuition at Norwegian schools. Inspired by the classical languages of his formative years, he taught Ancient Greek and Classical Latin in addition to Standard Norwegian—he taught those languages for the remainder of his tutorial career. He began at Gjersten School, before moving to Tromsø, where he taught at the school of his childhood. He was appointed preceptor of that school in 1871.

In 1885, Koht moved with his family to Skien, where he would live for the rest of his life. Having been instantaneously appointed head teacher of Skien Upper Secondary School, he travelled to Germany and Switzerland in the subsequent year—he had received a travel grant from the government to study the educational systems of German-speaking Europe. On his return to Skien, Koht continued his tuition at the secondary school; amongst his students was his son Halvdan Koht, who, two years before the elder Koht's decease in 1892, took his examen artium there, continuing with philological studies in Kristiania.

== Political career ==
Coming from a disciplined family of a conservative culture, Koht fell under the spell of the neoteric national liberal ideology, developing a weltanschauung radical for his time. He was the founding editor of Tromsøposten, which was established in 1872. After only one year, Koht left the paper, disenchanted with its publishing of an article that he felt violated the principles of the newspaper. He entered the board of a local labour association in 1874, and, three years later, was elected into the city council. In 1883 he was voted Mayor of Tromsø; he acted in that position for two years, concurrently with his tuition at the city's secondary school.

Upon his move to Skien he further pursued his career within politics, being elected mayor of the city in 1886. The latest city fire posed a heavy burden onto the newly elected mayor; yet, according to Nissen, Koht administered the task "in an outstanding way". In 1889 and 1892, he was elected Liberal MP to the Norwegian Parliament from the constituency of Skien. In the parliament, Koht vigorously advocated the universal suffrage, having threatened to abjure the local Liberal Party league from the central party lest the common suffrage be excluded from the party programme. As a member of the Standing Committee on Business and Industry, he dealt with other liberal reforms of the time, amongst them the working time reform, the Factory Supervision Act of 1892 (Norwegian: Fabrikktilsynsloven) and an intergovernmental arbitration reform—Koht's positions on these issues were considerably more radical than those of the other committeepeople.

== Personal life ==
In 1871 he married Betty Giæver (1845–1936), a merchant's daughter whose great-grandfather was the civil servant Jens Holmboe. They were the parents of four children, the most famous of whom was historian Halvdan Koht. He was the grandfather of Åse Gruda Skard (1905–85) and Paul Koht (1913–2002).
