= Historisk Tidsskrift (Norway) =

Norwegian journal

Historisk Tidsskrift is a Norwegian history journal. It was established in 1870 by Ludvig Ludvigsen Daae and Michael Birkeland. It is published quarterly by the Norwegian Historical Association, and until 1955 the editor-in-chief was also the chairman of that organization.
