= Betzy Kjelsberg =

Norwegian feminist and politician (1866–1950)

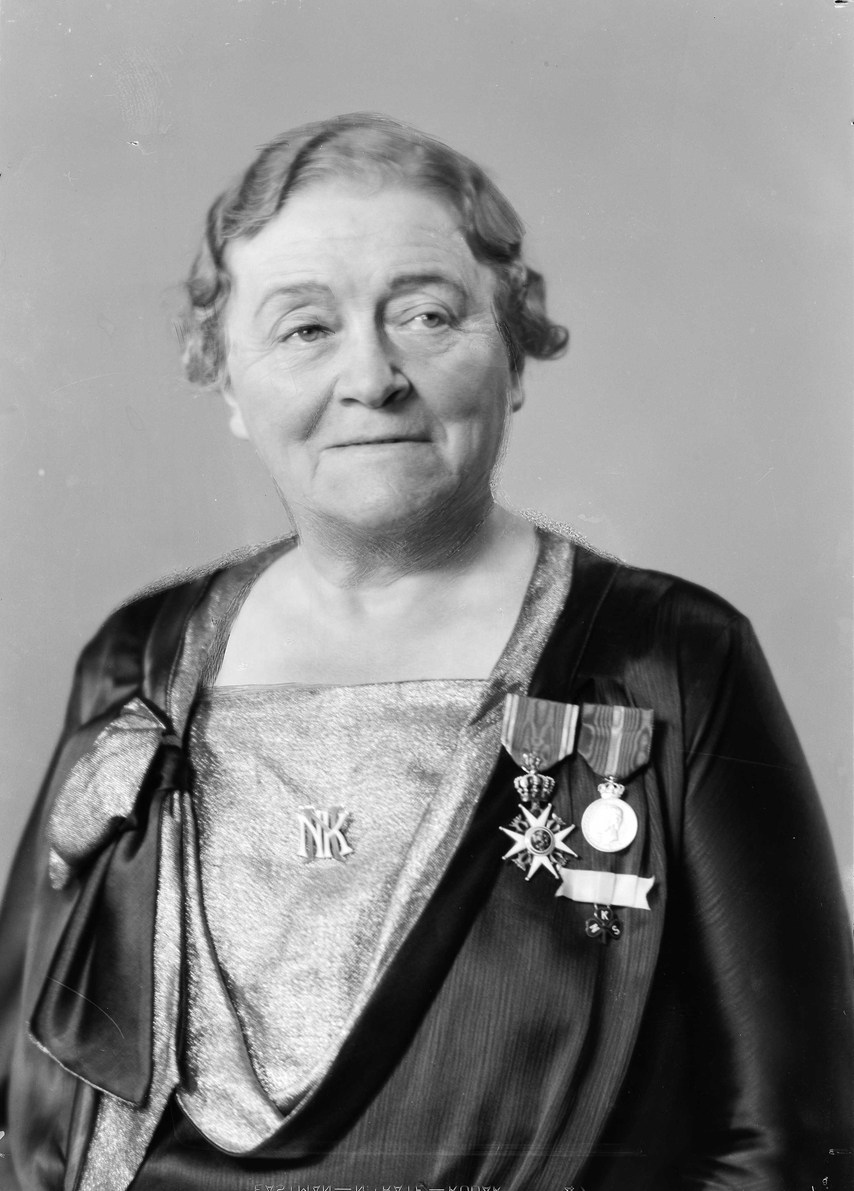
Betzy Kjelsberg

Betzy Aleksandra Kjelsberg (née Børresen) (1 November 1866 – 3 October 1950) was a Norwegian women's rights activist, suffragist and a member of the feminist movement. She was a politician with the Liberal Party and the first female board member of the party.

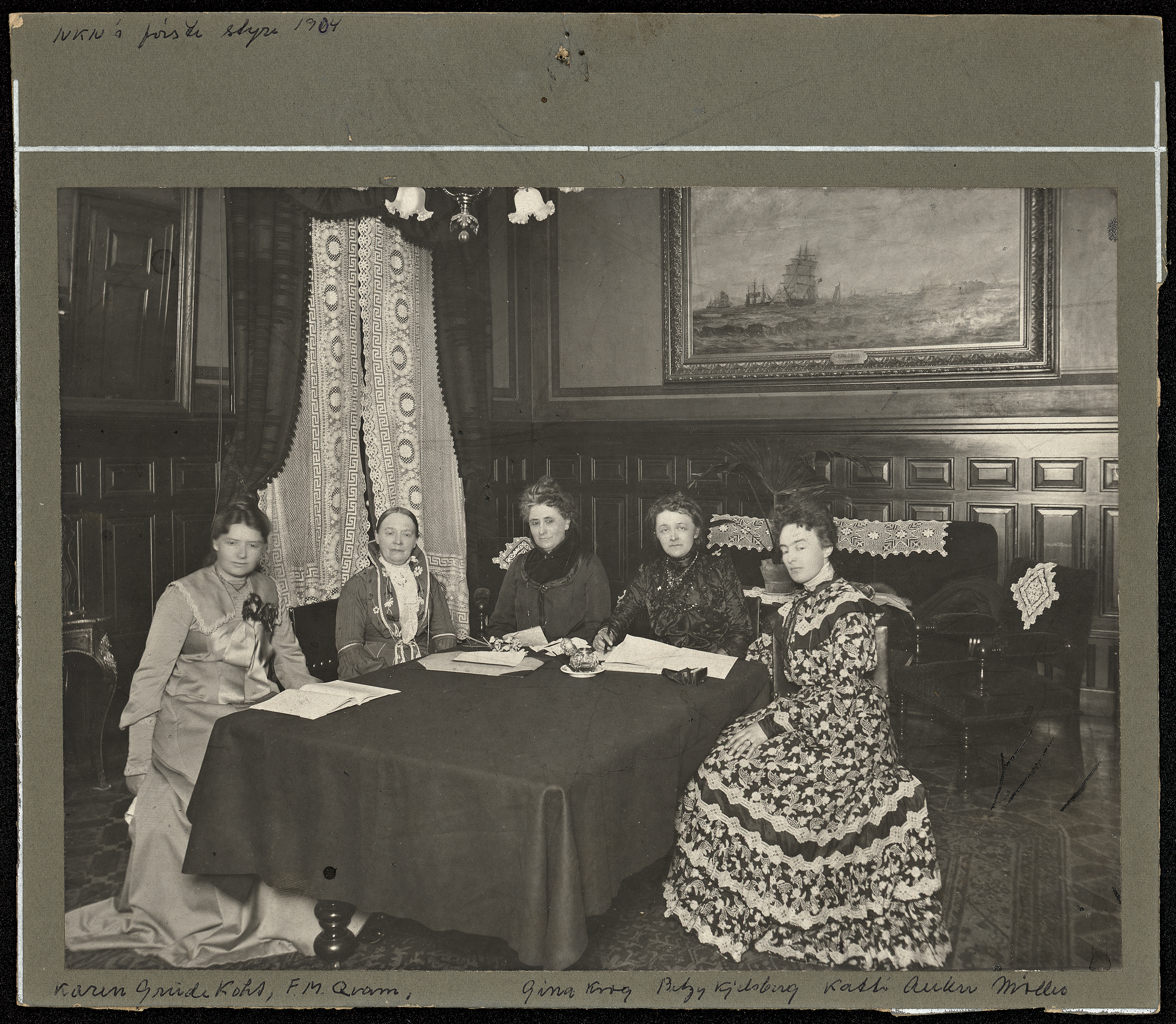
Board members of the Norwegian National Women's Council in 1904. Karen Grude Koht, Fredrikke Marie Qvam, Gina Krog, Betzy Kjelsberg and Katti Anker Møller

== Biography ==
Betzy Aleksandra Børresen was born at Svelvik in Vestfold, Norway. She was the daughter of Thor Børresen (1816–72) and Jessie McGlashan (1842–1915). Her father was Norwegian, while her mother was from Scotland. After her father died, the family moved to Drammen, where Betzy's mother married merchant Anton Enger. However, he had to close his shop, forcing them to move to Christiania (now Oslo). While living there, she started her examen artium, as one of the first women in Norway to do so, but she never actually finished it due to the poor economy of her stepfather.

In 1883, she co-founded the discussion group Skuld together with Cecilie Thoresen Krog. Kjelsberg created the associations Women's Trade Organization (Kvinnelig Handelsstands forening) in 1894, Drammen Women's Association (Drammen Kvinnesaksforening) in 1896, with its own housewife school, Drammen Public Health (1899) and Drammen Women's Council (1903). She was a co-founder of the Norwegian Association for Women's Rights (1884) and the National Association for Women's Suffrage (1885), which worked for giving women the right to vote. Kjelsberg was an opponent of protective laws, such as the Night Work Convention, which restricted the rights of women workers. At the International Labor Conference in Washington, D.C. in 1919 she stated, "I am against special protective laws for women, except pregnant women and women nursing children one year of age because I believe that we are furthering the cause of good labor laws most by working toward the prohibition of all absolutely unnecessary night work. It is hard to see old worn out men and young boys in the most critical period of development work during the night."

The Norwegian National Women's Council (Norske Kvinners Nasjonalråd) was founded in 1904 as an umbrella organization for the various Norwegian women's associations. She served as a member of the organization together with fellow rights activists Karen Grude Koht, Fredrikke Marie Qvam, Gina Krog and Katti Anker Møller. From 1916 she served as Presidents of the Women's Council.

In 1905, Kjelsberg was elected to the city council of Drammen, where she sat for two terms. In 1910 she became Norway's first female factory inspector - a position she had until 1936. From 1921 to 1934, Kjelsberg was the Norwegian government's representative at the meetings of the International Labour Organization in Geneva. From 1926 to 1938, she was the vice-president of the International Council of Women.

== Honors ==
- In 1916, she was awarded the King's Medal of Merit (Kongens fortjenstmedalje) in gold.
- In 1935, she was appointed Knight 1st Class in the Order of St. Olav.

== Personal life ==
In 1885, she was married to jurist Oluf Fredrik Kjelsberg (1861–1923), with whom she had six children. They were the great-grandparents of Siv Jensen, leader of the Norwegian Progress Party.

== Legacy ==
Betzy Kjelsberg died during 1950 in Bergen. She was buried at Vår Frelsers gravlund in Oslo. Betzy Kjelsbergs vei in Oslo, Betzy Kjelsbergs vei in Drammen and Betzy Kjelsbergs gate in Stavanger are all street in Norway named in her honor. There is a statue of her on Marcus Thranes gate (ring 2) in Oslo.

== Other sources ==
- Skaarer, Åse Camilla. "Betzy Kjelsberg (1866-1950)". (Stemmerett.no).
- Reistad, Gunhild Ramm (1994) Betzy Kjelsberg og Drammen (Brakar AS lokalhistorisk forlag) ISBN 9788291263021
- Folkvord, Magnhild (2016) Betzy Kjelsberg – Feminist og brubyggjar (Oslo: Samlaget) ISBN 9788252188042

== Bibliography ==
- Kjelsberg, Betzy Alexandra; Gunnar Jahn; Tove Mohr; Sigrid Stray (1935). Kvinnens sosiale stilling. (J.M. Stenersens forlag).
