= Målfrid Grude Flekkøy =

Norwegian chief psychologist and civil servant

- Born: Målfrid Grude Skard; 29 November 1936; Oslo, Norway
- Died: 2 November 2013 (aged 76)
- Occupation: Psychologist
- Known for: First Children's Commissioner in Norway
- Spouses: Kjell Magne Flekkøy (m. 1962; div. 1981) Truls Wilhelm Gedde-Dahl (m. 1983; div. 1995)
- Children: 3 from her first marriage
- Parent(s): Sigmund Skard; Åse Gruda Skard
- Relatives: Halvdan Skard (brother); Torild Skard (twin sister); Halvdan Koht (grandfather); Karen Grude Koht (grandmother); Matias Skard (grandfather); Paul Koht (uncle); Tobias Gedde-Dahl (father-in-law)

Målfrid Grude Flekkøy (née Skard) (29 November 1936 – 2 November 2013) was a Norwegian chief psychologist and civil servant. Having worked for several years in different health and educational institutions for children, she was appointed as Children's Commissioner in Norway from 1981 to 1989. She was the first person in the world to hold such a position. She established and developed the role, and after eight years (two terms) the UN Organization for Children UNICEF engaged her to assist in spreading the institution to other countries. Flekkøy travelled extensively, participated in professional organizations and wrote books and articles on children's rights. At her death in 2013, more than 80 children's commissioners had been set up around the world.

== Personal life ==
Målfrid Grude Skard was born in Oslo, the daughter of professor Sigmund Skard (1903–1995) and one of the best-known child psychologists in Norway, Åse Gruda Skard (1905–1985). She was a sister of Anne, Åsmund and Halvdan Skard and twin sister of Torild Skard. Through her mother, she was the granddaughter of historian and minister of foreign affairs Halvdan Koht and women's activist Karen Grude Koht, and through her father she was the granddaughter of superintendent of schools Matias Skard and teacher Gyda Benedikte (born Christensen) and niece of Torfinn, Bjarne, Eiliv, Olav, Vemund and Gunhild Skard and Målfrid Birkeland. She was also the niece of Paul Koht.

From 1962 to 1981, she was married to psychologist Kjell Magne Flekkøy (born 1939) and had three children: Eirik, Kjetil and Ingunn. She was married for a second time, from 1983 to 1995, to Truls Wilhelm Gedde-Dahl (born 1930).

== Career ==
Målfrid Grude Flekkøy grew up in Norway and the US. When German troops attacked Norway in 1940, the family fled to the US. In 1945 they moved back to Norway and Målfrid finished secondary school at Stabekk near Oslo in 1956. She then studied in Århus, Denmark, to become a preschool teacher. She received her cand.psychol. degree from the University of Oslo in 1967 and became a specialist in clinical psychology in 1973. In 1991 she received her doctorate from the University of Ghent, Belgium.

From 1959 to 1960, she was a kindergarten teacher in Oslo. Then she worked as a psychologist at the Emma Hjorth Home for mentally handicapped children in 1968–1969 and at the Nic Waal child psychiatric institute in the Oslo area from 1969 to 1972. She went to the Pennsylvania Psychiatric Hospital in the US in 1972–1973. From 1973 to 1976, she was employed at the child psychiatric ward at Ullevål Hospital in Oslo. From 1976 to 1979, she was a chief psychologist at the health care center for mentally handicapped people in Akershus, near Oslo, and, from 1979 to 1981, educational and psychological counsellor for pre-school children in the municipality of Bærum, near Oslo. From 1991, she worked as a chief psychologist at the Nic Waal Institute until she retired in 2005, only interrupted in 1997 by a trip to the US, where she was a visiting fellow at the Institute for Families in Society at the University of South Carolina. There she wrote the book The Participation Rights of the Child together with Natalie H. Kaufman.

She was an active leader in the YWCA scouts and a member of the board of SOS Children's Villages in Norway. She was engaged in local politics from 1971 to 1983 and 2007 to 2013, mostly in Bærum, near Oslo, representing the Labour Party.

== Children's Commissioner ==
From 1981 to 1989, Flekkøy was the Children's Commissioner in Norway; the first commissioner of its kind in the world. She developed a new role based on hard work and professional thoroughness and rooted it both in politics and the children. She contributed to the expansion of research on children in Norway and pioneered the efforts to obtain a total ban on corporal punishment, which was adopted in 1987. Many countries followed the example of the Nordic countries in this area. Afterwards she became a senior fellow at UNICEF's International Child Development Center in Florence, Italy, to promote the concept of children's commissioner worldwide. She traveled internationally and assisted among others Costa Rica in establishing the commissioner institution. In addition she wrote books and articles, including Working for the Rights of Children (UNICEF, Florence, 1990) and her doctor's thesis, "A Voice for Children" (UNICEF, London, Kingsley, 1991), which she dedicated to her mother. At her death in 2013 the Norwegian government thanked Flekkøy for her efforts for children and youth both in Norway and abroad; the Norwegian Commissioner for Equality, Sunniva Ørstavik, proposed that a parade street in Oslo should be named after Flekkøy, and UNICEF noted that Flekkøy had been an example and an advocate for children's rights worldwide.

From 1964 to 1971, Flekkøy was secretary and acting secretary general for the World Organization for Early Childhood Education and Care (OMEP). From 1986 to 1989, she was secretary general for the International Association for Child and Adolescent Psychiatry and Allied Professions (IACAPAP). In 1992 she became Vice President Europe of Defence for Children International and collaborator in The International Journal of Children's Rights and, in 1998, president of the Children's Rights Publications Foundation in the Netherlands. In 2006 she was designated an honorary member of OMEP for her efforts.

Civic offices
Preceded by Position created	Children's Commissioner in Norway; 1981–1989	Succeeded by Trond Viggo Torgersen
