= Bjørg Krane Bostad =

Feminist, civic leader, civil servant, businesswoman and humanitarian

25th President of the Norwegian Association for Women's Rights
- In office 1992–1994
- Preceded by: Siri Hangeland
- Succeeded by: Kjellaug Pettersen

Personal details
- Born: 1948 (age 77–78)

Bjørg Krane Bostad (born 1948) is a Norwegian feminist, civic leader, civil servant, businesswoman and humanitarian.

She served as president of the Norwegian Association for Women's Rights from 1992 to 1994. From 1990 to 1995 she served as a member of the Committee for Human Rights, a governmental committee appointed by the Ministry of Foreign Affairs. She was also a board member of Amnesty International in Norway from 1986 to 1990. From 1980 she worked as a civil servant at the Norwegian Consumer Ombudsman where she was responsible for discriminatory advertisement. She later became the parliamentary secretary of the Standing Committee on Family and Cultural Affairs in the Parliament of Norway. Bostad moved to South Africa in 2000, where she owns a company specializing in safari tours in Namibia, Botswana, Zambia, Zimbabwe, Mozambique, Tanzania, Kenya and South Africa. She is also involved in humanitarian work in Africa, and serves as a director of the Qokiso Orphans Project.

Bostad studied political science at the University of Oslo, and graduated with a cand.mag. degree.
