= Kåre Øistein Hansen =

Norwegian politician

Kåre Øistein Hansen (8 November 1927 – 6 May 2012) was a Norwegian politician for the Socialist Left Party. He served as a member of the Parliament of Norway during the term 1973–1977, representing Buskerud, and was a member of the Standing Committee on Finance and Economic Affairs.

== Background and career ==
Kåre Øistein Hansen was born in Drammen, Buskerud, in Norway. He was the son of municipal social welfare officer Harald Bernhard Hansen (1894-1970) and textile worker and housewife Gudrun, born Hansen (1893-1989). Kåre Øistein went to primary and secondary school in Drammen, but his education was interrupted in 1942. His father became a member of NS, Nasjonal Samling (National Unification, a political party collaborating with the German occupants) during the second world war and enrolled his son in the NS Youth Association. Kåre Øistein was sent as an apprentice to one of the vocational schools of the NS Youth Association in Oslo and joined the German Ski Hunter Battalion in 1944. After the war he was arrested and sentenced to imprisonment for treason and complicity in murder. He was 17 years old when the murder took place (Drammen City Court, 24 Nov 1947). After serving his prison term Kåre Øistein Hansen got a job as a repairman in 1948, obtained a certificate of completed apprenticeship as a mechanic and worked as a mechanic, fitter and turner in two factories in Drammen from 1949 to 1978. After he left parliament, Hansen became labor inspector in Oslo 1978-83 and safety deputy in the welfare services for the elderly in Oslo 1983–90, when he retired.

Hansen took courses for union officials, commercial school and the school of the Norwegian Federation of Trade Unions. For 12 years he was leader of the local trade union and became member of the executive committees of the regional and national Iron and Metal Workers' Union.

== Member of Parliament ==
In 1971 Kåre Øistein Hansen was elected to the local council in Drammen and the county council in Buskerud for the Labor party. But he was against Norwegian membership in the Common Market and became chair of the Democratic Socialists AIK, Buskerud, a dissenter group from the Labor Party, that joined SV, Sosialistisk Valgforbund (Socialist Alliance, later the Socialist Left Party) before the elections in 1973. Hansen was elected to parliament 1973-77 and was member of the SV national party board 1975–77. Some quarters criticized Hansen and SV, when Hansen was elected to parliament, because of his sentence for treason. But Hansen received broad support. He had settled his account, and people who worked with him, described him as an honest and exceptionally thoughtful person. So he served his whole term.

== Personal life ==
Kåre Hansen was an active sportsman and had a number of tasks in the local and national football organizations.

In 1949 Hansen married Laila Johanne, born Kaldestad (1928-2012) and they had three children. He was divorced in 1977 and later married Torild Skard (1936- ) who also was a member of parliament.

== Literature ==
- Olaf Chr. Torp (1978): Stortinget Høsten 1973-Våren 1977 (Parliament Autumn 1973-Spring 1977, in Norwegian), Oslo: Universitetsforlaget ISBN 82-00-05190-0
