= Åse Gruda Skard =

Norwegian psychologist

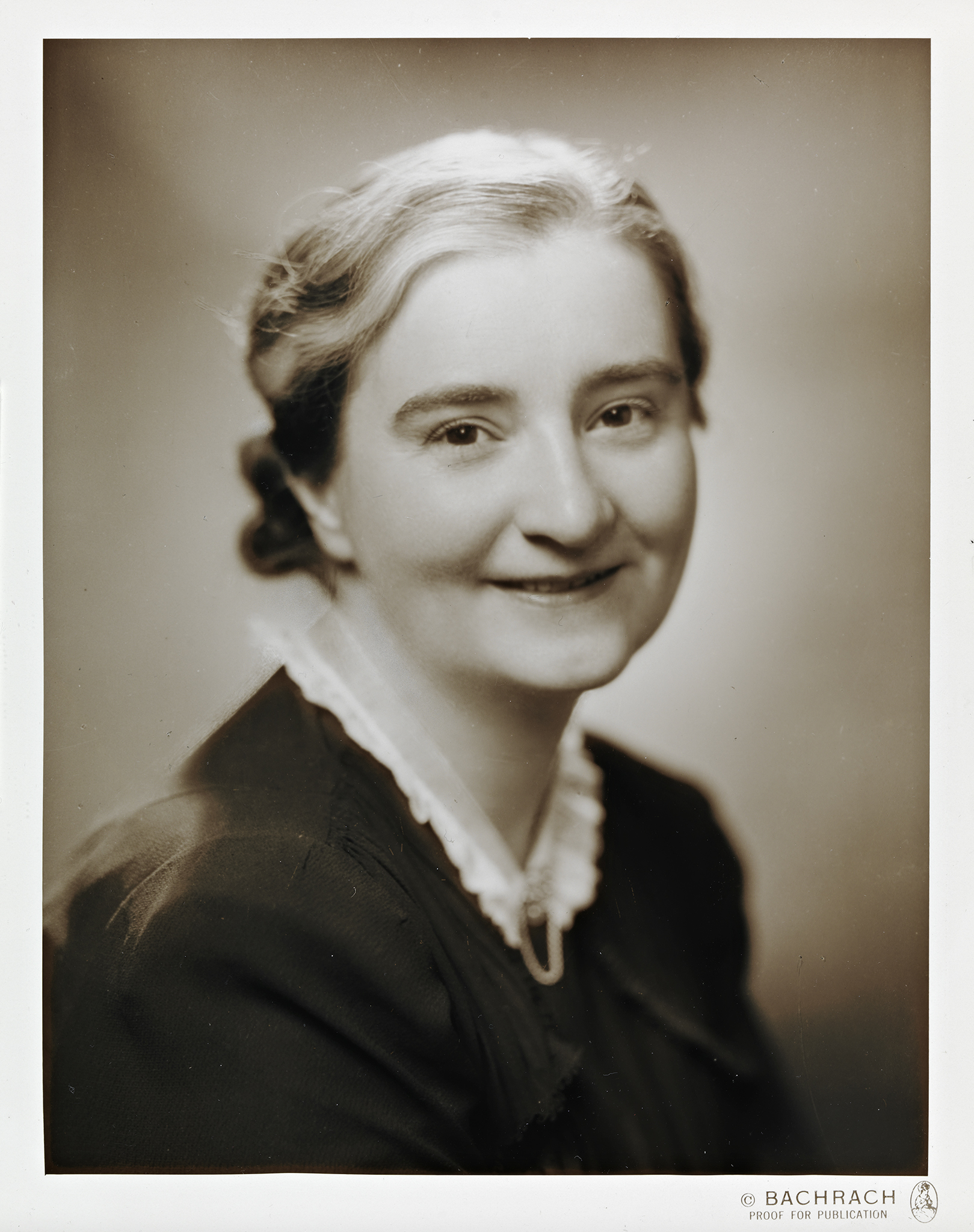
- Åse Gruda Skard (1941)
- Born: Åse Gruda Koht; 2 December 1905; Kristiania, Norway
- Died: 13 August 1985 (aged 79); Bærum, Norway
- Education: University of Oslo
- Occupation: Psychologist
- Spouse: Sigmund Skard
- Children: 5, including: Målfrid Grude Flekkøy; Torild Skard; Halvdan Skard
- Parent(s): Halvdan Koht; Karen Grude Koht
- Relatives: Paul Koht (brother)
- Awards: Melsom Prize (1936)

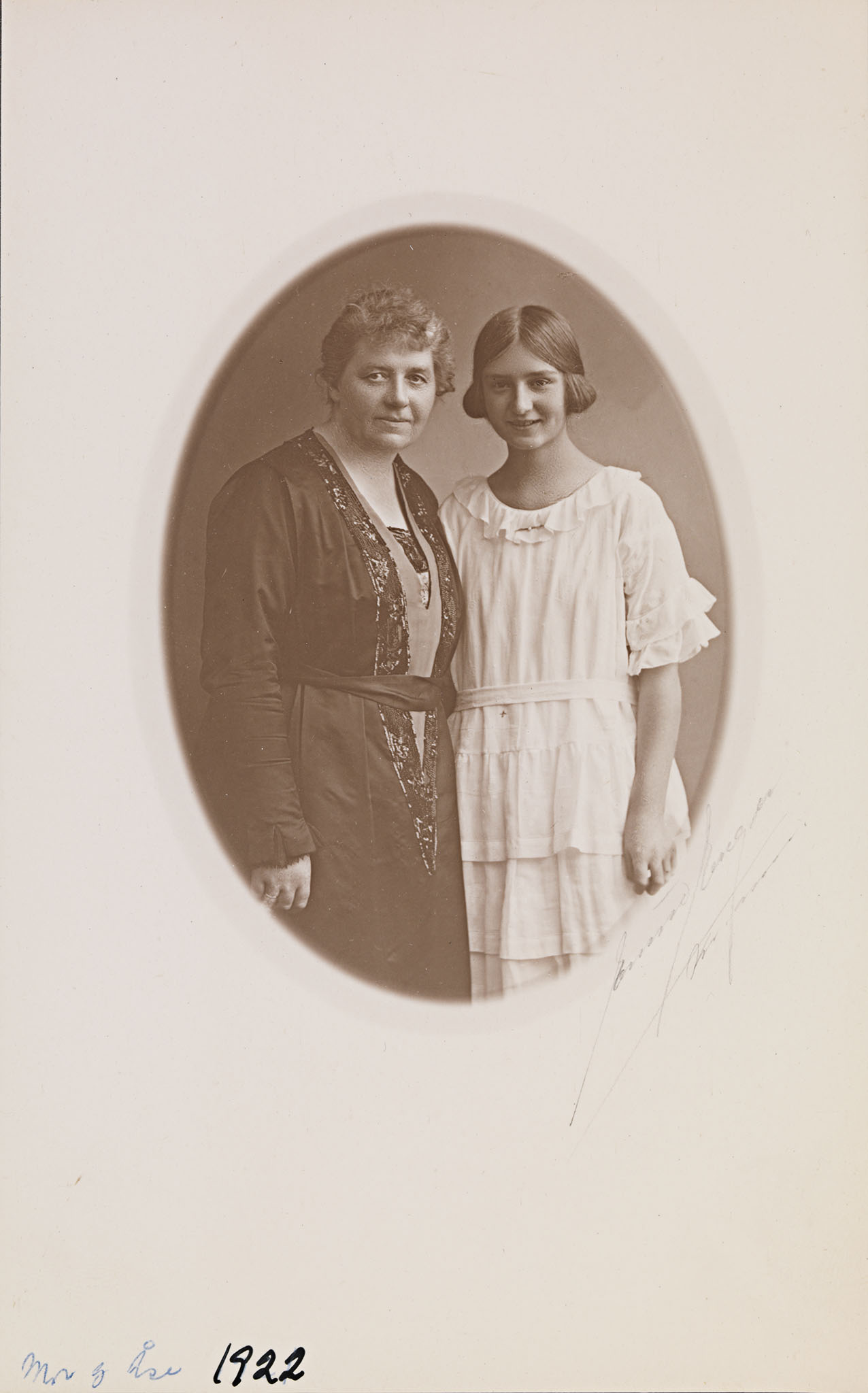
Åse Gruda Skard in 1922 (right), with her mother Karen Grude Koht

Åse Gruda Skard (née Koht) (2 December 1905 – 13 August 1985) was a Norwegian university professor, child psychologist and author. She was a noted pioneer in the field of childhood development and psychology.

== Biography ==
She was born at Kristiania (now Oslo), Norway. She was the daughter of Halvdan Koht (1873–1965) and Karen Elisabeth Grude (1871–1960). Her father was a noted historian and professor at the University of Oslo. Her mother was an educator, author and feminist pioneer. Her brother Paul Koht (1913–2002) was a diplomat and ambassador.

In 1931, she obtained a Master's degree in Psychology from the University of Oslo. After a year of study in the United States, she got a job as a scientific assistant in the Department of Psychology at the University of Oslo in 1933.

During the Occupation of Norway by Nazi Germany (1940-1945), she re-located to the United States. During this period, she lectured at Wilson College in Chambersburg, Pennsylvania. After the liberation of Norway, she lectured in psychology with emphasis on child psychology at the University of Oslo from 1947 to 1973.

In 1934, she established the Norwegian Psychology Association (Norsk psykologforening) and served as chairman 1945–1949. She edited the journal Norsk pedagogisk tidsskrift from 1936 to 1970. She wrote 24 books and almost 2,000 journal articles.

== Personal life ==
She was married to Sigmund Skard (1903–95). Her husband was a professor of literature at the University of Oslo. She was the mother of five children including twin daughters, Målfrid Grude Flekkøy (1936–2013) and Torild Skard (born 1936), both of whom were trained psychologists who were associated with UNICEF. Her son Halvdan Skard (born 1939) served as chairman of the Arts Council Norway.

In 1980, she was appointed a Knight first class in the Order of St. Olav and received an honorary Doctorate Degree from the University of Bergen. She died during 1985 and was buried beside her husband at Haslum kirkegård in Bærum.

== Selected works ==
- Pedagogisk psykologi (1937, jointly with Karen Grude Koht)
- Barn i vardagslivet (1940)
- Ungene våre (1948)
- Vanlige vansker med vanlige barn (1965)
- Praktisk barnepsykologi (1972)
- Liv laga. Ei minnebok 1905–1940 (1985)
