= Michael Birkeland =

Norwegian jurist and historian (1830–1896)

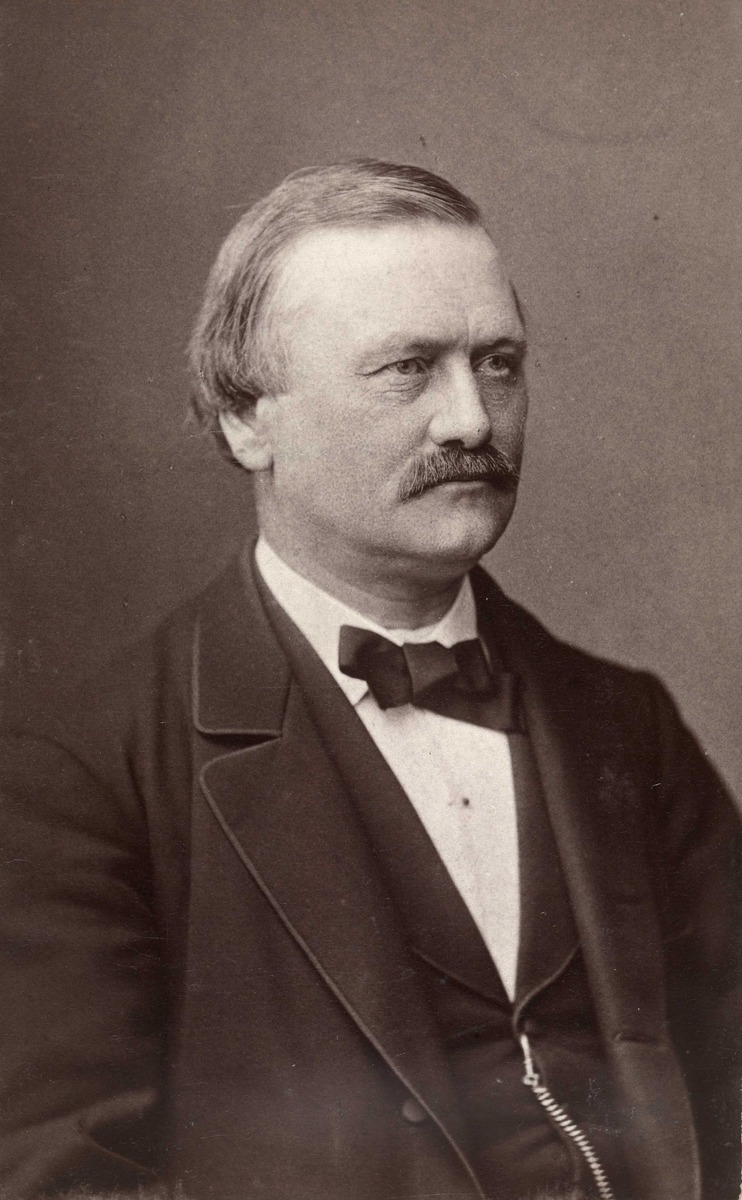
- Born: 16 December 1830; Egersund, Norway
- Died: 24 May 1896 (aged 65)
- Occupations: Historian; Civil servant (Riksarkivar); Politician
- Known for: Co-founded the Norwegian Historical Association (1869); Edited Historisk Tidsskrift (1869–1879); Member of the Storting
- Awards: Order of St. Olav

Michael Birkeland (16 December 1830 – 24 May 1896) was a Norwegian historian, civil servant and politician.

He was born in Egersund in Rogaland, Norway. In 1855, he was awarded his cand. jur. at the University of Christiania (now University of Oslo). In 1852, he became an assistant in the National Archives of Norway (Riksarkivet). In 1863, he took over the position of national archivist.

He co-founded the Norwegian Historical Association in 1869, and edited the academic journal Historisk Tidsskrift from 1869 to 1879. He was a member of the Storting from 1880 to 1885. He was decorated Knight of the Order of St. Olav in 1875.
