= Berit Kvæven =

Norwegian chemist and politician

Berit Kvæven PhD
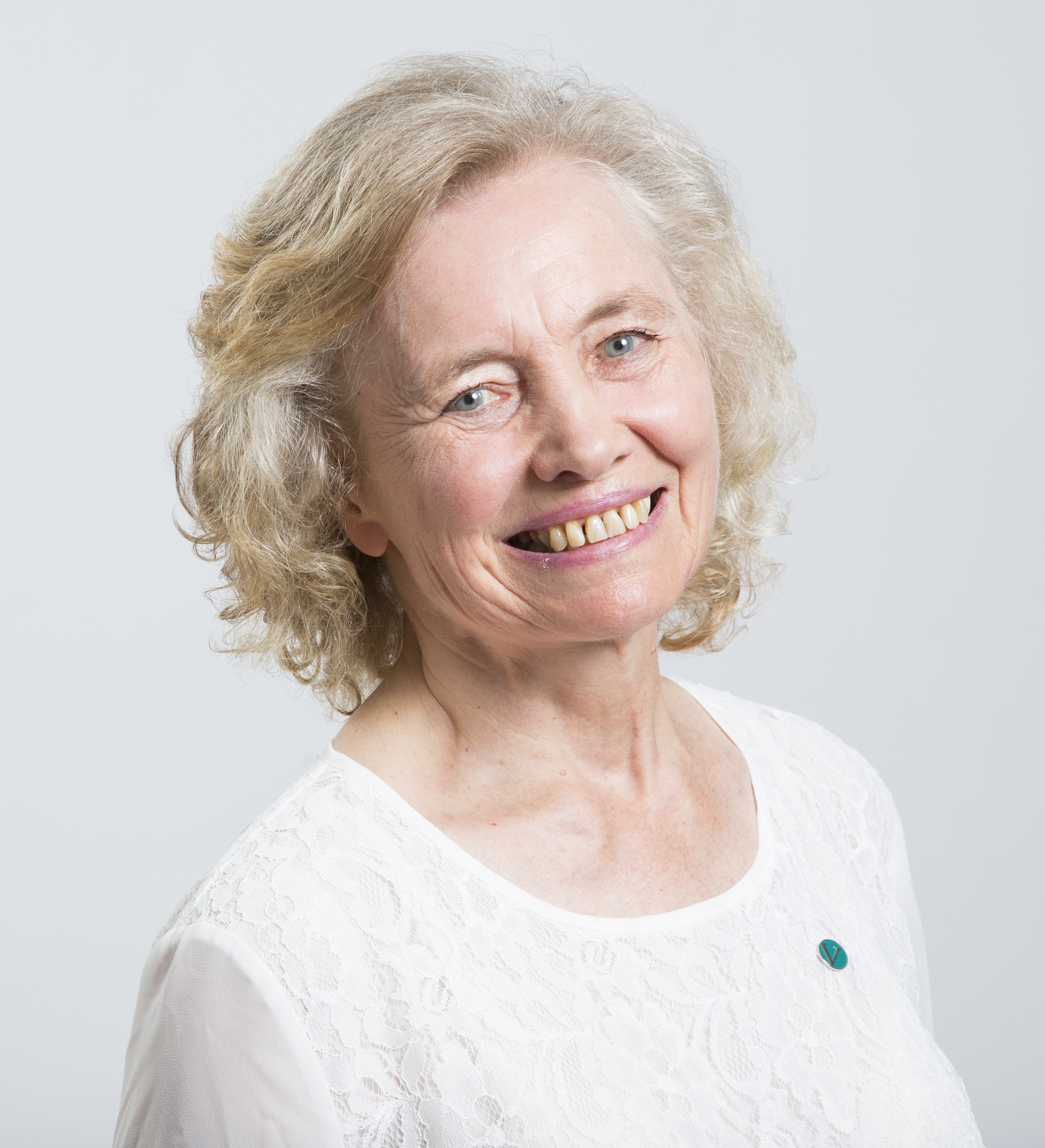

Vice-President of the Liberal Party
- In office 1976–1982

President of Tekna
- In office 1990–1993

Deputy member of the Parliament of Norway
- In office 1997–2001

28th President of the Norwegian Association for Women's Rights
- In office 2004–2006
- Preceded by: Siri Hangeland
- Succeeded by: Torild Skard

Personal details
- Born: 19 November 1942 (age 83)
- Party: Liberal Party
- Profession: chemist

Berit Kvæven (born 19 November 1942) is a Norwegian chemist and politician for the Liberal Party. She has been Vice President of the Liberal Party, president of the Norwegian Association for Women's Rights (2004–2006), President of Tekna and a deputy member of parliament.

== Career ==
Kvæven earned a civil engineer (MSc) degree at the Norwegian Institute of Technology in 1967 and was a research scientist at SINTEF from 1968. She earned a doctorate in chemistry from the Norwegian Institute of Technology in 1975. In later years, she has worked as Chief Engineer at the Norwegian Climate and Pollution Agency, where she worked on international assignments, including as head of the UN monitoring program for acid rain.

She served as personal secretary (i.e. political adviser) to the Minister of Government Administration and Consumer Affairs Eva Kolstad in Korvald's Cabinet 1972–1973 and as deputy representative to the Norwegian Parliament from Oslo during the term 1997–2001.

She was Vice President of the Liberal Party from 1976 to 1982, President of the Oslo branch of the Liberal Party in 1990 and president of the Norwegian Association for Women's Rights from 2004 to 2006. She was President of Tekna, the Norwegian association of engineers with around 50,000 members, from 1990 to 1993. She was also Vice President of the Confederation of Academic and Professional Unions in Norway, with around 200,000 members, from 1991 to 1993.

She has also been a member of several governmental committees and boards of directors in the fields of nuclear energy, pollution, agriculture and government reform.
