= Arne Lie (politician) =

Norwegian civil servant and politician (1927–1996)

Arne Gunnar Stein Lie (16 January 1927 – 25 September 1996) was a Norwegian civil servant and politician for the Labour Party.

He was born in Oslo. He finished his secondary education in 1945 and took Oslo Commerce School in 1946. After working in Det Norske Luftfartselskap from 1946 to 1947 and as a secretary in the Ministry of Trade, he graduated with the cand.oecon. degree from the University of Oslo in 1951.

He served as secretary at the Norwegian embassy to the OEEC (OECD) from 1956. From 1959 to 1960 he was an assistant secretary in the Ministry of Trade. He then served as office manager in the Bank of Norway from 1960, head of department in OECD from 1968. From 1971 to 1972 he served in Bratteli's First Cabinet as a State Secretary in the Office of the Prime Minister.

He returned to the same post in Bratteli's Second Cabinet from 1973 to 1976.

He died in September 1996 and was buried at Nordre gravlund.
