= Norsk pedagogisk tidsskrift =

- Discipline: Education
- Language: English
- Edited by: Merethe Roos

Publication details
- History: 1917–present
- Publisher: Universitetsforlaget (Norway)
- Frequency: Quarterly

Standard abbreviations
- ISO 4: Nor. Pedagog. Tidsskr.

Indexing
- ISSN: 0029-2052
- LCCN: 57048967

Links
- Journal homepage

Norsk pedagogisk tidsskrift (English: Norwegian Journal of Education) is a Norwegian research journal. The journal addresses the breadth of educational research. It publishes new research findings, thematizes public education discussions, and discusses current professional literature. Norsk pedagogisk tidsskrift was first published in 1917. As of 2020, the journal is issued quarterly. Its target readership is schoolteachers, students and academic staff at universities and colleges, teacher educators, and others interested in education.

The journal is edited by Merethe Roos.
