= Siri Hangeland =

Norwegian politician

President of the Norwegian Association for Women's Rights
- In office 1990–1992
- Preceded by: Irene Bauer
- Succeeded by: Bjørg Krane Bostad
- In office 1998–2004
- Preceded by: Kjellaug Pettersen
- Succeeded by: Berit Kvæven

Personal details
- Born: 1 April 1952 (age 74)
- Party: Socialist Left Party

Siri Hangeland (born 1 April 1952) is a Norwegian feminist, civic leader and politician.

She served two terms as president of the Norwegian Association for Women's Rights, from 1990 to 1992 and from 1998 to 2004. From 1996 to 1997 she served as a member of the Committee for Human Rights, a governmental committee appointed by the Ministry of Foreign Affairs. She was also a board member of the International Alliance of Women. She is a member of the Socialist Left Party and is a member of that party's committee on women's issues. She graduated with the cand.philol. degree in Norwegian language at the University of Bergen in 1981, with a dissertation titled Sosiolingvistiske forhold i Kristiansand bymål.
