= Sigmund Skard =

Norwegian poet, essayist and professor

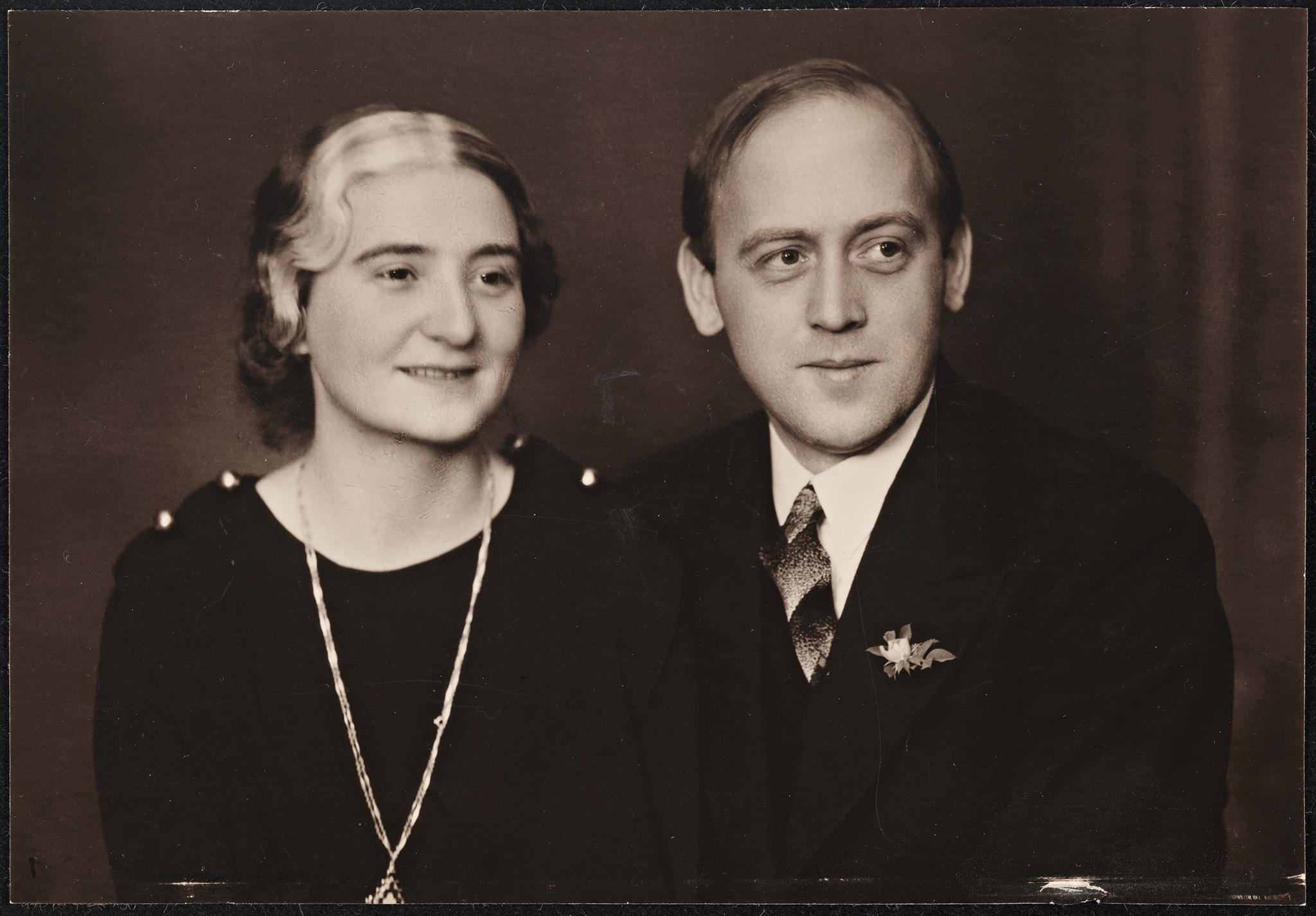
Sigmund Skard (right), with his wife Åse Gruda

Sigmund Skard (31 July 1903 – 26 May 1995) was a Norwegian poet, essayist and professor of American literature.

== Biography ==
Skard was born in Kristiansand, Norway. He was a son of educators Matias Skard (1846–1927) and Gyda Christensen (1868–1916). He was a brother of Bjarne Skard (1896–1961) who served as Bishop of the Diocese of Tunsberg, of University of Oslo professor Eiliv Skard (1898–1978), of senior lecturer Vemund Skard (1909-1992) and of teacher Gunnhild Skard (1912-1999). He was a half-brother of college teacher Målfrid Birkeland (1879-1963), of University of Agriculture professor Olav Skard (1881–1965) and of horticulturalist Torfinn Skard (1891–1970).

He graduated artium from Kristiansand Cathedral School in 1921. He attended the University of Oslo where he earned his Cand.philol. in literature history in 1931 and took his dr.philos. degree in 1938 with the thesis A. O. Vinje og antikken on noted poet and journalist Aasmund Olavsson Vinje (1818–1870). He was hired at the University Library of Oslo, and was connected to the Royal Norwegian Society of Sciences and Letters in Trondheim. During the Occupation of Norway by Nazi Germany, he moved with his wife and young children to the United States where he worked as a consultant at the Library of Congress (1941–43) and the United States Office of War Information (1943–45).

After the liberation of Norway at the end of World War II, he and his family settled at Lysaker in Akershus, Norway. He worked as the first professor in American literature at the University of Oslo from 1946 to 1973. He established the European Association for American Studies in 1954 and was the Chairman of the University International Summerschool 1958-68. A proponent of the Nynorsk language form, he was the secretary of the publishing house Det Norske Samlaget from 1930 to 1938, and chairman of the board from 1949 to 1972. Since 1995, Det Norske Samlaget has awarded an annual literary award which is named "Sigmund Skard-stipendet" in his honor.

Skard published ten poetry collections and translated both prose and poetry into the Norwegian language from Latin, French, Italian and English. He also wrote biographies about his father Matias Skard as well as of his in-laws, Halvdan Koht and Karen Grude Koht. Skard received numerous awards and was awarded honorary doctorates at several universities. In 1965, he won the Bastian Prize for the reprisal of Dante's Divine Comedy. Among other prestigious awards were the 1983 Arts Council Norway Honorary Award (Norsk kulturråds ærespris) and the 1992 Brage Prize (Brageprisens).

== Personal life ==
In January 1933, he married Åse Gruda Koht (1905–1985), the daughter of Halvdan Koht (1873–1965) and Karen Grude Koht (1871–1960). His wife was a noted pioneer in the field of childhood development and psychology. The couple had five children; Halvdan and Aasmund Skard (both born 1939), Torild Skard (born 1936) and Målfrid Grude Flekkøy (1936–2013) and Anne Skard (born 1945). He died during 1995 and was buried beside his wife at Haslum kirkegård in Bærum. He was a member of the Norwegian Association for Women's Rights, which was later headed by his daughter Torild Skard.

== Selected works ==
- ″The Voice of Norway″ (with H. Koht) - London 1943
- "Amerikanske problem" - 1949
- ″The American Myth and the European Mind. American Studies in Europe 1776-1960″ - Philadelphia 1961
- ″Norwegian Contributions to American Studies″ (with H.H.Wasser) - Philadelphia 1966
- Poppel ved flyplass - 1970
- Det levande ordet. Ei bok om Matias Skard - 1972
- Auga og hjarta - 1973
- Dikt i utval - 1973
- Ord mot mørket - 1976
- ″Transatlantica. Memoirs of a Norwegian Americanist″ - 1978
- ″Classical Tradition in Norway.″ An Introduction with Bibliography - 1980
- Solregn. Ein sjølvbiografi - 1980
- Mennesket Halvdan Koht - 1982
- Atterklang - 1987
- Karen Grude Koht. Drag av ein kvinnelagnad - 1987
- Norsk utefront i USA 1940–1945 - 1987
- Alders år. Ei minnebok - 1989

Awards
| Preceded by Brikt Jensen | Recipient of the Bastian Prize; 1965 | Succeeded by Hans Braarvig |
| Preceded by Halldis Moren Vesaas | Recipient of the Norsk kulturråds ærespris 1983 | Succeeded by Helge Sivertsen |
