= Nordre gravlund =

Cemetery in Oslo, Norway

Coordinates: 59°56′19″N 10°44′46″E

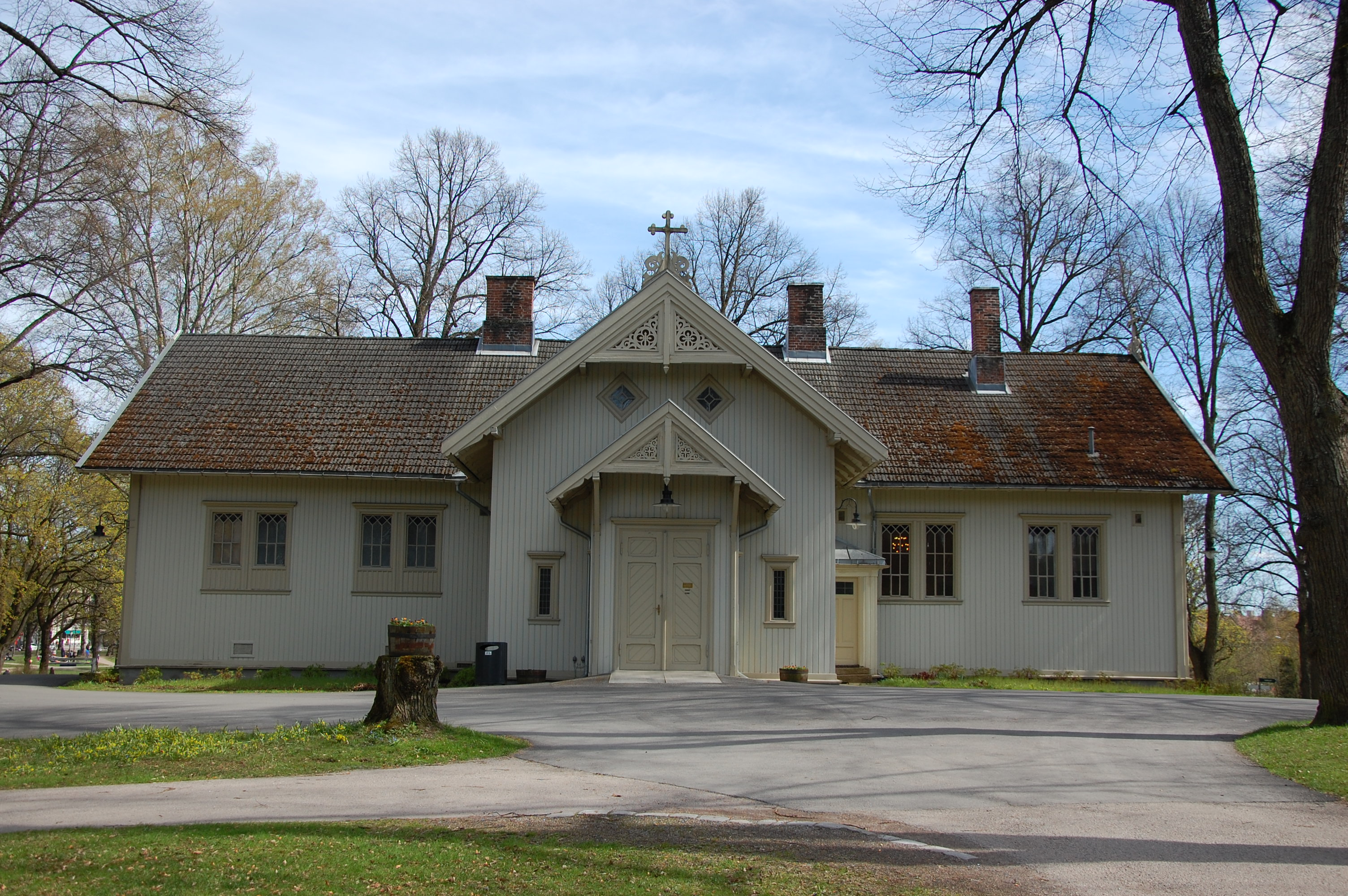
Chapel at Nordre gravlund

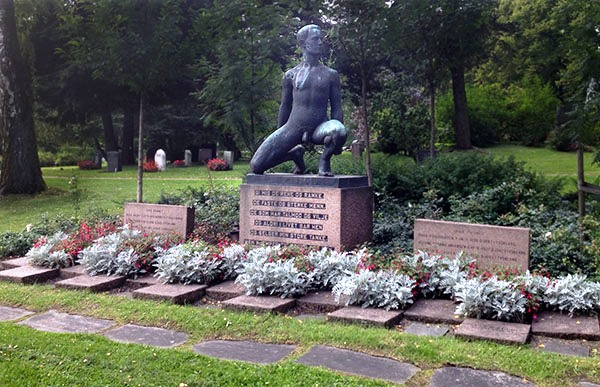
NKP Minnesbauta sculpture by Odd Hilt

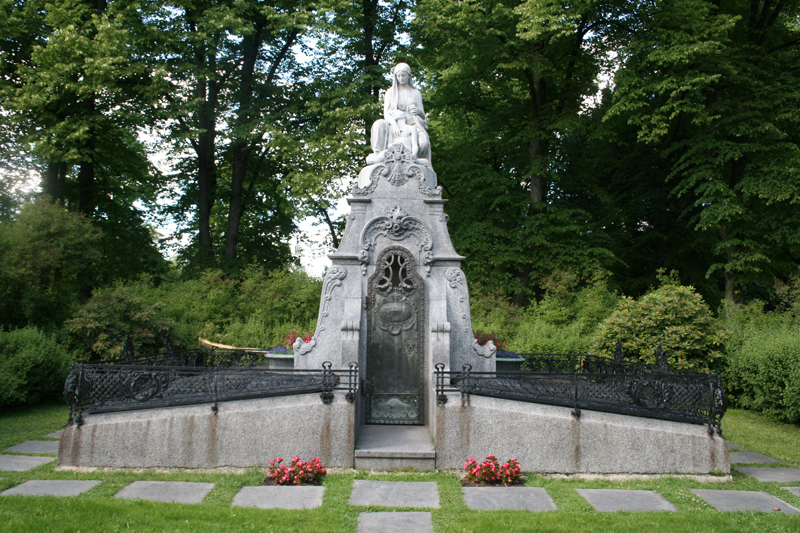
Sørgende kvinne sculpture by Gustav Lærum

Nordre gravlund in the autumn

Nordre Gravlund is a cemetery located between Ullevål University Hospital and the district of Sagene in Oslo, Norway.

== History ==
The cemetery was first established on the site in 1884. The cemetery has been expanded several times and now has an area of 16 hectares. There is a smaller chapel at the main entrance. Near the chapel is a memorial (NKP Minnesbauta) dedicated to the 23 members of the central committee of the Norwegian Communist Party who were killed during World War II. It was designed by sculptor Odd Hilt. The grave site for members of the Martinsen family contains the sculpture "Peace" (Fred) by sculptor Lars Utne.

== Notable burials ==
- Osmund Brønnum
- Cathinka Guldberg
- Anne Holsen
- Ivar Jørgensen
- Halvdan Koht
- Paul Koht
- Jolly Kramer-Johansen
- Arne Lie
- Martin Mehren
- Rudolf Nilsen
- Sølvi Wang
