= Anna Caspari Agerholt =

Norwegian women's rights activist

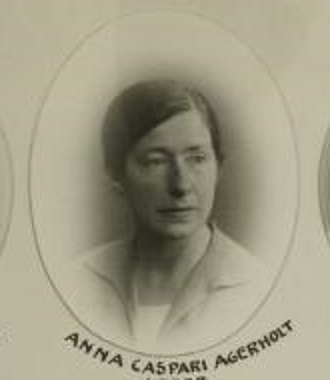
Anna Caspari Agerholt

Anna Caspari Agerholt (25 July 1892 – 16 August 1943) was a Norwegian women's rights activist and writer. She is remembered in particular for her groundbreaking Den norske kvinnebevegelses historie (The History of the Norwegian Women's Movement), published in 1937. Agerholt was a pioneering educator in social studies, giving a series of one-year courses for the Norwegian National Women's Council (Norske Kvinners Nasjonalråd).

== Biography ==
Born on 25 July 1892 in Kristiania, Anna Caspari was the daughter of Josef Immanuel von Zezschwitz Caspari (1857–1952), an academic, and Vilhelmine Christiane Sømme (1863–1952). On 28 December 1923, she married the archivist Peter Johan Agerholt (1890–1969).

Little is known of her childhood but in 1910, but when she took the matriculating Examen artium at Hamar School, Caspari chose to write a Norwegian composition on Kvindens stilling i samfundet før og nu (Women's place in society then and now). She went on to study philology at the University of Kristiania, graduating as Cand.philol. in 1917. The following year she earned a teaching diploma.

Initially she worked as a teacher at high schools in Lillehammer and Oslo but from 1925 she taught social history and Norwegian at the Norwegian National Women's Council. From 1931 to 1950, she was responsible for the one-year courses which were the only options for women wishing to work in the social sector. In addition to her articles in various journals, in 1937 she published her pioneering Den norske kvinnebevegelsens historie. Although it was initially well received by women's organizations, it was not until its republication in 1973 that it became a basic reference work for women's history in Norwegian universities. While she emphasizes the period up to 1913 when Norwegian women first obtained the vote in national elections, she also covers more generally the struggle for equality between women and men.

Agerholt was active in the bourgeois women's movement, chairing the Norske Kvinnelige Akademikeres Landsforbund (Norwegian Association for University Women) from 1932 to 1934. During the German occupation, for a short period she was secretary for the Norwegian National Women's Council. She attended many international conferences connected with the women's movement, becoming closely associated with leading women's rights activists.

Anna Caspari Agerholt died in Oslo on 17 August 1943.
