= Nils Ørvik =

Norwegian historian (1918–2005)

- Born: 3 January 1918; Skåtøy, Norway
- Died: 10 February 2005 (aged 87)
- Occupation: historian

Nils Ørvik (3 January 1918 – 10 February 2005) was a Norwegian historian, born in Skåtøy. He was appointed professor of international politics at the Queen's University in Kingston, Ontario in 1973. In 1975 he created the Queen's Centre for International Relations (now known as the Centre for International and Defence Policy), and was its director until his retirement in 1985.

== Selected works ==
- Norsk militær i Sverige. 1951.
- Sikkerhetspolitikken 1920–38. 1960–1961. (two volumes)
- Fears and Expectations. 1972.
- Sicherheit auf Finnisch. 1972.
- Northern Development – Northern Security. 1983..
