= Ludvig Ludvigsen Daae =

Norwegian historian

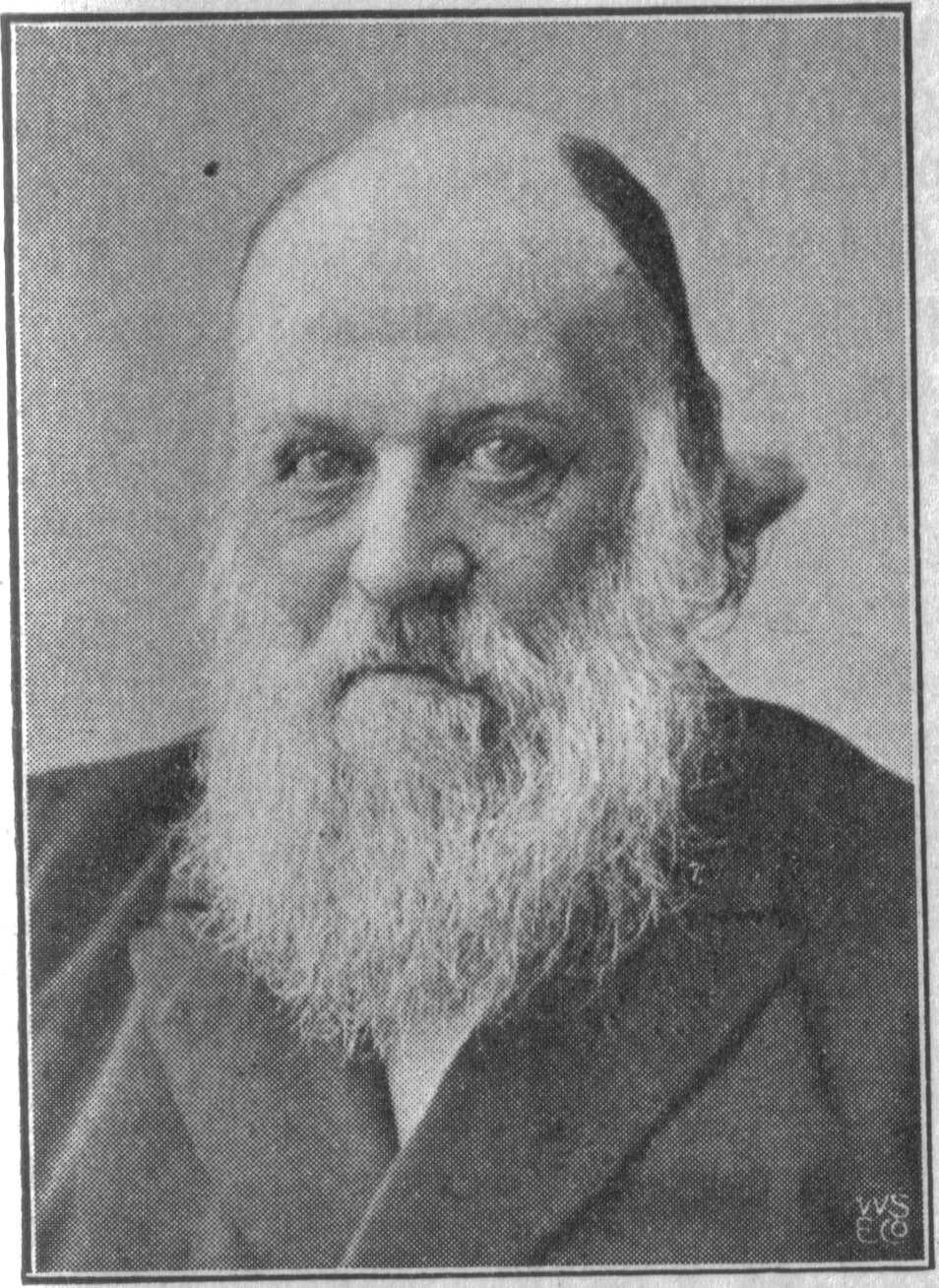
Ludvig Ludvigsen Daae

Ludvig Ludvigsen Daae (7 December 1834 – 17 March 1910) was a Norwegian historian and author. He was a professor at the University of Oslo for more than thirty years.

== Biography ==
He was born in Aremark in Østfold and died in Kristiania (now Oslo), Norway. He was the son of Ludvig Daae (1806–1835) and Sara Jessine Louise Brock (1811–1891). He was a student at Christiania Cathedral School and graduated during 1852. He studied classical philology at the University of Kristiania (now University of Oslo) and graduated in 1859.

Daae was assigned as a professor at the University of Kristiania for more than thirty years from 1876 to 1910. Daae was appointed professor of history at the university after Oluf Rygh had transferred to a professorship in archeology. At the time of his retirement his successor as a professor of history was Halvdan Koht.

Daae published a large number of historic works and was also a frequent contributor to newspapers. Among his other works in 1880 he wrote a biography of Ludvig Holberg and in 1899 he published an edition of Claus Pavels's diaries from the period 1817 to 1822. He was decorated Commander, Second Class of the Order of St. Olav in 1905. He was a Knight of the Danish Order of Dannebrog and of the Swedish Order of the Polar Star.

Ludvig Daae wrote his personal memoirs in 1888–1893 and in 1901. In 1944, Wilhelm Munthe published Professor Ludvig Daae : en minnebok (Oslo: Cammermeyer, 1944). In 2003, Daae's great-grandson, Nicolay Heinrich Knudtzon, edited and published an edition of Daae's memoirs.

== Selected works ==
- Kong Christiern den Førstes norske Historie (1879)
- Gerhard Schøning (1880)
- Om Humanisten og Satirikeren Johan Lauremberg (1884)
- Ludvig Holberg (1886)
- Det gamle Christiania (1891)

== Other sources ==
- Knudtzon, Nicolay Heinrich (2003) Professor, Dr. Ludvig Daaes erindringer og opptegnelser om sin samtid (Oslo: Novus Forlag) ISBN 82-7099-361-1
- Dahl, Ottar (1990) Norsk historieforskning i det 19. og 20. århundre(Oslo: Universitetsforlaget) ISBN 82-00-01593-9
