= Geilo Cultural Church =

Church in Buskerud, Norway

- Geilo kulturkyrkje
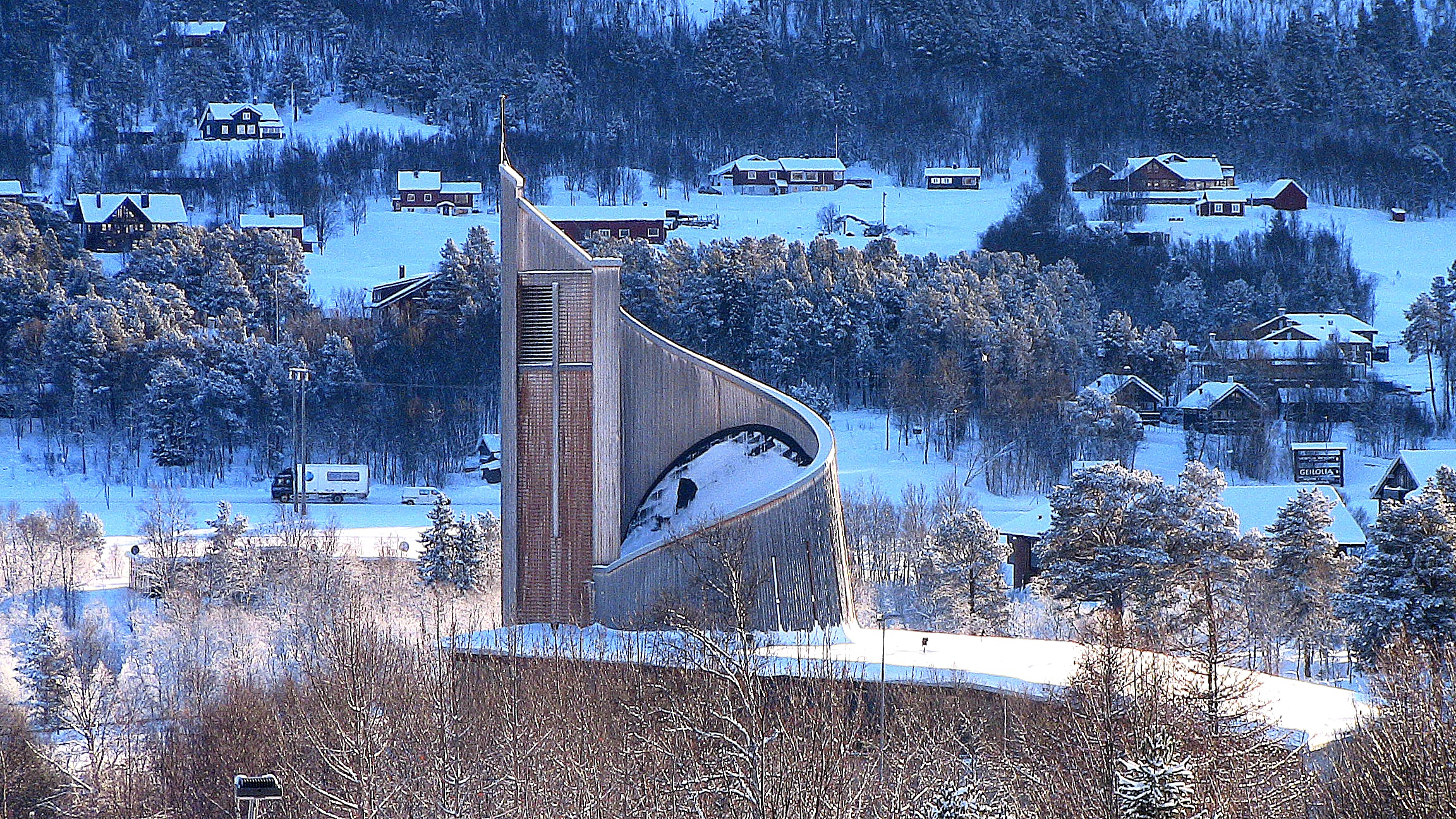
- View of the church
- Geilo Cultural Church
- 60°31′51″N 8°12′33″E
- Location: Hol, Buskerud
- Country: Norway
- Denomination: Church of Norway
- Churchmanship: Evangelical Lutheran

History
- Status: Parish church
- Founded: 2010
- Consecrated: 28 Nov 2010

Architecture
- Functional status: Active
- Architect: Jorunn Westad Brusletto
- Architectural type: Long church
- Completed: 2010 (16 years ago)

Specifications
- Capacity: 350
- Materials: Concrete

Administration
- Diocese: Tunsberg
- Deanery: Hallingdal prosti
- Parish: Geilo

Geilo Cultural Church (Norwegian: Geilo kulturkyrkje) is a parish church of the Church of Norway in Hol Municipality in Buskerud county, Norway. It is located in the village of Geilo. It is one of the churches for the Geilo parish which is part of the Hallingdal prosti (deanery) in the Diocese of Tunsberg. The concrete, glass, and wood church was built in a long church design in 2010 using plans drawn up by the architect Jorunn Westad Brusletto. The church seats about 350 people.

The term "cultural church" implies that the building is also open to various cultural events that do not necessarily have a Christian focus. The facility includes several non-consecrated spaces, such as a church plaza, an art gallery, and meeting halls. The building has thus been described as a type of multi-purpose church for the community.

== History ==
The Ustedalen Chapel (sometimes known as Geilo Church) served the village of Geilo for a long time. Over time it became too small for the congregation, so plans for a new, larger church were made. The new church was going to be built along the shore of the Usteåne river about 500 metres (1,600 ft) south of the site of the chapel. The new building was designed by Jorunn Westad Brusletto from W&B architects. The church is made of concrete, glass, and wood. The church was completed in 2010 and consecrated on 28 November 2010. After it was opened, this church has replaced the old Ustedalen Chapel as the main parish church.

== Media gallery ==
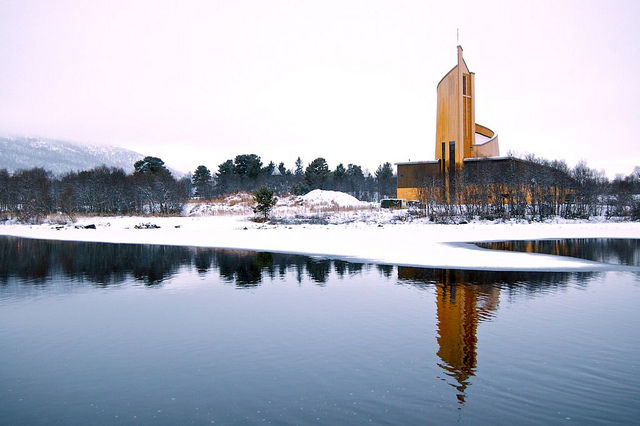

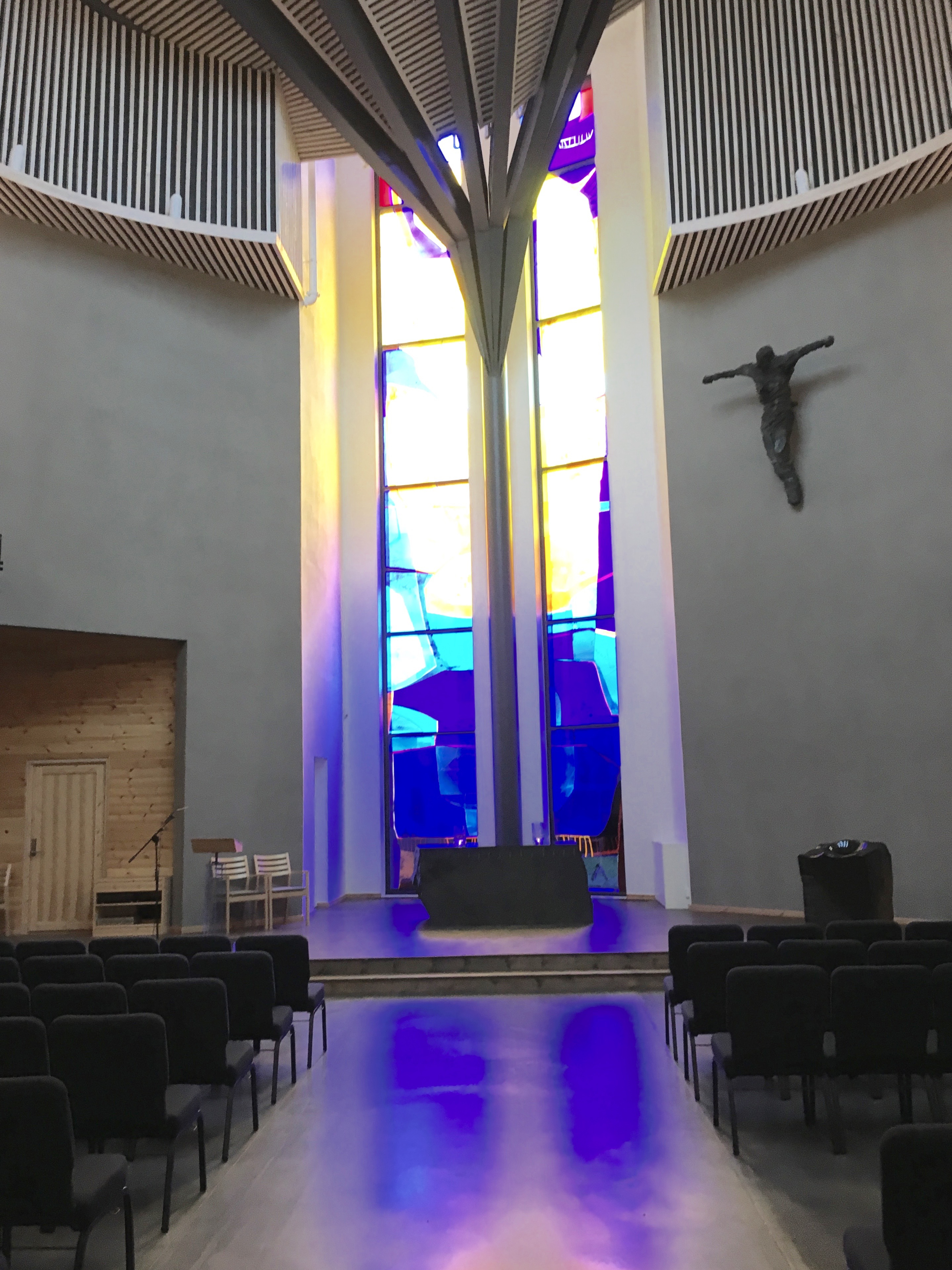

== See also ==
- List of churches in Tunsberg
