= Tuft Church =

Church in Buskerud, Norway

- Tuft kirke
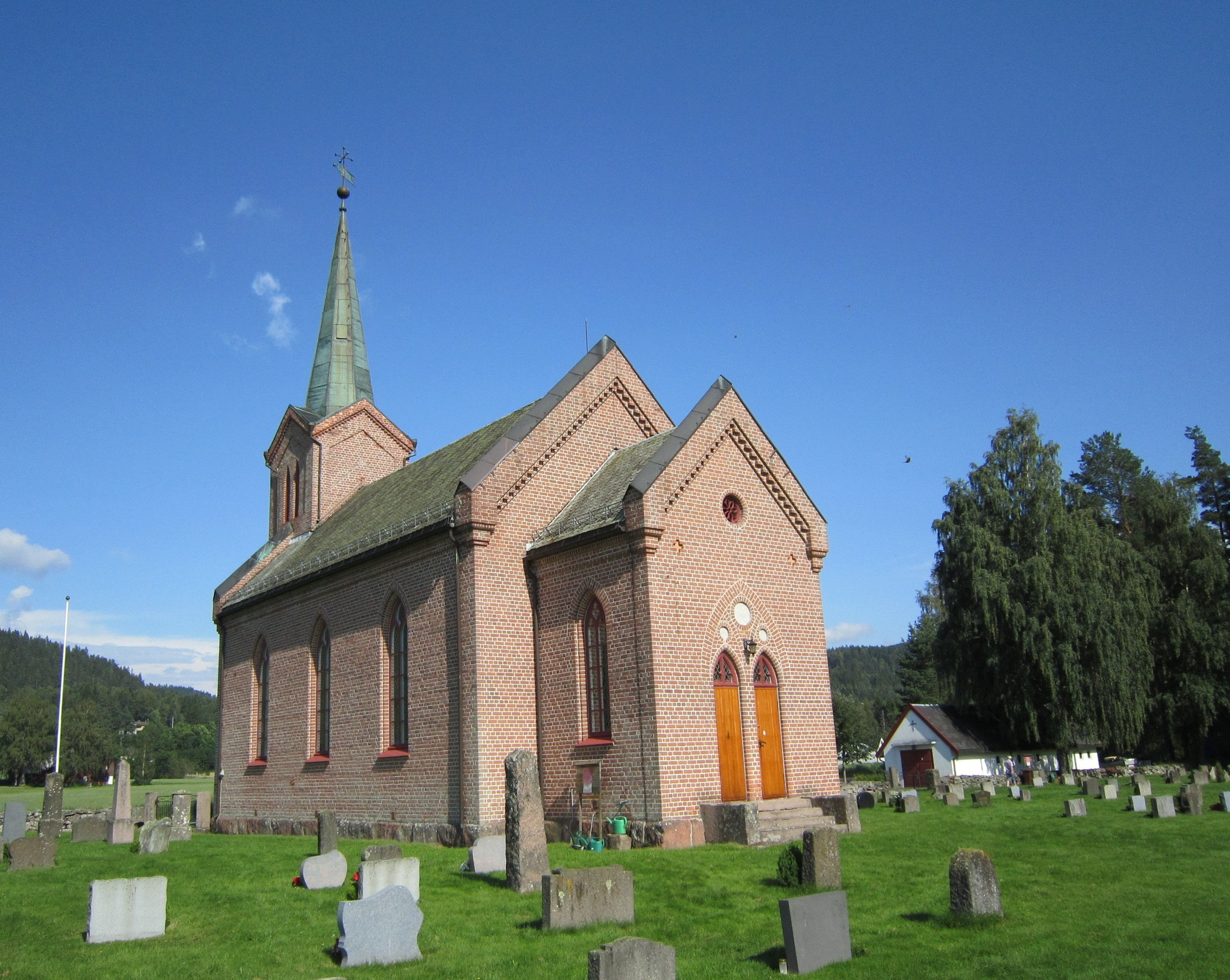
- View of the church
- Tuft Church
- 59°29′31″N 10°00′40″E
- Location: Kongsberg Municipality, Buskerud
- Country: Norway
- Denomination: Church of Norway
- Previous denomination: Catholic Church
- Churchmanship: Evangelical Lutheran

History
- Status: Parish church
- Founded: c. 1200
- Consecrated: 20 Sept 1880

Architecture
- Functional status: Active
- Architect: Torkil Johansen Aschehoug
- Architectural type: Long church
- Completed: 1880 (146 years ago)

Specifications
- Capacity: 150
- Materials: Brick

Administration
- Diocese: Tunsberg
- Deanery: Kongsberg prosti
- Parish: Tuft
- Norwegian Cultural Heritage Site
- Type: Church
- Status: Listed
- ID: 85683

Tuft Church (Norwegian: Tuft kirke) is a parish church of the Church of Norway in Kongsberg Municipality in Buskerud county, Norway. It is located in the village of Hvittingfoss. It is the church for the Tuft parish which is part of the Kongsberg prosti (deanery) in the Diocese of Tunsberg. The red brick church was built in a long church design in 1880 using plans drawn up by the architect Torkil Johansen Aschehoug. The church seats about 150 people.

== History ==
The earliest existing historical records of the church date back to the year 1366, but the church was not built that year. The first church here dates to around the year 1200 on the basis of two preserved portals. Christian Christie describes a simple, single-nave long church where the nave measured approximately 11.55 by 5.05 metres (37.9 ft × 16.6 ft). The approximately square choir had the same width as the nave, but it was originally narrower, about 2.9 metres (9 ft 6 in) wide. Several attempts were made to close the church site after the Reformation. This was decided in 1624, and in 1629 the bells were transferred to Komnes Church and eventually also the baptismal font. However, opposition led to the decision being reversed. Later attempts to close it down were also opposed by the local residents. The church, like most other churches in Norway, was sold into private ownership during the Norwegian church sale in 1723 to help the King pay off war debts. It was sold to the local congregation in 1832. By 1880, the church was in poor condition and too small for the congregation, so it was decided to tear down the church and to replace it with a new building.

Drawings for the new church were prepared by Dean Torkil Johansen Aschehoug and the roof structures were designed by Abraham Foss. The drawings were presented to the architect Jacob Wilhelm Nordan in 1874, who then proposed some changes. Final drawings were prepared by master builder Christian Hansen, who also led the construction work. The church was consecrated on 20 September 1880. It is a long church in red brick (from Ole Pedersen Tuft's brickworks) on a foundation of red granite. The church has a tower with a porch at the entrance in the northeast, the nave is rectangular, and the choir is the same width as the nave, while the floor is two steps up in relation to the floor of the nave. In the southwest there is a sacristy extension that is narrower and lower. A pointed arched, shallow alter niche in the southwest leads into the sacristy extension.

== See also ==
- List of churches in Tunsberg
