= Torfinn Skard =

Norwegian horticulturist, teacher, librarian and author

Torfinn Skard (20 January 1891 – 11 June 1970) was a Norwegian horticulturist, teacher, librarian and author.

== Personal life ==
He was born at Faaberg Municipality in Oppland county, Norway. He was the son of educator Matias Skard (1846–1927) and his second wife Nilsine Kristiane Myhre (1860–1891). He was a nephew of Johannes Skar, Christopher Bruun and Per Bø and a half-brother of Olav Skard (a son of Matias from his first marriage) and Bjarne, Eiliv and Sigmund Skard (whom Matias had by his third wife). Torfinn's mother died in childbirth after having him.

Torfinn married Aagot Sofie Lien (1898–1973) in December 1922 in Solum Municipality. When Sigmund Skard married Åse Gruda Skard, Åsa became Torfinn's sister-in-law, and he was thereby also an uncle of Målfrid Grude Flekkøy, Torild Skard and Halvdan Skard.

== Career ==
Torfinn Skard was an apprentice in horticulture at three different schools between 1907 and 1911, and studied at two different folk schools including Askov folkehøiskole in Denmark from 1916-17. He studied at the Norwegian College of Agriculture at Ås in Akershus from 1917 to 1919. He worked at the Telemark School of Agriculture (Telemark Landbruksskole) at Søve from 1919 to 1958. He also led Telemark Agricultural Library from 1936 to 1958.

He wrote several historical books about Norwegian horticulture, as well as the textbook Dyrking av grønnsaker, frukt og bær (1937). His main work was Hagebruk og gartneri i Norge (1963). His own book collection was donated to the Norwegian College of Agriculture. In 1961 he was awarded the King's Medal of Merit (Kongens fortjenstmedalje) in gold. He died in June 1970 at Skien.
