= Efteløt =

Village in Kongsberg Municipality, Norway

- Village
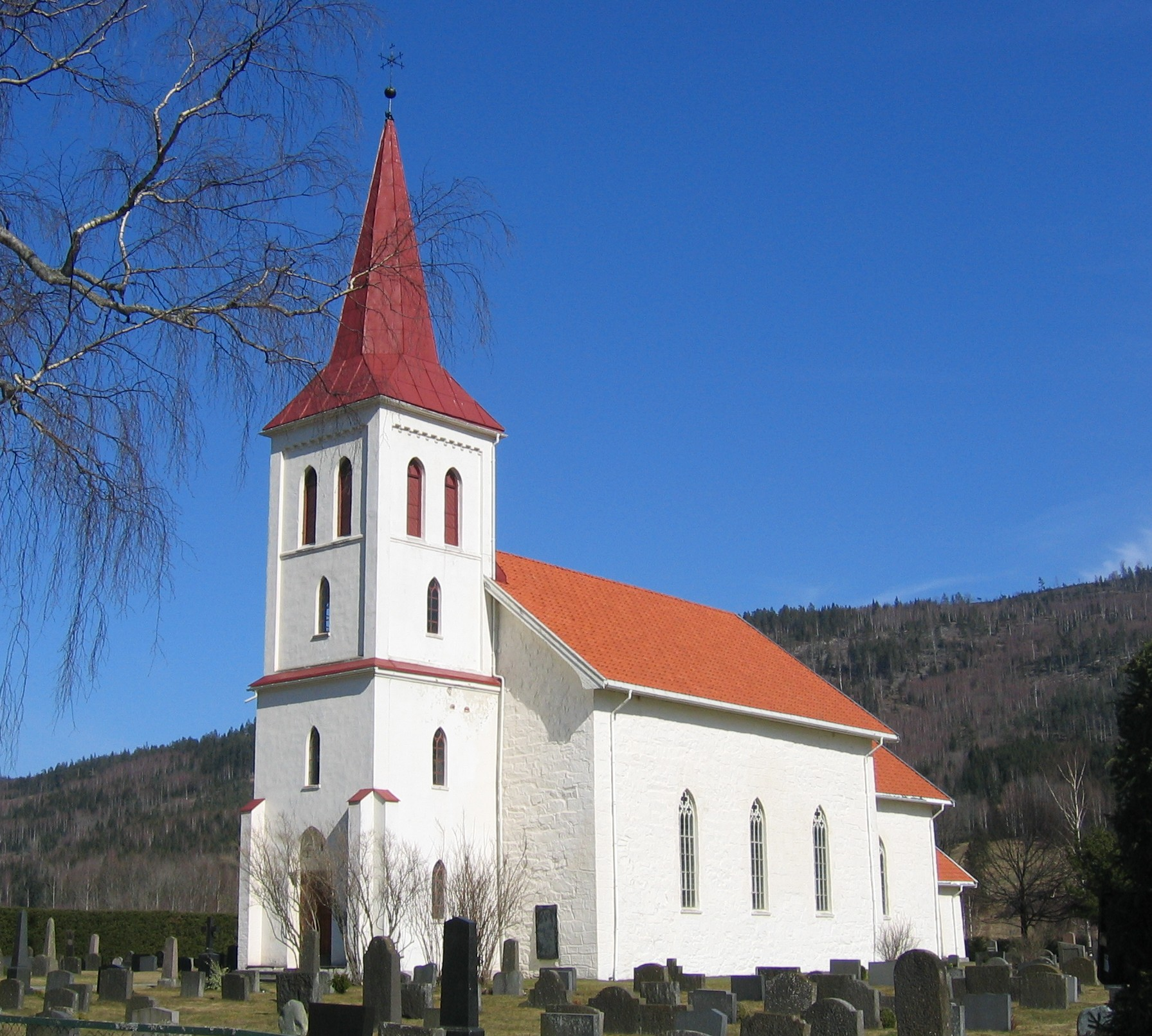
- View of the village church
- Interactive map of Efteløt
- Coordinates: 59.55066°N 9.80979°E
- Country: Norway
- Region: Eastern Norway
- County: Buskerud
- District: Lower Buskerud
- Municipality: Kongsberg Municipality
- Elevation: 73 m (240 ft)
- Time zone: UTC+01:00 (CET)
  - Summer (DST): UTC+02:00 (CEST)
- Post Code: 3618 Skollenborg

Efteløt is a village in Kongsberg Municipality in Buskerud county, Norway. The village is located along the river Numedalslågen, about 15 kilometres (9.3 mi) southeast of the town of Kongsberg and about 15 kilometres (9.3 mi) northwest of the village of Hvittingfoss.

Efteløt is the location of Efteløt school and Efteløt Church. Efteløt Church was first constructed in Romanesque style around the year 1184. It is stone church with walls of natural stone up to 1 metre (3 ft 3 in) thick. It was rebuilt in 1876 into a more Gothic style. The church was restored in 1953.
