= Tønsberg Cathedral =

Church in Vestfold, Norway

- Tønsberg domkirke
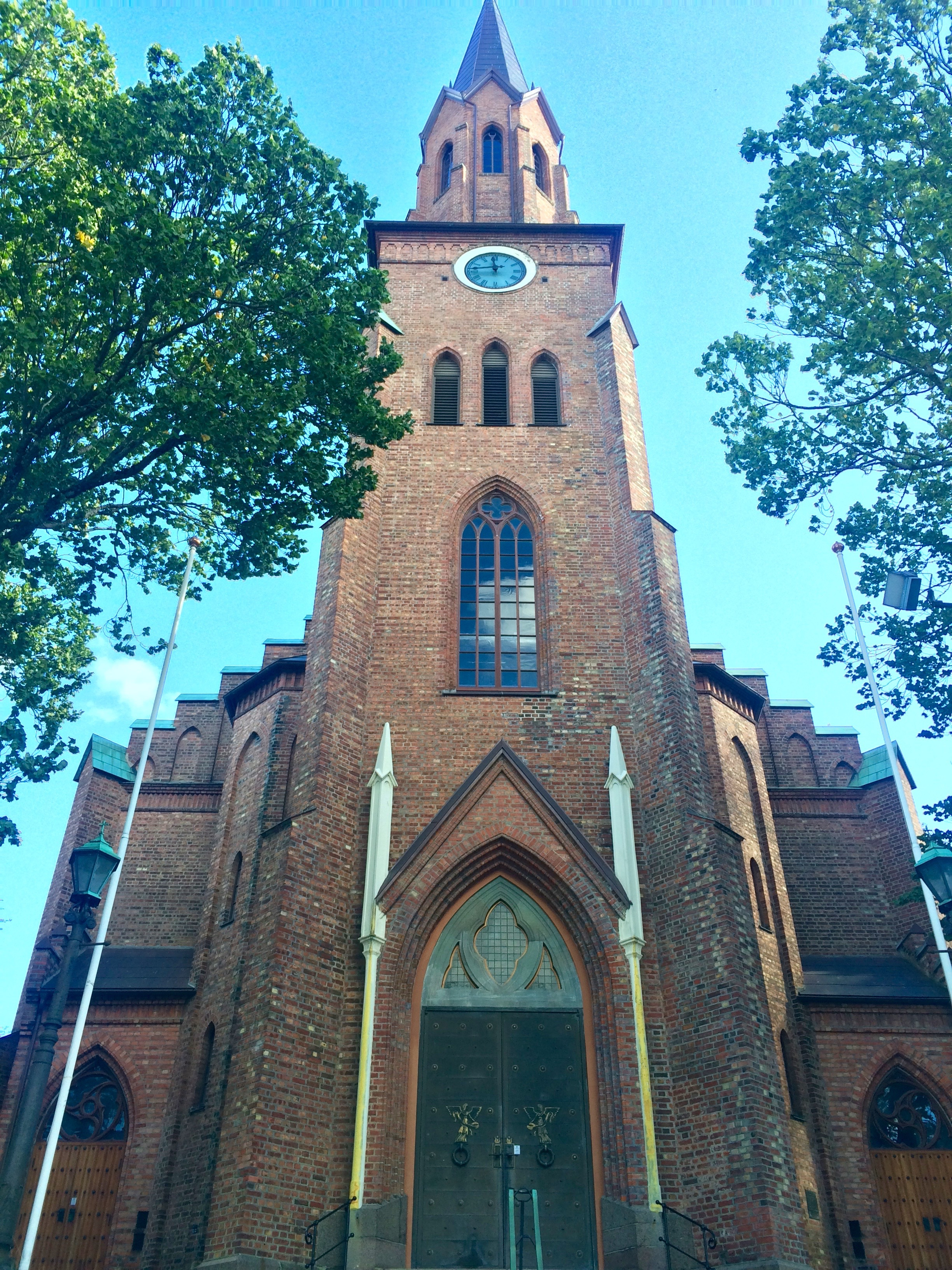
- View of the church
- Tønsberg Cathedral
- 59°16′09″N 10°24′16″E
- Location: Tønsberg Municipality, Vestfold
- Country: Norway
- Denomination: Church of Norway
- Previous denomination: Catholic Church
- Churchmanship: Evangelical Lutheran

History
- Former name(s): St. Laurentius' Church (St Lavrans kirke); Tønsberg Church (Tønsberg kirke)
- Status: Cathedral
- Founded: 11th century
- Consecrated: 19 Dec 1858

Architecture
- Functional status: Active
- Architect: C.H. Grosch
- Architectural type: Long church
- Style: Gothic
- Completed: 1858 (168 years ago)
- Closed: 1814-1858

Specifications
- Capacity: 500
- Materials: Brick

Administration
- Diocese: Tunsberg
- Deanery: Tønsberg domprosti
- Parish: Tønsberg domkirke
- Norwegian Cultural Heritage Site
- Type: Church
- Status: Listed
- ID: 85705

Tønsberg Cathedral (Norwegian: Tønsberg domkirke) is a cathedral that is the episcopal seat of the Diocese of Tunsberg within the Church of Norway. It is located in the centre of the city of Tønsberg in Tønsberg Municipality in Vestfold county, Norway. It is the main church for the "Tønsberg domkirke" parish which is part of the Tønsberg domprosti (deanery) in the Diocese of Tunsberg. The brown brick church was built in a long church design in 18 using plans drawn up by the architect . The church seats about 500 people.

Originally a parish church, it was elevated to cathedral status in 1948 when the Diocese of Tunsberg was created and separated from the Diocese of Oslo.

== History ==
=== St. Laurentius' Church ===
The earliest existing historical records of the church date back to the year 1200, but the church was not built that year. The first church in Tønsberg was likely a wooden church that was built as early as 1018, according to the Saga of St. Olaf. In the early 12th century, the wooden church was torn down and replaced with a stone basilica church that was dedicated to St. Laurentius. That church was known as Lavranskirken (St. Laurentius' Church). It was one of several churches in Tønsberg, one of the oldest towns in medieval Norway. The oldest customary episcopal seat in Eastern Norway was likely located in Tønsberg with the episcopal complex at Teigar, and Lavranskirken is considered to have been built by the king as the bishop's cathedral.

There have been various descriptions of the church's appearance, but one famous description portrays the church's "large respectable choir and its many immeasurably thick pillars". There are also some sketches that show the church room with rows of columns separating the main nave from the side naves, and with a choir with a curved apse. On drawings, the church is often depicted with roof trusses. It is also said that the church had a high tower. The choir was remodeled in the 13th century. The town fire in 1536 razed most of the town to the ground and significantly damaged the church. The church burned down again in 1683, but was rebuilt.

Maintaining several centuries-old churches in Tønsberg started to become a problem during the late-1700s. In 1777, a demand was raised that the town should concentrate on maintaining only one church and it was decided to focus on St. Mary's Church, not the St. Laurentius' Church. The decision was made to demolish the St. Laurentius' Church in 1809. The demolition was carried out from 1810-1814 and most of the stone and other materials were sold to raise money for the town. After a 30 or so years, St. Mary's Church also became too small and in need of significant repairs. Eventually, it was decided to tear down the St. Mary's Church and build a new town hall and town square on that site and to build one new church for Tønsberg on the site of the old St. Laurentius' Church which had been torn down years earlier.

=== Present church ===
The new church was to be built on the site of the old St. Laurentius' Church which was torn down in 1814. Site was cleared an prepared in the autumn of 1855 and the architect Christian Heinrich Grosch was hired to design the new Brick Gothic church. The granite foundation was laid in the spring of 1856 and the work progressed for two years. The church was built under the direction of Paul Thrane. The church was completed in 1858 and it was consecrated by the Bishop Jens Lauritz Arup on 19 December 1858.

Many of the interior furnishings of the church were taken from the old St. Mary and St. Laurentius Churches. The church has richly carved decorations including figures representing the four Evangelists and their personal symbols. The Baroque altar was carved by Jens Jølsen in 1764. The altarpiece shows Jesus' struggle at Gethsemane. It was painted in 1760 by Jacob Pederssøn Lindgaard (1719–1789). The pulpit, created by unknown local artisans, is from 1621. The church also owns two 16th-century Holy Bibles, one from 1550 and one from 1589. The baptismal font is by sculptor Christopher Borch (1817–1896) and was donated by Svend Foyn. In the grounds of the church, a bronze statue of Svend Foyn by the sculptor Anders Svor (1864–1929) was unveiled in 1915. The cathedral was remodeled in 1939 with a restoration led by architect Arnstein Arneberg.

After World War II, the government voted to create the new Diocese of Tunsberg which would be based in Tønsberg. The Tønsberg Church was chosen to be the seat of the new diocese. On 20 June 1948, Tønsberg Church was re-consecrated as a cathedral. The first bishop to lead the new diocese was Bjarne Skard.

== Media gallery ==
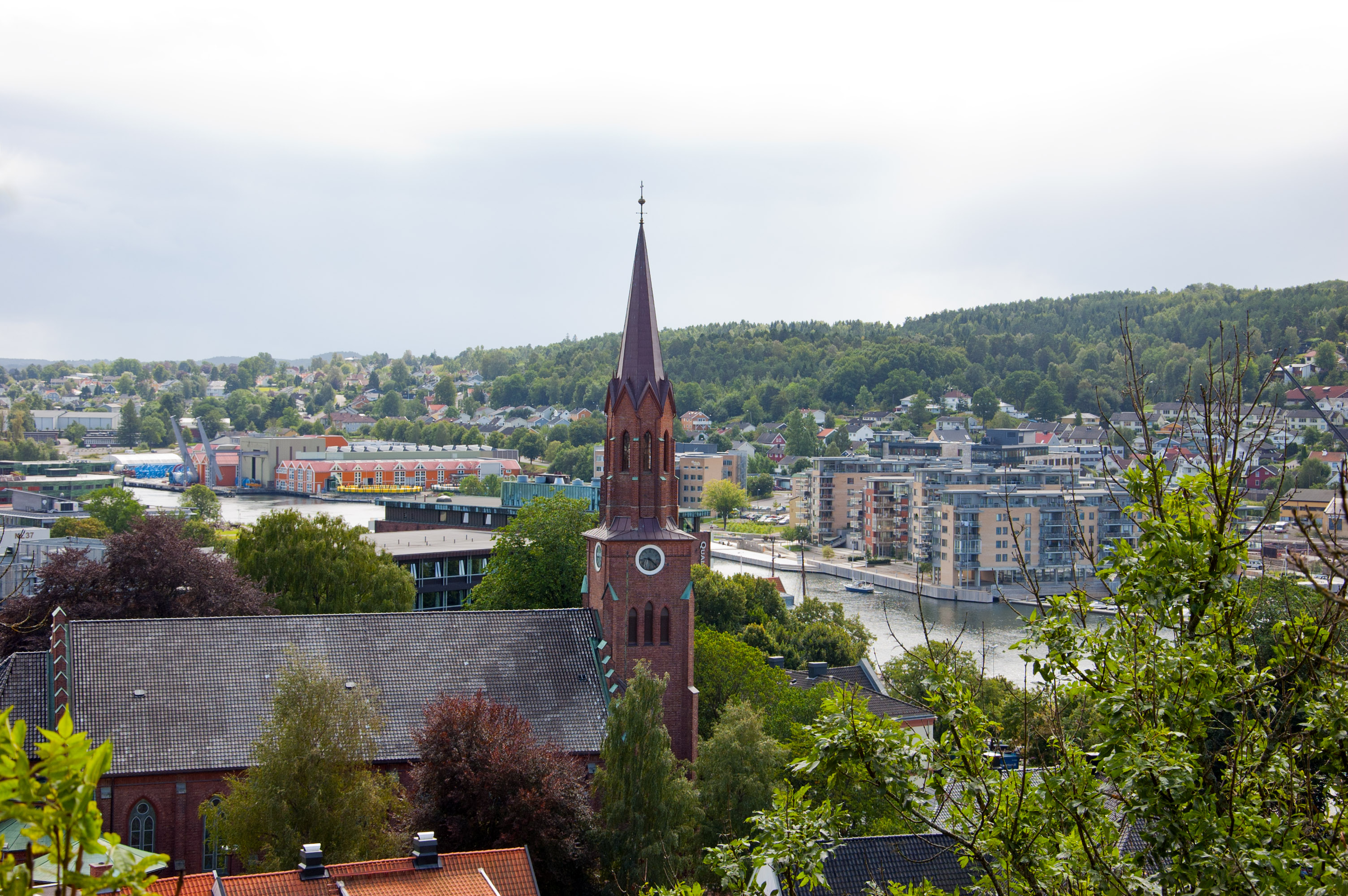
The cathedral, located in central Tønsberg

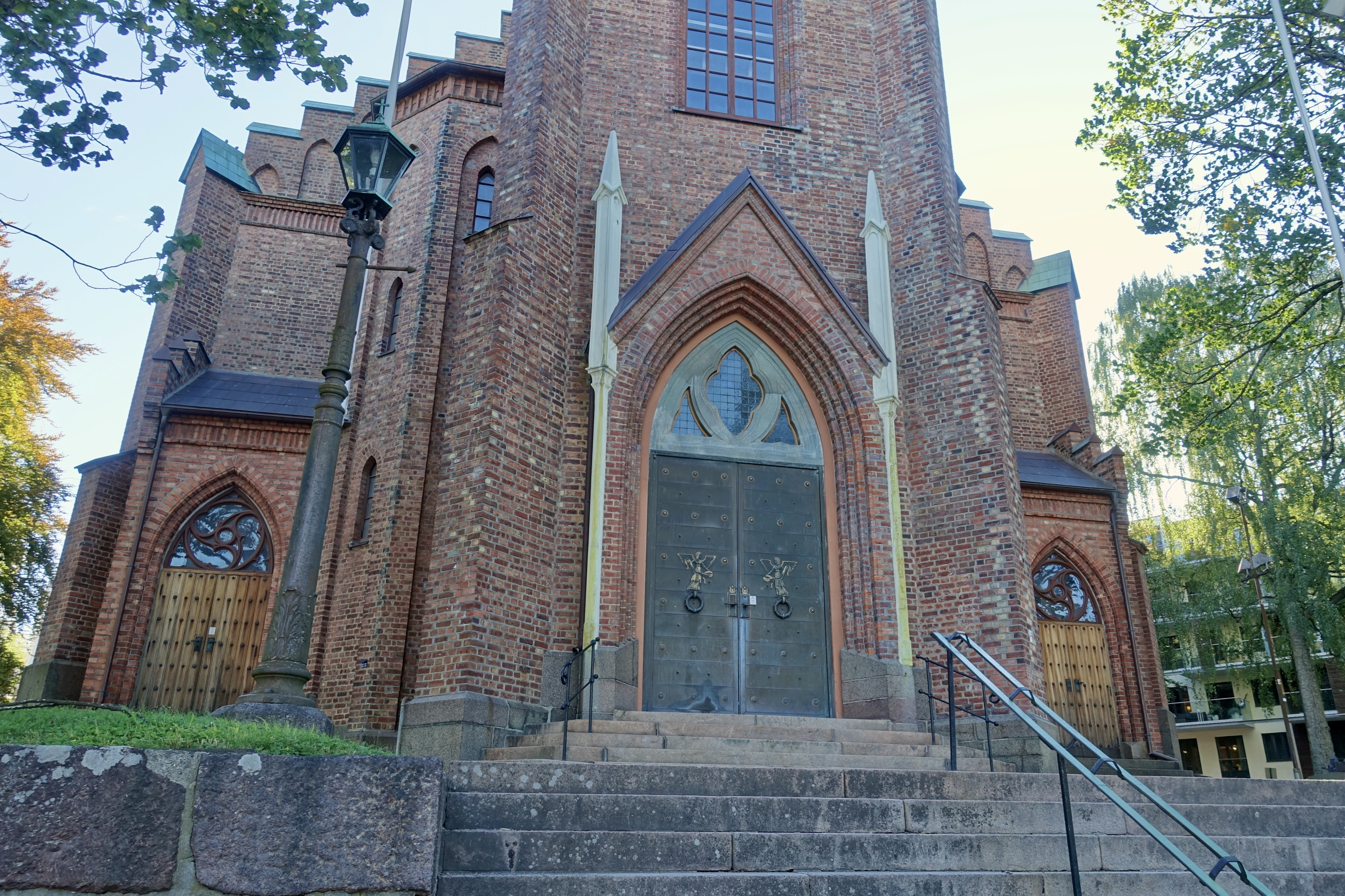

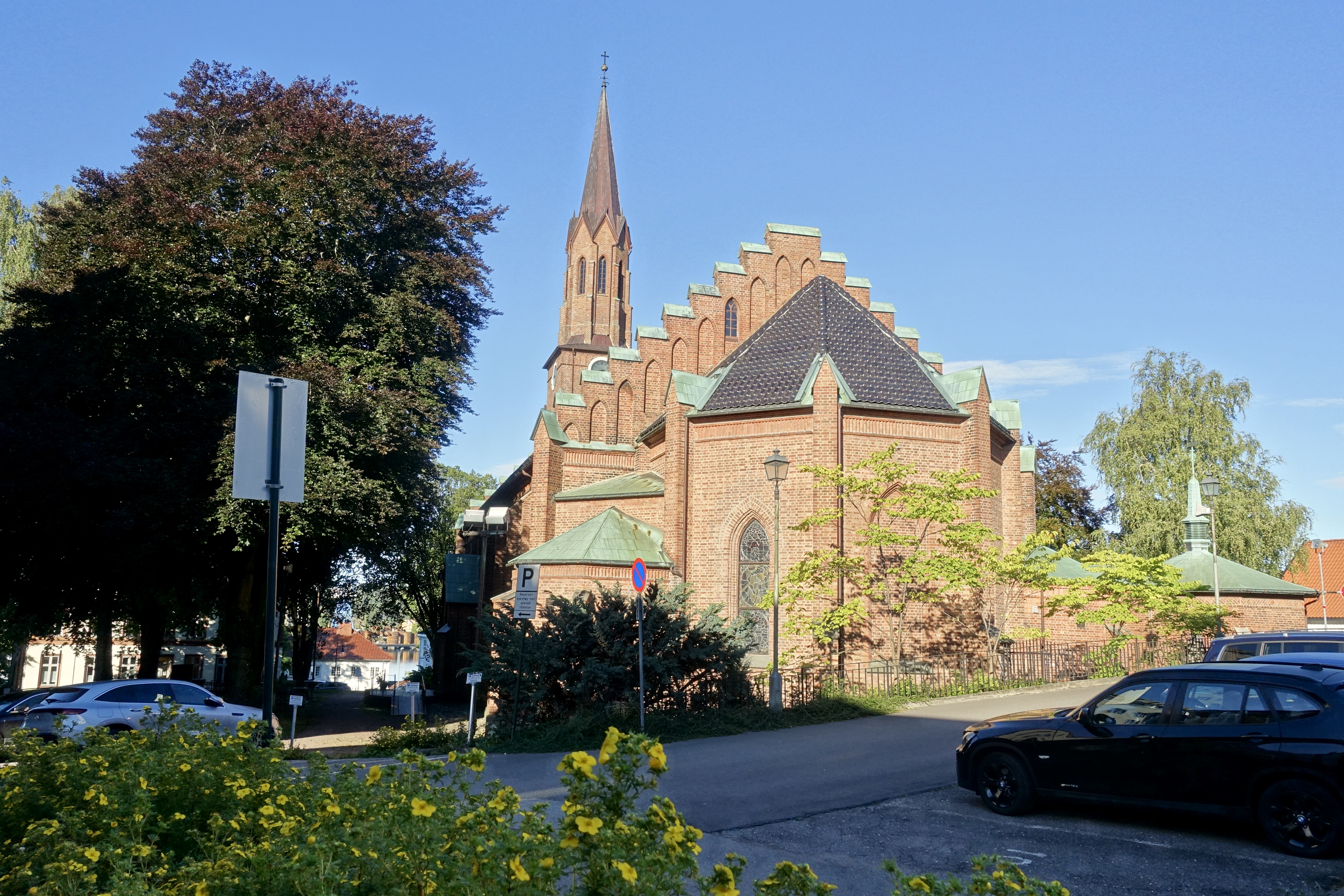

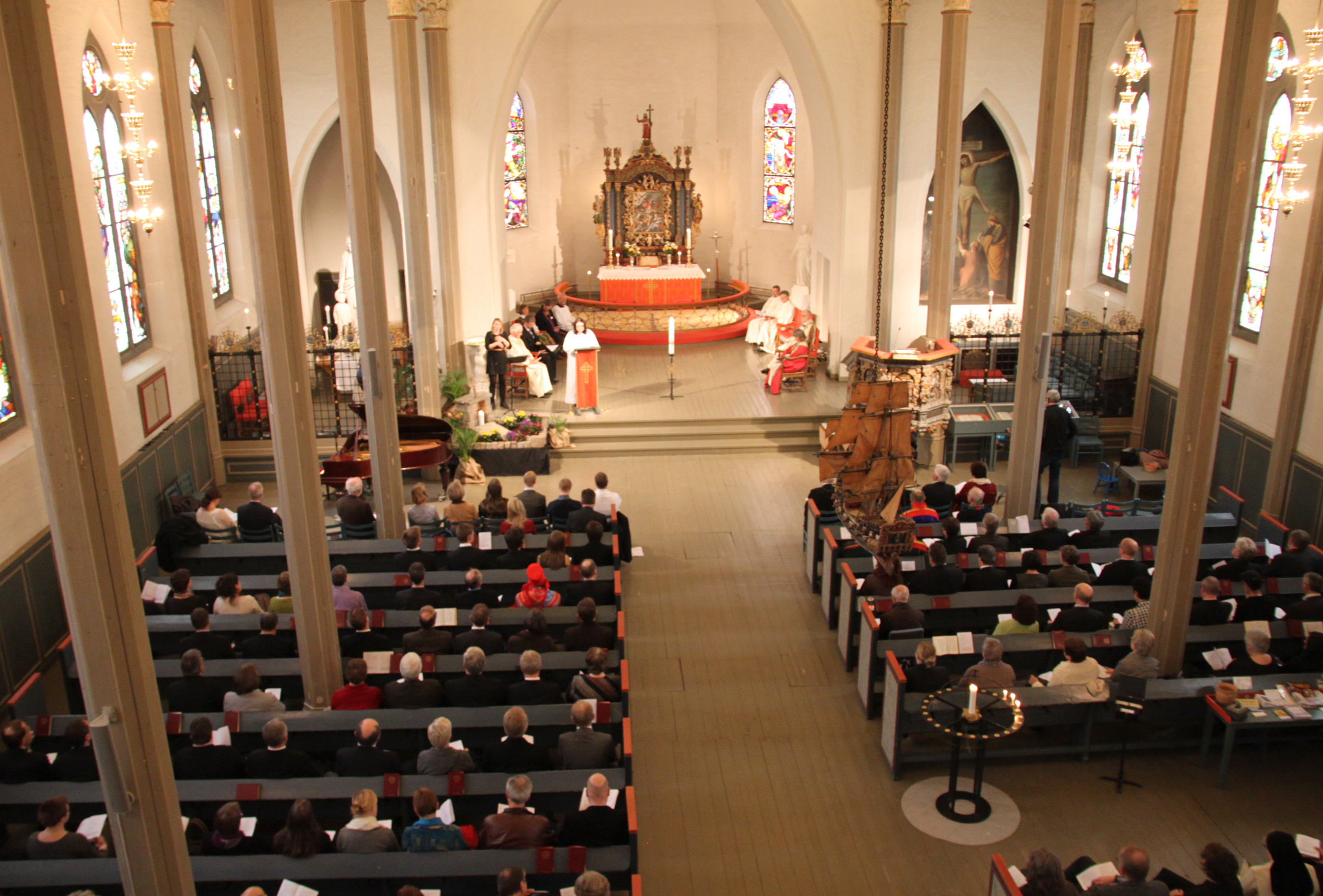
Interior, Tønsberg Cathedral during a service.

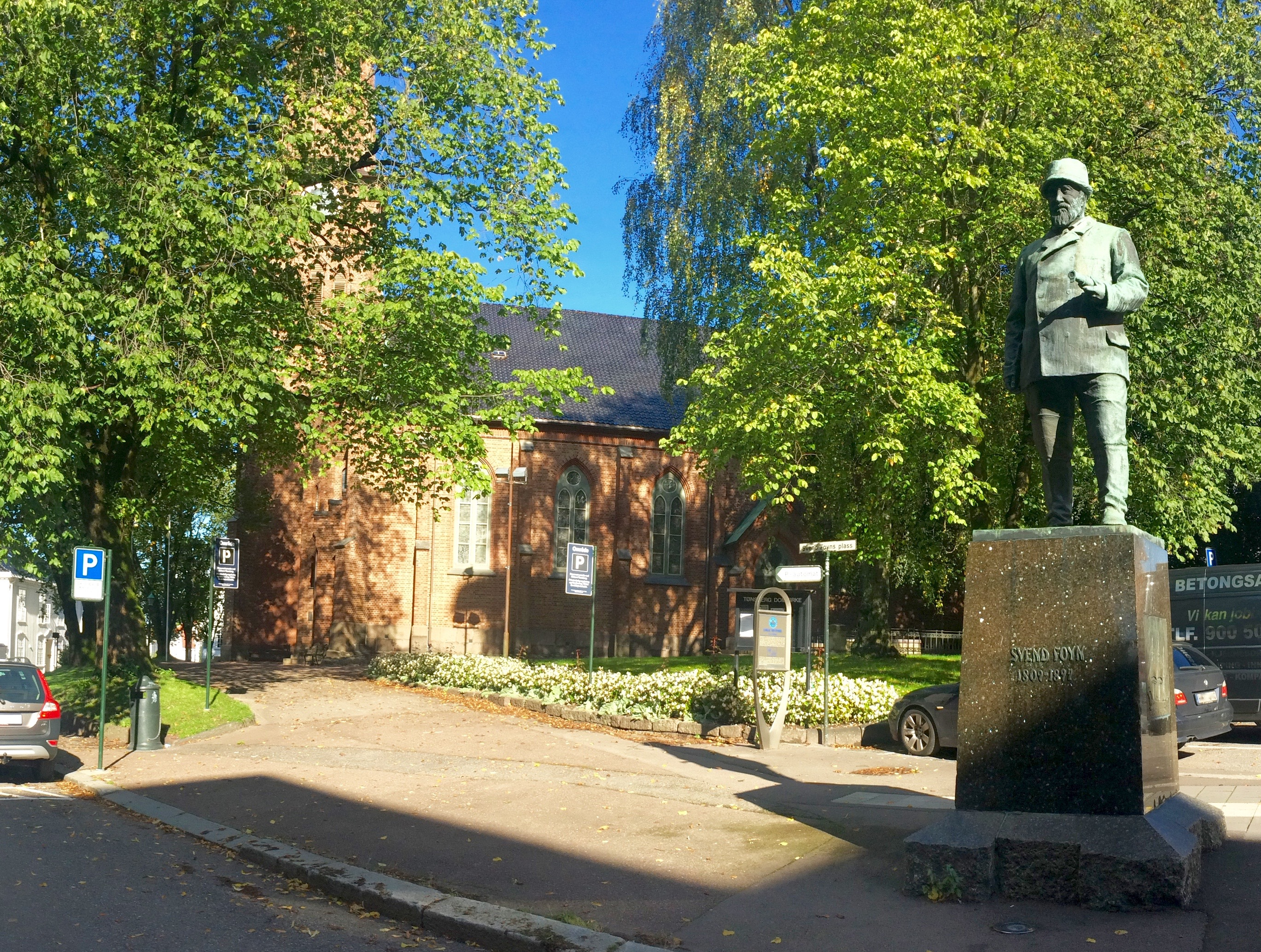
Statue of Svend Foyn by Anders Svor from 1915

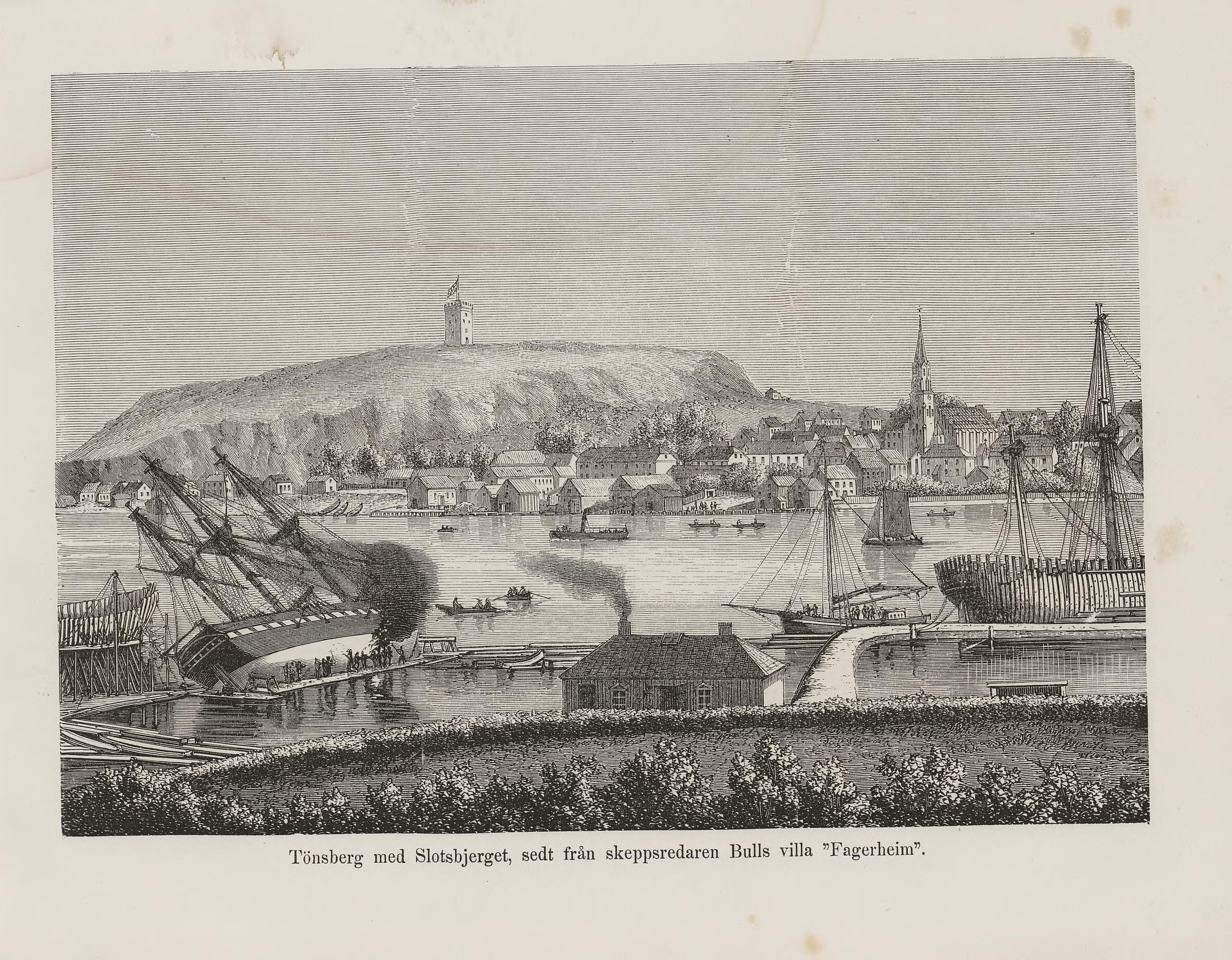
Drawing of the city from 1868 including the spire of the church

== See also ==
- List of cathedrals in Norway
- List of churches in Tunsberg
