= Olav Skard =

Norwegian educator, magazine editor and horticulturalist

Olav Matiasson Skard (27 October 1881 – 15 May 1965) was a Norwegian educator, magazine editor and horticulturalist.

== Personal life ==
He was born in Østre Gausdal Municipality as a son of educators Matias Skard (1846–1927) and his first wife Marie Bø (1849–1883). His father was an educator and school director. He was a half-brother of Torfinn, Bjarne, Eiliv and Sigmund Skard. His uncle was folklorist Johannes Skar. When Sigmund Skard married Åse Gruda Skard, Åsa became Olav's sister-in-law, and he was also an uncle of Halvdan Skard, Målfrid Grude Flekkøy and Torild Skard. In February 1908 he married Wally Bjerregaard (1879–1966).

== Career ==
He grew up in Østre Gausdal Municipality and Levanger Municipality, and attended agriculture school in Hylla, before enrolling at the Norwegian College of Agriculture, where he graduated with a degree in horticulture in 1904. He was a teacher at various gardening schools from 1904 to 1918, and from 1919 to 1934 he was a secretary in Selskapet Havedyrkningens Venner (SVH) and editor of their magazine Norsk Hagetidend. From 1921 he was also a board member of SVH, and he later became an honorary member. He was appointed as a professor at the Norwegian College of Agriculture in 1934, and remained there until 1956 (he officially retired in 1951). In 1948 he was appointed a Knight First Class of the Royal Norwegian Order of St. Olav. He died in May 1965 at Oslo.
