= Komnes Church =

Church in Buskerud, Norway

- Komnes kirke
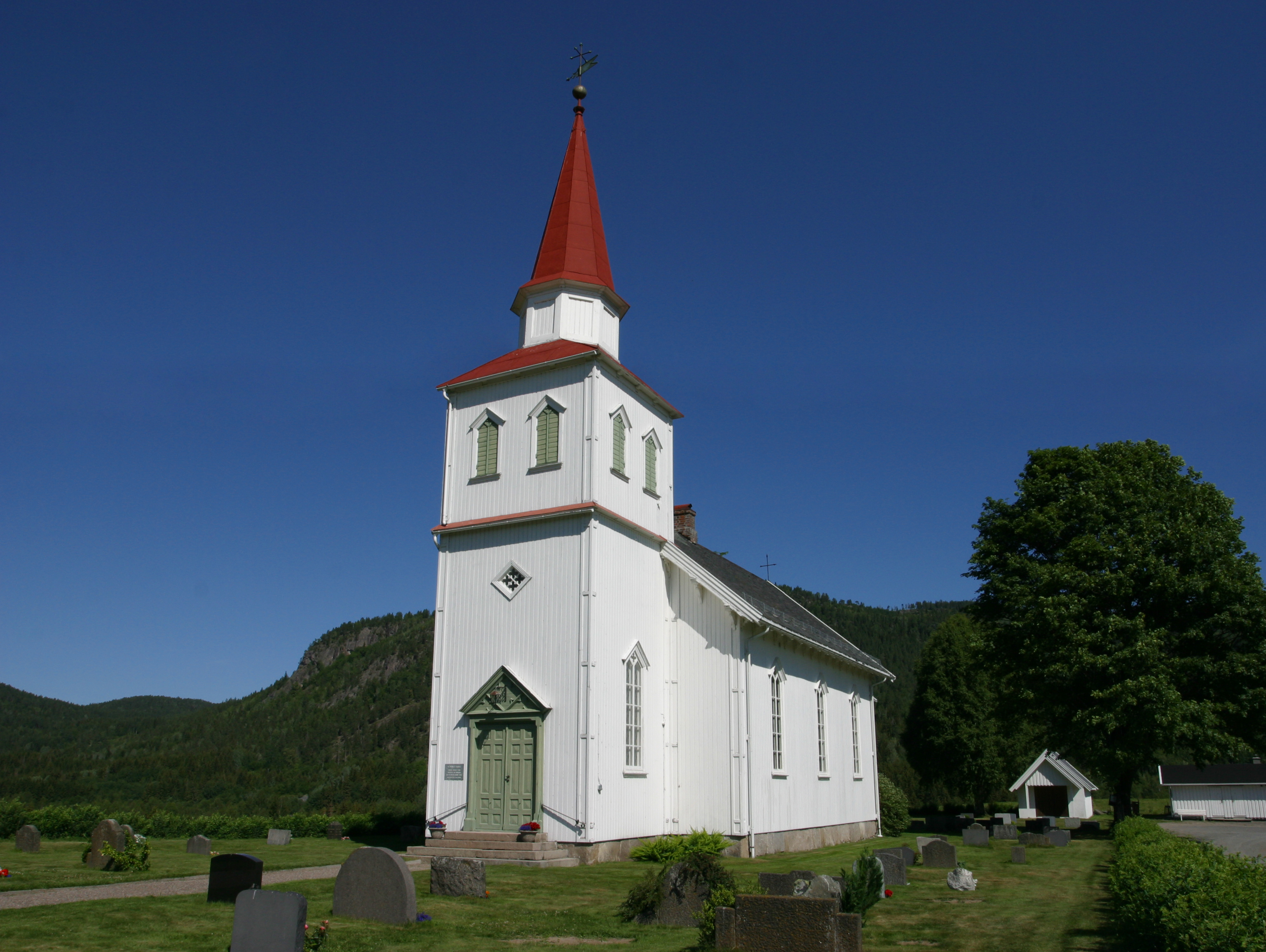
- View of the church
- Komnes Church
- 59°30′22″N 9°54′46″E
- Location: Kongsberg Municipality, Buskerud
- Country: Norway
- Denomination: Church of Norway
- Previous denomination: Catholic Church
- Churchmanship: Evangelical Lutheran

History
- Status: Parish church
- Founded: 13th century
- Consecrated: 4 Sept 1881

Architecture
- Functional status: Active
- Architectural type: Long church
- Completed: 1881 (145 years ago)

Specifications
- Capacity: 170
- Materials: Wood

Administration
- Diocese: Tunsberg
- Deanery: Kongsberg prosti
- Parish: Komnes
- Norwegian Cultural Heritage Site
- Type: Church
- Status: Not protected
- ID: 84809

Komnes Church (Norwegian: Komnes kirke) is a parish church of the Church of Norway in Kongsberg Municipality in Buskerud county, Norway. It is located in the village of Komnes. It is the church for the Komnes parish which is part of the Kongsberg prosti (deanery) in the Diocese of Tunsberg. The white, wooden church was built in a long church design in 1881 using plans drawn up by an unknown architect. The church seats about 170 people.

== History ==
The earliest existing historical records of the church date back to the year 1395, but the church was not built that year. The first church at Komnes was a wooden stave church that was likely built during the 13th century. The church, like most other churches in Norway, was sold into private ownership during the Norwegian church sale in 1723 to help the King pay off war debts. It had the same owner until 1795 when it was sold to the owner of the Komnes farm. The municipality took over ownership in 1865. By then, the stave church was considered too small and frail, and in 1873 it was decided to build a new church.

Originally, the new church was to be built in brick, but due to problems obtaining bricks, it was made of wood. In 1881, a new church was built just north of the old church and the stave church was demolished afterwards with most of the furnishings (altarpiece, pulpit, baptismal font) being transferred to Efteløt Church, where it is still in use. The new church is a neo-Gothic timber-framed long church. The new building was consecrated on 4 September 1881. It has a tower with a church porch, a rectangular nave with a choir that was the full width of the nave, and a sacristy extension with rooms for the priest and the children to be baptized.

== See also ==
- List of churches in Tunsberg
