= Eggedal Church =

Church in Buskerud, Norway

- Eggedal kirke
- View of the church
- Eggedal Church
- 60°14′46″N 9°21′26″E
- Location: Sigdal, Buskerud
- Country: Norway
- Denomination: Church of Norway
- Previous denomination: Catholic Church
- Churchmanship: Evangelical Lutheran

History
- Status: Parish church
- Founded: 13th century
- Consecrated: 18 Sept 1878

Architecture
- Functional status: Active
- Architect(s): Støren and Steenstrup
- Architectural type: Long church
- Completed: 1878 (148 years ago)

Specifications
- Capacity: 300
- Materials: Wood

Administration
- Diocese: Tunsberg
- Deanery: Eiker prosti
- Parish: Eggedal
- Norwegian Cultural Heritage Site
- Type: Church
- Status: Listed
- ID: 84056

Eggedal Church (Norwegian: Eggedal kirke) is a parish church of the Church of Norway in Sigdal Municipality in Buskerud county, Norway. It is located in the village of Eggedal. It is the church for the Eggedal parish which is part of the Eiker prosti (deanery) in the Diocese of Tunsberg. The white, wooden church was built in a long church design in 1878 using plans drawn up by the architects Støren and Steenstrup. The church seats about 300 people.

== History ==
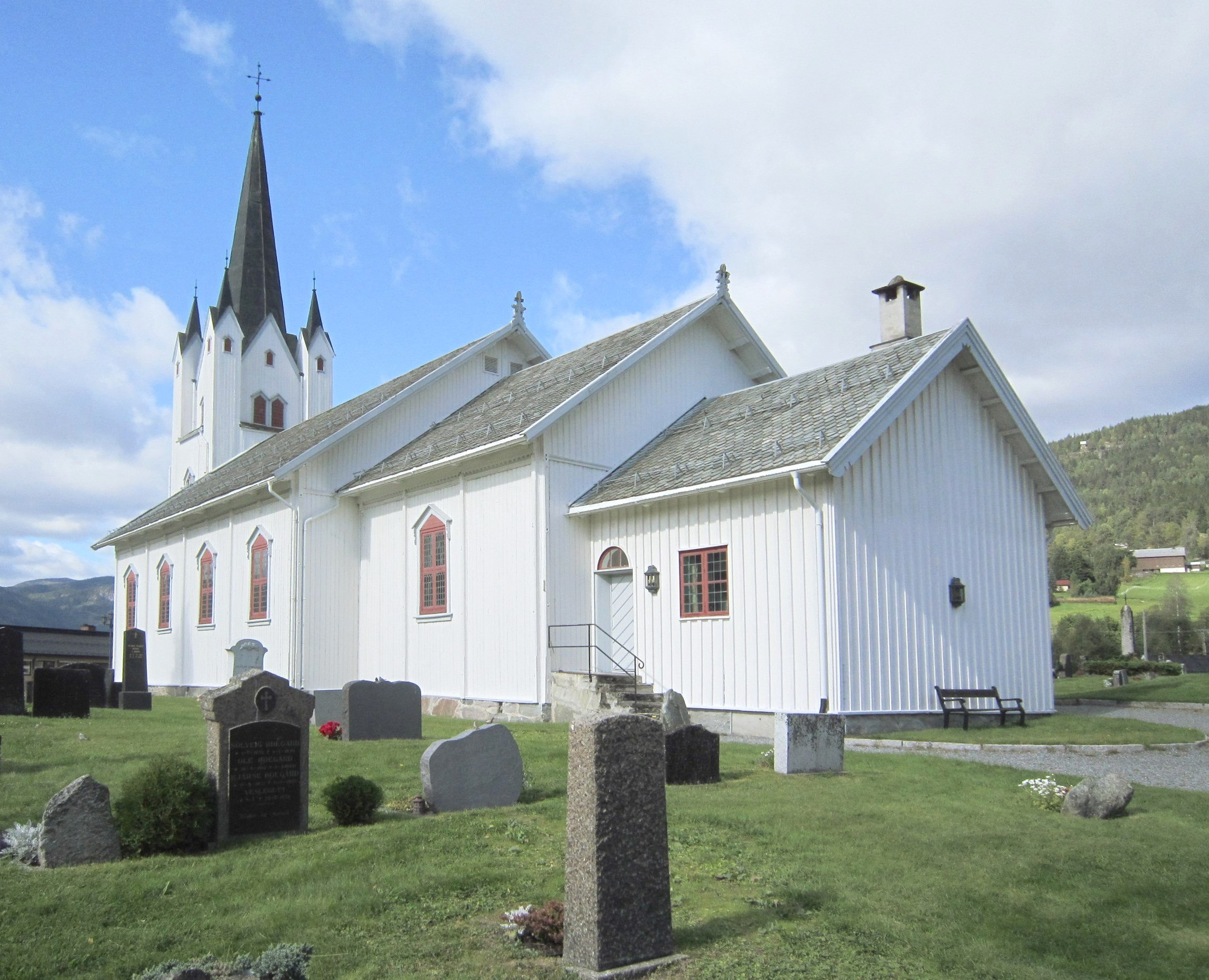
View of the church

The earliest existing historical records of the church date back to the year 1334, but the church was not built that year. The first church at Eggedal was a wooden stave church located about 1 kilometre (0.62 mi) northwest of the present-day church site. The old stave church was built on the Hovland farm likely during the 13th century. The stave church was remodeled several times, and it was eventually rebuilt into a cruciform church, like so many other small stave churches. We know the interior partly through a picture that Ernst Josephson painted in 1872.

The old stave church was demolished in 1881 after the new church was built about 1 kilometre (0.62 mi) to the southeast in the village of Eggedal. The new church was consecrated in 1878 (the cemetery at the stave church was in use until 1905). The new Eggedal Church was designed by the engineers Støren and Steenstrup, and the drawings were corrected by Jacob Wilhelm Nordan, who was the Ministry of Church Affairs' consultant in building matters. Originally, the intention was to build the church at Hovland, but the plans were changed in 1876, and the church was built in the village, closer to the main road. The builder was Gulbrand Johnsen from Nes, who also built a lot of churches in Romerike. The church was consecrated on 18 September 1878.

== See also ==
- List of churches in Tunsberg
