= Jan Otto Myrseth =

Swedish bishop

The Right Reverend Jan Otto Myrseth
- Bishop of Tunsberg
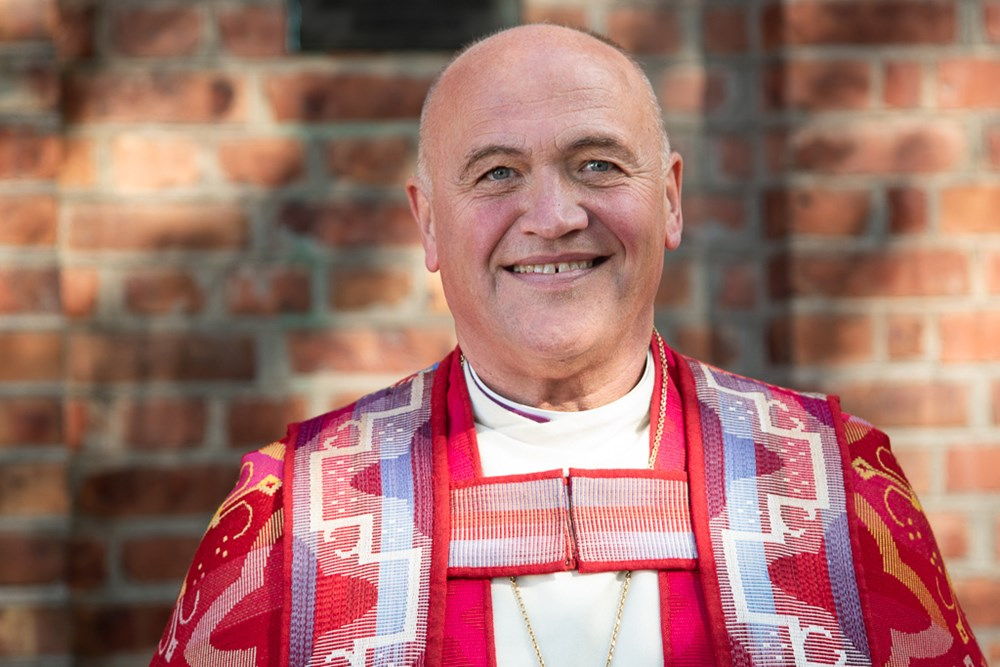
- Church: Church of Norway
- Diocese: Tunsberg
- Elected: 6 June 2018
- In office: 2018–present
- Predecessor: Per Arne Dahl

Orders
- Ordination: 1989
- Consecration: 23 September 2018 by Helga Haugland Byfuglien

Personal details
- Born: 30 August 1957 (age 68) Sykkylven, Møre og Romsdal, Norway
- Denomination: Lutheran

Jan Otto Myrseth (born 2 July 1957) is a Norwegian prelate who is the current Bishop of Tunsberg.

== Biography ==
Myrseth completed his theological studies in 1988 and was ordained in the summer of 1989. After serving as vicar in the Diocese of Tunsberg since 1989, he was appointed vicar of the parish of Norderhov in 1991. On December 17, 2004, he was appointed Dean of the Ringerike deanery. He was appointed to the office on Sunday, April 24, 2005. Myrseth also served as a hospital chaplain and as lecturer at the theological faculty of the Theological seminary of the University of Oslo. In 2010 he became the Provost of Bergen Cathedral. On June 6, 2018, he was elected as bishop of Tunsberg by the Church Council and was consecrated in September of the same year.

Religious titles
Preceded by Per Arne Dahl	Bishop of Tunsberg; 2018–current	Incumbent
