= Sigurd Osberg =

Norwegian bishop

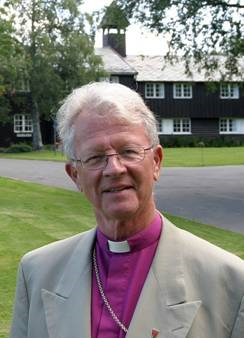
- Born: 31 December 1933 (age 92); Bergen, Norway
- Occupation: Bishop

Sigurd Fredrik Osberg (born 31 December 1933) is a retired Norwegian bishop.

He was born in Bergen, took the cand.theol. degree in 1960 and was ordained in 1961. He worked as a chaplain at Ringsaker Church from 1969 to 1976, as a vicar in Åssiden from 1976 to 1987 and in Høvik from 1987 to 1990. From 1991 to 2002 he served as the bishop of the Diocese of Tunsberg.

Church of Norway titles
Preceded by Håkon E. Andersen	Bishop of Tunsberg; 1991–2002	Succeeded by Laila Riksaasen Dahl
