= Efteløt Church =

Church in Buskerud, Norway

- Efteløt kirke
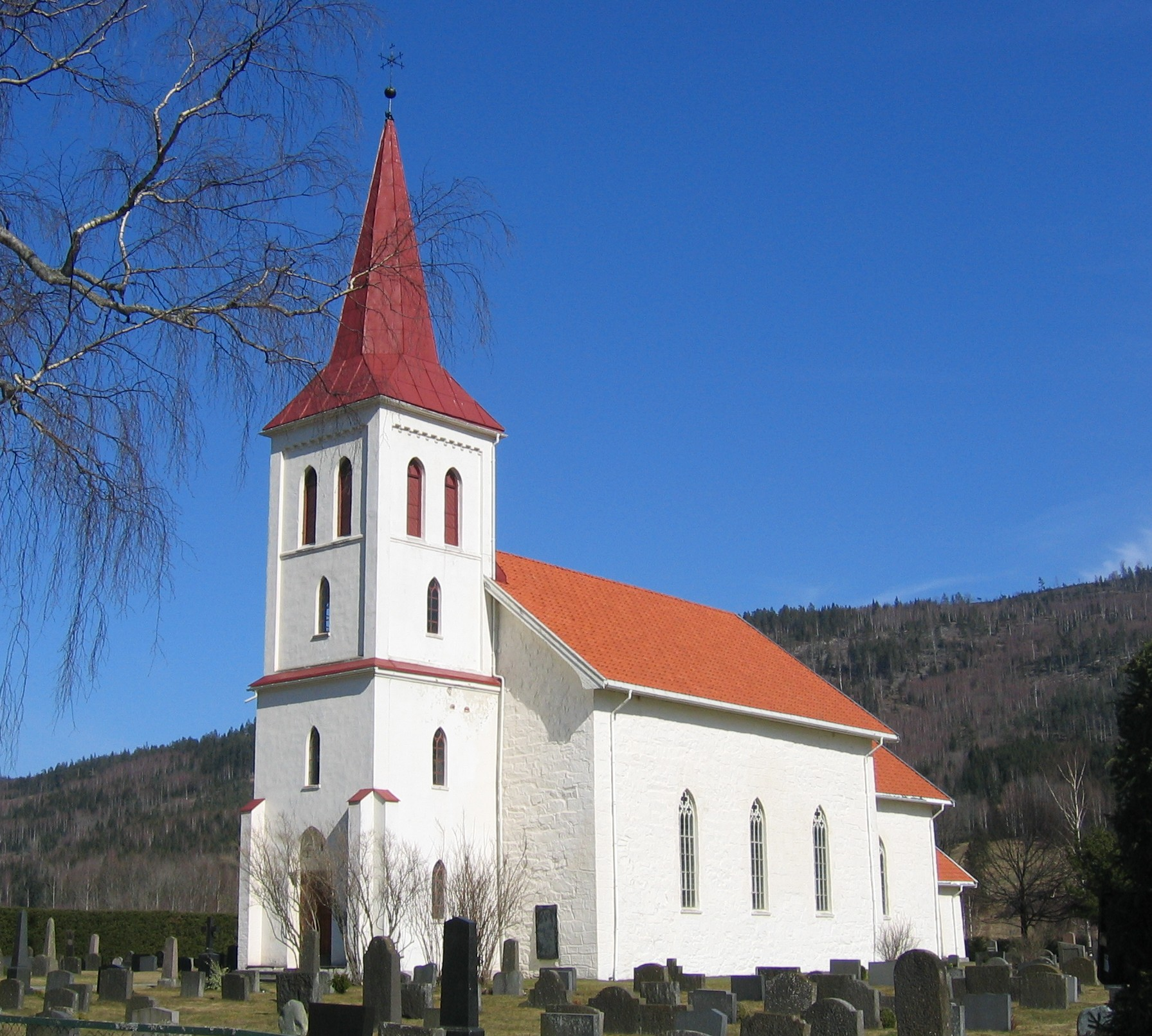
- View of the church
- Efteløt Church
- 59°33′02″N 9°48′35″E
- Location: Kongsberg Municipality, Buskerud
- Country: Norway
- Denomination: Church of Norway
- Previous denomination: Catholic Church
- Churchmanship: Evangelical Lutheran

History
- Status: Parish church
- Founded: c. 1184
- Consecrated: c. 1184

Architecture
- Functional status: Active
- Architectural type: Long church
- Completed: c. 1184 (842 years ago)

Specifications
- Capacity: 190
- Materials: Stone

Administration
- Diocese: Tunsberg
- Deanery: Kongsberg prosti
- Parish: Efteløt
- Norwegian Cultural Heritage Site
- Type: Church
- Status: Automatically protected
- ID: 84051

Efteløt Church (Norwegian: Efteløt kirke) is a parish church of the Church of Norway in Kongsberg Municipality in Buskerud county, Norway. It is located in the village of Efteløt. It is the church for the Efteløt parish which is part of the Kongsberg prosti (deanery) in the Diocese of Tunsberg. The white, stone church was built in a long church design around the year 1184. The church seats about 190 people.

== History ==
The earliest existing historical records of the church date back to the year 1395, but the church was not built that year. The church's nave and choir are made of stone and are believed to have been built towards the end of the 12th century. The church was dedicated to John the Baptist and the Virgin Mary. The Romanesque stone church features a rectangular nave and a narrower, rectangular chancel with an internal apse (although the exterior walls were rectangular).

In 1814, this church served as an election church (Norwegian: valgkirke). Together with more than 300 other parish churches across Norway, it was a polling station for elections to the 1814 Norwegian Constituent Assembly which wrote the Constitution of Norway. This was Norway's first national election. Each church parish was a constituency that elected people called "electors" who later met together in each county to elect the representatives for the assembly that was to meet at Eidsvoll Manor later that year.

The church, like most other churches in Norway, was sold into private ownership during the Norwegian church sale in 1723 to help the King pay off war debts. The municipality took over ownership of the building in 1873 and then initiated a number of restorations with somewhat varying results. It began with a major reconstruction in 1876. The church was given a west tower with a brick church porch and a sacristy made of quarry stone in the east. The choir was and is straight-ended on the outside, but apsidal on the inside, and a door was made in the east wall that partially overlapped an earlier window (the rest of the window was bricked up again). The nave was given an extra window in the south wall, and the windows were made pointed arched in accordance with the taste of the time. The chancel arch and the nave's west portal were expanded. The church got new roofs with a gentler slope than before (the gables were made somewhat lower). The old stone altar was used as a stepping stone, as was an old gravestone. The floor in the nave was raised by about 90 centimetres (35 in) compared to before, and now the choir's floor is three steps higher than that of the nave.

In 1905, repairs were made to the church, and in 1906 the stone wall that surrounded it was turned into rubble and used in a road construction. In 1953, the church underwent an extensive restoration according to plans by Ragnar Nilsen. The north gallery from 1876 was removed, and the west gallery was given a new parapet. Frescoes were uncovered in the choir and nave.

== See also ==
- List of churches in Tunsberg
