= Kirke og Kultur =

Norwegian cultural magazine

- Editor: Inge Lønning (1968-2013)
- Categories: Cultural magazine
- Frequency: Monthly
- Publisher: Universitetsforlaget
- Founded: 1894; 131 years ago
- Country: Norway
- Based in: Oslo
- Language: Norwegian
- ISSN: 0023-186X
- OCLC: 466923221

Kirke og Kultur (Norwegian: Church and Culture) is a Norwegian language monthly cultural and clerical magazine published in Oslo, Norway. It has been in circulation since 1894.

== History and profile ==
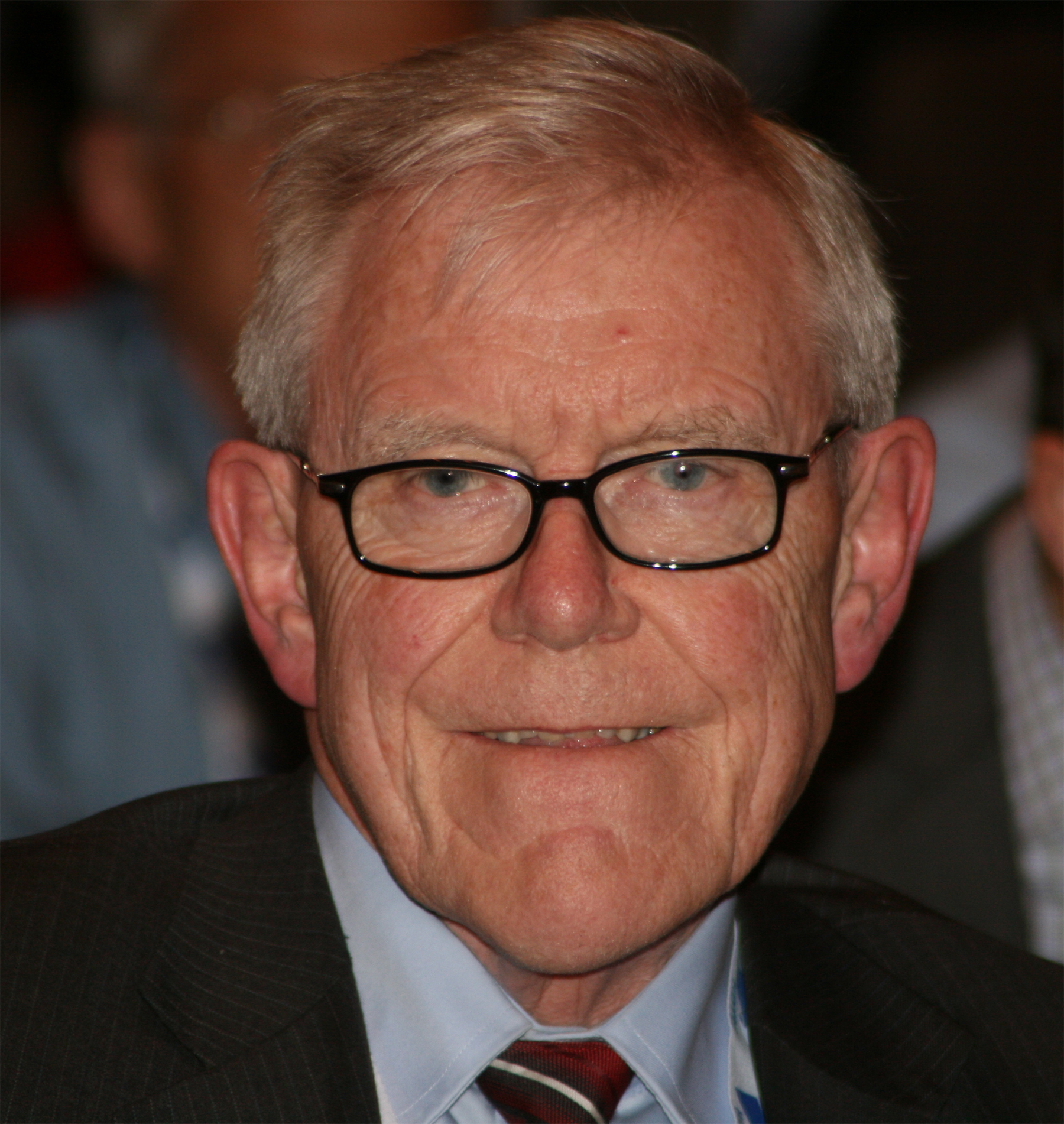
Inge Lønning, editor from 1968 until his death in 2013.

Kirke og Kultur was founded in 1894 by Christopher Bruun and Thorvald Klaveness, originally named For Kirke og Kultur. The magazine has its headquarters in Oslo and is published on a monthly basis.

Early contributors of Kirke og Kultur included Søren Kierkegaard. Sverre Hov, a Norwegian poet, was a regular contributor to the magazine between 1937 and 1993. From 1968 the magazine was edited by Inge Lønning, with Kjetil Hafstad as co-editor from 1994.

In November 1940 Ronald Fangen became the first Norwegian writer to be arrested by the German occupants of Norway due to an essay published in the periodical Kirke og Kultur.

Kirke og Kultur covers articles and commentaries on religion- and church-related topics as well as on literary work and social issues.
