= Per Arne Dahl =

Biography

The Right Reverend Per Arne Dahl
- Bishop of Tunsberg
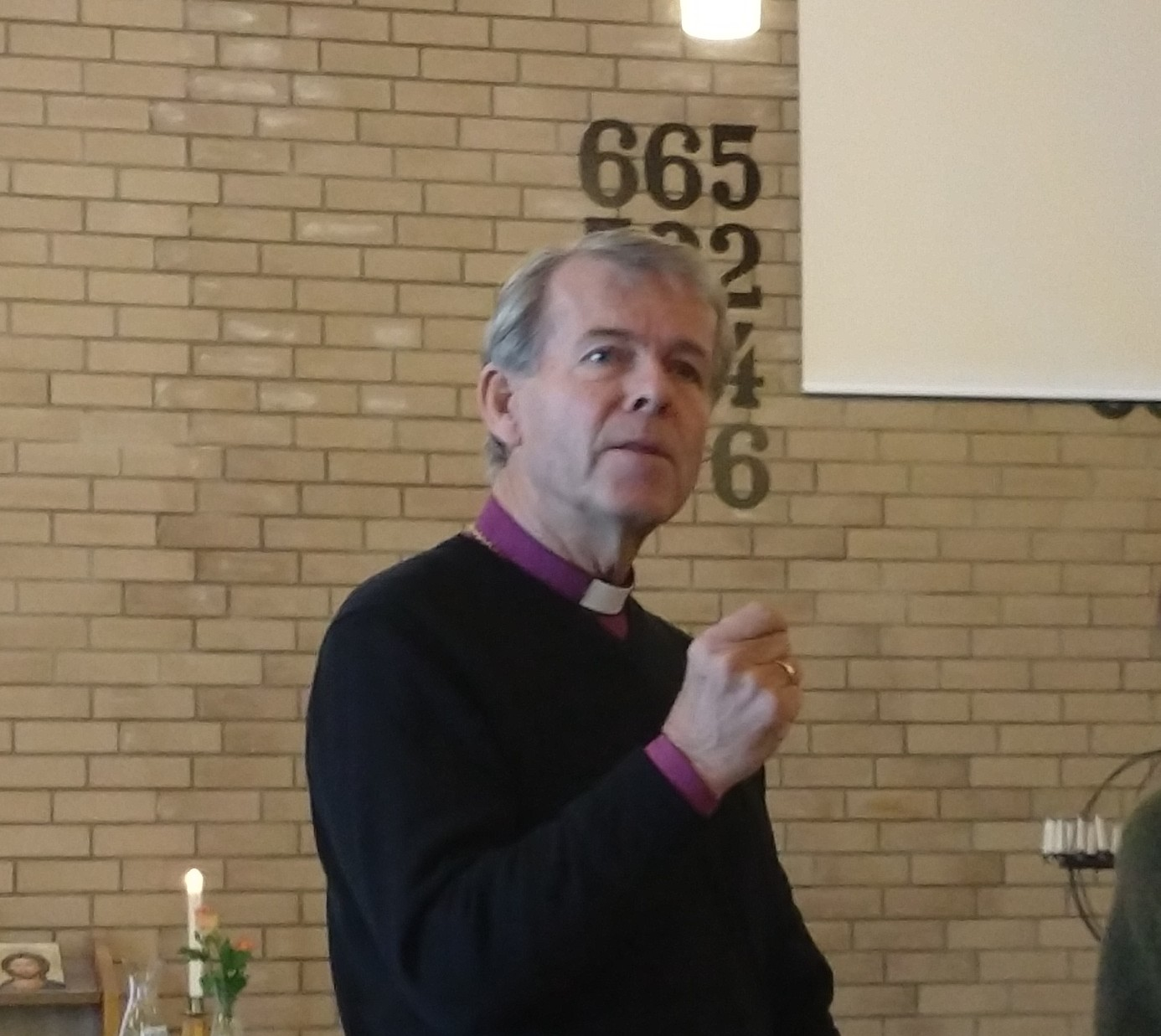
- Church: Church of Norway
- Diocese: Tunsberg
- Elected: 2014
- In office: 2014–2018
- Predecessor: Laila Riksaasen Dahl
- Successor: Jan Otto Myrseth

Orders
- Consecration: 21 September 2014

Personal details
- Born: 18 August 1950 (age 75) Sarpsborg, Norway
- Denomination: Lutheran

Per Arne Dahl (born 18 August 1950 in Sarpsborg) is a Norwegian author and former Bishop of Tunsberg.

== Biography ==
He grew up in Gjøvik, Vålerenga in Oslo, and Kolbotn. Dahl is also known for a long-standing commitment as a columnist in Aftenposten together with the artist Ulf Aas. In 2003 he was appointed government scholar with effect from 2004. At the announcement, it was emphasized that with his versatile work he contributed "to the diminishing of boundaries in communication between church and people".

Dahl declared his nomination for the Oslo and Borg Bishoprics in 2005, respectively. He once again was a candidate, this time for the bishop of the Diocese of Tunsberg to which he was elected on 12 March 2014 to succeed Laila Riksaasen Dahl, and was consecrated bishop on September 21, 2014.
