= Dagfinn Hauge =

Norwegian writer and Lutheran Bishop

Bishop Dagfinn Hauge
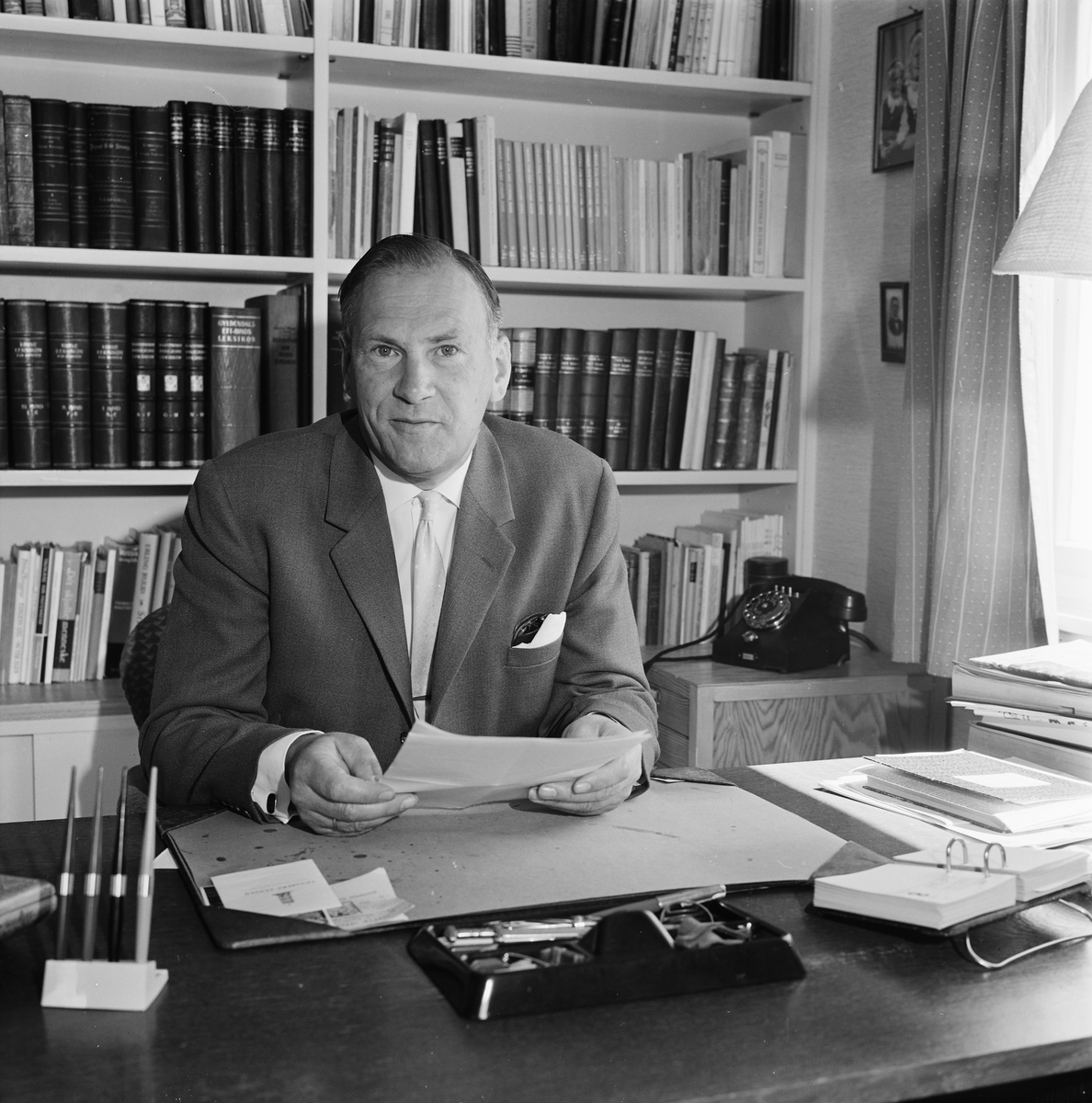

Personal details
- Born: 14 July 1908 Bergen, Norway
- Died: 14 March 2007 (aged 98)
- Denomination: Lutheran
- Parents: David Hauge; Kari Bremer
- Spouse: Lulli Tvedt (1906-1997)
- Occupation: Priest
- Education: University of Oslo

Dagfinn Hauge (14 July 1908 – 14 March 2007) was a Norwegian writer and Lutheran Bishop in the Church of Norway. During the German occupation of Norway he served as priest at the Akershus Prison, where prisoners with death sentence spent their last days before execution.

== Biography ==
Hauge grew up in Bergen, Norway. He was the son of David Hauge (1876-1926) and Kari Bremer (1880-1979). In 1927 he went to the University of Oslo to study theology at the Faculty of Law and graduated in 1932. In 1938, Hauge was a parish priest at Lilleborg neighborhood of Oslo. Hauge was known for his work during World War II, when in 1941 he was asked to serve at the prison at Akershus Fortress in Oslo. He worked at Akershus for the duration of the war, and ministered to a number of prisoners who were sentenced to death during the German occupation of Norway. After the end of the war and of the German occupation of Norway, Hauge wrote a book in which he described his experiences ministering to condemned prisoners (Slik dør menn; 1946).

Hauge was briefly a member of Oslo City Council. He was a board member of the Luther Foundation (Norwegian: Lutherstiftelsen) (1945–1961). From 1946-60, he served as chairman of the board of Diakonissehuset in Oslo (now Lovisenberg Diakonale Sykehus). Hauge was also secretary general of the Norwegian Christian Youth League (1948–1954). He served as editor of Luthersk Kirketidende, published by Luther Foundation (1954–1962). Hauge was a minister at Vestre Aker in Oslo from 1959 to 1962. He then served as the bishop of the Diocese of Tunsberg from 1962 to 1978.

== Selected works ==
- Lilleborg menighet 25 år (1942)
- Bønnens mulighet (1944)
- Slik dør menn (1946)
- Visitas på bedehuset (1966)
- Lokalmenighetenes organisasjonsform (1973)
- Fortolkning til første og annen Samuels bok (1973)
- Menighet i vekst (1977)
- Tiden i Tunsberg (1983)
- 100 år med ungdom i Larvik (1987)
- Prestetjeneste på Akershus under krigen (2001)

== Related reading ==
- Arne Hassing (2014) Church Resistance to Nazism in Norway, 1940-1945 (University of Washington Press)ISBN 9780295804798

Church of Norway
Preceded by Bjarne Skard	Bishop of Tunsberg; 1962–1978	Succeeded by Håkon E. Andersen
