= Håkon E. Andersen =

Norwegian bishop

Håkon Edvard Andersen (14 April 1925 – 9 December 2012) was a Norwegian bishop.

He was born in Stavanger and took the cand.theol. degree in 1949 at the MF Norwegian School of Theology. He was the secretary-general of the Norwegian Lutheran Inner Mission Society from 1966 to 1975, then dean in Jæren. After three years there, he served as bishop of the Diocese of Tunsberg from 1978 to 1990. He chaired Organisasjonenes Fellesråd and Luther Forlag.

Church of Norway titles
Preceded by Dagfinn Hauge	Bishop of Tunsberg; 1978–1990	Succeeded by Sigurd Osberg
