= Laila Riksaasen Dahl =

Norwegian theologian

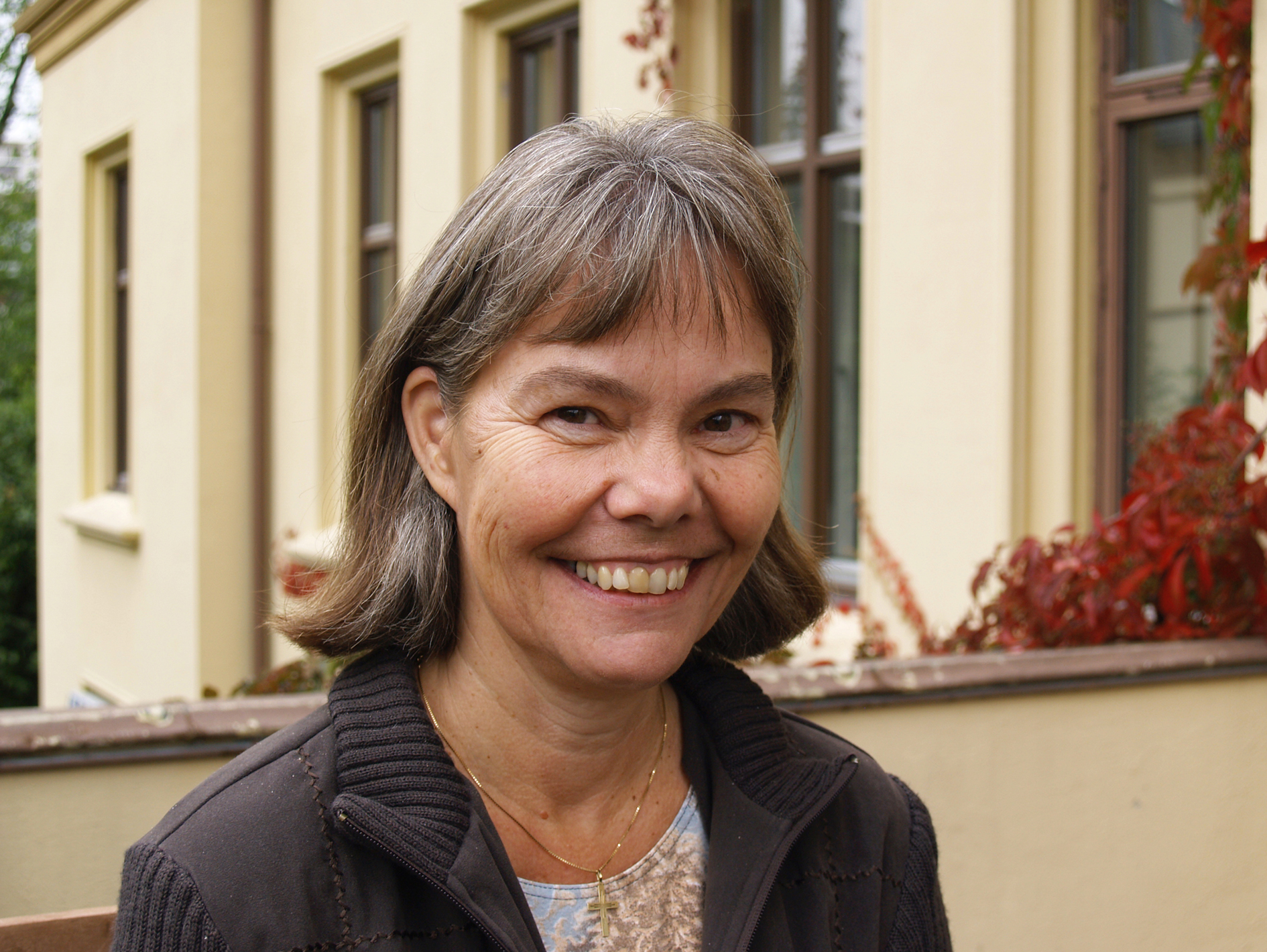
Laila Riksaasen Dahl Photo: Kirkens informasjonstjeneste

Laila Riksaasen Dahl (born 7 March 1947, in Oslo) is a Norwegian theologian who served as bishop of the Diocese of Tunsberg in the Church of Norway from 2002 to 2014.

Dahl is a graduate from both the University of Oslo (1970, cand.mag. degree) and MF Norwegian School of Theology (1990, cand.theol. degree). Dahl worked as a teacher from 1970 to 1980, and as a Christian educator (cathecist) from 1980 to 1984. She held teaching positions at the MF Norwegian School of Theology, as assistant professor from 1984 and associate professor from 1990 to 1995 in the field of Christian education.

From 1995 to 2002, Dahl was a parish priest in Nittedal. She was consecrated as a bishop on 9 February 2003 — the second woman in the history of Norway. She retired in 2014. Her successor was Per Arne Dahl.

Church of Norway titles
Preceded by Sigurd Osberg	Bishop of Tunsberg; 2002–2014	Succeeded by Per Arne Dahl
