= Ustedalen Chapel =

Church in Buskerud, Norway

- Ustedalen kapell
- View of the church
- Ustedalen Chapel
- 60°32′07″N 8°12′38″E
- Location: Hol, Buskerud
- Country: Norway
- Denomination: Church of Norway
- Churchmanship: Evangelical Lutheran

History
- Former name: Geilo kirke
- Status: Parish church
- Founded: 1890
- Consecrated: 4 June 1890

Architecture
- Functional status: Active
- Architect: Jacob Wilhelm Nordan
- Architectural type: Long church
- Completed: 1890 (136 years ago)

Specifications
- Capacity: 190
- Materials: Wood

Administration
- Diocese: Tunsberg
- Deanery: Hallingdal prosti
- Parish: Geilo
- Norwegian Cultural Heritage Site
- Type: Church
- Status: Not protected
- ID: 85731

Ustedalen Chapel (Norwegian: Ustedalen kapell) is a parish church of the Church of Norway in Hol Municipality in Buskerud county, Norway. It is located in the village of Geilo. It is one of the churches for the Geilo parish which is part of the Hallingdal prosti (deanery) in the Diocese of Tunsberg. The white, wooden church was built in a long church design in 1890 using plans drawn up by the architect Jacob Wilhelm Nordan. The church seats about 190 people.

The church was originally known as Ustedalen Chapel before changing its name to Geilo Church in 1988. After the new Geilo Culture Church was opened in 2010, it regained its original name, Ustedalen Chapel.

== History ==
Plans for a new church in Geilo were prepared by Jacob Wilhelm Nordan in 1886. Permission for construction was granted the following year. The new Ustedalen Chapel was built by builder Ole Olssøn Sollie from Torpo and it was consecrated on 4 June 1890. It is a wooden long church. The nave is rectangular and has a gable in the west. In the east, there is a narrower, rectangular choir surrounded by sacristies. In 1958–1960 it was expanded westwards with a larger church porch that was designed by Leiv Tvilde. At the same time, it was given today's interior colors. In 2010, the new Geilo Culture Church was opened and it replaced this chapel as the main church for the parish.

== Media gallery ==
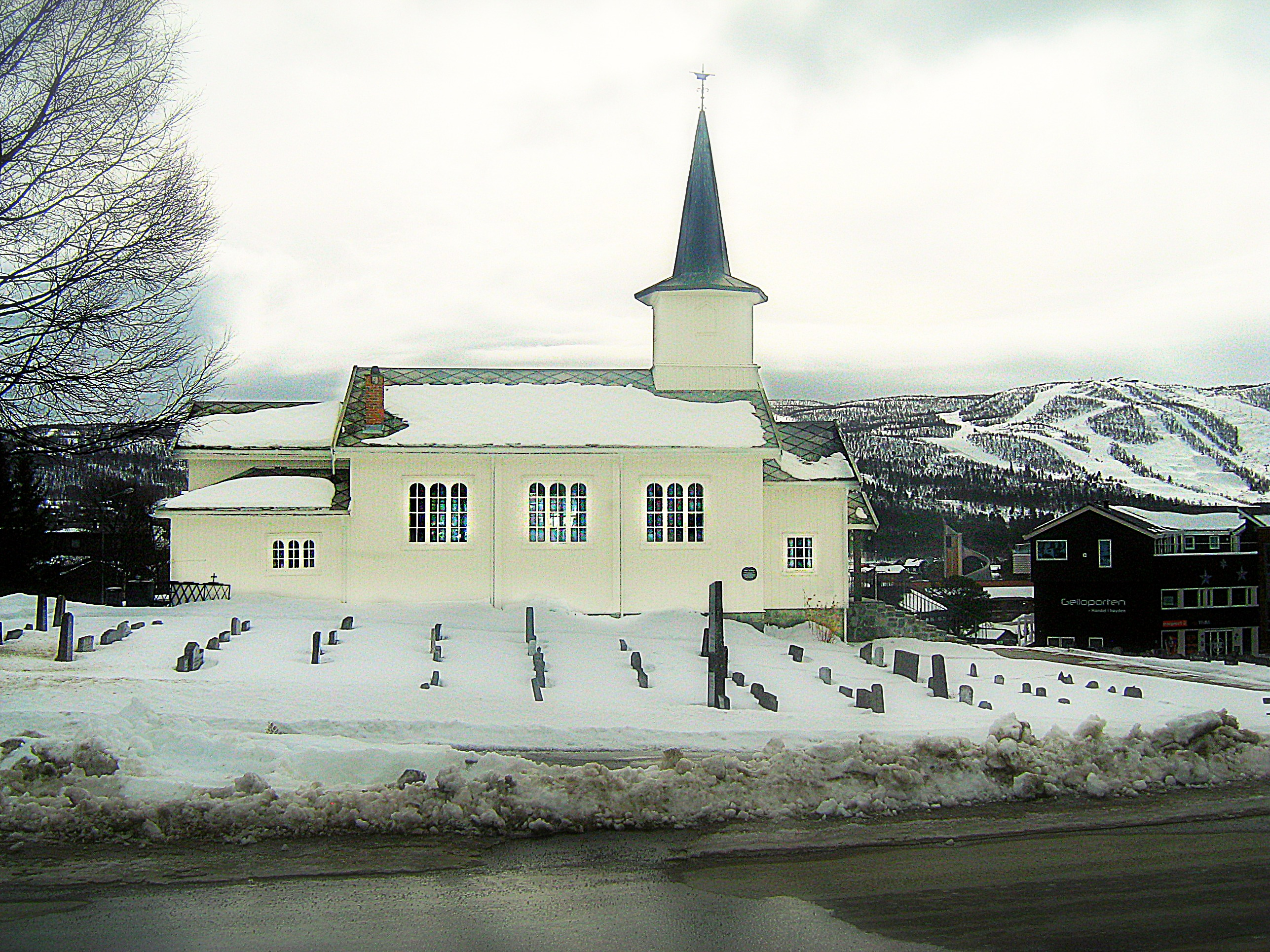

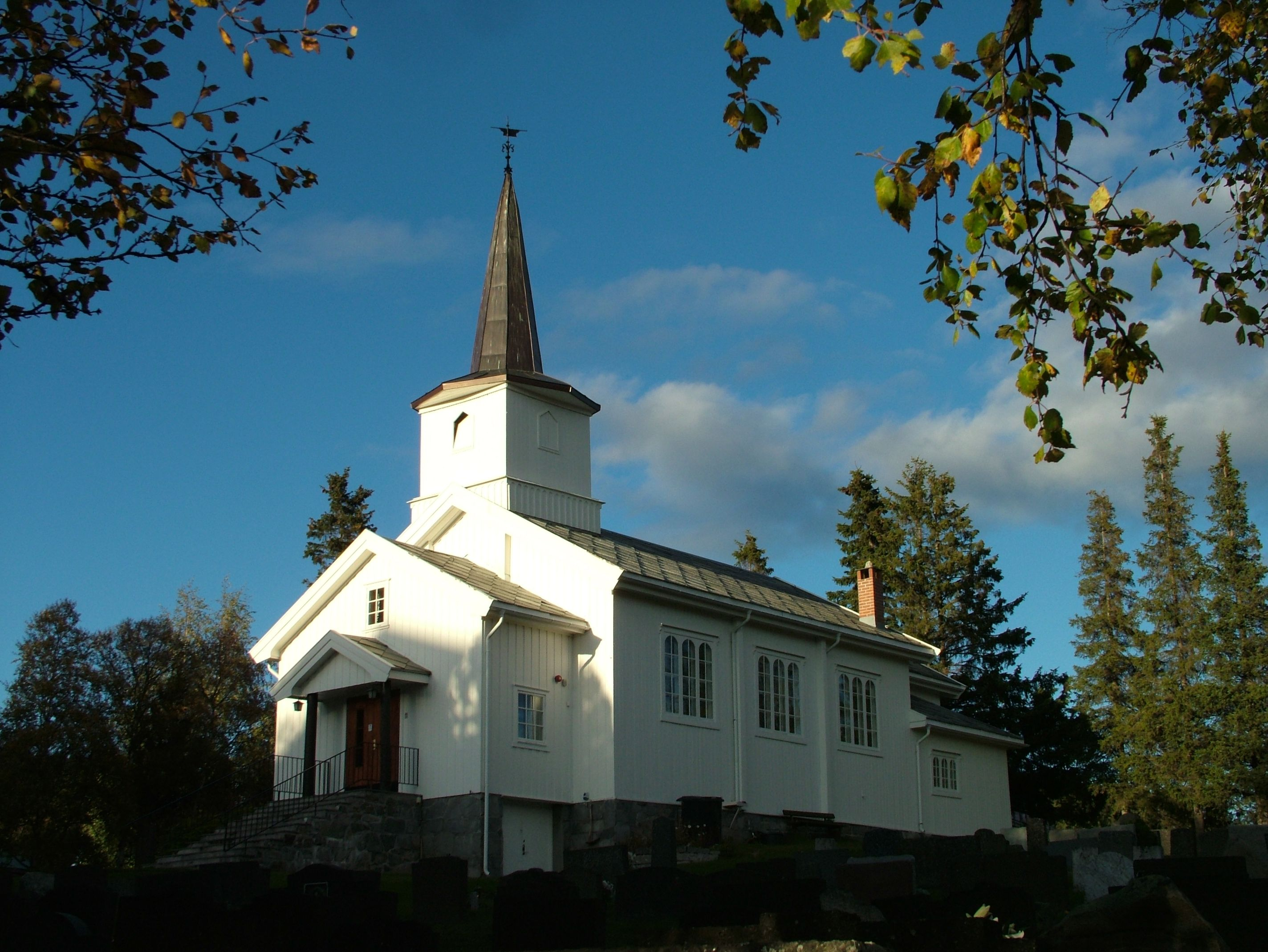

== See also ==
- List of churches in Tunsberg
