= Matias Skard =

Norwegian philologist, educator, psalmist, essayist and translator (1846–1927)

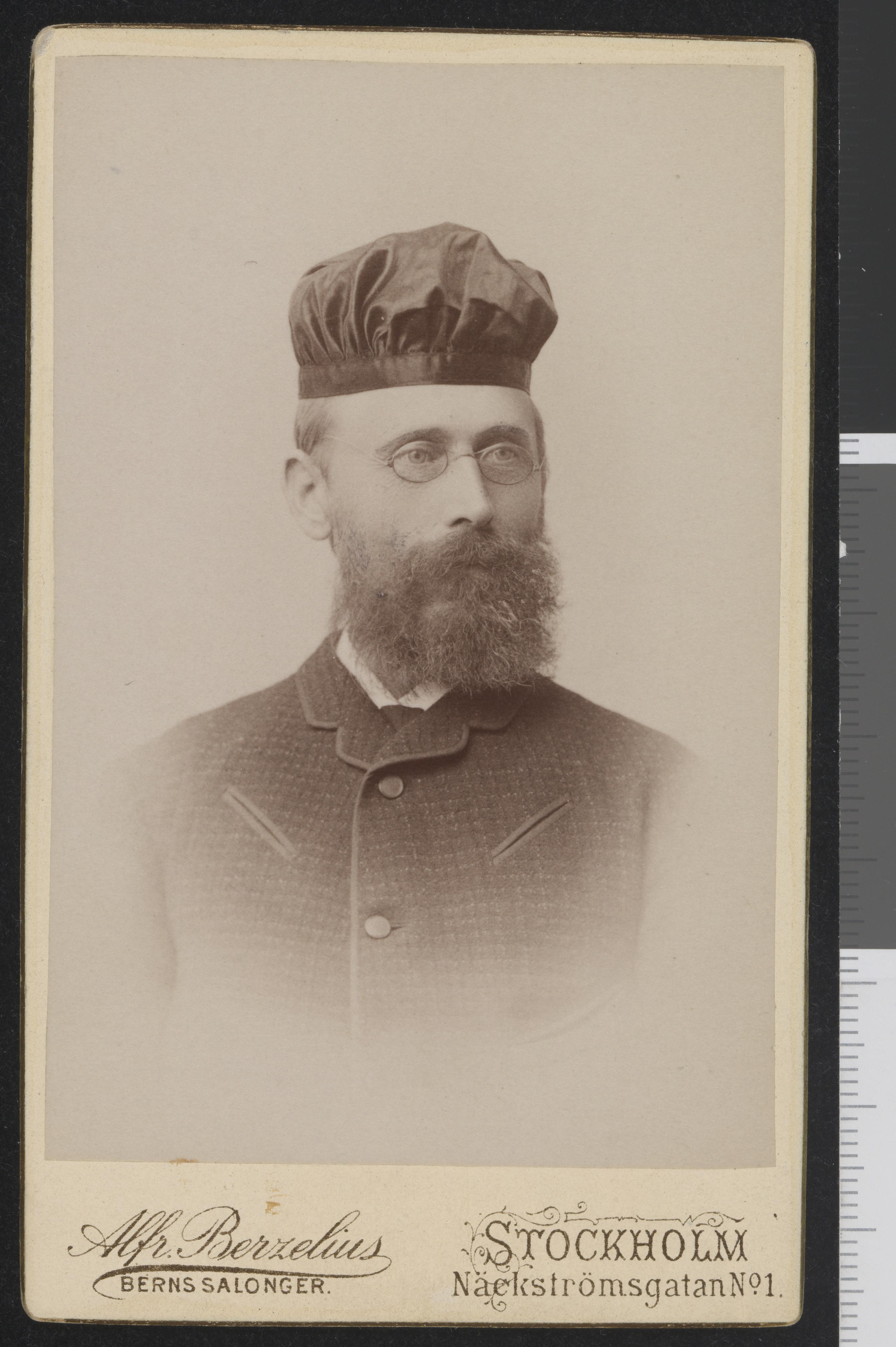
- Born: 28 May 1846
- Died: 28 July 1927 (aged 81)
- Spouse(s): Gyda Benedikte Skard
- Children: Sigmund Skard, Vemund Skard

Matias Skard (28 May 1846 – 28 July 1927) was a Norwegian philologist, educator, psalmist, essayist and translator.

== Biography ==
Matias Olsen Skard was born on a family farm in Øyer Municipality in Gudbrandsdal, Norway. He had planned to study theology but rather began his career as a teacher. He taught at the Latin School in Lillehammer from 1864 to 1868 and at Folk High Schools in Nordre Trondheim county from 1877 to 1881. He chaired the Vonheim Folk High School founded by Christopher Bruun in Østre Gausdal Municipality from 1884 to 1890. From 1886 to 1890, he was also co-editor of the newspaper Framgang. He taught at the Teacher's College in Levanger from 1892 to 1901. In 1901, he was appointed school director in Kristiansand, a position he retained until he retired in 1921.

During the 1880s, Skard was in a task group charged with translating the New Testament into the Norwegian language. His brief Nynorsk dictionary Nynorsk ordbok for rettskriving og literaturlesnad, which was published by Aschehoug in 1912, proved popular and has been a basis for several later editions.

== Personal life ==
Matias Skard was married three times. He was the father of horticulturists Olav Skard and Torfinn Skard, professor Sigmund Skard, classical philologist Eiliv Skard, and Bishop Bjarne Skard.

== See also ==
- Norsk Ordbok (Nynorsk)
