= Hvittingfoss =

Village in Kongsberg Municipality, Norway

- Village
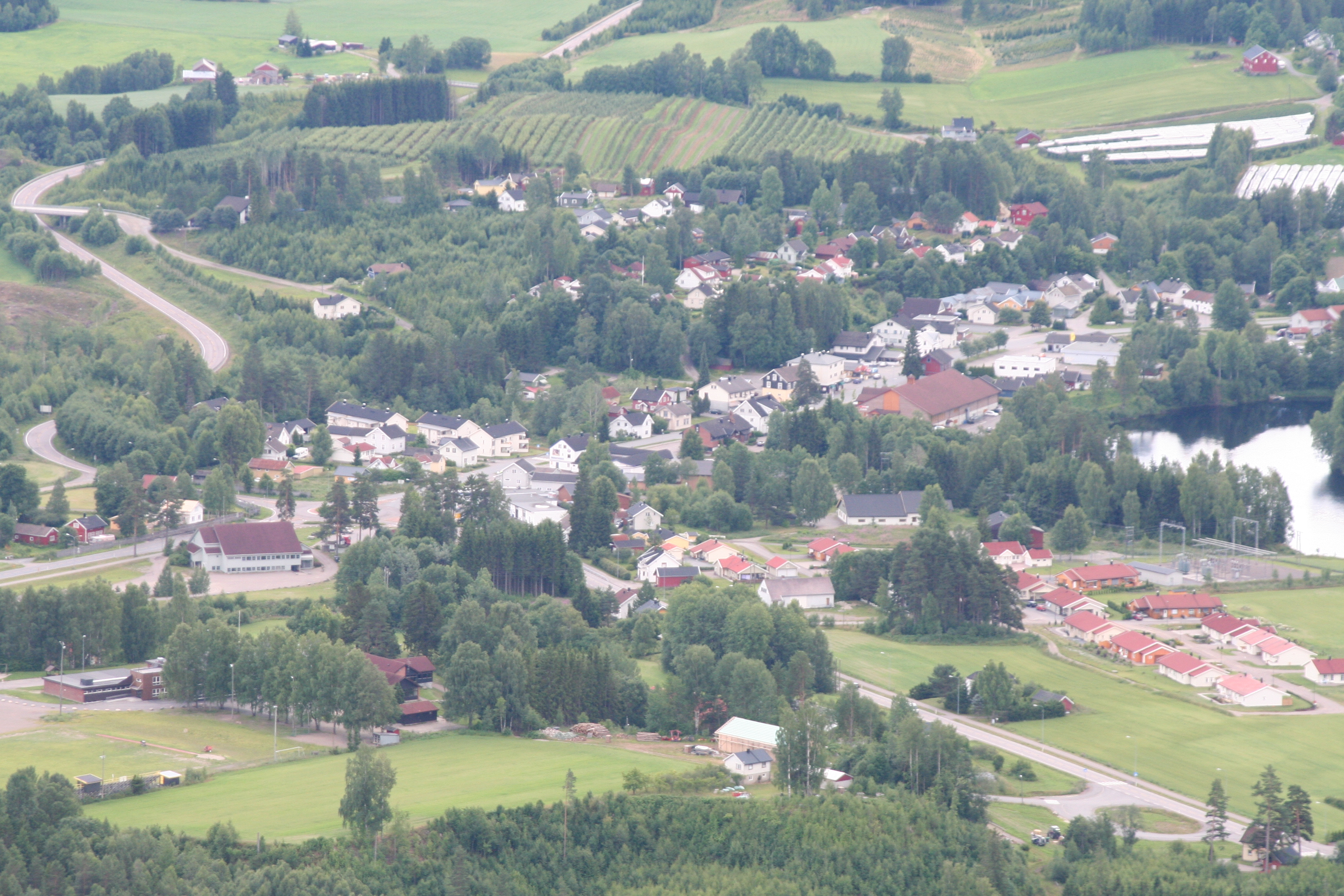
- View of the village
- Interactive map of Hvittingfoss
- Coordinates: 59.48572°N 10.01173°E
- Country: Norway
- Region: Eastern Norway
- County: Buskerud
- District: Lower Buskerud
- Municipality: Kongsberg Municipality

Area
  - Total: 1.15 km^{2} (0.44 sq mi)
- Elevation: 76 m (249 ft)

Population (2026)
  - Total: 1,122
  - Density: 976/km^{2} (2,530/sq mi)
- Time zone: UTC+01:00 (CET)
  - Summer (DST): UTC+02:00 (CEST)
- Post Code: 3647 Hvittingfoss

Hvittingfoss is a village in Kongsberg Municipality in Buskerud county, Norway. The village is located along the Numedalslågen river, just west of the border with Holmestrand Municipality in Vestfold county and just north of the border with Larvik Municipality, also in Vestfold county. Hvittingfoss has traditionally been associated with the manufacture of pulp, paper, and paper products.

Hvittingfoss is located about 30 kilometres (19 mi) from the town of Kongsberg. The 1.15-square-kilometre (280-acre) village has a population (2026) of 1,122 and a population density of 976 inhabitants per square kilometre (2,530/sq mi).

== History ==
Prior to the municipal merger in 1964, Hvittingfoss was part of the old Ytre Sandsvær Municipality.

Industrial development was driven by the waterfalls of Hvittingfoss as far back as the 17th century. In 1651, there were reportedly five sawmills in the northern waterfall, called Nord-fossen. The royal privileges of Vittingfossen was given to the counts in Jarlsberg and Larvik. Industrialist Christian August Anker (1840–1912) developed Hønefoss Træsliberi which started its production of wood pulp in 1881.

The pulp and paper group Edward Lloyd Limited, owner of Lloyd's Illustrated London Newspaper and the Daily Chronicle in London, operated huge paper mills in Kemsley, England. The firm bought Hønefoss Træsliberi in 1902 in order to obtain a ready supply of wood pulp. In 1906, the Lloyd company builta paper mill on Hvittingfoss with a capacity of approximately 2,000 tonnes (2,000 long tons; 2,200 short tons) press of thin paper for the Asian market. In 1916, the Lloyd firm sold all plants and waterfalls rights to a consortium led by a Captain Hjalmar Johansen. The Lloyd interests reserved the right to lease and operate the plants for 14 years. In 1932 the Lloyd company completed its business on Hvittingfoss after 30 years of operation.

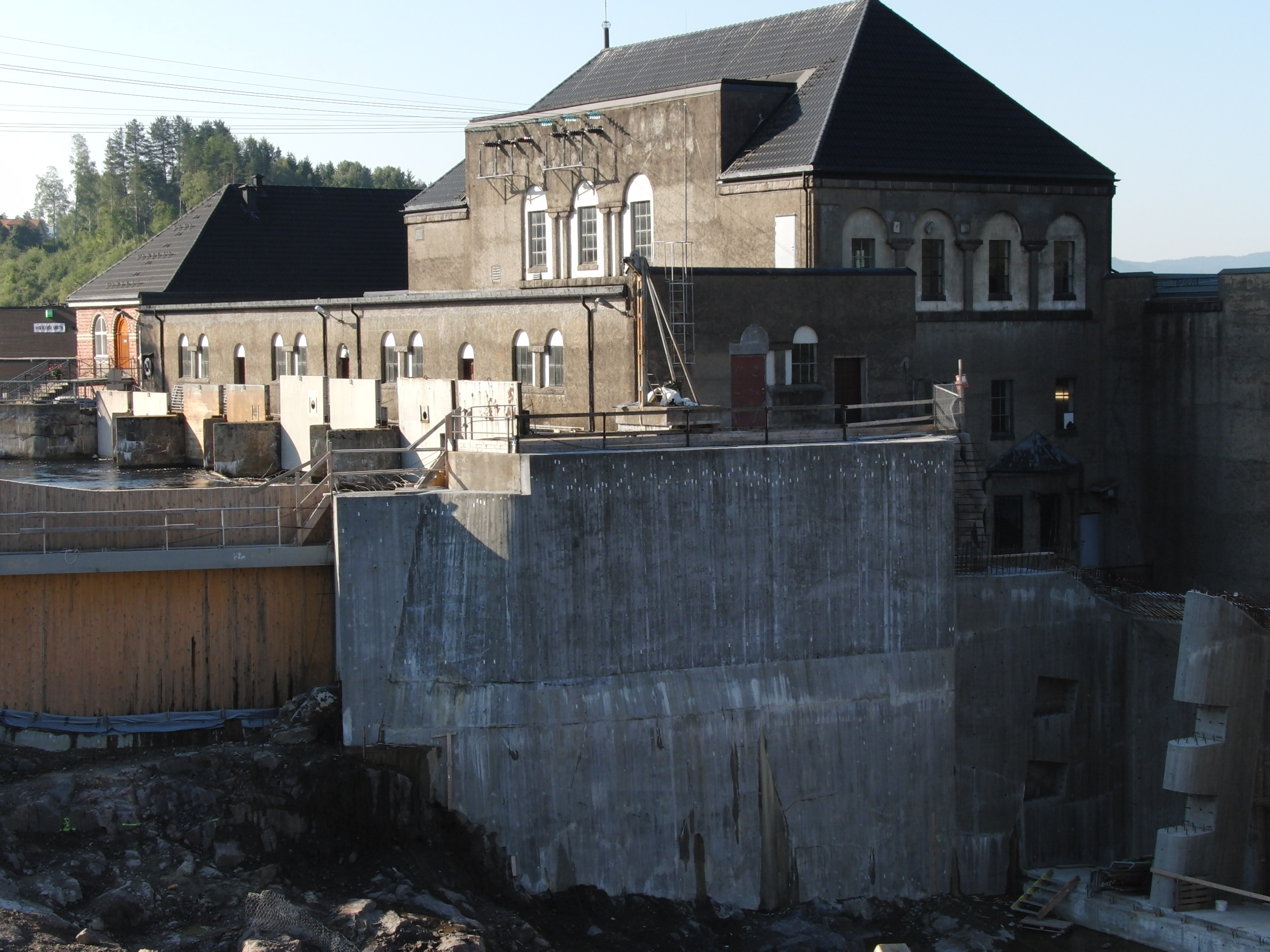
Vittingfoss kraftverk

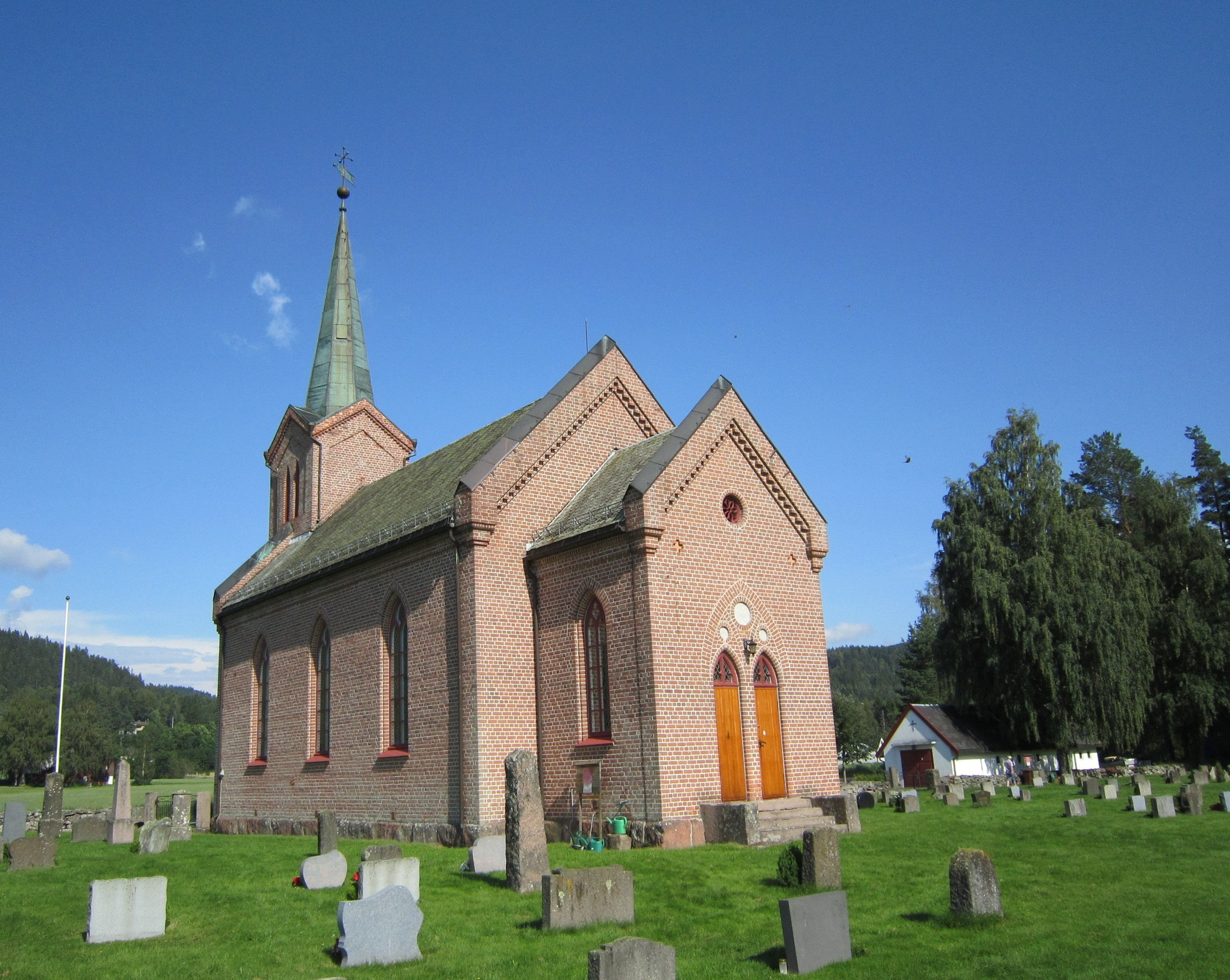
Tuft Church

== Vittingfoss power plant ==
Vittingfoss power plant (Vittingfoss kraftverk) is located on the Numedalslågen just off the center of Hvittingfoss. The power plant was a built in conjunction with a dam in 1910. The plant has five units, four with vertical Francis turbines, and one with a Kaplan turbine; the two eldest of approximately 4.5 megawatts (6,000 hp) each were put into operation in 1919 and 1920, the third 4.8-megawatt (6,400 hp) turbine in 1949, the fourth 6.8-megawatt (9,100 hp) turbine in 1981 and the fifth 14.5-megawatt (19,400 hp) in 2014.

== Tuft Church ==
Tuft Church is located just outside Hvittingfoss. The present church was erected in 1880. The edifice is made of brick and has 150 seats. It was constructed as a replacement an older wooden stave church which was originally built in the 1200s.
