= Johannes Skar =

Norwegian educator and folklorist

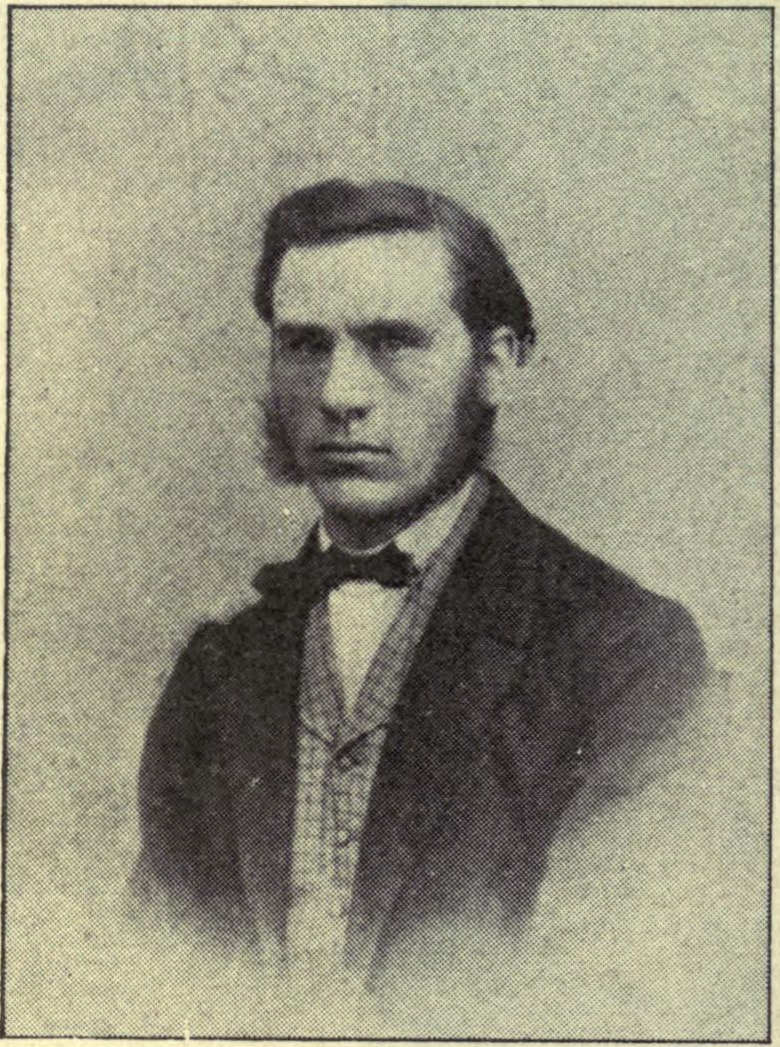
- Born: 18 November 1837; Øyer Municipality, Norway
- Died: 3 February 1914 (aged 76); Bygland Municipality, Norway
- Education: Royal Frederick University
- Occupation: folklorist
- Relatives: Matias Skard (brother)

Johannes Skar (18 November 1837 – 3 February 1914) was a Norwegian educator and folklorist.

== Biography ==
Skar was born at Øyer Municipality in Oppland county, Norway. He was the son of Ole Torsteinsson Skar (1802-1886) and Mari Johannesdotter Lånke (1814-1894). His brother was educator Matias Skard (1846–1927).

He was raised in the traditional region of Gudbrandsdalen and attended the Latin School in Lillehammer (Lillehammer latinskole). He later studied at the University of Christiania where he took his degree in 1860. As an educator, he first worked as a children's tutor. From 1883 to 1892, he taught at Bruuns Folk School (Bruuns folkehøgskule) in Sel Municipality and also in Gausdal Municipality. The school was operated by his brother-in-law, folk school pioneer Christopher Bruun (1839-1920).

Skar collected folklore throughout his adult life. These works include legends, fairy tales, proverbs, riddles, nursery rhymes and songs. In 1881, on the initiative of Jørgen Moe (1813-1882) and Jørgen Løvland (1848-1922), he received a private grant from citizens in Kristiansand to continue his collection efforts. The following year he received a scholarship from the University of Christiania. In 1897 at age 59, he was granted a state scholarship which provided financial support for the remainder of his life. He then moved back to Setesdal.

In 1876, he published a book which contains information about life and folklore in Gudbrandsdalen. Olaf Norli (1861-1959) was the publisher for the main body of his work. His main contribution to Norwegian literature is the work Gamalt or Sætesdal (1903-1916), a collection of eight volumes of the old peasant culture in the valley of Setesdal. These are works of cultural history with a prominent portion about the older folk culture in Setesdal built on the valley's pastoral past. Two volumes were published after his death.

He died in Bygland Municipality in Aust-Agder during 1914. He was buried in the cemetery of Årdal Church at Grendi in Bygland. A bust of Johannes Skar was designed by sculptor Dyre Vaa (1903–1980) and cast in bronze. It was erected in the churchyard of Årdal Church in 1924.

== Other sources ==
- Olav Bø (1953) Johannes Skar, Gudbrandsdølen som skapte Gamalt or Saetesdal (Oslo: Olaf Norli)
