= Christopher Bruun =

Norwegian priest and educator

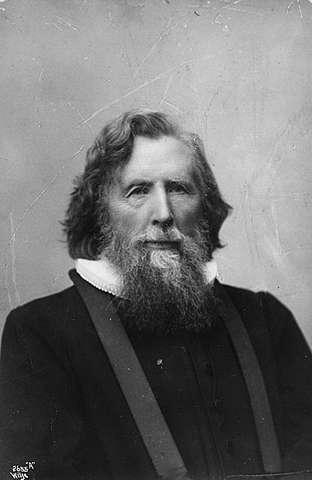
Christopher Bruun

Christopher Arndt Bruun (23 September 1839 – 17 July 1920) was a Norwegian priest and educator.

== Biography ==
He was born in Kristiania (now Oslo), Norway. He was a son of jurist Johan Peter Bruun (1810–1843) and Line Stenersen (1816–1901). After his father died when Christopher was three years old, the family moved to Vang Municipality in Hedmark and then to Lillehammer Municipality in 1850. He enrolled in theology studies at the Royal Frederick University in 1857, and graduated with the cand.theol. degree in 1862.

He was an open Scandinavist, and in 1864 he returned to Norway from a trip in Rome to agitate for Norwegian support of the Danish cause in the Second Schleswig War. He even participated as a volunteer in the Battle of Dybbøl in April 1864, and after being demobilized from the war in August 1864, he walked back to Rome.

Later, especially around 1866 and 1867, Bruun began supporting the use of the language form Landsmål (now Nynorsk), and was also inspired by N. F. S. Grundtvig and the Danish folk high school movement. He founded a folk school in Sel Municipality in Gudbrandsdalen during 1867. It was moved to Fykse in Gausdal Municipality in Oppland during 1871 and to Vonheim (also in Gausdal Municipality) during 1874. In the same year Karoline and Bjørnstjerne Bjørnson moved to Aulestad, which is located nearby. Gausdal became a cultural centre, although Bjørnson later split with this milieu.

Bruun's thoughts on education were chiseled out in the work Folkelige Grundtanker issued in 1878.He idealized Norwegian history, and wanted to replace Greek and Latin languages with the Old Norse Edda in schools. At the same time as hailing the Norwegian farmer, he was clear that the farming populace would need to be educated, especially over the next "century", hence the folk high schools. As a theologian he denounced Pietism, and emphasized the collective (the people) over the individual. He also (unlike Grundtvig) preferred a Free Church over a State Church. Nonetheless, he left Vonheim Folk School to become curate in Kristiania in 1893. He was promoted to vicar at Johannes Church (Johannes kirke) in 1898.

He supported the Liberal Party, later the Moderate Liberal Party, but did not fit in here, neither with Johan Sverdrup's constitutional policies nor the Lars Oftedal and Western Norway- dominated Moderate Liberal Party. From 1884 to 1888, during a most turbulent period in Norwegian political history, Bruun issued the periodical For frisindet Christendom. In 1893 he co-founded the periodical For kirke og kultur, and co-edited it until 1908. In 1905 he chose not to support the radical constitutional policies that led to the dissolution of the union between Norway and Sweden. His periodical refused to print his views on the union dissolution. A pamphlet was printed in Denmark and smuggled to Norway. This contributed to him being removed from For kirke og kultur in 1908.

== Personal life ==
In 1872 Christopher Bruun married Kari Skard (1851-1924). Her parents were Ole Torsteinson Skard (1804-1886) and Mari Johannesdotter Lånke (1814-1894). She had eight siblings including brothers, Johannes Skar (1837–1914) and Matias Skard (1846–1927).

Christopher and Kari Bruun were the parents of eight children. Five died of tuberculosis at a young age. Their daughter Margit Bruun (1875–1958) married Klaus Sletten (1877–1946) in 1905 and was the mother of Vegard Sletten. Bruun retired as vicar in 1918, and retreated to Østre Gausdal Municipality where he died on his farm in July 1920. His wife died in May 1924. They were buried in the family grave at Vår Frelsers gravlund in Oslo.
