= Tønsberg =

Tønsberg Tunsberg (historic name)
- Town/City
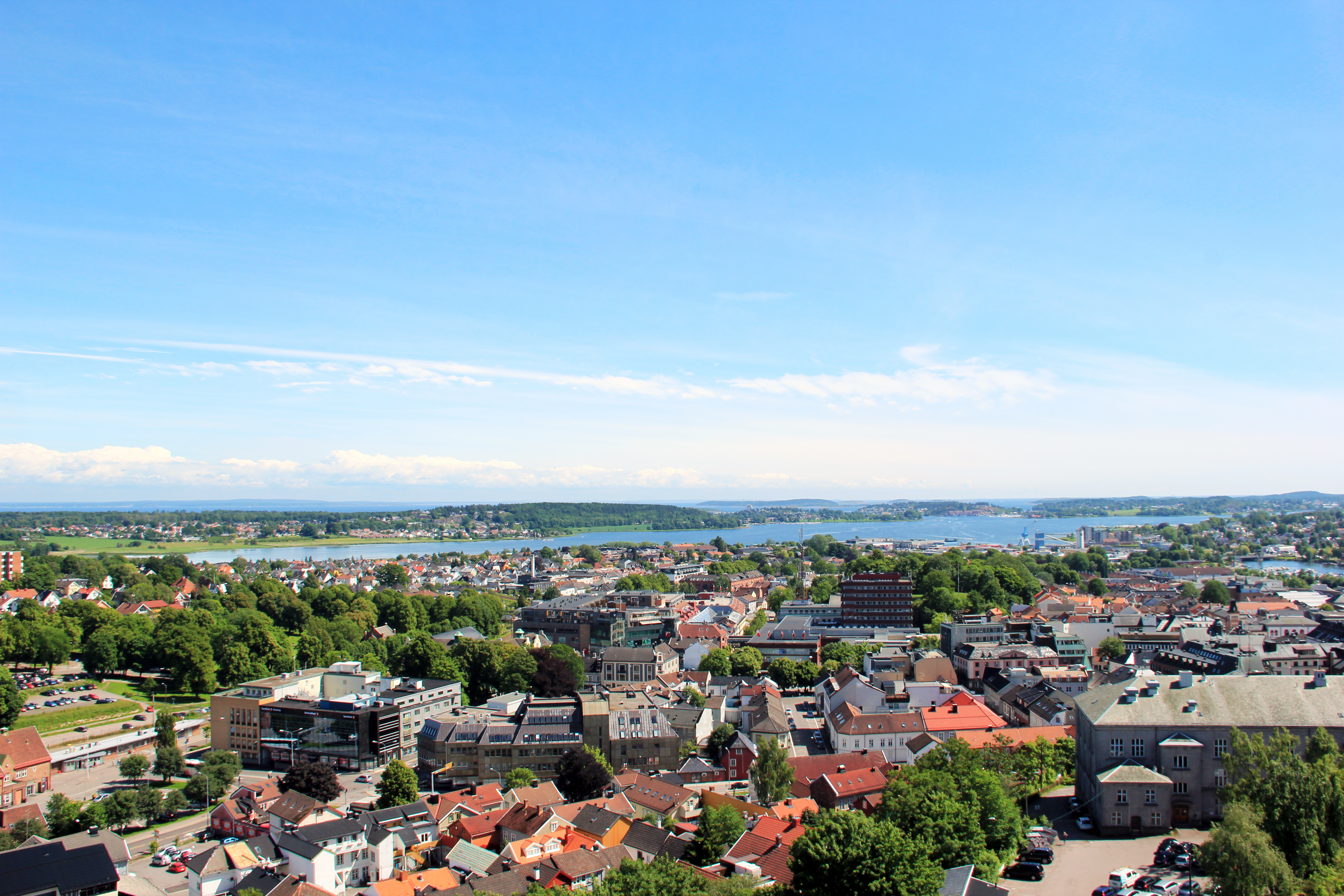
- View of the town
- Nickname: Sagabyen (lit. 'Town of Sagas')
- Interactive map of Tønsberg
- Coordinates: 59.26753°N 10.40763°E
- Country: Norway
- Region: Eastern Norway
- County: Vestfold
- District: Jarlsberg
- Municipality: Tønsberg Municipality
- Established as
- Kjøpstad: c. 871

Area
  - Total: 26.54 km^{2} (10.25 sq mi)
- Elevation: 10 m (33 ft)

Population (2026)
  - Total: 57,011
  - Density: 2,148/km^{2} (5,560/sq mi)
- Demonyms: Tønsbergensar; Tønsbergenser
- Time zone: UTC+01:00 (CET)
  - Summer (DST): UTC+02:00 (CEST)
- Post Code: 3111 Tønsberg

Tønsberg (pronounced [ˈtœ̂nsbær(ɡ)]; locally [ˈtœ̂nsbææʁ]) or historically Tunsberg, is a city in Tønsberg Municipality in Vestfold county, Norway. It is located about 102 kilometres (63 miles) south-southwest of the capital city of Oslo on the western coast of the Oslofjord near its mouth onto the Skagerrak. The city is the most populous metropolis in Vestfold county. Tønsberg also serves as the administrative centre for Vestfold county and the seat of the County Governor of Vestfold og Telemark.

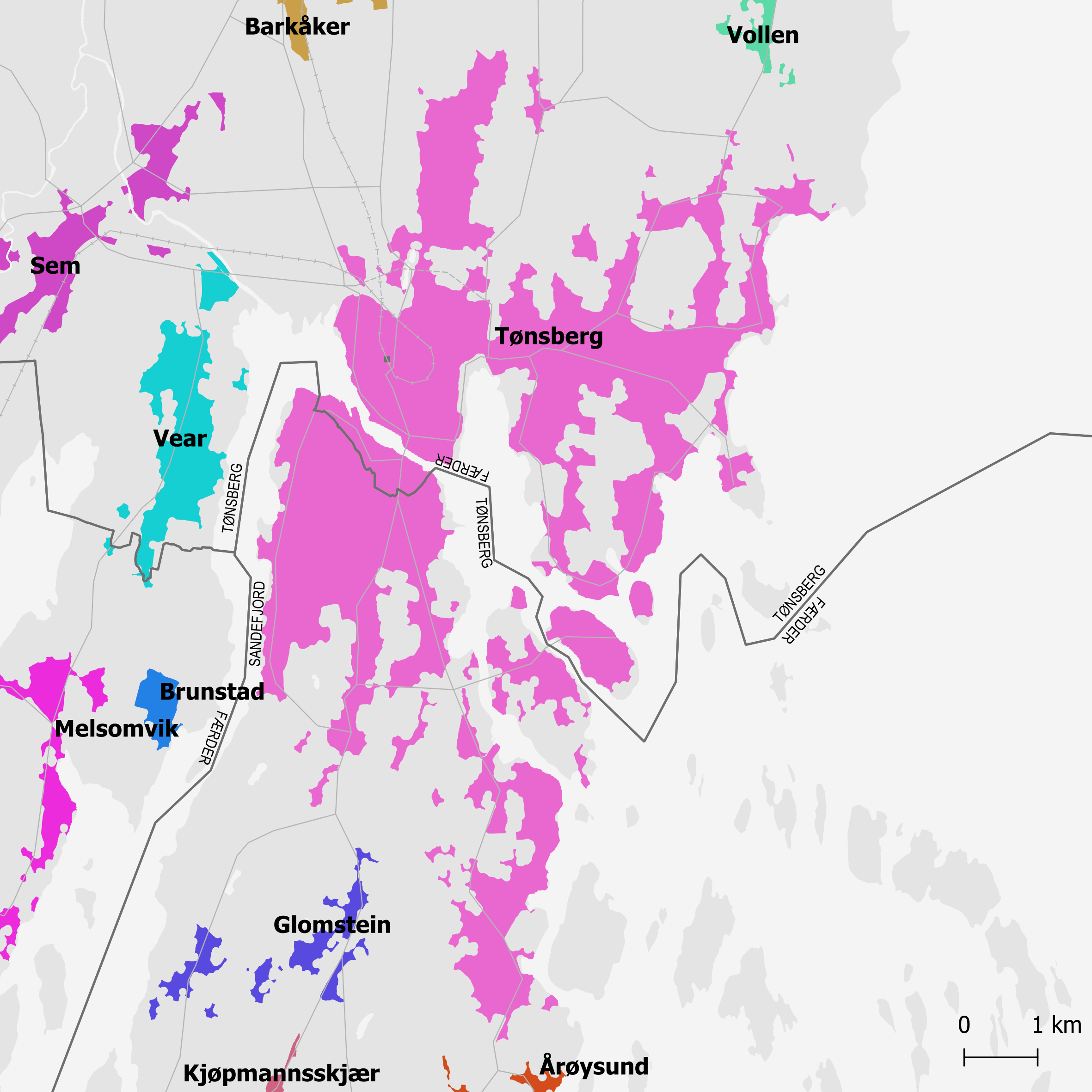
Map of the urban city of Tønsberg (pink)

Tønsberg is generally regarded as the oldest city in Norway, founded in the 9th century. Snorri Sturluson mentions the town in Harald Hårfagre's saga (written around 1220) before the battle at Hafrsfjord, which historians have traditionally dated to the year 872, therefore the town was in existence by 871 at the latest. This dating is again based on Are Frode's book, Íslendingabók. Using this information, Tønsberg celebrated its one-thousandth anniversary in 1871 and its 1100th anniversary in 1971. Archaeological findings confirm that there was a farm settlement in Tønsberg at the end of the 8th century, which likely developed into a town during the early 9th century.

The 26.52-square-kilometre (6,550-acre) city has a population (2026) of 57,011 and a population density of 2,148 inhabitants per square kilometre (5,560/sq mi). The city has actually grown to the south onto the island of Nøtterøy, so 10.45-square-kilometre (4.03 sq mi) of the city and 18,605 residents are actually located in Færder Municipality.

The city of Tønsberg was established as a municipality on 1 January 1838 (see formannskapsdistrikt law). The rural Sem Municipality was merged with the city of Tønsberg on 1 January 1988, creating a much larger Tønsberg Municipality. The neighboring Re Municipality was merged into Tønsberg on 1 January 2020.

The city is home to Tønsberg Fortress on Slottsfjellet ("Castle Mountain"), which includes ruins from Castrum Tunsbergis, Norway's largest castle in the 13th century. An outdoor music festival is held at Tønsberg Fortress every July. Tønsberg is also home of Oseberg Mound, where the 9th-century Oseberg Ship was excavated.

== General information ==
=== Name ===
The Old Norse name of the town was Túnsberg. The first element is the genitive case of tún (n) which means "fenced area", "garden", or "field around a dwelling". The last element is berg (n) which means "mountain" or "rock". The name originally referred to the fortifications on Slottsfjellet. The old spelling of the name has been retained in the name of the local diocese, Tunsberg bispedømme.

Seal of Tønsberg

=== Coat of arms ===
For a long time, the city did not have a formal coat of arms, but instead an old medieval seal dating back to 1349 was used in its place. The blue and white circular seal shows the Tønsberg Fortress surrounded by a ring wall on a mountain with the sea in front. There is also a longship in the water in front of the fortress. Around the seal are the Latin words SIGILLVM BVRGENSIVM D'TVNESBER which means "This is the seal of Tunsberg". The seal was also used for Tønsberg Municipality until 2020.

== History ==
=== Viking Age ===
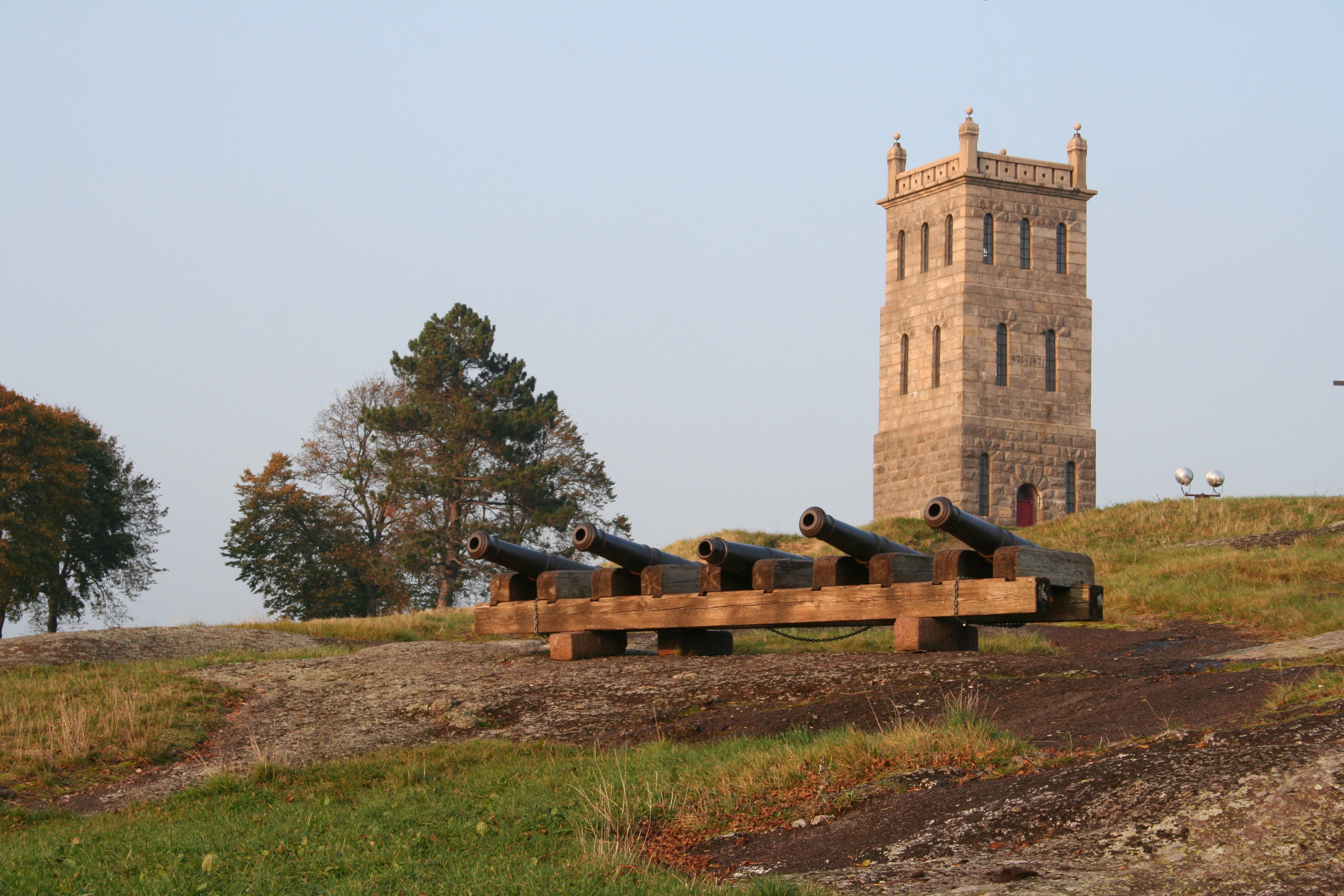
Tønsberg Fortress

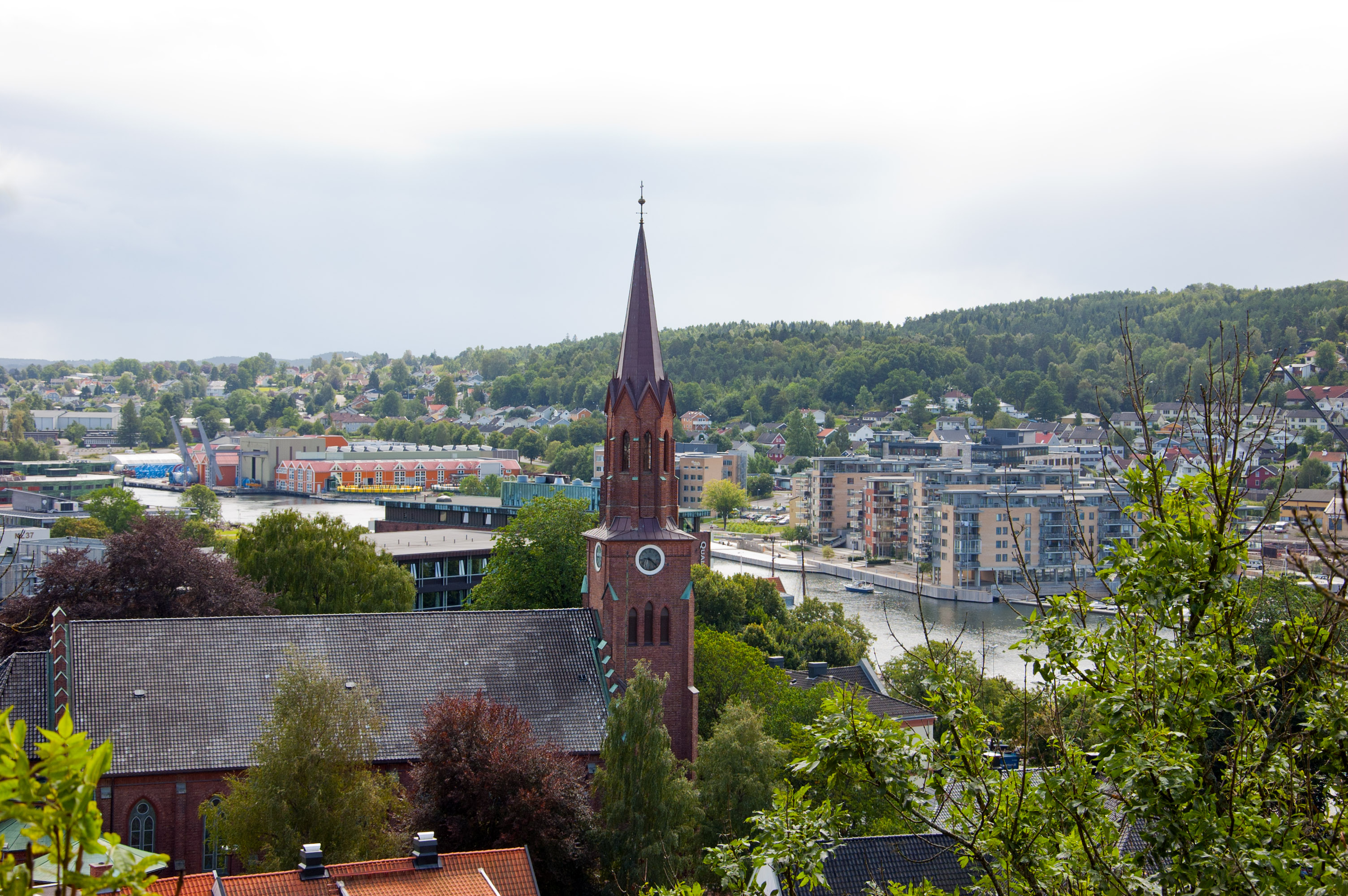
Tønsberg Cathedral

Tønsberg is the oldest city in Norway, founded by Harald Fairhair in the 9th century. It was also an ancient capital of Norway. The first time the town was mentioned by a contemporary writer was in 1130. According to Snorri Sturluson, Tønsberg was founded before the Battle of Hafrsfjord, which, according to Snorri, took place in 871. The year of the battle is disputed and most current historians believe it was closer to 900. If it took place in 871, this makes Tønsberg one of the oldest present Scandinavian cities. It was based upon this that the city's 1000 years jubilee was celebrated in 1871, and 1100 years jubilee in 1971. The archaeological excavations conducted in 1987–88 underneath the monastery ruins revealed several Viking graves which have served to confirm the earlier age of the original settlement.

The King or his ombudsman resided in the old Royal Court at Sæheimr, today the Jarlsberg Manor (Norwegian: Jarlsberg Hovedgård), and on the farm Haugar, (from the Old Norse word haugr meaning hill or burial mound), which can be assumed to have been Tønsberg's birthplace. Haugar became the seat for the Haugating, the Thing for Vestfold and Norway's second most important place for the proclamation of kings. The site had probably been named after two Viking Age mounds, which tradition links to two sons of King Harald I, Olaf Haraldsson Geirstadalf, who was king in Vestfold, and his half-brother, Sigrød Haraldsson, King of Trondheim. Both are presumed to have fallen in battle at Haugar against their half-brother Eric Bloodaxe and to have been buried on the same spot.

Slottsfjellet (Castle Mountain), north of the city centre, made for a near impregnable natural fortress. During the civil war era of the 12th century, it was fortified by the Baglers. The Birkebeiners besieged it for 20 weeks in the winter of 1201 before the Baglers surrendered. In the 13th century, King Haakon Haakonson set up a castle in Tønsberg, Tønsberg Fortress. The town was destroyed by fire in 1536, but Tønsberg remained one of the most important harbour towns in Norway. James VI of Scotland stopped in Tønsberg on his way to meet Anne of Denmark in Oslo, and David Lindsay gave a sermon on 16 November 1589. The event was recorded by a painted inscription in the church, which survives in the museum.

=== Whaling epoch ===
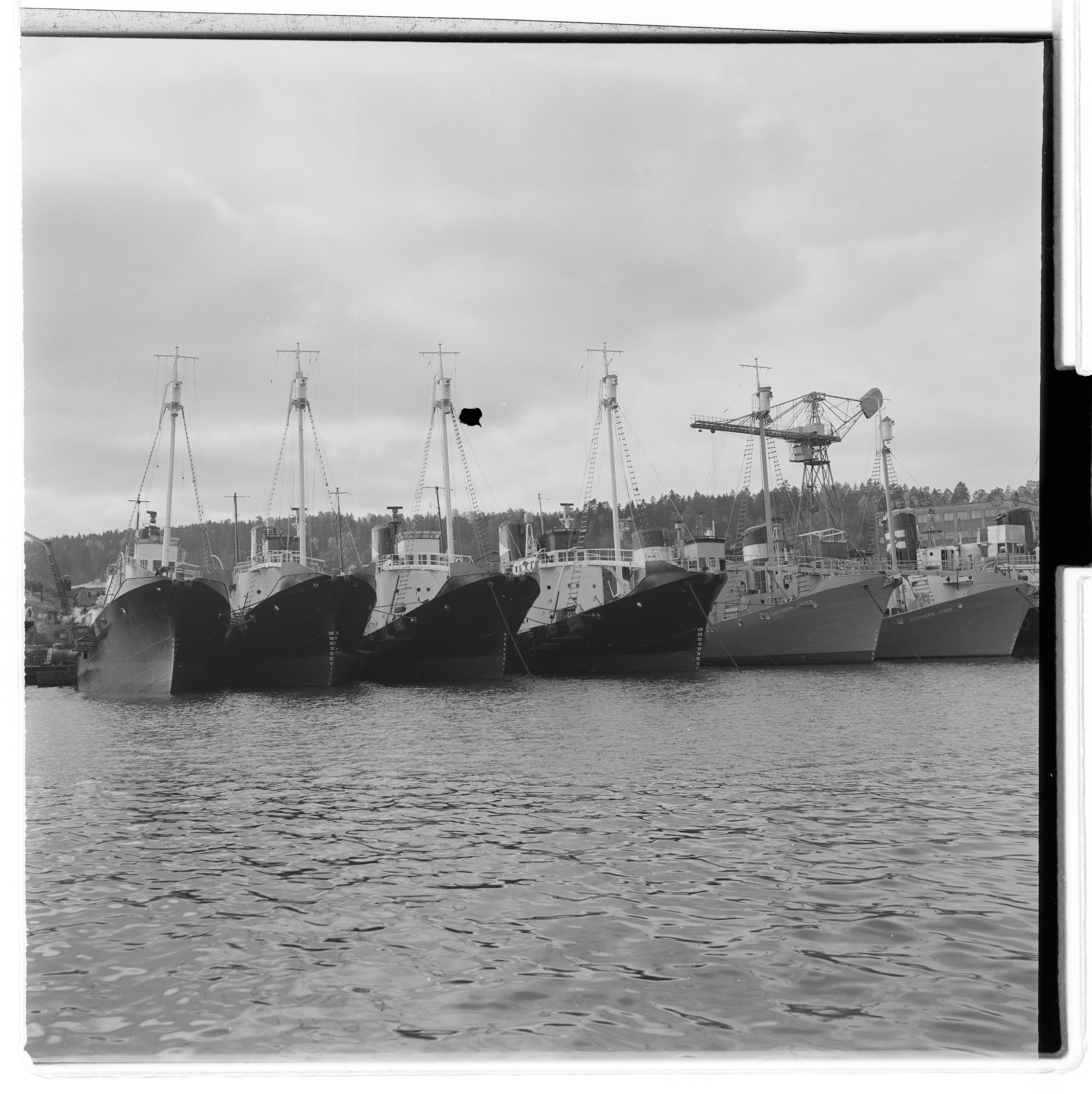
Whale-catchers in Tønsberg, 1952

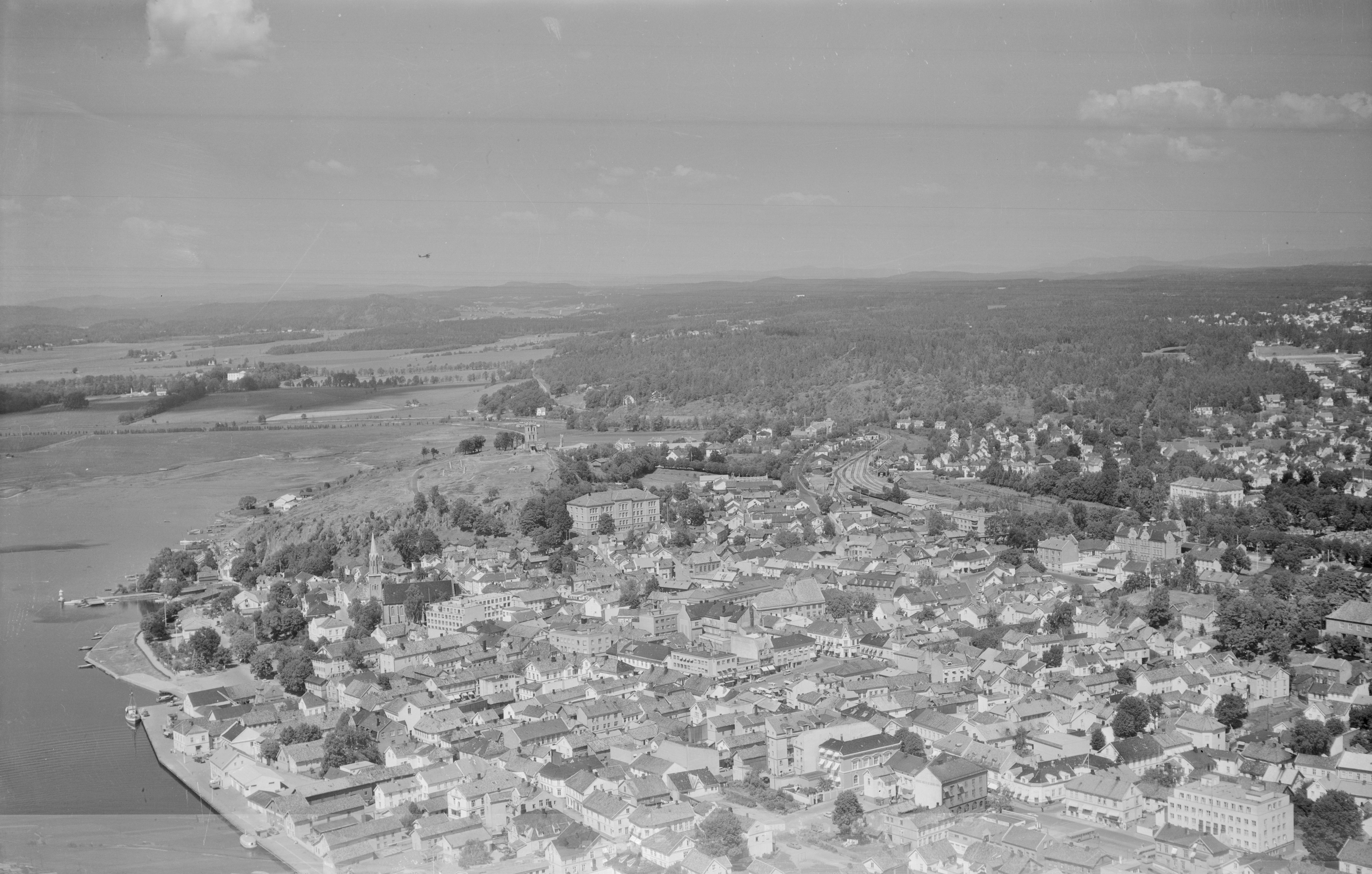
Widerøe aerial photography of town, July 1958

The center of the world's modern whaling industry was concentrated in the cities of Tønsberg and neighboring Sandefjord and Larvik, all of which were the dominant whaling towns in Norway. While whalers from Sandefjord established the first whaling station in the Faroe Islands, whalers from Tønsberg initiated whaling in Iceland and the Hebrides.

During the 1850s, Tønsberg turned into a base of operation and source of expertise for whalers in the Arctic and Antarctic Oceans. Tønsberg has been called "the cradle of modern whaling". In the 1892 publication "Handbook for Travellers in Norway" by John Murray, Tønsberg was described as "the centre of the Norwegian whaling and sealing industries in the Arctic Ocean."

The first whaling ventures to Antarctica was led by engineer Henrik Henriksen of Tønsberg. Henrik Johan Bull was another noted whaler from the city, known for his expeditions to Antarctica. Bull traveled from Australia to Tønsberg in order to learn from local whaler Svend Foyn, who is recognized as the pioneer of the modern whaling industry.

One of the city's most prominent residents, Svend Foyn, was a pioneer who embarked on an 1847 expedition to the Arctic, which led to a catch of 6,000 seals. Soon Tønsberg Harbor was home to a large fleet of sealing vessels, and the sealing industry grew further after the 1849 repeal of Britain's Navigation Acts. The hunters turned the seals to near extinction in the Arctic Ocean, and therefore turned to Bottle-nosed whales during the 1870s. Norway maintained a monopoly on European whaling until 1883, first and foremost due to Svend Foyn's patent rights to whaling techniques and inventions. Over-hunting in the Arctic eventually drove the whalers to Antarctica. By the beginning of the 20th century, Tønsberg had lost its preeminence in the whaling industry to the neighboring city of Sandefjord. Sandefjord, which lies just southwest of Tønsberg, later became known as the world's whaling capital.

=== World War II ===
During the German occupation of Norway in World War II, the Berg concentration camp was constructed near Tønsberg. In 1948, Tønsberg became the cathedral city of the Diocese of Tunsberg (Norwegian: Tunsberg bispedømme), based at the Tønsberg Cathedral. The diocese was created when the counties of Buskerud and Vestfold were separated from the Diocese of Oslo.

== Geography ==
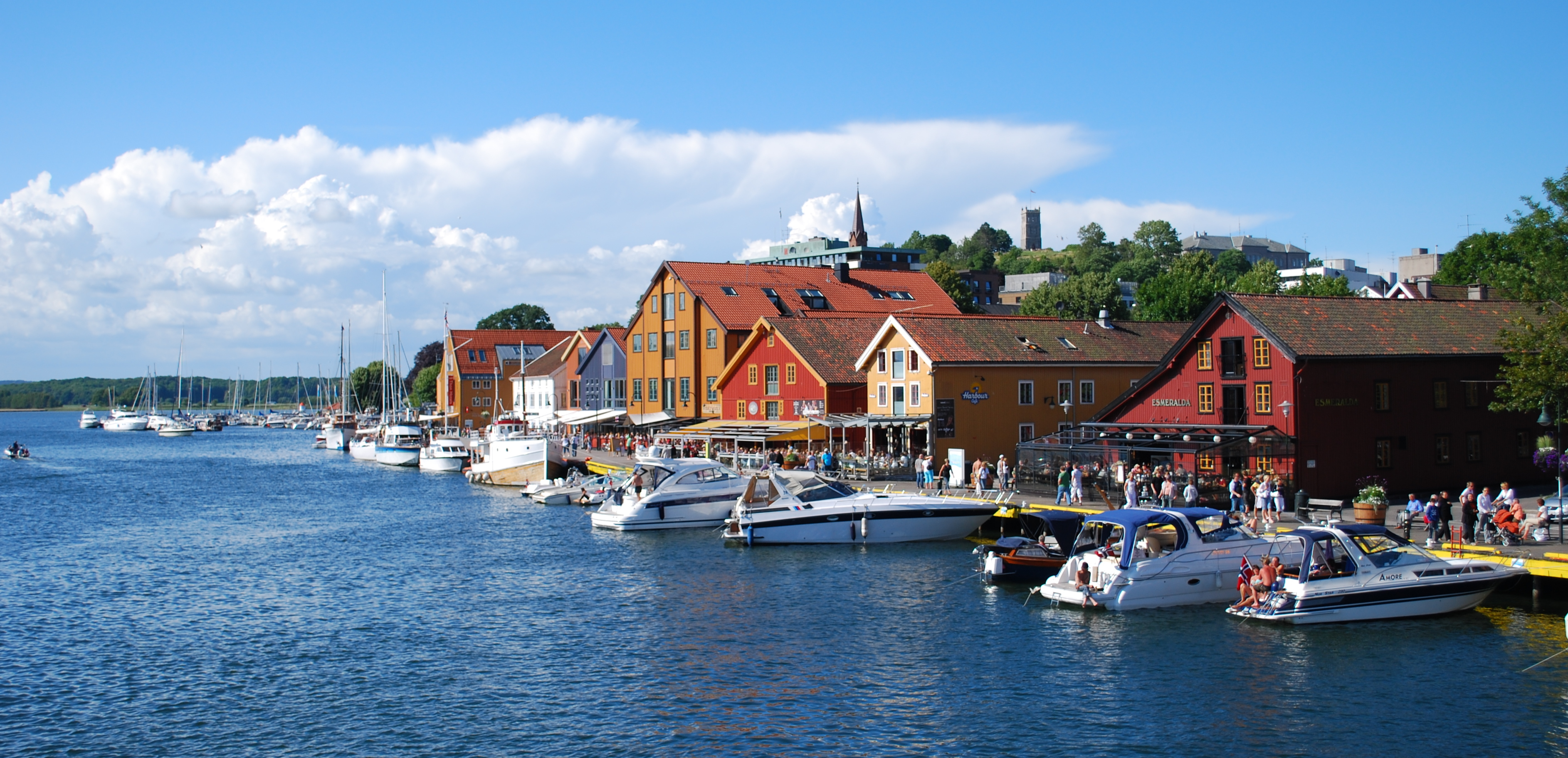
Tønsberg Wharf in city centre

Tønsberg is a city southeastern in Vestfold County, on the western shore of the Oslofjord. Tønsberg lies north of Færder, south of Horten, and north-east of Sandefjord. It is the ninth-largest city in Norway (by population). The city center lies just north of Nøtterøy Island.

Tønsberg Station is 5–10 minutes walking from the main square in the city centre, known as Torvet. From the main square is a few hundred meters along Rådhusgaten to the waterfront Tønsberg Wharf ("Tønsberg Brygge"), where most cafes, bars and restaurants are located. Just south of Tønsberg are the islands of Nøtterøy and Tjøme, which are tourist destinations.

The highest point in the city of Tønsberg is the 75-metre (246 ft) tall Frodeåsen hill on the north side of the city.

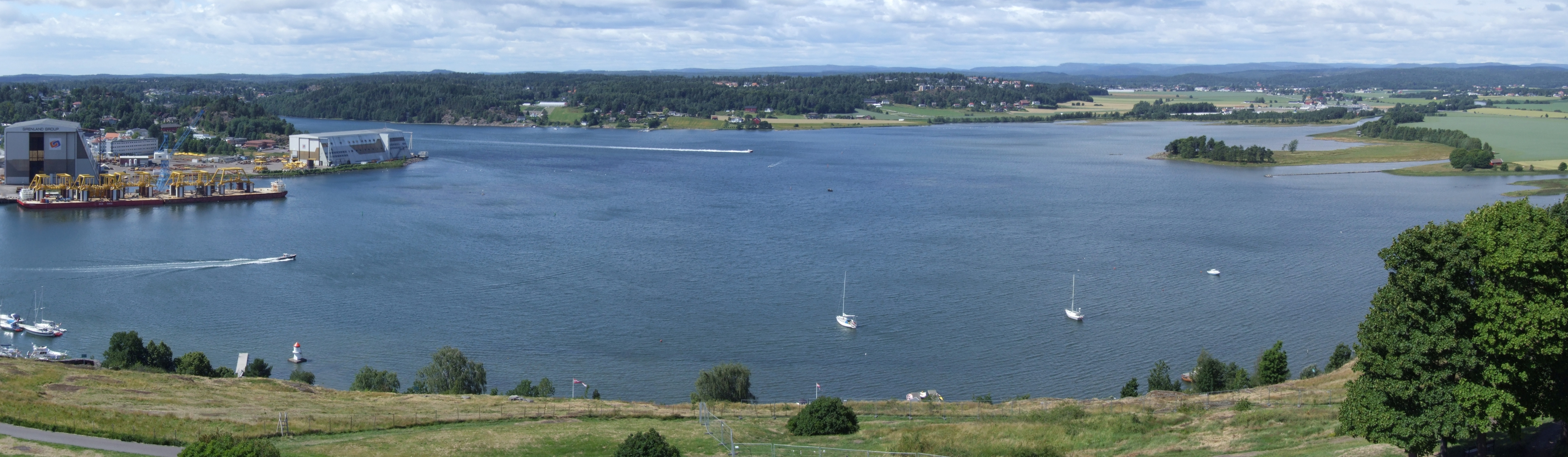
The Tønsberg Fjord as seen from Tønsberg Fortress.

=== Nature preserves ===
Tønsberg and its immediate surroundings is home to five nature preserves:

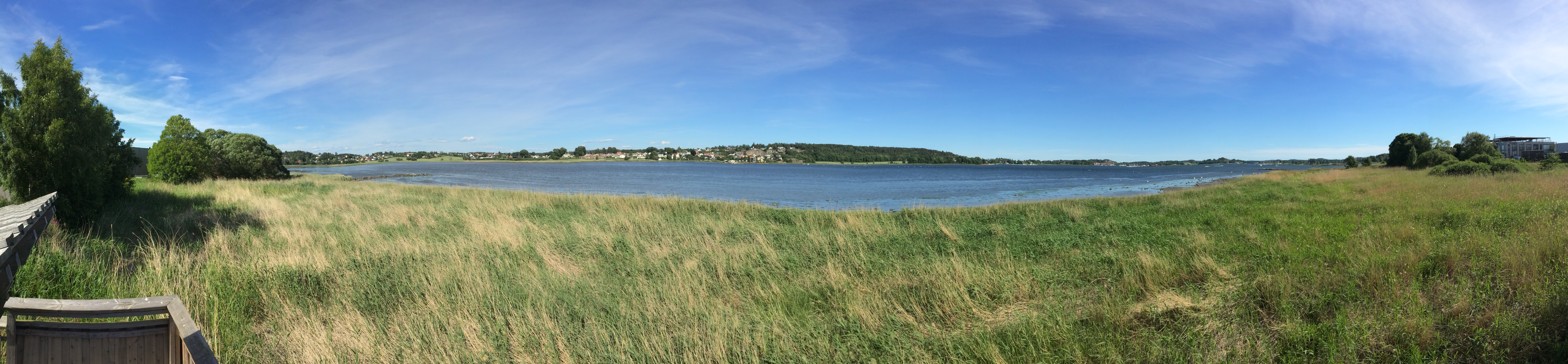
Presterødkilen Nature Preserve.

- Akersvannet (wetland), on the border with Sandefjord Municipality
- Bliksekilen (wetland)
- Gullkronene (deciduous forest)
- Ilene (wetland)
- Presterødkilen (wetland)

There is also a plant preserve at Karlsvika where the goal is the preservation of the threatened species fineleaf waterdropwort (Oenanthe aquatica), a rare species in Norway.

== Climate ==
Climate data for Tønsberg - Kilen 1991–2020 (3 m)
Month	Jan	Feb	Mar	Apr	May	Jun	Jul	Aug	Sep	Oct	Nov	Dec	Year
Daily mean °C (°F)	−1.4 (29.5)	−1.2 (29.8)	1.7 (35.1)	6.2 (43.2)	11.1 (52.0)	15.0 (59.0)	17.2 (63.0)	16.8 (62.2)	12.6 (54.7)	7.3 (45.1)	3.1 (37.6)	−0.7 (30.7)	7.3 (45.2)
Average precipitation mm (inches)	73 (2.9)	54 (2.1)	48 (1.9)	51 (2.0)	71 (2.8)	71 (2.8)	72 (2.8)	93 (3.7)	86 (3.4)	106 (4.2)	95 (3.7)	86 (3.4)	906 (35.7)
Source: yr.no (mean, precipitation)

== Government ==
In Norway, municipalities are the unit of local government. This means that cities and towns are simply designations for urban areas, but under current Norwegian law, they have no actual government authority. The city of Tønsberg lies within Tønsberg Municipality and is therefore governed by the municipal council of Tønsberg Municipality.

== Demographics ==
Historical population
Year	1801	1815	1825	1835	1845	1855	1865	1875	1891	1900	1910	1920	1930	1946	1951	1960	1970	1980	2000	2009	2020	2023
Pop.	1,543	1,490	1,907	1,970	2,245	2,874	4,541	5,174	7,215	8,611	9,769	12,568	11,997	11,883	12,208	12,591	11,284	9,247	43,346	47,465	53,018	55,387
±% p.a.	—	−0.25%	+2.50%	+0.33%	+1.32%	+2.50%	+4.68%	+1.31%	+2.10%	+1.98%	+1.27%	+2.55%	−0.46%	−0.06%	+0.54%	+0.34%	−1.09%	−1.97%	+8.03%	+1.01%	+1.01%	+1.47%
Source: Statistics Norway and Norwegian Historical Data Centre

The whole urban area of the city of Tønsberg is the 9th most populous city/urban area in Norway and the largest city in Vestold County. The 26.31-square-kilometre (6,500-acre) city has a population (2023) of 55,387 and a population density of 2,105 inhabitants per square kilometre (5,450/sq mi). The city has actually grown to the south onto the island of Nøtterøy, so 10.37-square-kilometre (4.00 sq mi) of the city and 17,979 residents are actually located in Færder Municipality. The urban area of the city of Tønsberg extends from Eik in the north, to Tolvsrød, Vallø and Ringshaug in the east and Borgheim on Nøtterøy in the south. The city experienced a 20.8% population growth between 2000 and 2015, compared to 14.0% for Vestfold County as a whole. Furthermore, Tønsberg has the highest urbanization rate in Vestfold. While 94.6 percent of residents in Tønsberg Municipality are residing in cities, the equivalent number for Vestfold County is 84.8 percent. As of 2018, the largest minority groups were Polish (1.68%), Lithuanians (1.11%), Iraqis (1.06%), Swedes (0.75%), and Syrians (0.64%).

== Sport ==
FK Tønsberg is the premier football team in Tønsberg, currently playing in the 2. divisjon as of 2017.

Tønsberg Vikings is the local hockey team, who play at the Tønsberg Ishall. The club played in the GET-ligaen until 2014. The Maier Arena Tønsberg is an outdoor ice skating arena on the same site as the Tønsberg Ishall and is used for speed skating. It once hosted motorcycle speedway, being the venue for the 1950 Norwegian Championship.

Tønsberg hosted a round of the powerboating UIM F2 World Championship from 2014 to 2018.

== Tourist sites ==
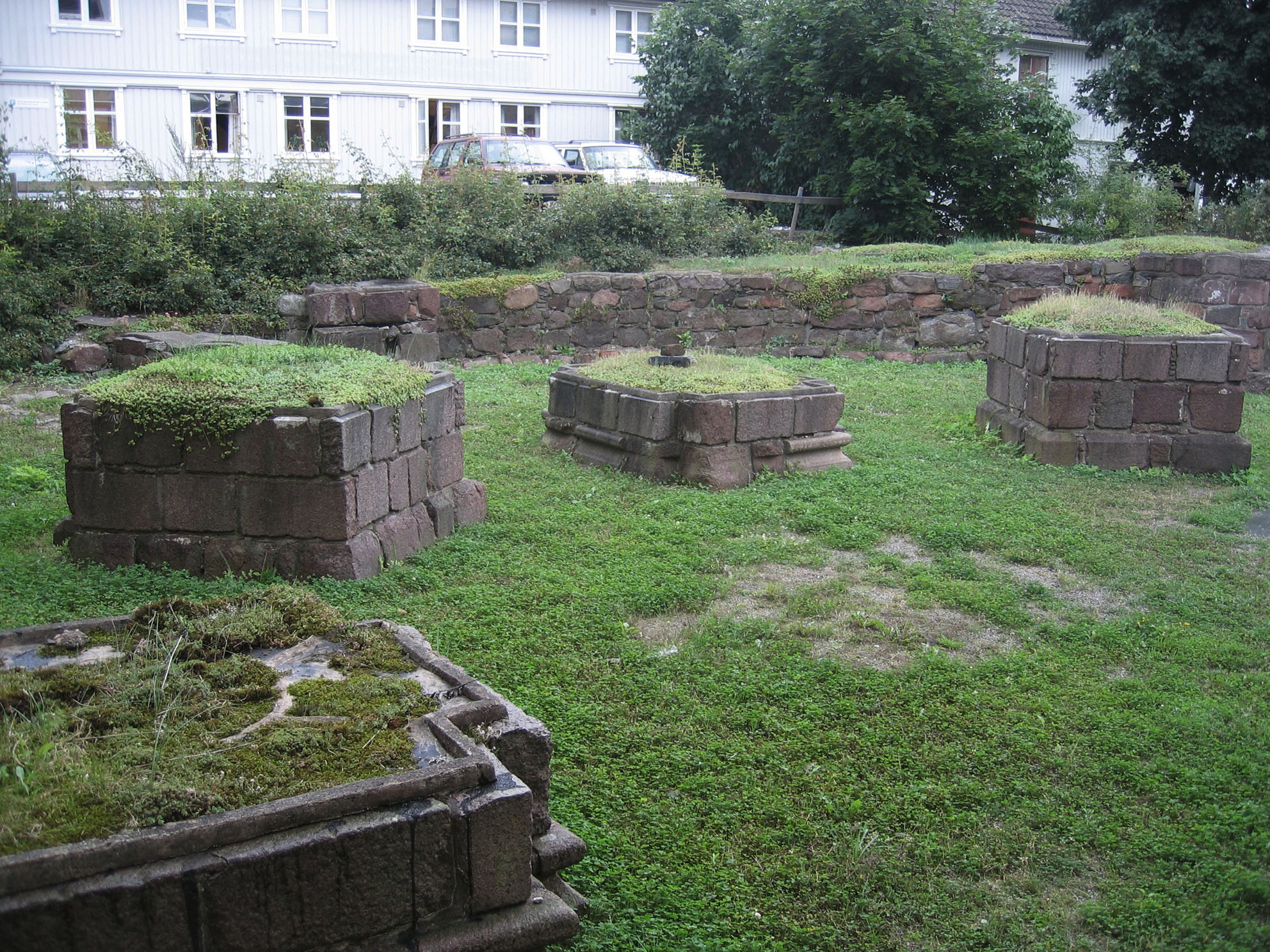
Ruins of St. Olav's Church.

Perhaps the most important landmark in the town is Slottsfjellet, the tower standing on the hill. It was erected in 1888 as a memorial to Tønsberg Fortress (Tunsberg festning), the old fortress, of which just fragmentary ruins remain today. Below the mountain there is a museum dedicated to "Slottsfjellet" and Tønsberg. There are several exhibitions here about whaling and the fortress, Tønsberg Fortress. Several streets in the town are named after old kings of Norway.

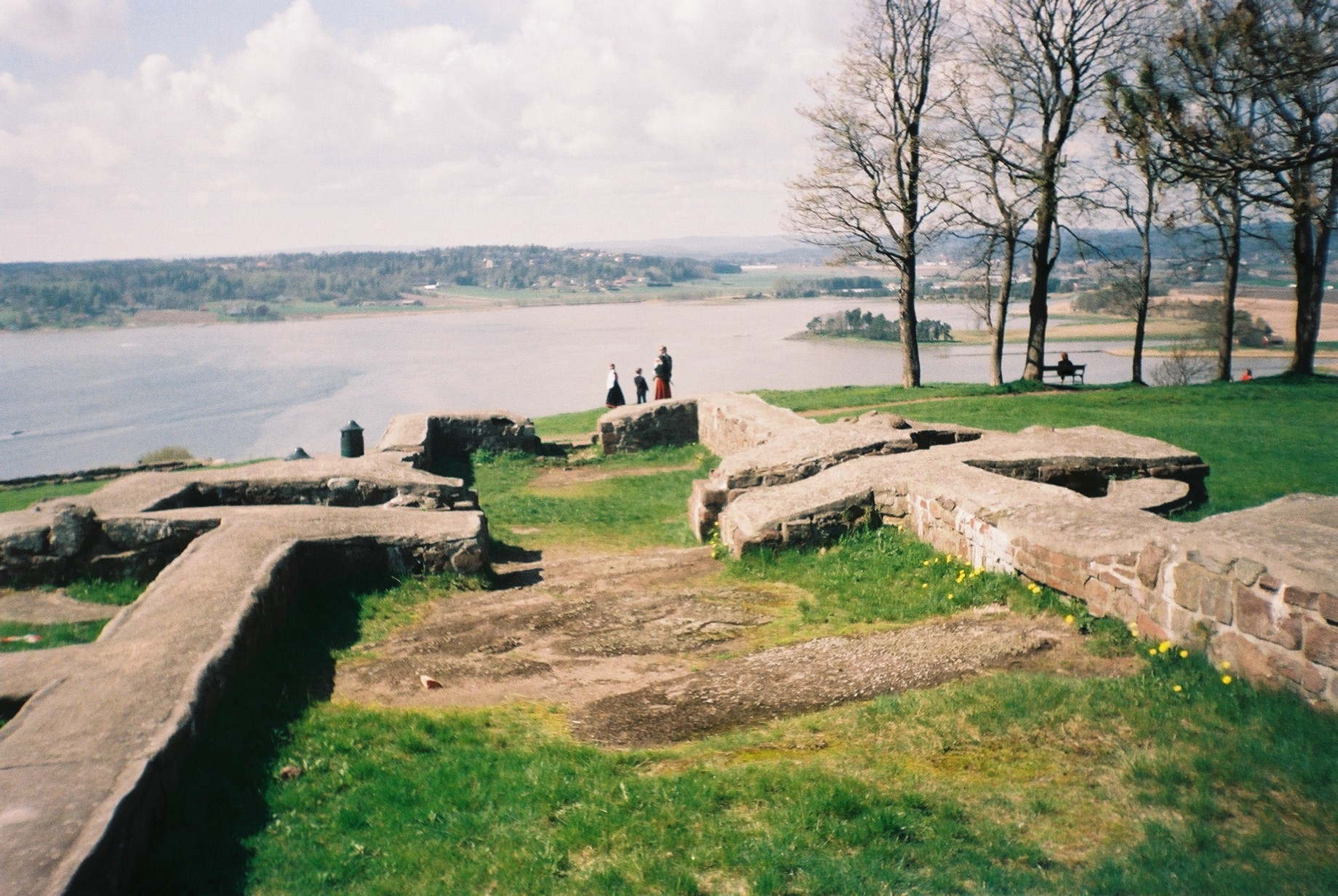
Ruins of St Michael's Church.

Other notable tourist sites include:

- Haugar Art Museum (Haugar Vestfold Kunstmuseum), located in the former Seamen's School in the middle of Tønsberg, the brick building was built 1918–1921. The museum was established in 1993 as a foundation created by Vestfold county and municipality of Tønsberg. The museum is a division of Vestfold Museum (Vestfoldmuseene). Haugar Vestfold Art Museum is located in the parkland between the site of the ancient assembly of Haugating and the two Viking era mounds.
- Foynegården, the city's best-preserved merchant's yard. Foynegården is the site of a patrician houses from the 1700s where Svend Foyn was born in 1809.
- Ruins of St. Olav's Church (Olavskirka), a former monastery founded in 1191, located near the current Tønsberg Library.
- Ruins of St Michael's Church (Mikaelskirka), ruins that are still visible on top of Castle Mountain by Tønsberg Fortress. The church was mentioned among the royal chapels. It is believed to have been destroyed in 1503 when Swedish soldiers razed fortifications.
- Sem Church (Sem kirke), Vestfold's oldest stone church built before 1100 in the Romanesque style, located near the Jarlsberg Estate, just west of the city of Tønsberg
- Tønsberg Cathedral (Tønsberg domkirke), a brick church from 1858 with pulpit from 1621 and an altarpiece from 1764.
- Slottsfjell festival, one of the biggest happenings in Tønsberg through the year. People all over the country come to Tønsberg to participate, this festival is one of Tønsberg newly landmarks.

=== Oseberg Mound ===
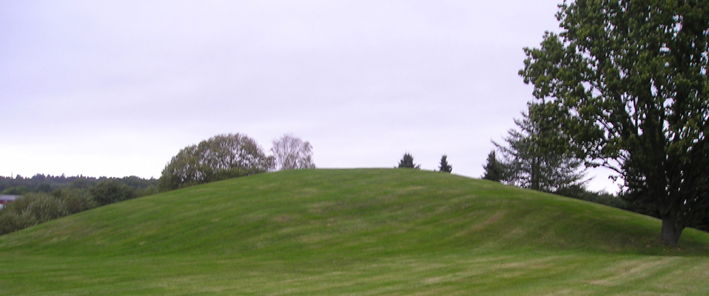
Oseberghaugen, the Oseberg burial mound from early Viking Age.

Tønsberg is the site of Oseberg Mound, a Viking era burial mound. The Oseberg Ship was found in the Oseberg burial mound in 1904. This Viking era longship is now in the Viking Ship Museum in Oslo. Archaeological excavations in 1904 uncovered history's largest and richest example of craftsmanship from the Viking Age. In addition to the Oseberg Ship, Oseberghaugen contained the Oseberg carriage, five intricately carved bed-posts shaped like animal heads, four sledges, beds, chests, weaving-frames, household utensils and much more. Scientific examinations in 1992 now date the burial to 834 AD, and indicate a probability that it was Queen Alvhild, the first wife of King Gudrød, who was buried here.

When unearthed, the ship was buried in blue clay and covered with stones beneath the 6-metre (20 ft) high Oseberg Mound.

== Economy ==
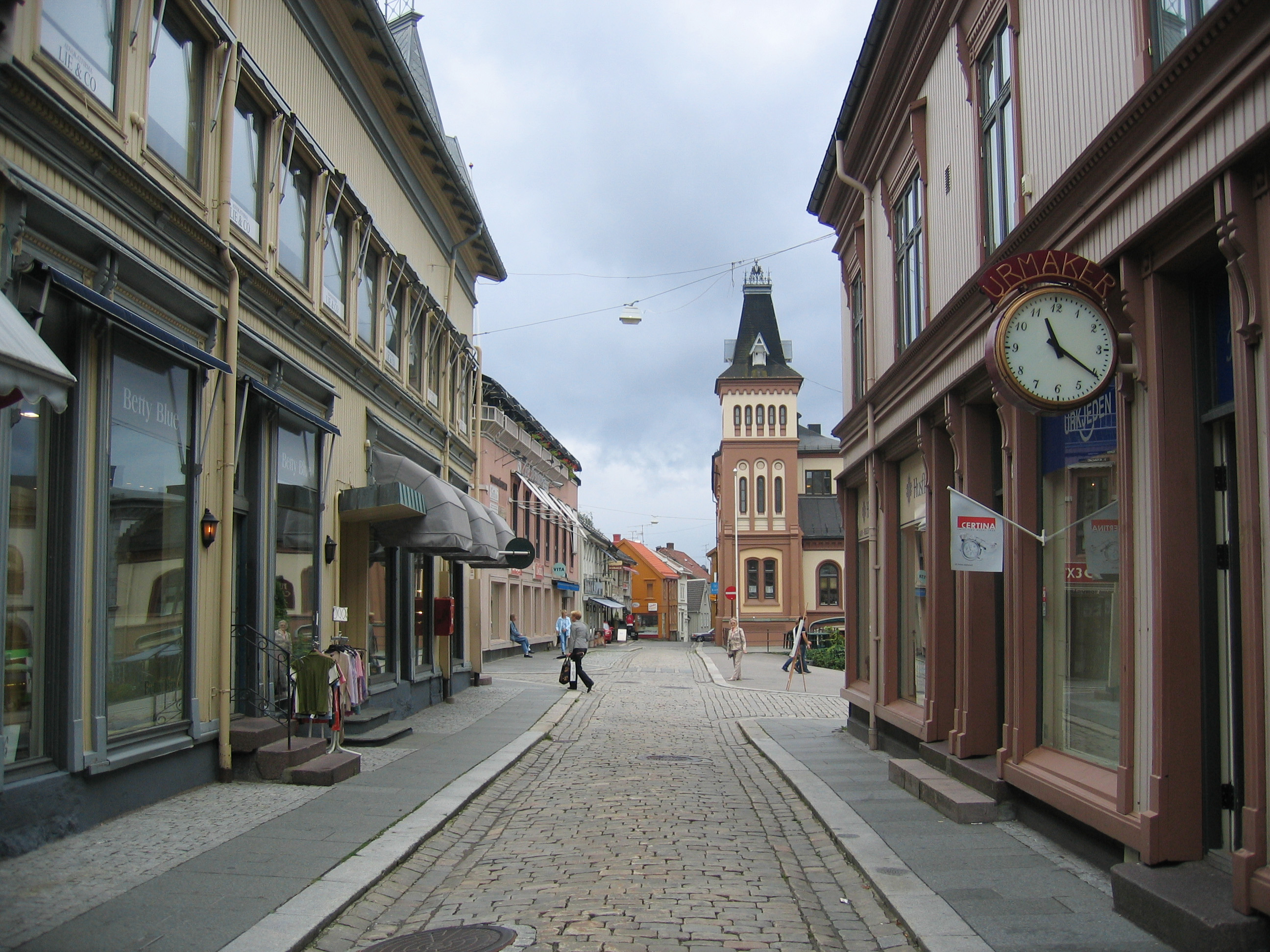
Øvre Langgate street (Tønsberg)

Tønsberg is mostly a shopping town and an administrative centre. It is also noted especially for its silverware.

== Transport ==
The city is served by the railway line Vestfoldbanen, which runs in a loop through the city before reaching Tønsberg Station.

== In popular culture ==
Tønsberg has been featured as a location in several films, most notably those set in the Marvel Cinematic Universe (MCU). It is first mentioned in the 2010 film Iron Man 2 as a location under surveillance by S.H.I.E.L.D. In the 2011 film Thor, it is established that centuries ago, Tønsberg was the invasion point of the Frost Giants of Jotunheim, who sought to conquer Earth before they were defeated by Odin and the forces of Asgard. It is then seen in Captain America: The First Avenger, where the Red Skull acquires the Tesseract from a church. In the 2017 film Thor: Ragnarok, Odin chooses the town as the site of his death. In Avengers: Endgame, the town is renamed "New Asgard" and serves as a refuge for the Asgardians who survived Thanos's attack during the events of Avengers: Infinity War, with Valkyrie as its leader. In Thor: Love and Thunder, New Asgard has become a tourist attraction, but suffers political turmoil as a result of discrimination against otherworldly beings. The Tønsberg raid by Hydra is also recreated in the first episode of What If...?, occurring later than in Captain America: The First Avenger.

Tønsberg is also featured in the 2010 game Mount and Blade: Warband's Viking Conquest expansion as the capital of the Kingdom of Northvegr.

== Notable people ==
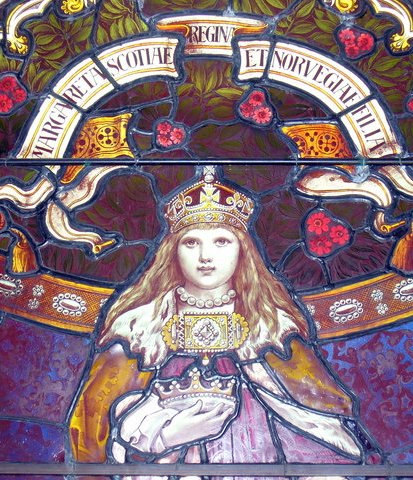
Margaret, Maid of Norway in Lerwick Town Hall

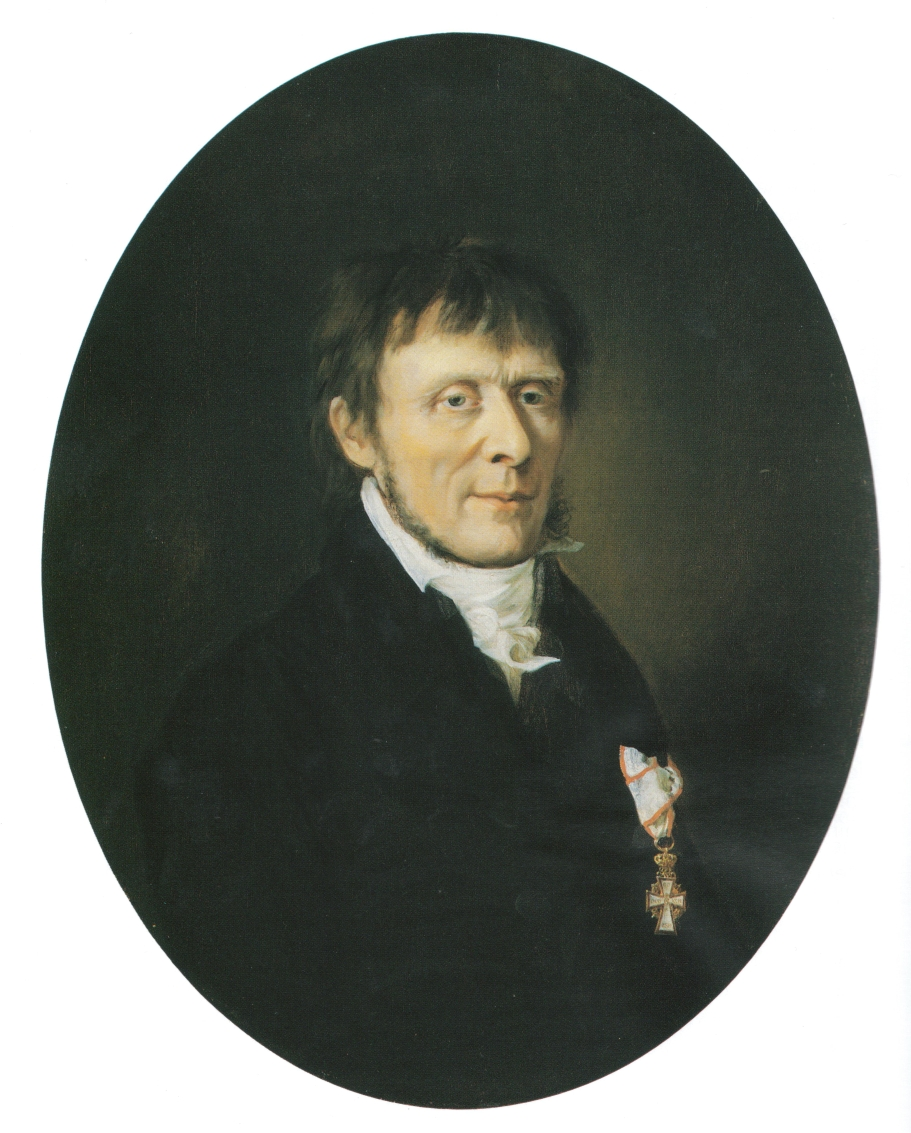
CP Stoltenberg, 1820

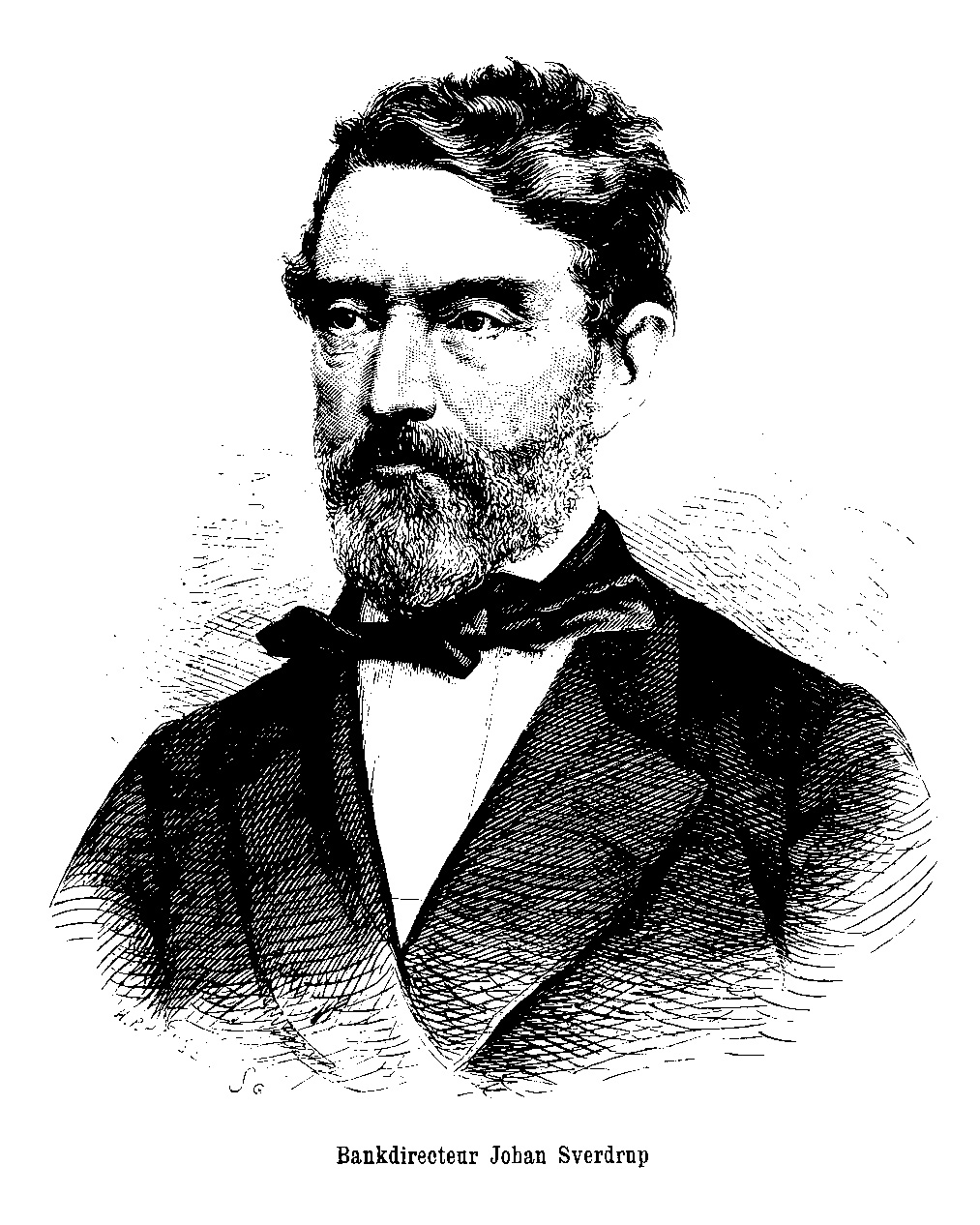
Johan Sverdrup, 1874

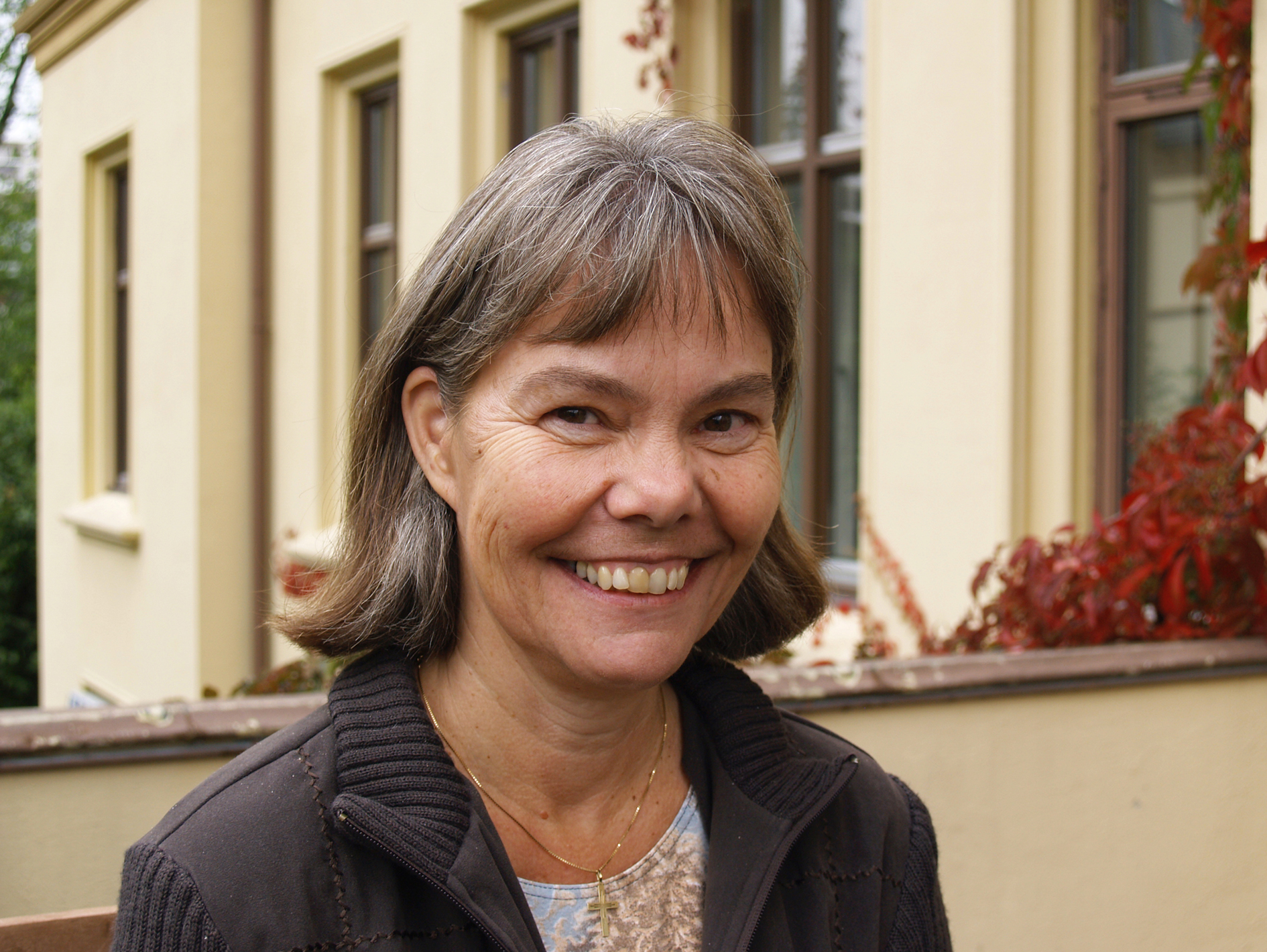
Laila Riksaasen Dahl, 2006

=== Royalty ===
- Bjørn Farmann (died c. 930), the King of Vestfold who founded Tønsberg
- Magnus VI of Norway (1238–1280), the King of Norway (as Magnus VI) from 1263 to 1280
- Margaret, Maid of Norway (1283–1290), the Queen-designate of Scotland from 1286
- Else Werring (1905–1989), a Norwegian royal hostess and Chief Court Mistress from 1958

=== Public Service & Business ===
- Cecilie Christine Schøller (1720–1786), a socialite who built Stiftsgården, a royal residence
- Carl Peter Stoltenberg (1770–1830), a merchant and representative at Norwegian Constituent Assembly
- Adrian Benjamin Bentzon (1777–1827), the Governor of the Danish West Indies from 1816 to 1820
- Gregers Winther Wulfsberg (1780–1846), a jurist and representative at the Norwegian Constituent Assembly
- Svend Foyn (1809–1894), a shipping and whaling magnate who introduced sealing to Vestfold
- Johan Henrik Dietrichs (1809–1886), a merchant and mayor of the town
- Johan Sverdrup (1816–1892), a liberal politician and prime minister of Norway from 1884 to 1889
- Wilhelm Wilhelmsen (1839–1910), a shipping magnate and founder of the Wilh. Wilhelmsen Shipping Company
- Henrik Johan Bull (1844–1930), a whaler and pioneering Antarctic explorer
- brothers Peter Christophersen (1845–1930) & Søren Andreas Christophersen (1849–1933), diplomats in Argentina
- Niels Johan Føyn (1860–1945), a meteorologist
- Axel Thue (1863–1922), a Norwegian American mathematician
- Ditlef Hvistendahl Christiansen (1865–1944), a Norwegian Supreme Court Justice from 1911–1936
- Ole O. Lian (1868–1925), a politician and leader of the Norwegian Confederation of Trade Unions
- Halfdan M. Hanson (1884–1952), a Norwegian American architect
- Ole Aanderud Larsen (1884–1964), a ship designer who designed the Endurance
- Eugène Olaussen (1887–1962), a newspaper editor and politician (from communist to Nazi)
- Arnold Rørholt (1909–1986), a jurist and refugee worker
- Ebba Lodden (1913–1997), a civil servant, politician, and first female County Governor
- Jan Mehlum (born 1945), an author and academic who comes from Tønsberg
- Laila Riksaasen Dahl (born 1947), a theologian and bishop of the Diocese of Tunsberg from 2002-2014
- Jan Otto Myrseth (born 1957), a prelate and current Bishop of Tunsberg
- Per Arne Olsen (born 1961), a politician and Mayor of Tønsberg from 2003 to 2009
- Reidar Hjermann (born 1969), a psychologist and former Children's Ombudsman of Norway
- Joshua French (born 1982), a Norwegian-British murderer convicted in the Democratic Republic of the Congo

=== The Arts ===
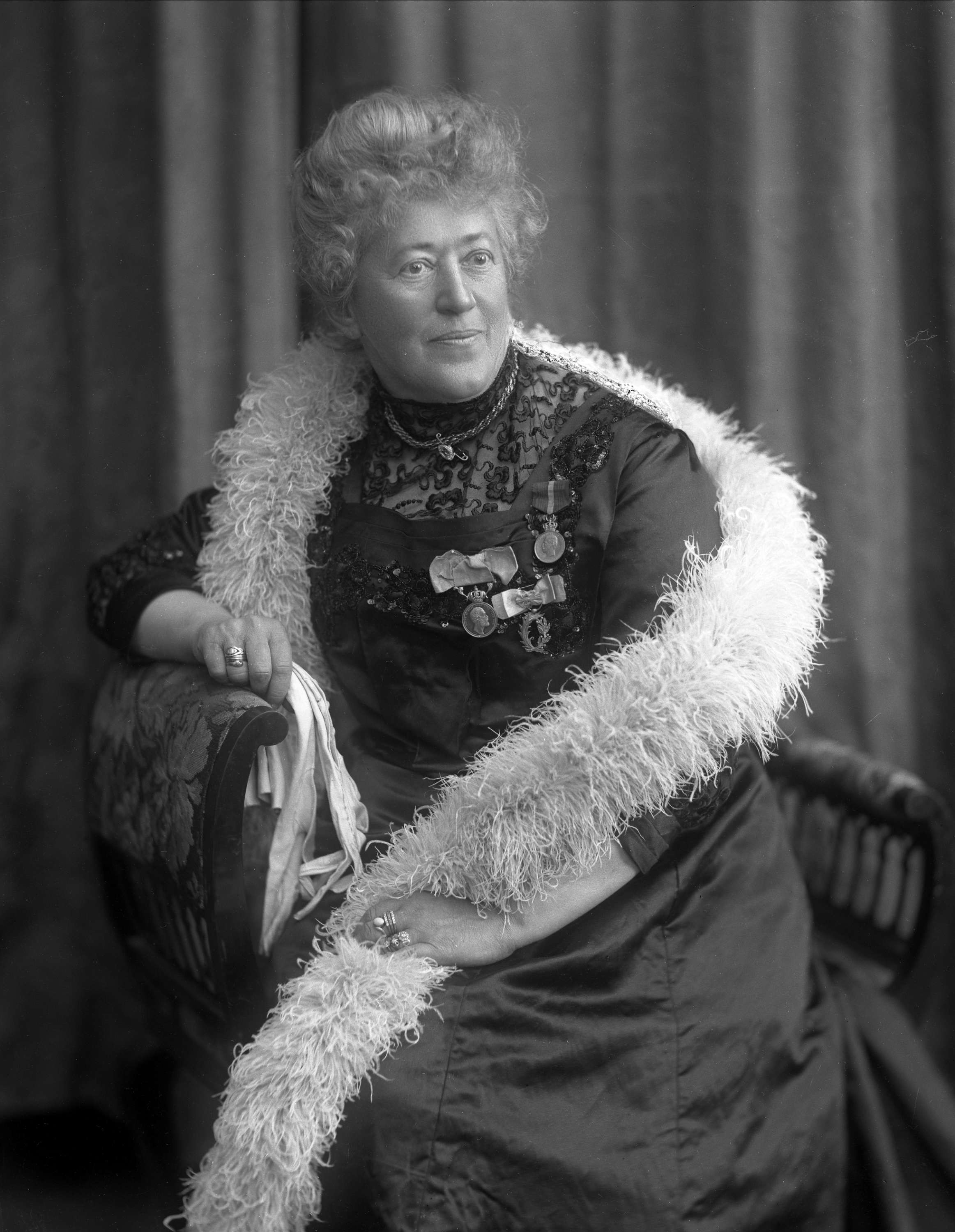
Clara Tschudi, 1911

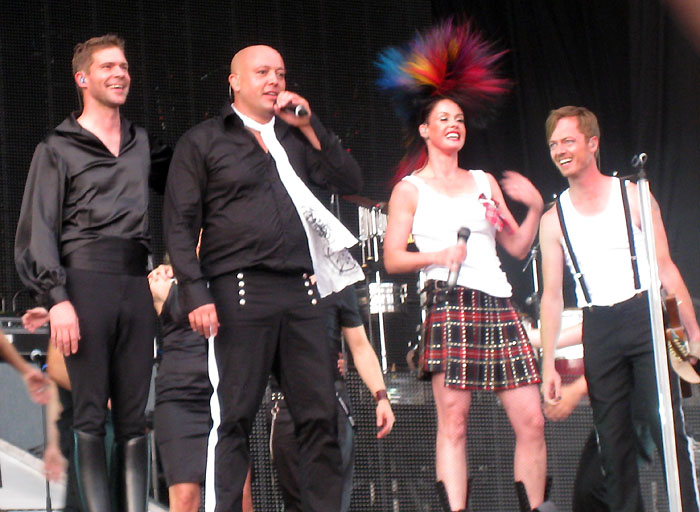
Lene Nystrøm, vocalist in Aqua

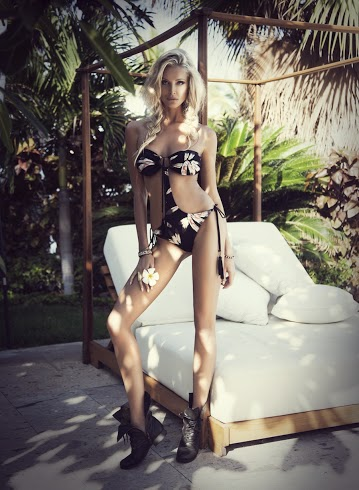
Monica Hansen, 2020

- Mathias Stoltenberg (1799–1871), a portrait painter and furniture restorer
- Clara Tschudi (1856–1945), a writer of biographies of contemporary and historical women
- Elisabeth Meyer (1899–1968), a photographer and journalist
- Thomas Thomassen (1878–1962), an actor, director, and theater manager
- Per Gjersøe (1908–1980), an actor and film director
- Kåre Holt (1916–1997), an author from Våle
- Per Asplin (1928–1996), a pianist, singer, composer, and actor
- Kjell Heggelund (1932–2017), a literary researcher, lecturer, editor, poet, and literary critic
- Wenche Blomberg (born 1943), an author, journalist, librarian, and criminologist
- Bjørn Floberg (born 1947), an actor of film, TV, and theatre
- Jahn Teigen (1949–2020), a singer, comedian, and three-time competitor in the Eurovision Song Contest
- Ingvar Ambjørnsen (1956–2025), a writer who was born in Tønsberg
- Gro Dahle (born 1962), an author and poet who grew up in Tønsberg
- Egil Nyhus & Svein Nyhus (born 1962), twin brothers who are both illustrators
- Sturla Berg-Johansen (born 1967), a stand-up comedian who comes from Tønsberg
- Ilze Burkovska Jacobsen, (Norwegian Wiki) (born 1971), a Latvian filmmaker who lives in Tønsberg
- Lene Nystrøm (born 1973), the lead vocalist of the Danish-Norwegian dance group Aqua
- Line Horntveth (born 1974) & Martin Horntveth (born 1977) & Lars Horntveth (born 1980), siblings were all jazz musicians
- Frøy Aagre (born 1977), a jazz tenor and soprano saxophone player
- Jonas Bendiksen (born 1977), a photographer and member of Magnum Photos
- Monica Hansen (born 1982), a model, television host, and swimwear designer
- Seigmen (formed 1989), an alternative rock band that comes from Tønsberg
- Kyrre Gørvell-Dahll (born 1991), known as Kygo, a DJ, songwriter, and record producer
- Adelén (born 1996), a singer
- Emma Ellingsen (born 2001), a transgender model and YouTuber

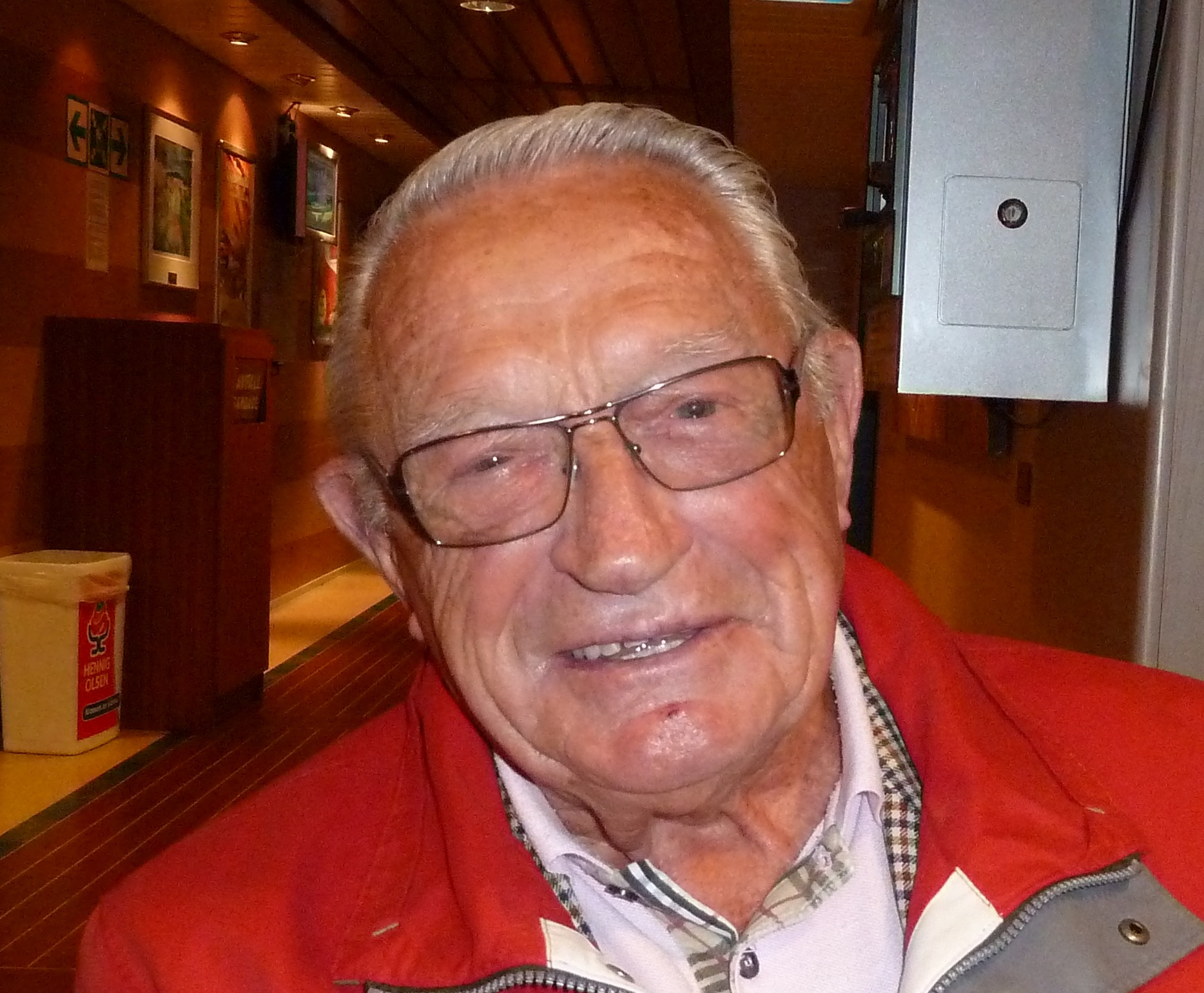
Hjalmar Andersen, 2010

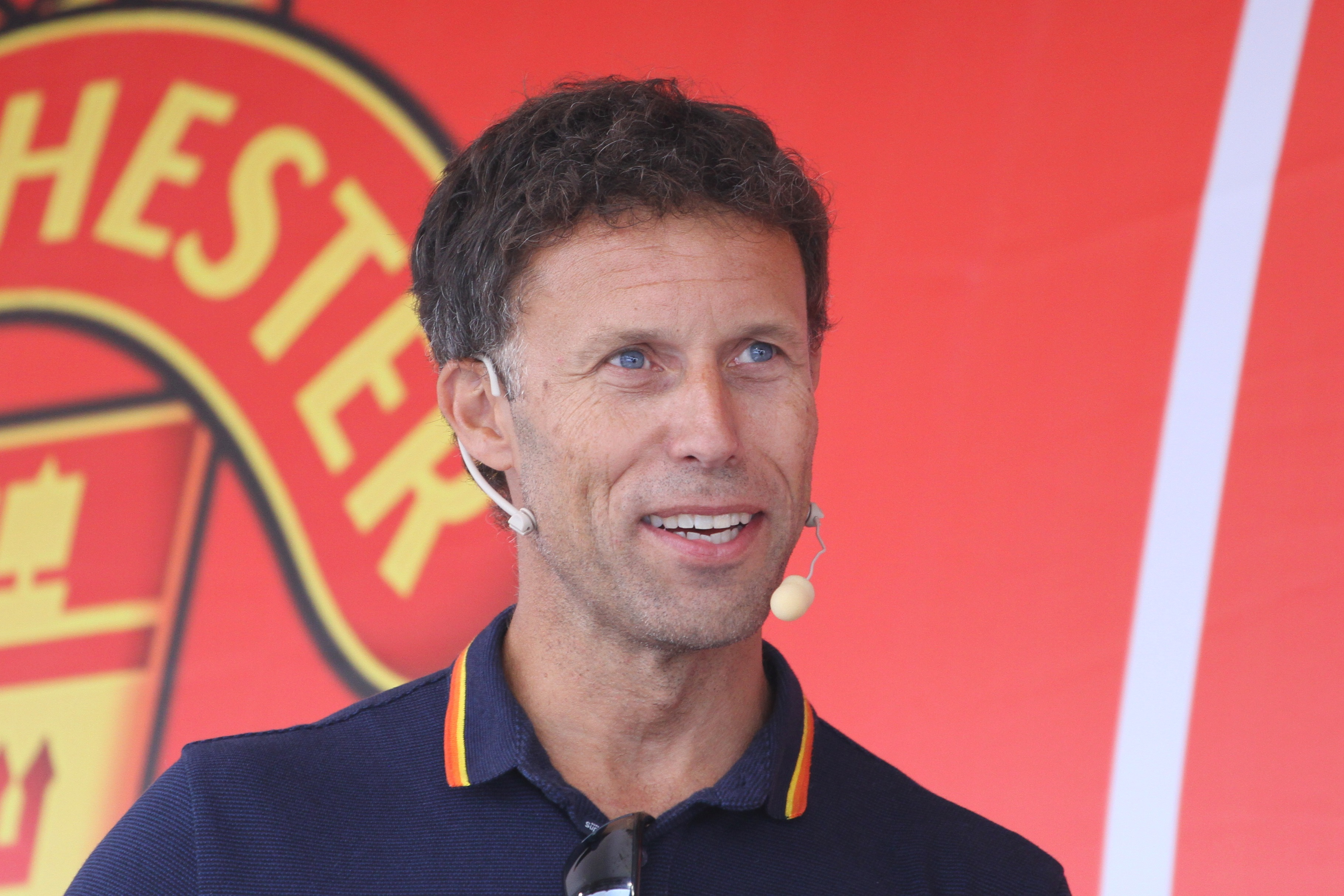
Ronny Johnsen, 2017

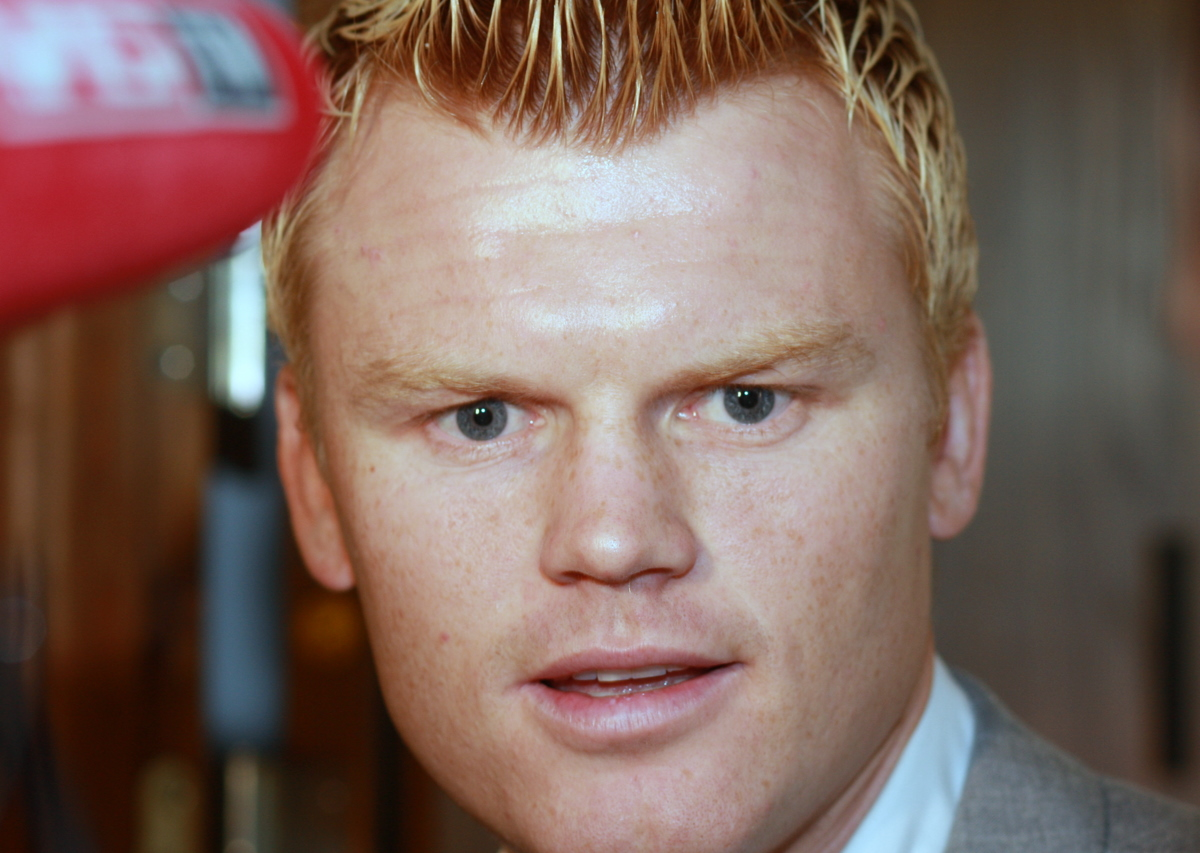
John Arne Riise, 2009

=== Sport ===
- Hjalmar Andersen (1923–2013), a speed skater who won three gold medals at the 1952 Winter Olympics
- Ronny Johnsen (born 1969), a former footballer with Manchester United F.C. who has 384 club caps and 62 with Norway, lives in Tønsberg
- Linda Cerup-Simonsen (born 1969), a sailor and team gold medallist at the 1992 Summer Olympics
- Anders Aukland (born 1972), a cross-country skier and team gold medallist, 2002 Winter Olympics
- Rune Monstad (born 1973) known as The Viking Biker, a Norwegian cyclist who cycled around the world on a 27-speed Gekko mountain bike from 2005 to 2010
- Morten Hagen (born 1974), a professional golfer
- Kristine Duvholt Havnås (born 1974), a former Norwegian team handballer, team silver medallist at the 1992 Summer Olympics, and team bronze medallist at the 2000 Summer Olympics
- Tonje Larsen (born 1975), a retired Norwegian Olympic team champion handballer
- Olaf Tufte (born 1976), a rower, firefighter, and farmer who won four Olympic medals
- John Arne Riise (born 1980), a former footballer with Liverpool F.C. who has 546 club caps and 110 with Norway, lives in Tønsberg
- Espen Bugge Pettersen (born 1980), a former football goalkeeper with 440 club caps
- Lisa-Marie Woods (born 1984), a professional football midfielder
- Kjetil Borch (born 1990), a world rowing champion and two-time Olympic medallist
- Magnus Carlsen (born 1990), a chess grandmaster and former World Chess Champion
- Anine Rabe (born 1992), a former figure skater
- Ali Srour (born 1994), a Lebanese professional boxer

== Gallery ==
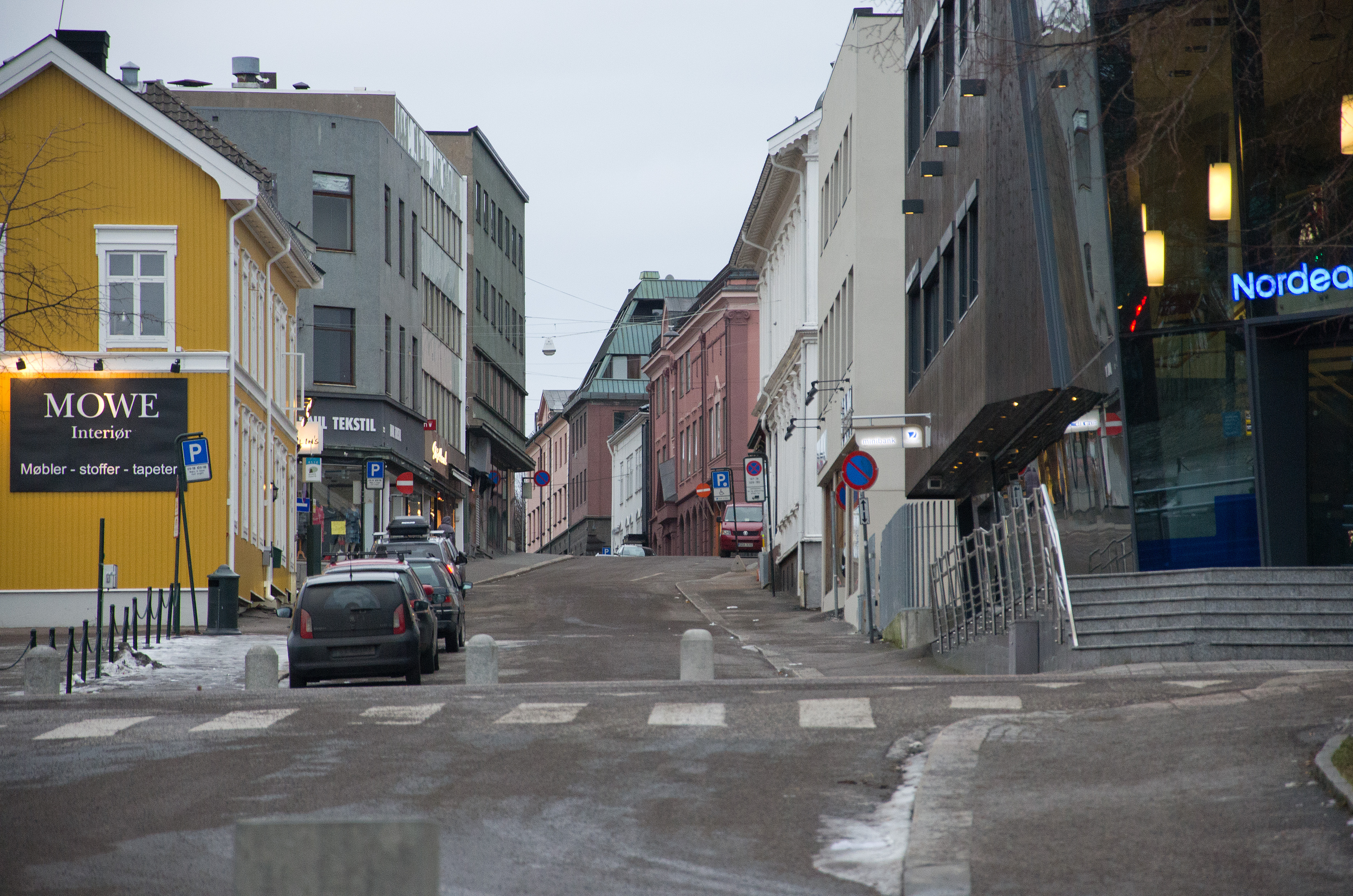
Møllers Gaten

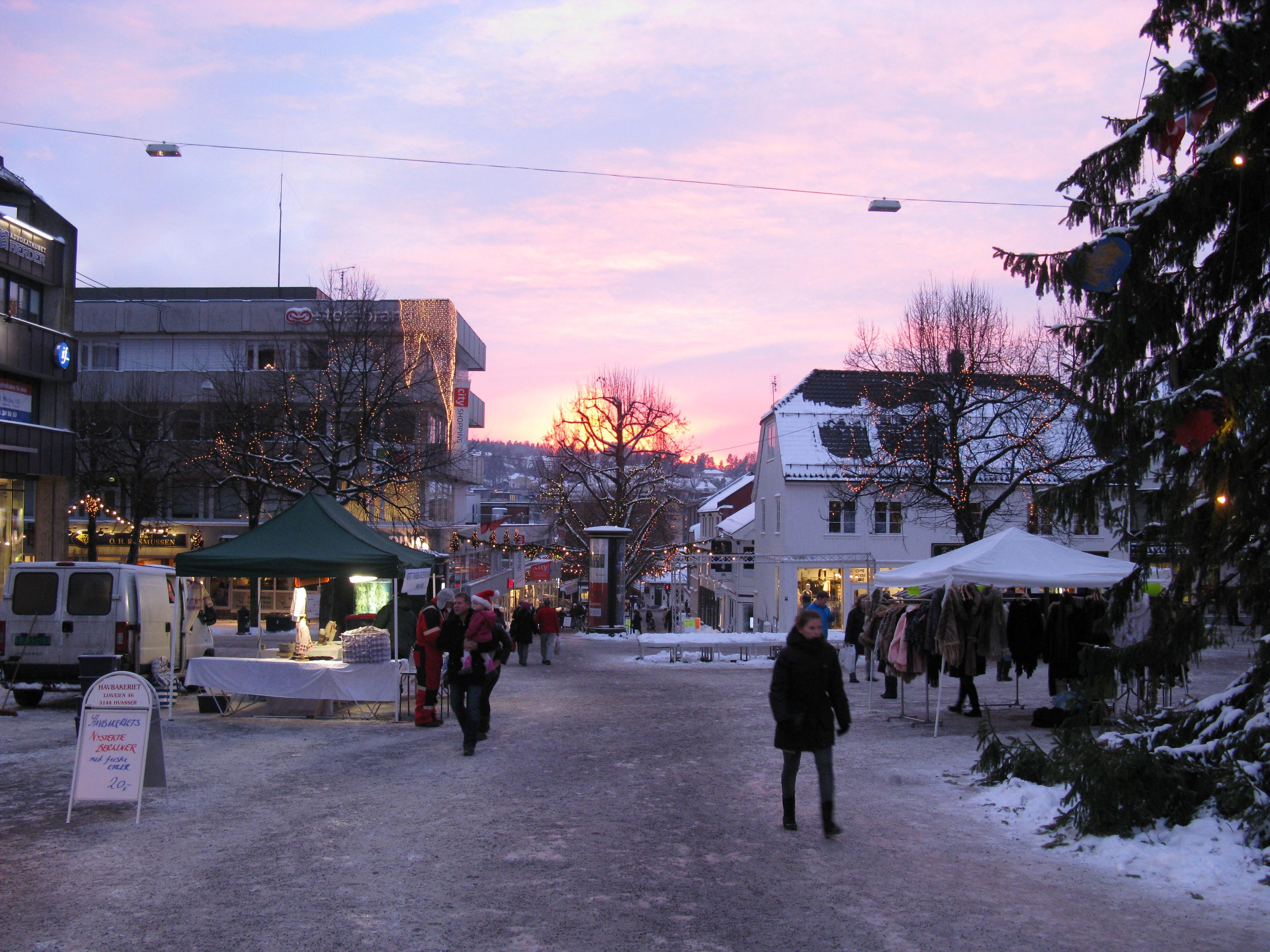
Tønsberg during winter

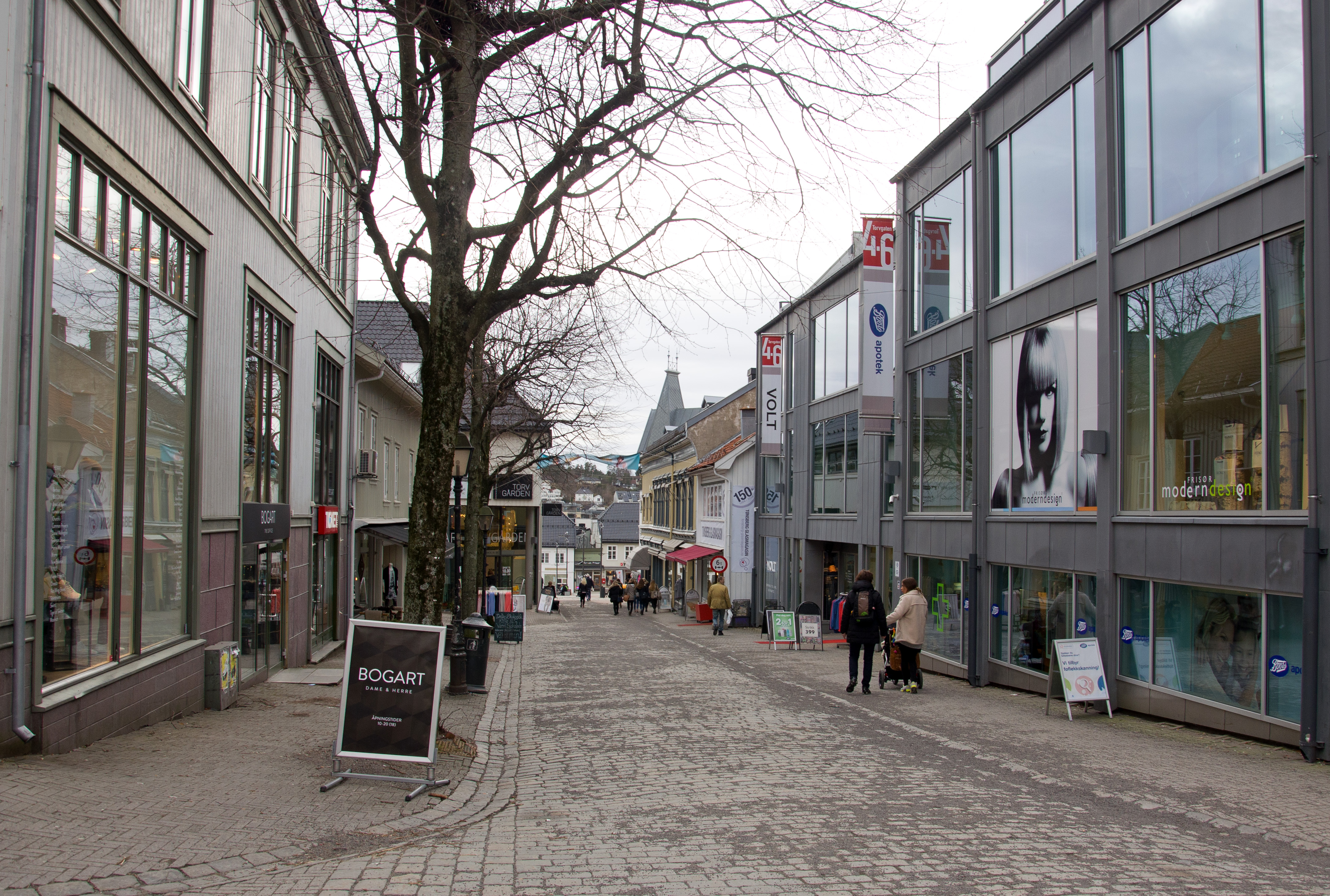
Torvgaten in the city centre

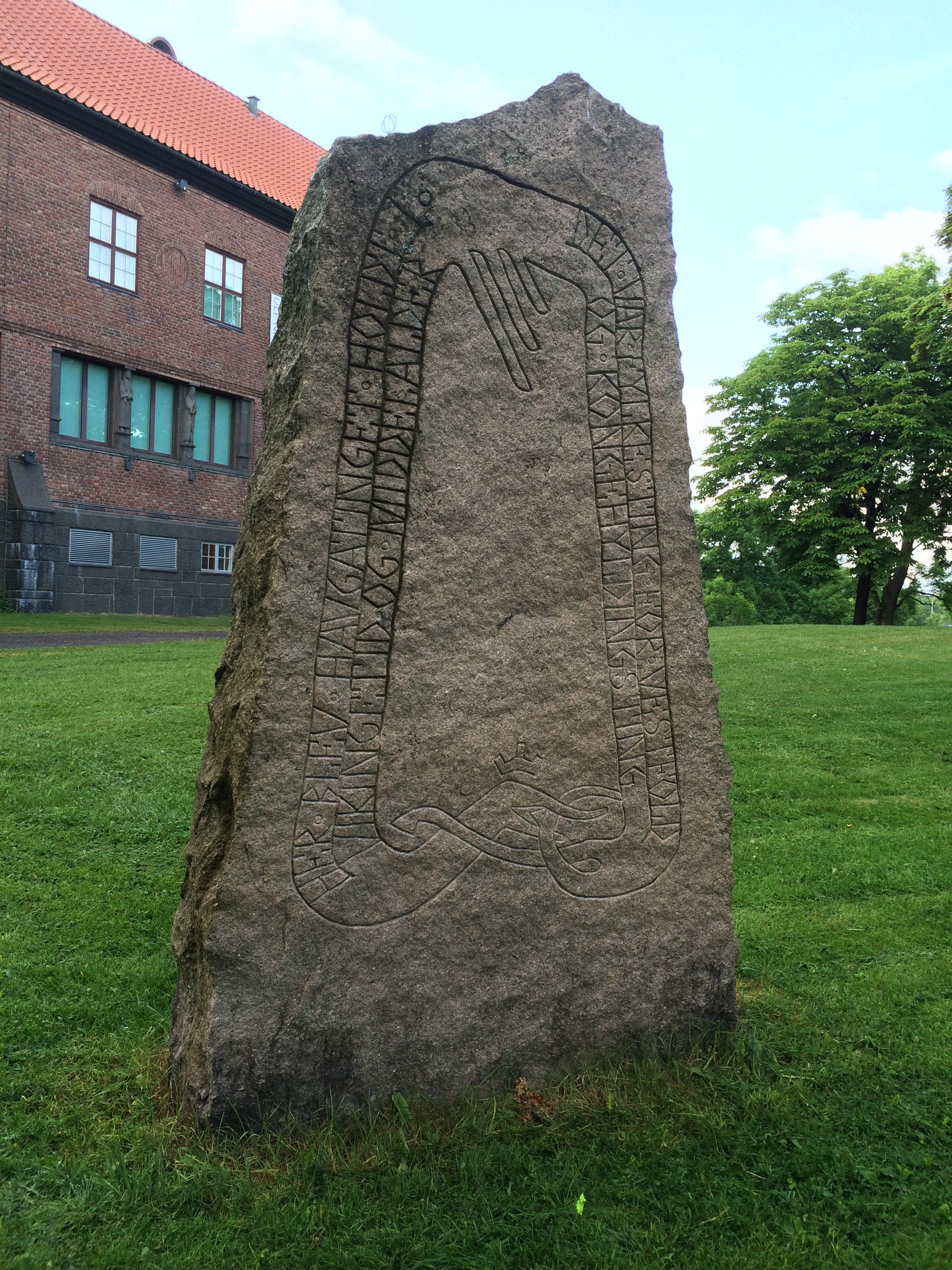
Haugar Art Museum

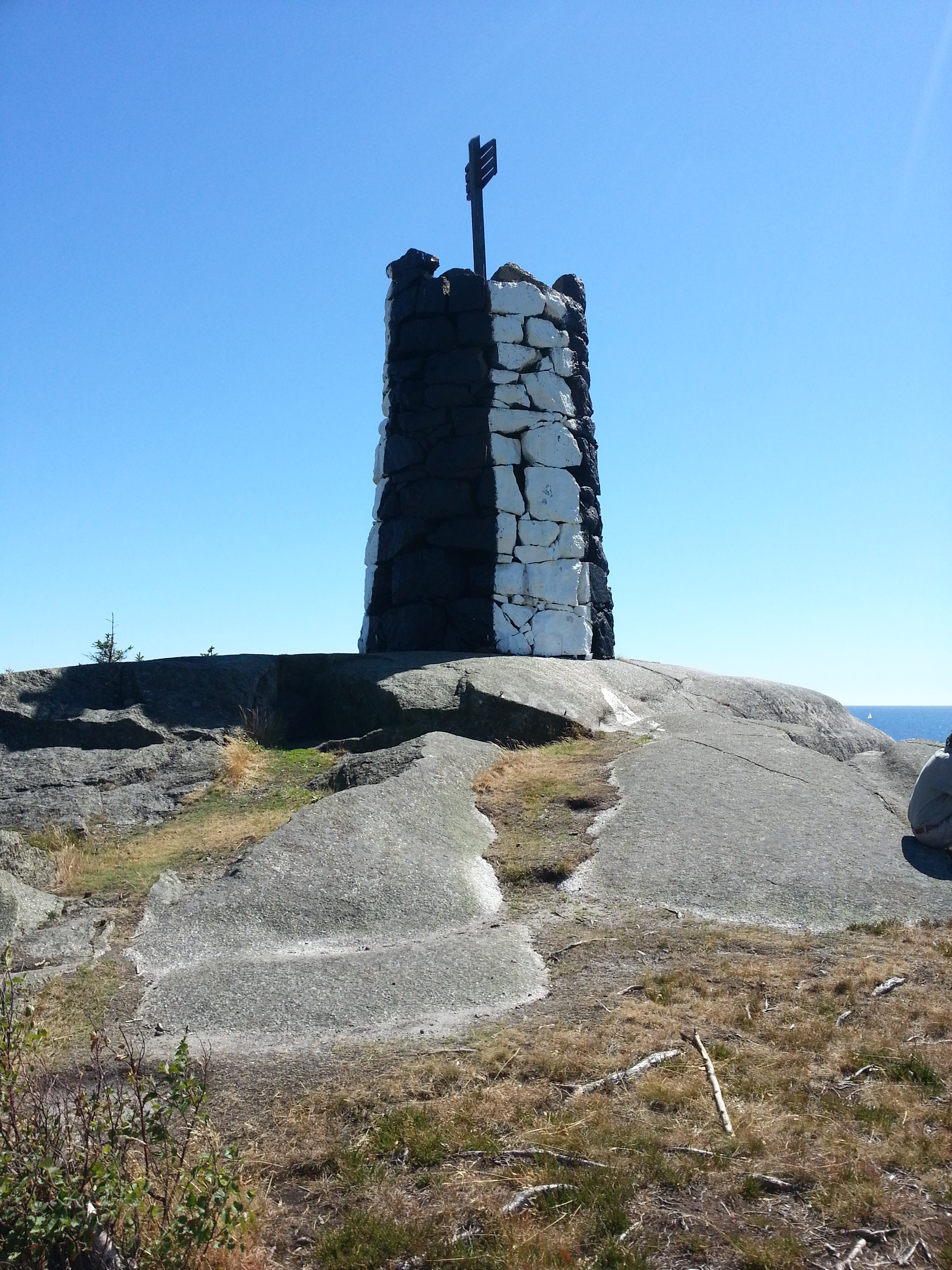
Tønsberg Barrel on East Island in Sandefjord

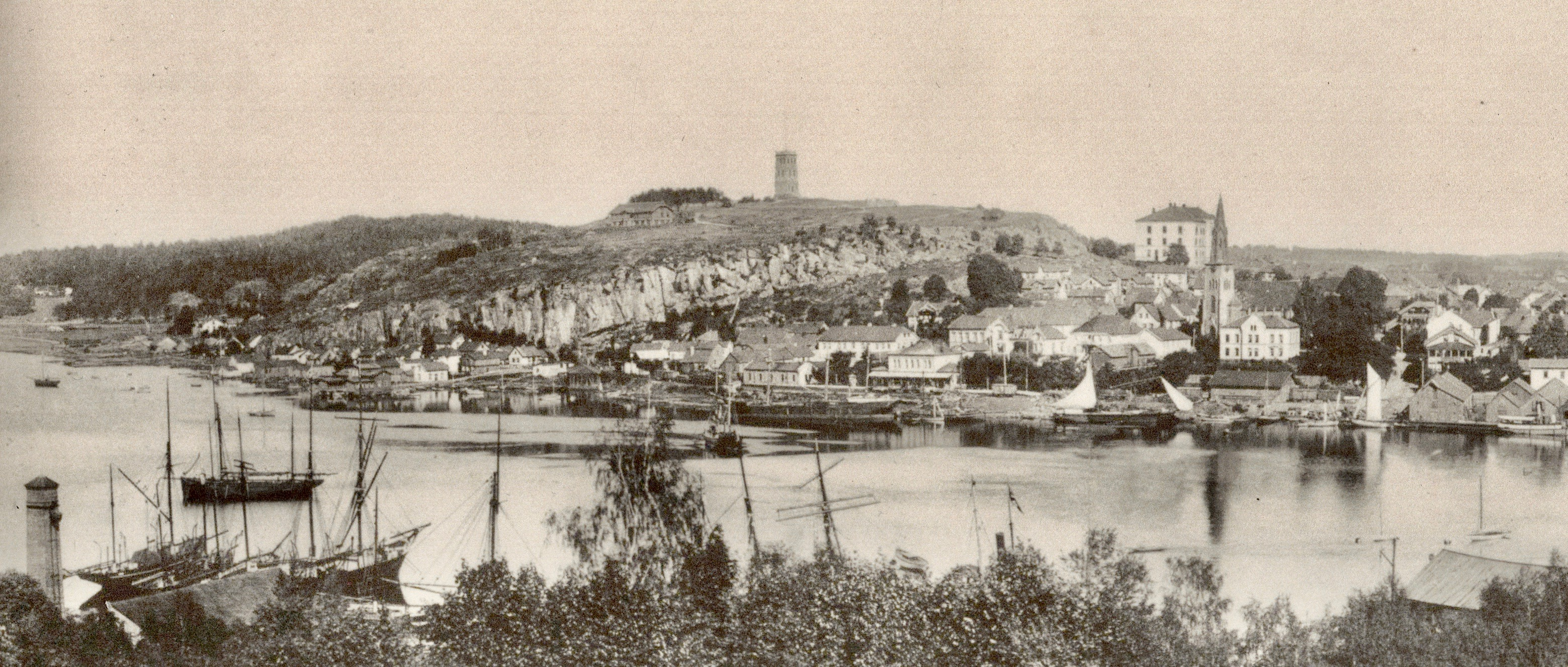
Tønsberg in January 1908

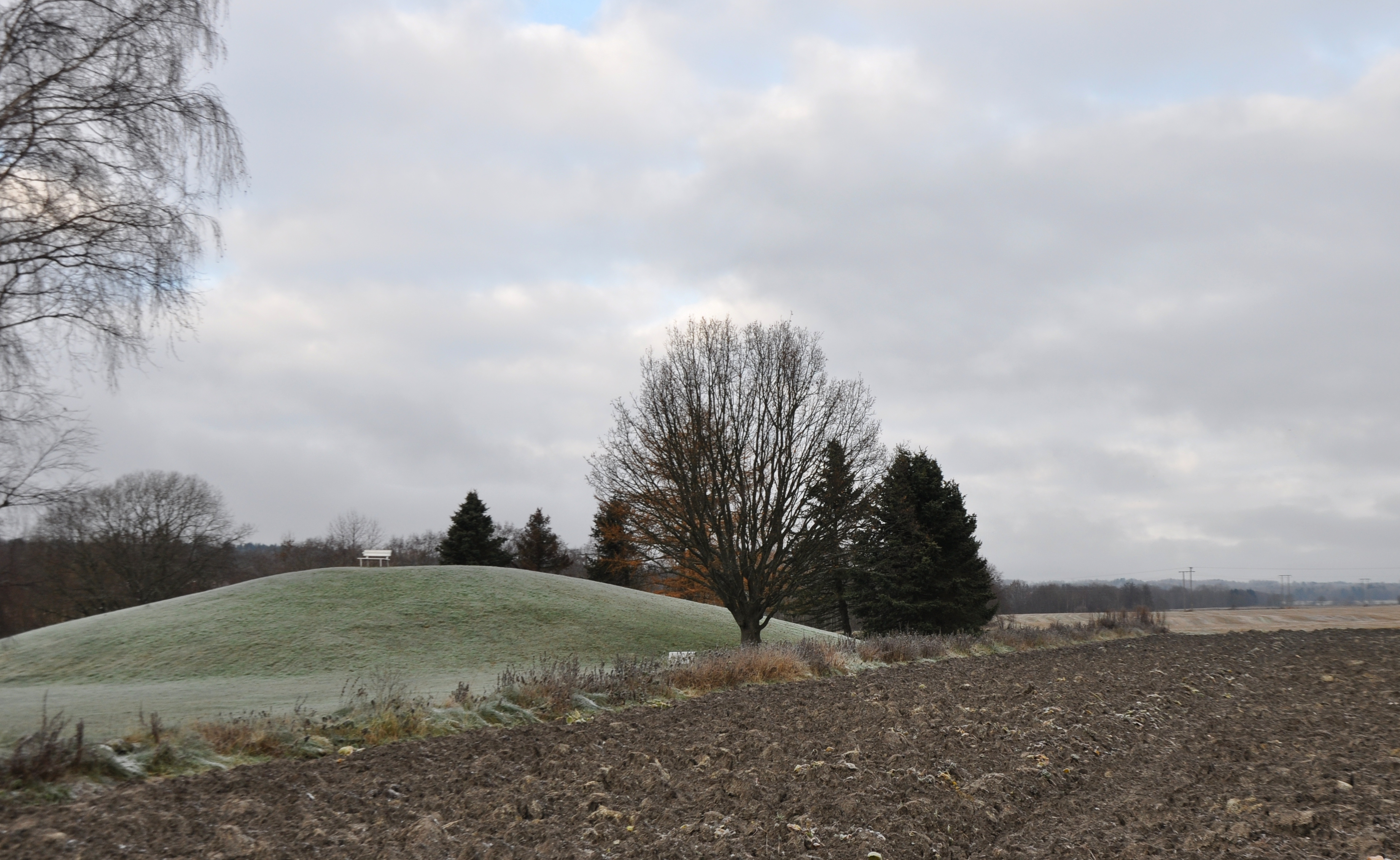
Oseberg Mound, where the 9th century 22-metre Oseberg Ship was discovered
