= Johan Henrik Dietrichs =

Norwegian merchant and politician

Johan Henrik Dietrichs (2 June 1809 – 4 August 1886) was a Norwegian merchant and politician.

Dietrichs was a merchant in Tønsberg, where he also served as mayor and as a member of City Council. He was elected to the Norwegian Parliament in 1848, 1854, 1857 and 1859, representing the constituency of Tønsberg (Tønsberg og Holmestrand in 1854).
