= Niels Johan Føyn =

Norwegian meteorologist

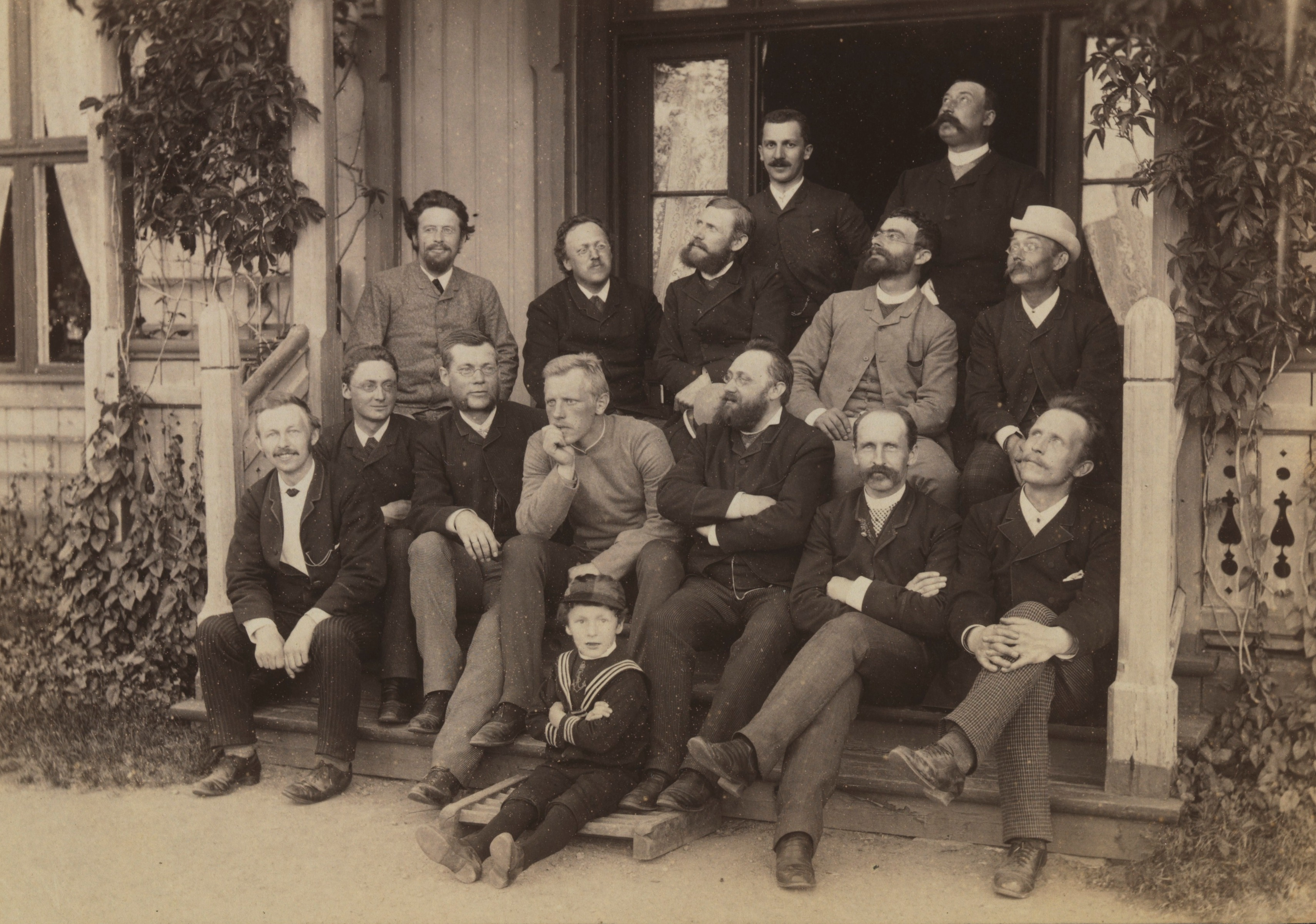
- Second row, first on the left: Niels Føyn
- Born: Niels Johan Nielsen; February 23, 1860; Slagen, Tønsberg, Norway
- Died: June 13, 1945 (aged 85)
- Occupation: Meteorologist

Niels Johan Føyn (February 23, 1860 – June 13, 1945), original surname Nielsen, was a Norwegian meteorologist.

Føyn was born in Slagen in the municipality of Tønsberg, Norway. He was the son of the ship operator Peder Nielsen (1818–1904) and he later adopted the surname Føyn from the name of the farm where his family lived. He received his candidatus realium degree in 1886 and then worked as an assistant at the Norwegian Meteorological Institute. He received a state scholarship to study in Berlin and Vienna from 1893 to 1895. From 1903 to 1915, Føyn was the supervisor of the Bergen Meteorological Observatory, and from 1915 to 1928 he was the deputy director of the Norwegian Meteorological Institute. He was made a member of the Norwegian Academy of Science and Letters in 1904.

== Legacy ==
In meteorology, a Köppen-like formula known as Føyn's formula is used for calculating monthly mean temperatures:

T_{m} = T_{g} + k(T_{2} − T_{g})

where T_{m} = monthly mean temperature, T_{g} = monthly mean of T_{1} (morning temperature) and T_{3} (evening temperature), k = constant, and T_{2} = midday temperature.

== Selected works ==
- "Meteorologi" (Meteorology; as N. J. Nielsen, in Henrik Jæger (ed.), Illustreret norsk literaturhistorie, 1896)
- Wolken-Beobachtungen inn Norwegen 1896–97 (Cloud Observations in Norway 1896–97; 1900)
- "Abhängigkeit des Barometerstandes von den Terrainverhältnissen" (Dependence of Barometer Readings on Terrain Conditions; in Meteorologische Zeitschrift, 1910)
- "Das Klima von Bergen, I. Niederschläge" (The Climate Of Bergen. Part 1: Precipitation; in Bergens Museums aarbok, 1910), "II. Lufttemperatur" (Part 2: Air Temperature; ibid., 1916)
- "Norges Klima" (Norway's Climate; in Norge 1814–1914, 1915)
- "Klima von Nordwesteuropa und den Inseln von Island bis Franz-Josef-Land" (The Climate of Northwest Europe and the Islands from Iceland to Franz Josef Land; coauthored with Bernt Johannes Birkeland, in Handbuch der Klimatologie, vol. 3, 1932)
