= Cecilie Christine Schøller =

Norwegian land owner and socialite (1720–1786)

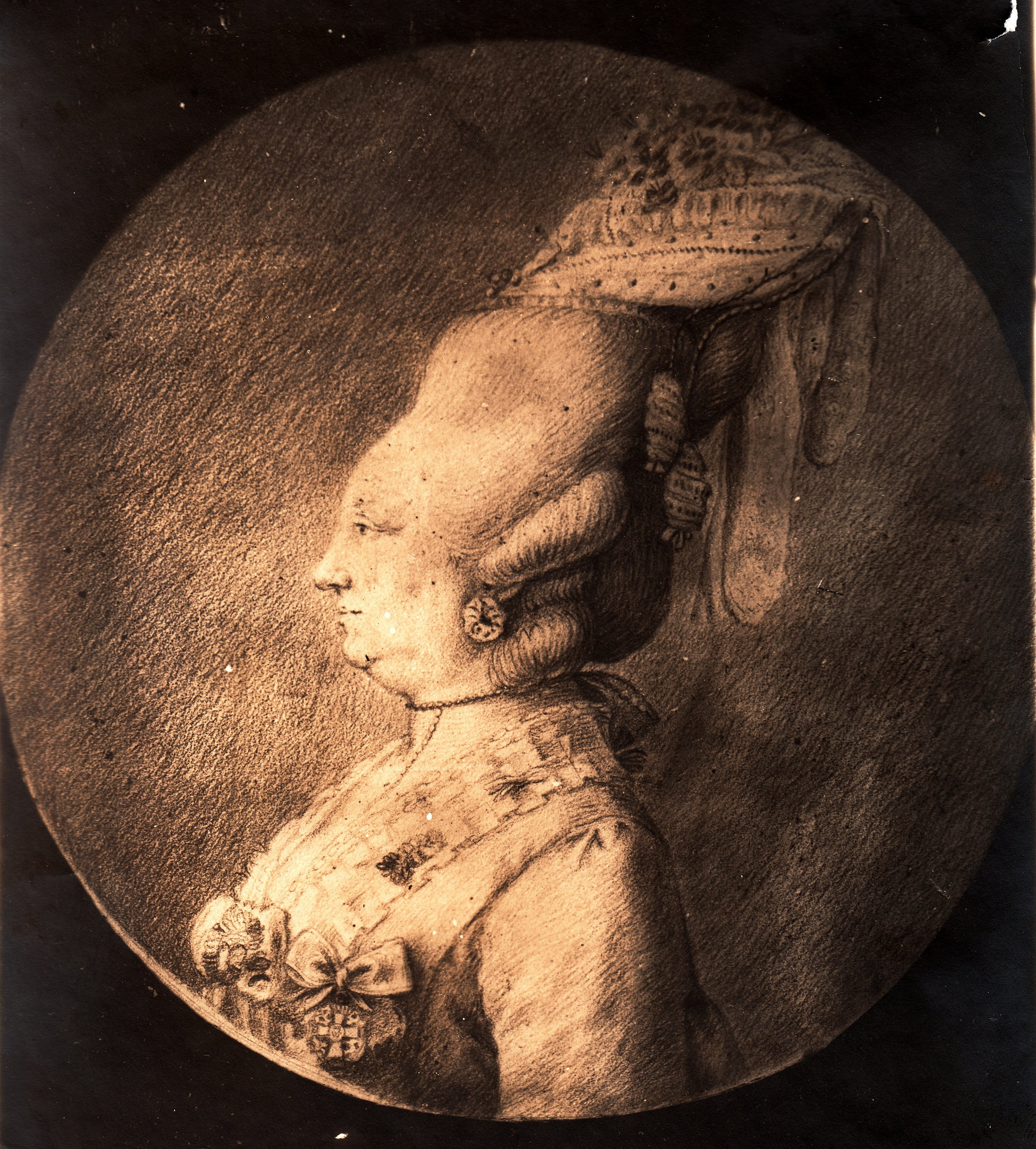
Cecilie Christine Schøller

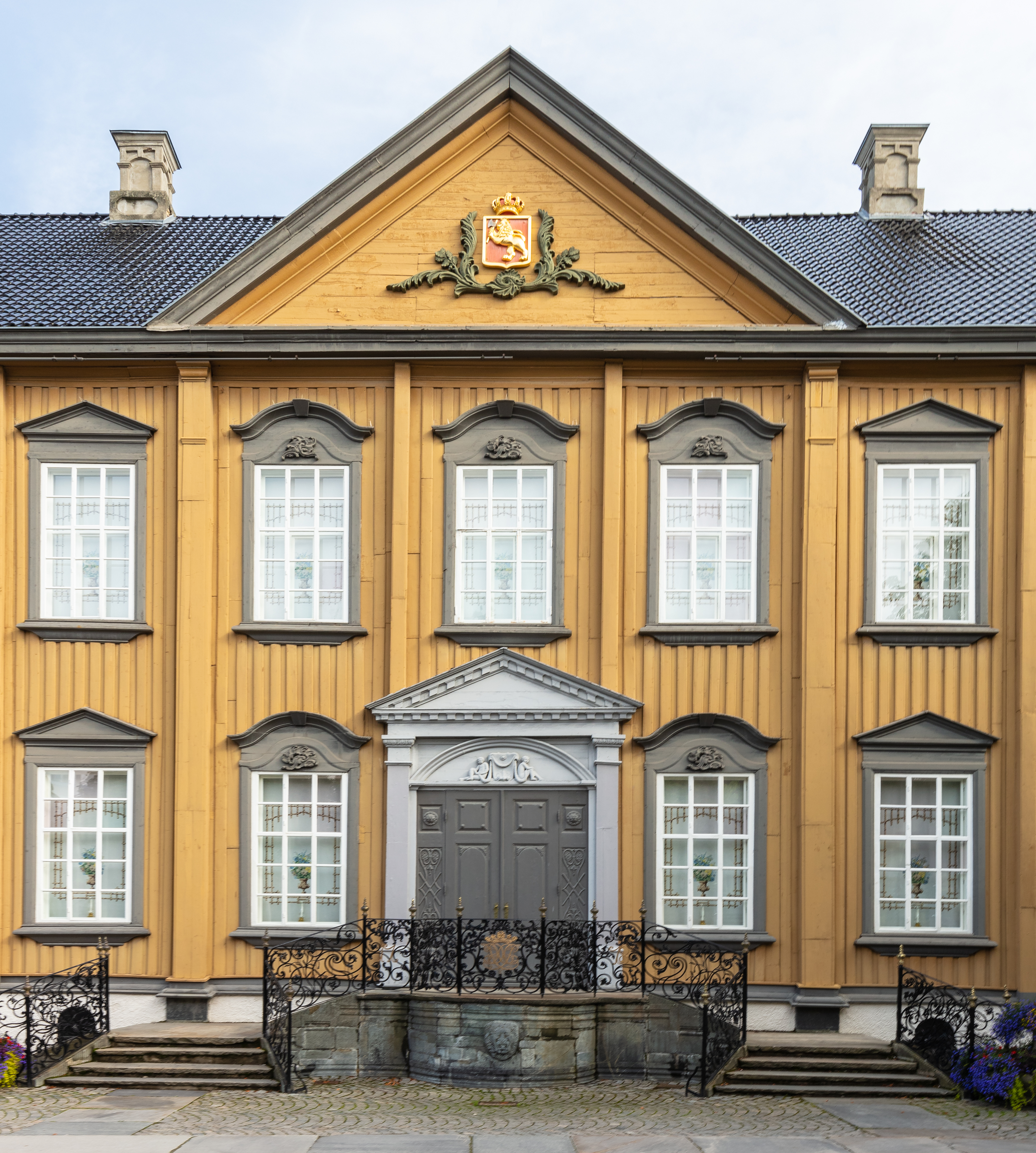
Stiftsgården, Trondheim

Cecilie Christine Schøller, born Sidsel Kirstine Frølich (16 March 1720 – 19 April 1786), was a Norwegian socialite, land owner and businessperson. She was builder and owner of Stiftsgården, now the royal residence in Trondheim, Norway.

== Biography ==
She was born in Tønsberg to Johan Frederik Frølich (1681–1757) and Hilleborg von Wettberg. Her father had Prussian roots, while her mother had Danish and German origin. The family moved to Trondheim in 1740 when Johan Frederik Frølich became commanding general for Nordenfjells, the northern half of Norway. In 1742 she married the wealthy chamberlain and merchant Stie Tønsberg Schøller (1700–1769). He became county governor (stiftamtmann) in Trondheim and also a member of the Royal Norwegian Society of Sciences and Letters from 1766 to his death in 1769.

Cecilie Christine Schøller continued her husband's business after his death. She continued his extensive business interests, including the sawmill at Leira near Nidelva. She inherited her parents's farm at Munkegata in 1771 and bought several of the neighbouring properties. In 1774–1776, she built the largest wooden palace in Scandinavia, Stiftsgården in Trondheim, which has been the official royal residence in Trondheim since 1800. She was also a financier and benefactor of the Royal Norwegian Society of Sciences and Letter, and regarded as an important representative of the cultural golden age in Trondheim during the 18th century.

She was made Dame de L'union parfaite in 1769, and given the title Councilor (geheimerådinne) in 1776: this was the highest title ever given a non noble Norwegian woman, and the first time the title was given a woman at all in her own right. She moved permanently to Copenhagen in 1783 and died there in 1786. She is buried at Assistens Cemetery.

== Other sources ==
- Andersen, Eystein M.(2006) Stiftsgården - Det kongelige palé i Trondheim (Andrimne Forlag: Oslo) ISBN 82-92546-10-3
