= Stiftsgården =

Coordinates: 63°25′54″N 10°23′42″E

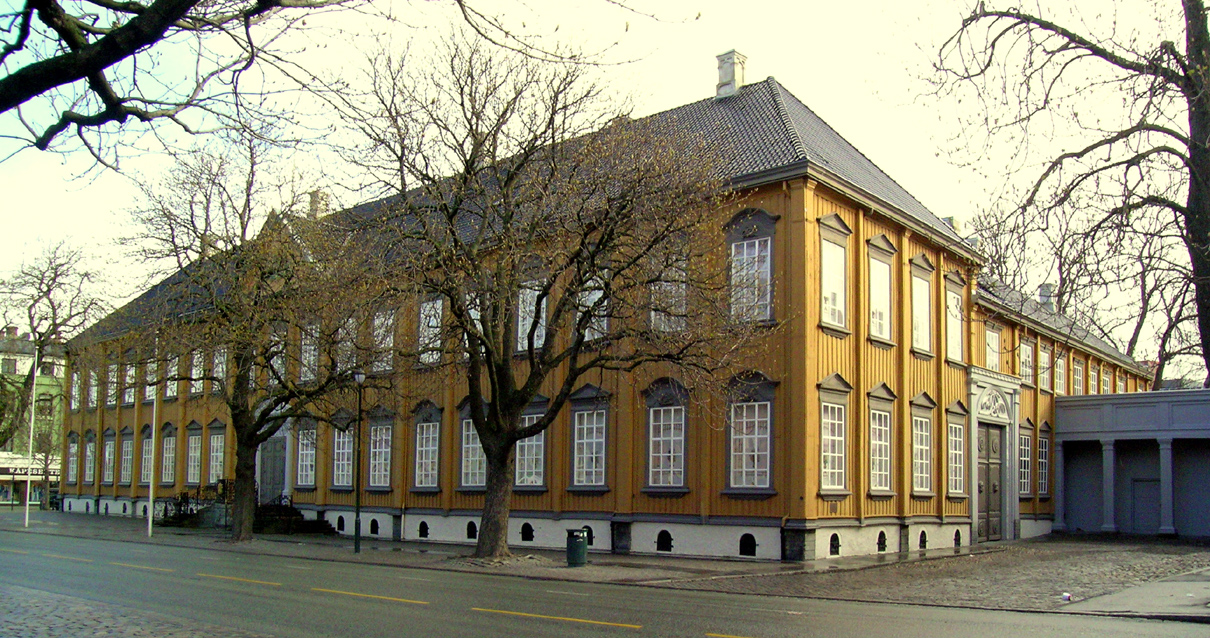
- Stiftsgården
- Interactive map of the Stiftsgården area

General information
- Architectural style: Baroque, with elements of Rococo and neoclassicism.
- Location: Trondheim, Norway
- Construction started: 1774
- Completed: 1778
- Client: Cecilie Christine Schøller

Design and construction
- Architect: Probably Christian Lerche

Stiftsgården is the royal residence in Trondheim, Norway. It is centrally situated on the city’s most important thoroughfare, Munkegaten. At 140 rooms constituting 4000 m² (43000 ft²), it is one of the largest wooden buildings in Northern Europe, and it has been used by royalty and their guests since 1800.

== History ==
The palace was built in 1774–1778 for Cecilie Christine Schøller (1720–1786), the wealthy widow of Stie Tønsberg Schøller (1700–1769), chamberlain and merchant in Trondheim. Through her mother she was descended from some of the most prominent noble families in Denmark. From her father, the army commander in chief of central Norway, she inherited a large property in the city centre. When she inherited her husband's large fortune, she commenced the construction of the largest private townhouse in Trondheim. In 1777 she was given the title of a privy counselor. She is a representative of the cultural and commercial growth that Trondheim experienced in the late 18th century, and of the city's strong women in that period. She often traveled abroad and seldom used the palace herself before she died in Copenhagen in 1786. The palace was constructed on the grounds of the former residence of her father, General Johan Friderich Frølich (1681–1757).

During her absence abroad, her son-in-law General Georg Frederik von Krogh (1732-1818) resided in the building. After her death, it was inherited by his son, Mrs. Schøller's grandson, and the General remained in residence there until it was sold to the state in 1800 for 10,000 rigsdaler. It was then used by the governor of the region, as law courts, and as a royal residence when the royal family visited Trondheim. The building also had several other functions; it housed the Bank of Norway in the period 1816–1819. In 1906 the palace became exclusively the royal residence in Trondheim.

Prominent guests resided there when in Trondheim. Thus, this location has been the place of residence in Trondheim for the Norwegian royal family since 1804. The first royal persons ever to visit the present building were Crown Prince Frederik of Denmark-Norway, Prince Carl and Prince Frederick of Hesse, who were the guests of General von Krogh in 1788.

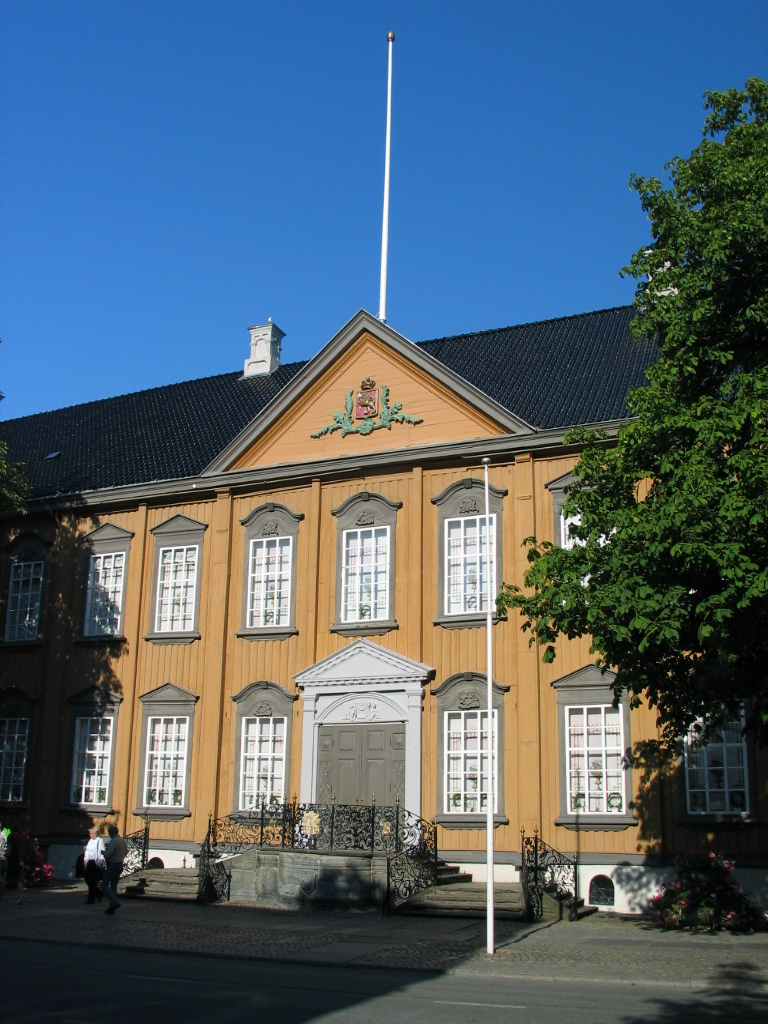
Main front entrance

== Historic events ==
Stiftsgården has been the setting for the main festivities during the following coronations:

- King Carl III Johan, 1818
- King Carl IV and Queen Louise, 1860
- King Oscar II and Queen Sofie, 1873
- King Haakon VII and Queen Maud, 1906

as well as during the following benedictions:

- King Olav V, 1958
- King Harald V and Queen Sonja, 1991

Stiftsgården has also been the setting for many other royal visits—among others, the visits of the Norwegian regent and first king of independent Norway, Crown Prince Christian Frederik in 1814, King Carl III Johan in 1835, Crown Prince Carl in 1856, and in recent times King Harald V and Queen Sonja's 60th birthdays in 1997 and Princess Märtha Louise's wedding in 2002.

== Building ==
The architect of the building is not identified with certainty but is assumed to have been Mrs. Schøller's cousin, Admiral Christian Lerche (1712–93). Many of the artisans and artists responsible for the interior decorations are also unknown. The palace is built in the Baroque style but has elements of Rococo and neoclassicism. It has around 140 rooms constituting 4000 m² (43000 ft²) and is probably the largest wooden palace in Northern Europe. A large part of the garden was separated as a public park in 1906. It was originally laid out in the Baroque style and contained both an orangery and an arbor.

The exterior is mostly in its original form. In 1841 some of the dormer windows were removed after a small fire, but those on the garden side are still in place. The orchestra annex by the ballroom was built for the planned coronation of King Oscar I in 1847. The original quarter-pane windows were replaced in 1860. However, some of the original windows are still in place in the southern wing on the garden side.

Unlike the exterior, the interior has changed significantly. The interior of the side wings has been extensively rearranged, and all the rooms in the building have been renovated several times. However, some original features are still present. The Rococo style stucco work was preserved on some of the ceilings and around the wall niches. The overdoors are decorated with painted landscapes. Several of the original wall decorations are preserved, some with chinoiseries. In the dining room, one can see paintings of cityscapes made after contemporary English copper engravings. The ceiling and the overdoors in the ballroom were painted in 1847, probably using drawings by architect Heinrich Ernst Schirmer who worked with the interiors at the Royal Palace, Oslo. The painted floors and ceilings in the other rooms are mostly from 1847 as well. The interior of the Queen's salon was designed for the coronation in 1906 by architect Ingvald Alstad.

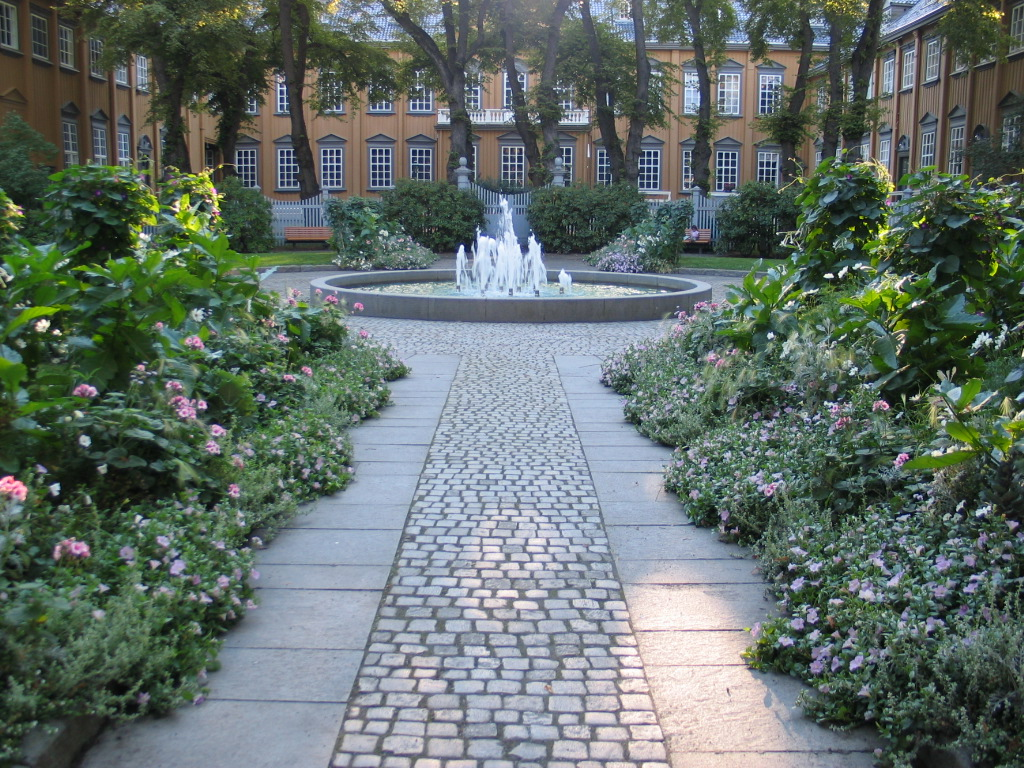
Courtyard and back park

== Furnishings ==
Very few furnishings from the 18th century have been preserved, except two Rococo-style stoves from 1768. All the furniture was acquired in the 19th century and later. Most of it was acquired for the planned coronation of King Oscar I and Queen Josephine in the 1840s and the coronation of Haakon VII and Queen Maud in 1906. The many pieces of Biedermeier furniture were made in Trondheim in the 1840s. The Hepplewhite-style furniture in the Chinese Cabinet was acquired in Paris for the coronation in 1906. The King's Study is furnished with a set of Chippendale-style furniture designed by architect Axel Guldahl and crafted by cabinet maker A. Kvenild for the same occasion. The furniture of the Queen's salon was created in the Louis XVI style by Edvard Røhmen in Trondheim.

== Other sources ==
- Andersen, Eystein M.(2006) Stiftsgården - Det kongelige palé i Trondheim (Andrimne Forlag, Oslo) ISBN 82-92546-10-3.
- Rognerød, Dag-Ivar(1997) På historisk grunn - En kulturhistorisk reise til statlige eiendommer (Orfeus Forlag, Oslo) ISBN 82-467-0011-1.
