= Jakob Friis =

Norwegian journalist, publicist, historian and archivist

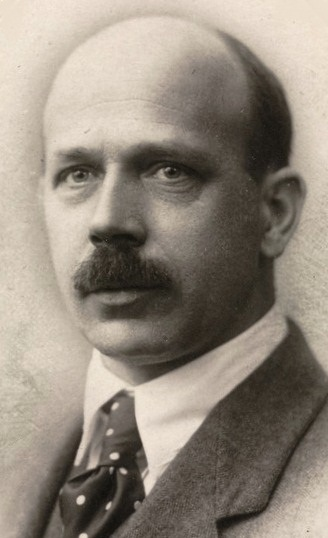
Jakob Friis ca. 1930. Byhistorisk samling, Oslo Museum.

Jakob Johan Sigfrid Friis (27 April 1883 – 12 December 1956) was a Norwegian journalist, publicist, historian, and archivist. He was a newspaper editor and member of the Norwegian Parliament.

== Biography ==
Jakob Friis was born in Røros in Sør-Trøndelag as the son of Jakob Pavels Friis (1827–1912) and Johanne Berg (1850–1924). He graduated cand.philol. degree in history from the University of Oslo in 1909.

Friis spoke English, French, German and Russian fluently and spent his professional career as a journalist and a state archivist. He was a journalist in Socialdemokraten from 1909 to 1912, Ny Tid from 1915 to 1917, Arbeiderbladet from 1917 to 1924 and Norges Kommunistblad from 1928 to 1929. Upon the suggestion from Martin Tranmæl, he became editor-in-chief of Rjukan Arbeiderblad from 1925 to 1928 and the working class encyclopedia Arbeidernes Leksikon from 1930 to 1936. He worked in the National Archives (Riksarkivet) from 1912 to 1915, followed by the regional state archives: in Trondhjem 1915-1917, Kristiania 1917-1922 and Kristiansand 1934-1953.

Friis was a member of the municipal council of Aker Municipality between 1919 and 1922, and a member of the municipal council of Kristiansand Municipality between 1937 and 1940. He chaired the municipal party chapter from 1936 to 1937. Friis represented the Labour Party at the Second and Third Comintern World Congresses; he was also a member of the Executive Committee of the Communist International from 1920 to 1921. Friis became a Communist Party member in 1928. He left the party in 1933, and rejoined the Labour Party in 1936.

After World War II. Friis was elected to the Parliament of Norway from the Market towns of Vest-Agder and Rogaland counties in 1945, and was re-elected after his first period by an overwhelming majority. He was on the left wing of the Labour Party, and was the original editor of the newspaper Orientering in 1952, having published the book Kritikk av norsk utenrikspolitikk etter krigen in 1952. He was one of its chief editors until his death in 1956.

He died in Kristiansand and was buried at Vår Frelsers gravlund in Oslo.

== Selected works ==
- Marcus Thrane (1917)
- Den moderne arbeiderbevegelse i Norge (1918)
- Veien til det sociale demokrati (1918)
- Den internasjonale finanskapitals provinser i Norge (1928)
- Oppgjør med Tyskland og vestmaktene (1945)

== Other sources ==
- "Jakob Friis" (in Norwegian). Storting.
