= Kristian Brinch Koren =

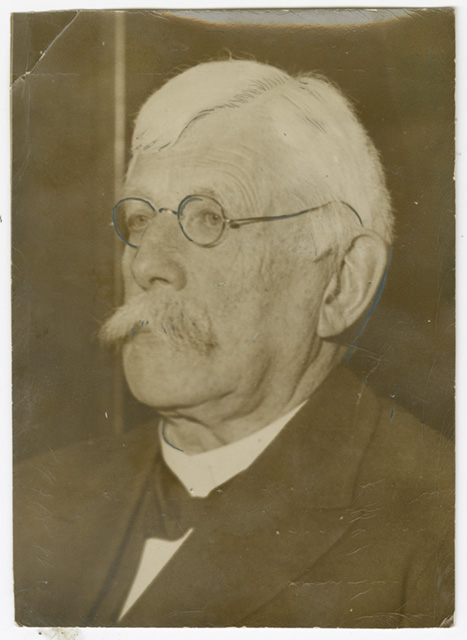
- Born: 23 May 1863; Trondheim, Norway
- Died: 10 February 1938 (aged 74); Oslo, Norway
- Resting place: Cemetery of Our Saviour
- Occupations: Historian, archivist

Kristian Brinch Koren (May 23, 1863 – February 10, 1938) was a Norwegian historian and archivist. He was appointed national archivist of Norway in 1912, serving from 1913 to 1933.

== Early life ==
Koren was born in Trondheim, the son of the senior physician August Laurentius Koren (1833–1929) and Johanne Cathrine Brinch, and the brother of the diplomat Finn Koren (1875–1966). The family left Trondheim in 1867.

== Career ==
Following his examen artium at Oslo Cathedral School in 1881 and his candidatus philologiæ in Kristiania in the fall of 1889, Koren worked as a volunteer apprentice at the university library and a substitute at the National Archives. On February 20, 1891 he was appointed regional state archivist in Trondheim. In 1896 he succeeded Niels Peter Selmer Arentz as librarian at the library of the Royal Norwegian Society of Sciences and Letters. It was Koren that acquired Thorvald Boeck's enormous book collection for the library in 1899. At that time, Boeck's collection was the largest in Norway, consisting of approximately 31,000 volumes.

Koren was appointed national archivist of Norway on December 6, 1912. He assumed the duties on April 2, 1913, when he relocated to Oslo. As the national archivist, he prepared an archive technology program. He arranged to have new buildings created to house the Regional State Archives in Bergen in 1921 and the Regional State Archives in Trondheim in 1927, and also created new regional archives in Hamar in 1917 and in Kristiansand in 1930. Koren persuaded the Storting to approve construction of a new building for the National Archives in 1929.

== Publications ==
- Fortegnelse over filologer, realister og mineraloger ved Norges Universitet 1813–1884 (Record of Philologists, Scientists, and Mineralogists at the University of Norway, 1813–1884), 1885
- Om kilder til Norges historie i middelalderen i engelske arkiver (Sources of Norway's History in the Middle Ages in English Archives), 1893
- Stamtavle over familien Koren, (The Ancestry of the Koren Family) 1898/1903
- Karter og topografiske tegninger vedk. Trondheim og Trøndelag (Maps and Topographical Drawings Related to Trondheim and Trøndelag), 1899
- Trondhjem i gamle dage. Billeder i lystryk (Trondhjem in the Old Days. Phototype Images), 1907
- Hans Nissens og hustrus stiftelse og arbeidshus (Hans Nissen and His Wife's Foundation and Workhouse), 1907
