= Matrikkelutkastet av 1950 =

Norwegian rural real estate listing

The Land Register Draft of 1950 (Matrikkelutkastet av 1950) is a listing containing rural real estate within Norway. Matrikkelutkastet does not contain data for municipalities, but rather contains listings of Norwegian main farms (matrikkelgårder). The farms are sorted by county and municipality or township. Because Matrikkelutkastet contains the names of owners, the archive also can be useful for the individual and family researchers.

The Norwegian Finance Department compiled approximately 85,000 lists of rural real estate in Norway, organized by consecutive, increasing official farm number (gårdsnummer) within each municipality. The database forms a part of the digital Norwegian National Archives. The entire catalogue has been converted by the National Documentation Project of Norway into an electronic text with SGML mark up. The transfer from the manual to the electronic system was completed in 1993. The database is in the Norwegian language.

The land register formed a part of the Norwegian State Name Consultancy Service effort to standardize place names throughout Norway. Responsible for this project section rested with the Department of Scandinavian Studies and Comparative Literature University of Oslo. Matrikkelutkastet av 1950 was never completed, lacking information from the county of Finnmark, which is the reason it is referred to as a draft.
