= Diplomatarium Norvegicum =

Large collection of Norwegian texts

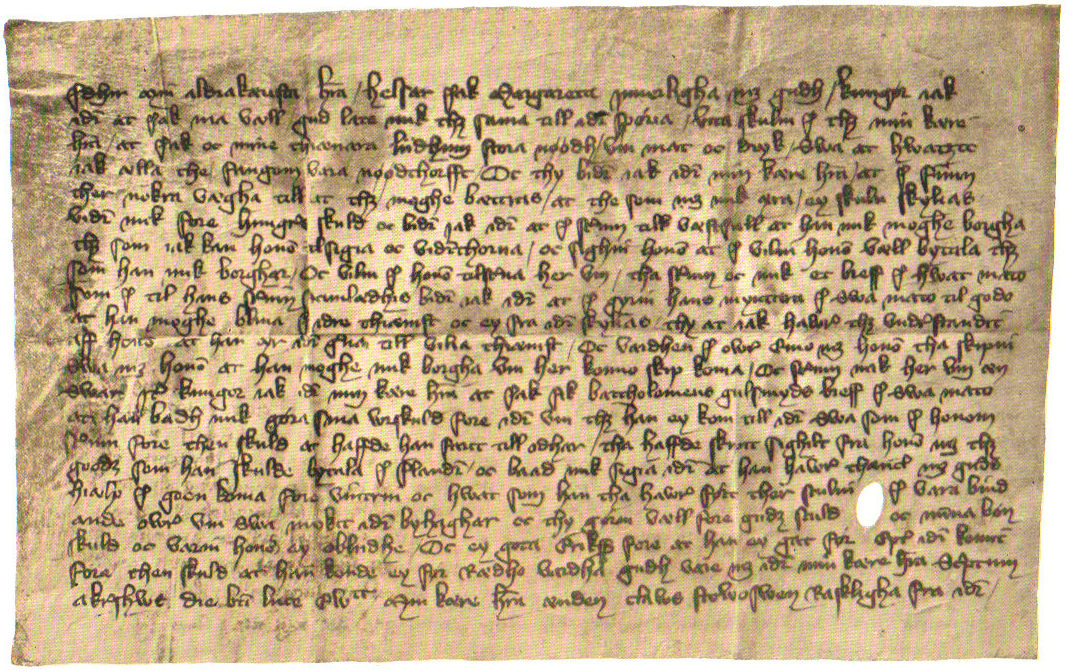
A page from a letter from queen Margaret to king Håkon VI of Norway. DN. I.409

Diplomatarium Norvegicum is a series of books containing the texts of documents and letters from Norway dating from before 1590, verbatim and in the original language. The series consists of 22 volumes, containing the texts of approximately 20,000 documents.

The first volume was published in 1848 at the initiative of historian Christian C. A. Lange (1810–1861), who served as the national archivist of Norway (Riksarkivar). The work of transcribing the sources continued for over a hundred years until 1972. The oldest document is from approximately 1050, but the great mass of documents are from after 1300. The language in most of the letters is Old Norse, Old Norwegian, or Old Danish. Some letters, particularly those connected with the Church or international correspondence are in Latin.

Diplomatarium Norvegicum (commonly abbreviated DN) is an indispensable source for historians of Norwegian medieval history from approximately 1300. The series has also been published as a searchable database on the internet.

== See also ==
- Regesta Norvegica
- Svenskt Diplomatarium
