= Ivar Fonnes =

Norwegian historian and archivist

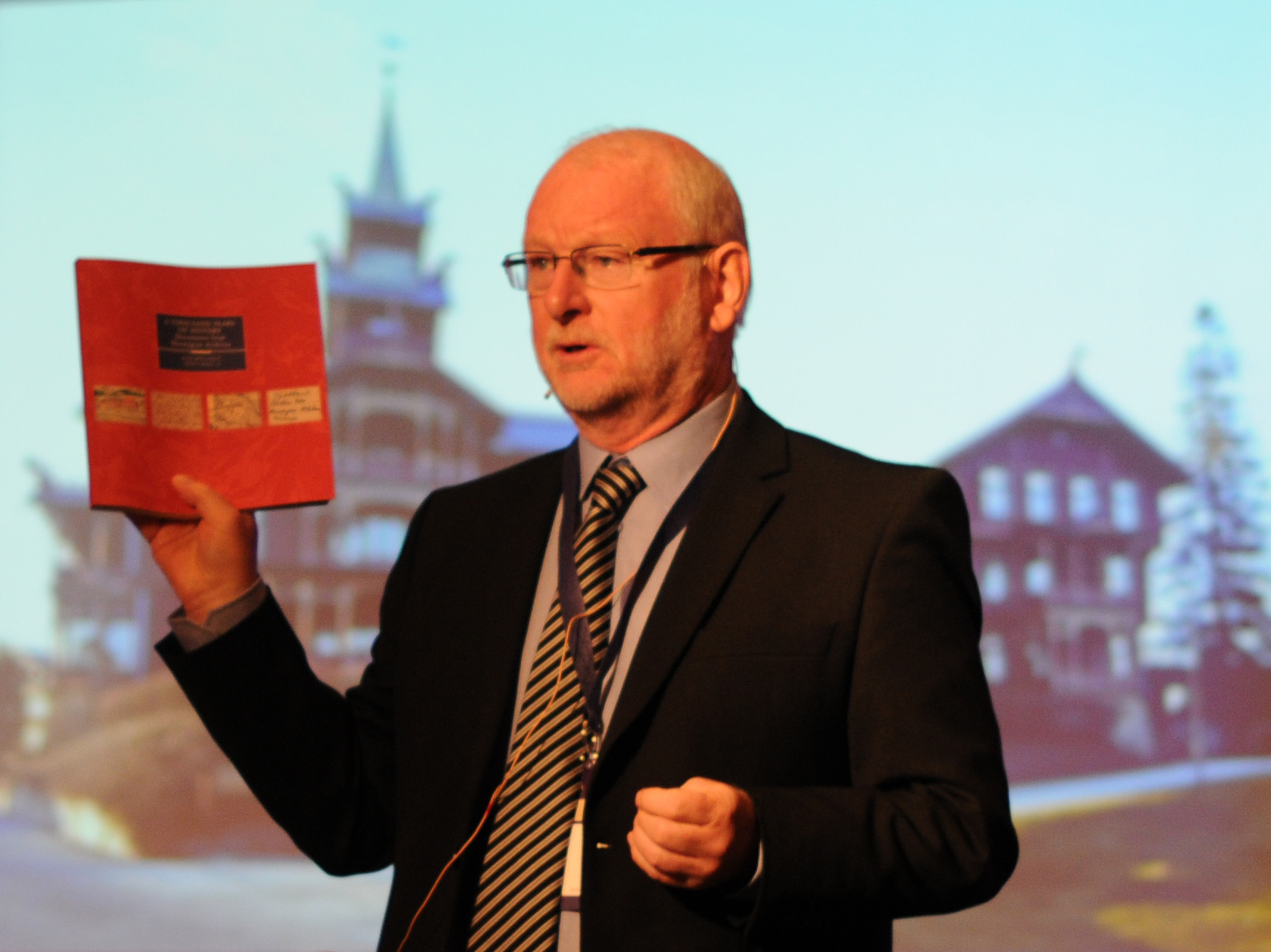
- Born: 24 May 1944 (age 82)
- Education: University of Oslo
- Occupations: Historian and archivist
- Employers: University of Oslo; National Archives of Norway

Ivar Fonnes (born 24 May 1944) is a Norwegian historian, archivist and civil servant. He served as national archivist of Norway from 2006 to 2014.

== Career ==
Fonnes graduated as cand.philol. in history from the University of Oslo in 1972. From 1971 to 1983 he was assigned with the Faculty of History and Philosophy (later renamed the Faculty of Humanities) at the University of Oslo. He was assigned with the National Archives of Norway from 1983, first as head of the IT department, and eventually with various other administrative positions. He was appointed national archivist of Norway in 2006, and held this position until 2014, when Inga Bolstad assumed the position.

Fonnes was also leader of the committee that delivered the Norwegian Official Report 2006: 5 about health archives.

== Selected works ==
- Arkivhåndboken for offentlig forvaltning (2003) ISBN 9788244607377. Second edition (2010) ISBN 9788244612951.
