= Kort Rogge =

Swedish bishop and Renaissance humanist

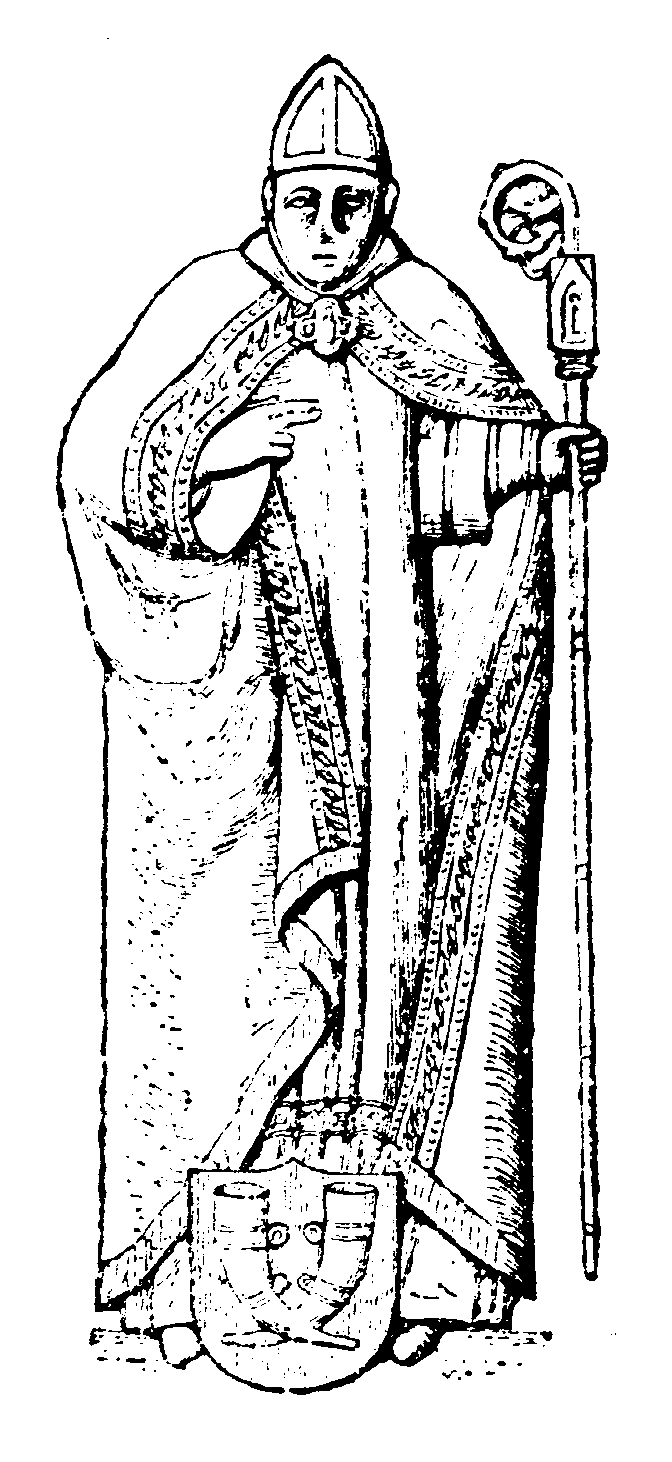
Kort Rogge as depicted on his tombstone in Strängnäs Cathedral

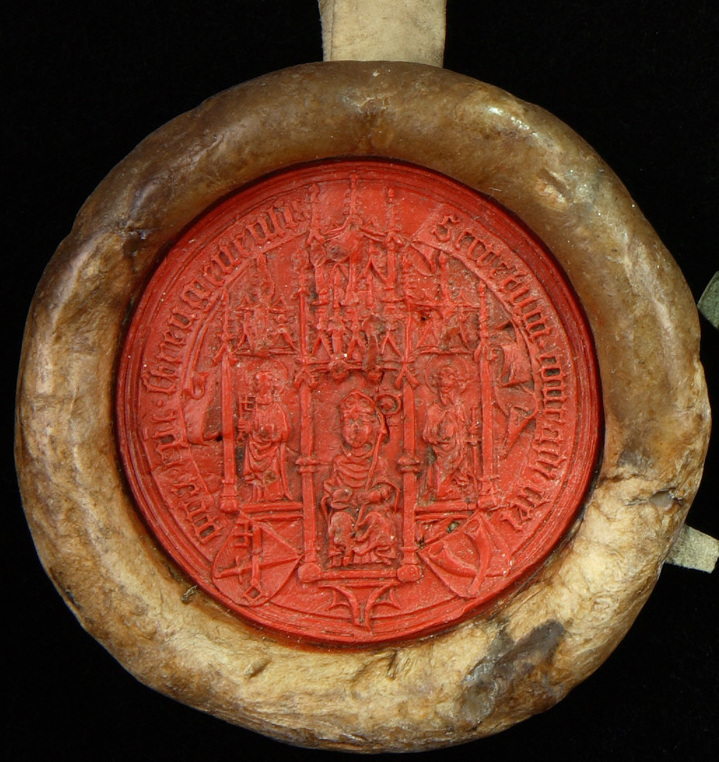
Seal of Kort Rogge

Kort Rogge (c. 1425 — 5 April 1501), also known as Rogge Kyle, Konrad Rogge, Cort Rogge, Conradus Roggo gothus and Conradus Roggo de Holmis, was a Swedish bishop, member of the Privy Council of Sweden, and Renaissance humanist.

== Background and studies ==
The first mention of Kort Rogge's father in archival sources is from 1423. He had moved to Stockholm from Westphalia, and is listed as a master mason in the 1430s. He appears to have maintained close business links to Gdańsk. Kort Rogge's mother Dorotea, née Horn, was a burgher in Stockholm and is mentioned as a house-owner in 1467, more than ten years after her husband's death. Kort Rogge would later refer to himself as a "citizen of Stockholm" and appears to have maintained close ties to his native city throughout his life.

Rogge studied at Leipzig University between 1446 and 1449, and became a canon in Uppsala upon his return. Already in 1450, however, he left Sweden again, to study mainly canon law at the University of Perugia. He received a doctorate in canon law from the university in 1460 and then returned to Sweden.

== Career ==
After his return to Sweden, Rogge entered the chapter of Uppsala Cathedral. During the following decades, he actively, and sometimes with harsh means, sought to promote his own interests and further his career. In 1469, he was chosen by King Charles VIII of Sweden to represent him, together with the chancellor Clas Rytting, at peace negotiations with Denmark in Lübeck. While in Lübeck, he seems to have commissioned an altarpiece for Bälinge Church by Johannes Stenrat. During the 1470s, Rogge systematically increased his engagement with the Diocese of Strängnäs and he was made bishop of the diocese in 1479. As a bishop of Strängnäs, he was also a member of the Privy Council of Sweden. Among his duties within the council was also that of maintaining a rudimentary archive of the state.

Rogge has been described as an "energic" bishop of Strängnäs. He initiated a number of reforms, including the introduction of printed books in the Diocese and several refurbishments and construction works at Strängnäs Cathedral. Under his time in office, large construction works changed the appearance of the cathedral and it still largely retains the look it was given under Rogge's time. He also built a brick residence for the bishop adjacent to the cathedral, today called Roggeborgen. He also undertook construction works at his estate Tynnelsö Castle. Furthermore, he ordered two large altarpieces from the atelier of Jan Borman in Brussels for the cathedral, one of which still constitutes the main altar of the cathedral.

== Humanism ==
Rogge brought with him a book collection from Italy, which was focused on literature, law and history, and from which theological writings were conspicuously absent. He later donated the library to the cathedral, and it is today housed in his former residence in Strängnäs, Roggeborgen. A speech given by Rogge upon his promotion to doctor and preserved to posterity through his manuscript, has been called the first example of Renaissance humanism within Swedish literature; however, an earlier example of similar kind by another Swedish author does exist.
