= Intermunicipal Archives of Buskerud, Vestfold and Telemark =

The Intermunicipal Archives of Buskerud, Vestfold and Telemark (Norwegian: Interkommunalt arkiv for Buskerud, Vestfold og Telemark IKS), commonly abbreviated IKA Kongsberg, is an archives institution situated in Kongsberg, Norway. Organized as an intermunicipal company, the agency acts as the municipal archives for 67 municipalities in Buskerud, Telemark and Vestfold counties, as well as for Buskerud County Municipality and Telemark County Municipality.

IKA Kongsberg is located at Frogs vei 48, in a 3,600-square-meter (39,000 sq ft) complex situated next to the National Archives of Norway in Kongsberg. This allows them to share a reading room and conservation facilities. IKA Kongsberg has capacity for 33 shelf-kilometers of material.

== History ==
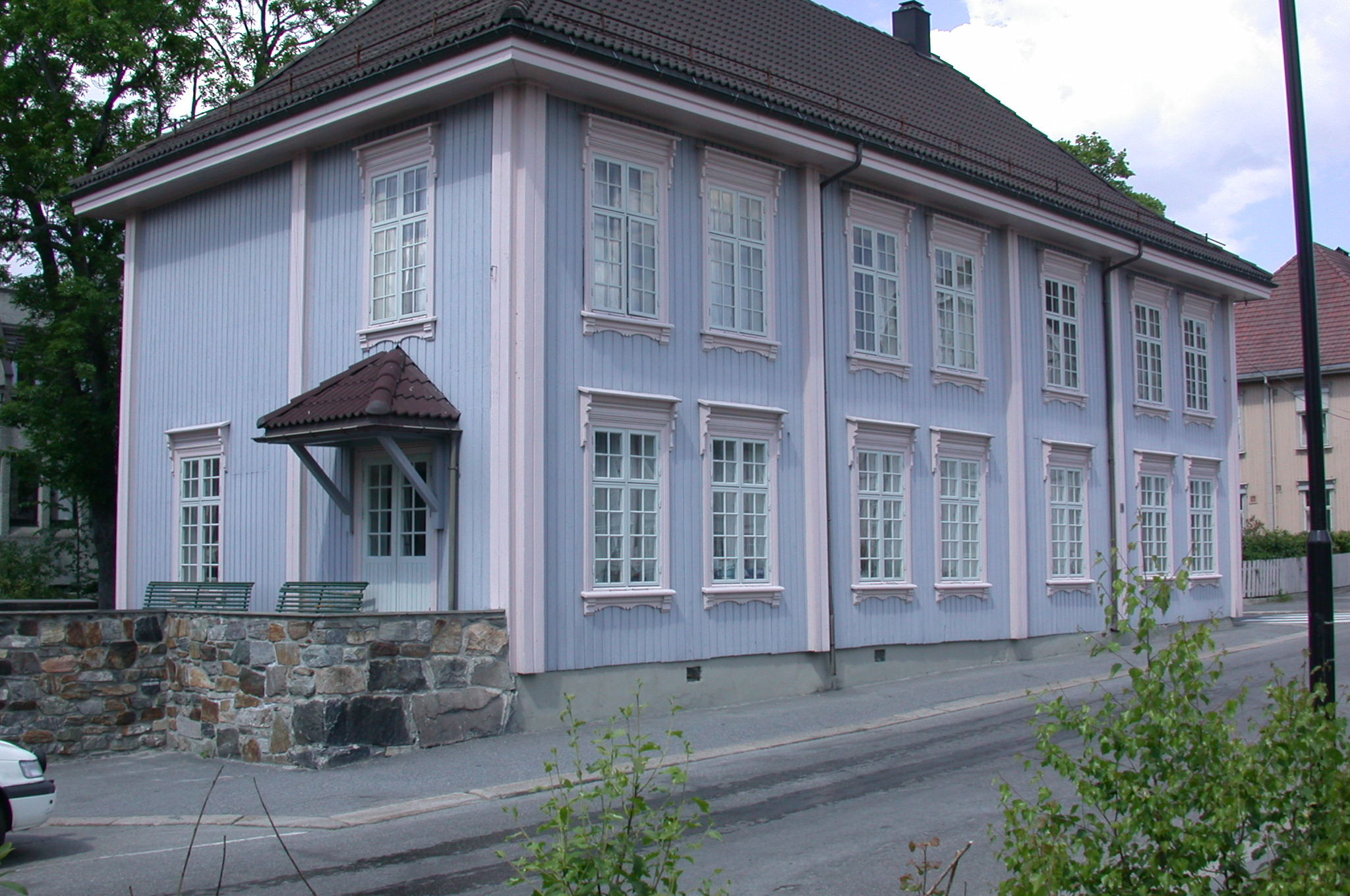
Irgensgården 2 was the site of the archives until 2014

Traditionally the three counties had their state archives stored at the National Archives of Norway in Oslo. During the 1980s it was decided that they would receive a separate institution, located in Kongsberg. This resulted in the opening of the Regional State Archives in Kongsberg, now the National Archives of Norway in Kongsberg, in 1994. In the wake of this establishment, IKA Kongsberg was established in 1992 to serve an initial 14 municipalities. The catchment area grew gradually, with an average two municipalities a year joining.

A new archives act was passed in 1999, which set new and significantly more stringent demands on the long-term municipal archival facilities. This included demands both for conservation, facilities, training, digitization and availability to the public. Traditionally most municipalities in Norway had kept their depot archives locally, often using non-professional staff to maintain the collections. The National Archival Services of Norway, now the National Archives of Norway, who were given the task of monitoring the process, with a deadline for implementation set to 2012. Only the largest cities were deemed able to create their own archival institutions and the period saw an increase in the establishment of inter-municipal archival institutions. The new demands would give all municipalities a hike in their archival costs.

IKA Kongsberg proposed the construction of a joint archives facility next to the National Archives of Norway in Kongsberg, a project known as Arkivsenter Østafjells. This facility would meet all the legal requirements. The joint location would allow the two archives to share conservation facilities and have a common reading room, allowing visitors to access municipal and state archives simultaneously. IKA Kongsberg argued that by locating both sites in Kongsberg, a larger and better archival professional environment could be established. Several municipalities came with counterproposals. Alternatives included locating the facility in Notodden Municipality, Porsgrunn Municipality and Tokke Municipality. A major cause of this debate was the price hike the new requirements would incur. The new facility opened on 24 March 2014.
