= National archivist of Norway =

Government role in Norway

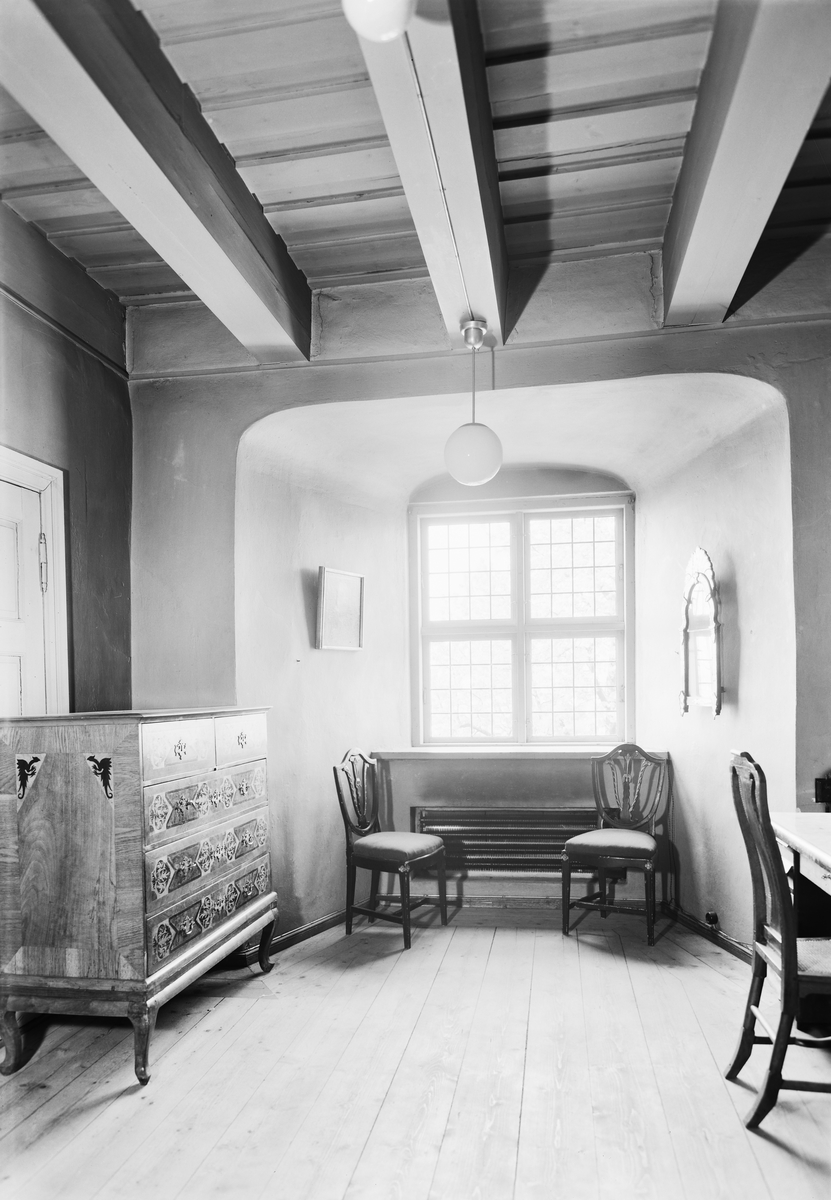
Henrik Wergeland's office at the archives in Akershus.

The national archivist (Norwegian: nasjonalarkivar) of Norway is the professional and administrative manager of the National Archives of Norway in Oslo and the National Archives of Norway. In addition, the national archivist bears direct responsibility with regard to legislation and regulations.

The position was created in 1839. Henrik Wergeland was appointed the first national archivist in 1840 and entered office in 1841. At that time, the position was limited to serving as head of the National Archives. In 1904 the position was expanded to also encompass the head of the regional state archives.

Inga Bolstad was appointed national archivist in 2014.

== List of national archivists ==
- 1840–1845 Henrik Wergeland
- 1845–1861 Christian C. A. Lange
- 1861–1863 Peter Andreas Munch
- 1863–1896 Michael Birkeland
- 1896–1905 Henrik Jørgen Huitfeldt-Kaas
- 1905–1912 Ebbe Hertzberg
- 1912–1933 Kristian Brinch Koren
- 1933–1960 Asgaut Steinnes
- 1961–1964 Reidar Omang (Hallvard Trætteberg as acting national archivist, 1963–64)
- 1965–1982 Dagfinn Mannsåker
- 1983–2006 John Herstad
- 2006–2014 Ivar Fonnes
- 2014– Inga Bolstad
