= Gyrd =

- Gender: Male

Origin
- Meaning: "God" and "peace"

Other names
- Variant form: Gyrðir

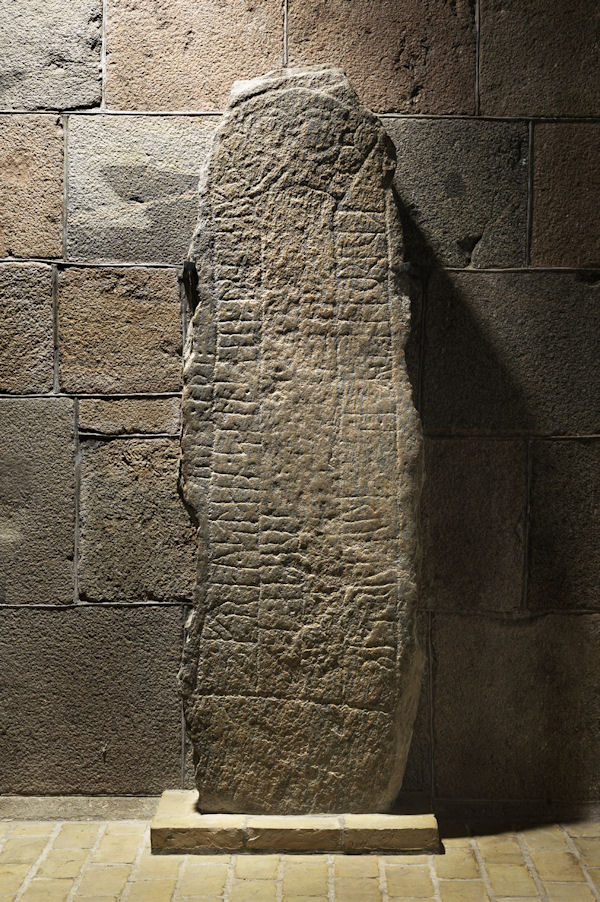
The Sjelle Runic Stone (DR 62) in Denmark commemorates a man named Gyrð.

Gyrd is an uncommon Scandinavian men's name with Norse and Old High German roots. It is also used as a women's name, but even less frequently.

== Etymology ==
The men's name Gyrd has roots in the Norse Gyrðr, which is a short form of Guðrøðr. The name came from Guðfrøðr and Guðifriðr, and ultimately from the Old High German name Godafrid, from got, "God", and fridu, "peace". The name Gyrðr has also been associated with gyrða, "farm".

== Popularity ==
Guthfrith was a common name in England in the 600s. It was in use until the 1000s, but less frequently.

Gyrðr is known to have been used in two rune inscriptions from Viking times, so the name was used, but was not common in Scandinavia at this time. Gyrd was a common name in Norway in the Middle Ages. Over 30 different people with the name are mentioned in Regesta Norvegica. In modern times, the name has been used since around 1920.

The name is now most used in Iceland, in the form Gyrðir, but this still not a common name.

The women's name Gyrd is today used very rarely.

== People with the name ==
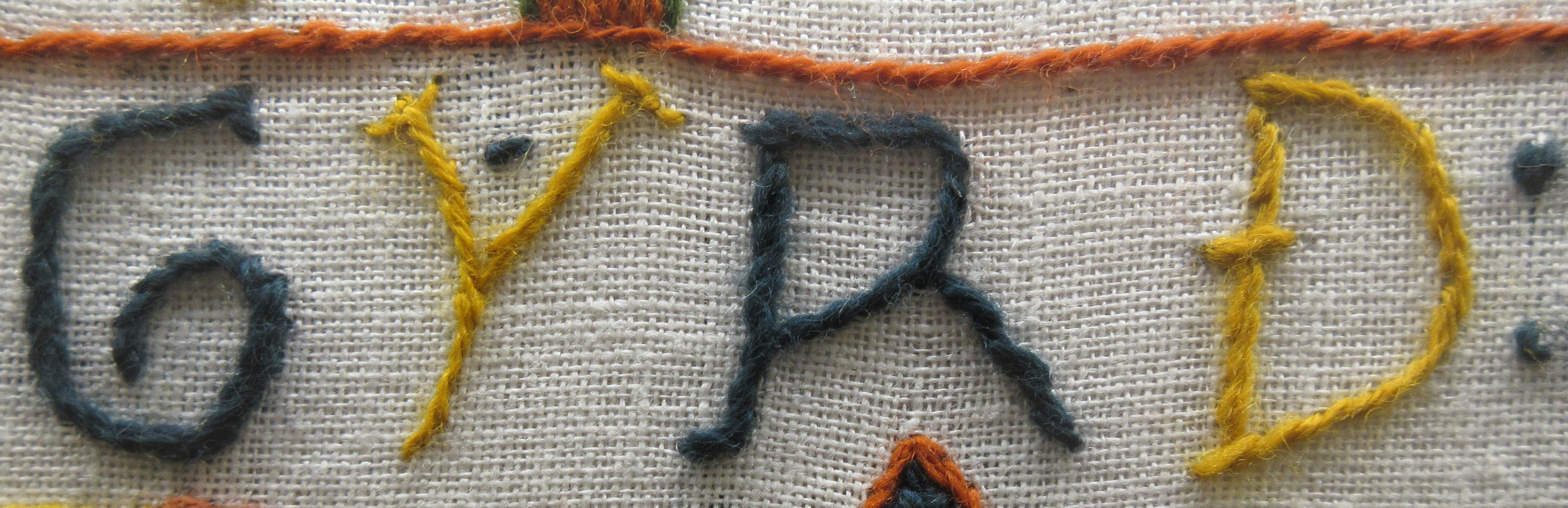
The name Gyrð as seen on the Bayeux Tapestry referring to Gyrth Godwinson.

People are listed chronologically by birth.

- Gyrd (fl. 900s), Danish king
- Gyrth Godwinson (c. 1032–1066), English nobleman
- Gyrd Løfquist (1921–2012), Danish author
- Gyrðir Elíasson (born 1961), Icelandic actor
