= Christian Lange =

Christian Lange may refer to:

- Christian Lous Lange (1869–1938), Norwegian historian, teacher, and political scientist
- Christian C. A. Lange (1810–1861), Norwegian historian and archivist
- Christian Lange (politician) (born 1967), German politician
