= Bälinge, Uppsala Municipality =

Bälinge
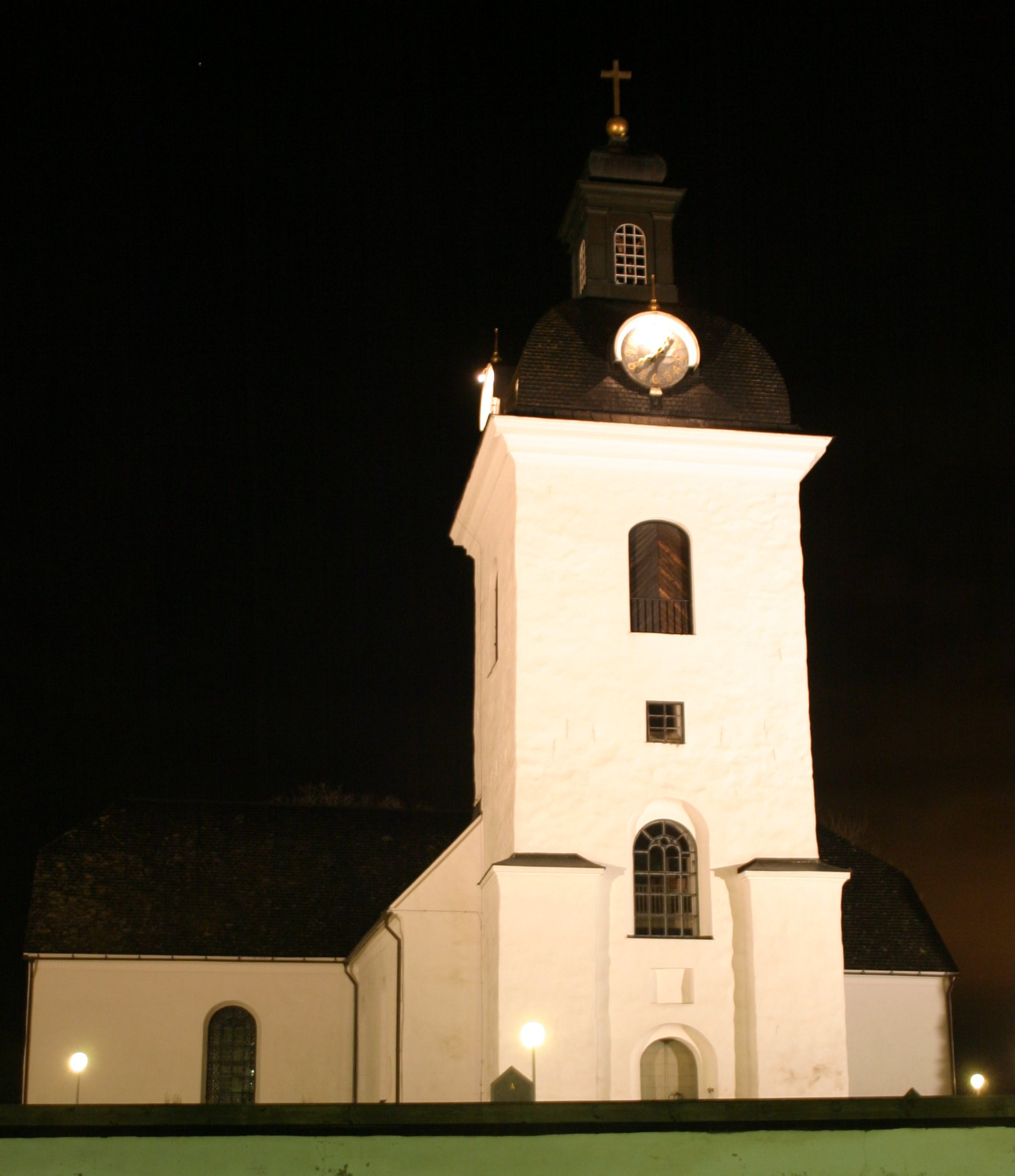
- Bälinge Church

- Location within Uppsala Location within Sweden
- Coordinates: 59°56′N 17°32′E
- Country: Sweden
- Province: Uppland
- County: Uppsala County
- Municipality: Uppsala Municipality

Area
  - Total: 1.40 km^{2} (0.54 sq mi)

Population (31 December 2010)
  - Total: 2,437
  - Density: 1,740/km^{2} (4,500/sq mi)
- Time zone: UTC+1 (CET)
  - Summer (DST): UTC+2 (CEST)

Bälinge is a locality situated in Uppsala Municipality, Uppsala County, Sweden with 2,437 inhabitants in 2010. The village was built around Bälinge Church, which was originally erected in the 13th century and is decorated with paintings made by Albertus Pictor. It was rebuilt between 1784 and 1788, and only parts of the outer walls remain from the original church. Bälinge parish is part of Bälinge Hundred, which was mentioned in 1188, 1281 and 1316 in Svenskt Diplomatarium.
