= National Archives of Norway in Tromsø =

- Nasjonalarkivet i Tromsø
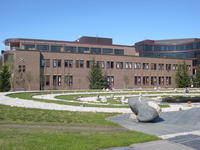
- The National Archives building in Tromsø

Division overview
- Formed: 1952
- Preceding Division: Regional State Archives in Trondheim
- Jurisdiction: Troms, Finnmark and Svalbard
- Headquarters: Breivika, Tromsø, Norway; 69.6808°N 18.9718°E
- Parent Division: National Archives of Norway
- Website: Official website

The National Archives of Norway in Tromsø (Norwegian: Nasjonalarkivet i Tromsø) is a regional state archives situated at Breivika in Tromsø, Norway. Part of the National Archives of Norway, it is responsible for archiving documents from state institutions in the counties of Troms and Finnmark, as well as Svalbard. The facility is located at the campus of the University of Tromsø. The collection includes 9.5 shelf-kilometers of material, with magazine capacity for 20.

The agency was at first an office established in 1952, subordinate the Regional State Archives in Trondheim. It became an independent office from 1987 and was renamed the Regional State Archives in Tromsø. The facility opened the following year. The name was changed to the National Archives of Norway in Tromsø January 1 2026.
