= Bernt Moe =

Norwegian encyclopedist

Bernt Moe (1 June 1814 – 5 June 1850) was a Norwegian historian, editor and encyclopedist.

Moe was born in Oslo, Norway. He was employed as an assistant in the National Archives of Norway (Riksarkivet). He was the editor of the two encyclopedias Tidsskrift for den norske personalhistorie and Biographiske Efterretninger om Eidsvolds-Repræsentanter og Storthingsmænd i Tidsrummet 1814—1845.
