= John Herstad =

Norwegian historian (born 1936)

- Born: 10 July 1936 (age 88); Bergen, Norway
- Occupation(s): Historian; Director general of the National Archives of Norway
- Awards: Order of St. Olav

John Herstad (born 10 July 1936) is a Norwegian historian.

He was born in Bergen. Herstad was appointed professor at the University of Bergen from 1980. He served the head of the National Archives of Norway from 1982 to 2006. He was decorated Commander of the Order of St. Olav in 2005.
