= Johannes Stenrat =

German painter

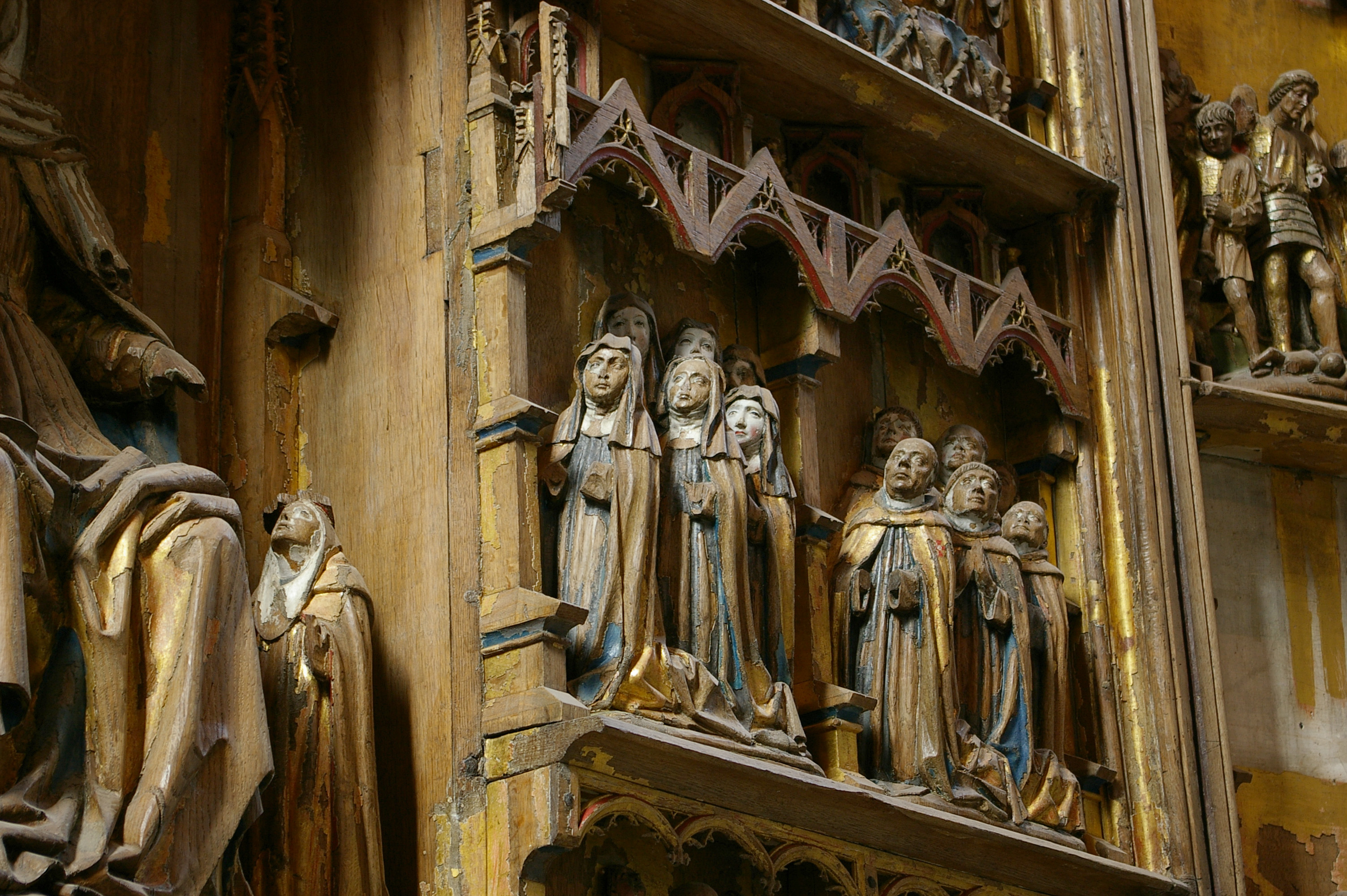
Detail view of the altarpiece in Vadstena Abbey created by Johannes Stenrat and Hans Hesse

Johannes Stenrat (sometimes Hans Stenrat, Stenradh, Stenrat of Lübeck, Stenrode, Steynrot) c. 1410–1484) was a German Northern Renaissance wood carver and painter, active in Lübeck.

== Life and works ==
Johannes Stenrat was born and seems to have lived most of his life in Lübeck; his name appears frequently in the city archives between 1455 and 1484. In records from the time he is always described with the low German word meler, literally meaning painter, but in the Baltic Sea area at the time signifying an artist who is working both as a wood carver and a painter.

In 1458 he received a commission to finish an altarpiece for Vadstena Abbey in Sweden. Work on the altarpiece had begun two years before by Hans Hesse, but apparently Hesse never finished his work. It is not entirely clear what parts of the altarpiece was made by which artist. Johannes Stenrat's signature (now erased) was also placed on an altarpiece in Bälinge Church outside Uppsala (also in Sweden). An altarpiece in St. Anne's Museum, Lübeck has also been securely attributed to Stenrat, and a painting in St. Nicholas' Church, Rostock displays many similarities with the Vadstena altarpiece. In addition, several altarpieces in Swedish churches (e.g. Kråksmåla, Rumskulla, Torsås, Salem, Sorunda, Bälinge and Högsrum) have been attributed to Johannes Stenrat, but these attributions remain more or less uncertain.
