= Digital Archives =

Norwegian digital archive

Digital Archives (Norwegian: Digitalarkivet) is a website of the National Archives of Norway for publishing digitized archival material. The website contains sources that are both and transcribed (searchable) and scanned. The most important searchable sources are the nationwide censuses of 1801, 1865, 1900, and 1910. In addition, it contains many transcribed parish registers and emigration records. The website is available in both Norwegian and English.

Most of the scanned sources apply to all of Norway. These include parish registers up to about 1930, real estate registers up to 1950, probate documents up to about 1850, court journal transcriptions up to about 1800, feudal account books and county account records to about 1700, old censuses for 1664–1666 and 1701, the landed property tax initiative of 1723, and the landed property tax list of 1838. Some of the sources cover only parts of Norway, such as the address books for Kristiania/Oslo and Aker and certain genealogical collections.

As of June 2013, the Digital Archives website offered access to 12,967 photographed parish registers (2.5 million double-sided pages) and 15,473 mortgage registers (7.6 million pages). In 2011, 225.8 million pages were downloaded from the website.

The Digital Archives website was created in 1998 by staff at the National Archives of Norway in Bergen for transcribed sources. Since 2005 it has also included scanned sources.
