= Diehtosiida =

Campus and academic facility in Kautokeino, Norway

Coordinates: 69.0144°N 23.0372°E

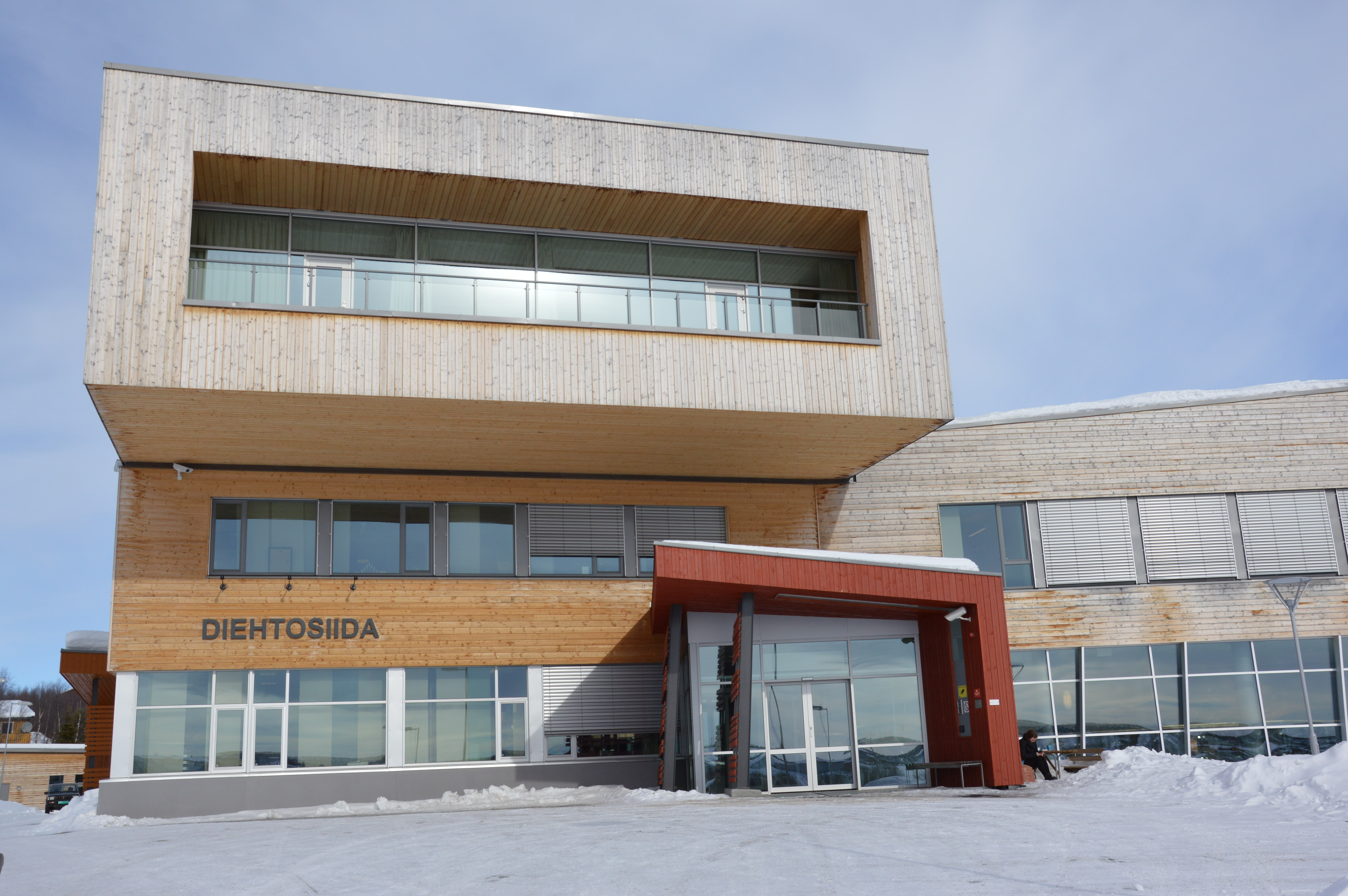
Exterior

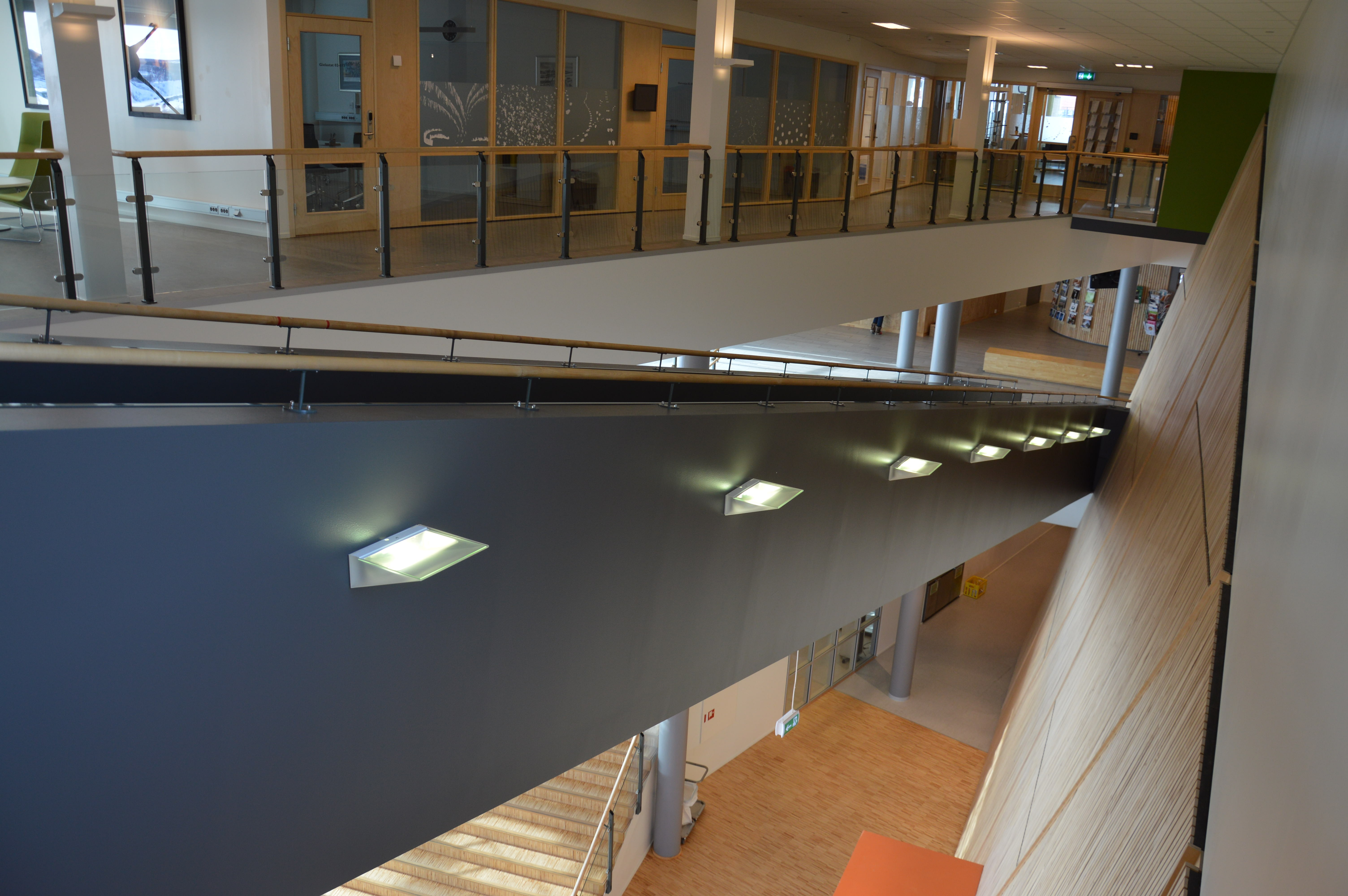
Interior

The Diehtosiida (lit. 'knowledge-place') is a campus and academic facility situated in Kautokeino, Norway. It houses several Sámi academic institutions – the Sámi University College, The Sámi Archives, Inner Finnmark Student Welfare Organization, the language department of the Sámi Parliament of Norway, the International Centre for Reindeer Husbandry and the International Resource Centre on Indigenous Rights. The facility opened in 2009.

== See also ==
- Sajos
- Siida (museum)
