= Simen Oscar Fredrik Omang =

Norwegian botanist (1867–1953)

- Born: 23 March 1867; Hamar, Norway
- Died: 29 November 1953 (aged 86)
- Occupation: botanist
- Children: Reidar Omang

Simen Oscar Fredrik Omang (23 March 1867 – November 1953) was a Norwegian botanist and educator whose work focused on the taxonomy of the hawkweed genus Hieracium, one of the most taxonomically complex plant groups in Scandinavian flora. Over a career spanning more than five decades, Omang documented, classified, and named about 2,250 different plant taxa within this genus, establishing himself as a leading authority on Nordic hawkweeds. He combined his botanical research with a teaching career until 1927, after which he devoted himself exclusively to botanical studies until his death.

== Biography ==
Omang was born in Hamar on 23 March 1867 and completed his secondary education in Oslo in 1886. He studied at the University of Oslo, where he obtained a mathematical‑scientific teaching qualification in 1895. From 1896 to 1902, he taught at Svend Foyn's School in Oslo. He then served as an adjunct at Larvik Municipal Higher General School (1902–1911) and at Skien Public Higher General School (1911–1919), also managing Skien Technical Evening School from 1914 to 1919. His final teaching position was as a lecturer at Frogner Higher Municipal General School in Oslo (1919–1927).

After retiring from teaching in 1927, Omang concentrated on botanical research, specialising in Hieracium. His research continued until his death in November 1953. A paper on the Alpina group within Hieracium was published posthumously in 1954 in Nytt Magasin for Naturvitenskapene. Simen Omang was the father of Reidar Omang.

== Scientific contributions ==
Omang's first appearance in botanical literature was in 1892 under the guidance of Axel Blytt. He began his own work on Hieracium in 1897 and received a research grant in 1899 to study specimens in Krødsherad and Hallingdal. The results were published in 1900 as "Nogle archieracier fra Hallingdal og Krødsherad" in Nyt Magasin for Naturvidenskaberne.

His field studies included regions of Norway such as Larvik (1902–1911) and Skien–Bamble (1911–1917), as well as expeditions to East Greenland and Iceland. Each study led to detailed publications in monographs or journal articles. In total, he authored 31 monographs on Hieracium and contributed to five flora volumes, including Carl Hansen Ostenfeld and Johannes Grøntvedt's The Flora of Iceland and the Færoes (1934). He proposed classifications for groups such as Oreadea (1908), Pilosella (1936) and Alpina (1954).

By the mid‑1920s, Omang had described roughly 2,250 taxa within Hieracium. In 1926, he donated around 20,000 herbarium sheets to the Botanical Museum in Oslo, with further collections donated later.

Omang distributed an exsiccata-like series of specimens named by him Specimina selecta Hieraciorum Norvegiae ('Selected specimens of Norwegian hawkweeds').

== Legacy ==
In 1951, Omang was awarded the Royal Norwegian Order of Merit in gold. His herbarium collections and publications remain available at the Botanical Museum in Oslo. In a memorial in Blyttia (vol. 12), Per Størmer noted Omang's long-term focus on the taxonomy of Hieracium. Omang's work on Hieracium continues to be cited in taxonomic studies of the genus, and his collections serve as reference material for subsequent research.
