= National Archives of Norway in Stavanger =

- Nasjonalarkivet i Stavanger

Division overview
- Formed: 1914
- Preceding Division: Regional State Archives in Bergen
- Jurisdiction: Rogaland
- Headquarters: Bergelandsgt. 30; Stavanger, Norway; 58.9682°N 5.7366°E
- Parent Division: National Archives of Norway
- Website: Official website

The National Archives of Norway in Stavanger (Norwegian: Nasjonalarkivet i Stavanger) is a regional state archives situated in Stavanger, Norway. Part of the National Archives of Norway, it is responsible for archiving documents from state institutions in the county of Rogaland—the only regional state archive to cover only a single county. On January 1 2026, the name was changed from the Regional State Archives in Stavanger to the National Archives of Norway in Stavanger. The facility is jointly located with the Intermunicipal Archives of Rogaland. The collection includes 15 shelf-kilometers of material.

State archive documents from Rogaland were originally stored at the Regional State Archives in Bergen. A branch of this opened at Stavanger Hospital in 1949, after which most of the material was moved. It moved from a basement office at the hospital to the new Norges Bank building in Stavanger in 1964. The division was made an independent regional state archive in 1970. The 700 shelf-meters was soon insufficient and the archives had to rent capacity at various locations throughout town. It moved to the current site at IMI-gården in 1987, where it received a capacity for 7,000 shelf-meters. This was increased to 12,000 in 2002 and 15,500 in 2008. IKA Rogaland has been co-located since 2002.
