= National Archives of Norway in Bergen =

Norwegian state archive

- Nasjonalarkivet i Bergen

Division overview
- Formed: 1885
- Preceding Division: National Archives of Norway in Oslo
- Jurisdiction: Hordaland and Sogn og Fjordane
- Headquarters: Årstadveien 22 Oslo, Norway; 60°22′51″N 5°21′35″E
- Employees: 22
- Parent Division: National Archives of Norway
- Website: Official website

The National Archives of Norway in Bergen (Norwegian: Nasjonalarkivet i Bergen) is a state archive situated at Årstad in Bergen, Norway. Part of the National Archives of Norway, it is responsible for archiving documents from state institutions in the counties of Hordaland and Sogn og Fjordane. The collection includes 15 shelf-kilometers of material.

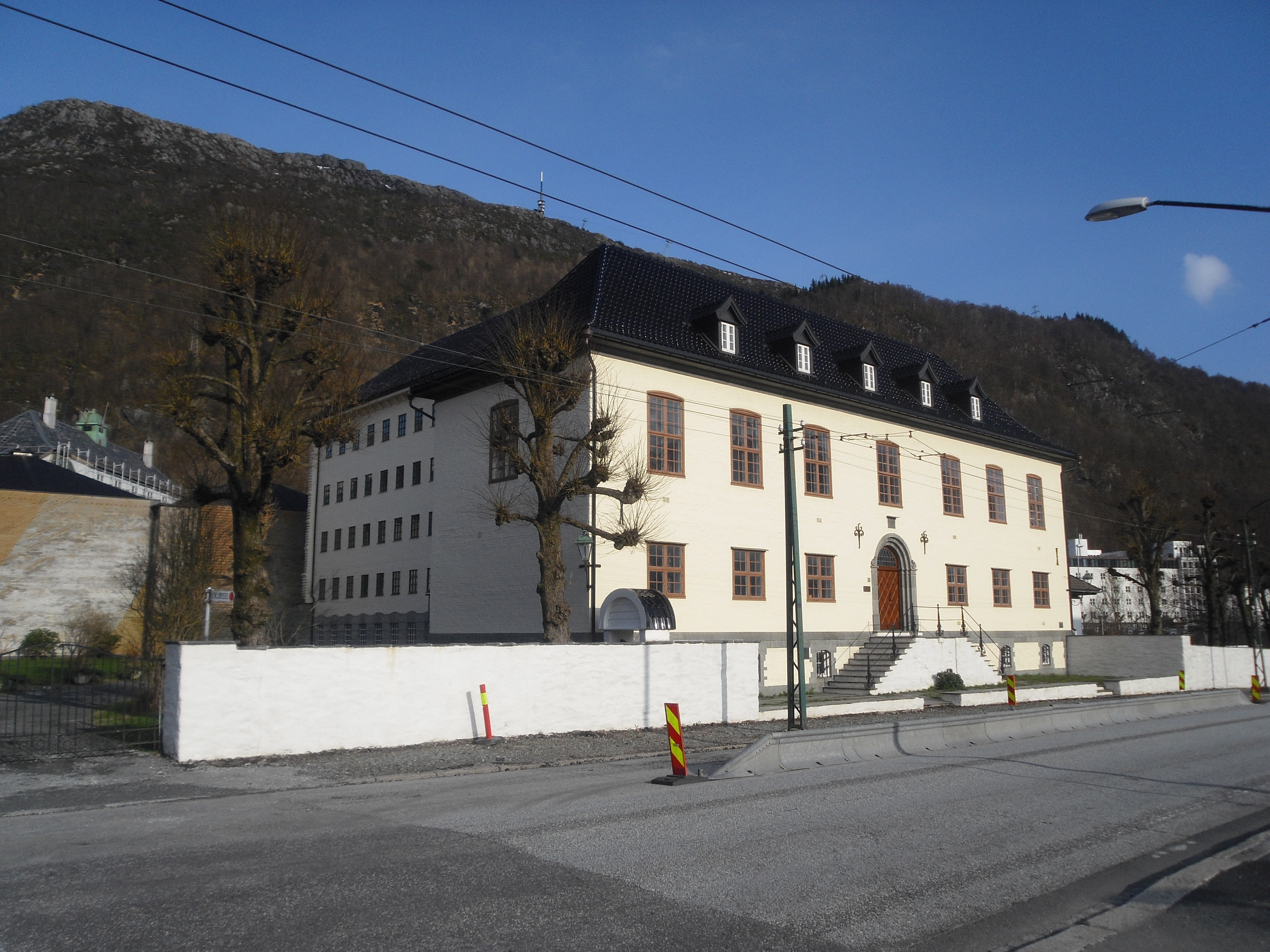
The archives are located at Årstad

The office was established in 1885, as the second regional state archive in Norway. Originally situated at Klosteret 17, the archives moved to their current location in 1921. Documents from Sunnmøre were stored in Bergen until about 1930, after which they were moved to the Regional State Archives in Trondheim. Until the 1949 establishment of the Regional State Archives in Stavanger, the Bergen division was also responsible for documents from Rogaland. The Rogaland office remained administratively subordinate to Bergen until 1970. Expansions to the building were built in 1975 and 1992. On January 1 2026, the name was changed to the National Archives of Norway in Bergen.
