= Reidar Omang =

Norwegian historian, librarian and archivist

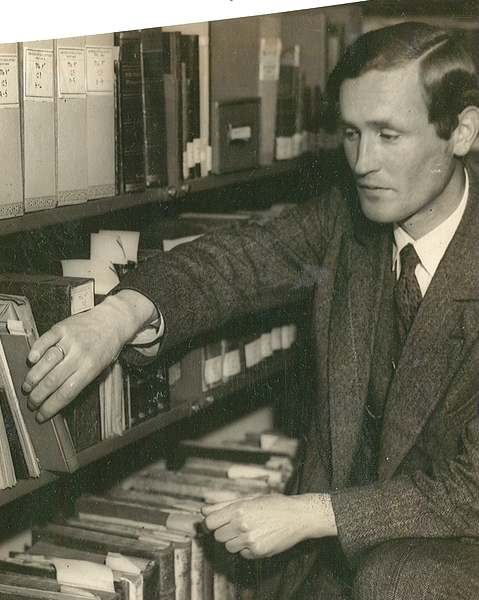
Reidar Omang, c. 1940.

Reidar Omang (26 November 1897 – 15 October 1964) was a Norwegian historian, librarian and archivist.

== Early life and education ==
Reidar Omang was born in Kristiania (now Oslo), Norway. His father, Simen Oscar Fredrik Omang (1867-1953), was a noted botanist. Omang took matriculation from the Skien public school in 1916. He took his Cand.mag. degree at the University of Oslo in 1924 and Cand. philol. in 1930.

== Career ==
=== Teaching career ===
He was a teacher in Kviteseid Municipality in Telemark county from 1918 to 1919 and at Skien from 1919 to 1920. From 1923 to 1935 he was employed at the University of Oslo Library. During 1928–1935, he was also chief of the Manuscript Collection. From 1928 to 1945, he was librarian at the Norwegian Royal Palace. In 1935, he was appointed chief of the Foreign Ministry archives. a position he had until 1960.

=== World War II ===
During the Nazi occupation of Norway, he led the evacuation of documents from the Foreign Ministry archives to Sweden. In 1941 he went to London and worked in the Norwegian Ministry of Foreign Affairs until liberation. He also edited several governmental documents on Norway, including treatises on Norway's relation to Sweden, on the Altmark Incident, and on the relation between the government-in-exile and the resistance movement. After the war, Reidar Omang published the two volume series Norsk utenrikstjeneste from 1955 to 1959. From 1961 he served as national archivist, a position he held until his death in 1964. Reidar Omang was a member of the Norwegian Academy of Science and Letters from 1957. He was also knighted by first class of the Royal Order of St. Olav.

== Selected works ==
- Regjeringen og hjemmefronten under krigen (1948)
- Norges forhold til Sverige under krigen 1940–45 (3 bd., 1947–50)
- Altmarksaken 1940 (1953)
- Norge og stormaktene 1906–14 (1957)
