= National Archives of Norway in Kongsberg =

- Nasjonalarkivet i Kongsberg

Division overview
- Formed: 1994
- Preceding Division: National Archives of Norway in Oslo
- Jurisdiction: Buskerud, Telemark and Vestfold
- Headquarters: Kongsberg, Norway; 59.6840°N 9.6518°E
- Parent Division: National Archives of Norway
- Website: Official website

National Archives of Norway in Kongsberg (Norwegian: Statsarkivet i Kongsberg) is a regional state archive situated in Kongsberg, Norway. Part of the National Archives of Norway, it is responsible for archiving documents from state institutions in the counties of Buskerud, Telemark and Vestfold. The agency is the youngest regional state archive, opening in 1994. Prior to this, documents from the three counties were stored at the Regional State Archives in Oslo. The archive has about 14 shelf-kilometers of material. Intermunicipal Archives of Buskerud, Vestfold and Telemark moved to an adjoining building in 2014, allowing the two to share a common reading room and conservation facilities. On January 1 2026, the name was changed from the Regional State Archives in Kongsberg to the National Archives of Norway in Kongsberg.
