= Regesta Norvegica =

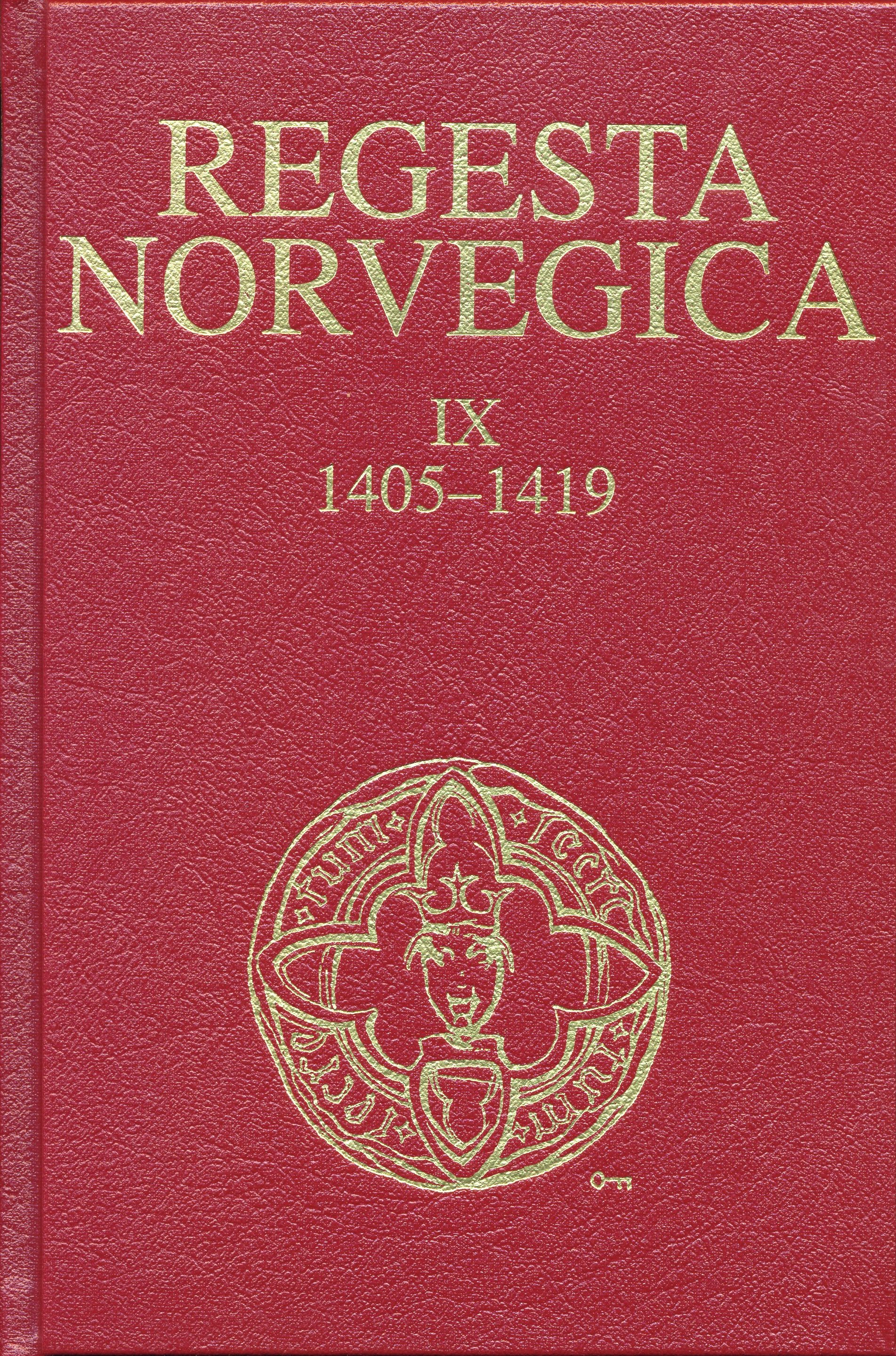
Cover of Regesta Norvegica, volume IX

Regesta Norvegica is a chronological inventory of all known documents relating to the history of Norway during the Middle Ages. The series contains summaries in modern Norwegian of medieval documents concerning Norway and Norwegian affairs.

== History ==
Gustav Storm (1845 – 1903) first published Regesta Norvegica in 1898. It contained 630 texts, and covered the years 991–1263. [Gustav Storm was at that time a professor of history at the Royal Frederick University in Christiania. His area of focus was the research of Scandinavian history and literature of the Middle Ages.

In 1966, work began on a new edition. A committee was established and responsibility for the first volumes was given to the Norwegian universities. Later, for volumes VI and onwards, the responsibility was transferred to Norsk Historisk Kjeldeskriftinstitutt. In 1991 this institute was integrated as a separate department of the National Archives of Norway (Riksarkivet).

So far nine volumes are published, covering the years 822–1419. Two further volumes are in progress: Part X (1420–1430) and XI (1431–1440). When completed the series is expected to cover the whole medieval period of Norwegian history.

- Part I, 1989.
- Part II, 1978.
- Part III, 1983
- Part IV, 1979
- Part V, 1979.
- Part VI, 1993
- Part VII, 1998
- Part VIII, 2006
- Part IX, 2010
- Part X, 2015

== Dokumentasjonsprosjektet ==
Volumes I–X of Regesta Norvegica are digitized and freely accessible, created in cooperation between the National Archives of Norway and Enhet for Digital Dokumentasjon (Dokumentasjonsprosjektet), University of Oslo. Dokumentasjonsprosjektet is a collaboration between the humanities at the University of Bergen, University of Oslo, University of Trondheim and University of Tromsø with the aim of using modern computer technology to provide access to collections of languages and culture in Norway. The purpose has been to make universities' collections of language and culture digitally available.

== See also ==
- Diplomatarium Norvegicum
