= The Sámi Archives =

Public archive in Norway with information on the Sami people

Coordinates: 69.0144°N 23.0372°E

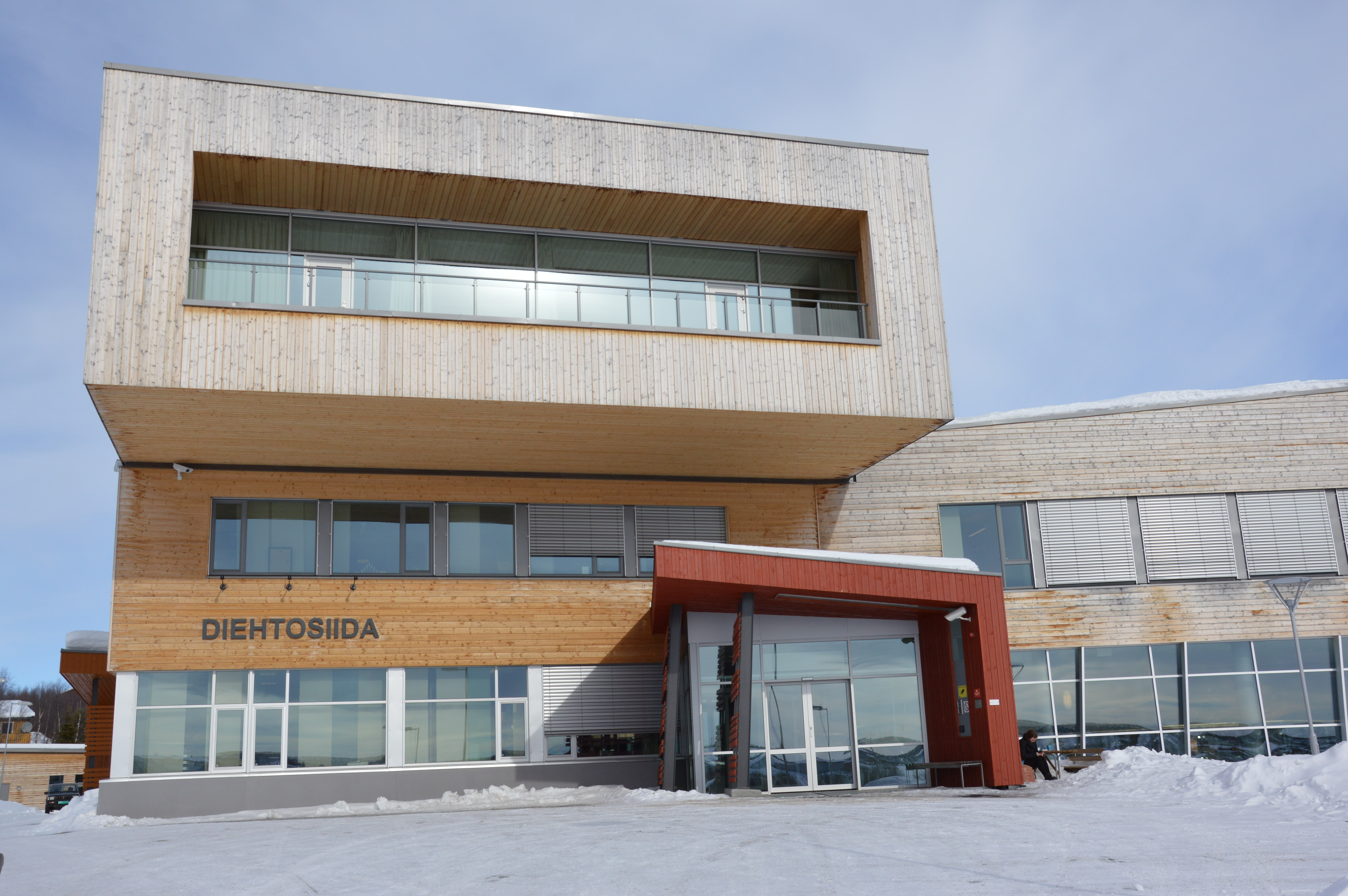
The Sámi Archives are situated in Diehtosiida

The Sámi Archives (Norwegian: Samisk arkiv; Northern Sami: Sámi Arkiiva) is a public archive storing material related to the Sámi people. It is located in the Sami academic park Diehtosiida in Kautokeino, Norway. It was established in 1988, originally as a foundation, and was from 2005 part of the National Archives of Norway.
