= Bjarne M. Robberstad =

Norwegian civil servant (1912–1977)

Bjarne Martin Robberstad (16 May 1912 – 3 January 1977) was a Norwegian civil servant.

He was born in Herdla Municipality as a son of bailiff Magnus Robberstad (1867–1954) and Lydia Friis (1873–1939). He was a brother of Henrik and Knut Robberstad. In 1941 he married dentist Anna Tveit.

He finished his secondary education in 1933 and graduated with the cand.jur. degree in 1937. He worked in Lånekassen for jordbrukere and the Ministry of Church Affairs and Education before being hired as secretary in the Ministry of Provisioning in 1939. In 1946 he went on to Provianterings- og rasjoneringsdirektoratet as director, became deputy Secretary General in the Ministry of Agriculture in 1954 and permanent Secretary General from 1959 to 1977.

From 1956 to 1960 he was a member of Oslo city council, for the Liberal Party, and a board member of Oslo Kinematografer. He was a board member of the Directorate of State Forests from 1957 to 1966 and of Nes Trælastbrug. He also chaired Det Norske Teatret from 1948 to his death in 1977, and the Association of Norwegian Theatres from 1965 to 1969. He then chaired the supervisory council of the latter.

He was decorated as a Commander of the Order of St. Olav (1969), of the Order of the Dannebrog and the Order of the White Rose of Finland, and a Grand Knight of the Order of the Falcon. He died in January 1977.

Civic offices
Preceded by	Permanent under-secretary of state in the Norwegian Ministry of Agriculture; 1959–1977	Succeeded by
Cultural offices
Preceded by Asgaut Steinnes	Chairman of Det Norske Teatret; 1948–1977	Succeeded by
