= National Archives of Norway in Hamar =

- Nasjonalarkivet i Hamar

Division overview
- Formed: 1917
- Preceding Division: National Archives of Norway in Oslo
- Jurisdiction: Oppland and Hedmark
- Headquarters: Lille Strandgt. 3 Hamar, Norway; 58°10′03″N 8°00′58″E
- Parent Division: National Archives of Norway
- Website: Official website

The National Archives of Norway in Hamar (Norwegian: Nasjonalarkivet i Hamar) is a regional state archives situated in Hamar, Norway. Part of the National Archives of Norway and is responsible for preserving records from state institutions in the former counties of Oppland and Hedmark. The collection includes approximately nine shelf-kilometers of archival material.

The agency was established on 13 July 1917, taking over archival responsibilities for the two counties from the National Archives of Norway in Oslo. It was initially located at Parkgt. 2, relocating to Strandgt. 71 in 1958. In 1991, it moved to its current premises at Lille Strandgt. 3. On January 1 2026, the name was changed from the Regional State Archives in Hamar to the National Archives of Norway in Hamar.
