= Asgaut Steinnes =

Norwegian historian (1892–1973)

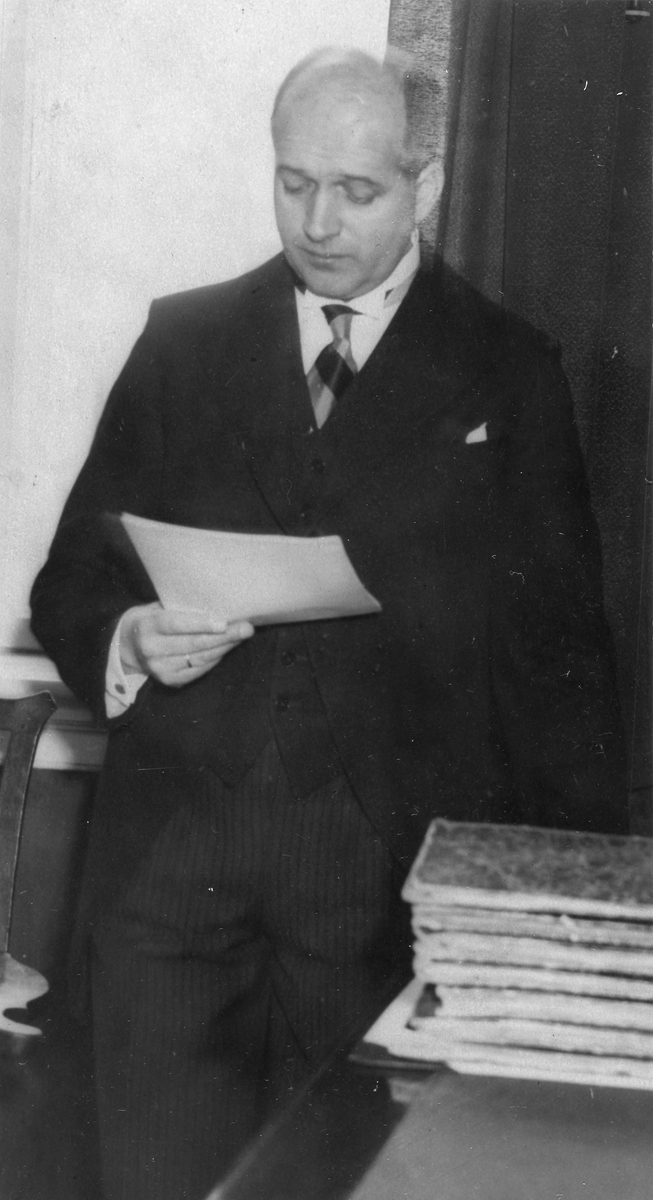
- Asgaut Steinnes (1935)
- Born: 11 October 1892; Klepp Municipality, Norway
- Died: 6 July 1973 (aged 80); Oslo
- Occupations: archivist and historian
- Awards: Order of St. Olav; Order of the Dannebrog

Asgaut Steinnes (11 October 1892 – 6 July 1973) was a Norwegian archivist and historian who specialized in the Middle Ages. He served as National archivist of Norway from 1933 to 1960.

== Career ==
Steinnes was born in Klepp Municipality in Stavanger amt (county), Norway on 11 October 1892. He was the son of a farmer, teacher and cantor. He earned his Ph.D. in 1928 with a dissertation on the tax system in the Middle Ages. From 1933 to 1960 he was the national archivist of Norway. From 1961 he was a statsstipendiat (government scholar).

Steinnes was one of the pioneers of the agrarian tradition in the research of Norwegian history research. His major contributions were primarily detailed studies of taxation, property and settlement in earlier times. Insights from them were used to shed light on major historical issues such as the reasons why Norway ceased to be an independent state in the Late Middle Ages, the impact of the Black Death and the growth of royal power. The method of Steinnes was a thorough and exact (quantitative) analysis of place names, land books, legal documents, financial statements and cadastres, etc. His systemic efforts to map the actual dimensions of units of size, weight and money in the Middle Ages became the model for all the subsequent analyses of the economic history of the ancient times.

For his work, Steinnes was made the Commander of the Order of the Dannebrog in Denmark in 1948 and the Knight of the Order of St. Olav in 1961 in Norway.

Steinnes died in Oslo, Norway, on 6 July 1973.

== Bibliography ==
- (no) 1927 Leidang og landskyld [Levies and Land Rents], doctoral dissertation
- (no) 1928-1933 Gamal skatteskipnad i Noreg [Old Tax Systems in Norway] (2 volumes). One of the first works to apply the retrospective method.
- (no) 1936 Mål, vekt og verderekning i Noreg i millomalderen og ei tid etter [Size, Weight and Value Calculations in the Middle Ages and Thereafter], still the most thorough and comprehensive work on the units of weights and money in the Middle Ages.
- (no, la) 1958 Latinsk ordbok [Latin Dictionary], along with Elrik Vandvik. New edition in 1989

== Literature ==
- Salvesen, Helge (1982). "The Strength of Tradition. A Historiographical Analysis of Research into Norwegian Agrarian History during the Later Middle Ages and the Early Modern Period". Scandinavian Journal of History. 7: 75–133.

Cultural offices
Preceded by Vigleik Trygve Sundt	Chairman of Det Norske Teatret; 1947–1948	Succeeded by Bjarne M. Robberstad
