= Inga Bolstad =

Norwegian archivist

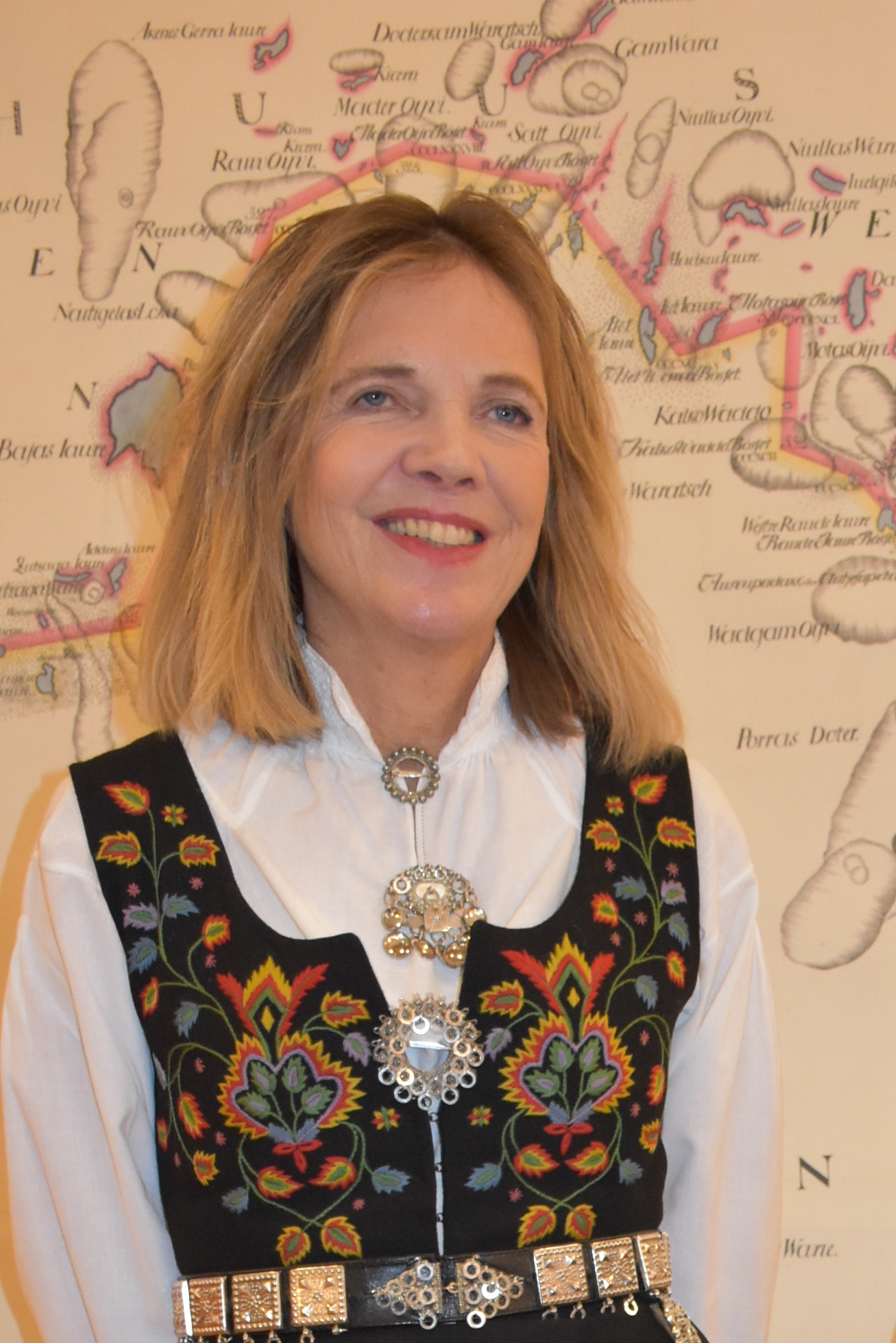

Inga Bolstad (born May 17, 1966) is a Norwegian archivist.

Bolstad was appointed the national archivist of Norway in June 2014. She previously worked at the Norwegian Tax Administration, where she held management positions for the previous 16 years. She was initially a department head at the Norwegian Tax Administration, and then in 2007 she became the head of the administration's IT and service partner, SITS. During her career there, she was among the administration's senior managers and was responsible for organizational services and a major reorganization at the agency.
