= The National Documentation Project of Norway =

Coordinates: 59°56′23″N 10°43′10″E

The National Documentation Project of Norway (DokumentasjonsProsjekte ) was an effort to digitize information contained within the museums of Norwegian universities. Museums formed the nucleus for the founding of the traditional Norwegian university system. Norwegian university museums house collections containing information covering a wide range of Norwegian society. The purpose of the Documentation Project was to convert information from paper based archives to electronically readable media in order to make the archives more accessible. The project was started at the University of Oslo in 1991. The project was a national collaborative project centering on materials contained within the four traditional Norwegian Universities: University of Bergen, University of Oslo, University of Tromsø and the Norwegian University of Science and Technology (Trondheim).
