= Christian C. A. Lange =

Norwegian historian and archivist

Christian Christoph Andreas Lange
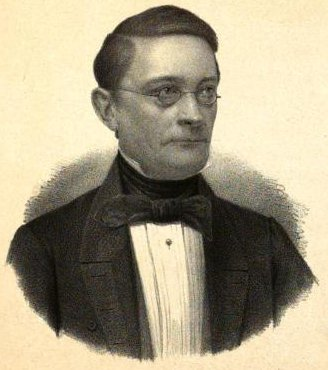
- Born: 13 August 1810; Bærum, Norway
- Died: 10 May 1861 (aged 50); Christiania, Norway
- Resting place: Old Aker Cemetery
- Occupations: Historian, archivist

Christian Christoph Andreas Lange (13 August 1810 – 10 May 1861) was a Norwegian historian and archivist.

Lange was born in Bærum. After his examen artium he started studying theology and took his comprehensive exam in theology in 1833. However, during his studies, he had a strong interest in language and history. In 1834, he was employed as a teacher of religion, Norwegian, geography, and history at the Naval Cadets' School in Stavern. His strong interest in historical sources led him to Copenhagen to study the Arnamagnæan Manuscript Collection, and he published several minor works in his Samlinger til Det Norske Folks Sprog og Historie (Collections of Norwegian Popular Language and History; 1834–1837). Lange published Hannibal Sehested's letter book from 1645. He called for improvements in the book trade and set up a bookshop himself in Fredriksvern. In the late 1830s, he made research trips around Norway, and to Denmark and Germany, and participated in gathering material about Norway's monasteries. He received a stipend to carry out this work in 1843.

Lange was named national archivist in 1845. He published his extensive work on Norwegian monasteries from 1845 to 1847. Lange belonged to the circle known as the "Norwegian historical school" that formed around Rudolf Keyser, Carl Richard Unger, and P. A. Munch, and he saw collecting and publishing historical source texts as his mission. Lange provided the initiative to start publishing the series Diplomatarium Norvegicum, of which he edited the first five volumes. Lange was also the force behind the series Norske rigs-registranter (Norwegian National Registers), a collection of legislation and decisions made by the Danish-Norwegian kings from 1523 to 1660, but he died shortly before the first volume was published. As the national archivist, Lange strove to organize and structure the archives. He also established the Norsk Forfatter-Lexikon 1814–1856 (Encyclopedia of Norwegian Authors, 1814–1856) together with Jens Edvard Kraft, published in 1863.

A street in Oslo, Langes gate, is named after Lange. Lange had nine children and many further descendants. Among his descendants are his grandson Christian Lous Lange (1869–1938), a 1921 recipient of the Nobel Peace Prize, and his great-grandsons Halvard Lange (1902–1970), a politician and diplomat, and August Lange (1907–1970), an educator and cultural attaché. Lange's granddaughter, Ellen Lous Lange, was married to the writer Johan Bojer (1872–1959), and they were the great-grandparents of the folk singer and actor Odd Nordstoga (born 1972), according to the documentary and genealogy series Hvem tror du at du er?

== Works ==
- De norske Klostres Historie i Middelalderen (The History of the Norwegian Monasteries in the Middle Ages; 1845–1847, second revised edition 1856)
