= National Archives of Norway in Kristiansand =

- Nasjonalarkivet i Kristiansand
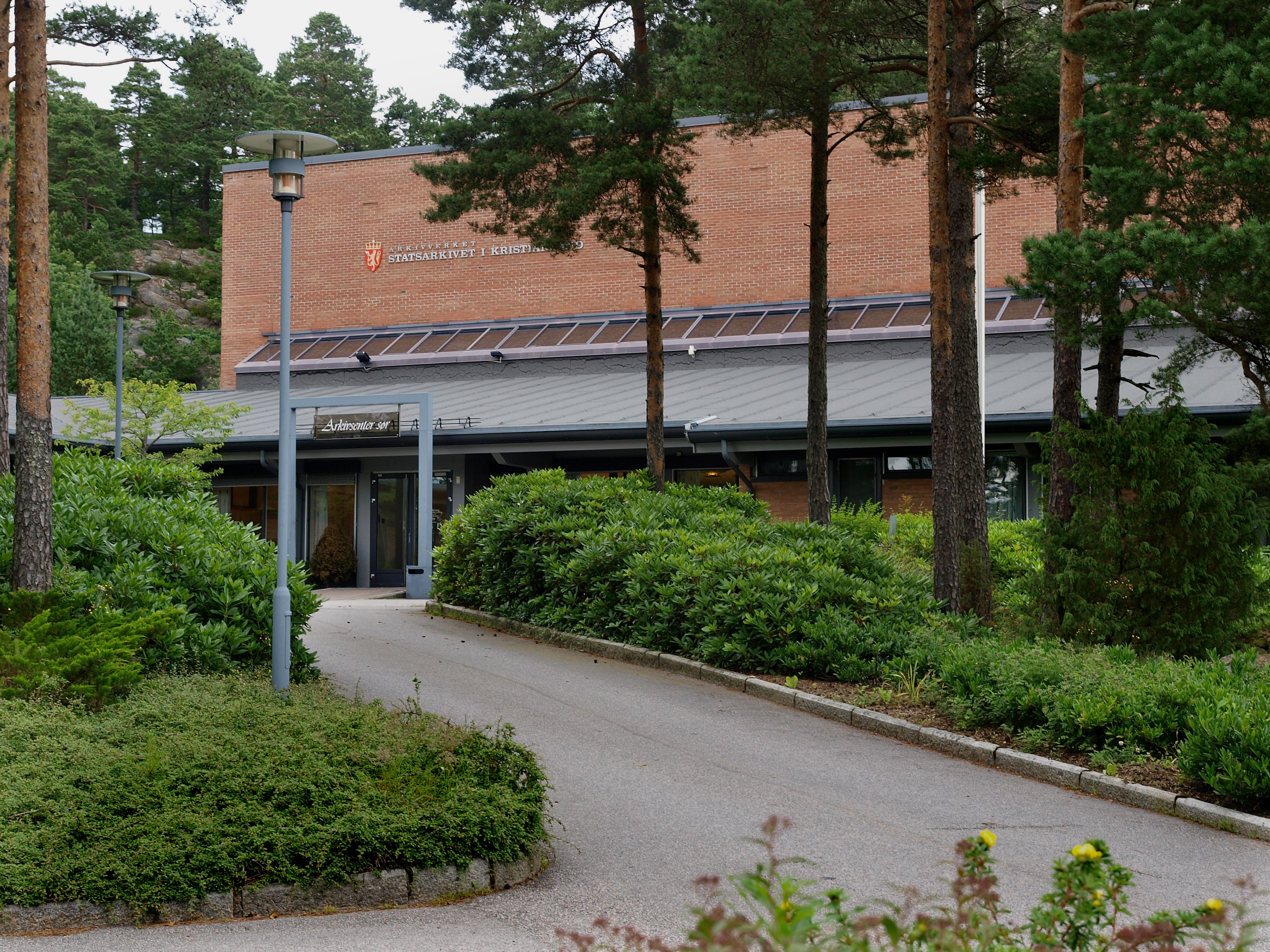
- Arkivsenter sør

Division overview
- Formed: 1934
- Preceding Division: National Archives of Norway in Oslo
- Jurisdiction: Agder
- Headquarters: Märthas vei 1 Kristiansand, Norway; 58°10′03″N 8°00′58″E
- Parent Division: National Archives of Norway
- Website: Official website

The National Archives of Norway in Kristiansand (Norwegian: Nasjonalarkivet i Kristiansand) is a regional state archive situated in Kristiansand, Norway. Part of the National Archives of Norway, it is responsible for archiving documents from state institutions in the counties of Aust-Agder and Vest-Agder. The collection includes ten shelf-kilometers of material from the 16th century to the 1990s. The archives have been at their current site since 1997, premises which are shared with the Intermunicipal Archives of Vest-Agder. The archives were established in 1934, taking over documents covering Agder from the Regional State Archives in Oslo. On January 1 2026, the name was changed from the Regional State Archives in Kristiansand to the National Archives of Norway in Kristiansand.

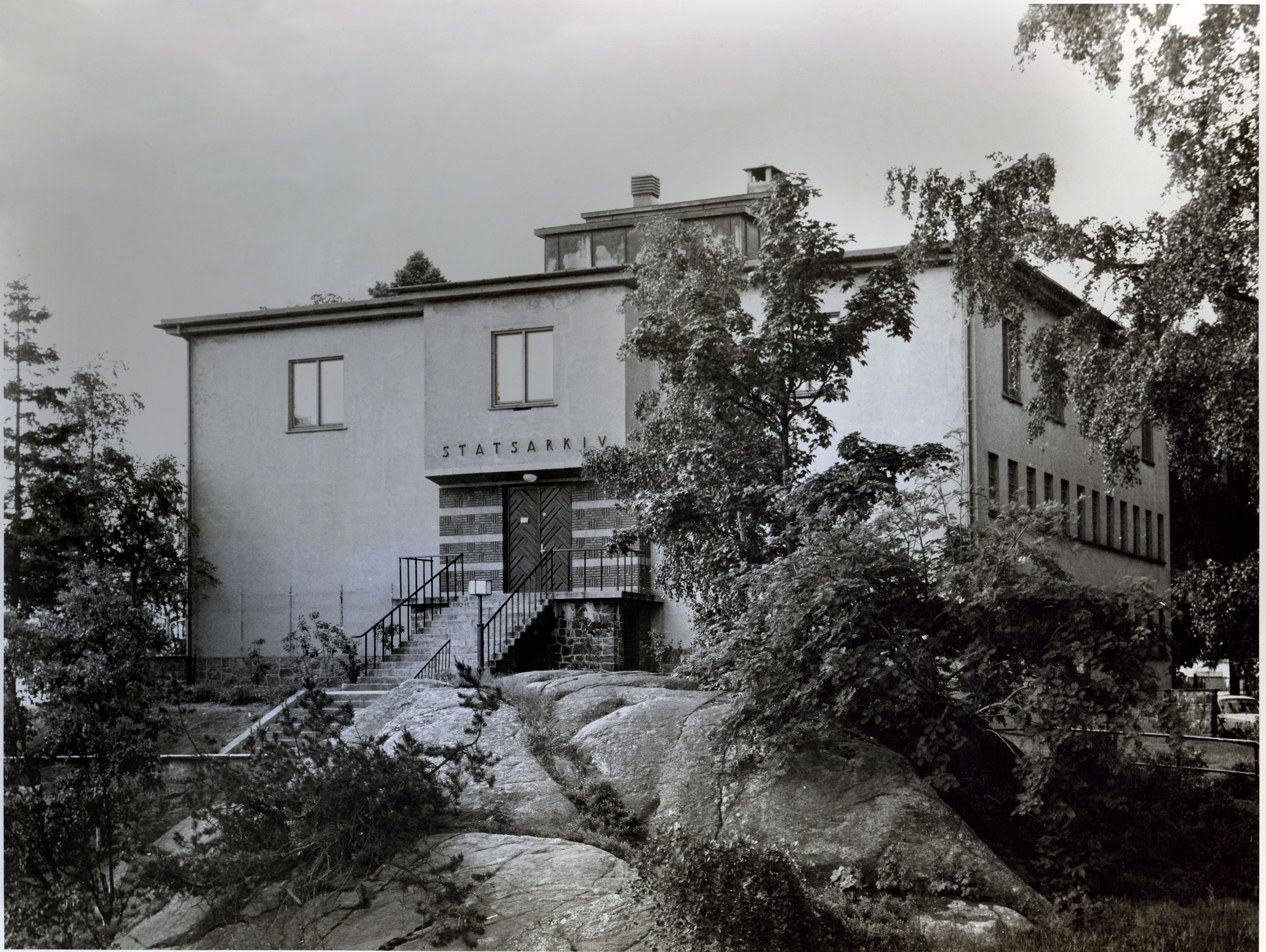
Former facilities at Bellevue, depicted in 1969
