= Bälinge Church =

Coordinates: 59°56′45″N 17°31′46″E

- Bälinge kyrka
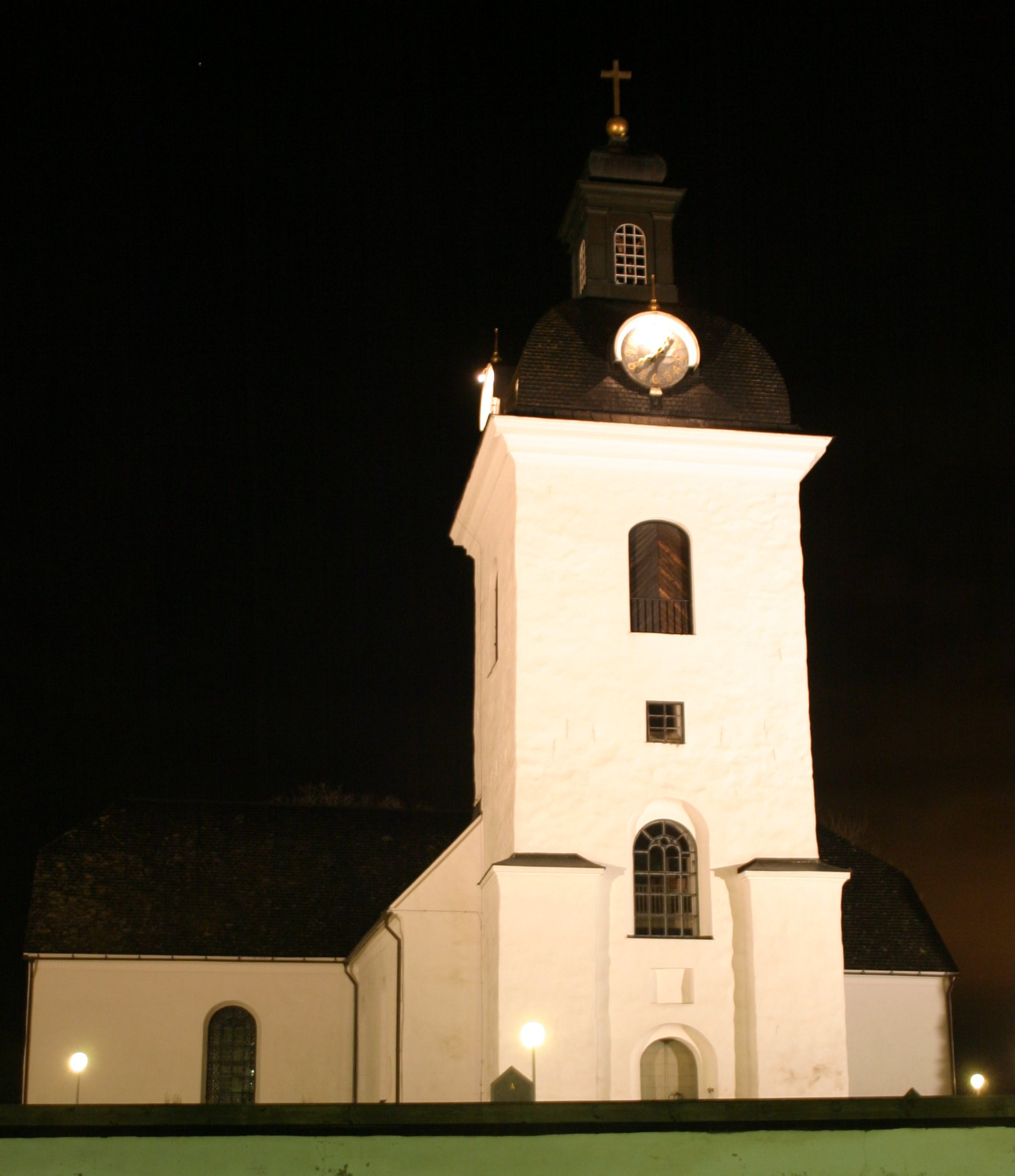
- Bälinge Church in 2005
- Bälinge Church
- Location: Bälinge
- Country: Sweden
- Denomination: Church of Sweden

History
- Consecrated: Middle Ages

Administration
- Diocese: Uppsala
- Parish: Bälingebygden

Bälinge Church (Swedish: Bälinge kyrka) is a medieval church in Bälinge, Uppsala Municipality, Sweden. It is part of the Archdiocese of Uppsala (Church of Sweden).

== History and architecture ==
The church was built at the end of the 13th century and has been substantially altered on several occasions. It derives much of its present appearance from changes made during the 18th century and during a large reconstruction carried out in 1874-88.

The church interior contains two sets of murals, one dating from the early 15th century and another made later in the same century by the workshop of Albertus Pictor or an artist influenced by him. The church also contains two notable medieval altarpieces, one of which may originally have been placed in Uppsala Cathedral as a side altar.
