= Svenskt Diplomatarium =

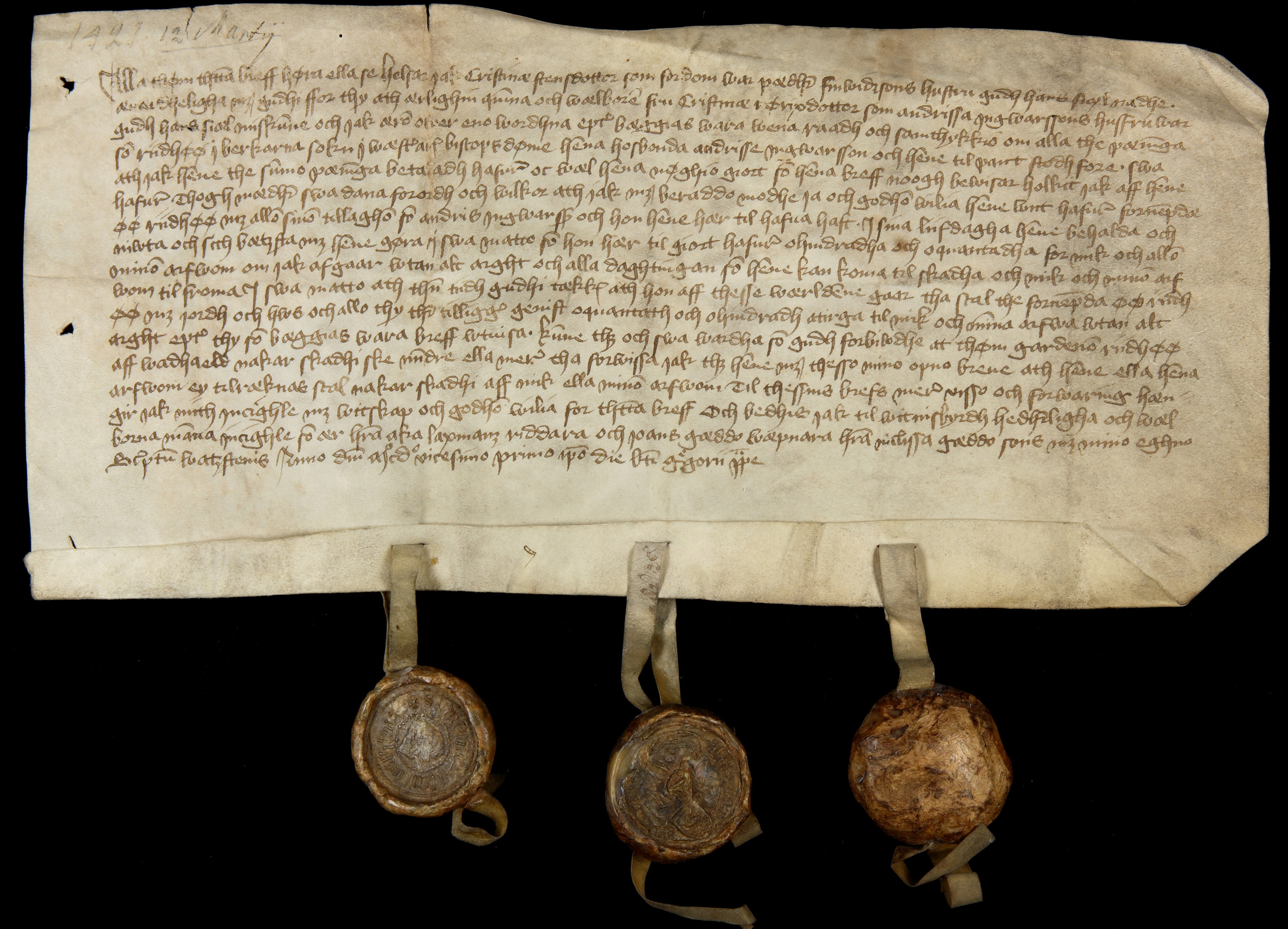

Svenskt Diplomatarium (also known under the Latin name Diplomatarium Suecanum) is a series of critical editions of medieval Swedish documents or documents pertaining to the history of Sweden (in Swedish, Latin and other languages). In early 2025, the series included over 44,000 letters from the Middle Ages, as well as other documents (diploms).

The Diplomatarium was started in the 1820s by the antiquarian Johan Gustaf Liljegren and the first edition was published in 1829. This first volume covered documents from the year 1285. In 1976 the collection went into the hands of a department within the Swedish National Archives. The editorial committee works through the material in chronological order, and the fascicle published in 2004 included documents dating to the 1370s.

Since 1999, the editorial committee has published the index of known medieval documents (including those from the periods not yet covered by the printed fascicles in a database available first on a compact disc, later online. Many documents are also available online in full text and with colour images of the originals.
