= National Archives of Norway in Trondheim =

Coordinates: 63°26′23″N 10°25′17″E

The National Archives of Norway in Trondheim (Norwegian: Nasjonalarkivet i Trondheim) is a division of the National Archives of Norway and is the regional archive for state institutions in Møre og Romsdal, Sør-Trøndelag, Nord-Trøndelag and Nordland. The State Archives in Trondheim was established in 1850 and is the oldest national archive in Scandinavia. On January 1 2026, the name was changed to the National Archives of Norway in Trondheim. Since autumn 2006, the archive has been located together with two other archives, a library and a museum in the Archive Centre at Dora 1, a World War II U-boat facility. The institutions collaborate in many respects, and among other things share a reading room.

The archive is tasked with maintaining and making available archival materials from the local and regional administrations. In addition, the archive accepts and stores private archives. It supervises the archivists in public agencies within its district, and in that connection assists public administrative entities with advice and guidance. It also works to foster interest in and spread awareness of the archives.

The State Archives in Trondheim maintains approximately 25,000 metres of shelved materials, which may be used in the reading room at the archive centre. The most used material in the state archives is also accessible through the Digital Archives by the National Archives of Norway.
