= National Archives of Norway in Oslo =

- Nasjonalarkivet i Oslo

Division overview
- Jurisdiction: Oslo, Akershus and Østfold
- Headquarters: Sognsvann, Oslo, Norway; 59°58′01″N 10°44′10″E
- Parent Division: National Archives of Norway
- Website: Official website

The National Archives of Norway in Oslo (Norwegian: Nasjonalarkivet i Oslo), before January 1 2026 the National Archives of Norway and the Regional State Archives in Oslo, is a state archive situated at Sognsvann in Oslo, Norway. Part of the National Archives of Norway, it is responsible for archiving documents from state institutions in the counties of Akershus, Oslo and Østfold. The collection includes 19.2 shelf-kilometers of material.

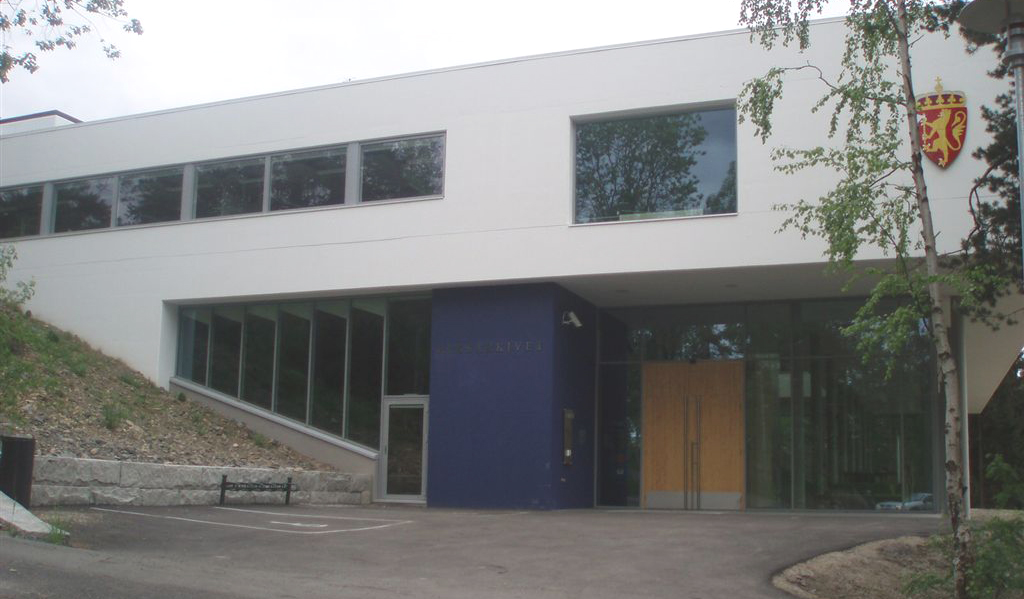
The archives are located at Sognsvann

The National Archives of Norway in Oslo is the institution responsible for preserving archive material from Norwegian state institutions, as well as contributing to the preservation of private archives.

The National Archives (Norwegian: Riksarkivet) was founded in 1817. Henrik Wergeland was appointed as the first national archivist in 1841. The Regional State Archives in Kristiania was created in 1914, and initially covered all of Eastern Norway and Agder. From 13 July 1917 the newly created Regional State Archives in Hamar took over documents from Oppland and Hedmark. The name the Regional State Archives in Oslo was adopted in 1924. With the opening of the Regional State Archives in Kristiansand in 1934, documents from Agder was moved there. The final demerger took place in 1994, when the Regional State Archives in Kongsberg took over documents from Buskerud, Telemark and Vestfold. On January 1 2026, the National Archives of Norway and the Regional State Archives were merged and named the National Archives of Norway in Oslo.
