= National Archives of Norway =

Norwegian government agency

Coordinates: 59.96635°N 10.73638°E

- Nasjonalarkivet
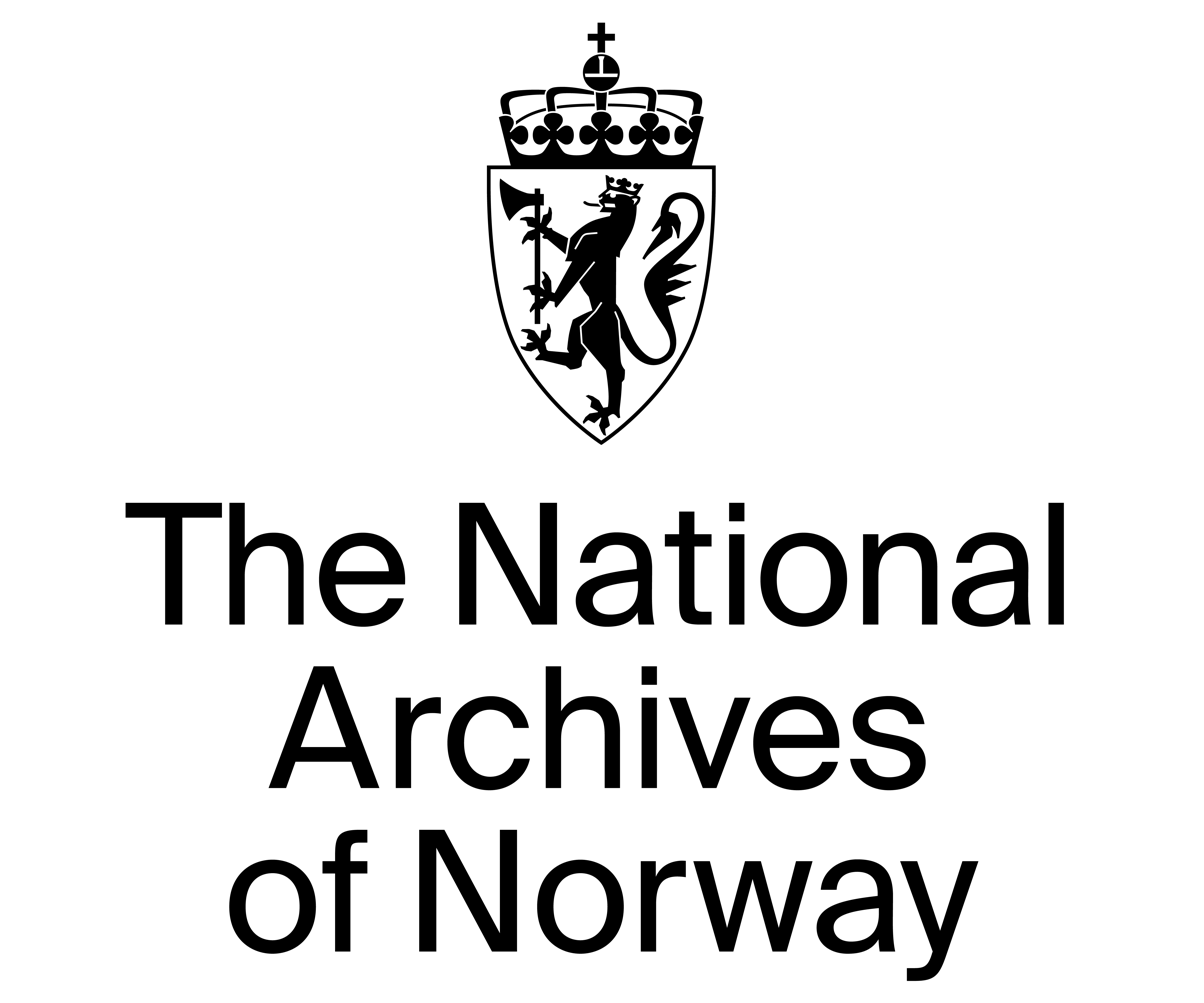

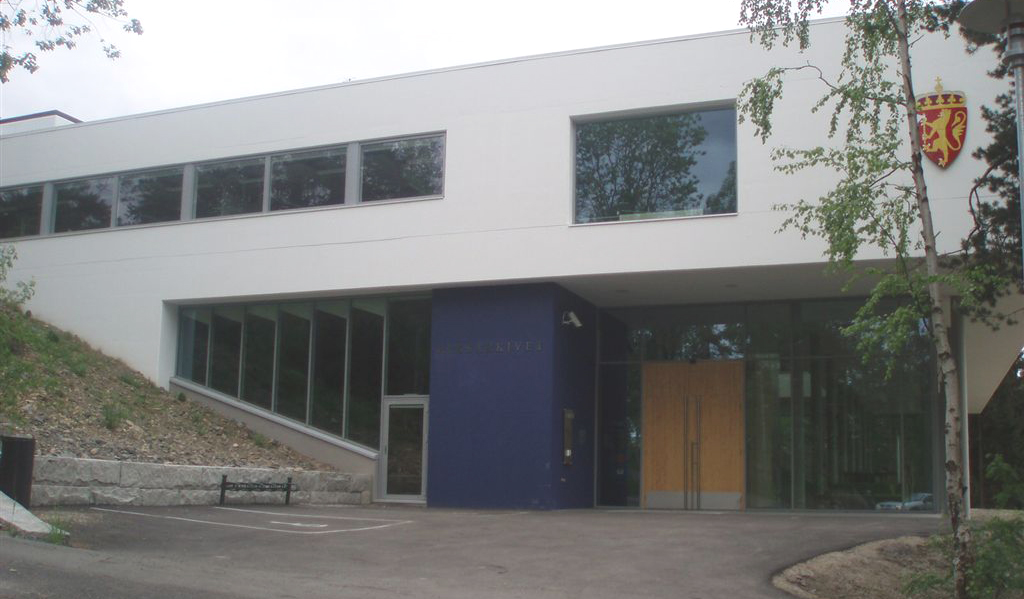

Agency overview
- Formed: 1817
- Headquarters: Oslo
- Employees: 326 (2019)
- Website: Official website

The National Archives of Norway (Norwegian: Nasjonalarkivet) is a Norwegian government agency that is responsible for keeping state archives, conducts control of public archiving, and works to preserve private archives. It is subordinate to the Ministry of Culture and Church Affairs and has eight locations, in addition to The Sámi Archives (Nasjonalarkivet Samisk arkiv) and The Norwegian Health Archives (Nasjonalarkivet Norsk helsearkiv). The organization had 326 employees in 2019 and about 120 kilometers (75 mi) of materials. The oldest complete document is from 1189. It is a letter (a so-called diploma) issued on 28 January 1189 by Pope Clement III (1187–1191) to all clergymen in Norway.

The National Archives of Norway preserve all central government papers from when they become 25 years old, as well as some archives from private individuals, companies and organizations. The ten locations are Bergen, Hamar, Kongsberg, Kristiansand, Oslo, Stavanger, Tromsø, Trondheim, Kautokeino, and Tynset.

The Digital Archives is a web site that publishes selected works. This includes census data from 1801, 1865, 1875, 1900 and 1910, a database of emigrants and scanned church, probate and court records. The agency publishes three magazines: Arkivmagasinet, Nytt fra Statsarkivet i Oslo and Bergensposten. The agency is regulated by the Archive Act of 1992. The archives are open to anyone, but there are restrictions on certain types of documents that may contain sensitive or personal information, or could pose a threat to national security. These documents are released to the public between 60 and 100 years after the date of publishing.

== See also ==
- List of national archives
