= Kvinnesaksnytt =

Journal

- Categories: Liberal feminism
- Publisher: Norwegian Association for Women's Rights
- First issue: 1950; 75 years ago
- Final issue: 2016; 9 years ago
- Country: Norway
- Language: Norwegian
- ISSN: 0802-7846
- OCLC: 477268380

Kvinnesaksnytt ("Women's Rights News") was a Norwegian liberal feminist journal on women's rights that included news and analysis of Norwegian and international women's rights issues, seen from the perspective of the liberal or mainstream women's rights movement. It was published by the Norwegian Association for Women's Rights, the country's main women's rights organization, from 1950 to 2016, and was Norway's main women's rights journal for 66 years. It was the successor of the association's earlier journal Nylænde (1887–1927), one of the most influential political magazines in Norway since the 1880s.

== History ==
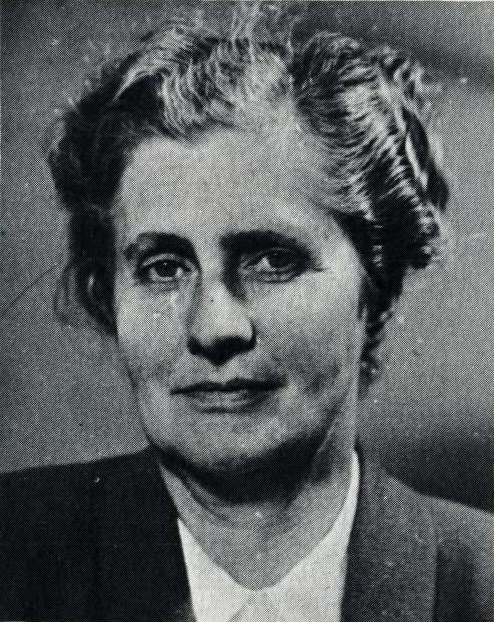
Dakky Kiær

The journal was established in 1950 on the initiative of NKF President Dakky Kiær as a successor to the association's former journal Nylænde, which was published 1887–1927 with Gina Krog and Fredrikke Mørck as editors. It was published as a printed journal, with the exception of the last issue, which only appeared electronically. The journal contained news and commentary on Norwegian, Nordic and international women's rights issues from the perspective of the bourgeois-liberal women's rights movement, often with a legal perspective, and was NKF's most important publication for 66 years. Among the issues the journal covered were marriage legislation, equal pay, gender roles, gender equality law, the establishment of the Gender Equality Council and the Gender Equality Ombud, gender-discriminatory advertising, CEDAW and gender and development.

The journal has also published several special issues, such as "Kvinnesak og kjønnsroller" (Women's rights and gender roles) by Kari Skjønsberg.

Like its owner NKF, the journal represented a liberal feminist perspektive. Eva Kolstad wrote in Kvinnesaknytt in 1959 that "what we want to achieve is a society where individual skills will determine the individual's path, not social norms and old traditions [...] Women's rights is therefore not a struggle against men. It is a struggle for greater human opportunities, for spiritual liberation."

The editors-in-chief included Ingerid Gjøstein Resi, Marit Aarum, Eva Kolstad, Kari Skjønsberg, Karin M. Bruzelius, Torild Skard and Margunn Bjørnholt.
