= Bruzelius =

Bruzelius is a Swedish surname. Notable people with the surname include:

- Anders Bruzelius, Swedish jurist
- Caroline Bruzelius (born 1949), American art historian
- Karin Maria Bruzelius (born 1941), Swedish-born Norwegian supreme court justice and civil servant
