= Sigrun Hoel =

Norwegian lawyer, academic and government official (born 1951)

Sigrun Hoel LL.M.

22nd President of the Norwegian Association for Women's Rights
- In office 1984–1988
- Preceded by: Karin M. Bruzelius
- Succeeded by: Irene Bauer

Gender Equality Ombud (acting)
- In office 1984–1984
- In office 1991–1991

Personal details
- Born: 10 October 1951 (age 74)
- Profession: Law professor

Sigrun Hoel (born 10 October 1951) is a Norwegian lawyer, academic, government official and feminist. She served as the 22nd President of the Norwegian Association for Women's Rights (NKF) from 1984 to 1988, succeeding supreme court justice Karin M. Bruzelius. Before she became the national President she was chair of the Oslo chapter from 1980 to 1984 and Vice President of NKF from 1982 to 1984. She was acting Gender Equality Ombud in 1984, 1988 and 1991.

She graduated with the cand.jur. (LL.M.) degree as the University of Oslo in 1977. She was involved in establishing the Gender Equality Ombud, the world's first of its kind, and joined the office of the Ombud as one of its first employees in 1979. She served as chief of staff to then-Ombud Eva Kolstad, her predecessor as NKF President, and to Kolstad's successor Ingse Stabel, and was acting Gender Equality Ombud in 1984, 1988 and 1991. She later joined Oslo and Akershus University College as a law professor. She was the Norwegian member of the planning committee for the Nordic conference Nordic Forum in 1988.
