= Schjoldager =

Schjoldager is a Norwegian and Danish surname. Notable people with the surname include:

- Dorothea Schjoldager (1853–1938), Norwegian feminist
- Eva Gram Schjoldager (born 1966), Danish actress and child star
- Mette Schjoldager (born 1977), Danish badminton player
