= National Association for Women's Suffrage =

National Association for Women's Suffrage may refer to:

- National Association for Women's Suffrage (Denmark)
- National Association for Women's Suffrage (Norway)
- National Association for Women's Suffrage (Sweden)
