= Skjønsberg =

Skjønsberg is a surname. Notable people with the surname include:

- Kari Skjønsberg (1926–2003), Norwegian writer
- Morten Skjønsberg (born 1983), Norwegian footballer
- Simen Skjønsberg (1920–1993), Norwegian journalist
- Tor Skjønsberg (1903-1993), Norwegian resistance leader
