= Aarum =

Aarum is a Norwegian surname. Notable people with the surname include:

- Anders Aarum (born 1974), Norwegian jazz pianist
- Marit Aarum (1903–1956), Norwegian economist, liberal politician, civil servant, and feminist
