= Anna Gjøstein =

Norwegian women's right pioneer (1869–1956)

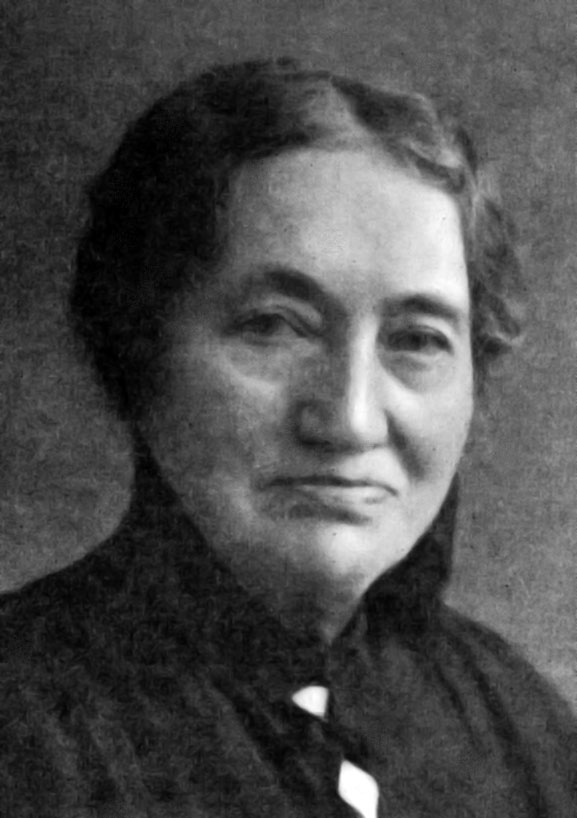
- Born: 15 June 1869; Ås, Norway
- Died: 6 January 1956 (aged 86); Stavanger
- Known for: Women's rights pioneer
- Political party: Labour Party; Social Democratic Labour Party of Norway
- Spouse: Johan Gjøstein
- Children: Ingerid Gjøstein Resi

Anna Gjøstein (15 June 1869 – 6 January 1956) was a Norwegian proponent for women's rights.

== Personal life ==
Gjøstein was born in Ås on 15 June 1869, a daughter of Ole Andersen Moberg and Ovidia Simensdatter Skræmma. While she was a child, the family moved to Christiania where she attended Sandbergs pikeskole. She travelled to Michigan in the United States with her fiancee Johan Gjøstein, and they married in 1888. In 1889 they moved back to Norway and settled in Stavanger. They were the parents of Ingerid Gjøstein Resi.

== Career ==
Settled in Stavanger, Gjøstein was a co-founder and leader of Stavanger Kvinnesaksforening and Kvinnelig arbeiderforening in 1899, and the Stavanger chapter of National Association for Women's Suffrage (Landskvinnestemmerettsforeningen) in 1900. From 1907 to 1912 she represented the Norwegian Labour Party's Women's Federation as correspondent for the international socialist women's movement. She was a delegate from the Women's Federation to the International Socialist Women's Conferences in Stuttgart 1907, and in Copenhagen in 1910. She was elected member of the city council in Stavanger from 1905 to 1913. A member of the Labour Party, after the split in 1921 (due to the Labour Party joined Comintern in 1919), she joined the Social Democratic Labour Party of Norway (Norges Socialdemokratiske Arbeoderparti), and rejoined the Labour party when the parties merged again in 1927.

She was engaged in education of housewives, and in 1927 she initiated the establishment of Stavanger Mødrehygienekontor (to inform women on contraception).

Gjøstein died on 6 January 1956.
