= Tove Smaadahl =

Norwegian politician

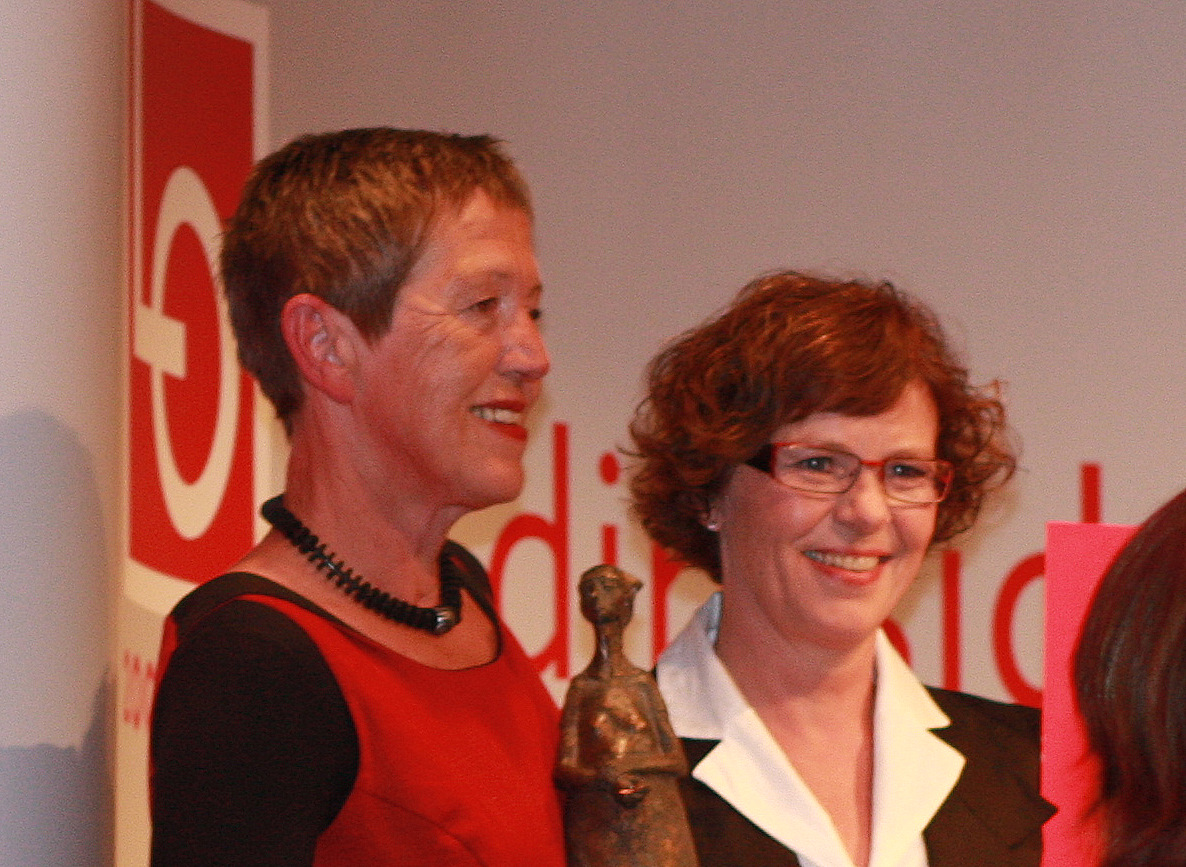
Tove Smaadahl accepting the Gender Equality Prize of the Norwegian Confederation of Trade Unions

Tove Smaadahl (born 23 January 1954) is a Norwegian Labour Party politician and organisation leader, known for her work to prevent violence against women. She is executive director of the Crisis Centre Secretariat, having held the position since 1999. She is also involved in politics for the Labour Party.

She has received several prizes for her work against violence against women, including the 2008 Zola Priza, the 2009 Gender Equality Prize of the Norwegian Confederation of Trade Unions (on behalf of the Crisis Centre Secretariat), and the 2012 Gina Krog Prize.
