= Gro Hagemann =

Norwegian historian (born 1945)

Gro Hagemann (born 3 September 1945) is a Norwegian historian.

She was born in Oslo and completed her Doctor of Philosophy degree in 1989 with the thesis Lavtlønnsyrker blir til. Kvinnearbeid og kjønnsskiller i søm og telekommunikasjon 1870–1940. She has been a professor at the University of Oslo since 1992. Hagemann is a member of the Norwegian Academy of Science and Letters and from 1990 to 1993 she chaired the Norwegian Historical Association. Hagemann has twice held residential fellowships (Fall 1992, Spring 1996) at the Swedish Collegium for Advanced Study in Uppsala, Sweden. She was awarded the Gina Krog Prize in 2009.

Among her most important publications are Skolefolk. Lærernes historie i Norge (1992), Kjønn og industrialisering (1994) and Det moderne gjennombrudd 1870–1905 (1997, volume nine of Aschehougs Norgeshistorie).

== Life and work ==
Hagemann grew up in Frogner, Oslo. She first studied sociology and was greatly inspired by the historical works of Max Weber. She majored in 1973 on political disputes over working conditions for women in the early 20th century.

After majoring, she was appointed in 1974 as a scientific assistant to Sofie Rogstad at the Private Archives Commission (now the National Archives) in connection with a project for the registration of women's history archives, which is considered the start of women's history as a field of research in Norway.

She received her doctorate in 1989. She was a researcher at the Institute for Social Research from 1992 to 1996 and simultaneously held an adjunct professorship at the Center for Women's Studies. In 1996, she was appointed professor of history at UiO.

== publications ==
- Low-wage jobs are created: women's work and gender differences in sewing and telecommunications 1870–1940, doctoral dissertation (1989)
- School People: The History of Teachers in Norway (1992)
- Gender and Industrialization (1994)
- The Modern Breakthrough 1870–1905, volume 9 in Aschehoug's History of Norway (1997)
- Feminism and history writing – impressions from a journey, Universitetsforlaget (2003)
- Twentieth-century housewives meanings and implications of unpaid work, (med Hege Roll-Hansen), Unipub forlag (2005)
- With a gender perspective on Norwegian history from the Viking Age to the turn of the 2000s (With Kari Melby ; Hilde Sandvik et al.) Cappelen (2005)
