= Irene Bauer =

Norwegian politician

23rd President of the Norwegian Association for Women's Rights
- In office 1988–1990
- Preceded by: Sigrun Hoel
- Succeeded by: Siri Hangeland

Personal details
- Born: 20 March 1945
- Died: 13 June 2016 (aged 71)
- Party: Labour Party
- Occupation: civil servant and politician

Irene Bauer (20 March 1945 – 13 June 2016) was a Norwegian senior government official, Labour Party politician and feminist. She served as president of the Norwegian Association for Women's Rights from 1988 to 1990. She also served as a political adviser to the Parliamentary Group of the Labour Party and as the (politically appointed) Private Secretary (now known as Political Adviser) to Minister of Trade and Industry Finn Kristensen in 1989. She served as a Director in the Ministry of the Environment from 1997. She has also worked at the Ministry of Petroleum and Energy. She was the mother of the noted comedian Thomas Giertsen.
