= Anders Bruzelius =

Swedish lawyer

Anders Sommar Bruzelius (14 November 1911 – 11 October 2006) was a Swedish jurist, judge and an early collaborator of Ruth Bader Ginsburg.

He earned his jur.kand. (JD) at Stockholm University in 1934, and was a judge on Lund District Court from 1953. He lectured at the law faculty of Lund University from 1948. During the 1960s he collaborated with Ruth Bader Ginsburg, who spent some months in Sweden to co-author the book Civil Procedure in Sweden with him. Bruzelius and Ginsburg were both appointed as honorary doctors at the Lund law faculty in 1969.

Anders Bruzelius was the father of Norwegian supreme court justice and president of the Norwegian Association for Women's Rights, Karin M. Bruzelius. Ginsburg became a close friend of the Bruzelius family; Karin M. Bruzelius noted that "by getting close to my family, Ruth realized that one could live in a completely different way, that women could have a different lifestyle and legal position than what they had in the United States."

== Bibliography ==
- Anders Bruzelius: Rättskunskap, Gleerup, Lund 1959
- Anders Bruzelius och Ruth Ginsburg: Civil Procedure in Sweden, Martinus Nijhoff, Haag 1965
- Anders Bruzelius, Erik Wångstedt och Marie-Louise Norking: Kortfattad engelsk-svensk juridisk ordbok
- Anders Bruzelius: Doctorinnan Erica Sommar född Liebman, Bruzelianska släktföreningen, Södra Sandby 1981
- Anders Bruzelius and Jan Nasanius: Socialtjänstens termer och begrepp: social ordbok, Skeab/Håkan Ohlson, Lund 1982
