= Clara Ottesen =

Norwegian government official, economist, aid worker and politician

19th President of the Norwegian Association for Women's Rights
- In office 1968–1972
- Preceded by: Eva Kolstad
- Succeeded by: Kari Skjønsberg

Personal details
- Born: 1911
- Died: 1997 (aged 85–86)
- Occupation: economist and politician

Clara Ottesen (October 30, 1911 – May 8, 1997) was a Norwegian government official, economist, aid worker and politician.

She earned the cand.oecon. degree in 1938 and was employed as a senior civil servant in the central government administration. She worked for the Ministry of Supply and Reconstruction and the Ministry of Social Affairs, before she joined the Ministry of Family and Consumer Affairs in 1956. During the 1950s and 1960s she was a key government official within social affairs and gender equality policies in Norway. She served as a United Nations development expert in East Pakistan (now Bangladesh) from 1962 to 1964, resident in Dhaka, where she worked to develop programs to address the position of women in the then-Pakistani province.

She was Second Vice President of the Norwegian Association for Women's Rights from 1966 to 1968 and President from 1968 to 1972, in succession to Eva Kolstad. She was a board member of the International Alliance of Women from 1967 to 1973. From 1971 she was a member of the Executive Board of the European Movement in Norway, that was headed by former Foreign Minister Svenn Stray at the time.
