= Anne Hege Grung =

Norwegian priest

33rd President of the Norwegian Association for Women's Rights
- Incumbent
- Assumed office 2020
- Preceded by: Karin Maria Bruzelius

Personal details
- Born: 4 November 1965 (age 60)

Anne Hege Grung (born 4 November 1965) is a Norwegian professor of interreligious studies and a feminist, and the President of Norway's preeminent women's and girls' rights NGO, the Norwegian Association for Women's Rights (NKF). In 2020, she succeeded supreme court justice Karin M. Bruzelius as NKF President.

== Academic career ==
Grung is (full) professor of interreligious studies at the University of Oslo and is known for her research on interfaith and human rights dialogue, especially Christian–Muslim dialogue; her work focuses especially on the status of women in religious communities, including violence against women. Grung is a member of the theological committees of the Church of Norway and the Church of Sweden.

She was awarded the prize "theologian of the year" by Norsk kvinnelig teologforening in 2002 and the prize Brobyggerprisen in 2003.

== President of the Norwegian Association for Women's Rights ==
Grung was elected as the 33rd President of the Norwegian Association for Women's Rights (NKF) in 2020, in succession to supreme court justice Karin M. Bruzelius.
