= Joint Organization of Nordic Women's Rights Associations =

- Nordiska kvinnosaksföreningars samorganisation
- Founded: 1916
- Dissolved: 1980s
- Purpose: Gender equality
- Headquarters: Stockholm, Sweden
- Methods: Law reform, political advocacy

The Joint Organization of Nordic Women's Rights Associations (Swedish: Nordiska kvinnosaksföreningars samorganisation, NKS) was an umbrella organization for the liberal women's rights movement in the Nordic countries. It was founded in Stockholm in 1916.

The member organizations included the Fredrika Bremer Association, the National Council of Swedish Women, the Norwegian Association for Women's Rights, the Danish Women's Society, and the Icelandic Women's Rights Association. The member organizations were also members of either the International Alliance of Women or the International Council of Women.

The bylaws were adopted at the Nordic Women's Rights Congress in Stockholm in 1916 and stated that national women's rights associations could become members. Its secretariat was hosted by the Fredrika Bremer Association in Stockholm.

The organization became defunct in the 1980s, but the key former member organizations still cooperate through the International Alliance of Women or the International Council of Women.
