= Signe Swensson =

Norwegian politician (1888–1974)

Signe Swensson MP
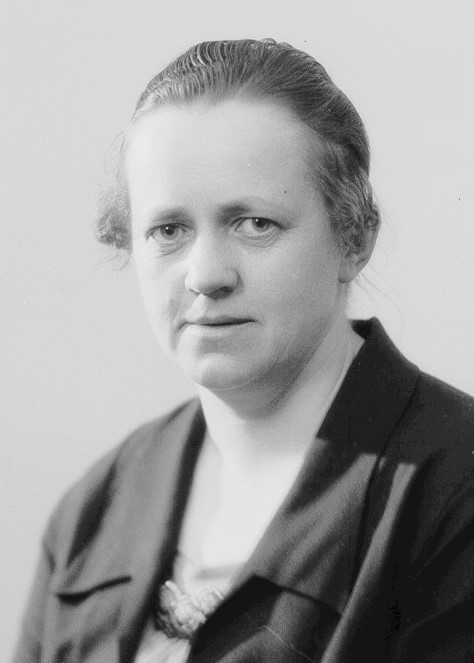

Member of the Norwegian Parliament
- In office 1931–1936
- Constituency: Trondheim and Levanger

17th President of the Norwegian Association for Women's Rights
- In office 1956–1956
- Preceded by: Marit Aarum
- Succeeded by: Eva Kolstad

Personal details
- Born: 23 November 1888
- Died: 22 April 1974 (aged 85)
- Party: Conservative Party
- Occupation: Physician, politician

Signe Swensson (23 November 1888 in Trondhjem – 22 April 1974) was a Norwegian physician and politician for the Conservative Party of Norway. She served as a Member of Parliament from 1931 to 1936 and as president of the Norwegian Association for Women's Rights in 1956.

Originally trained as a teacher at Oslo Teacher's College in 1912, she got her cand.med. degree in 1922, and worked as a district physician in Frøya Municipality before settling in Trondhjem as a specialist in skin diseases in 1927.

She was president of the Norwegian Association of Female Professionals 1936–46, member of the city council of Trondheim 1937-47 and president of the Norwegian Association for Women's Rights.

Her father was Swedish-born businessman Pehr Gustaf Swensson and her brother was physician Nils Victor Swensson.
