= Margarete Bonnevie =

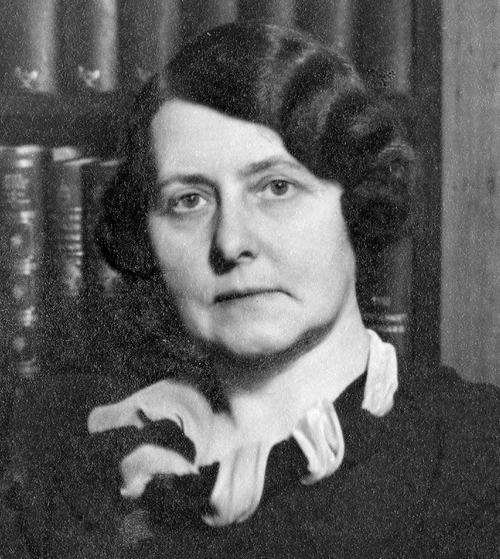
- Margarete Bonnevie

13th President of the Norwegian Association for Women's Rights
- In office 1936–1946
- Preceded by: Kitty Bugge
- Succeeded by: Dakky Kiær

Personal details
- Born: Margarete Ottilie Skattebøl; 13 December 1884 Nesbyen, Norway
- Died: 28 March 1970 (aged 85) Oslo, Norway
- Party: Liberal Party
- Spouse: Thomas Bonnevie
- Occupation: Author, politician

Margarete Ottilie Bonnevie (née Skattebøl) (13 December 1884 – 28 March 1970) was a Norwegian author, women's rights advocate and politician for the Liberal Party of Norway. A liberal feminist, she served as the 13th President of the Norwegian Association for Women's Rights (NKF) from 1936 to 1946 and is credited with reviving the liberal women's rights movement in the 1930s. Bonnevie said that NKF should work for solutions that are in the best interest of all women and society, "be the captain who keeps a steady course" in the struggle for equality and "set out the main policy objectives and seek to get the government, parliament and local government bodies to implement the reforms that are required."

== Biography ==
She was born at Nesbyen in Buskerud, Norway. She was a daughter of Conservative Party leader, Supreme Court Justice and Member of Parliament Ole Larsen Skattebøl (1844–1929) and Karen Christine Poppe Rømcke (1854–1932). She grew up in Hallingdal and was educated as a French language translator. She worked from 1906 to 1913 as French correspondent for Norsk Hydro.

In 1913, she married Supreme Court judge Thomas Bonnevie (1879-1960), son of cabinet minister Jacob Aall Bonnevie. He was also the brother of professor Kristine Bonnevie (1872–1948) and jurist Carl Bonnevie (1881-1972).

She was president of the Norwegian Association for Women's Rights 1936–1946, and is credited with reviving the women's movement in the 1930s. She also served as a board member of the International Alliance of Women 1939–1949. She was a co-founder of the Human-Ethical Association in 1956, and a member of its first board until 1958. She also served as President of the Oslo branch of the women's association of the Liberal Party and as a deputy member of the Oslo City Council in the 1930s.

She also released a number of books. In 1932, she published her first and most notable book, Ekteskap og arbeide. Throughout the 1950s and 1960s, she participated in the debate on women's position and women's role. She continued to write articles in journals and in daily press throughout her life.

== Selected works ==
- Ord som lever : En samling av norske og utenlandske citater og slagord – (1928)
- Ekteskap og arbeide – (1932)
- Familiekrisen og botemidler mot den – (1935)
- Patriarkatets siste skanse – (1948)
- Fra mannssamfunn til menneskesamfunn – (1957)
- Forslag til lov om barnetilleggskasse for lønnstakere, fremsatt for Odelstinget 20. februar 1956 – (1956)
- Fra likestilling til undertrykkelse – (1964)

== Related reading ==
- Lønnå, Elisabeth (1996) Stolthet og kvinnekamp : Norsk kvinnesaksforenings historie fra 1913 (Oslo: Gyldendal) ISBN 8205244952
