= Norwegian Association for Women's Rights =

Norwegian feminist political organization

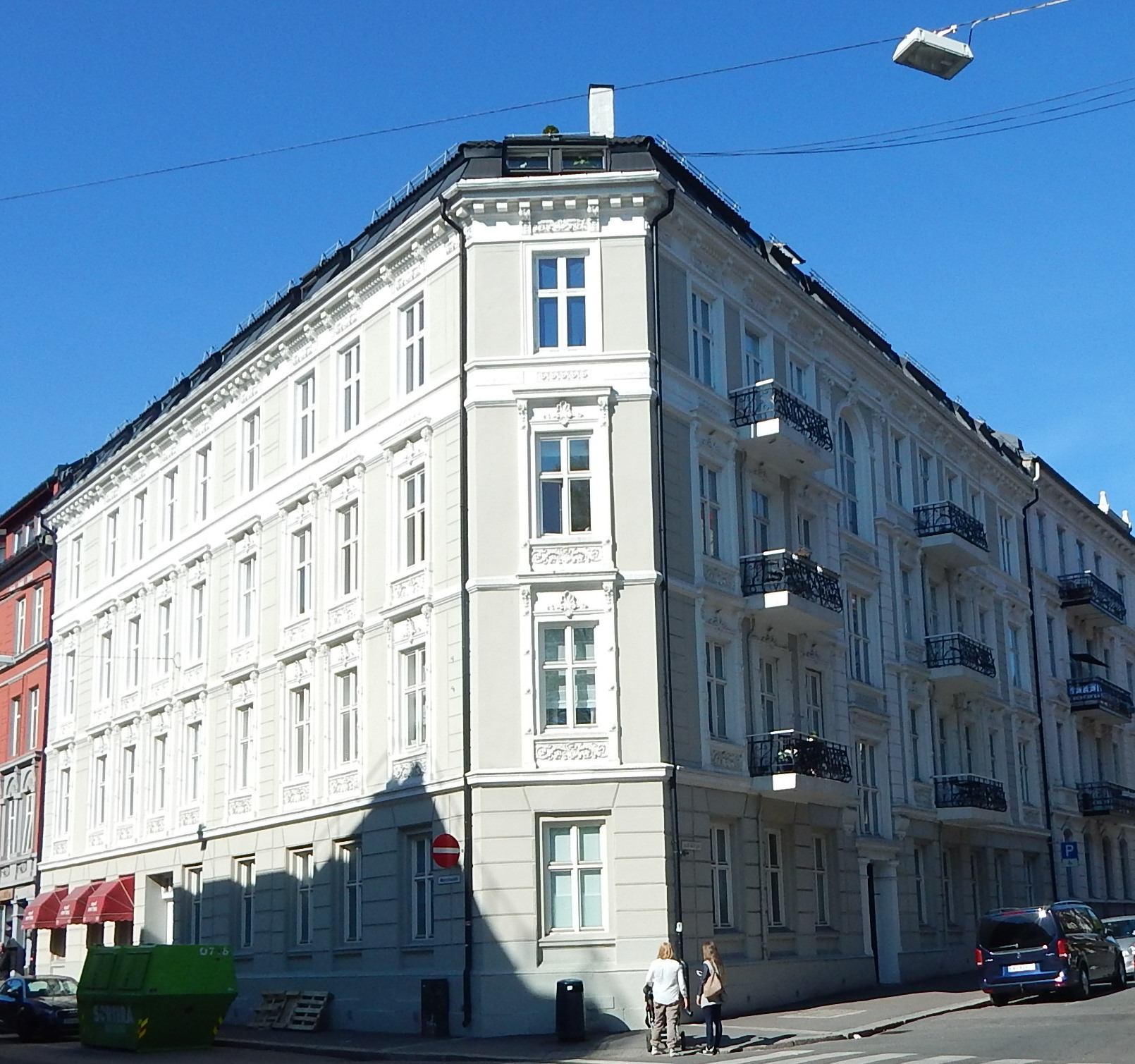
- NKF's offices in Majorstuen, Oslo
- Founded: 28 June 1884; 142 years ago
- Founders: Gina Krog and Hagbart Berner
- Purpose: Gender equality
- Headquarters: Majorstuen, Oslo
- Methods: Law reform, political advocacy
- President: Anne Hege Grung
- Affiliations: International Alliance of Women
- Website: kvinnesak.no

The Norwegian Association for Women's Rights (Norwegian: Norsk Kvinnesaksforening; NKF) is Norway's oldest and preeminent women's and girls' rights organization that works "to promote gender equality and all women's and girls' human rights through political and legal reform within the framework of liberal democracy." Founded in 1884, NKF is Norway's second oldest political organization after the Liberal Party. NKF stands for an inclusive, intersectional and progressive mainstream liberal feminism and has always been open to everyone regardless of gender. Headquartered at Majorstuen, Oslo, NKF consists of a national-level association as well as regional chapters based in the larger cities, and is led by a national executive board. NKF has had a central role in the adoption of all major gender equality legislation and reforms since 1884.

NKF was founded on the initiative of Gina Krog and Hagbart Berner by 171 prominent women and men of the progressive liberal establishment, including five Norwegian prime ministers, and was modeled after the predecessors of the League of Women Voters in the U.S. From the early years the association worked to bring women into the political mainstream. Traditionally the most important association of the Norwegian bourgeois-liberal women's rights movement and historically associated with the Liberal Party, NKF is today a big tent coalition with members from the centre-left to the centre-right. The association has always been Norway's most important mainstream feminist organization and has successfully campaigned for women's right to education, the right to vote, the right to work, the adoption of the 1978 Gender Equality Act, and the establishment of the Gender Equality Ombud. At the behest of NKF and affiliated organizations, Norway became the world's first independent country to introduce women's suffrage in 1913. NKF founded the Norwegian Women's Public Health Association.

In line with its roots in 19th century first-wave liberal feminism, political and legal reform remains its primary focus, and it has always concentrated on lobbying government bodies in a professional way. As a result of its focus on legal reform, the association has always attracted many lawyers and other academics. NKF members had key roles in developing the government apparatus and legislation related to gender equality in Norway; during the 1970s, the "Norwegian government adopted NKF's [equality] ideology as its own", and NKF's political tradition is closely linked to the concept of state feminism. In foreign policy NKF has a liberal internationalist outlook and generally supports Norwegian official foreign policy. Starting with the presidency of Eva Kolstad, from 1956, NKF focused strongly on the United Nations, and NKF members have been appointed to key UN bodies including UNCSW and the CEDAW Committee; the CEDAW convention remains an important focus of NKF. NKF is a member of the International Alliance of Women (IAW), which has general consultative status to the United Nations Economic and Social Council and participatory status with the Council of Europe, and is also generally considered as a sister organization of the National Organization for Women. NKF's logo is a stylized sunflower, adopted in 1894, based on the model of the liberal American suffrage movement.

== History ==
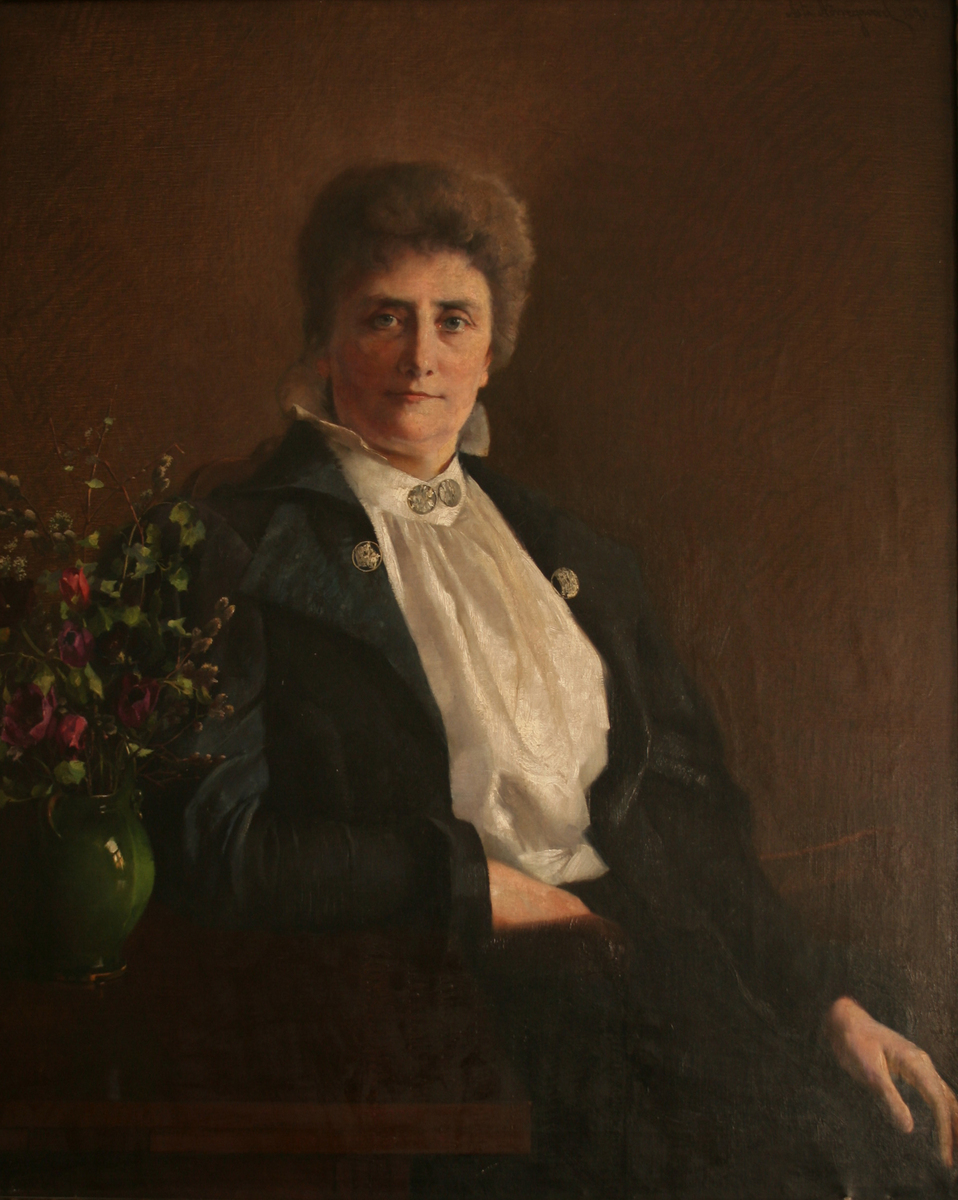
NKF's founder Gina Krog, a liberal politician and the principal leader of the struggle for women's right to vote in Norway

The Norwegian Association for Women's Rights was founded in 1884 by 171 prominent Norwegians, led by the liberal politician and women's rights pioneer Gina Krog and liberal Member of Parliament and the first editor-in-chief of Dagbladet Hagbart Berner. It was modeled after the American National Woman Suffrage Association, the predecessor of the League of Women Voters. The organization's founders included 87 men and 84 women, overwhelmingly prominent liberal public figures.

From its establishment, the organization was strongly associated with the Liberal Party; its 171 founders included five Norwegian prime ministers, several leaders of the Liberal Party, and many liberal Members of Parliament, as well as the editors of the large liberal newspapers and public figures such as novelist Alexander Kielland. Three of the first presidents of the organization, Anna Stang, Randi Blehr, and Fredrikke Marie Qvam, were all wives of Norwegian prime ministers. NKF grew out of overlapping milieus connected to the political elite and liberal media in Norway, particularly the women's rights association Skuld that had been founded the previous year by the first women to pursue higher education in Norway, but also Læseforening for Kvinder (founded by Camilla Collett in 1874), Nissen's Girls' School, Kristiania Lærerindeforening, the influential political and cultural magazine Nyt Tidsskrift, and the liberal newspaper Dagbladet. Membership has always been open to both women and men, and among the board members in the first years were several prominent lawyers such as the conservative prime minister Francis Hagerup and the attorney-general Annæus Johannes Schjødt. Historian Aslaug Moksnes has noted that NKF is a women's rights organization, not a women's organization; the distinction has always been important to NKF.

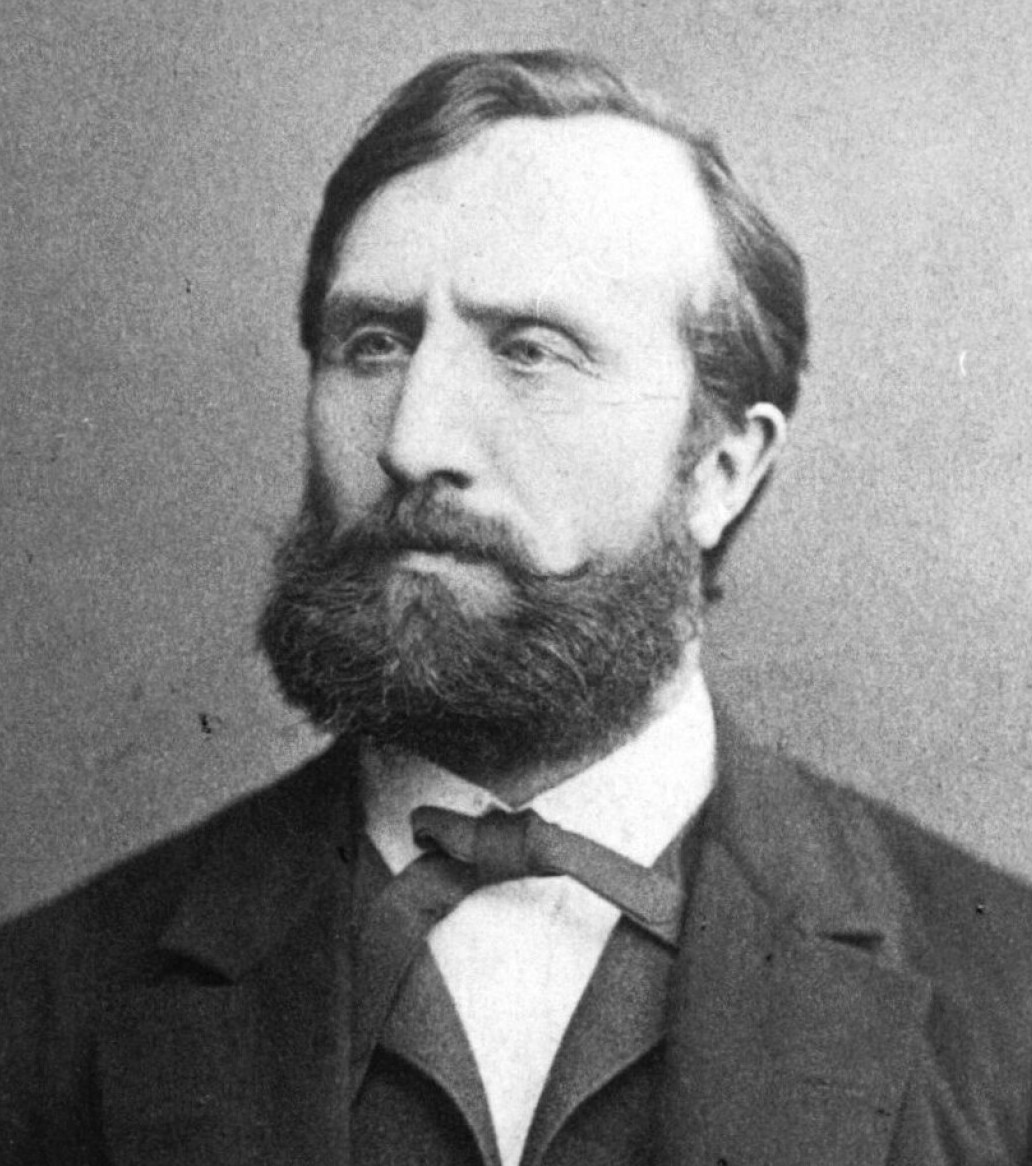
NKF's first President (1884–85) Hagbart Berner, a lawyer, liberal member of parliament and editor of the liberal daily Dagbladet

NKF is traditionally the main bourgeois or liberal women's rights organization in Norway. Cathrine Holst noted that "the bourgeois women's rights movement was liberal or liberal feminist. The bourgeois women's rights advocates fought for women's civil liberties and rights: freedom of speech, freedom of movement, the right to vote, freedom of association, inheritance rights, property rights and freedom of trade – and for women's access to education and working life. In short, women should have the same freedoms and rights as men."

Among the important causes that the NKF has campaigned for are women's suffrage (achieved in 1913), the right to work (in the 1930s), abolishment of the common taxing for spouses (the 1950s), right to equal schooling (the 1960s), the establishment of the Gender Equality Council (Norwegian: Likestillingsrådet) in 1972, the Gender Equality Ombud in 1978, and the adoption of the Gender Equality Act (1979). The government apparatus concerned with gender equality, including both the Gender Equality Council and the Gender Equality Ombud, were largely built by NKF members.

Key NKF members initiated the establishment of the National Association for Women's Suffrage and the Norwegian National Women's Council. NKF inherited the former's founding membership in the International Alliance of Women (IAW) in 1937.

The association also initiated the establishment of the Norwegian Women's Public Health Association (Norwegian: Norske Kvinners Sanitetsforening), a humanitarian organization, which grew to become Norway's largest women's organization with around 250,000 members at one point. Historically, NKF was the most important association of the Norwegian bourgeois-liberal women's movement (associated chiefly with the Liberal Party), in contrast to the labour women's movement (associated with the Labour Party), and was traditionally dominated by liberal women from the upper and educated middle class, as well as by liberal men. With the increasing reformism of the Labour Party, many Labour politicians joined NKF in the postwar era. Today, NKF is a nonpartisan organization.

The 1936 bylaws described NKF's main aim as "women's full equality with men in state and society" and NKF's working methods as influencing legislative processes, cooperating with the government and influencing public opinion.

During the presidency of Eva Kolstad (1956–1968), NKF became strongly involved in international cooperation through the United Nations and contributed significantly to early UN gender equality policies, and Kolstad was elected as a member and vice chair of the United Nations Commission on the Status of Women in 1968, the year she stepped down as NKF President, after being nominated as the joint candidate of the Nordic governments. Kolstad later became a cabinet minister in Norway, the leader of the Liberal Party, and then the world's first Gender Equality Ombud. During the 1970s and 1980s, the lawyers Karin M. Bruzelius and Sigrun Hoel led the organization. Bruzelius became the first woman to head a government ministry as Permanent Secretary in 1989 and later became a Supreme Court Justice. Hoel served as the deputy Gender Equality Ombud during Kolstad's tenure and as acting Gender Equality Ombud.

In the early 1980s, NKF was responsible for the government-funded information campaign "Women and the election". In the late 1980s, NKF initiated the TV-aksjonen campaign to raise funds for "Women in the Third World", and NKF co-founded the campaign's successor Forum for Women and Development in 1995. During the presidency of diplomat and psychologist Torild Skard (2006–2013), the former chairman of UNICEF, NKF renewed its focus on the United Nations, and NKF initiated the establishment of the Norwegian Women's Lobby, the umbrella organization of the Norwegian women's movement. Skard was succeeded as president by Professor Margunn Bjørnholt in 2013, by the Norwegian Parliament's First Vice President Marit Nybakk in 2016, by Supreme Court Justice Karin M. Bruzelius in 2018, and by Professor Anne Hege Grung in 2020.

The organization had its offices in Sehesteds gate 1 in Oslo for many years and now has its offices in Majorstuveien 39 at Majorstuen in central Oslo.

NKF differed markedly from the second-wave feminist movement in its liberal and moderate political outlook, formal style of organization, emphasis on cooperation with the government and focus on legal and policy issues, and also in its membership dominated by lawyers and academics, prioritization of professional lobbying methods and lack of interest in grassroots activism. Elisabeth Lønnå describes NKF by 1970 as "an almost dignified organization" that had its "origins in the Liberal Party and had a liberal platform, centered on the main idea of equality for all citizens and based on the idea of fundamental human rights". Lønnå notes that NKF had long traditions, a clearly defined form of organization, an established network, well formulated policies and principles, and that it spent most of its resources on lobbying government bodies in a professional way. According to Lønnå it was the "only feminist organization that was primarily based on the idea of gender equality". In contrast to the many new feminist organizations that sprung up in the 1970s but quickly lost most of their membership, NKF was strengthened in the 1980s. The government's gender equality apparatus viewed NKF as its main civil society partner and recognised the association's historical role in spearheading the struggle for equality.

NKF has traditionally referred to its political platform as kvinnesak, a term that in this context means women's rights and that has always been associated with the liberal women's rights movement in Norway. However, supreme court justice and two-time NKF President Karin M. Bruzelius has noted that NKF has always used the term women's rights synonymously with the struggle for gender equality, the association's overarching aim since the 19th century. NKF expressed scepticism towards the term "feminism" as late as 1980 because it could foster "unnecessary antagonism towards men", but accepted the term some years later as it became the mainstream general term for the women's rights struggle in the western world. Today the tradition that NKF represents is generally known as liberal feminism in English. NKF works to represent the interests of all those who identify as women and girls.

Although it grew out of 19th century progressive liberalism, NKF, like modern liberal feminism itself, is not limited to liberalism in a modern party-political sense, and NKF is non-partisan and broadly representative of the democratic political spectrum from the centre-left to the centre-right; its members tend to be affiliated with parties like the social-liberal Liberal Party, the social democratic Labour Party, the reformist socialist Socialist Left Party, the centrist Green Party, the liberal-conservative Conservative Party, or the Centre Party. NKF seeks the centre ground and to speak for the majority of all those who identify as women and girls, and NKF has always sought broad political support among women and men for reforms aimed at improving women's rights, believing its nonpartisan approach is the most effective way to advocate for women's rights and obtain practical results. Norwegian supreme court justice and two-time NKF President Karin Maria Bruzelius has described NKF's liberal feminism as "a realistic, sober, practical feminism".

While NKF was modeled after a predecessor of the League of Women Voters in the U.S., it is also generally seen as the Norwegian counterpart of the National Organization for Women in the U.S.

== International work and affiliations ==
The United Nations has been a major focus of NKF since the presidency of Eva Kolstad starting in 1956. NKF is a member of the International Alliance of Women (IAW), having inherited the founding membership of its de facto subsidiary, the National Association for Women's Suffrage. IAW was the fourth organization to receive general consultative status with the United Nations Economic and Social Council in 1947. In its international work, particularly at the UN level, NKF cooperates with its sister organizations in the IAW family such as the Icelandic Women's Rights Association, the Danish Women's Society, the Fredrika Bremer Association, the Deutscher Frauenring and the All India Women's Conference. Several NKF members have served on the IAW international board, notably including NKF presidents Margarete Bonnevie, Eva Kolstad, Clara Ottesen, Karin M. Bruzelius and Margunn Bjørnholt. NKF was a founding member of the Joint Organization of Nordic Women's Rights Associations in 1916, and still cooperates with the other Nordic national women's rights associations through IAW.

== Policies ==
=== Basic vision: Gender equality ===
Since 1884, [NKF] has understood the struggle for women's rights as fundamentally the same issue as the struggle for gender equality in society. [NKF] has always been open to all people regardless of gender. [NKF] fights for gender equality and for all those who identify as women and girls.

— NKF

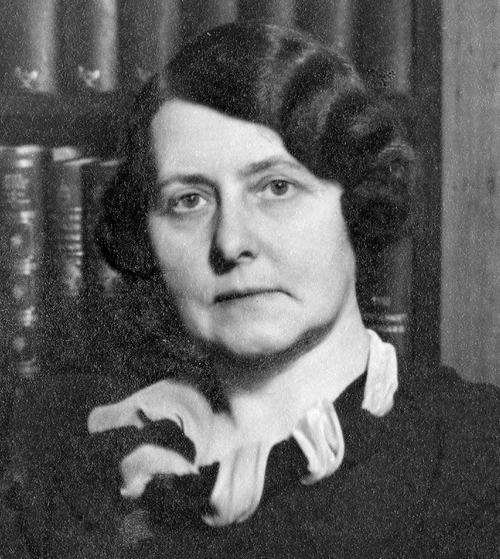
Margarete Bonnevie (NKF President 1936–1946) said that NKF will work for solutions that are in the best interest of all women and society, "be the captain who keeps a steady course" in the struggle for equality and "set out the main policy objectives and seek to get the government, parliament and local government bodies to implement the reforms that are required"

NKF is traditionally the main bourgois-liberal women's rights organization in Norway and applies a human rights approach to its work for gender equality. Today NKF stands for an inclusive, intersectional and progressive liberal feminism and works "to promote gender equality and women's and girls' human rights through political and legal reform within the framework of liberal democracy." NKF describes itself as "an inclusive and non-partisan feminist organization made up of women and men who champion the rights of all girls and women." NKF's main focus is women's political, legal, and human rights, and Harriet Bjerrum Nielsen notes that NKF has "always been liberal and involved in a broad range of issues." NKF focuses on "eliminating attitudes, laws and regulations that are discriminatory towards women and girls and which prevent gender equality".

NKF President Margarete Bonnevie said that NKF will work for solutions that are in the best interest of all women and society, "be the captain who keeps a steady course" in the struggle for equality and "set out the main policy objectives and seek to get the government, parliament and local government bodies to implement the reforms that are required;" accordingly NKF views itself as the leader of the women's movement and struggle for equality in Norway. NKF views gender equality as a human right and argues that women's rights and human rights for all are fundamentally the same issue. NKF has always understood the struggle for women's rights to be identical with the struggle for gender equality, the association's overarching aim since the 19th century.

=== Core issues ===
NKF works for the human rights of all girls and women and for a gender equal society. NKF's core issues include "women's political rights, legal equality, women's representation in politics, and gender equality in education, employment, and economic justice" and "violence against girls and women (and) the strengthening of the gender perspective in foreign, security, and development policies."

==== Political rights, legal equality and representation of women in politics ====
Political rights, legal equality and representation of women in politics is the most important traditional core focus of NKF.

==== Equal education, working life and economic justice ====
Equal education, working life and economic justice is the second traditional core focus of NKF.

==== Foreign policy ====
NKF's main focus in foreign policy is the strengthening of women's rights. NKF has a strong focus on the United Nations system. NKF played a key role in the development of women-focused development projects and initiated the establishment of what became the Forum for Women and Development. NKF is generally supportive of Norwegian official foreign policy, and in line with its liberal feminist political platform and bourgeois origins, the association maintained a pro-Western stance throughout the Cold War. NKF has never been pacifist; NKF founded the Norwegian Women's Public Health Association, originally intended as an affiliate of the Norwegian Red Cross that aimed to support the Norwegian military in a potential conflict with Sweden during the dissolution of the countries' union in 1905. NKF's non-partisan position meant that NKF consciously adopted a neutral stance on many issues not related to gender equality, especially issues that divided opinion among the political centre in Norway, such as Norwegian membership in the European Union. Clara Ottesen, the NKF President during the membership debate, was herself a member of the executive board of the European Movement in Norway at the time. NKF refused to support anti-nuclear campaigns in Norway from the 1970s, as it would be at odds with official Norwegian (and NATO) security policy during the Cold War, and argued that the issue was unrelated to women's rights.

==== Sexual and reproductive rights ====
NKF supports safe and legal abortion, birth control, and reproductive health education for all. NKF initiated the establishment of the NGO Sex og politikk that promotes sexual and reproductive health and rights domestically and internationally. In line with the liberal feminist focus on the "public world"—such as laws, political institutions and working life—NKF originally paid little attention to issues of sexuality, and this gradually changed during the 1960s and 1970s when the issue of abortion became important to the association.

==== Ending violence against women ====
NKF has worked to end violence against women since the 19th century. Since the 1980s the topic has become increasingly important for NKF. NKF has mostly focused on legal regulation of violence, and works closely with lawyers and scholars in the field of women's law. NKF worked to abolish the practice of government-sanctioned prostitution in the 19th century, but the association has focused less on this topic than radical organizations in the modern era. Traditionally liberal/mainstream feminists are critical of prostitution, although they may differ on the most appropriate means to help people exit prostitution and combat human trafficking. Alan Soble notes that "contemporary liberal feminists object to prostitution (...) primarily because much of it involves coercion and choices that are not autonomous." In the 21st century NKF supported the ban on buying sexual services in Norway. In line with its pragmatic perspective and emphasis on human rights, NKF has also been willing to listen to different perspectives in this complex area, with a main focus on combating human trafficking and exploitation. NKF and the women's rights movement pay attention to researchers in the field, acknowledge that the question of criminalization is complex, and emphasize that it must be discussed in a nuanced and academic manner, including from a human rights perspective. Among NKF's sister organizations within IAW there are differing opinions on whether criminalization is an appropriate means to help people exit prostitution and combat human trafficking. NKF's U.S. counterpart, NOW, has also been divided on this issue.

==== Gender and sexual diversity ====
NKF is part of the liberal women's rights movement and thus shares the mainstream feminist position on LGBT+ rights. NKF views LGBT+ rights as an integral part of feminism and the human rights framework NKF's work is based on, and opposes discrimination based on sexual orientation or gender identity in all areas, including homophobia and transphobia. NKF has always viewed itself as inclusive and non-discriminatory. Then-President Eva Kolstad wrote in 1959 that the struggle for women's rights is "a struggle for the free human" and in the 1960s Kolstad was an early advocate of gay rights. Nevertheless, during the 1970s the association showed little interest in lesbian rights and argued that lesbian issues did not concern NKF. Since the late 20th century NKF has more consistently adopted LGBT+-inclusive policies and a more intersectional approach. This is in line with developments in human rights law; for example, law professor, CEDAW expert and NKF member Anne Hellum has noted that the CEDAW committee views "women" as a complex and multidimensional category that includes lesbians and trans women, and that both groups are protected by the convention. For example, NKF supported legal protections against discrimination and hate speech on the basis of sexual orientation, gender identity and gender expression in the Penal Code in 2018. NKF's LGBT+-inclusive views are aligned with its parent organization, the International Alliance of Women (IAW) and with its sister organizations in the IAW family. During the 2021 session of the United Nations Commission on the Status of Women (CSW) NKF's parent organization, IAW, co-hosted a CSW forum together with NKF's Icelandic sister organization, the Icelandic Women's Rights Association, on how the women's movement could counter "anti-trans voices [that] are becoming ever louder and [that] are threatening feminist solidarity across borders." NKF's largest chapter, its Oslo branch, noted that "the anti-gender movement is now working systematically in a number of countries and in several international forums to reverse and undermine the rights of both women and sexual minorities" and that the association "stands in solidarity with international women's rights and LGBT+ organizations in the fight against these setbacks." In 2023 former IAW President Marion Böker participated in the podcast "Trans Inclusion in the Women's Movement", highlighting how the mainstream women's rights movement is trans-inclusive and how the exclusionary narrative that dominates much of the media is being driven by and playing into the hands of anti-democratic forces.

== Presidents ==
NKF's president is the highest national-level official and chairs the national board (landsstyret) and the executive board (sentralstyret). NKF's presidents have been:

No	Image	Name	Tenure	Background	Party
1		Hagbart Berner	1884–1885	Lawyer and Member of Parliament	Liberal
2		Anna Stang	1885–1886	Teacher, usually titled Statsministerinde ("Madam Prime Minister")	Liberal
3		Ragna Nielsen	1886–1888	Teacher, headmistress and liberal politician, also President of Riksmålsforbundet	Liberal
4		Anna Bugge	1888–1889	Lawyer and diplomat	Liberal
5		Ragna Nielsen	1889–1895	Teacher, headmistress and liberal politician, also President of Riksmålsforbundet	Liberal
6		Randi Blehr	1895–1899	Humanitarian leader, usually titled Statsministerinde ("Madam Prime Minister")	Liberal
7		Fredrikke Marie Qvam	1899–1903	Humanitarian leader, usually titled Statsministerinde ("Madam Prime Minister"), also President of the Norwegian Women's Public Health Association	Liberal
8		Randi Blehr	1903–1922	Humanitarian leader, usually titled Statsministerinde ("Madam Prime Minister")	Liberal
9		Aadel Lampe	1922–1926	Teacher and liberal politician, deputy member of parliament	Free-Minded Liberal
10		Fredrikke Mørck	1926–1930	Teacher and editor	Liberal
11		Anna Hvoslef	1930–1935	Aftenposten journalist	Conservative
12		Kitty Bugge	1935–1936	Union leader	Liberal
13		Margarete Bonnevie	1936–1946	Writer and liberal politician	Liberal
14		Dakky Kiær	1946–1952	Headmistress and liberal politician	Liberal
15		Ingerid Gjøstein Resi	1952–1955	Linguist and liberal politician	Liberal
16		Marit Aarum	1955–1956	Economist, civil servant and liberal politician	Liberal
17		Signe Swensson	1956	Physician and Member of Parliament	Conservative
18		Eva Kolstad	1956–1968	Cabinet minister, Liberal Party leader, Norway's first Gender Equality Ombud	Liberal
19		Clara Ottesen	1968–1972	Economist, civil servant, aid worker, UN expert	Liberal
20		Kari Skjønsberg	1972–1978	Associate professor of literature and Labour Party politician	Labour
21		Karin M. Bruzelius	1978–1984	Supreme Court Justice	
22		Sigrun Hoel	1984–1988	Lawyer and Gender Equality Ombud	
23		Irene Bauer	1988–1990	Labour Party politician, civil servant (Director in the Ministry of the Environment)	Labour
24		Siri Hangeland	1990–1992	Lecturer	SV
25		Bjørg Krane Bostad	1992–1994	Civil servant	
26		Kjellaug Pettersen	1994–1998	Civil servant (Special Adviser with the Ministry of Education)	
27		Siri Hangeland	1998–2004	Lecturer	SV
28		Berit Kvæven	2004–2006	Chief engineer at the Norwegian Climate and Pollution Agency, former vice president of the Liberal Party, Political Adviser to the Minister of Consumer Affairs and Administration (Eva Kolstad), former president of Tekna	Liberal
29		Torild Skard	2006–2013	Senior Researcher at the Norwegian Institute of International Affairs, former Member of Parliament, Deputy Permanent Secretary at the Ministry of Foreign Affairs and Chairman of UNICEF	SV
30		Margunn Bjørnholt	2013–2016	Professor of Sociology	Greens
31		Marit Nybakk	2016–2018	First Vice President of the Norwegian Parliament, Norway's longest-serving woman member of parliament of all time, former president of the Nordic Council	Labour
32		Karin M. Bruzelius	2018–2020	Supreme Court Justice	
33		Anne Hege Grung	2020–	Professor of Theology	

== Symbols ==
Masthead of Nylænde (version used 1901–1907)

NKF's logo is a stylized sunflower. It was adopted in 1894, based on the model of the liberal American suffrage movement led by Elizabeth Cady Stanton and Susan B. Anthony from the 1860s; by the late 19th century, the sunflower had become the main international symbol of women's suffrage. The logo was also used as the logo of NKF's journal Nylænde, edited by Gina Krog. NKF states that the sunflower represents the association's "roots in the first wave of feminism and our systematic work since 1884 to promote gender equality through constructive political reforms within the framework of liberal democracy".

== Journals ==
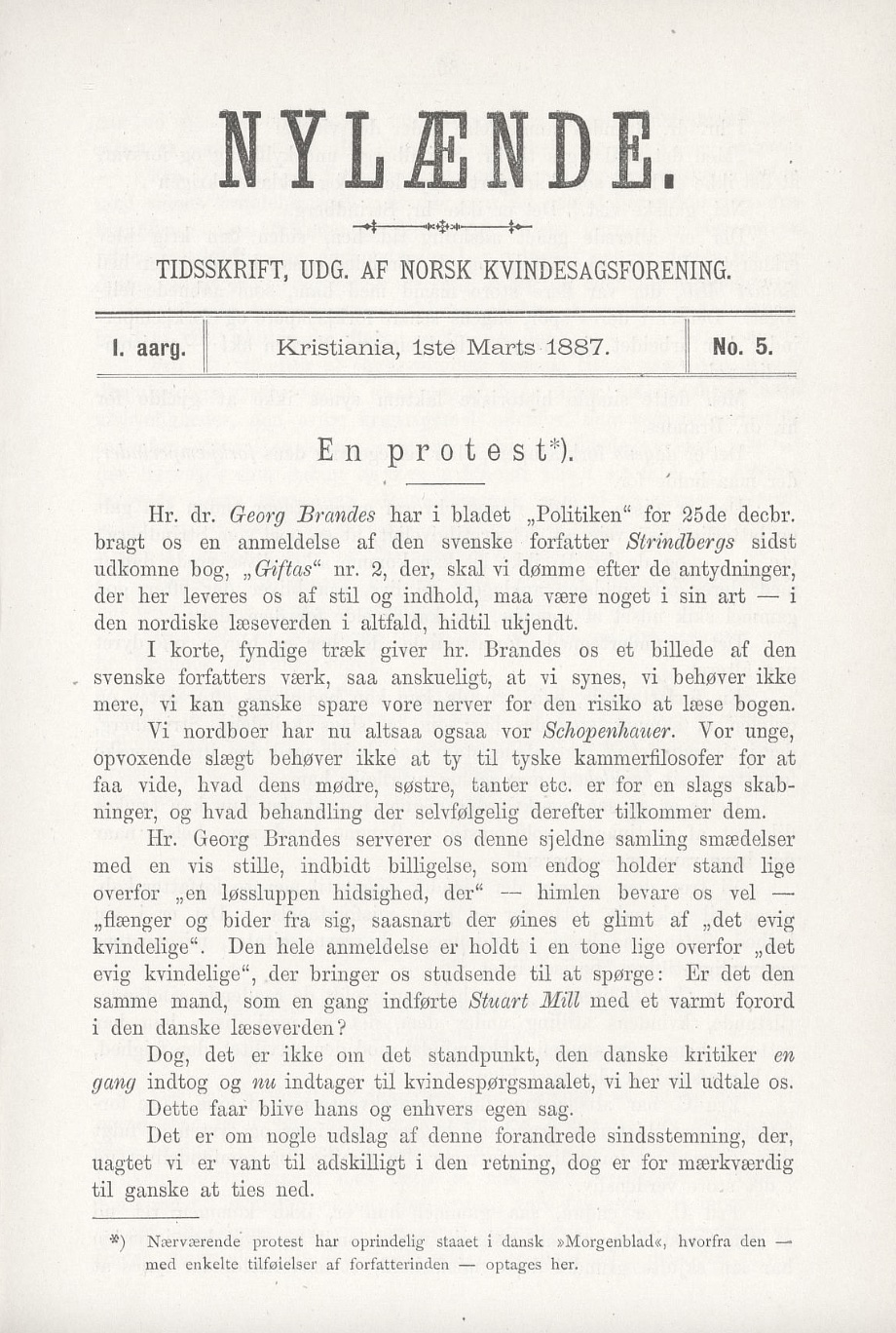
NKF's journal Nylænde 1 March 1887 with an article by Camilla Collett

NKF published the journal Nylænde (New Land) from 1887 to 1927, edited by Gina Krog until her death in 1916 and then by Fredrikke Mørck. Nylænde was the first women's rights journal in Norway and was regarded as one of the most influential political journals of the country in its time. It played a major role in the early women's rights movement and the struggle for women's suffrage. It was also a leading journal of literary criticism; Marius Wulfsberg has stated that "it was Gina Krog and her [Nylænde] reviewers who really made Ibsen famous."

From 1950 to 2016 NKF published the journal Kvinnesaksnytt (Women's Rights News) that included news and analysis of Norwegian and international women's rights issues. The editors of Kvinnesaksnytt included Ingerid Gjøstein Resi, Marit Aarum, Eva Kolstad, Kari Skjønsberg, Karin M. Bruzelius, Torild Skard and Margunn Bjørnholt.

== Awards ==
NKF's highest honour is its honorary membership, which was first awarded to Camilla Collett in 1884. Since 2009, NKF also awards the Gina Krog Prize, named after its founder.

=== Honorary members ===
- Camilla Collett 1884
- August Thorvald Deinboll 1896
- Aasta Hansteen 1906
- Gina Krog 1909
- Hagbart Berner 1909
- Amalie Hansen 1913
- Ragna Nielsen 1914
- Fredrikke Marie Qvam 1914
- Thora Storm 1914
- Anna Rogstad 1914
- Francis Hagerup 1914
- Alette Ottesen 1919
- Harriet Backer 1920
- Anna Bugge 1922
- Randi Blehr 1923
- Otto Blehr 1924
- Edvard Isak Hambro Bull 1924
- Dorothea Schjoldager 1924
- Aadel Lampe 1926
- Betzy Kjelsberg 1931
- Fredrikke Mørck 1934
- Katti Anker Møller 1939
- Margarete Bonnevie 1946
- Dakky Kiær 1954
- Signe Swensson 1954
- Eva Kolstad
- Ebba Haslund 1995
- Berit Ås 2009
- Aslaug Moksnes 2013
- Torild Skard 2014
- Gro Harlem Brundtland (2016)
- Helga Hernes (2018)

=== Gina Krog Prize ===
Since 2009, the association has awarded the Gina Krog Prize, named after its founder Gina Krog. The prize has been awarded to

- Historians Ida Blom, Gro Hagemann, Elisabeth Lønnå, Aslaug Moksnes and Elisabeth Aasen (2009)
- Filmmaker Anja Breien (2010)
- Tove Smaadahl (2012)
- Kirsti Kolle Grøndahl (2014)
- Amal Aden (2016)
- Nancy Herz, Sofia Nesrine Srour and Amina Bile (2018)
- Anne Hellum (2020)

== Literature ==
- Aslaug Moksnes (1984). Likestilling eller særstilling? Norsk kvinnesaksforening 1884–1913, Gyldendal Norsk Forlag, 296 pages, ISBN 82-05-15356-6
- Elisabeth Lønnå (1996). Stolthet og kvinnekamp: Norsk kvinnesaksforenings historie fra 1913, Gyldendal Norsk Forlag, 341 pages, ISBN 8205244952
- Norsk kvinnesaksforening gjennom 65 år: 1884–1949, 1950
- Dakky Kiær (1978). Norsk kvinnesaksforening i 1930-årene: med tilbakeblikk på tidligere virke og streiflys frem til 1977
- Alette Ottesen (1909). Beretning om Norsk kvindesagsforenings 25 aarige virksomhet: 28de juni 1884–28de juni 1909, Norsk Kvindesagsforening, 1909, 16 pages.
- Norske kvinder: en oversigt over deres stilling og livsvilkaar i hundredeaaret 1814–1914 (1914), pp. 75–81
- Anna Caspari Agerholt (1937). Den norske kvinnebevegelses historie. Oslo: Gyldendal Norsk Forlag.
- Norum, Jorun Margrethe Stangnæs (1971). Kvinner i organisasjoner på 1800-tallet: fra 'Skuld' til 'Norsk Kvindesagsforening'. Oslo.
- Nylænde (periodical, 1887–1927)
- Kvinnesaksnytt (periodical, 1950–2016)
