= Amal Aden =

Norwegian writer

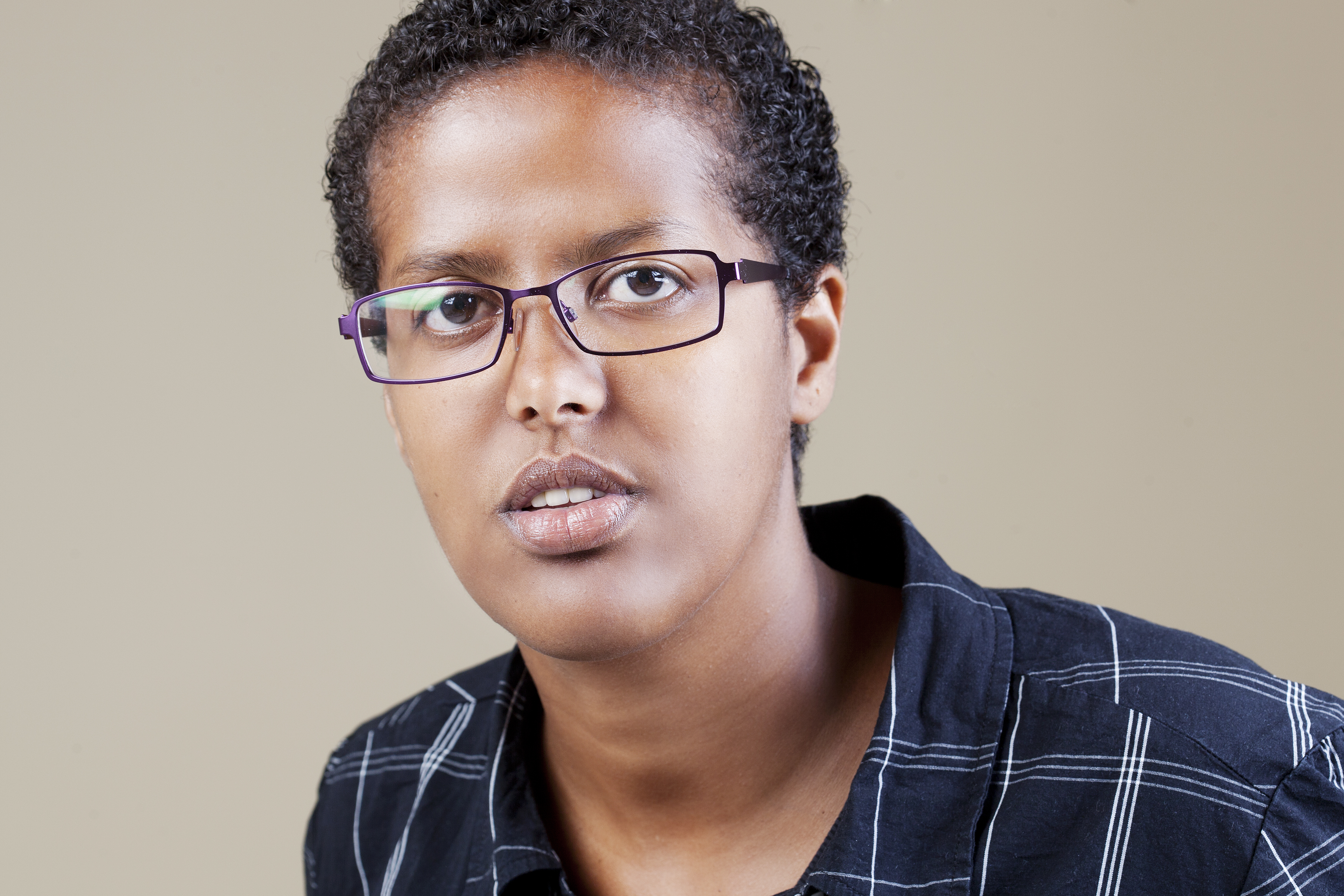
- Born: 1983 (age 42–43); Northern Somalia
- Occupations: Author, interpreter, lecturer
- Known for: Author and lecturer
- Notable work: Se oss (2008), ABC i integrering (2009), Min drøm om frihet (2009)
- Website: Amal Aden

Amal Aden (born 1983) is the pseudonym of a Somali–Norwegian writer. She is an author, lecturer and lesbian activist. Aden is substitute member of the Norwegian Press Complaints Commission and has been a contributor to the newspaper Dag og Tid since January 2013.

== Early and personal life ==
Aden was born in Somalia, and became an orphan at the age of four. She was illiterate, and immigrated to Norway through family reunification as a thirteen-year-old in 1996, after living as a street child for seven years. She struggled at first with the meeting of another culture, child protection and other public services which she claims were unable to help her. She ended up in the drug environment in the Oslo city district of Grønland, and lived on the streets of the same city periodically.

Today however, she is self-employed and works as an interpreter for the police, schools and other instances, as well as being an advisor and lecturer for municipalities and other instances. She is the mother of two twins and since 2002 she has lived in Hønefoss.

== Career ==
Amal Aden published her first book in 2008 and has published several books since. She has received several awards, first of them Zola-prisen (a Norwegian prize named after the French writer and intellectual Émile Zola) in 2010 for her work with immigration and integration issues.

== Threats ==
In 2013, following her participation in the Oslo Pride Parade, Amal Aden says she received 146 threatening messages. Aden is an outspoken Muslim-lesbian activist.

== Honours and recognitions ==
- Zola Prize, 2010
- The Amnesty Prize of Amnesty International Norway, 2012
- Erik Bye's Memorial Prize, 2014
- Gina Krog Prize of the Norwegian Association for Women's Rights, 2016

== Bibliography ==
Aden is the author of several books:

- Se oss: bekymringsmelding fra en ung norsksomalisk kvinne. Aschehoug (2008)
- ABC i integrering: 111 gode råd om hvordan alle kan bli fullverdige borgere i det norske samfunnet. Aschehoug (2009)
- Min drøm om frihet: En selvbiografisk fortelling. Aschehoug (2009)
- Det skal merkes at de gråter: Om likestilling blant somaliere i Norge (2011)
- Om håpet glipper, er alt tapt (2012)
- Jacayl er kjærlighet på somali (2015)
