= Deutscher Frauenring =

German feminist organization

Deutscher Frauenring e.V. (DFR) is a non-partisan political advocacy organisation and the leading women's organization in Germany, founded in 1949 in Bad Pyrmont to promote the interests of women in all areas of society. During the Cold War, it only existed in West Germany (including West Berlin). The association is a member of the International Alliance of Women, an NGO with general consultative status with the United Nations. It has state chapters in all 16 states, 40 local branches and around 50,000 members. It published the journal Grüne Reihe.

Deutscher Frauenring traditionally belongs to the movement often referred to as the "bourgeois-liberal" women's rights movement and thus stands in a broad and inclusive liberal feminist tradition. In modern times, Deutscher Frauenring takes an intersectional perspective into account and thus understands the human rights of minority groups as an integral part of feminism, and the organization supports, for example, the rights of transgender people and other queer people.
