= Dorothea Schjoldager =

Norwegian proponent for women's rights

- Born: 19 September 1853; Tromsø, Norway
- Died: 30 September 1938 (aged 85); Oslo
- Occupation(s): School teacher, social worker
- Organisation(s): Norwegian Association for Women's Rights; Norwegian National Women's Council
- Known for: proponent for women's rights

Dorothea Margrethe Schjoldager (19 September 1853 – 30 September 1938) was a noted Norwegian feminist and proponent for women's rights. She worked as a school teacher and social worker.

== Life and career ==
Schjoldager was born at Tromsø in Troms county, Norway. She was the daughter of Hagbart Nilsen Schjoldager (1823–1873) and Anna Margrethe Figenschou (1832–1874). In 1862, her family relocated to the town of Vardø in Finnmark county. She grew up as the eldest siblings of six. Her parents both died early, and she gained full responsibility for her younger siblings. She was a school teacher, first in Vardø and later at Steinkjer in Nord-Trøndelag county. From 1875 she worked in Kristiania (now Oslo). From 1876 she was a teacher at Møllergata skole where she taught until 1923.

She was also very engaged in social work among alcoholics, prostitutes, prisoners and children in public care. She was actively involved with the Norwegian Association for Women's Rights (Norsk Kvinnesaksforening) and the Norwegian National Women's Council (Norske Kvinners Nasjonalråd). She was a board member of Kristiania vergeråd from 1900 to 1927. In 1901, she initiated the establishing of the first homes for unmarried mothers in Kristiania. She contributed to the public debate, and argued in favour of female priests in the Church of Norway, as well as for women as police and prison workers.

She was never married and was the sister-in-law of Norwegian author Hans Aanrud.

Schjoldager died on Oslo on 30 September 1938.
