= Ingerid Gjøstein Resi =

Norwegian politician (1901–1955)

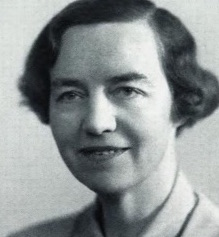
- Ingerid Gjøstein Resi

15th President of the Norwegian Association for Women's Rights
- In office 1952–1955
- Preceded by: Dakky Kiær
- Succeeded by: Marit Aarum

Personal details
- Born: 15 July 1901
- Died: 6 August 1955 (aged 54)
- Party: Liberal Party

Ingerid Gjøstein Resi (15 July 1901 – 6 August 1955) was a Norwegian philologist, women's rights leader and politician for the Liberal Party. She served as president of the Norwegian Association for Women's Rights from 1952 until her death in 1955.

== Career ==
Beginning in 1921, Gjøstein Resi worked as a stenographer at the Parliament of Norway. She passed the examen artium, a university entrance exam, in 1929. She then attended the Royal Frederick University and obtained a cand.philol. degree in 1931.

She was a member of Oppegård municipal council and its executive committee, representing the Liberal Party, from 1952. She was the chairwoman of the Oslo branch of the Norwegian Association for Women's Rights before she was elected as the organisation's president in 1952. She died in a plane crash in the Soviet Union in 1955 along with the rest of the women's delegation.

== Personal life ==
Gjøstein Resi was born on 15 July 1901 in Stavanger, Norway, the youngest of five children. She was the daughter of the politician and journalist Stavanger Johan Gjøstein and the women's rights pioneer Anna Gjøstein.

She was married to parish priest Oscar Resi and had two children. Their son, Kjell Gjøstein Resi, was born on 7 November 1937. He became a successful journalist in Norway, working as a foreign correspondent for NRK during the Vietnam War and later in the Middle East. Their daughter, Heid Gjøstein Resi, was an archeologist and professor at the University of Oslo.
