= Dakky Kiær =

Norwegian politician

Dagny Caroline Kiær
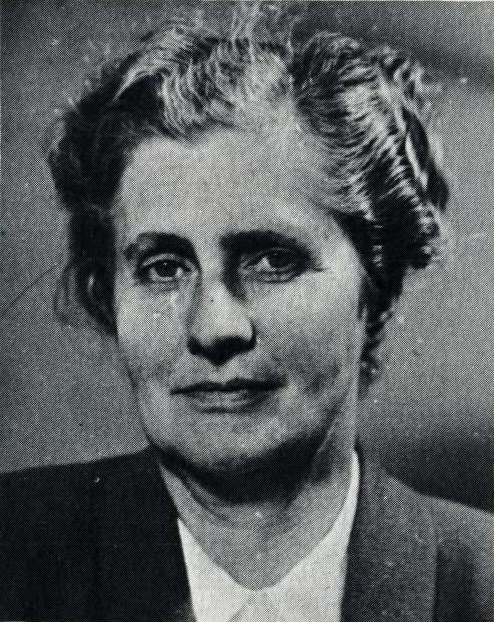
- Dakky Kiær

14th President of the Norwegian Association for Women's Rights
- In office 1946–1952
- Preceded by: Margarete Bonnevie
- Succeeded by: Ingerid Gjøstein Resi

Personal details
- Born: 19 August 1892
- Died: 21 July 1980 (aged 87)
- Party: Liberal Party

Dagny Caroline "Dakky" Kiær (19 August 1892 – 21 July 1980) was a Norwegian politician for the Liberal Party, feminist and civic leader.

She was born in Aker as a daughter of barrister and former mayor of Aker, Georg Fredrik Egidius Kiær and Julie Caroline Helene Løvenskiold. Her maternal grandfather Herman Severin Løvenskiold (1838–1910) was Lord Chamberlain of the Royal Court. She was sister of industrialist Thorry Kiær.

She was rector of Norske Kvinners Nasjonalråds sosialskole 1946–1953 and president of the Norwegian Association for Women's Rights 1946–52. She served as a member of the city council of Oslo for the Liberal Party 1952–1956. She was the runner-up for the party's ballot in the 1949 parliamentary election, and later a minor ballot candidate in 1953 and 1957.

She died in July 1980 in Oslo.
