= Petroleum Price Board =

Norwegian government agency

The Petroleum Price Board (Petroleumsprisrådet) is a Norwegian government agency responsible for setting norm prices for petroleum produced on the Norwegian continental shelf. The Board has six permanent members, including four government-appointed independent experts and one representative each from the Ministry of Finance and the Ministry of Petroleum and Energy. The Board meets quarterly.
