= Eva Kolstad =

Norwegian politician (1918–1999)

18th President of the Norwegian Association for Women's Rights
- In office 1956–1968
- Preceded by: Signe Swensson
- Succeeded by: Clara Ottesen

Member of the United Nations Commission on the Status of Women
- In office 1969–1975

Minister of Government Administration and Consumer Affairs
- In office 18 October 1972 – 16 October 1973
- Prime Minister: Lars Korvald
- Preceded by: Inger Louise Valle
- Succeeded by: Odd Sagør

Leader of the Liberal Party
- In office 9 March 1974 – 27 March 1976
- Preceded by: Helge Rognlien
- Succeeded by: Hans H. Rossbach

Gender Equality Ombud of Norway
- In office 1978–1988
- Succeeded by: Ingse Stabel

Personal details
- Born: Eva Severine Lundegaard Hartvig; 6 May 1918 Halden, Østfold, Norway
- Died: 26 March 1999 (aged 80) Oslo, Norway
- Party: Liberal
- Spouse: Ragnar Kolstad

Eva Severine Lundegaard Kolstad (born Eva Severine Lundegaard Hartvig; 6 May 1918 – 26 March 1999) was a Norwegian politician and government minister for the Liberal Party. A major figure in the history of liberal feminism and the development of state feminism in the Nordic countries, she pioneered gender equality policies in Norway and at the United Nations. She served as president of the Norwegian Association for Women's Rights (1956–1968), member and vice chairman of the United Nations Commission on the Status of Women (1969–1975), Minister of Government Administration and Consumer Affairs of Norway in Korvald's Cabinet (1972–1973), leader of the Liberal Party (1974–1976) and as Norwegian Gender Equality Ombudsman (1978–1988), the first gender equality ombudsman worldwide.

== Early life ==
Eva Kolstad was born in 1918 in Halden, Norway. She worked as a bookkeeping teacher before becoming active in the cause of women's rights.

== Career ==
Kolstad was the leader of the Liberal Party from 1974 to 1976, making her the first female party leader in Norway. She was also the first ombudsman for gender equality (likestillingsombud) in Norway, and in extent the world. Outside politics she worked as an accountant.

She was a minor ballot candidate in the 1953 election, and was not elected. She served as a deputy representative to the Parliament of Norway from Oslo during the terms 1957–1961 and 1965–1969. In between she was runner-up behind Helge Seip on the Liberal ballot in the 1961 election, but the Liberals had no MPs elected. She was the Minister of Administration and Consumer Affairs in 1972–1973 during the cabinet Korvald. On the local level she was member of the executive committee of Oslo city council from 1960 to 1975.

Kolstad was a Commander of the Order of St. Olav and received the Medal of St. Hallvard in 1986.

== Personal life ==
She was married to the lawyer and Assistant Director General in the Ministry of Justice, Ragnar Kolstad. Her father-in-law was Prime Minister Peder Kolstad.

Political offices
Preceded by Inger Louise Valle	Norwegian Minister of Administration and Consumer Affairs; 1972–1973	Succeeded by Odd Georg Sagør
Party political offices
Preceded by Helge Rognlien	Leader of the Liberal Party of Norway; 1974–1976	Succeeded by Hans Hammond Rossbach
Civic offices
Preceded by position created	Norwegian Gender Equality Ombud; 1978–1988	Succeeded by Ingse Stabel
