= Kari Skjønsberg =

Norwegian academic, writer and feminist

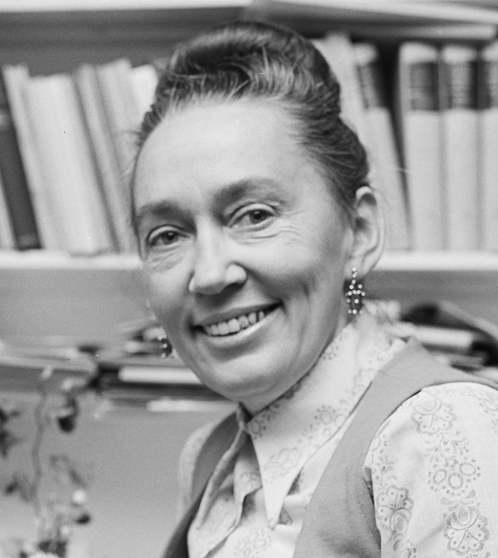

20th President of the Norwegian Association for Women's Rights
- In office 1972–1978
- Preceded by: Clara Ottesen
- Succeeded by: Karin M. Bruzelius

Personal details
- Born: 17 January 1926
- Died: 6 January 2003 (aged 76)
- Occupation: academic and writer

Kari Skjønsberg (17 January 1926 – 6 January 2003) was a Norwegian academic, writer and feminist.

== Biography ==
She was born in Oslo, Norway. She worked on the Saturday Children's Hour (Lørdagsbarnetimen) on NRK radio during the 1940s. In the 1950s, she was a literary critic for Arbeiderbladet and Verdens Gang. She graduated in 1953 with a dissertation on the development of Norwegian children's stories. She was associate professor of children's literature at the State Library College (Statens bibliotekhøgskole) (now Oslo and Akershus University College) from 1968 to 1994 and served as president of the Norwegian Association for Women's Rights from 1972 to 1978. She also wrote a number of books on children's literature.

Kari Skjønsberg prize (Kari Skjønsberg-prisen) was established in 1996 and was first awarded in 1997. It was established to promote research on children's and youth literature. It is awarded annually by the Department of Journalism, Library and Information Studies by Oslo and Akershus University College. Kari Skjønsberg died in 2003 and was buried at Vestre gravlund in Oslo.

== Bibliography ==
- Historie og samfunn : åtte artikler 1956-1991. Oslo, 1995. ISBN 82-579-0049-4
- Kjønnsroller og leserroller : åtte artikler 1962-1992 . Oslo, 1995. ISBN 82-579-0048-6
- 7 papers on children's literature 1985-1994 : in English, Deutsch, Français . Oslo, 1995. ISBN 82-579-0050-8
- Ti artikler om barne- og ungdomslitteratur 1973-1993. Oslo, 1993.
- «Norsk barnelitteratur på 1800-tallet» I: (Finlands barnboksinstitut. Skrifter; 3). ISBN 951-99468-8-8
- Hvor var kvinnene? : elleve kvinner om årene 1945-1960. Gyldendal, 1979
- Hvem forteller? : om adaptasjoner i barnelitteratur. Tiden, 1979. ISBN 82-10-01836-1
- Fernanda Nissen. Tiden, 1978 ISBN 82-10-01595-8
- Kjønnsrollemønster i skandinaviske barne- og ungdomsbøker. København : Gyldendal, 1977. ISBN 87-01-51371-0
- Camilla Collett. Tiden, 1976 ISBN 82-10-01175-8
- Gavnlige og morende Fortællinger for Børn : Et utvalg av eldre norsk barnelitteratur. Samlet og presentert av Kari Skjønsberg. Aschehoug, 1974. ISBN 82-03-05296-7
- Mannssamfunnet midt imot. Norsk kvinnesaksdebatt gjennom tre «mannsaldre». En antologi ved Kari Skjønsberg. Gyldendal, 1974 ISBN 82-05-06262-5
- Kjønnsroller, miljø og sosial lagdeling i barnelitteraturen. Universitetsforlaget, 1972 ISBN 82-00-08839-1
