= Marit Aarum =

Economist, liberal politician, civil servant and feminist

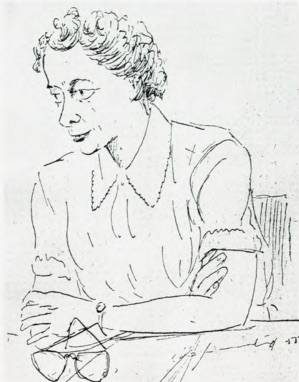

16th President of the Norwegian Association for Women's Rights
- In office 1955–1956
- Preceded by: Ingerid Gjøstein Resi
- Succeeded by: Signe Swensson

Deputy member of the Norwegian Parliament
- In office 1954–1956

President of the Liberal Party in Oslo

Personal details
- Born: 22 April 1903
- Died: 19 February 1956 (aged 52)
- Party: Liberal Party
- Occupation: economist and politician

Marit Johanne Aarum (22 April 1903 – 19 February 1956) was a Norwegian economist, liberal politician, civil servant and feminist.

Aarum studied at Royal Frederick University and received a cand.oecon. degree in 1926.

== Career ==
Aarum was an inspector at the Norwegian Labour Inspection Authority and served as a representative of the Norwegian government to the international Labour conference in 1948. She worked as an International Labour Organization expert in Pakistan for six months from 1952 to 1953.

Aarum became the vice president of the Norwegian Association for Women's Rights in 1952. When the organisation's president, Ingerid Gjøstein Resi, died in a plane crash in August 1955, Aarum took over as President. She remained president until her death in 1956.

During her political career, she was President of the Oslo branch of the Liberal Party and a member of the City Council of Oslo. She was a deputy member of the Norwegian Parliament representing Oslo for the Liberal Party from 1954 until her death.

== Publications ==
- Midlertidig lov om Arbeidsvilkår for hushjelp av 3. desember 1949 : med kommentarer samt en del om Ferieloven og Syketrygdloven, 1949
