= National Association for Women's Suffrage (Norway) =

Norwegian political organization (1898–1913)

The National Association for Women's Suffrage (Norwegian: Landskvinnestemmerettsforeningen, LSKF) was a Norwegian association for women suffrage, active from 1898 until 1913. It was founded by members of the Norwegian Association for Women's Rights (NKF), and the two organizations were closely related, at times sharing the same president.

== History ==
It was founded as by members of NKF as a national suffrage organization, in contrast to the previous suffrage organisation, Kvindestemmeretsforeningen (1885–1913), which was only a local organisation for the capital of Oslo. LSKF had a somewhat more progressive program than Kvindestemmeretsforeningen. Among its founders and most active members were Gina Krog, Fredrikke Marie Qvam, Betzy Kjelsberg and Fredrikke Mørck. Both the founders of Kvindestemmeretsforeningen and Landskvinnestemmerettsforeningen were and remained members of the Norwegian Association for Women's Rights (NKF), and the establishment of the suffrage organisations did not represent a split. On the contrary, LSKF and NKF had the same president, Fredrikke Marie Qvam, for several years, and the two organisations were closely aligned. NKF views LSKF as its former subsidiary, and inherited LSKF's founding membership of the International Alliance of Women (IAW) in 1937. Consequently NKF also views itself as the custodian and heir to the legacy of LSKF.

The LSKF was founded as a protest to the suffrage reform of 1898, when male suffrage was achieved, while women were left out. The year after, the members put forward a demand of women suffrage with 12 000 names for the parliament. In 1905, the organisation supported the dissolve of the union with Sweden. From 1906, it was a part of the International Council of Women. The purpose of the organisation was met with the introduction of women suffrage in 1913.

== See also ==
- Women's suffrage organizations
- List of suffragists and suffragettes
- Timeline of women's suffrage
