= Karin Maria Bruzelius =

Norwegian civil servant and judge (born 1941)

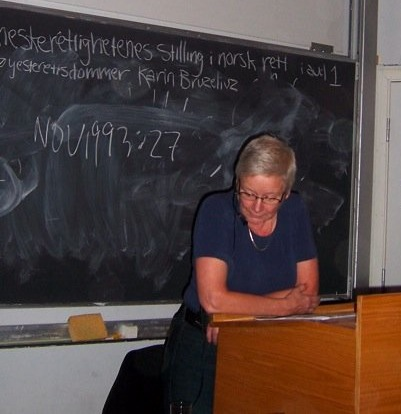
- Bruzelius lecturing on human rights in 2009

21st and 32nd President of the Norwegian Association for Women's Rights
- In office 1978–1984
- Preceded by: Kari Skjønsberg
- Succeeded by: Sigrun Hoel
- In office 2018–2020
- Preceded by: Marit Nybakk
- Succeeded by: Anne Hege Grung

Chairman of the Petroleum Price Board
- In office 1987–2004

Secretary-General of the Ministry of Transport and Communications
- In office 1989–1997
- Succeeded by: Per Sanderud

Supreme Court Justice
- In office 1997–2011

Personal details
- Born: 19 February 1941 (age 85)
- Parent: Anders Bruzelius (father)

Karin Maria Bruzelius (born 19 February 1941) is a Swedish-born Norwegian supreme court justice and former president of the Norwegian Association for Women's Rights. In 1989, she became the first woman to be appointed Permanent Secretary of a government ministry, heading the Ministry of Transport and Communications until 1997. She was appointed supreme court justice on the Supreme Court of Norway in 1997, retiring in 2011.

She has previously also been a director-general in the Ministry of Justice and a corporate lawyer. She was a member of the Permanent Court of Arbitration at The Hague from 2004 to 2010, and chaired the Petroleum Price Board from 1987 to 2004. She served as president of the Norwegian Association for Women's Rights from 1978 to 1984, and from 2018 to 2020. She has been affiliated with the Scandinavian Institute of Maritime Law at the University of Oslo Faculty of Law since 2011.

== Background ==
She was born in Lund, Sweden, as the daughter of the judge and legal scholar Anders Bruzelius. She graduated as jur.kand. (JD) from Lund University in 1964, and Master of Law from Columbia Law School in 1969. When she was a law student at Lund University, Ruth Bader Ginsburg stayed at the university to co-author the book Civil Procedure in Sweden with her father, and Ginsburg became a close friend of the family. Karin Bruzelius later said that "by getting close to my family, Ruth realized that one could live in a completely different way, that women could have a different lifestyle and legal position than what they had in the United States"; Bruzelius' father and Ginsburg jointly received honorary doctorates at Lund in 1969.

== Legal career ==
Following her graduation in 1964, she briefly worked as an assistant judge in Gothenburg. Later that year, she moved to Norway as a result of her marriage to Norwegian lawyer and peace activist Fredrik Heffermehl. Bruzelius became a Norwegian citizen in 1972, and was naturalized through an act of parliament in 1974, a rare procedure that was necessary for appointment of a foreign-born person to higher office in the civil service.

She worked in the Norwegian Ministry of Justice and the Police from 1965 to 1982, and became a principal officer in the ministry's legal affairs department in 1974, an assistant director-general in the department in 1978, and a director-general and head of the ministry's polar department in 1979. Her work in the Ministry of Justice focused on transport legislation and private international law as well as international law issues related to Svalbard and the Norwegian continental shelf where Norway was developing its petroleum industry at the time. She was only the second woman to become a director-general in a government ministry, and the first in the Ministry of Justice.

From 1982 to 1987, she worked as a corporate lawyer for the Nordic Association of Marine Insurers, before returning to central government as a director-general in the Ministry of Transport and Communications. She was promoted to secretary-general (permanent under-secretary of State), the chief civil servant of the ministry, in 1989 as the first woman to hold such a position in Norway. In 1997, she was appointed by the King-in-Council as Cupreme Court Justice on the Supreme Court of Norway, and served until 2011. She was also a member of the Permanent Court of Arbitration at The Hague from 2004 to 2010. Since 2011, she has been affiliated with the Scandinavian Institute of Maritime Law.

She has chaired the Petroleum Price Board (1987–2004), responsible for setting norm prices for petroleum produced on the Norwegian continental shelf. She chairs the Norwegian Financial Services Complaints Board. She was president of the Norwegian Association for Women's Rights 1978–1984, and 2018–2020; she was also Vice President of the association 1974–1978, and 2014–2016, and a board member for 18 years between 1974, and 2020. She was a board member of the International Alliance of Women 1979–1985. Since 2016, she has been a member of the Norwegian Women's Lobby's expert committee.

On 5 February 2008, the Standing Committee on Scrutiny and Constitutional Affairs of the Norwegian Parliament recommended that a commission be named to investigate and, if warranted, prosecute for impeachment three of the Norwegian Supreme Court Justices who presided over the cases of Fritz Moen, a victim of miscarriage of justice. The three were Bruzelius, Magnus Matningsdal and Eilert Stang Lund. However, when the case was treated by the Standing Committee on Justice three months later, it was closed.

Civic offices
Preceded by Erik Ribu	Permanent under-secretary of state in the Ministry of Transport and Communications; 1989–1997	Succeeded by Per Sanderud
