= Krog (surname) =

Krog may refer to:

- Antjie Krog (born 1952), South African writer
- Cecilie Thoresen Krog (1858–1911), Norwegian women's rights activist
- Eli Krog (1891–1970), Norwegian translator
- Frank Krog (1954–2008), Norwegian actor
- Georg Krog (speed skater) (1915–1991), Norwegian speed skater
- Gina Krog (1847–1916), Norwegian women's rights activist
- Helge Krog (1889–1962), Norwegian writer
- Hildur Krog (1922–2014), Norwegian botanist
- Jason Krog (born 1975), Professional ice hockey player
- Jørn Aksel Krog (born 1948), Norwegian civil servant
- Karin Krog (born 1937), Norwegian jazz singer
- Nicolai Johan Lohmann Krog (1787–1856), Norwegian politician
- Peder Krog (1654–1731), Danish-Norwegian bishop

== See also ==
- Krogh
- Krohg
