= Blehr =

Blehr is a Norwegian surname. Notable people with the surname include:

- Eivind Blehr (1881–1957), Norwegian minister in the NS government of Vidkun Quisling
- Otto Blehr (1847–1927), Norwegian attorney and politician
- Randi Blehr (1851–1928), Norwegian feminist
- Thomas Johan Blehr (1924–2022), Norwegian businessman

== See also ==
- Blair, surname
