= Aadel Lampe =

Norwegian women's rights leader

9th President of the Norwegian Association for Women's Rights
- In office 1922–1926
- Preceded by: Randi Blehr
- Succeeded by: Fredrikke Mørck

Deputy member of the Storting for Christiania
- In office 1922–1924

Personal details
- Born: 10 May 1857 Stranda Municipality, Norway
- Died: 8 September 1944 (aged 87)
- Party: Liberal Party; Free-minded Liberal Party

Aadel Lampe (10 May 1857 – 8 September 1944) was a Norwegian women's rights leader, liberal politician, teacher for deaf children and suffragist in the late 19th and early 20th century. She was elected as a deputy member of the Storting in 1922, as one of the first women elected to the Norwegian parliament, and served as president of the Norwegian Association for Women's Rights from 1922 to 1926.

== Biography ==
Aadel Lampe was born in Stranda Municipality in Romsdalen county, Norway. Her father, Claus Ernst Lampe, was a parish priest. She graduated as a teacher from the Nissen Higher School for Young Women in Kristiania (now Oslo) and was then employed as a teacher at Nissen's Girls' School. Later she worked as a teacher at Hedevig Rosing's skole, a school for deaf children in Kristiania.

She was one of the early leaders of the Norwegian Association for Women's Rights, and served as its president from 1922 to 1926. She joined the board of the organization in 1895 and served as vice president during the terms 1899–1903 and 1912–1922, when Fredrikke Marie Qvam and Randi Blehr were Presidents.

Lampe was originally a member of the Liberal Party, but later joined the conservative-liberal Free-minded Liberal Party, where she was a deputy member of the national executive and a board member of the party's women's association. Together with Randi Blehr and Cecilie Thoresen Krog, she was a co-signatory of a letter to the national government which called for women being admitted to the civil service. In the 1921 parliamentary election she was elected as a deputy member of the Storting for the term 1922–1924, representing the constituency of Christiania and an electoral list of the Free-minded Liberal Party and the Conservative Party. She was one of five women elected to the parliament, four of whom were deputy members and the fifth was Norway's first permanent MP, Karen Platou, who represented the same party list and the same constituency as Lampe.
