= Kitty Bugge =

Norwegian feminist and union leader

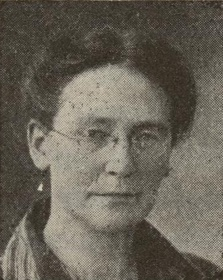
- Kitty Bugge, union leader and feminist

12th President of the Norwegian Association for Women's Rights
- In office 1935–1936
- Preceded by: Anna Hvoslef
- Succeeded by: Margarete Bonnevie

Personal details
- Born: 1878
- Died: 1938 (aged 59–60)

Kitty Bugge (1878–1938) was a Norwegian feminist and union leader. She served as the 12th President of the Norwegian Association for Women's Rights from 1935 to 1936. Bugge also founded the National Union of Female Telegraph Operators and served as its first President from 1914 to 1919 and again from 1921 to 1933. She was a board member of the Union of State Employees from 1923 to 1930. Bugge was a sister of the noted feminist, lawyer and diplomat Anna Bugge.
