= NKS =

NKS may refer to:

- US Spirit Airlines, ICAO code
- Norwegian Women's Public Health Association (Norske Kvinners Sanitetsforening)
- NKS Nysa, later Stal Nysa, a Polish volleyball team
- A New Kind of Science, a 2002 book by Stephen Wolfram
- Native Kontrol Standard software, for Native Instruments music hardware
- Norton Knatchbull School, secondary grammar school located in Ashford, Kent
