= Anne Bolette Holsen =

Norwegian proponent for women's rights

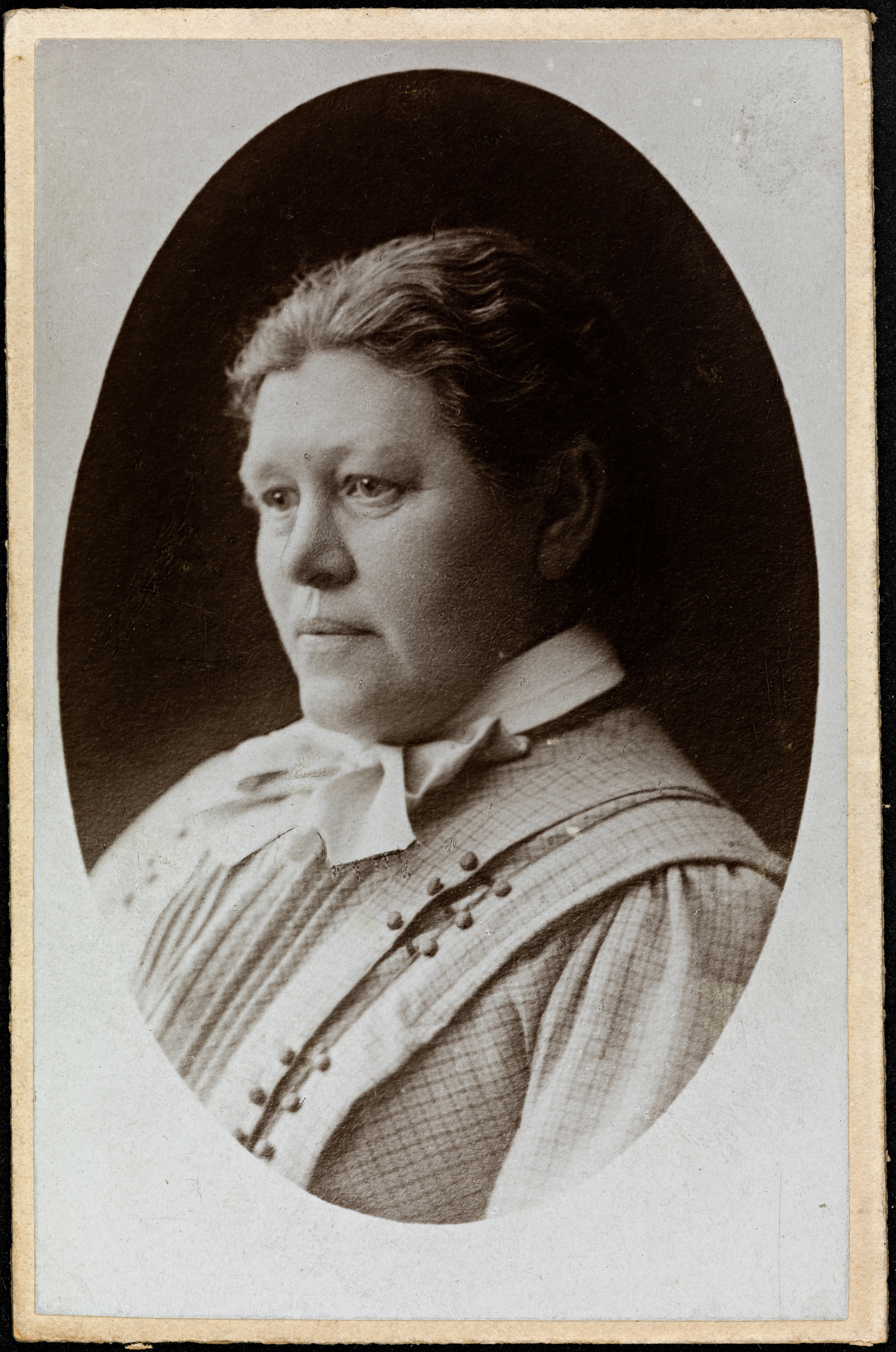
- Born: 21 July 1856; Bergen, Norway
- Died: 1 June 1913 (aged 56); Kristiania, Norway
- Occupation: Schoolteacher
- Known for: Proponent of women's rights

Anne Bolette Holsen (21 July 1856 – 1 June 1913) was a Norwegian schoolteacher and proponent for women's rights. She was a co-founder of Kvindestemmeretsforeningen in 1885, and chaired the organization from 1897 until her death.

== Personal life ==
Holsen was born in Bergen to Ole Rasmussen Holsen and Synnøve Høisæth. She died in Kristiania in 1913.

== Career ==
Holsen was educated as schoolteacher, and from 1879 she was appointed at a primary school in Sofienberg in Kristiania. She took part in organizational work, and was active in the association Kristiania Lærerinneforening. In 1900 she established a secondary school for girls (Norwegian: fortsettelsesskole for unge piger) at Grünerløkka in Kristiania, along with Anna Rogstad and Göthilde Næss. The school was the first of its kind, and was taken over by Kristiania municipality in 1909, and served as a model for similar schools (Norwegian: fortsettelsesskole/framhaldsskole) in other cities in Norway.

She was a co-founder of Kvindestemmeretsforeningen in 1885, among with Gina Krog, Ragna Nielsen, Anna Rogstad and others, and chaired the organization from 1897 until her death.
