= Norwegian National Women's Council =

Norwegian umbrella organization for women

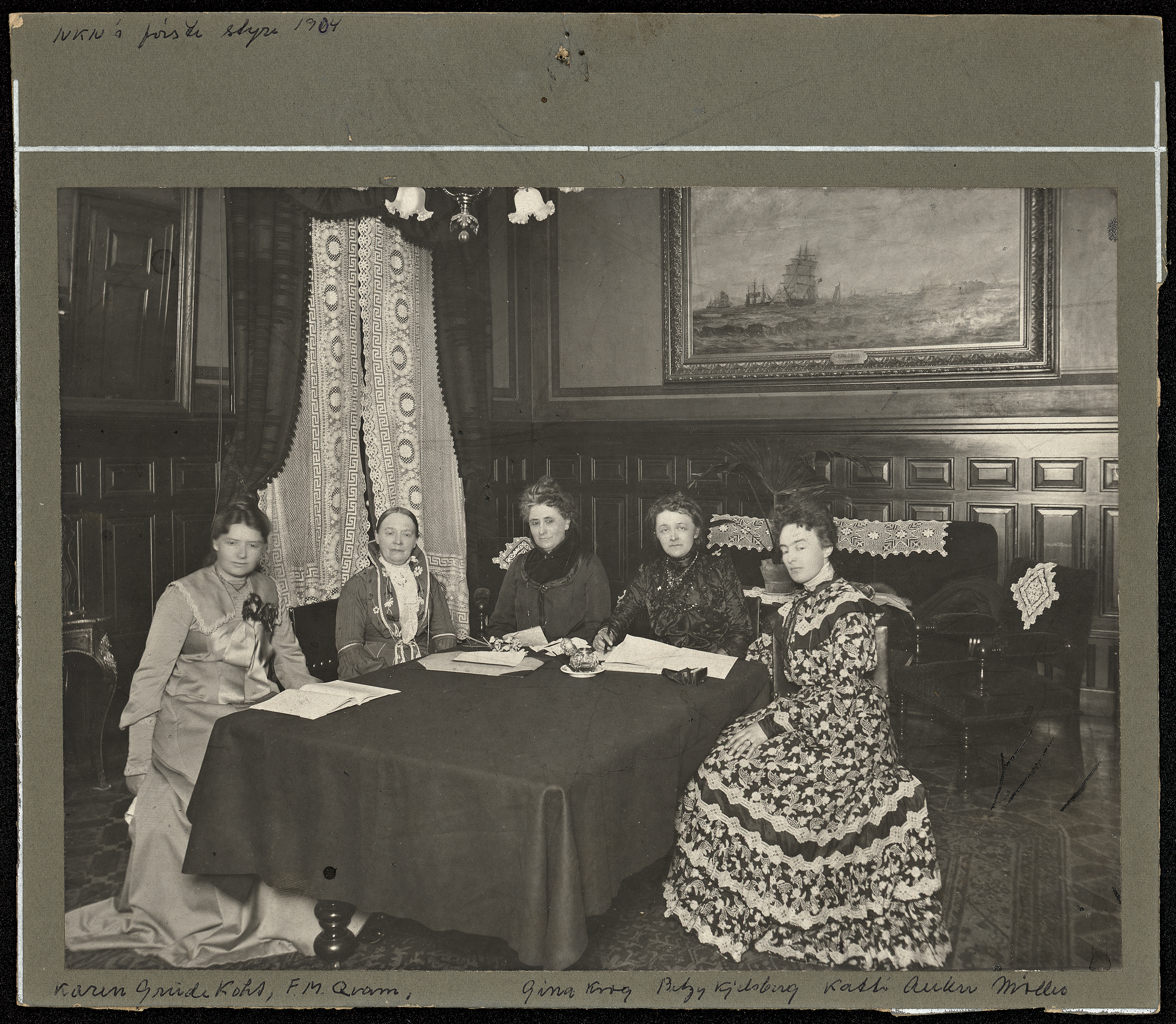
First meeting of the National Women's Council (1904). Left to right: Karen Grude Koht, Fredrikke Marie Qvam, Gina Krog, Betzy Kjelsberg and Katti Anker Møller

The Norwegian National Women's Council (Norwegian: Norske Kvinners Nasjonalråd) was founded on 8 January 1904 as an umbrella organization for the various Norwegian women's associations. It was established by Gina Krog whose international contacts had revealed that the International Council of Women was keen to include a delegation from Norway. As a result of diminishing interest, the organization discontinued its work at the end of 1989.

== Background ==
Gina Krog had been preparing an agenda for the Women's Council in the "Help Committee" (Hjelpekomité) she had run until it was dissolved in 1902. The council brought together the interests of Norway's women's associations with the expectation of the Labour Party's Women's Federation (Arbeiderpartiets kvindeforbund). One of the areas of concern was the white slave trade (now known as trafficking), which had first been raised at the Nordic Women's Day meeting in Christiania in 1902. The Central Board of Norwegian Ethics Associations (Centralstyret for De norske Sædelighetsforeninger) had also encouraged the establishment of a National Women's Council in order to bring the topic to the attention of the international community. Other areas addressed included voting rights, equal treatment in economic matters, and rights to education and jobs. Later areas of concern were maternity insurance and parliamentary representation in the Storting.

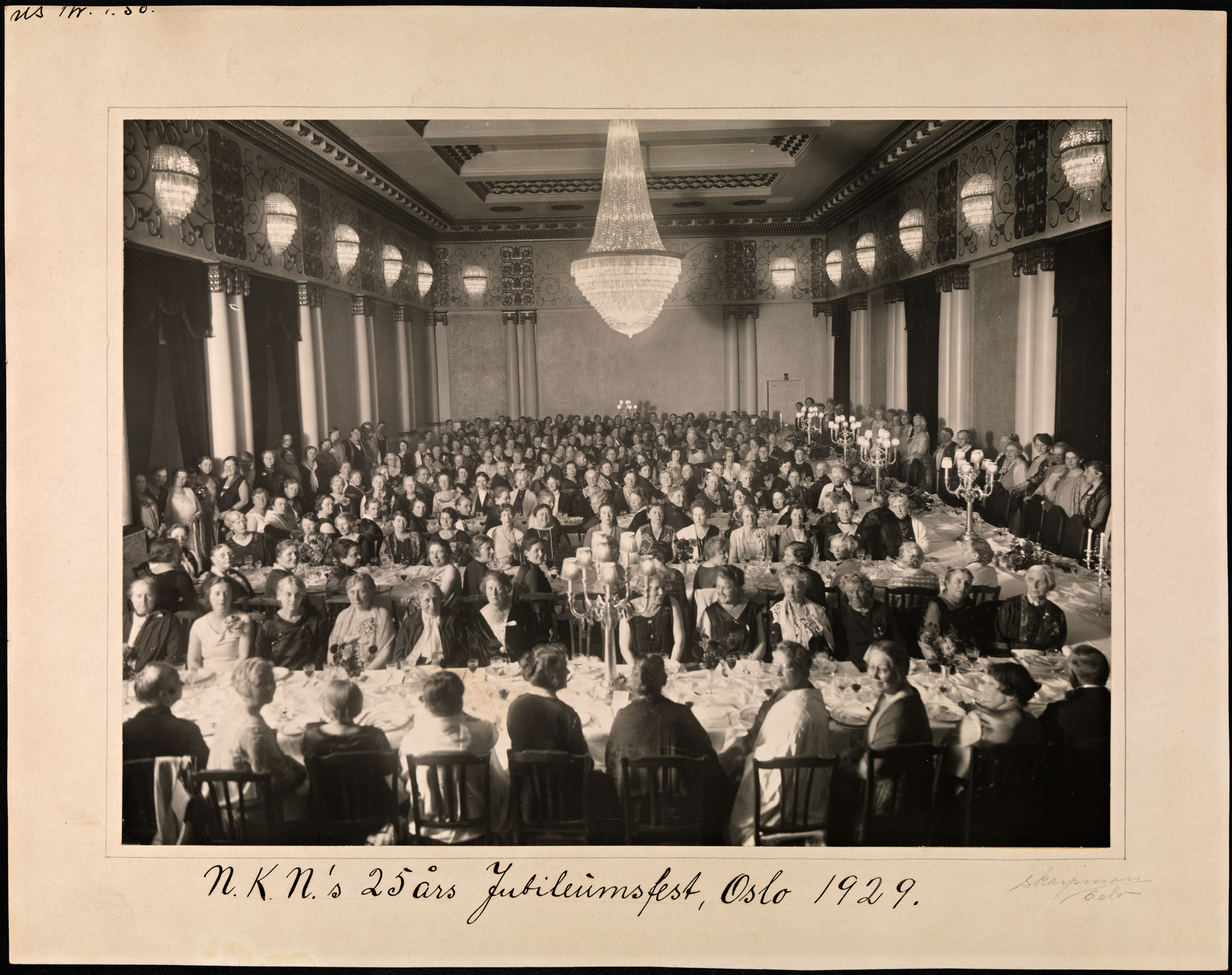
The Women's Council's 25th anniversary celebrations (1929)

== Development ==
As social aspects became increasingly important, in 1920 the Women's Council established the Norske Kvinners Nasjonalråd Sosialskole. Along with its affiliated institutions, the school offered the only possibility for receiving an education in social work. The Council became increasingly important for discussions on women's rights, their annual meeting often being referred to as Kvinnenes Storting or women's parliament.

In the 1970s, the Women's Council begin to take on a more combative role, raising concerns in new areas of interest such as taxation, women in the armed forces and rights to financial support. In 1971, the council was given observer status on Norway's United Nations' delegation. Success was also achieved in having more women elected to municipal government. In view of the council's general opposition to abortion, the feminist Norwegian Association for Women's Rights (Norsk Kvinnesaksforening), which had been a member from the beginning, withdrew its support in 1972. In 1987, the housewives' organization Norges Husmorforbund also left on the grounds that the Women's Council was becoming too radical, promoting jobs for women rather than improvements to the woman's place in the home.

== Termination ==
Women's organizations experienced increasing difficulties during the 1980s. As a result of general improvements in conditions for women, interest diminished. The government also began to establish bodies tasked with the protection of women's rights. When the Norwegian Women's Public Health Association (Norske Kvinners Sanitetsforening), the largest member organization, withdrew its support in 1988, it became obvious the Women's Council could no longer maintain its interests. In 1989, it was decided that the organization should close with effect from 1 January 1990.

== Presidents of the Women's Council ==
The following women headed the organization from 1904 to 1989:

- Gina Krog (1904–1916)
- Nico Hambro (1916–1922)
- Betzy Kjelsberg (1916–1938?)
- Sigrid Stray (1938–1946)
- Claudia Olsen (1946–1953)
- Julla Sæthern (1953–1959)
- Astri Rynning (1959–1968)
- Birgit B. Wiig (1968–1973)
- Anna Louise Beer (1973–1979)
- Grethe Værnø (1979–1981)
- Kjellaug Skogen (1981–1985)
- Ingjerd Johnson (1985–1989)

== See also ==
- Feminism in Norway
- Women's organisations based in Norway
