= Fifth Conference of the International Woman Suffrage Alliance =

1909 conference in London, England

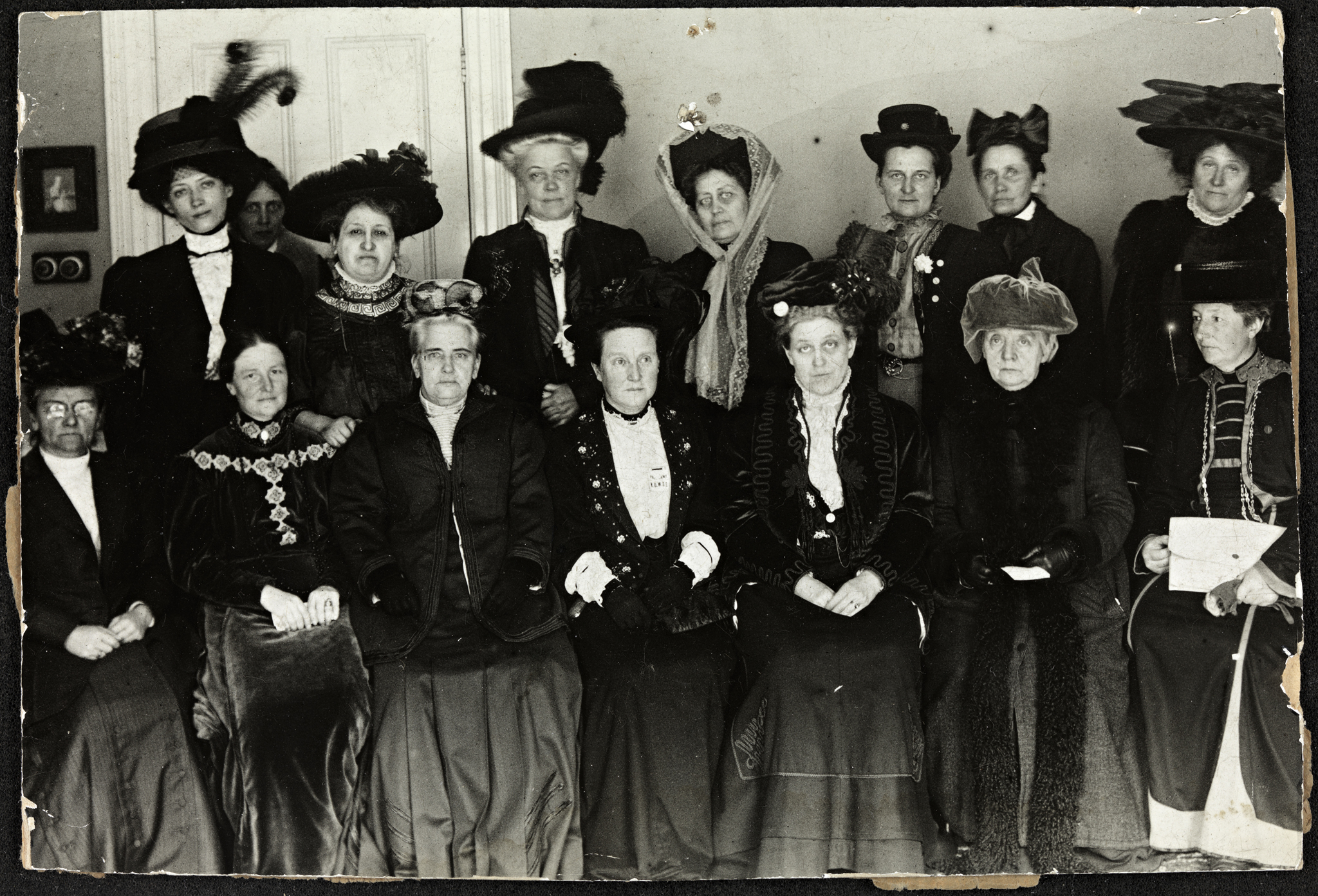
Suffrage Alliance Congress with Millicent Fawcett presiding, London 1909. Top row from left: Thora Daugaard (Denmark), Louise Qvam (Norway), Aletta Jacobs (Netherlands), Annie Furuhjelm (Finland), Zinaida Mirovitch (Russia), Käthe Schirmacher (Germany), Klara Honegger (Switzerland), unidentified. Bottom left: Unidentified, Anna Bugge (Sweden), Anna Howard Shaw (USA), Millicent Fawcett (Presiding, England), Carrie Chapman Catt (USA), Fredrikke Marie Qvam (Norway), Anita Augspurg (Germany).

The Fifth Conference of the International Woman Suffrage Alliance was held in London, England from April 26 to May 1, 1909. Twenty countries were represented. Representatives from twenty countries attended, with Carrie Chapman Catt presiding.

Delegates included Johanne Münter (Denmark), Rosika Schwimmer (Hungary), Dr. Anita Augspurg (Germany), Zinaida Mirovitch (Russia), and Gina Krog (Norway).

The conference is sometimes referred to as the First Quinquennial International Woman Suffrage Alliance Meeting or the Fourth Conference of the International Woman Suffrage Alliance.

== Bibliography ==
- Delap, Lucy (2006). "Citing: "Congress of the International Woman Suffrage Alliance" (April 15, 1909), The Common Cause". Feminism and the Periodical Press, 1900-1918. Taylor & Francis. ISBN 978-0-415-32026-9.
