= Krogh =

Krogh may refer to:

== Surname ==
- Anders Krogh, professor in bioinformatics
- August Krogh (1874–1949), Danish professor in zoophysiology
- Desmond Krogh (1931-2019), South African banker and economist
- Egil Krogh (nickname "Bud"; 1939–2020), American lawyer
- Grethe Krogh (1928–2018), Danish organist and professor
- Hanne Krogh (born 1956), popular Norwegian singer
- Jan Krogh Jensen (1958–1996), Danish gangster
- Lars Krogh Jeppesen (born 1979), Danish handball player
- Mogens Krogh (born 1963), Danish footballer
- Søren Krogh (born 1977), Danish footballer
- Sverre Krogh (politician) (1921–2006), Norwegian politician
- Sverre Krogh (editor) (1883–1957), Norwegian editor and later Nazi
- Sverre Krogh Sundbø (born 1981), Norwegian poker player
- Thomas Edvard Krogh (1936–2008), geochronologist
- Gerhard Christoph von Krogh (1785–1860), Danish military officer

== Places ==
United States

- Kroghville, Wisconsin

== Other ==
- Krogh (crater), a small lunar impact crater

== See also ==
- Krog (surname)
- Krohg
- Crough
- Crow (disambiguation)
