= Fredrikke Mørck =

Norwegian feminist and editor

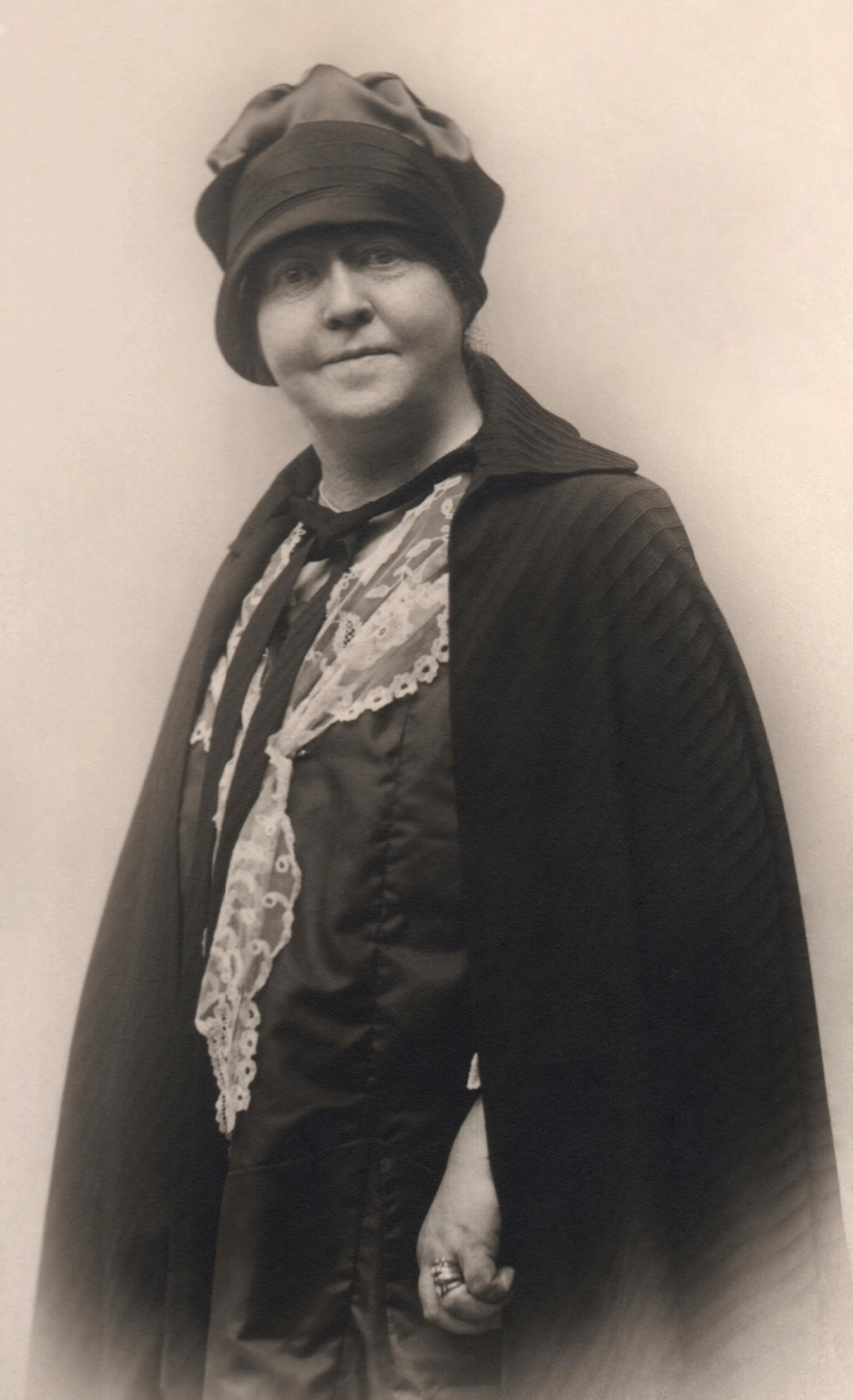

10th President of the Norwegian Association for Women's Rights
- In office 1926–1930
- Preceded by: Aadel Lampe
- Succeeded by: Anna Hvoslef

Personal details
- Born: 9 November 1861 Trondheim, Norway
- Died: 14 October 1934 (aged 72)
- Occupation: editor and teacher

Fredrikke Andrea Møllerup Mørck (9 November 1861 – 14 October 1934) was a Norwegian liberal feminist, editor, and teacher. She served as the editor-in-chief of the women's rights magazine Nylænde from 1916 to 1927 and as the 10th president of the Norwegian Association for Women's Rights from 1926 to 1930.

== Biography ==
Mørck was born in Trondheim, Norway to Christian Fredrik Møllerup Mørck (1828–97) and Helene Margrethe Crøger (1829–c. 1900). She took a teacher exam in 1880 and worked as a schoolteacher, first in Tønsberg and later in Christiania. From 1900 to 1905, she taught Middle School at Rolls Pigeskole, after which she operated her independent school, Fredrikke Mørcks Pigeskole.

Mørck was a close associate of liberal feminist Gina Krog, and both shared a strong belief in gender equality. She edited the two-volume Norske Kvinder, published in 1914. She contributed to the women's rights magazine Nylænde from its start in 1887. She succeeded Krog as the magazine's second and final editor-in-chief in 1916, editing the magazine until 1927. She was president of Norway's oldest and most prominent women's and girls' rights organization, the Norwegian Association for Women's Rights, from 1926 to 1930.

== Related reading ==
- Lønnå, Elisabeth (1996) Stolthet og kvinnekamp : Norsk kvinnesaksforenings historie fra 1913 (Oslo: Gyldendal) ISBN 8205244952
