= Randi Blehr =

Norwegian politician and feminist (1851–1928)

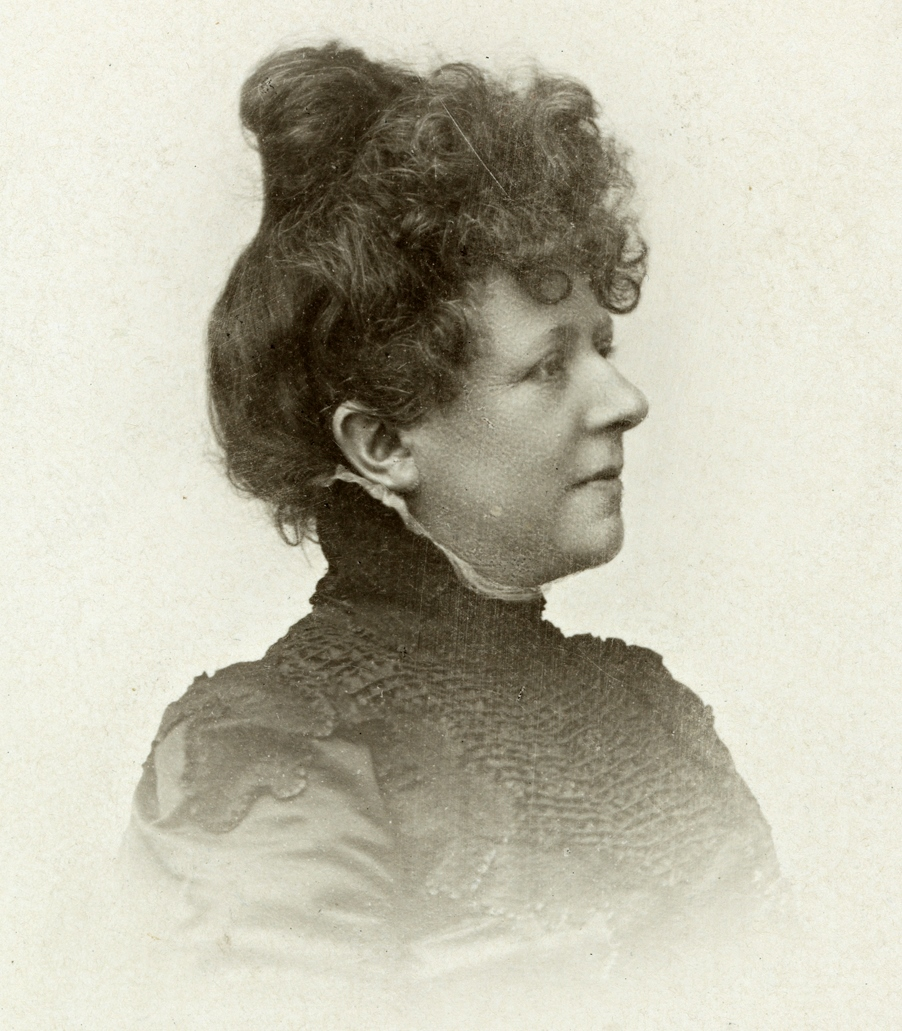

President of the Norwegian Association for Women's Rights
- In office 1895–1899
- Preceded by: Ragna Nielsen
- Succeeded by: Fredrikke Marie Qvam
- In office 1903–1922
- Preceded by: Fredrikke Marie Qvam
- Succeeded by: Aadel Lampe

Personal details
- Born: 12 February 1851
- Died: 13 June 1928 (aged 77)
- Party: Liberal Party
- Spouse: Otto Blehr

Randi Marie Blehr (née Nilsen; 12 February 1851 – 13 June 1928) was a Norwegian feminist, liberal politician, suffragist, peace activist and women's rights activist. She was married to Prime Minister of Norway Otto Blehr, and was therefore addressed as "Madam Prime Minister" (Norwegian: Statsministerinde) during her lifetime. She was one of the preeminent leaders of the Norwegian women's rights movement from the 1880s and co-founded the Norwegian Association for Women's Rights, serving as its president from 1895 to 1899 and from 1903 to 1922. She also initiated the establishment of the Norwegian Women's Public Health Association that grew to become a humanitarian organisation with 250,000 members. She was a leading advocate of Norwegian independence from Sweden and took on representative duties for Norway during her husband's tenure as prime minister.

== Background ==
Blehr was born Randi Nilsen in 1851 in Bergen to ship broker, Andreas Rasmussen Nilsen 1822–98) and Margrethe Andrea Tornøe (1827–1909); she was the oldest of eleven children. She received no formal education but pursued the arts from a young age, including drawing, theatre and music. When she was 17 years old, she joined Vestmannalaget, Norway's oldest language association. She was involved in the establishment of Den Nationale Scene, Bergen's oldest and largest theatre, in 1876, and in the same year she married Otto Blehr, a lawyer and a politician for the left-wing Liberal Party who would later become the Prime Minister of Norway; their son was Eivind Blehr.

== Career ==
Blehr became involved in the Norwegian feminist movement in the 1880s. She joined Skuld, a discussion group for female students, in 1883, and was one of the co-founders of the Norwegian Association for Women's Rights (Kvindesagsforening) in 1884. She later became the chairperson of the organisation for over two periods: 1895 to 1899, and from 1903 to 1922. As chair of the Association for Women's Rights, Blehr fought for improvement of the social and economic conditions for housewives, working class and lower-middle class women. She petitioned the parliament to formalise vocational education for women by creating training courses for maids, seamstresses, cooks and housewives. Under Blehr's leadership, the association also advocated for equal pay and for children born out of wedlock to have their paternity recognised legally.

In 1885, since the Association for Women's Rights decided not to include women's suffrage on its agenda, Blehr co-founded the Women's Suffrage Association (Kvinnestemmerettsforeningen) under Gina Krog's leadership. A year later, she also helped to establish the Norwegian Women's Public Health Association (Norske Kvinners Sanitetsforening). In 1903 she was elected the chair of the Norwegian Women's Peace Association (Norske Kvinners Fredsforbund). During periods where her husband's political career required them to leave their home in Oslo and live in Sweden, she took on representative duties as the spouse of the prime minister and hostess at the Norwegian government's residence in Stockholm.

Blehr was awarded the King's Medal of Merit in Gold (Kongens fortjenstmedalje) on her 70th birthday in 1921. She died during 1928 and was buried at the Cemetery of Our Saviour in Oslo.
