= Hagbart Berner =

Norwegian politician

Hagbard Emanuel Berner MP
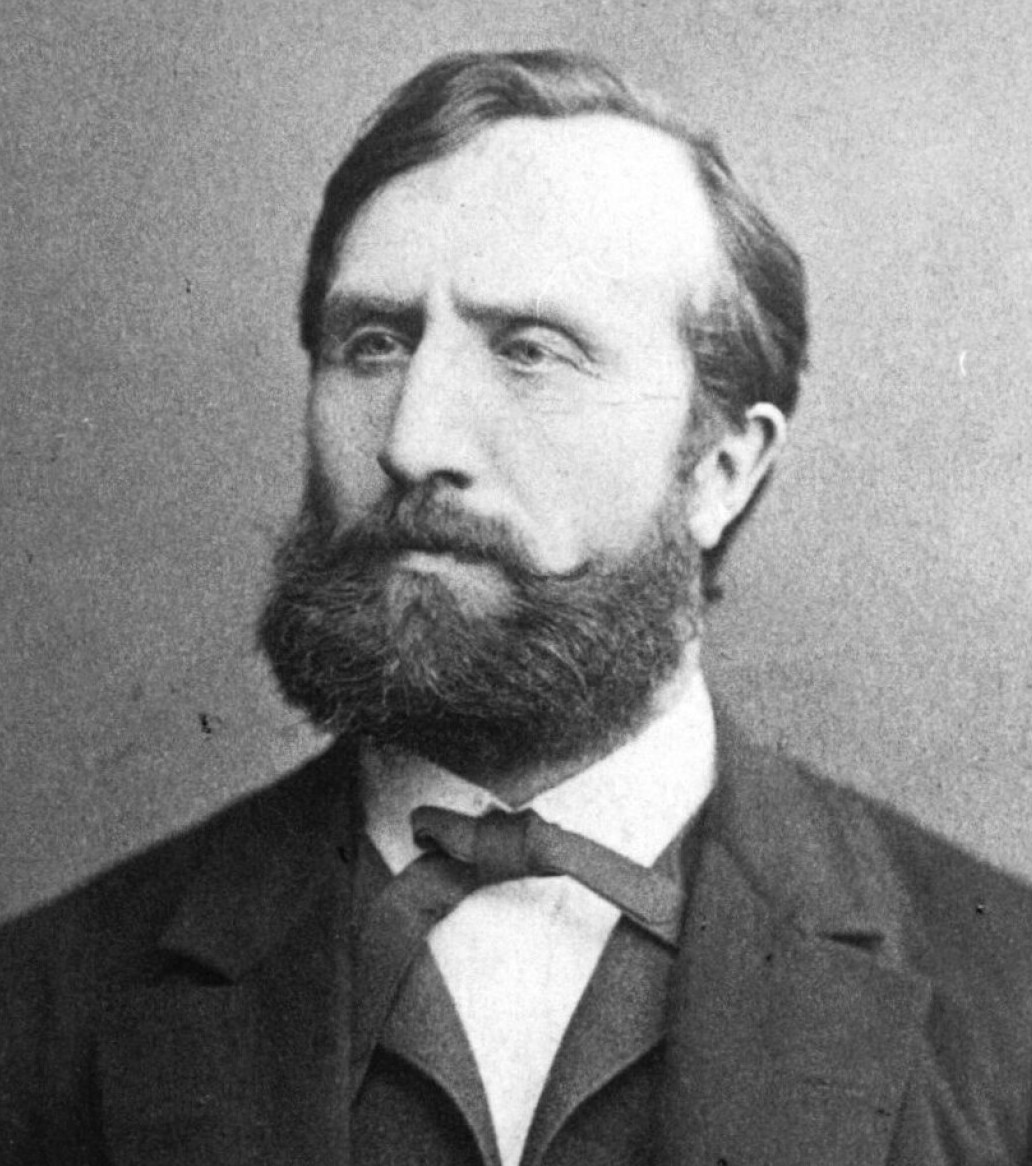

Member of the Norwegian Parliament
- In office 1880–1888
- Constituency: Akershus

Auditor General of Norway
- In office 1883–1898
- Preceded by: Peder Gaarder
- Succeeded by: Svend Borchmann Hersleb Vogt

Burgomaster of Christiania
- In office 1892–1912

1st President of the Norwegian Association for Women's Rights
- In office 1884–1885
- Succeeded by: Anna Stang

Personal details
- Born: 12 September 1839
- Died: 24 January 1920 (aged 80)
- Party: Liberal Party

Hagbart (or Hagbard) Emanuel Berner (12 September 1839 – 24 January 1920) was a Norwegian lawyer, Liberal Party politician and newspaper editor. He was one of Norway's leading liberal progressives of his time. He represented the Liberal Party as a member of parliament from 1880 to 1888, as Auditor General of Norway from 1883 to 1898 and as Burgomaster of Christiania from 1892 to 1912. He was the first editor-in-chief of the liberal newspaper Dagbladet and the co-founder (with Gina Krog) and first president of the Norwegian Association for Women's Rights. In 1882 he introduced the parliamentary act that admitted women to the university.

== Background ==
Berner was born in Sunndal Municipality in Møre og Romsdal county, Norway. He was the son of parish priest Ole Christian Berner and Laura Nicoline Collin. The family moved to Akershus county in 1850. He married Selma Augusta Hovind in 1871. He was the brother-in-law of both industrialist Hans Mustad and Hans Gerhard Stub (1849–1931), Bishop of the Norwegian Lutheran Church in America.

== Career ==
Berner graduated as a student in 1858, and as a jurist in 1863. In Christiania he befriended intellectuals such as Ernst Sars and Aasmund Olavsson Vinje, and became politically active and a supporter of the Nynorsk language. He co-founded the publishing house Det Norske Samlaget in 1868, and was its chairman until 1877.

In 1868, he co-founded the newspaper Dagbladet, together with Danish-born author and literary figure, Anthon Bang (1809–1870). He was editor of Dagbladet from 1869 to 1879. The newspaper had close connections to the political movement that later came to be the Liberal Party of Norway.

He was elected as a member of the Parliament of Norway in 1879, representing Akershus, and was re-elected in 1882 and 1885. Berner co-founded the Norwegian Association for Women's Rights in 1884, together with Gina Krog, and was the organization's first president. He was Auditor General of Norway from 1883 to 1898, and burgomaster of Kristiania from 1898 to 1912.

Media offices
Preceded by Anthon Bang	Chief editor of Dagbladet; 1869–1879	Succeeded by Nicolai A. Grevstad
Civic offices
Preceded by Peder Krabbe Gaarder	Auditor General of Norway; 1883–1898	Succeeded by Svend Borchmann Hersleb Vogt
