= Anna Louise Beer =

Norwegian lawyer and women's rights activist

- Born: 12 June 1924
- Died: 24 March 2010 (aged 85)

Anna Louise Beer (1924–2010) was a Norwegian lawyer, judge and women's rights activist who was president of the Norwegian National Women's Council from 1973 to 1979.

== Legal career ==
She studied law at the University of Oslo and graduated in 1949. She then worked in the Ministry of Justice and Police, was an assistant judge and was admitted to the bar in 1957. Since 1964 she was legal secretary at the Supreme Court, i.e. legal advisor to the court. From 1972 she was a judge at the probate court in Oslo and from 1988 to 1994 president of the court. She was a candidate for a seat on the Supreme Court in the 1970s, but was never appointed. She published several books on inheritance law.

== Politics ==
She was president of the Norwegian Association of Female Lawyers from 1960 to 1962 and president of the Norwegian National Women's Council from 1973 to 1979. She represented that organization at the World Conference on Women held in Mexico City in 1975. She was also active in the Norwegian Association for Women's Rights. Beer was considered to be rather conservative; she was known in the 1970s as an opponent of liberalizing abortion law, as well as an opponent of pornography.

She was a member of the Oslo City Council from 1977 to 1978 and represented the Liberal People's Party. She was also a member of the Appeals Committee for Gender Equality (Klagenemnda for likestilling) from 1979 to 1983 and a member of the National Tax Commission from 1980 to 1984.

== Honours ==
She was appointed a knight first class of the Order of St. Olav.
