= Anna Bugge =

Norwegian and Swedish feminist activist, lawyer, diplomat and politician

Anna Wicksell (Anna Bugge, Anna Bugge Wicksell)
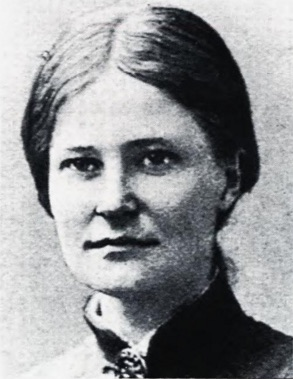

4th President of the Norwegian Association for Women's Rights
- In office 1888–1889
- Preceded by: Ragna Nielsen
- Succeeded by: Ragna Nielsen

Personal details
- Born: 17 November 1862
- Died: February 19, 1928 (aged 65)
- Spouse: Knut Wicksell
- Occupation: Lawyer, diplomat and politician

Anna Bugge Wicksell (17 November 1862 – 19 February 1928) was a Norwegian and Swedish feminist, lawyer, diplomat and politician.

She helped found the debate society Skuld in high school, and served as president of the Norwegian Association for Women's Rights (January 1888 till June 1889) after the debate on morality brought on by Ragna Nielsen's resignation.

She moved to Sweden in 1889 and became a lawyer and Swedish diplomat, and the first female member of the League of Nations' permanent mandate commission.

== Life ==
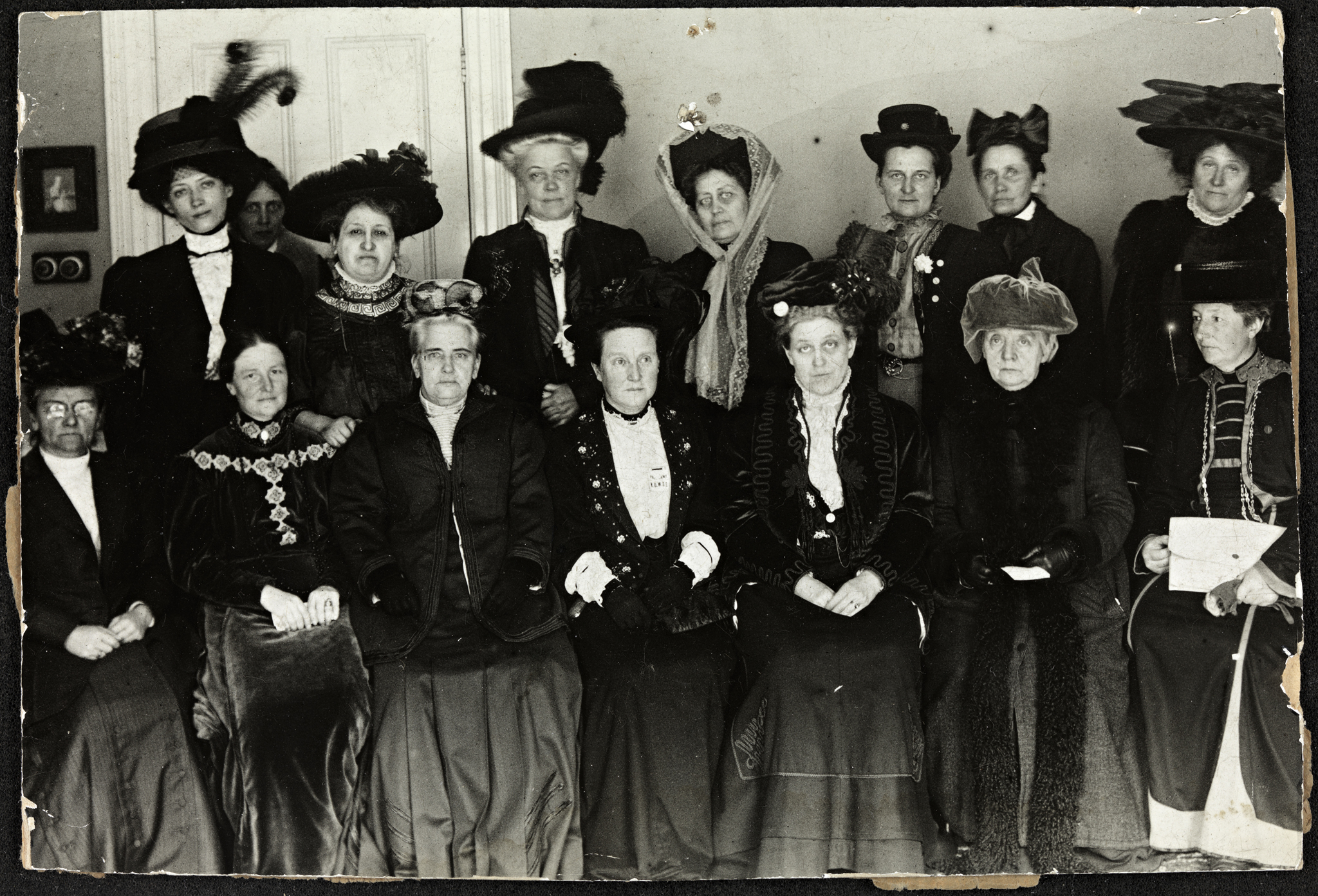
Fifth Conference of the International Woman Suffrage Alliance with Millicent Fawcett presiding, London 1909. Top row from left: Thora Daugaard (Denmark), Louise Qvam (Norway), Aletta Jacobs (Netherlands), Annie Furuhjelm (Finland), Madame Mirowitch (Russia), Käthe Schirmacher (Germany), Madame Honneger, unidentified. Bottom left: Unidentified, Anna Wicksell Bugge (Sweden), Anna Howard Shaw (USA), Millicent Fawcett (Presiding, England), Carrie Chapman Catt (USA), F. M. Qvam (Norway), Anita Augspurg (Germany).

Bugge was born in Egersund, Norway. Her particular interest was in concrete reforms; she was more occupied with the social and economic reasons for the suppression of women, rather than spiritual discussions on morality and codes of conduct. In articles from the NAWR periodical Nylænde, she emphasized women's economic independence as a necessity for their liberation. In spirit of this she was also occupied with education and organizing of women. She was one of the teachers in the "free education for women", which was initiated by other feminists. She held lectures on women's professional education and stressed that women should be allowed as apprentices in craftsmanship. In Nylænde, she spoke warm-heartedly about a pension fund for housekeepers. Bugge participated actively promoting women's suffrage, and in 1888 she traveled around in Norway as a member of the Kvindestemmeretsforening (Association for Women's Suffrage) to further promote this cause.

In 1889, Bugge "united" with Knut Wicksell without an official marriage and left Norway for Sweden, her new husband's homeland. She became a Candidate of Law at the University of Lund, Sweden, in 1911. As a result of her political work there, she became a member of the League of Nations' Permanent Mandates Commission in 1921, their first female member. She there represented Sweden as a diplomat.

In Sweden a memorial coin with her motif is in the planning.
