= Krohg =

Krohg may refer to:

- Christian Krohg (government minister) (1777–1828), Norwegian politician
- Christian Krohg (1852–1925), Norwegian naturalist painter and writer
- Hilmar Meincke Krohg (1776–1851), Norwegian politician
- Oda Krohg (1860–1935), Norwegian painter
- Per Krohg (1889–1965), Norwegian artist

== See also ==
- Krogh
- Krog (surname)
