= Crough =

Crough is a surname. Notable people with the surname include:

- Gerald Crough (born 1937–2025), Australian rules footballer
- Suzanne Crough (1963–2015), American child actress
