= Grethe Værnø =

Norwegian politician and women's rights supporter

Grethe Kathrine Værnø, née Jacobsen, (born 1938) is a Norwegian Conservative politician and writer who has played an important part in support of women's rights, both nationally and internationally. She headed the Norwegian National Women's Council from 1979 to 1981 and was Oslo's member of the Storting from 1981 to 1985.

== Biography ==
Born on 17 October 1938 in Oslo, Grethe Kathrine Jacobsen was the daughter of the factory director Klaus Jacobsen (1899–1980) and Gerda Reusch. After matriculating from high school, she trained as a secretary at the Oslo Commerce School. After studying French in Paris, she attended Harvard University (1966–1967), graduating in Norway in 1969 as Cand.philol. She was married to Norway's foreign minister and ambassador Oscar Johan Værnø (1930–1993).

Værnø served as press editor for the Norwegian National Women's Council from 1971 to 1973, becoming the organization's representative for information on developing countries (1977–1981). She worked as a freelance correspondent in Vienna (1973–1975) and Washington, D.C. (1975–1977). After her presidency of the Women's Council in 1981, she became a member of the military community and of the NATO committee (1982–1985).

== Publications ==
Værnø has published a number of books including:

- Værnø, Grethe Kathrine: "Har vi mål og midler i avspenningspolitikken?" Den Norske Atlanterhavskomite. Småhefter, 43, Oslo 1984
- Værnø, Grethe Kathrine (red.): Fred, krig og konflikt, Oslo 1987
- Værnø, Grethe Kathrine: Verneplikt, samfunnsplikt, totalforsvarstjeneste, Oslo 1988
- Værnø, Grethe Kathrine (red.): Fra arvefiende until sambo, Dialog Norge-Sverige Stockholm 1990
- Værnø, Grethe Kathrine (red.): Kvinnenes forsvarshistorie, Kvinners Frivillige Beredskap Oslo 1990
- Værnø, Grethe Kathrine: EF-faktoren i nordisk samarbeidspolitikk: mellom myter, politikk og realiteter, Oslo 1992
- Værnø, Grethe Kathrine: Lille Norden – hva nå?, Cappelen Oslo 1993
- Værnø, Grethe Kathrine: Diverse studier, Forsvarets Høgskoleforening/studiutvalg Oslo 1994–

In 2017, Værnø published an account of her activities in support of women in Blåstrømpe: Mitt kvinnepolitiske liv (Bluestocking: my political life in support of women).
