= Anna Hvoslef =

Norwegian journalist

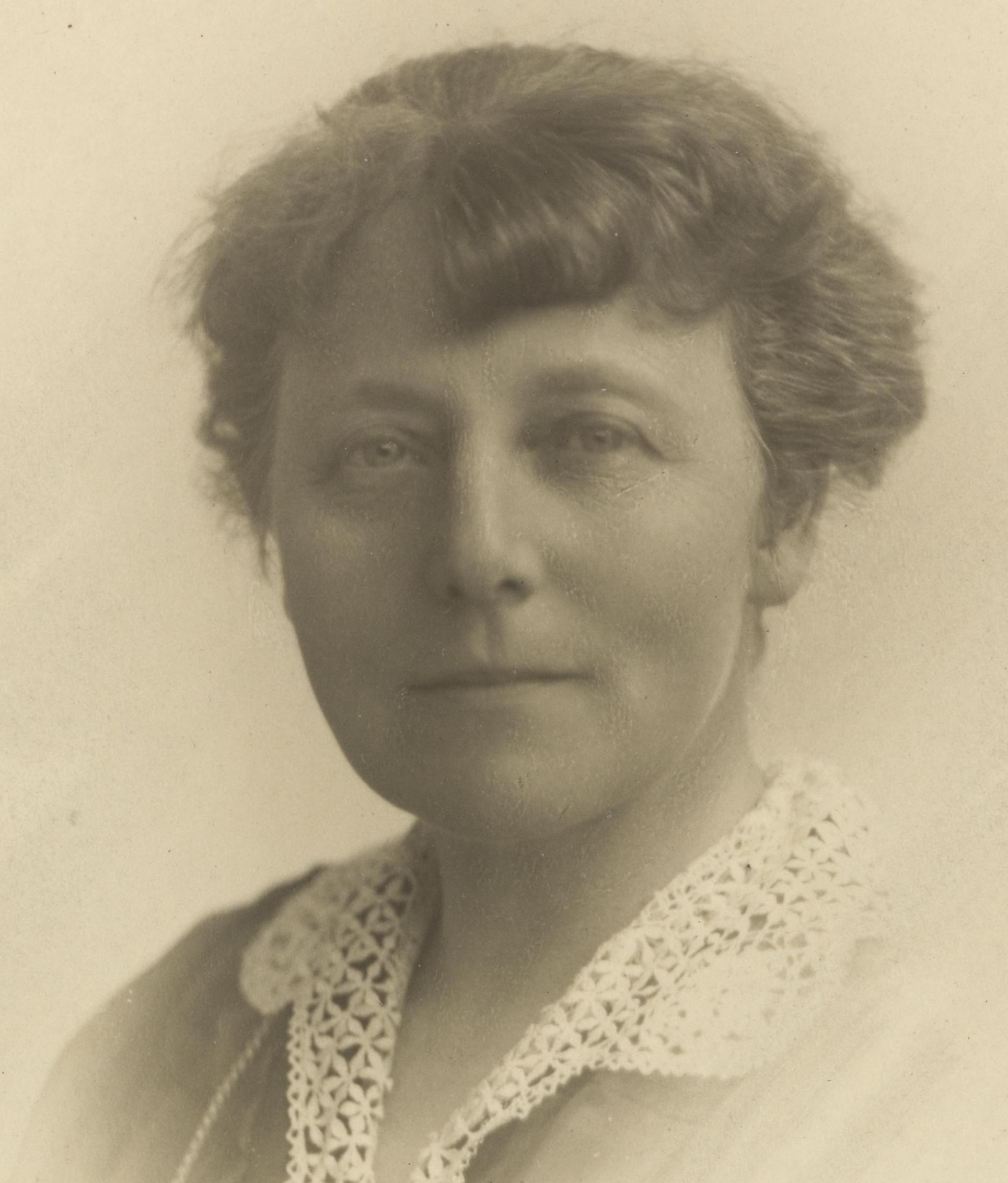

11th President of the Norwegian Association for Women's Rights
- In office 1930–1935
- Preceded by: Fredrikke Mørck
- Succeeded by: Kitty Bugge

Personal details
- Born: October 5, 1866
- Died: 11 March 1954 (aged 87)
- Party: Conservative Party
- Occupation: journalist

Anna Hvoslef (October 5, 1866 – 11 March 1954) was a Norwegian journalist, conservative politician and feminist. One of Norway's first female professional journalists, she was the first woman to work as a journalist at the major newspaper Aftenposten and served as president of the Norwegian Association for Women's Rights 1930–1935.

== Biography ==
She was born at Larvik in Vestfold, Norway. She was the daughter of Johan Christian Georg Hvoslef (1819-1889). Her father was an attorney who served as county governor of Lister og Mandals amt (now Aust-Agder).

She was one of the first Norwegian female journalists. She was employed by the leading conservative daily Aftenposten from 1897 to 1935 as its first female journalist. As a journalist, she had a main focus on literature. She also published travel literature from her travels in Europe and the Americas. She was the first female member of the Association of the Conservative Press and was president of the Norwegian Association for Women's Rights from 1930 to 1935.
