= Fredrik Arentz Krog =

Norwegian barrister

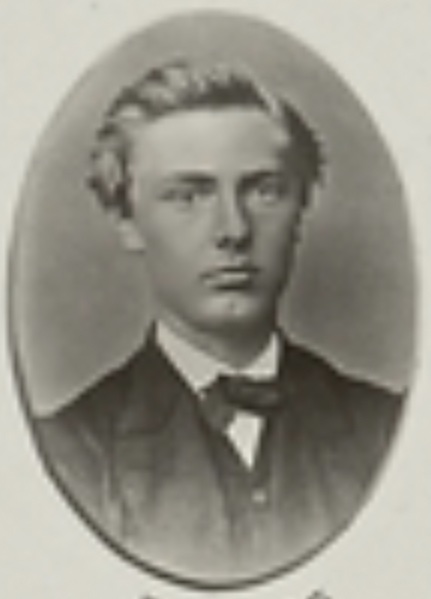
- Born: 23 October 1844; Flakstad, Norway
- Died: 6 April 1923 (aged 78); Kristiania, Norway
- Occupation: barrister
- Spouse: Cecilie Thoresen Krog
- Children: Helge Krog
- Relatives: Gina Krog (sister)
- Awards: Order of St. Olav

Fredrik Arentz Krog (23 October 1844 – 6 April 1923) was a Norwegian barrister.

== Personal life ==
Krog was born in Flakstad Municipality in Lofoten to parish priest Jørgen Sverdrup Krog and Ingeborg Anna Dass Brinchmann, and was a brother of Gina Krog. He was married to Cecilie Thoresen in 1887, and they had the son Helge Krog, who became a journalist and playwright.

== Career ==
Krog graduated as cand.jur. in 1868, and practiced as lawyer in Kristiania from 1876. He attained to barrister with access to work with Supreme Court cases in 1922. He was a board member of the railway company Hovedbanen from 1884 to 1908, and was a member of the representative council of Norges Bank. He was elected member of the City Council of Kristiania from 1894.

Krog was decorated Knight, First Class of the Order of St. Olav in 1901.
