= Birgit Borgersen Wiig =

Norwegian newspaper editor and politician

- Born: 7 April 1928; Askim, Norway
- Died: 29 May 1998 (aged 70)
- Education: University of Oslo
- Occupations: newspaper editor and politician

Birgit Henriette Borgersen Wiig (7 April 1928 – 29 May 1998) was a Norwegian newspaper editor and politician.

She was born in Askim to Halfdan Borgersen and Irma Hertha Neubauer, and graduated as cand.mag. in literary history at the University of Oslo in 1955. She was editor of the newspaper Øvre Smaalenene from 1957 to 1985, and from 1990 to 1993. For 25 years she was the only female member of the Association of Norwegian Editors. From 1968 to 1973 she chaired the Norwegian National Women's Council. From 1973 to 1977 she was deputy representative at the Storting from Østfold.
