= Kvindestemmeretsforeningen =

Norwegian suffrage organization

Kvindestemmeretsforeningen (KSF) was a Norwegian association for women suffrage, active from 1885 until 1913.

Kvindestemmeretsforeningen was founded in Kristiania by a group of ten women. Among its founders were Gina Krog, Anne Holsen, Anna Rogstad and Ragna Nielsen. It was chaired by Gina Krog from 1885 to 1897. A conflict among the members of the organization in 1897 led to the establishment of the National Association for Women's Suffrage (Landskvinnestemmerettsforeningen), chaired by Krog. Anne Holsen chaired the Kvindestemmeretsforeningen from 1897 until her death in 1913.
