= Cecilie Thoresen Krog =

Norwegian women's rights pioneer (1858–1911)

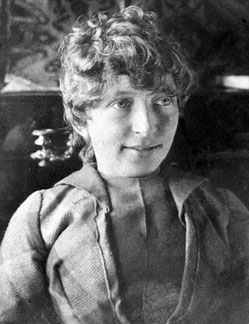
- Cecilie Thoresen Krog
- Born: Ida Cecilie Thoresen; 7 March 1858; Eidsvoll, Norway
- Died: 13 November 1911 (aged 53); Kristiania, Norway
- Occupation: Feminist pioneer
- Known for: She passed the examen artium in 1882, as the first Norwegian woman
- Spouse: Fredrik Arentz Krog
- Children: Helge Krog
- Relatives: Gina Krog (sister-in-law)

Ida Cecilie Thoresen Krog (née Thoresen; 7 March 1858 – 13 November 1911) was a Norwegian women's rights pioneer and Liberal Party politician, and the first female university student in Norway. She became famous when she was allowed to submit to examen artium in 1882, after an Act amendment had taken place. She was the first president of the women's rights association Skuld and a co-founder and vice president of its successor, the Norwegian Association for Women's Rights. She was also a co-founder and board member of the Norwegian Women's Public Health Association. She was active in the Liberal Party and her liberal views also colored her involvement in the women's rights movement. She was elected a deputy representative in Christiania City Council for the Liberal Party in 1901, as one of the first women elected to a political office in Norway.

== Personal life ==
She was born in Eidsvoll as a daughter of physician Nils Windfeldt Thoresen (1822–1907) and Marie Johanne Benneche (1827–99). She grew up together with her sister and three brothers. As a young girl she enjoyed skiing, including ski jumping. She married lawyer Fredrik Arentz Krog in 1887, and was the mother of journalist and playwright Helge Krog. She was the sister-in-law of teacher, politician and fellow women's rights activist Gina Krog. She died in Kristiania in 1911, after having suffered from infective endocarditis for several years.

== Career ==
Cecilie attended private schools and graduated from Nissen Girls School in 1879. She wanted to achieve the examen artium, but encountered problems from the authorities. A letter from her father to the Norwegian Ministry of Education and Church Affairs to allow her to field as an exam candidate was met with a refusal. She subsequently contacted the Minister of Church, who asked Royal Frederick University (now University of Oslo) for a statement. When the statement from the university was negative, she contacted member of the Parliament of Norway Hagbard Emanuel Berner, who proposed a private Act amendment, which passed in 1882. She passed the examen artium in 1882, as the first Norwegian woman.

She eventually became a student of science at the University of Oslo and later at the University of Copenhagen. She terminated her university studies when she got married in 1887 and gave birth to three children the next three years.

She was a board member of the Norwegian Association for Women's Rights from its foundation in 1884 and a board member of the humanitarian organization Norwegian Women's Public Health Association from its foundation in 1896. She was a co-founder of the Norwegian National Women's Council in 1904.
