= Julla Sæthern =

Norwegian barrister, feminist and politician

- Born: 4 December 1901
- Died: 21 February 1981 (aged 79)
- Occupations: barrister, feminist and politician
- Awards: Order of St. Olav

Julie Therese "Julla" Sæthern (4 December 1901 – 21 February 1981) was a Norwegian barrister, feminist and politician.

== Personal life and education ==
She was born on 4 December 1901 in Eidskog Municipality to Lauritz Sæthern and Martha Nilsson, and graduated as cand.jur. in 1938.

== Career ==
From 1953 to 1959 she chaired the Norwegian National Women's Council, and received honorary membership from 1968.

She was decorated Knight, First Class of the Order of St. Olav in 1972.

Sæthern died on 21 February 1981.
