= Nylænde =

Political magazine in Norway (1887–1927)

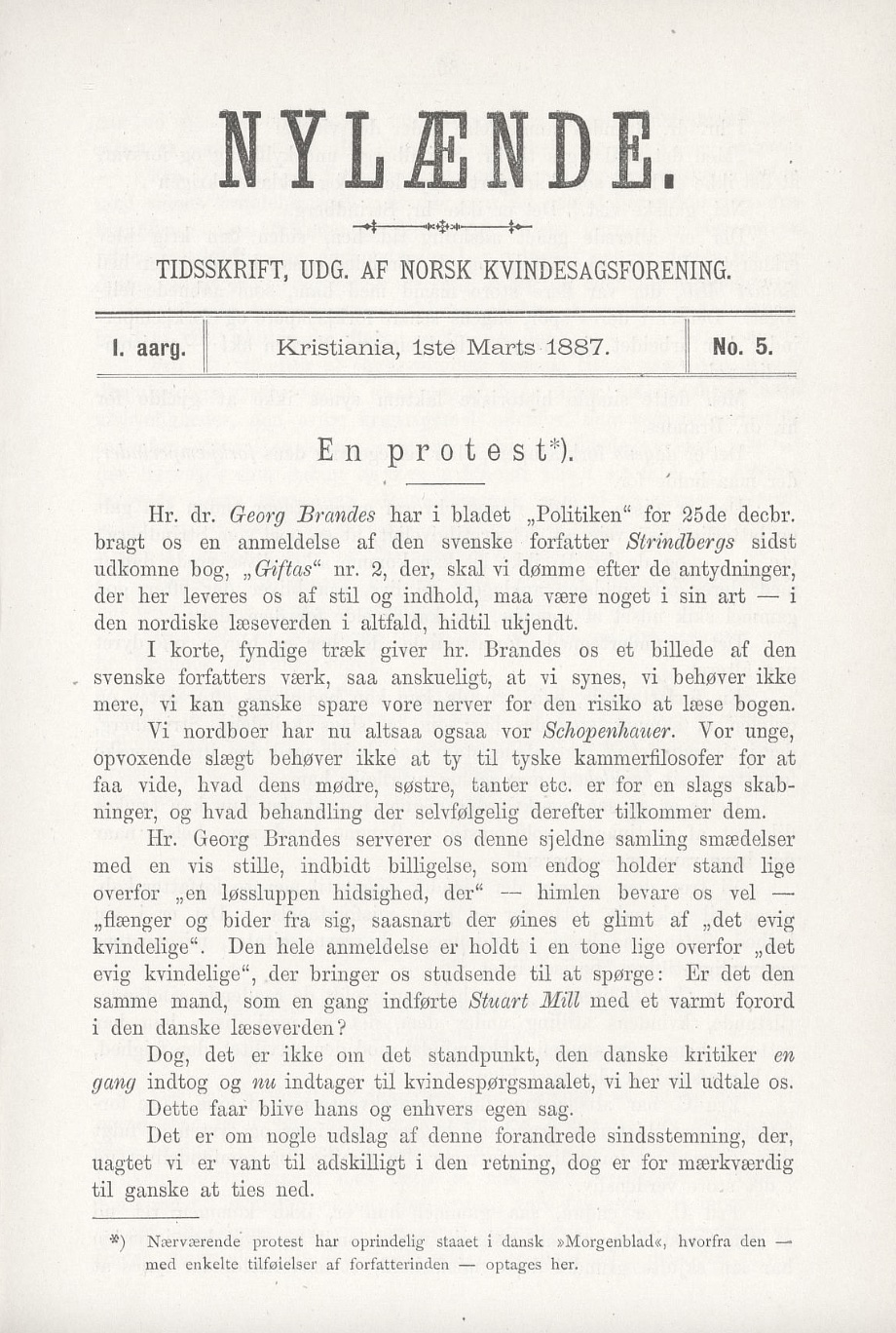
- Nylænde 1. March 1887, with a contribution by Camilla Collett
- Editor: Gina Krog, Fredrikke Mørck
- Categories: Political magazine
- Publisher: Norwegian Association for Women's Rights
- Founder: Gina Krog
- First issue: 1 January 1887
- Final issue: 15 December 1927
- Country: Norway
- Language: Norwegian
- Website: kvinnesak.no/nylaende/

Nylænde (Norwegian: New Frontiers) was a Norwegian political and cultural magazine that focused on women's rights. It was regarded as one of the most influential political magazines in Norway in its time and played an important role in the early Norwegian women's rights movement, and the struggle for women's suffrage. It was succeeded by the journal Kvinnesaksnytt in 1950.

== History and profile ==
Nylænde was published by the Norwegian Association for Women's Rights (Norwegian: Norsk Kvinnesaksforening) from 1887. The magazine was published on a biweekly basis. Its first editor was Gina Krog, who edited the magazine from 1887 until her death in 1916. Fredrikke Mørck took over as editor from 1916. The magazine ended its publication in 1927.
