= Thomas Johan Blehr =

Norwegian businessman (1924–2022)

Thomas Johan Blehr (8 February 1924 – 2 May 2022) was a Norwegian businessman.

Blehr was born in Oslo on 8 February 1924. He graduated from the Norwegian School of Economics and Business Administration in 1947, and was hired in the paint company Alf Bjercke. He eventually became CEO, but following the merger in 1972, he was the CFO of Jotun from 1972 to 1991. Blehr chaired the National Paint & Coatings Association—his employers' association—and was a member of the board of the Federation of Norwegian Industries as well as several companies. He was involved in Rotary, as a Paul Harris Fellow.

Blehr died on 2 May 2022, at the age of 98.
