= Eli Krog =

Norwegian publicist, translator and author

Eli Krog (née Meyer; 1891–1970) was a Norwegian publicist, translator and author.

== Biography ==
Eli Krog was born in Oslo, Norway. She was the daughter of newspaper editor Ludvig Meyer (1861-1938) and his second wife Augusta Gran (1865-1936). In 1912, she married journalist and playwright Helge Krog (1889–1962). The couple divorced in 1947.

Krog was an important voice in the foundation of the Norwegian Translators Association (Norsk Oversetterforening) in 1948, and was chair of the organisation from 1949-61. In 1951, she produced the first translation of the works of Nobel Prize winning British author Doris Lessing (1919–2013) into the Norwegian language. The Grass Is Singing was translated and published under the title Det synger i gresset (Gyldendal, 1951) for which she won the Bastian Prize (Bastianprisen) in 1952. Krog also edited the anthologies of author Tarjei Vesaas Huset i mørkret (Gyldendal. 1949). Her biography Lek med minner (Aschehoug, 1966) provided vivid images of the art environment surrounding her former husband, Helge Krog.
