= Gerald Crough =

Australian rules footballer (1937–2025)

Personal information
- Full name: Gerald Crough
- Born: 27 December 1937
- Died: 27 September 2025 (aged 87)
- Original team: St Pat's Ballarat
- Height: 183 cm (6 ft 0 in)
- Weight: 78 kg (172 lb)
- Positions: Wing, defence

Playing career
| Years | Club | Games (Goals) |
| 1956–62 | South Melbourne | 56 (4) |

Gerald Crough (27 December 1937 – 27 September 2025) was an Australian rules footballer who played with South Melbourne in the Victorian Football League (VFL).
