= Anthon Bang =

Danish-Norwegian writer and publisher

- Born: 9 December 1809; Copenhagen, Denmark
- Died: 31 July 1870 (aged 60)
- Occupation: Publisher
- Known for: Founding editor of Dagbladet

Anthon Bang (Copenhagen, 9 December 1809 – Christiania (now Oslo), 31 July 1870) was a Danish-Norwegian writer and publisher.

== Biography ==
He was born in Copenhagen (Denmark), and grew up in Trondheim in central Norway. He was the grandson of Carsten Gerhard Bang, manager of the Røros Copper Works.

He was educated as a military officer, but ended his military career in 1844 due to illness. From then on he lived as a publicist, wrote books and edited several magazines and newspapers. From 1860 to 1866 he published the weekly magazine Lørdags-Aftenblad for Arbeidsklassen in Christiania, and established the newspaper Dagbladet in 1869.
