= Eivind Blehr =

Norwegian politician (1881–1957)

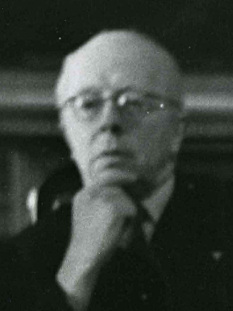
Eivind Blehr

Eivind Stenersen Blehr (20 January 1881, in Lærdal – 27 July 1957) was a Norwegian minister in the NS government of Vidkun Quisling, from 1942 to 1944. In the Norwegian post-war legal purges he was convicted of treason and sentenced to 20 years of forced labour. He was the son of former prime minister Otto Blehr and feminist Randi Blehr.
