= Helge Krog =

Norwegian journalist and playwright (1889–1962)

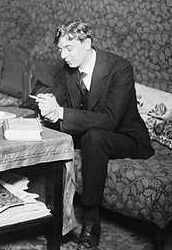
- Helge Krog in 1919
- Born: 9 February 1889; Kristiania, Norway
- Died: 30 July 1962 (aged 73)
- Occupations: Journalist; essayist; theatre and literary critic; translator; playwright
- Spouses: Eli Meyer (m. 1912; div. 1947) Tordis Maurstad (m. 1949)
- Parents: Cecilie Thoresen Krog; Fredrik Arentz Krog
- Relatives: Gina Krog (aunt)

Helge Krog (9 February 1889 – 30 July 1962) was a Norwegian journalist, essayist, theatre and literary critic, translator and playwright.

== Personal life ==
Krog was born in Kristiania, the son of jurist Fredrik Arentz Krog and Ida Cecilie Thoresen. His mother, a well-known feminist, was the first female student in Norway in 1882, and his father's sister, Gina Krog, was a central figure in the Norwegian women's suffrage movement. He was married to writer and publicist Eli Meyer from 1912 to 1947, and to actress Tordis Maurstad from 1949.

== Career ==
Krog graduated as cand.oecon. in 1911. He worked for the newspaper Verdens Gang from 1912, and from 1914 as a theatre and literary critic. He later worked for the newspapers Tidens Tegn, Arbeiderbladet and Dagbladet. He issued the article collection Meninger om bøker og forfattere in 1929 (lit. Opinions on Books and Writers), and a second collection, Meninger om mange ting (lit. Opinions on Many Things) in 1933.

His first play was the press comedy Det store Vi from 1917, which was staged at several Scandinavian theatres. The play was a great success at Nationaltheatret with almost sixty performances, Gerda Ring playing the "shop girl" character, and August Oddvar the "young journalist". The play På solsiden from 1927 was later basis for a film (in 1956). Other plays were Konkylien from 1929, and Don Juan (together with Sigurd Hoel, from 1930). The plays Underveis (1931) and Opbrudd (1936) treat women's role in society and were also of interest during the feminist movement of the 1970s.

During the interwar period Krog became known as a member of the "radical triumvirate", along with Arnulf Øverland and Sigurd Hoel.

== World War II ==
During the last part of World War II Krog lived in exile in Sweden, where he contributed to the magazine Håndslag. He published, under pseudonym, the critical article "Nazi-Tysklands krigspotensial og den 6-te kolonne i Norge" in 1944, an article which was subject to much debate, also after the war. The pamphlet was reissued in an expanded version in 1946, questioning the contributions from the Norwegian large-scale industry to the warfare of Nazi Germany (Norwegian: 6. kolonne -? Om den norske storindustriens bidrag til Nazi-Tysklands krigføring).

He died in Oslo.
