= Gina Krog =

Norwegian politician and women's rights activist, editor (1847–1916)

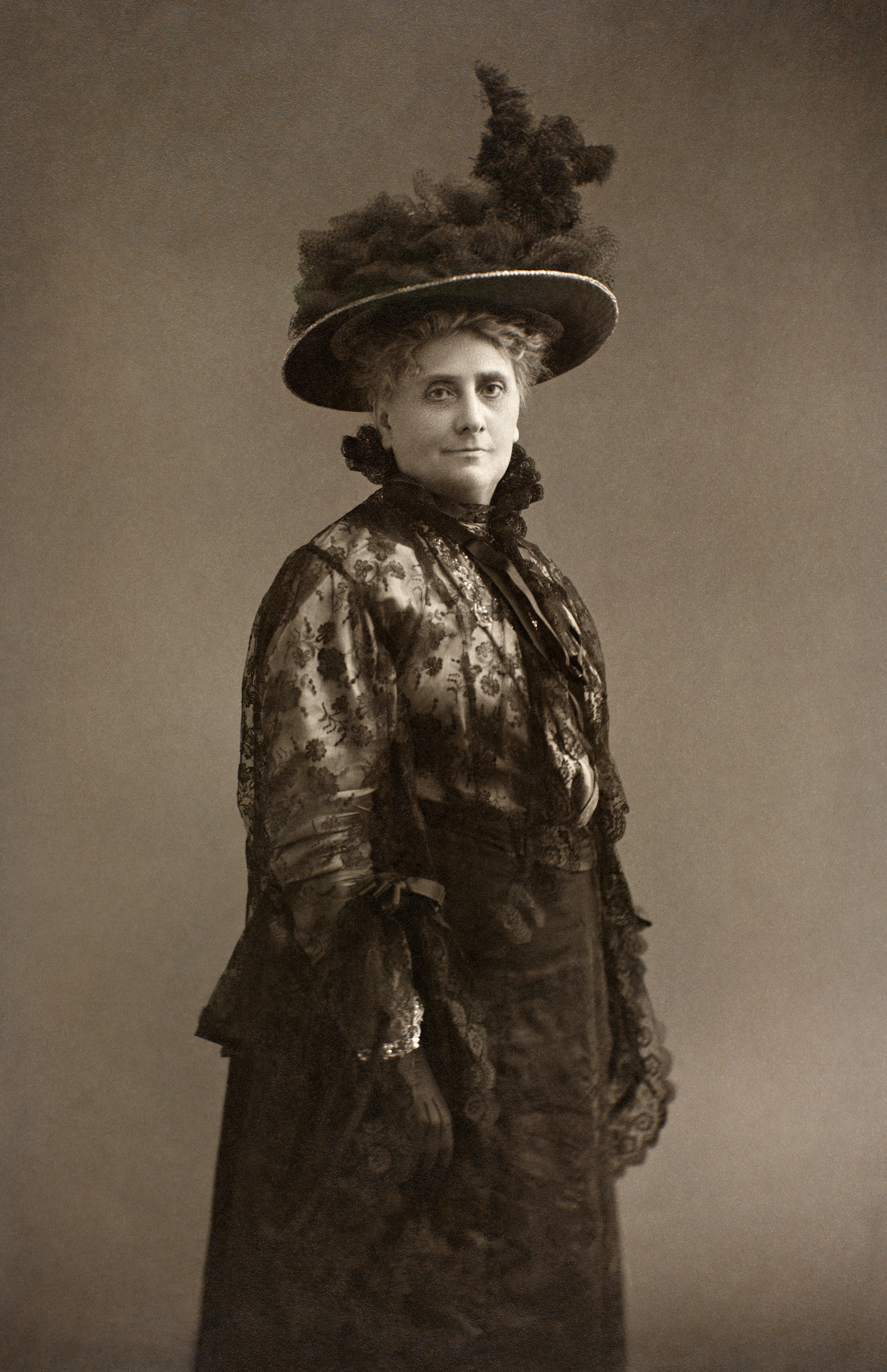
- Gina Krog
- Born: Jørgine Anna Sverdrup Krog; 20 June 1847; Flakstad, United Kingdoms of Sweden and Norway
- Died: 14 April 1916 (aged 68)
- Burial place: Vår Frelsers gravlund
- Occupations: Editor, teacher and suffragist
- Years active: 1880–1916
- Organization(s): Norwegian Association for Women's Rights, Women's Voting Association, National Association for Women's Suffrage, and Norwegian National Women's Council
- Known for: Feminist pioneer
- Political party: Liberal Party
- Movement: Women's suffrage
- Relatives: Fredrik Arentz Krog (brother); Helge Krog (nephew); Cecilie Thoresen Krog (sister-in-law)

Jørgine Anna Sverdrup "Gina" Krog (20 June 1847 – 14 April 1916) was a Norwegian suffragist, teacher, liberal politician, writer and editor, and a major figure in liberal feminism in Scandinavia.

She played a central role in the Norwegian liberal women's rights movement from the 1880s until her death, notably as a leading campaigner for women's right to vote. In 1884, Krog co-founded the Norwegian Association for Women's Rights with liberal MP Hagbart Berner. Over the next two decades, Krog co-founded the Women's Voting Association, the National Association for Women's Suffrage, and the Norwegian National Women's Council, spearheading the presentation of women's suffrage proposals to the Storting (the Norwegian parliament). Krog wrote articles and gave speeches, travelling throughout Europe and North America to attend international women's rights conferences. She was editor of the Norwegian feminist periodical Nylænde (New Land) from 1887 until her death in 1916. She was an early member of the Liberal Party and served as a deputy member of its national board. Krog was strongly inspired by the American liberal women's rights movement spearheaded by Susan B. Anthony and Elizabeth Cady Stanton.

Krog was regarded as an unapologetic liberal progressive during her time, seeking full and equal voting rights for all women on the same conditions as men. In the 19th century these views brought Krog into conflict with more moderate members of the Norwegian women's movement, many of whom argued for narrower approaches, focusing first on enfranchising privileged women; before 1900 only men of certain means and position had the right to vote as well. In 1910, the Storting granted universal voting rights to women for municipal elections, extending this to general elections in 1913.

Krog was the first woman in Norway to receive a state funeral. Since 2009, the Norwegian Association for Women's Rights has awarded the biennial Gina Krog Prize for feminist advocates.

== Early life ==
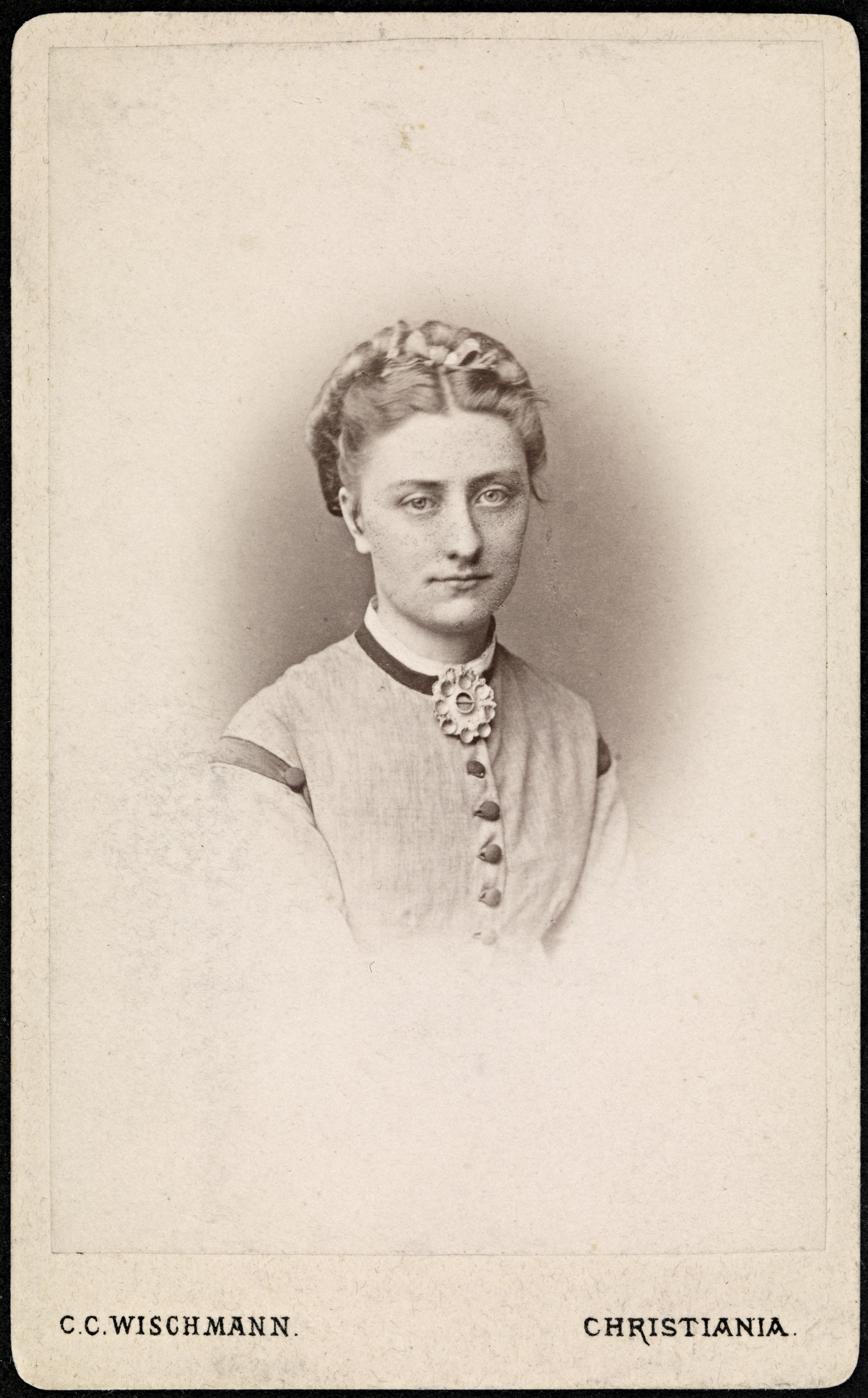
Carte de visite of Gina Krog, ca. 1873.

Jørgine Anna Sverdrup "Gina" Krog was born on 20 June 1847 in Flakstad Municipality, Lofoten as the daughter of parish priest Jørgen Sverdrup Krog (1805–1847) and Ingeborg Anna Dass Brinchmann (1814–1872). Gina Krog's brother was barrister Fredrik Arentz Krog. After her father's early death, Krog lived with her mother in Karmøy Municipality until she was eight years old, and then moved to Christiania. In Christiania, she attended a school for girls.

As a young adult, she worked as a teacher in private schools for several years, continuing to improve her knowledge of languages and literature through self-study. Through her brother, she became the aunt of writer Helge Krog and the sister-in-law of feminist Cecilie Thoresen Krog. Krog was among the first women to go hiking in the mountains of Jotunheimen, which gave her a reputation as a "mountaineer". She never married.

== Suffrage work ==
In 1880, Krog gave up her teaching career permanently in order to advocate for women's rights. She travelled to Great Britain, where she stayed at Bedford College and made contacts within the National Union of Women's Suffrage Societies, including its leader Millicent Garrett Fawcett. While in Britain, Krog wrote articles and sent them back to Norwegian newspapers, at first using pseudonyms. Her experiences with the British suffrage movement helped develop her own feminist views. In contrast to more moderate feminists of the time – who focused on more generally improving the economic conditions of women – Krog's views were considered radical: a demand for full political rights for women. Her goal was the achievement of women's suffrage in conditions equal with men, without compromise. In her arguments, Krog emphasized the common human qualities shared by men and women, reasoning that anyone who paid taxes and accepted civic responsibilities should receive the same freedoms and political status. Although some suffragists preferred to focus on gender differences, claiming women had special feminine qualities that made them deserving of the vote, Krog avoided using this rhetoric.

Upon returning to Norway, in 1883 Krog became a founding member of the first Norwegian women's business club. The following year, she was one of the first Norwegian women to engage in a public debate, tackling women's rights in a three-day debate organized by students. In 1884, Krog co-founded the Norwegian Association for Women's Rights (Norwegian: Norsk Kvinnesaksforening) together with its first chairman Hagbard Emanuel Berner. The association initially attracted 220 members, both women and men, and was based out of Kristiania. It was decided that the association would focus on supporting women's education, work benefits and marriage rights. When Berner drafted the association's mission statement, he declared a neutral purpose of aiming "to provide the woman with her right and place in society". Many association members shared the view that women's suffrage should not be considered a priority, since Norwegian women "had not shown sufficient interest in participating in politics". Krog, however, wanted the association to pursue equal voting rights for men and women, and her position brought her into direct conflict with Berner.

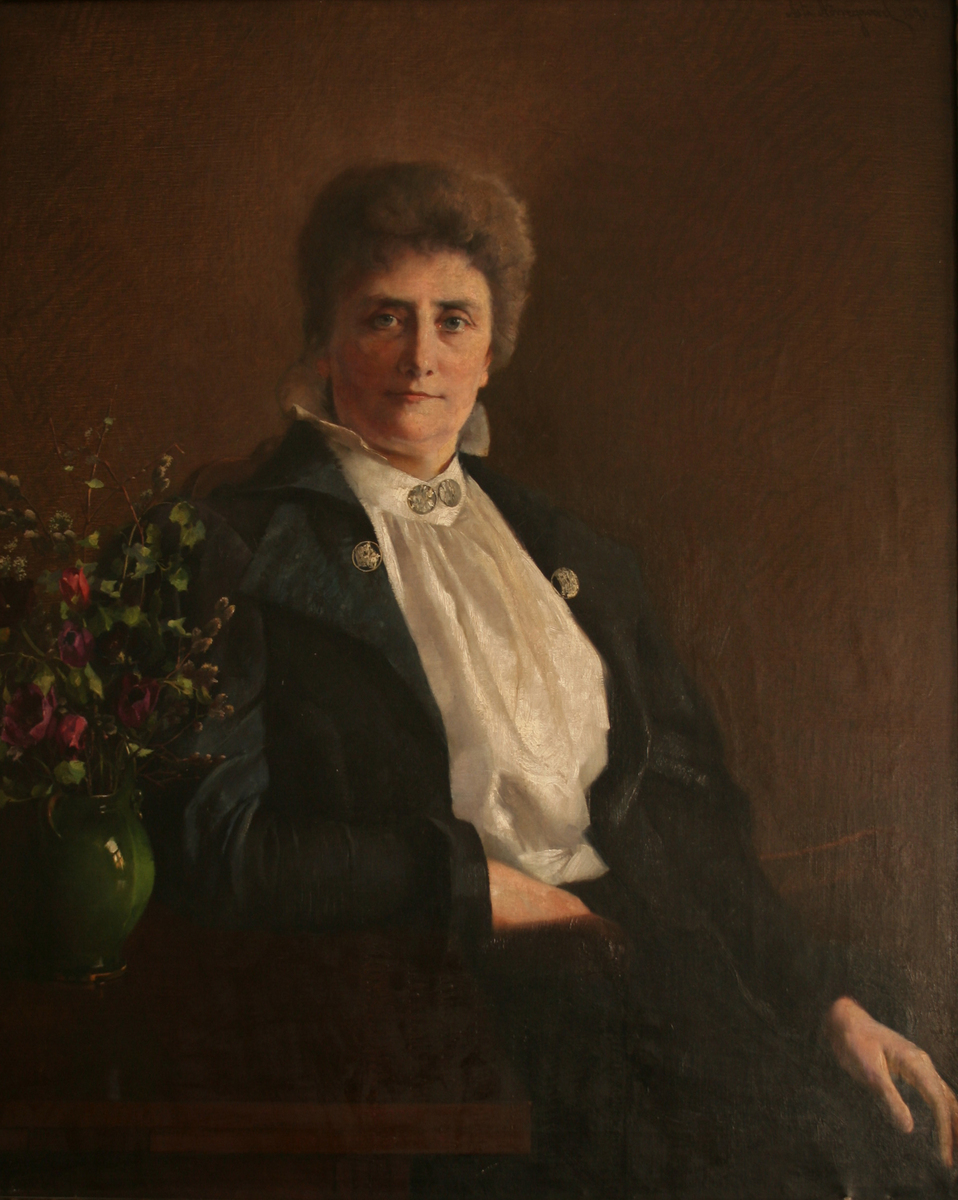
Gina Krog, painted by Asta Nørregaard. The painting is owned by the Norwegian Association for Women's Rights.

In 1884, Krog wrote a series of articles for the magazine Nyt Tidsskrift, entitled "Some Words on the Development of Women's Affairs and Nearest Tasks in Our Country", urging women to take on more leadership roles in support of women's rights. The following year, when Krog gave a talk entitled "Voting for Women", Berner resigned as chairman in protest. Despite her disagreements about the association's direction, Krog edited its periodical Nylænde (New Land) from its start in 1887 until her death in 1916.

In December 1885, Krog co-founded the Women's Voting Association (Norwegian: Kvinnestemmerettsforeningen) alongside nine other women from the Association for Women's Rights. Her co-founders included Ragna Nielsen, Anne Holsen and Anna Rogstad. Krog was leader of the association from 1885 to 1897. She had been inspired by reading The History of Woman Suffrage, a set of historical volumes sent by American women's rights activist Susan B. Anthony. The Women's Voting Association was open only to women members, with the philosophy that women should be responsible for achieving their own political equality.

Despite the Women's Voting Association's efforts, however, their initial suffrage proposals were unsuccessful. In 1886, the association submitted the first Norwegian proposal for women's suffrage to the Storting (the Norwegian Parliament), but the proposal was rejected by lawmakers in 1890, defeated by 114 to 44 votes. In response, Women's Voting Association members decided to adjust their goals and fight only for local municipal voting rights instead—an idea proposed by Berner. Krog refused to agree to this strategy. In 1893, a new women's suffrage proposal was submitted to the Storting, and although it received support from more than 50 percent of parliament members, it did not reach the necessary two-thirds support it needed to create constitutional change. Women's suffrage in Norway had formerly benefited from strong support from the Liberal Party. During the 1890s, however, many liberal politicians had withdrawn from the cause, expressing fears that women with the vote would naturally gravitate towards supporting conservative candidates. The women's movement claimed a number of smaller victories during this time: women were permitted to become members of school and child welfare boards and received the right to vote in local alcohol prohibition referendums.

In 1896, Norwegian lawmakers granted voting rights to all taxpaying men, but again refused to grant voting rights to women. Two years later, men received universal suffrage.

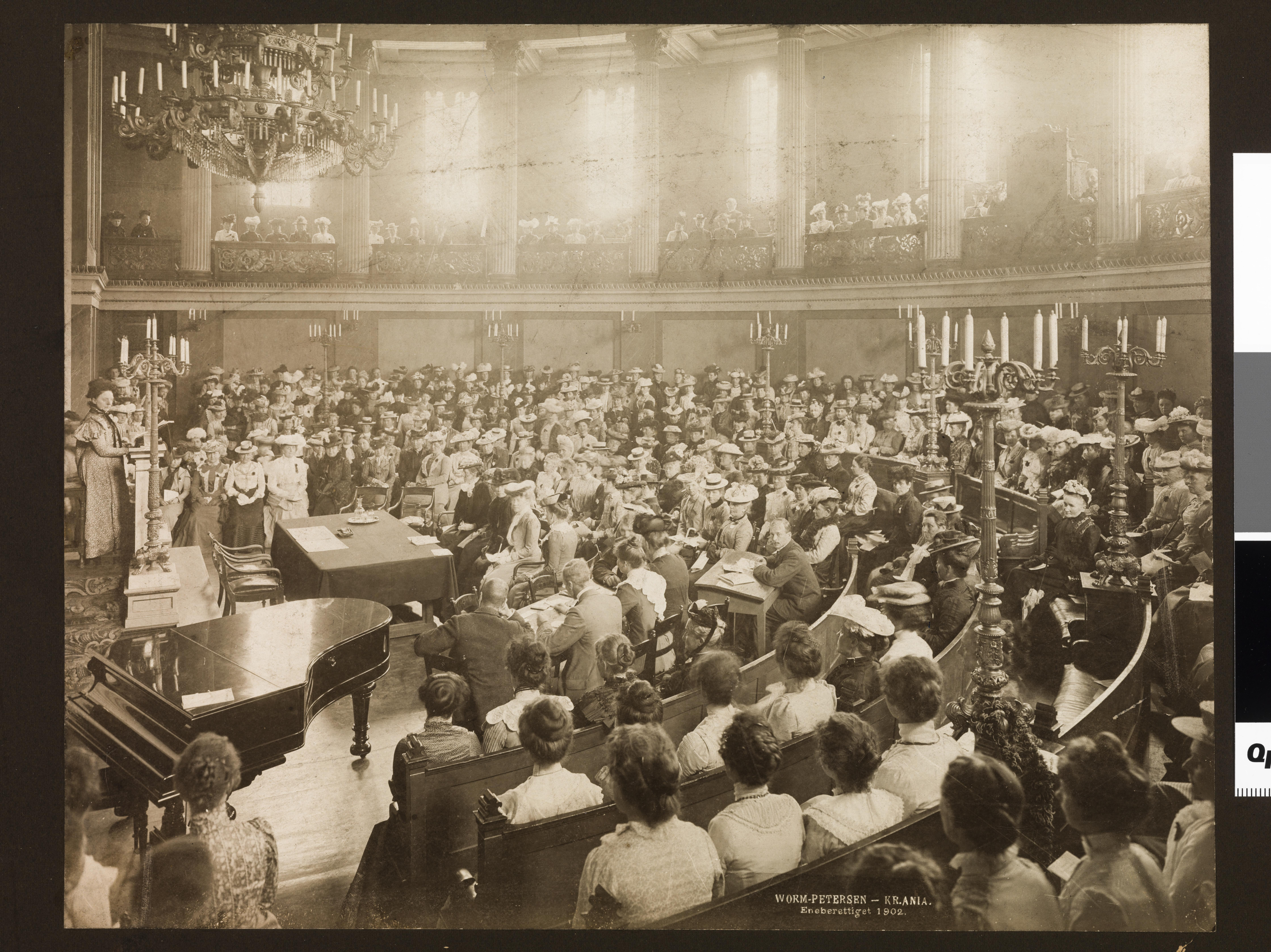
Gina Krog and Fredrikke Marie Qvam at a Nordic Women's Congress in Oslo (1902)

Disagreements within the Women's Voting Association meant that the association began splitting into two factions. All members were middle-class women, and this affected the association's views on whether or not the vote should be granted to women of all classes. Although some, including Krog, continued to argue for universal women's suffrage, the majority wanted to pursue partial, property-based suffrage instead. Krog remained firm in her belief that women must fight for complete voting rights "on the same conditions as men", regardless of class. In 1897, Krog left the Women's Voting Association and subsequently established the Norwegian National Association for Women's Suffrage (Norwegian: Landskvinnestemmerettsforeningen) alongside women's rights activist Fredrikke Marie Qvam.

In 1899, Krog attended a Congress meeting of the International Council of Women in London, England, where she was named an honorary vice-president of the council, representing Norway. Krog accepted responsibility for creating a Norwegian branch of the International Council of Women, and began making plans. After much petitioning, the Norwegian government granted limited voting rights to women in 1901. Norwegian women who owned property – or whose husbands owned property – could now vote in municipal elections. The National Association for Women's Suffrage was admitted as a member of the International Woman Suffrage Alliance in 1904.

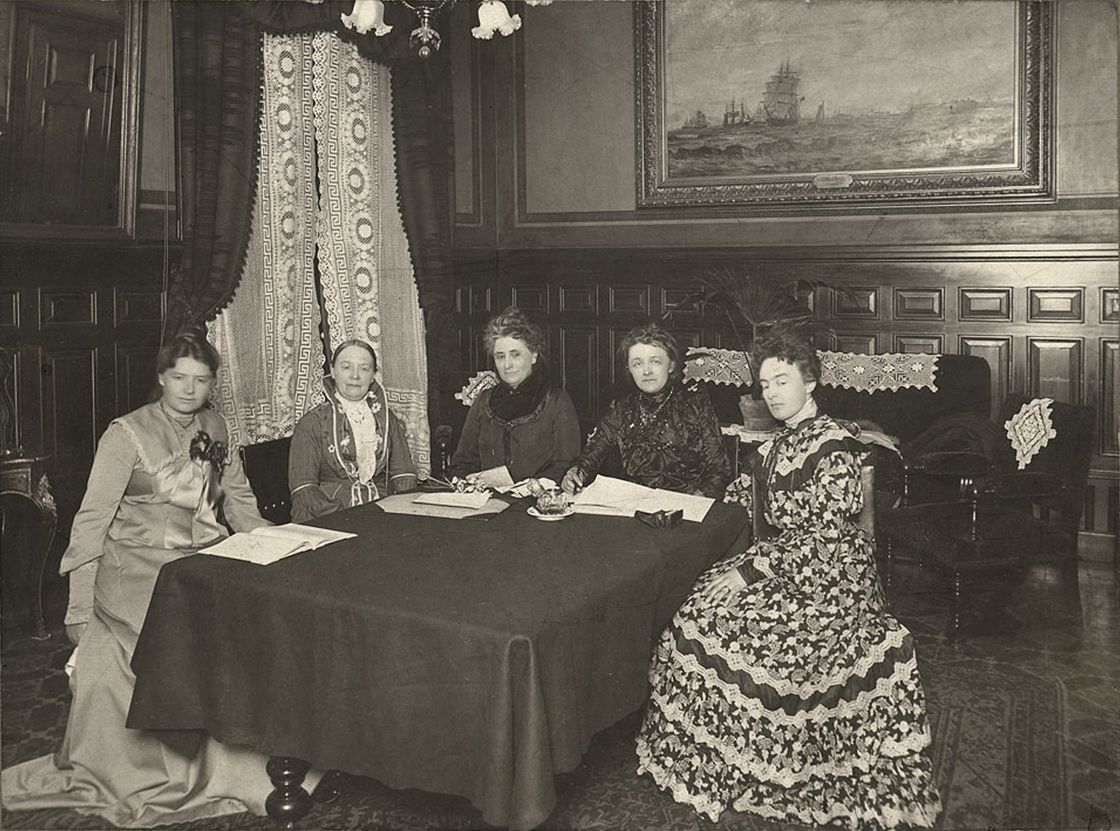
Norwegian National Women's Council members, from left: Karen Grude Koht, Fredrikke Marie Qvam, Gina Krog, Betzy Kjelsberg and Katti Anker Møller (1904)

In 1904, Krog founded the Norwegian National Women's Council (Norwegian: Norske Kvinners Nasjonalråd), a regional branch of the International Council of Women. The branch was notably active the following year, when the Storting held a national vote on the dissolution of the union between Norway and Sweden. The Norwegian National Women's Council campaigned in support of the dissolution, circulating a brochure advocating for Norwegian independence. Only men were permitted to cast a vote in the decision, despite calls from women who wanted to participate. On 13 August 1905, the day of the dissolution vote, Krog led female delegates from the most prominent Norwegian women's organizations into the Storting building, informing government that thousands of Norwegian women wished to vote their approval of the dissolution. Having organized a nation-wide poll among women, the women later presented a petition with 300,000 names. The incident impressed parliament members, contributing to serious discussions about granting suffrage to women.

By 1906, the National Association for Women's Suffrage had continued to grow, with 40 local branches and 2500 members across the country. The association was increasingly better positioned to lobby politicians in all parts of Norway.

Krog was part of the official Norwegian delegate sent to Amsterdam for the Fourth Conference of the International Woman Suffrage Alliance in 1908. She was an early member of the Norwegian Liberal Party, and in 1909 she was elected a deputy member of its national board. Krog visited Toronto, Canada, for an International Council of Women meeting. She followed up the meeting with a tour of the United States where she gave speeches about the Norwegian women's suffrage movement. That same year, Krog's fellow activist Anna Rogstad was elected a deputy MP, becoming the first female member of the Storting.

In 1910, Norwegian women were granted universal suffrage in local elections. In 1913, the Storting voted unanimously to extend universal women's suffrage to general elections.

== Death and legacy ==
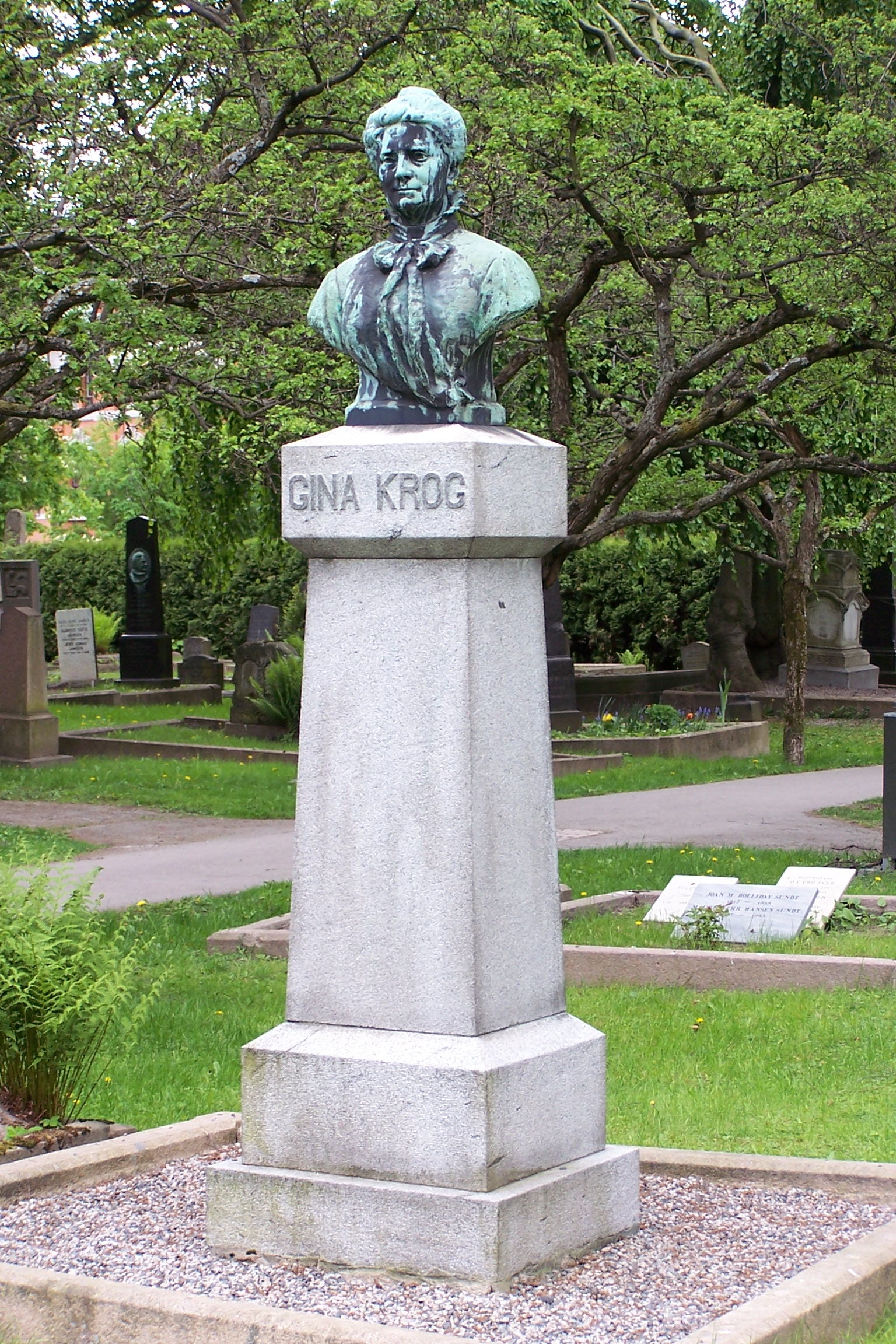
Bronze bust of Gina Krog at Vår Frelsers gravlund

Krog died on 14 April 1916, during an influenza epidemic. She was the first woman in Norway to be honoured with a funeral at public expense. Several female university graduates provided a guard of honour, and the Norwegian mezzo-soprano Bergljot Bjørnson sang. Krog's funeral was attended by the Prime Minister, the President of the Storting, and the Chief Justice of the Supreme Court. A bronze bust of Krog, sculpted by Ambrosia Tønnesen in 1919, is located at her grave at Vår Frelsers gravlund in Oslo.

There are streets named Gina Krog's Way at Persaunet in Trondheim, named in 1956, as well as in the district of Lambertseter, Oslo. The Gina Krog Prize, awarded by the Norwegian Association for Women's Rights since 2009, is also named in her honour, and the prize is given to Norwegian women for work promoting feminist issues.

In March 2013, the Norwegian Ministry of Petroleum and Energy announced that the Dagny oil field would be renamed Gina Krog in her honour.
