= Norwegian Women's Public Health Association =

Humanitarian organisation in Oslo, Norway

NKS logotype

The Norwegian Women's Public Health Association (Norske Kvinners Sanitetsforening) or NKS is the largest women's organisation and one of the leading humanitarian organisations of Norway. It is open to women and men and was founded on the initiative of the Norwegian Association for Women's Rights in 1896. The organization's main areas of focus are women's health and living conditions. It is involved in humanitarian work, such as running hospitals and nursing homes. The association currently has 750 local branches and ca. 50,000 members, although at one point, it had 250,000 members. NKS is a member of the Norwegian Women's Lobby umbrella organization.

== History ==
NKS was founded in 1896 following initiatives by Fredrikke Marie Qvam, Randi Blehr, Cecilie Thoresen Krog and Margrethe Vullum. It was established on the initiative of the Norwegian Association for Women's Rights. In 1898, NKS opened a school for the education of nurses with military service. In 1899, the fight against tuberculosis was initiated.

One of the early members was principal was Pylle Horst, wife of Hans Jacob Horst, one of the founders of a liberal newspaper, Nordposten. The major figure in the organisation's early history was Fredrikke Marie Qvam, its principal founder and chairman from 1896 to 1933. The wife of Prime Minister Ole Anton Qvam, she was also a former chairman of the Norwegian Association for Women's Rights.

== Related reading ==
- Folkvord, Magnhild (2013) Fredrikke Marie Qvam : rabaldermenneske og strateg (Oslo: Det Norske Samlaget) ISBN 978-82-521-8300-9
