= Fredrikke Marie Qvam =

Norwegian humanitarian leader, feminist and liberal politician

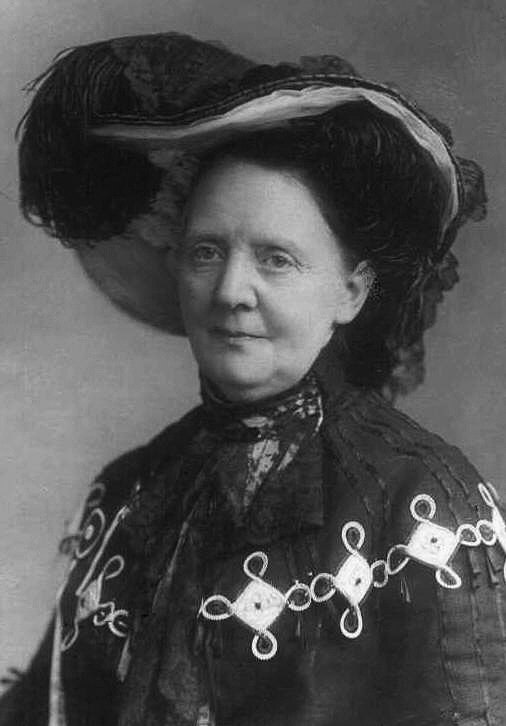

7th President of the Norwegian Association for Women's Rights
- In office 1899–1903
- Preceded by: Randi Blehr
- Succeeded by: Randi Blehr

1st President the Norwegian Women's Public Health Association
- In office 1896–1933
- Succeeded by: Anna Welle Grue

Personal details
- Born: Fredrikke Marie Gram; 31 May 1843
- Died: 10 September 1938 (aged 95)
- Party: Liberal Party
- Spouse: Ole Anton Qvam

Fredrikke Marie Qvam (née Gram) (31 May 1843 – 10 September 1938) was a Norwegian humanitarian leader, feminist, liberal politician and the wife of Prime Minister Ole Anton Qvam. She was the founder (1896) of the Norwegian Women's Public Health Association that grew to become Norway's largest women's organisation with 250,000 members, and served as its first President from 1896 to 1933, and as its Honorary President from 1933 until her death. She also served as president of the Norwegian Association for Women's Rights from 1899 to 1903. She was widely regarded as one of the most influential and successful political lobbyists of her time, and was described in the journal Samtiden in 1915 as the "Queen of the corridors." She was addressed as "Madam Cabinet Minister" (Norwegian: Statsraadinde) and later as "Madam Prime Minister" (Norwegian: Statsministerinde), using her husband's titles.

== Early life and marriage ==
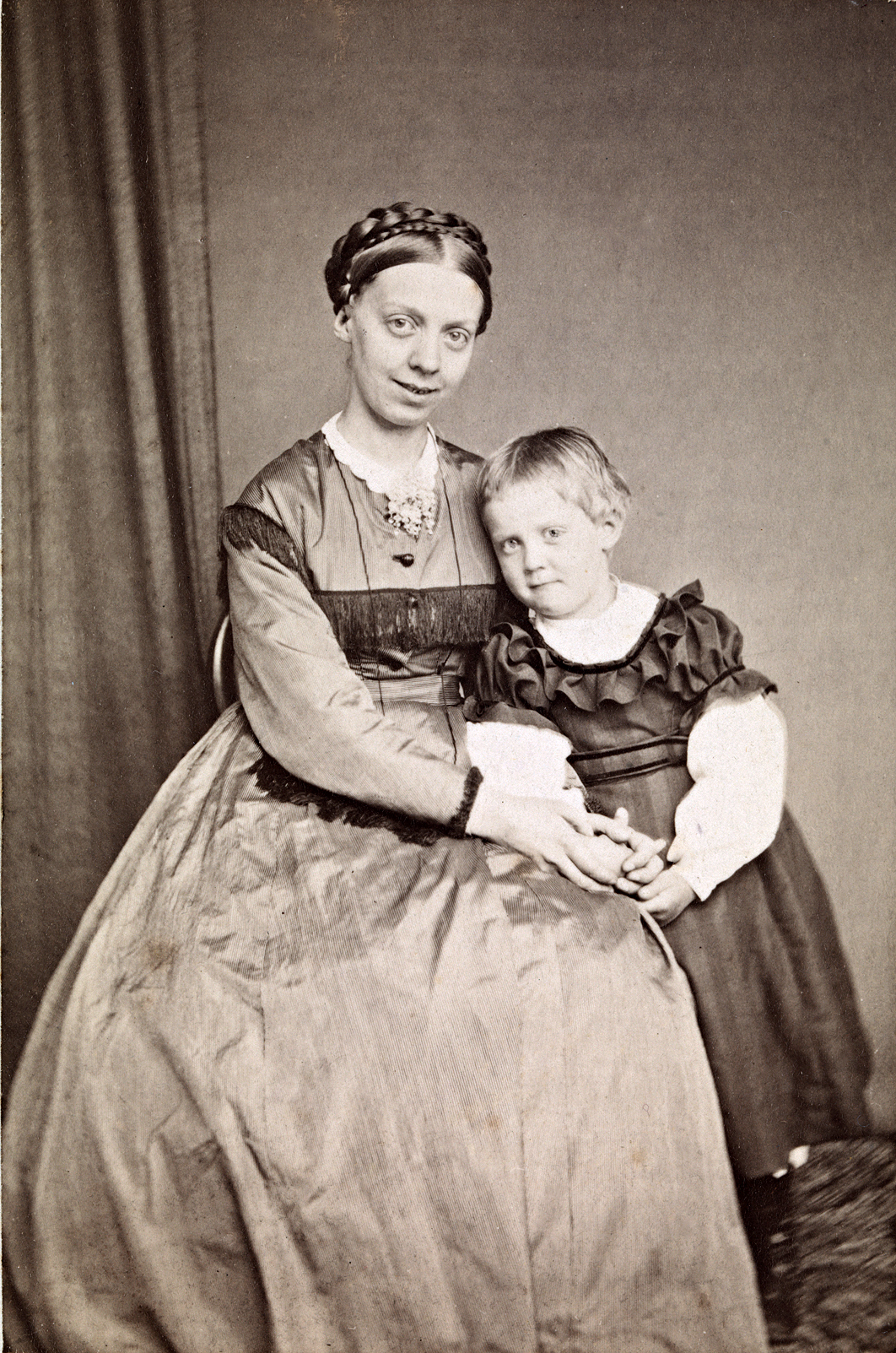
Fredrikke Marie Qvam with daughter Louise.

Qvam was born Fredrikke Marie Gram in Trondheim to merchant David Andreas Gram and Louise Augusta Gram (née Bing). In 1849, the family moved to the manor Helge-By-Rein in Steinkjer. There she spent much time outdoors in sports like skiing, skating, and riding. Her parents were liberal for the time, and her mother in particular wanted her daughters to be educated and trained in sports. The family was socially well connected and culturally involved and among their guests were Bjørnstjerne Bjørnson, Ole Bull, Aasmund Olavsson Vinje and Peter Chr. Asbjørnsen.

Fredrikke Marie Gran met her husband, Ole Anton Qvam, in 1857 when he was tutoring her. He was born in 1831 to a family of farmers in Molde, had taken examen artium and worked as a teacher in private home. They became secretly engaged in 1858 and married in 1865 after Ole Anton Qvam had finished law studies in Kristiania in 1862. In 1873, the couple bought the Gjævran farm and moved there. They had five children, of which two died in childhood and two while they were young. Three of the children died of tuberculosis, in 1878, 1889, and 1893 respectively. She later stated that the sorrow she felt when experiencing her children die of ill health was one of the things that motivated her to found the Norwegian Women's Public Health Association.

Ole Anton Qvam established a law practice in Steinkjer and was also involved in local business and politics for the Liberal Party. He was elected to the Parliament of Norway for the first time in 1874. As he was often away, a lot of the responsibilities for running the farm thus fell on Fredrikke Marie Qvam. Being highly interested in politics and public affaires she often felt that her life at the farm was quite unsatisfactory; in a letter to her husband she wrote that she felt her life was wasted.

== Organizational work ==
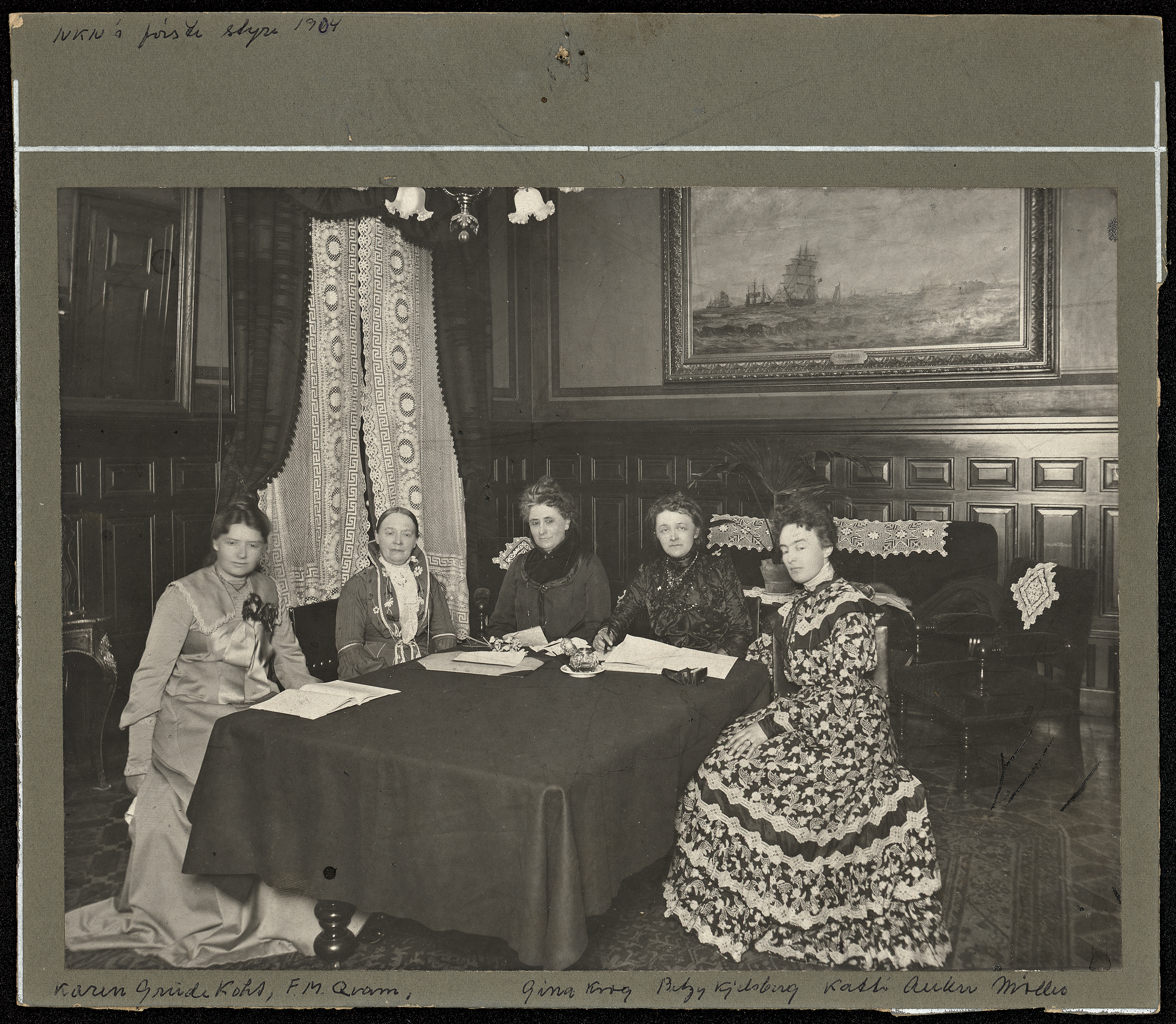
A meeting in Norwegian Women's national council in 1904. Fredrikke Marie Qvam number two from left.

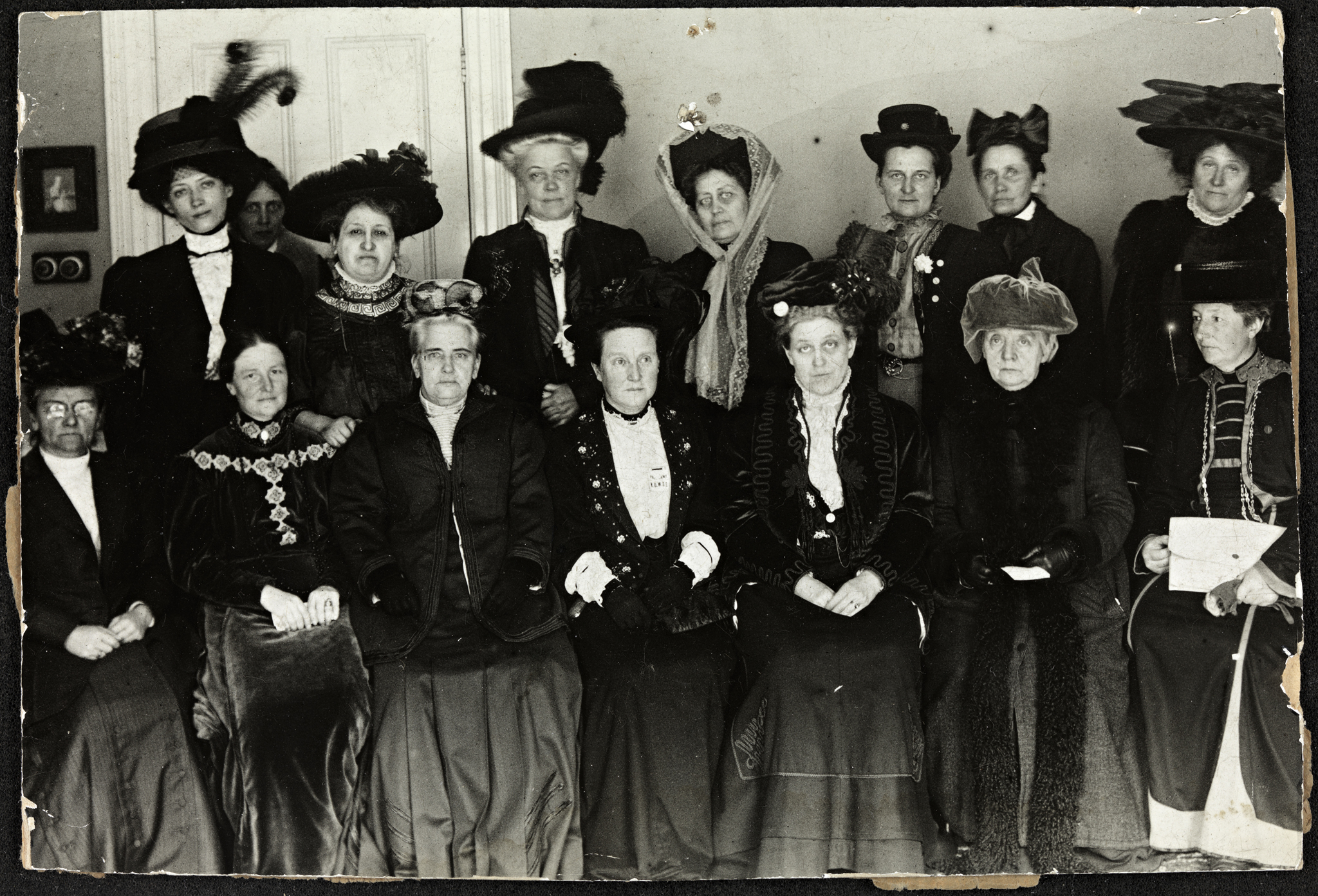
Fifth Conference of the International Woman Suffrage Alliance with Millicent Fawcett presiding, London 1909. Top row from left: Thora Daugaard (Denmark), Louise Qvam (Norway), Aletta Jacobs (Netherlands), Annie Furuhjelm (Finland), Madame Mirowitch (Russia), Käthe Schirmacher (Germany), Madame Honneger, unidentified. Bottom left: Unidentified, Anna Bugge Wicksell (Sweden), Anna Howard Shaw (USA), Millicent Fawcett (Presiding, England), Carrie Chapman Catt (USA), F. M. Qvam (Norway), Anita Augspurg (Germany).

Ole Anton and Frerikke Marie Qvam moved to Kristiania in 1893, when she was 50 years old. There Fredrikke Qvam soon became involved in the women's rights movement and other political activities.

In 1896, Qvam was among the founders of the Norwegian Women's Public Health Association and became its leader. The organization's stated purpose at the start was to provide medical supplies for use both in war and accidents during peacetime, to educate women in first aid, to educate nurses, and to fight common diseases like tuberculosis and rheumatism. The background was to a large degree the tense situation between Sweden and Norway as a result of increasing Norwegian demands for independence from Sweden. In addition to focusing on health issues and social policies, the organization also became a meeting point for women concerned about voting rights for women and Norwegian independence from Sweden.

Qvam also became a member of the Women Voting Rights Association that was formed in Kristiania in 1895. The association's purpose was to advocate for full female voting rights, in both national and local elections. The association managed to get the Norwegian parliament to debate the case in 1890, but a proposal to give voting rights to women fell with 70 votes against and 44 for the proposal. In 1898, all men over 25 years obtained voting rights in municipal elections, while only men with a certain income could vote in the parliamentary election. Women still did not have any right to vote. A majority in the Women Voting Rights Association then decided to propose a limited voting right for women: that women should be able to vote in municipal elections at the same conditions as men could vote in national elections. This would give only rich women the right to vote, mainly in the cities.

Qvam belonged to the minority in the Women Voting Rights Association that did not want to compromise about full voting rights as a human right. In 1898, they broke away from the mother association and formed the Countrywide Women Rights Association (Landskvinnestemmerettsforeningen) where Qvam became leader. When women obtained a limited right to vote in municipal elections in 1901, the Countrywide Women Rights Association challenged women to get involved in party work and they recruited candidates to political parties, mainly to the Liberal Party.

In 1902–1903, Qvam lived in Stockholm where Ole Anton Qvam had been appointed Norwegian Prime Minister in Stockholm.

When a referendum on whether Norway should leave the union with Sweden was announced in July 1905 and scheduled to be held 13 August 1905, Qvam appealed to the president of the Norwegian parliament Carl Berner to let women take part in the referendum, but the reply was negative. Only men over 25 that did not depend on welfare were given the right to vote. In August the Countrywide Women Voting Rights Association started to collect signatures of women in support of the dissolution of the union. Elise Welhaven-Gunnerson was the driving force in the beginning, but Qvam became important for the success as she could mobilize women not only through the Countrywide Women Voting Rights Association but also through the larger Norwegian Women's Public Health Association which she also headed. During two weeks in August, about 244,765 signatures from women were gathered. On 22 August 1905, Fredrikke Marie Qvam, Marie Kjølseth and Welhaven-Gunnerson delivered the list with signatures and a letter in support of the dissolution to the Norwegian parliament. More signatures arrived in October and in total about 300,000 signatures from women were gathered in support of a dissolution of the union. Some men without voting rights were among those who had signed. 368,392 men had voted in the referendum 13 August 1905.

The success of gathering female signatures in support of the dissolution of the union earned women respect and was seen by many as a sign that women were politically mature enough to vote. It contributed to a process that led to full voting rights for women in 1913. After this, Qvam and the Countrywide Women Voting Rights Association focused on projects that should stimulate women to use their voting rights and participate in political activities. A motto frequently used by Qvam was "A right to vote is a duty to vote".

Qvam remained leader of the Norwegian Women's Public Health Association until 1933 when she was 90. She received the King's Medal of Merit in gold in 1911 and became Knight, First Class of Order of St. Olav in 1915.

== Death and legacy ==
Qvam died at Gjævran farm in Steinkjer in 1938. She was buried at Egge churchyard together with her husband, Ole Anton Qvam. She was survived by her daughter Louise Qvam, a physician. A statue of her has been erected in Steinkjer. An award in her name, Fredrikkeprisen, is awarded yearly by the Norwegian Women's Public Health Association. Fredrikke Qvams gate, a street in central Oslo, was named after her in 1951.

In connection with the 100th anniversary of universal female suffrage in Norway in 2013, Qvam was voted the second most important woman in Norway in the last hundred years (following Gro Harlem Brundtland).

== Awards ==
- King's Medal of Merit in gold (1911)
- Knight, First Class of Order of St. Olav (1915)

== Literature ==
- Folkvord, Magnhild. 2013. Fredrikke Marie Qvam : rabaldermenneske og strateg, Oslo: Det Norske Samlaget. ISBN 978-82-521-8300-9
