= Anna Rogstad =

Norwegian politician and activist (1854–1938)

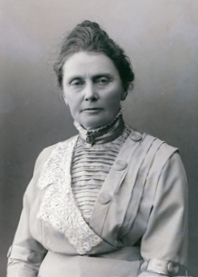
- Anna Rogstad in 1912
- Born: 26 July 1854; Nordre Land, Norway
- Died: 8 November 1938 (aged 84)
- Occupations: Politician, Educator, Suffragist
- Known for: Norway's first female member of Parliament

Anna Georgine Rogstad (26 July 1854 – 8 November 1938) was a Norwegian politician, women's rights activist and educator. A member of the conservative-liberal Liberal Left Party, she was Norway's first female Member of Parliament. A teacher by profession, Rogstad was deeply involved in the educational policies of the nation. She was a prominent leader in the women's rights movement and the campaign for women's right to vote, and was a co-founder and board member of the Norwegian Association for Women's Rights and board member of the Association for Women's Suffrage. In 1911 she met in parliament as a deputy representative for Jens Bratlie, and held this position full-time after Bratlie became Prime Minister in 1912.

== Early life and career ==
Rogstad was born in Nordre Land Municipality to legal clerk Ole Rogstad (1805–1876) and Anne Cathrine Møller (b. 1807). Rogstad started teaching in primary school in 1873 in Trondheim. Four years later she moved to Kristiania – today's Oslo – where she worked at various locations before settling in Grünerløkka, where she stayed for thirty years.

While living in Kristiania, Rogstad became involved in issues of women's education and worked to strengthen the education of girls. In 1889 she became president of the Kristiania female teachers' organization, which she changed from a social club to a trade union. Initially she advocated the creation of a separate teaching academy for women, but during the 1880s she changed her position to favour admitting women to the all-male teaching academy, which became policy in 1890. She was also active in the Norwegian Teachers' Union, where she served as vice president in the period from 1892 to 1907. When the Norwegian Association of Female Teachers was created in 1912, Rogstad was the president until 1919. In 1899 she started a secondary school for girls, with voluntary evening classes for twenty-five students. The school became popular, and in 1909 the city took over. Rogstad remained the school's principal until she retired in 1923, at the age of sixty-nine.

Anna Rogstad was among the founders of the Norwegian Association for Women's Rights in 1884 and the Association for Women's Suffrage in 1885. She was a board member of the Norwegian Association for Women's Rights 1886–1888 and vice president of the Association for Women's Suffrage during 1885–1897 and 1902–1913. In Kristiania she represented the female teachers in the municipal school board from 1894 to 1916. She was elected deputy representative of the Association for Women's Suffrage to the city council in 1901, representative of the city council of a group of three center-right parties in 1907 and deputy representative to the city council for the Liberal Left Party in 1910.

== Parliamentary career ==
Rogstad was a member of the Liberal Left Party of Norway. An electoral reform in 1907 gave voting rights to women who could show a certain level of economic affluence. Even though universal suffrage was not introduced until 1913, this reform also allowed women to be elected for political office. In 1911 Rogstad became the first woman in Norwegian history to sit in Parliament (Stortinget), as a deputy representative of Jens Bratlie. The event was met with great public attention, and people who could not fit into the viewing galleries gathered outside the Parliament building. The President of the assembly, Johan Magnus Halvorsen, said in a special address that, even though there had been much debate over the reforms, he was convinced that the outcome would be favourable for the nation. Rogstad held her first speech on the floor of the Parliament after only five days, when she argued for a cut in the defence budget, because she believed that all conflicts should be solved by arbitration. She also got involved in debates over gender equality, education, culture and temperance. When Bratlie became Prime Minister in 1912, Rogstad held his seat full-time for a year.

Rogstad was also an author, and wrote fifteen textbooks for the Norwegian school. The best known was her 1893 ABC for skole og hjem (ABC for School and Home). She wrote numerous articles in newspapers and magazines, mostly on the issue of educational policies. As a public speaker she was described as dry, and not particularly engaging, but she nevertheless kept her audience's attention with her matter-of-factly, well-reasoned arguments. Rogstad died in 1938; she was never married.

== Select publications ==
- Modersmaals-undervisningen i smaaskolen (1890)
- Ledetraad for katekismusundervisningen i de to første aar (1891)
- ABC for skole og hjem (with E. Holst) (1893)
- De syv skoleaar. Praktisk veiledning for norskundervisningen (1895)
