= Bonnevie =

Bonnevie is a surname. Notable people with the surname include:

- Andreas Bonnevie (1782–1833), Norwegian priest and politician
- Carl Bonnevie (1881–1972), Norwegian jurist and peace activist
- Carl Siegfried Bonnevie (1804–1856), Norwegian naval officer
- Dina Bonnevie (born 1961), Filipino-Swiss actress
- Honoratus Bonnevie (physician) (1726–1811), Norwegian physician
- Honoratus Bonnevie (politician) (1797–1848), Norwegian politician
- Lou Bonnevie (born 1965), Filipino musician
- Margarete Bonnevie (1884–1970), Norwegian author, feminist and politician
- Maria Bonnevie (born 1973), Swedish-Norwegian actress
