= Svendsen =

Svendsen is a Danish and Norwegian surname. It was originally a patronymic which means "son of Svend".

Notable people with the surname include:

- Anna Svendsen (born 1990), Norwegian cross-country skier
- Arne Svendsen (1884–1958), Norwegian songwriter, actor and revue writer
- Arne Svendsen (footballer) (1909–1983), Norwegian footballer
- Arnljot Ole Strømme Svendsen (1921–2022), Norwegian economist
- Asger Svendsen (contemporary), Danish musician and music professor
- Axel Svendsen (1912–1995), Danish canoeist
- Berit Svendsen (born 1963), Norwegian engineer and business executive
- Birgit Aagard-Svendsen (born 1956), Danish business executive
- Birgitte Victoria Svendsen (born 1957), Norwegian actress
- Bjørn Svendsen (c. 1062–1100), illegitimate son of King Sweyn II of Denmark
- Brandon Svendsen (born 1985), American professional ice hockey player
- Bud Svendsen (1915–1996), American professional football player
- Christian Meaas Svendsen (born 1988), Norwegian jazz bassist
- Christian Valdemar Svendsen (1890–1959), Danish Olympic gymnast
- Conrad Bonnevie-Svendsen (1898–1983), Norwegian government minister and priest
- Conrad Svendsen (1862–1943), Norwegian priest and teacher for the deaf
- Conrad Vogt-Svendsen (1914–1973), Norwegian priest
- Elga Olga Svendsen (1906–1992), Danish film actress
- Elisabeth Svendsen (1930–2011), British animal welfare advocate and hotelier
- Elvi Svendsen (1920–2013), Danish swimmer
- Emil Hegle Svendsen (born 1985), Norwegian biathlete
- Eyvind Johan-Svendsen (1896–1946), Danish stage and film actor
- Flemming Kofod-Svendsen (born 1944), Danish minister in the Lutheran Church of Denmark
- Georg Svendsen (1894–1966), Norwegian journalist and crime novelist
- George Svendsen (1913–1995), American professional football and basketball player
- Gunnar Svendsen (1915–1984), Norwegian sport shooter
- Hanne Marie Svendsen (born 1933), Danish writer and broadcasting executive
- Harry Svendsen (1895–1960), Norwegian swimmer
- Hartvig Svendsen (1902–1971), Norwegian politician
- Ivar Svendsen (1929–2015), Norwegian actor
- Jan Svendsen (born 1948), American shot putter
- Joachim Svendsen (born 1994), Norwegian ice hockey goaltender
- Johan Svendsen (1840–1911), Norwegian composer, conductor and violinist
- Johanne Svendsen (born 2004), Danish tennis player
- Jon Svendsen (1953–2024), American water polo player and swimmer
- Julius Svendsen (1919–1971), Norwegian-born American animator and comic book illustrator
- Kari Svendsen (born 1950), Norwegian singer, banjo player and revue artist
- Kenneth Svendsen (born 1954), Norwegian politician
- Kester Svendsen (1912–1968), American educator, author, chess administrator
- Kim Svendsen (born 1955), Danish cyclist
- Kjell Arild Svendsen (born 1953), Norwegian politician
- Lars Svendsen (born 1970), Norwegian philosopher
- LeRoy W. Svendsen Jr. (1928–2022), major general in the United States Air Force
- Linda Svendsen (born 1954), Canadian screenwriter and author of Norwegian heritage
- Louise Averill Svendsen (1915–1994), American art historian
- Markus Svendsen (born 1941), Norwegian skier
- Nicklas Svendsen (born 1986), Danish football player
- Olav Svendsen (1899–1984), Norwegian lawyer and judge
- Ole Svendsen (born 1952), Danish boxer
- Olga Svendsen (1883–1942), Danish stage and film actress
- Oskar Svendsen (born 1994), Norwegian cyclist
- Paulus Svendsen (1904–1989), Norwegian literary historian
- Per Johan Svendsen (born 1953), Danish painter
- Poul Svendsen (1927–2024), Danish rower
- Rolf Aagaard-Svendsen (born 1948), Danish politician
- Ruth Svendsen (1915–1998), Norwegian trade unionist and politician
- Sander Svendsen (born 1997), Norwegian footballer
- Sara Svendsen (born 1980), Norwegian cross-country skier
- Signe Svendsen (born 1974), Danish singer
- Sigvald Svendsen (1895–1956), Norwegian politician
- Svend Rasmussen Svendsen (1864–1945), Norwegian American impressionist artist
- Therese Svendsen (born 1989), Swedish swimmer
- Thorleif Svendsen (1910–1975), Norwegian footballer
- Torbjørn Svendsen (born 1954), Norwegian footballer
- Torgeir Svendsen (1910–1981), Norwegian politician
- Truls Svendsen (born 1972), Norwegian television presenter and comedian
- Victor Svendsen (born 1995), Danish badminton player
- Zoë Svendsen, British academic and director

== See also ==
- Svendsen Peninsula, Ellesmere Island, Nunavut, Canada
