= Honoratus Bonnevie (politician) =

Norwegian politician (1797–1848)

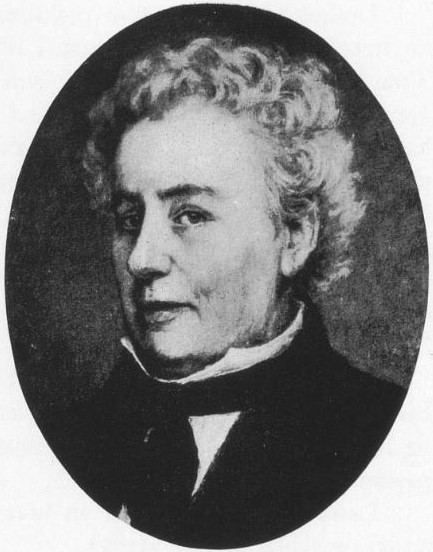
Honoratus Bonnevie

Honoratus Bonnevie (15 June 1797 – 27 March 1848) was a Norwegian politician.

== Life ==
He was the son of district stipendiary magistrate Niels Cornelius Bonnevie (1756–1836). His great-grandfather had migrated to Norway from Antibes, France, and he was a grandson of Honoratus Bonnevie and a nephew of Andreas Bonnevie.

He was elected to the Norwegian Parliament in 1845 and 1848, representing the urban constituency of Throndhjem og Levanger. He served as burgomaster there. He died in the same year as his last election.

== Family ==
He married Sophie Augusta Baumann (1804–1895) in 1826 in Kongsberg. She was a daughter of August Christian Baumann and Margrethe Sophie Stockfleth, granddaughter of Thomas Rosing de Stockfleth, niece of Samuel William Manthey and a first cousin of August Christian Manthey. Honoratus Bonnevie and his wife Sophie had the daughter Johanne Mathilde Dietrichson and the son Jacob Aall Bonnevie, a politician. Through the former he was a father-in-law of art historian Lorentz Dietrichson, and through the latter he was the grandfather of professor Kristine Bonnevie, judge Thomas Bonnevie and politician Carl Emil Christian Bonnevie. Through another daughter Christine Augusta, he was the father-in-law of Lorentz Henrik Müller Segelcke.
