= Honoratus Bonnevie =

Honoratus Bonnevie may refer to:

- Honoratus Bonnevie (physician)
- Honoratus Bonnevie (politician)
