= Johanne Mathilde Dietrichson =

Norwegian painter (1837–1921)

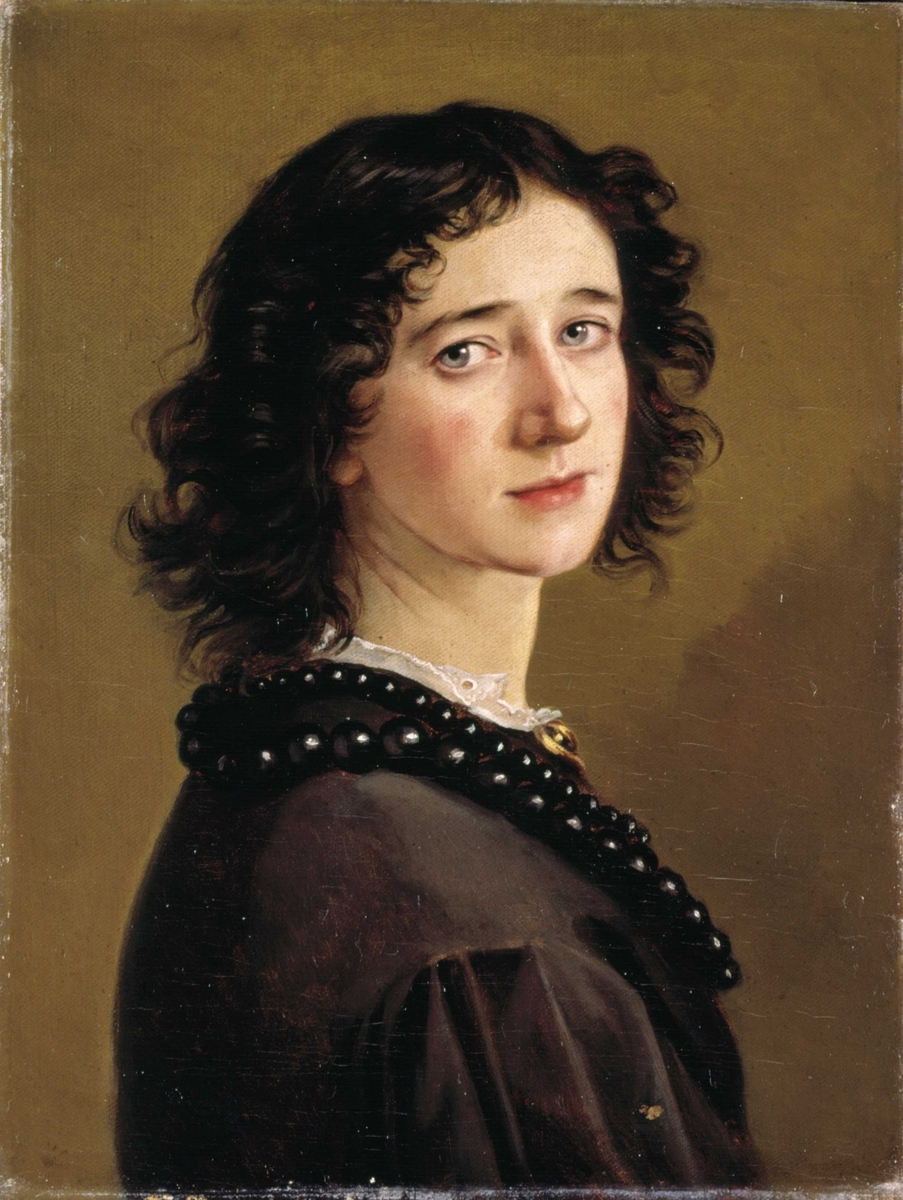
- Self portrait, 1865.
- Born: Johanne Mathilde Bonnevie; July 12, 1837; Christiana, Norway
- Died: November 28, 1921 (aged 84); Christiana, Norway
- Education: Royal Academy of Painting and Sculpture
- Spouse: Lorentz Dietrichson (m. 1862; died 1917)
- Relatives: Honoratus Bonnevie (father); Jacob Aall Bonnevie (brother)

Johanne Mathilde Dietrichson (née Bonnevie; July 12, 1837 - November 28, 1921) was a Norwegian painter who also made sculptures and ceramics. She was the first Norwegian woman to receive a formal art education.

Born in Christiana (now Oslo), Dietrichson grew up in Trondheim and Kongsberg. She took a drawing class in Christiana, then on the advice of Camilla Collett and Adolph Tidemand she traveled to Düsseldorf to continue her education in 1857. There she worked in the studio of Otto Mengelberg until 1861. The following year, Dietrichson married the art historian Lorentz Dietrichson. She accompanied him on his travels, living in Rome until 1865, in Stockholm from 1866-76, where she attended the Royal Academy of Painting and Sculpture, and in Christiana after 1876. In the 1870s and 1880s, Dietrichson often exhibited in the Art Association and Høstutstillingen, the annual fall exhibit in Christiana.

Johanne Dietrichson was the daughter of Honoratus Bonnevie and sister of Jacob Aall Bonnevie.
