= Kunstindustrimuseet =

Kunstindustrimuseet is the native name of:

- Danish Museum of Art & Design
- Norwegian Museum of Decorative Arts and Design
