= Hans Jacob Nørregaard =

Norwegian colonel

Hans Jacob Nørregaard (born 13 June 1832 in Christiania, died 30 March 1900) was a Norwegian colonel, aide-de-camp to king Charles and chairman of the Christiania Military Society.

He studied at the Norwegian Military Academy and the Norwegian Military College, and became a second lieutenant in 1851, a first lieutenant in 1854, a staff captain in 1867, a captain in 1875, and in 1888 a lieutenant colonel and head of Trænkorpset (literally “the Train Corps” or “Transport Corps”), a logistical and transport branch of the army. He held the court title kammerjunker at the Royal Court and served as aide-de-camp to king Charles from 1866. He was a member of the Royal Swedish Academy of War Sciences and has published several articles on military affairs. He was also a member of several governmental committees.

He was a son of captain of the artillery and deputy stable master at the Royal Court Paul Ludvig Rudolf Nørregaard (1804–34) and Sarine Pauline Bølling (1808–1899). After his father died 30 years old, his mother remarried to the physician and Surgeon General Jens Johan Hjort (1798–1873).

Hans Jacob Nørregaard was married to Elisabeth Sophie Dorothea Henriette Wegner (born 12 August 1839), daughter of the industrialist Benjamin Wegner. His mother-in-law's family owned Berenberg Bank. They were the parents of the noted war correspondent Benjamin Wegner Nørregaard (1861–1935), the wine merchant and consul in Tarragona Ludvig Paul Rudolf Nørregaard (1863–1928) and the barrister and president of the Norwegian Bar Association Harald Nørregaard (1864–1938), who founded the law firm today known as Hjort.

== Honours ==
- Knight First Class of the Order of St. Olav (1881)
- Order of St. Vladimir (1865)
- Knight of the Order of the Dannebrog
- Knight of the Legion of Honour
- Fourth Class of the Order of the Medjidie
