= Carl Siegfried Bonnevie =

Norwegian naval officer (1804–1856)

Carl Siegfried Bonnevie (19 December 1804 – 13 October 1856) was a Norwegian naval officer.

He was born on Falkensten farm near Horten as the son of Tørris Bonnevie and Sophie Amalie Schlegel. He was a grandson of Honoratus Bonnevie, and his great-grandfather had migrated to Norway from Antibes, France around 1700. He was also a nephew of Andreas Bonnevie and first cousin of politician Honoratus Bonnevie.

He took his naval education at Frederiksvern, and became an officer in 1821. In the Royal Norwegian Navy he was promoted to Premier Lieutenant in 1832, Lieutenant Captain in 1945 and Captain in 1856, though he spent the years 1841 to 1849 in Bengal. He was a notable debater within the circle of higher officers, founding and editing the magazine Magazin for Søvæsen. He died in October 1856 in Horten when a cannon exploded.
