= Conrad Svendsen =

Norwegian teacher for the deaf

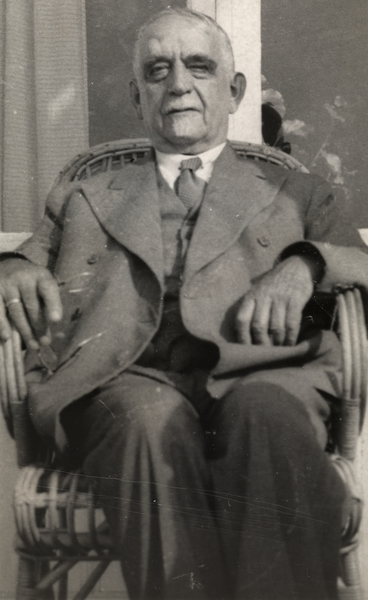
- Conrad Svendsen.
- Born: 19 August 1862; Bergen, Norway
- Died: 9 September 1943 (aged 81); Nordstrand, Norway
- Occupations: Pastor; Teacher for the deaf Magazine editor
- Known for: Pioneer for the deaf.
- Children: Conrad Bonnevie-Svendsen
- Relatives: Jacob Aall Bonnevie (father-in-law); Conrad Vogt-Svendsen (grandson); Vilhelm Bjerknes (brother-in-law); Alfred Jørgen Bryn (brother-in-law); Kristine Bonnevie (sister-in-law); Margarete Bonnevie (sister-in-law)

Conrad Svendsen (19 August 1862 – 9 September 1943) was a Norwegian teacher for the deaf, pastor and magazine editor.

== Personal life ==
Svendsen was born in Bergen to Johan Henrik Parrau Svendsen and Margrethe Louise Vogt. He was a son-in-law of politician Jacob Aall Bonnevie, the father of Conrad Bonnevie-Svendsen, and grandfather of Conrad Vogt-Svendsen. He was a brother-in-law of physicist and meteorologist Vilhelm Bjerknes, patent engineer Alfred Jørgen Bryn, biologist Kristine Bonnevie and feminist Margarete Bonnevie.

== Career ==
While a theological student, Svendsen started working as a teacher for the deaf in Christiania. He eventually travelled to Denmark, Switzerland, Italy, France and Germany to make further studies on the education of deaf. In 1895 he was ordained pastor for the deaf in Norway. In 1898 he founded the institution Hjemmet for Døve, a home for the deaf in Nordstrand, and he edited the magazine De Døves Blad. His publications include Om Døvstummes Undervisning from 1889, De døvstumme, deres Opdragelse i Hjem og Skole from 1893, and Husandagtsbog, ordnet efter kirkeaaret from 1901. A relief of Svendsen, sculptured by Nic Schiøll, is located at Hjemmet for Døve.
