= Enteroxenos oestergreni =

Scientific classification
- Kingdom: Animalia
- Phylum: Mollusca
- Class: Gastropoda
- Subclass: Caenogastropoda
- Order: Littorinimorpha
- Family: Eulimidae
- Genus: Enteroxenos
- Species: E. oestergreni

Binomial name
- Enteroxenos oestergreni Bonnevie, 1902

Synonyms
- Enteroxenos ostergreni Bonnevie, 1902

Species of gastropod

Enteroxenos oestergreni is a species of minute sea snail, a marine gastropod mollusk in the family Eulimidae. The species is notable for being commonly misspelt as Enteroxenos ostergreni in previous documentations,. These misspellings have been corrected by Bonnevie shortly after the species was taxonomised.

== Distribution ==
This marine species occurs in the following locations:

- European waters (ERMS scope)
- United Kingdom Exclusive Economic Zone
