= Thomas Bonnevie =

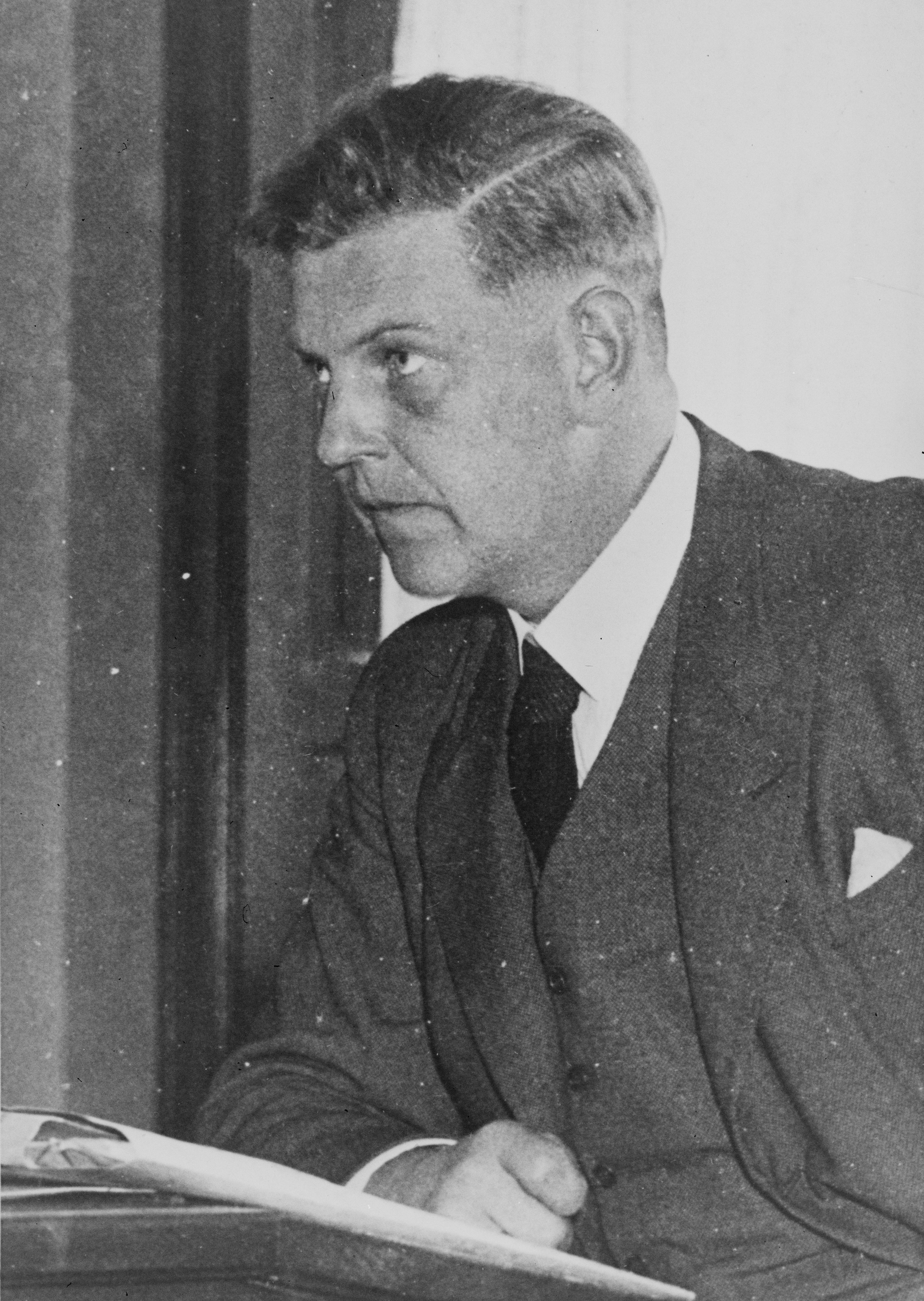
Thomas Bonnevie

Thomas Bonnevie (12 September 1879 – 19 May 1960) was a Norwegian Supreme Court justice.

== Biography ==
Bonnevie was born at Trondheim, Norway. He was a son of Member of Parliament and cabinet minister Jacob Aall Bonnevie (1838–1904) and Anne Johanne Daae (1839–1876). He was also the brother of professor Kristine Bonnevie (1872–1948) and jurist Carl Bonnevie (1881-1972). His sister Sofie Honoria Bonnevie (1864–1928), married Norwegian physicist and meteorologist Vilhelm Bjerknes. Bonnevie was married to Margarete Bonnevie, who was President of the Norwegian Association for Women's Rights; he was also himself a member of the association.

Thomas Bonnevie earned the cand.jur. degree in 1902 at the Royal Frederick University, and became a barrister (with the right to appear before the Supreme Court) in 1910. He was a partner with Harald Nørregaard (1864-1938) in the law firm Nørregaard & Bonnevie until his appointment as Supreme Court justice to the Supreme Court of Norway in 1922. Thomas Bonnevie also promoted Gustav Vigeland's art and the construction of the sculpture arrangement in Frogner Park.

In 1947, Bonnevie published the book Høyesterett og riksråds-forhandlingene (Oslo: Dahl, Mathisen, 1947).
