= Harald Nørregaard =

Norwegian lawyer

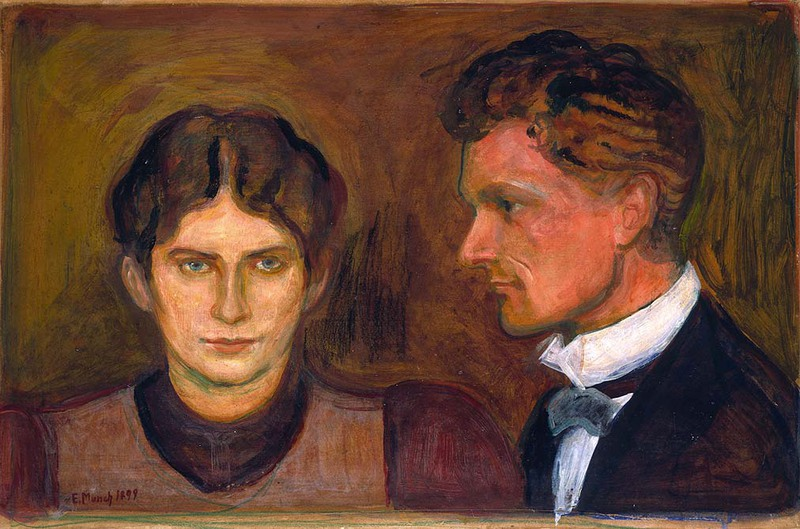
Harald Nørregaard and his wife Aase painted by Edvard Munch (1899). The painting is owned by the National Gallery

Harald Nørregaard (30 May 1864 in Vestre Aker – 5 April 1938) was a Norwegian supreme court advocate (høyesterettsadvokat), i.e. a lawyer with the right to appear before the Supreme Court of Norway. He founded the law firm now known as Advokatfirmaet Hjort in 1893 in Christiania, and was Chairman of the Norwegian Bar Association from 1904 to 1907. He was also one of Edvard Munch's closest friends since adolescence, adviser and lawyer. He owned several of Munch's most famous paintings. He was married to Aase Nørregaard née Carlsen (1869–1908), a painter and a close friend of Munch, and secondly to Marit Liv Nørregaard née Tillier (1885–1981), who was also a painter. Munch made several paintings and drawings portraying Nørregaard and his two wives.

According to Ivo de Figueiredo, Nørregaard was "known for his eloquence in court. It was said of him that he dominated the courtroom with his very presence, and his warm voice settled around the Supreme Court as velvet". After some years, Thomas Bonnevie joined his law firm, which was subsequently known as ''Nørregaard & Bonnevie'', but Bonnevie was appointed a supreme court justice in 1922. In 1932 the young lawyer Johan Bernhard Hjort joined Nørregaard's law firm. Harald Nørregaard died six years later in 1938, and after World War II the firm was continued by Hjort and renamed Advokatfirmaet Hjort.

Harald Nørregaard was the son of colonel and former aide-de-camp to king Charles Hans Jacob Nørregaard (1832–1900) and Sophie Wegner (1838–1906), a daughter of industrialist Benjamin Wegner and Henriette Seyler of the Hamburg Berenberg–Gossler–Seyler banking dynasty (whose family owned Berenberg Bank). His brothers were the noted war correspondent Benjamin Wegner Nørregaard, wine merchant and consul in Tarragona Ludvig Paul Rudolf Nørregaard and Johan Hjort Nørregaard.

== Gallery ==
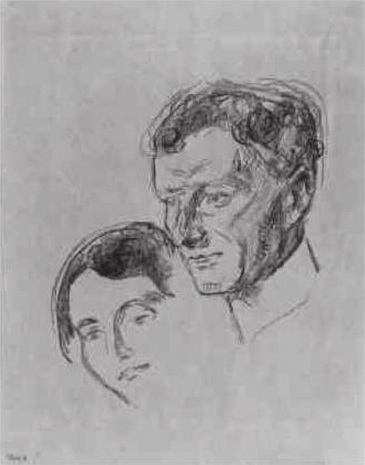
The lithograph Marit and Harald Nørregaard by Edvard Munch, ca. 1914

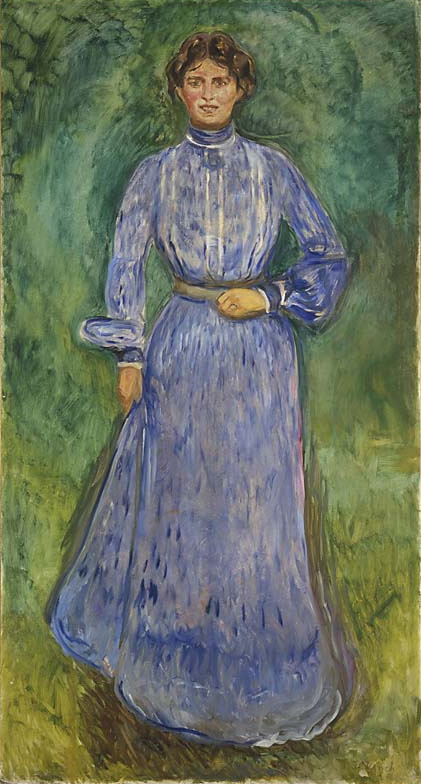
Harald Nørregaard's first wife Aase, painted by Edvard Munch

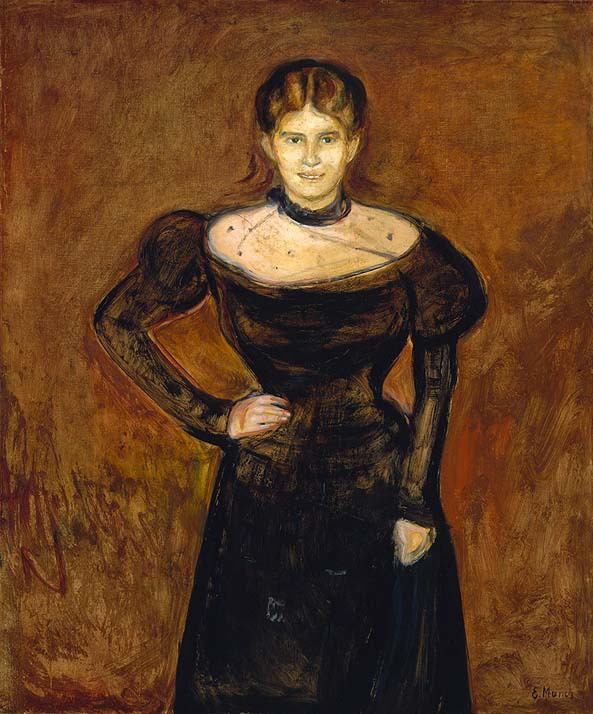
Harald Nørregaard's first wife Aase, painted by Edvard Munch

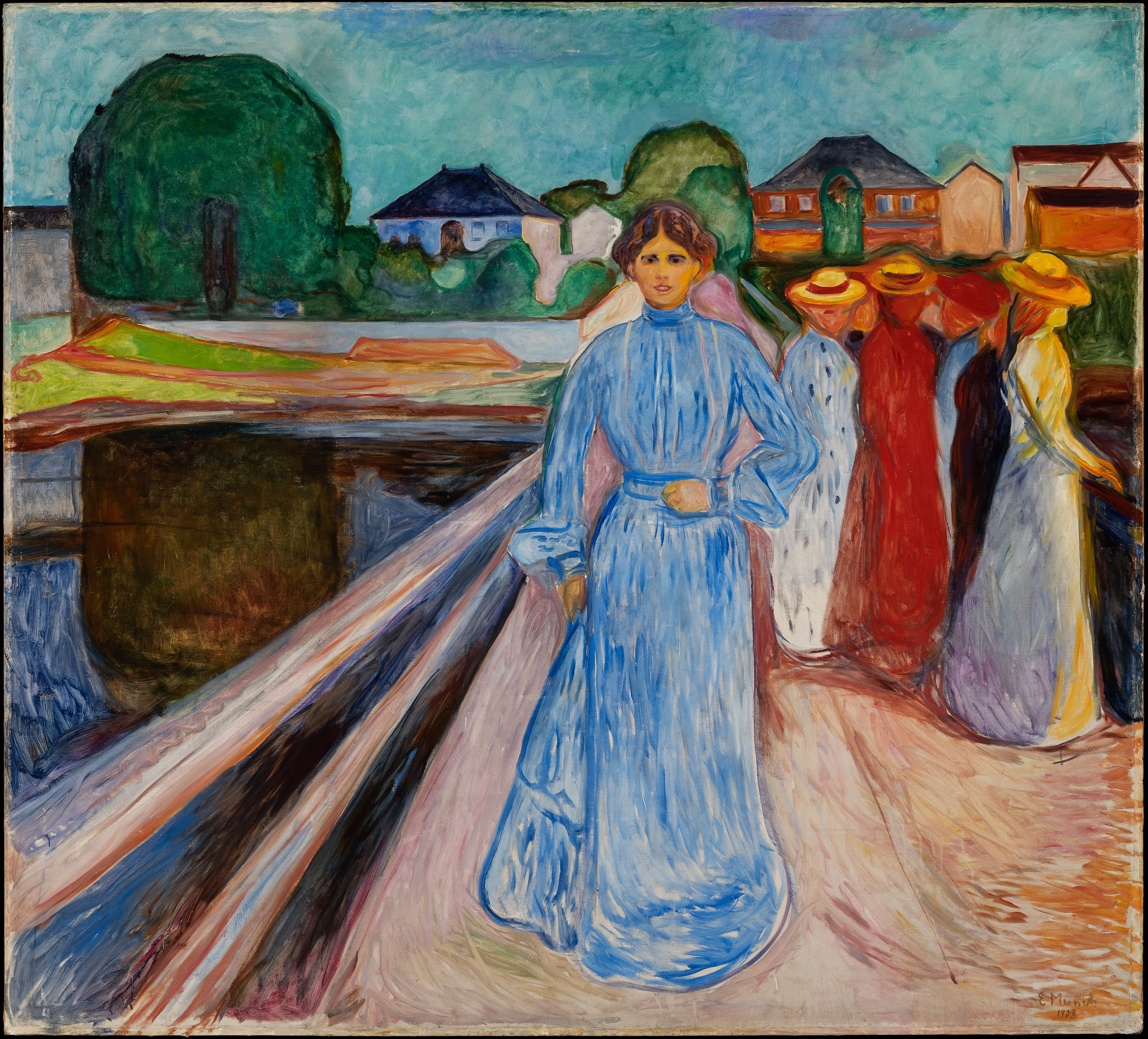
The Women on the Bridge by Edvard Munch, 1902. This painting also depicts Aase in her blue dress
