= Enteroxenos muelleri =

Scientific classification
- Kingdom: Animalia
- Phylum: Mollusca
- Class: Gastropoda
- Subclass: Caenogastropoda
- Order: Littorinimorpha
- Family: Eulimidae
- Genus: Enteroxenos
- Species: E. muelleri

Binomial name
- Enteroxenos muelleri Semper, 1868

Synonyms
- Entoconcha muelleri Semper, 1868

Species of gastropod

Enteroxenos muelleri is a species of small sea snail, a marine gastropod mollusk in the family Eulimidae.
