= Norwegian Church Aid =

Norwegian humanitarian organisation

- NCA
- Kirkens Nødhjelp
- Formation: Established 1947
- Headquarters: Oslo
- Fields: Humanitarian aid
- Secretary General: Dagfinn Høybråten
- Website: https://www.kirkensnodhjelp.no/

Norwegian Church Aid (NCA; Norwegian: Kirkens Nødhjelp) is an independent Norwegian humanitarian and ecumenical organization with headquarters in Oslo. It was traditionally affiliated with the state Church of Norway, but has over time developed into an independent organization. The organization is mandated by Norwegian churches to fight for a more just world in cooperation with people and organizations across the world to eradicate poverty and injustice.

The long-term goals of NCA is to save lives, seek justice and build resilience by working with advocacy, long-term development and humanitarian responses. Humanitarian aid to developing nations has, since NCA's inception, been the most central aspect of the organization's work. The concept of Christian compassion has been a motivating force of the organization.

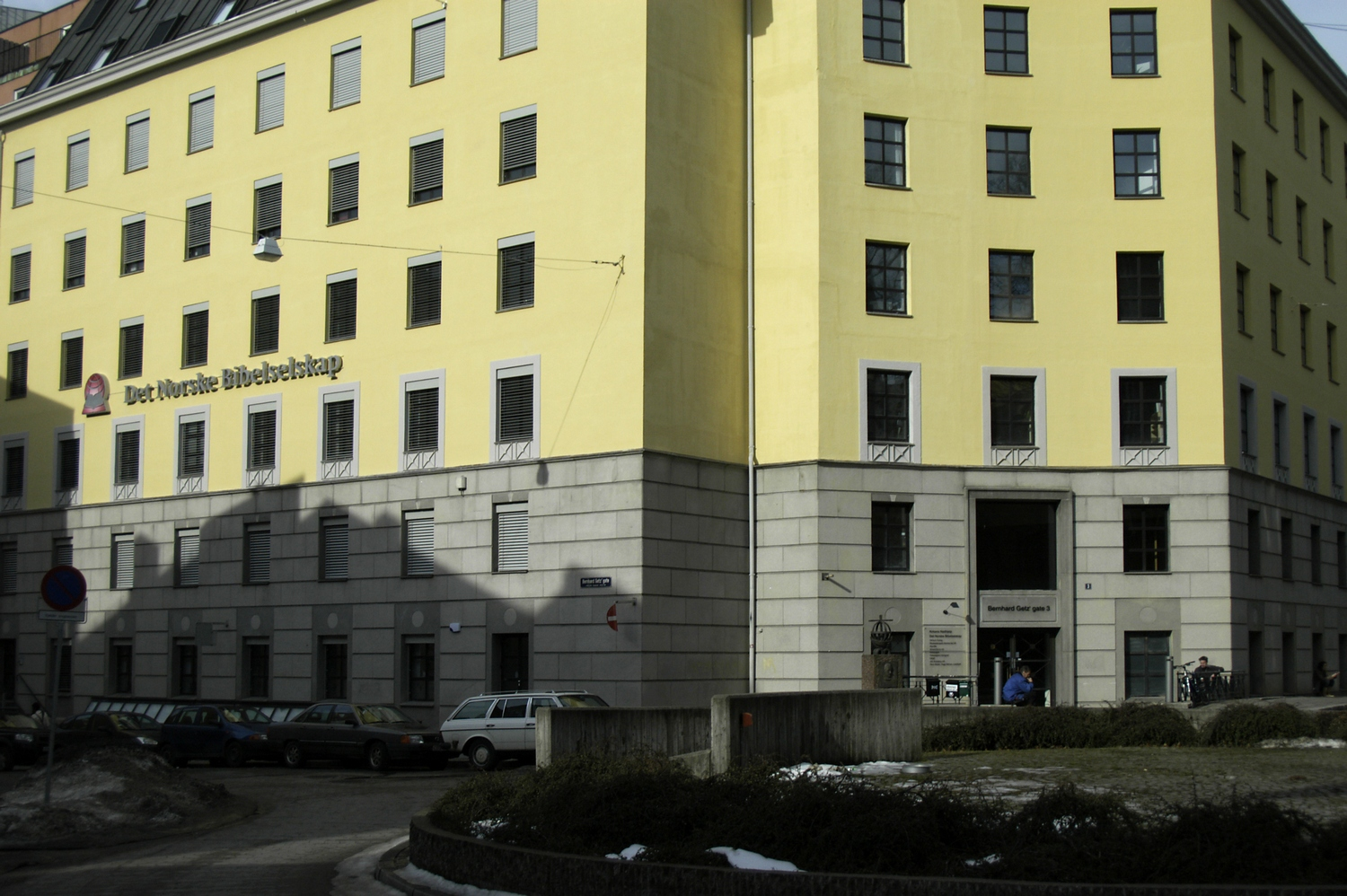
NCA's head office is located in Bernhard Getz Gate 3, in Oslo.

The precursor to NCA was founded in October 1945, and was called the National Association of Congregational Aid (Menighetspleienes Landsforbund). The goal was to coordinate the joint social aid program of the Norwegian Church after the Second World War. Today, the organization works in over 30 countries in Africa, Asia, Europe and Central and Latin America. In 2018 the Norwegian Church Aid and five other key NGOs organized the customary torchlight parade in Oslo in honor of that year's Nobel Peace Prize laureates, Denis Mukwege and Nadia Murad, who were awarded the prize for their work to end the use of sexual violence as a weapon of war.

== History ==
=== 1940–1960: Early beginnings ===
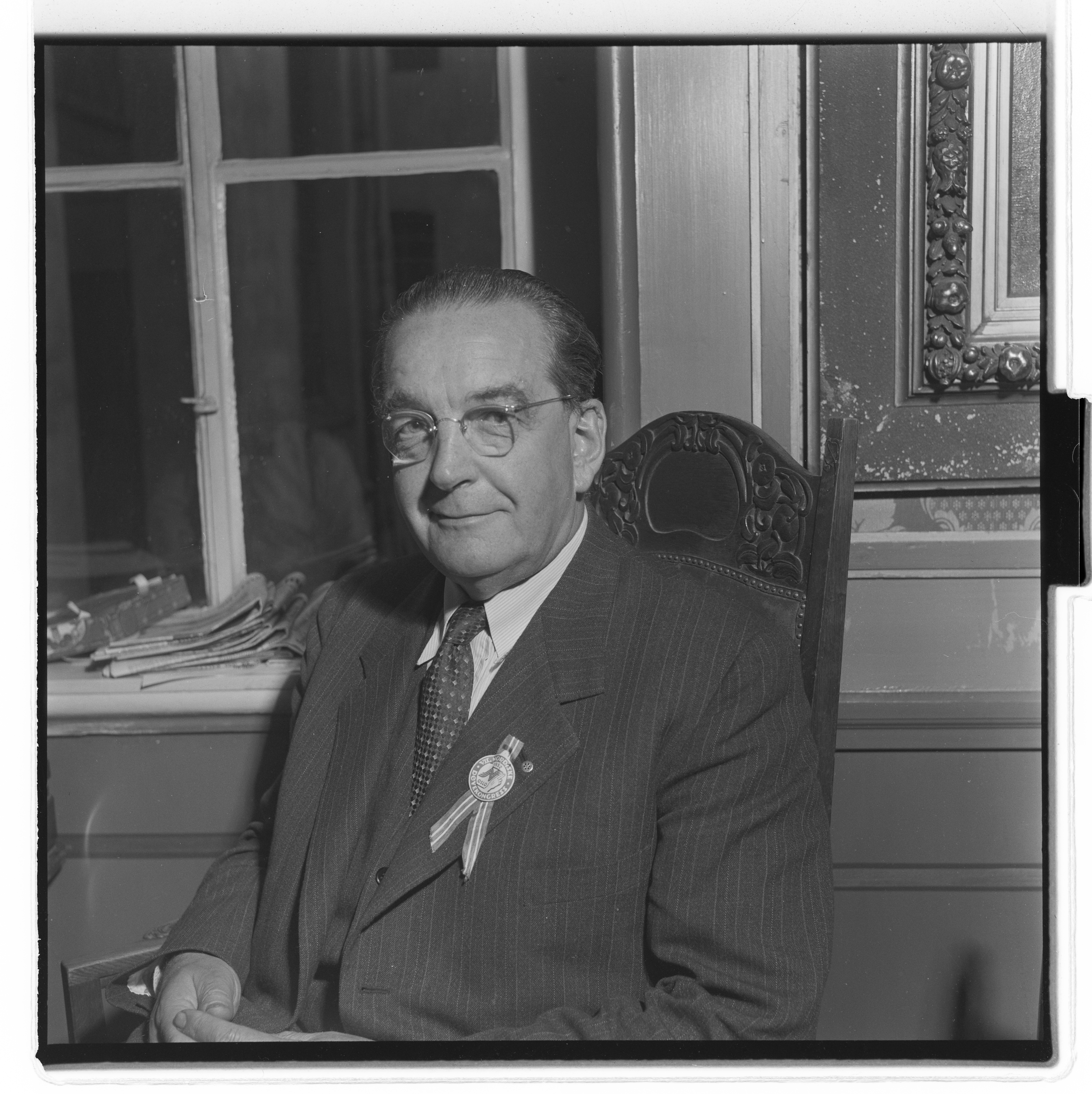
Among others, pastor Conrad Bonnevie-Svendsen initiated The National Association of Congregational Aid. The precursor to NCA.

In October 1945, the National Association of Congregational Aid (Menighetspleienes Landsforbund) was founded by priest Conrad Bonnevie-Svendsen and dean Henrik Hauge. The Association was founded to coordinate the joint social aid program of the Norwegian Church after the Second World War. This initiative marked the humble beginnings of the Norwegian Church Aid.

In the aftermath of World War II, many organizations wanted to help in the struggle to rebuild Europe. In Norway, the organization Europahjelpen, initially founded by the Red Cross and Norwegian People's Aid functioned as an umbrella for organizations committed to contribute in the refugee aid in Europe. The members of the National Association of Congregational Aid argued that the aid initiated by Europahjelpen was not reaching everyone in need, and that food relief was being sent first and foremost to former allies in France, the Netherlands, Belgium and Greece.

The Association saw that the need for an aid program was perhaps even greater in a Germany decimated by war. In October 1947the Association decided to initiate a campaign in Germany to aid people impoverished from the war. Over time, it was also decided that Norwegian churches would continue to deliver aid to refugees in Central Europe and the Middle East.The campaign was carried out in cooperation with the Lutheran World Federation and the World Council of Churches, and was named Norwegian Church Aid.

At a meeting in 1953 the Association formed Norwegian Church Aid as an independent organization with its own statuettes. The humanitarian aid work of NCA was furthermore expanded to include refugees in Hong Kong, those affected by war in Congo, and survivors from natural disasters in both Algeria and India.

=== 1960s: Breakthrough ===
In its first decade of operation NCA focused primarily on providing disaster relief in the countries they operated. However, based on the argument that large parts of the world's population lived in permanent need, NCA began its first long-term development project in 1962, in Abakaliki in Eastern Nigeria. After settling in Nigeria, the real breakthrough of NCA establishing itself as a humanitarian organization came in 1966, when an aid campaign was set up in the Biafra-region of Nigeria. The aid program was established in the gradual prelude to the Nigerian Civil War.

Being a break-away region in Nigeria at the time, Biafra was not recognized as a sovereign state by the UN. Because of this, many traditional humanitarian organizations connected to the UN and the Red Cross had to remain passive in the region. Therefore, NCA joined a Nordic cooperation program in the region focused on hunger relief, which established NCA as one of Norway's most important humanitarian organizations. The public attention to the sufferings in Biafra became the visualization of the many sufferings on the African continent, and the aid campaign became the largest from Europe since the Second World War.

=== 1970s and 1980s: Further growth ===
A few years later the NCA initiated their work in South Sudan. Norwegian experts on fields like farming, education and health were brought in to help the infrastructure development in the region. Additionally, construction projects of roads and water supplies were initiated. The program would become the largest development aid project in Norwegian history.

The following years saw the implementation of aid projects by the NCA in both Asia and Latin America. In Bangladesh, a project was initiated in 1971, following the outbreak of the Bangladesh War of Independence. Additionally, humanitarian aid was extended to Guatemala after the 1976 Guatemala earthquake, which killed more than 20.000 and left roughly 1.2 million people homeless.

After establishing a strong presence in South-Sudan in 1972, through a regional development project, several larger developing projects was initiated during the 1980s in Ethiopia, Mali and Eritrea. The gradual increase of European aid to African countries may also be seen in context with the wave of former African colonies gaining independence. This wave also highlighted the needs of these new nations.

The increase in both NCA and other development programs was also related to the gradual digitalization and the creation of mass media. Through more accessible information to the public, more commitment and donations to different causes was generated. During this period, a public Norwegian funding program was established through The Norwegian Agency for Development Cooperation (Norad) and the Norwegian Ministry of Foreign Affairs.

=== 1990s: Cooperation strategies ===
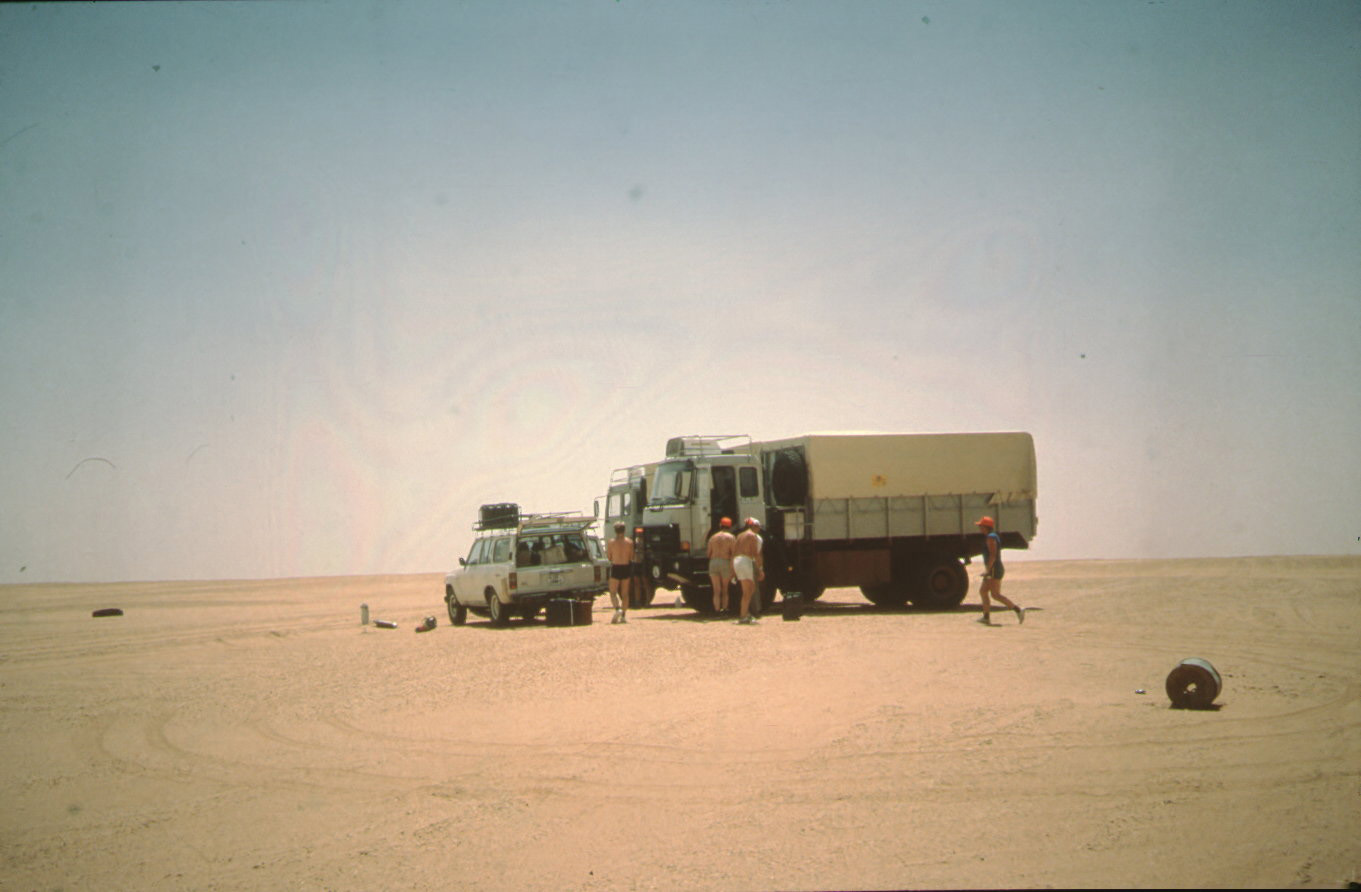
NCA aid trucks close to Dias, Mali. 1992.

With the dissolution of Yugoslavia in 1992 and the following conflicts in the Balkans, NCA once again returned its focus to aid European countries, sending water supplies and sanitary equipment to refugees in neighboring North Macedonia. With many escalating conflicts also marking the 1990s, peacebuilding and humanitarian projects was once again initiated in several countries in Africa and the Middle East.

During these new initiated projects, the NCA also evolved in its understanding of development and aid. It was argued that Norwegian expertise was not always best suited to tackle local problems. Therefore, a focus on local experience and knowledge was implemented in the NCA's strategy to better suit development in a local context. Therefore, the NCA gradually evolved into being a network and partner based organization. In practice, this involved a downscaling of direct commitment from the NCA, and a larger focus on cooperation between partner organizations on a regional, national and international level.

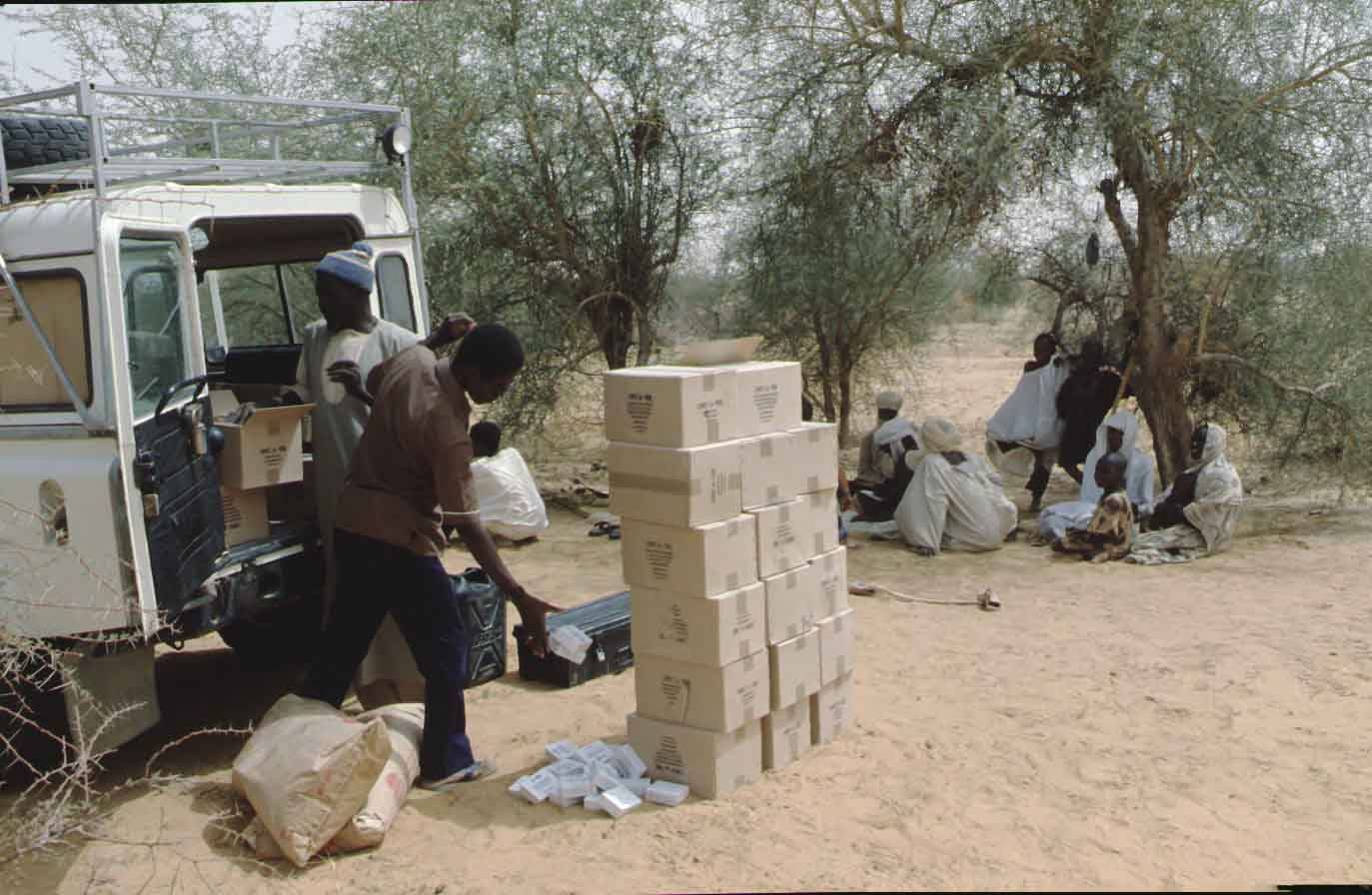
Food distribution in Mali. NCA-staff loading boxes off a truck in 1992.

In 1995, the NCA joined the international alliance Action by Churches Together (ACT). The ACT alliance of churches is a merger of the World Council of Churches, the Lutheran World Federation as well as NCA's partner churches around the world. The network formed the basis for the ACT Alliance, which was founded in 2010.

=== 2000s: Debt release and Changemaker ===
In a framework document from 1998, it was decided that NCA should among other principles influence attitudes and decision-making. One instrument in achieving this effort, was the creation of NCA's youth organization Changemaker in 1992. Since its inception, Changemaker has organized campaigns, courses, camps and local projects for its many thousands of members. In 2003, Changemaker was ranked as the 5th most influential youth organization in Norway, with over 2500 members and 25 regional chapters.

During the early 2000s a larger focus was given to the issue of debt release. An issue Changemaker took a role in discussing, both in Norwegian and international discourse. Through the efforts and activism of both NCA and Changemaker, the Norwegian government cancelled remaining debts of Ecuador, Egypt, Jamaica, Sierra Leone, and Peru in 2006.

=== 2010s and 2020s ===
During the 2010s NCA established activity with partners in numerous countries in the Middle East and Africa. In 2012, NCA launched a humanitarian response program in Syria, after the outbreak of the Syrian civil war. Additionally, a program was set up in Lebanon with the focus of aiding Syrian refugees. In 2014, a program related to water and sanitary aid, climate economic efficiency as well as gender-based violence (GBV) was launched in areas of Iraq affected by conflict. The initial goal was to gradually transition the program into a more focused on humanitarian response and recovery for the region in 2020. Since 2017, NCA also resumed its operations in Nigeria, delivering humanitarian assistance in the conflict-affected north-east region of the country. Also here, there is a strong focus of national partner cooperation to strengthen civil society.

After the Russian invasion of Ukraine, NCA and their partners also established a humanitarian aid program in several places in Ukraine and targeted places in Moldova. The aid is focused on protection and basic services to vulnerable civilian people in the country with a main focus on mental health support, water and sanitation, and support to people exposed to gender based violence.

== List of secretary generals ==
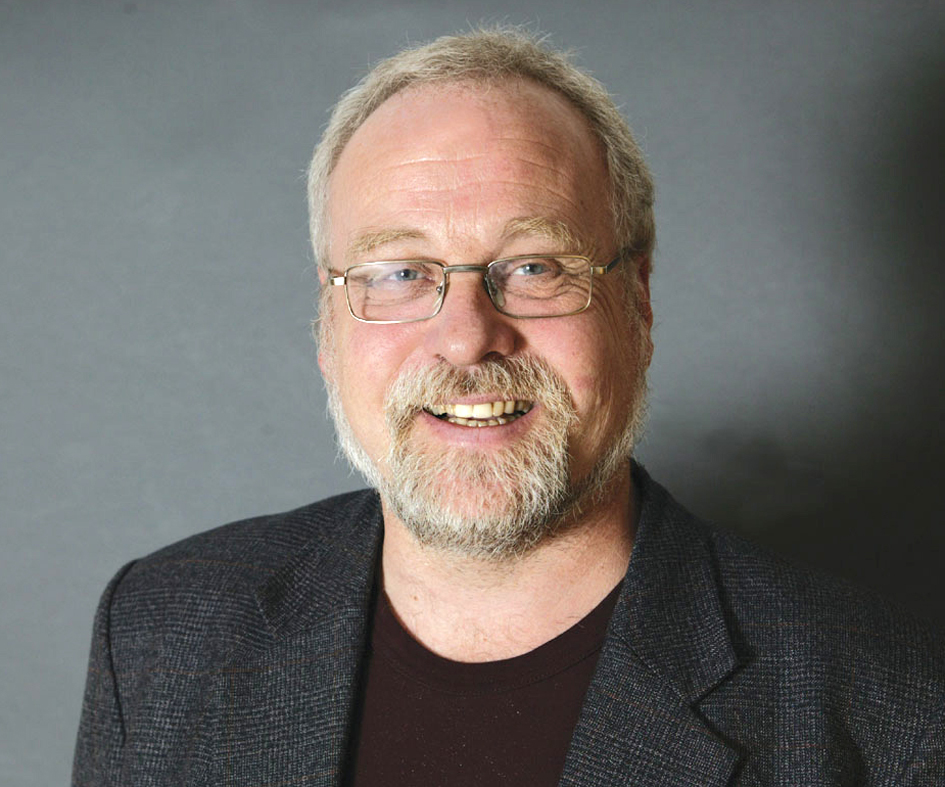
Serving as Secretary General for 18 years, Atle Sommerfeldt is the longest sitting NCA general secretary.

- Andreas Grasmo (1947– 1952)
- Gunnar H. Østenstad (1952–1955)
- Olav Egeland (1954–1966)
- Elias J. Berge (1966–1973)
- Sigurd Aske (1974–1978)
- Jan. Erichsen (1978–1992)
- Per Midteide (1992–1994)
- Atle Sommerfeldt (1994 –2012)
- Anne-Marie Helland (2012–2018)
- Dagfinn Høybråten (2019–2025)
- Anne Cecilie Kaltenborn (2025– Present)

== Work ==
Norwegian Church Aid works in three ways:

- Emergency preparedness and response: saving lives and protecting people in emergency situations
- Long-term development aid: supporting local communities to achieve development over time
- Advocacy: promoting democracy and human rights by influencing decision-making processes
