= Norwegian Museum of Decorative Arts and Design =

Former museum in Oslo, Norway

- Kunstindustrimuseet
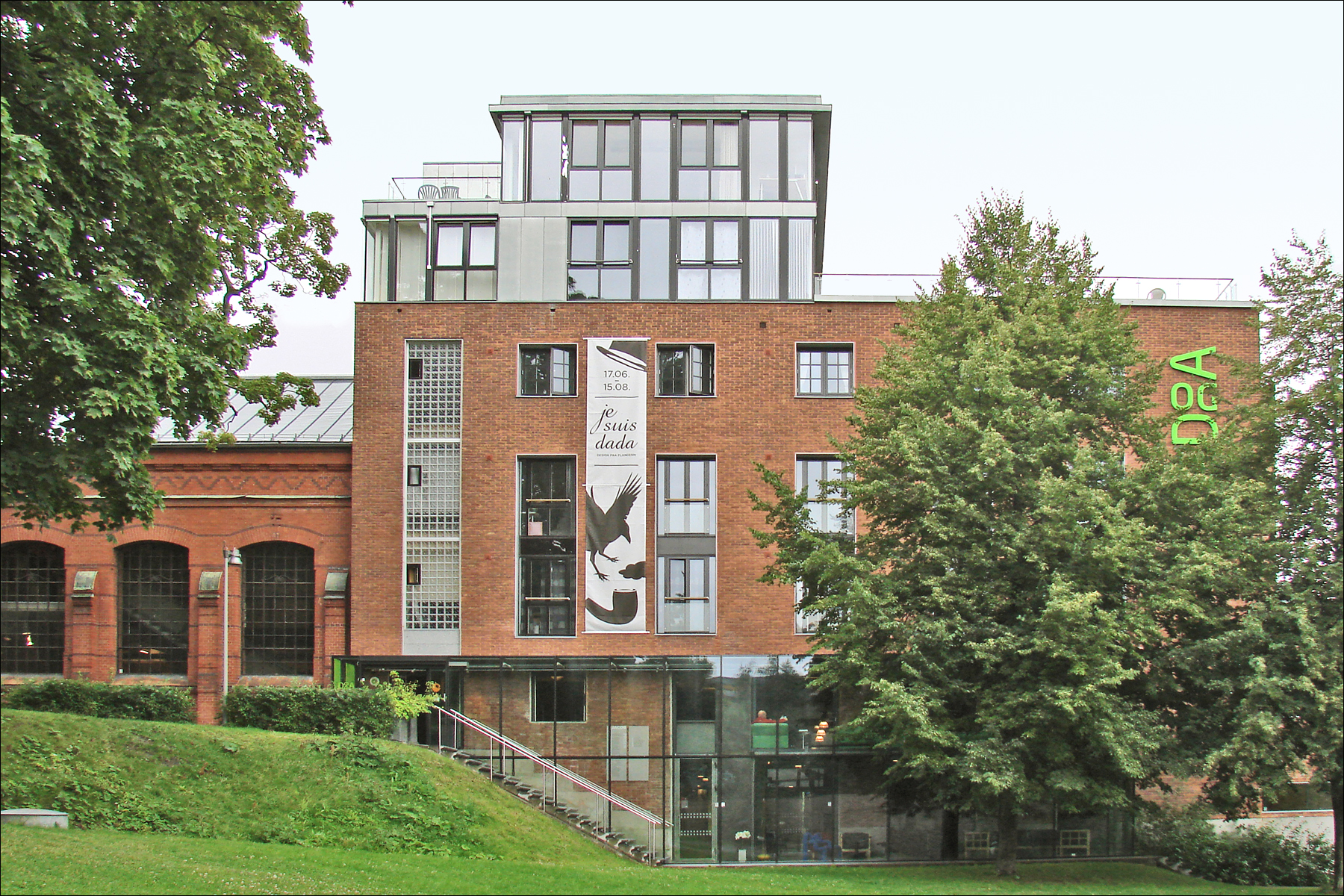
- Established: 1876
- Dissolved: 16 October 2016
- Location: Oslo, Norway
- Coordinates: 59.9184°N 10.7431°E
- Type: Decorative arts, design
- Founder: Lorentz Dietrichson, Nicolay Nicolaysen
- Director: Henrik A. Grosch (first)
- Architect: Adolf Bredo Greve; Ingvar M. O. Hjorth
- Website: nasjonalmuseet.no

The Norwegian Museum of Decorative Arts and Design (Norwegian: Kunstindustrimuseet) was a museum in Oslo, Norway. Its collection included clothing, textiles, furniture, silver, glass, ceramics, and handicrafts. In 2003, the museum became administratively a part of the National Museum of Art, Architecture and Design (Nasjonalmuseet for kunst, arkitektur og design). The museum closed on 16 October 2016, and its collection moved to the new National Museum building, which opened in 2022.

== History ==
The museum was created on the initiative of Lorentz Dietrichson and Nicolay Nicolaysen. It was established in 1876 as one of the first of its kind in Europe. The first director was Henrik A. Grosch (1848–1929), nephew of the noted architect Christian Heinrich Grosch. The museum was located at St. Olavsgate 1 in Oslo. From 1904, it was located with the Norwegian National Academy of Craft and Art Industry in a building designed by Adolf Bredo Greve (1871–1931) and Ingvar M. O. Hjorth (1862–1927).
