= Benjamin Wegner Nørregaard =

Norwegian military officer, engineer, journalist, diplomat and war correspondent

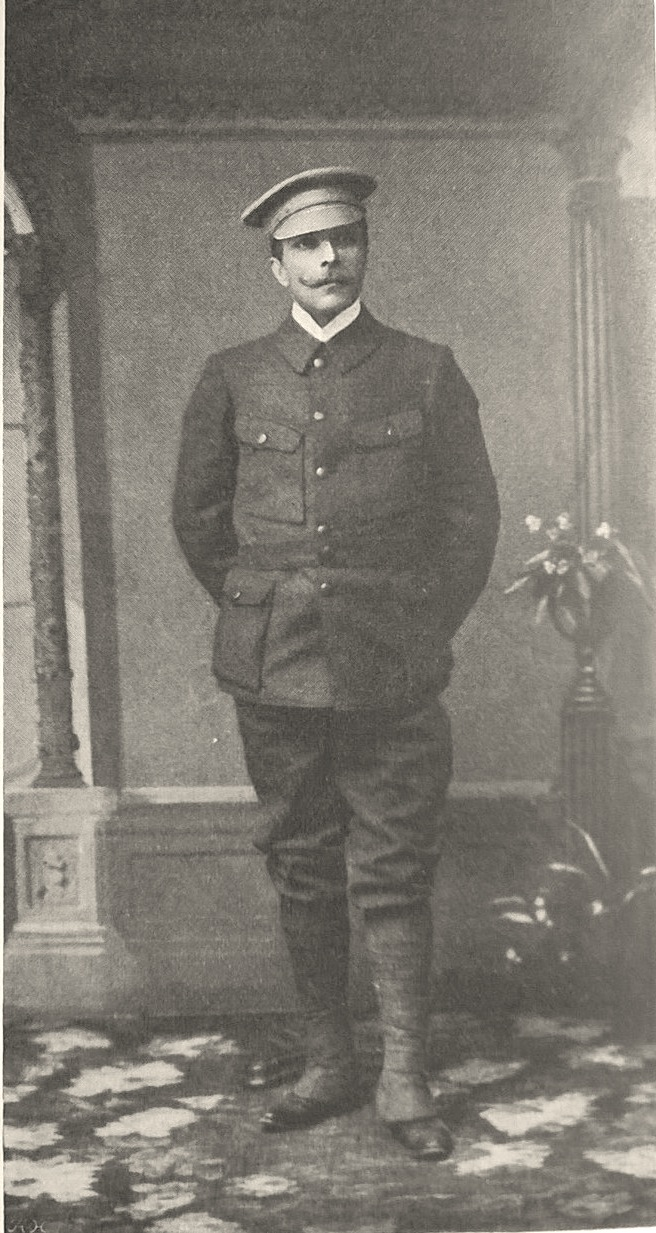
Benjamin Wegner Nørregaard. A picture from his book The Great Siege: The Investment and Fall of Port Arthur (1906).

Benjamin Wegner Nørregaard (3 October 1861 – 24 April 1935) was a Norwegian military officer, railway engineer, adventurer, journalist, diplomat and internationally renowned war correspondent. He spent several years in China and served as Minister of Labour in the Tianjin Provisional Government during the Boxer Rebellion. He later worked as a war correspondent for the Daily Mail and for Scandinavian newspapers, and covered several conflicts in East Asia and Europe. He is especially known for his books The Great Siege, on the siege of Port Arthur during the Russo-Japanese War, and War, on the Boxer Rebellion.

== Career ==
Nørregaard graduated as an officer in 1881 and became a captain in the field artillery in the Norwegian Army in 1894. Described as an adventurer, he left the country in 1895 without permission of his military superiors, effectively ending his military career, and in the following years, he lived in East Asia during a period marked by upheavals and war. He worked as a railway engineer for the Imperial Chinese Railways from 1896 to 1900. During the Boxer Rebellion in 1900, he was employed by the Allies as head of the Ministry of Labour in the Tianjin Provisional Government, which governed the major city Tianjin and surrounding areas, a position he held from 1900 to 1902. He was also the architect of the new, monumental government building in Tianjin.

He rose to journalistic prominence as a war correspondent of the Daily Mail during the Russo-Japanese War (1904–05) and during the First Balkan War (1912–13). He witnessed the Siege of Port Arthur and published the book The Great Siege: The Investment and Fall of Port Arthur (Methuen Publishing, 1906) and the book War (1908) on the Boxer Rebellion, which were "written with great journalistic talent." From 1906 to 1908, he lived in St. Petersburg as a foreign correspondent of the Norwegian newspaper Morgenbladet and the Danish newspaper Vort Land, and gave a vivid portrayal of the revolutionary turmoil in Russia. In 1909, he relocated to Berlin as a correspondent for Morgenbladet. In the same year, he was appointed a "secret press envoy" to Berlin and Paris for the Norwegian Ministry of Foreign Affairs, a position he held until 1911. From 1911, he was permanently employed by Morgenbladet. He also wrote for the Swedish newspaper Dagens Nyheter. During the First World War, he was among the leading commentators on the ongoing war in the neutral countries. In addition to writing on war and foreign policy, he was a food writer, and wrote humorous short stories.

He was a son of the Norwegian colonel, and aide-de-camp to king Charles, Hans Jacob Nørregaard and Sophie Wegner. His mother was a daughter of the industrialist Benjamin Wegner and Henriette Seyler, of the Hamburg Berenberg-Gossler-Seyler banking dynasty. He was a brother of the noted lawyer Harald Nørregaard and of wine merchant and consul in Tarragona Ludvig Paul Rudolf Nørregaard. He married Wilhelmine Sissenère in 1898. She was formerly married to the Norwegian cabinet minister and Director-General of the Norwegian State Railways Hans Nysom. He had no children.

He is mentioned as a military and foreign policy commentator in Morgenbladet during the First World War in the novel Lillelord by Johan Borgen.

== Honours ==
- Tianjin Provisional Government Medal in Gold (one of only 12 issued to members of the Tianjin Provisional Government)

== Works ==
- Benjamin Wegner Nørregaard, Port Arthurs beleiring, Aschehoug, Kristiania, 1905, 256 pages, illustrated
- Benjamin Wegner Nørregaard, The Great Siege: The Investment and Fall of Port Arthur, Methuen Publishing, 1906, 308 pages
- Benjamin Wegner Nørregaard, Krig: Skildringer og Oplevelser, Aschehoug, Kristiania, 1908, 168 pages.
