= Tianjin Provisional Government =

Viceroy's Government (July – August 1900) Provisional Government of Tianjin (August 1900 – 1902) Gouvernement provisoire du district de Tientsin (French) 天津都統衙門 (Chinese)
- 1900–1902
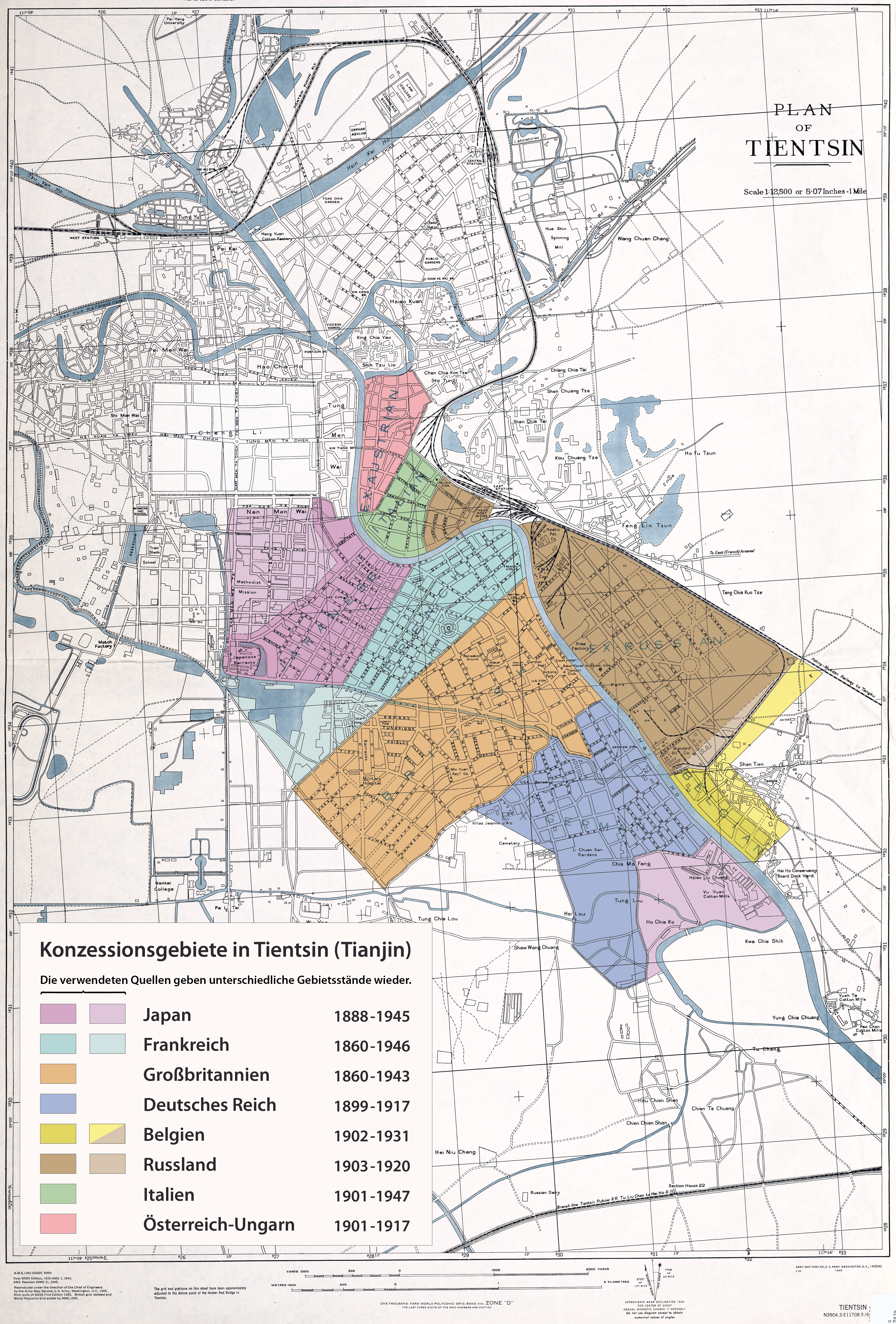
- Map of Tianjin after the occupation Location of the Tianjin Provisional Government
- Capital: Tianjin
- Government: Military occupation
  - Minister of Labour: Benjamin Wegner Nørregaard
  - Minister of the Interior: Benjamin Wegner Nørregaard
- History
  - Boxer Rebellion and military occupation of Zhili Province by Eight Nation Alliance: 1900
  - Disestablished: 1902
Preceded by
Qing Dynasty
Succeeded by
Qing Dynasty
Belgian concession of Tianjin
Austro-Hungarian concession of Tianjin
Russian concession of Tianjin
Italian concession of Tianjin

The Tianjin Provisional Government (also spelled Tientsin Provisional Government, Provisional Government of Tianjin, Provisional Government of Tientsin) (French: Gouvernement provisoire du district de Tientsin, Chinese: 天津都統衙門) was a government formed by the Eight-Nation Alliance during the Boxer Rebellion in China, which controlled the major city Tianjin and its surrounding areas from 1900 to 1902.

After the Boxers seized much of Tianjin in June 1900, the city was recaptured by the Eight-Nation Alliance in July 1900. Seven of the members of the Eight-Nation Alliance (Russia, the United Kingdom, Japan, Germany, France, the United States, and Italy) established the Tianjin Provisional Government on 30 July 1900. The government was first known as the Viceroy's Government and was renamed the Tianjin Provisional Government on 14 August.

The Tianjin Provisional Government had military control over Tianjin, Chinghai, Ningho and some other regions, with 8 subordinate executive organizations. It had a patrolling team of 900 allied forces gunmen directly under its control. The Norwegian railway engineer and former officer Benjamin Wegner Nørregaard, who had worked in China for the last few years, was employed as a sort of minister of labour, and also designed the monumental government headquarters.

Most of the United States 15th Infantry Regiment arrived in Tianjin on 16 August 1900, as part of the China Relief Expedition. The Tianjin Provisional Government existed until 15 August 1902, when it returned control of its territory to the Chinese Qing government. The Eight-Nation Alliance however maintained a military presence in the area to ensure open access to Beijing.

== Tianjin Provisional Government Medal ==
The Tianjin Provisional Government Medal was presented to members of the Provisional Government. It was designed by J. Chevet and manufactured by the Japanese firm of Tenshodo. 12 gold, 60 silver, and 153 bronze medals were issued. The obverse shows the flags of the seven alliance members who formed the government along with its French name, and the reverse inscription is its Chinese name.

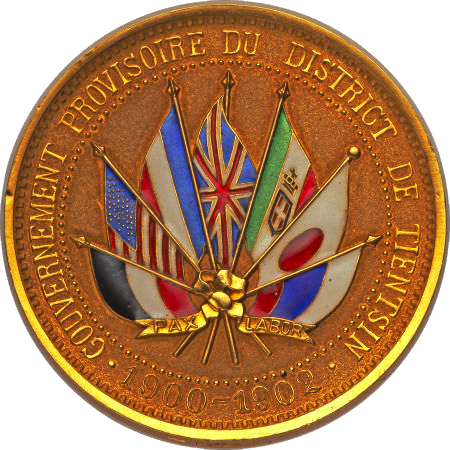
Tianjin Provisional Government Medal (obverse)

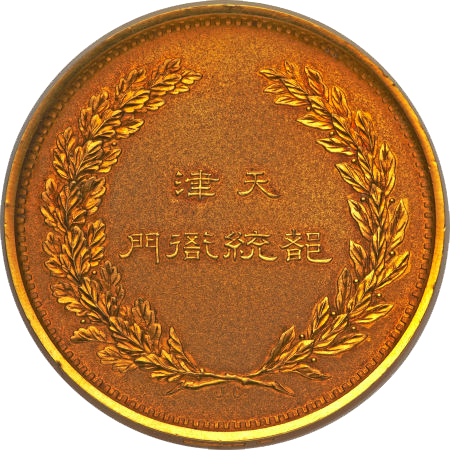
Tianjin Provisional Government Medal (reverse)

Known recipients of this very rare medal include:

- Benjamin Wegner Nørregaard (Gold)

A bronze medal was donated by Paul Bauer (Austrian consul general, Tianjin) bronze) to the British Museum in 1932
