= Enteroxenos parastichopoli =

Scientific classification
- Kingdom: Animalia
- Phylum: Mollusca
- Class: Gastropoda
- Subclass: Caenogastropoda
- Order: Littorinimorpha
- Family: Eulimidae
- Genus: Enteroxenos
- Species: E. parastichopoli

Binomial name
- Enteroxenos parastichopoli Tikasingh, 1961

Synonyms
- Comenteroxenos parastichopoli Tikasingh, 1961

Species of gastropod

Enteroxenos parastichopoli is a species of small sea snail, a marine gastropod mollusk in the family Eulimidae.
