= Thordar Quelprud =

Norwegian geneticist (1901–1992)

- Born: September 2, 1902; Christiania, Norway
- Died: May 16, 1992 (aged 89)
- Occupation: Geneticist

Thordar Fladmoe Quelprud (September 2, 1901 – May 16, 1992) was a Norwegian geneticist. Quelprud was a student of Kristine Bonnevie, who established the Institute for Genetic Research (Norwegian: Institut for Arvelighetsforskning) in 1916. Bonnevie sent him to Berlin in the 1920s, where he became fascinated with German scientific racism. He was appointed a professor of genetic studies at the University of Oslo during the Second World War, and he was removed from the position in 1945.

== Family ==
Thordar Quelprud was the son of the painter Knut Qvelprud (1860–1954) and the music teacher Nora Ingeleif Fladmoe-Qvelprud (1864–1949). Thordar Quelprud was married, but he had no children. The surname Quelprud comes from the Kvelprud farm in Ål Municipality, where Quelprud's father was born.

== Before the Second World War ==
Quelprud was a participant in 1929 at the 18th Norwegian Scandinavian Natural Scientists' Meeting in Copenhagen, where he was listed as having a master's degree and affiliated with the University of Oslo's Zoology Laboratory. He published several articles on anatomical variants. Quelprud originally wanted to work with fruit flies, but Bonnevie felt he should become a human geneticist. He graduated with a master's degree in 1930 and received a fellowship from the Institute for Genetic Research in 1935. Quelprud studied ear morphology in particular, and a hereditary normal variant called Quelprud's nodule on the posterior surface of the auricle is named after him. He was a member of the Nasjonal Samling party from 1934 to 1936 but then withdrew. He then started collaborating with Alf L. Ørbeck on Norwegian families with Huntington's disease. In 1938, Ørbeck and Quelprud traveled to Vegusdal Municipality and Gjerstad Municipality, where there was a family history of Huntington's disease, to get an impression of the conditions, and Quelprud filmed Ørbeck's patients there. After that, Quelprud began working on family genealogies based on this work.

== During the Second World War ==
Quelprud rejoined Nasjonal Samling in 1941. In the fall of 1942, during the German occupation of Norway, the German occupation authorities established an Oslo branch of the Ahnenerbe think tank, which was a research institute of the Schutzstaffel (SS). Its purpose was to raise the racial consciousness of the Germanic people. Ahnenerbe attracted a few marginal people in Norway, but it quickly discovered that the Norwegian academic environment could not be counted on.

The Nasjonal Samling Councillor of State Rolf Jørgen Fuglesang wanted research on the population policy of the future and wanted a genetic biology institute, which could, among other things, provide expert expertise on the Romanisæl Travellers. The Genetic Biology Institute (Arvebiologisk Institutt) was established in 1942. It was to engage in both research and teaching, and Thordar Quelprud was appointed the institute's director with a teaching position.

Quelprud gave lectures on genetic biology and racial science at the Nasjonal Samling political school in Jessheim, and he wrote articles for the party's periodical NS Månedshefte. Quelprud was considered politically naive, but he nonetheless enjoyed the status of a kind of racial ideologue. When the university was closed in November 1943, most of the activity at the institute stopped. Quelprud became frustrated with this development, sought leave as a lecturer, and resigned from Nasjonal Samling in the fall of 1944.

== After the Second World War ==
Shortly after Norway's liberation in May 1945, Quelprud was dismissed from his position at the University of Oslo. Quelprud's colleague Ørbeck had no connection with Nasjonal Samling and, upon a direct request from Ørbeck, Quelprud stated "with honor and conscience" (på ære og samvittighet) that he was not a Nazi. However, Quelprud was sentenced to 10 years of loss of civil rights, according to Ørbeck because he had given a lecture at the University on "Lysenko's attack on acquired inheritance." After the war, the question was raised of completing and publishing Ørbeck's work on Huntington's disease. Ørbeck sought contact with the Human Genetics Institute, but felt that he was given a cold shoulder because of his cooperation with Quelprud. Olav Hanssen, however, presented the work in a meeting for Matematisk-naturvitenskapelig klasse in 1953. Ørbeck was invited to the Academy of Sciences and gave a lecture on the subject just before the work was printed in 1954. However, Quelprud was not invited to the Academy of Sciences and its dinners, but closer relations were established. Ørbeck then made arrangements for Quelprud to at least have access to a film projector and present images of the family genealogies. Shortly thereafter, Quelprud's sentence expired. The question of whether their work should have counted for a medical doctorate was considered. It was a fundamental problem that it was written by two authors, one of whom had lost his civil rights, and that a doctoral dissertation should have been written by one person. After this, Ørbeck sent all the material he had collected to Quelprud with a request that he deposit it in the University of Oslo Library's folklore collection, where, as Ørbeck wrote in 1980, "it is readily available."
