= Hjort (law firm) =

Norwegian law firm

Advokatfirmaet Hjort DA
- Company type: Law firm
- Founded: 1893
- Founder: Harald Nørregaard
- Headquarters: Oslo, Norway
- Owner: 36 partners
- Number of employees: 130
- Website: hjort.no

Hjort (legally Advokatfirmaet Hjort DA, originally Harald Nørregaard, later Nørregaard & Bonnevie and Nørregaard & Hjort) is a law firm in Norway, headquartered in Oslo. It was founded in 1893 by Harald Nørregaard (1864–1938), a supreme court advocate who was also chairman of the Norwegian Bar Association and Edvard Munch's close friend, adviser and lawyer.

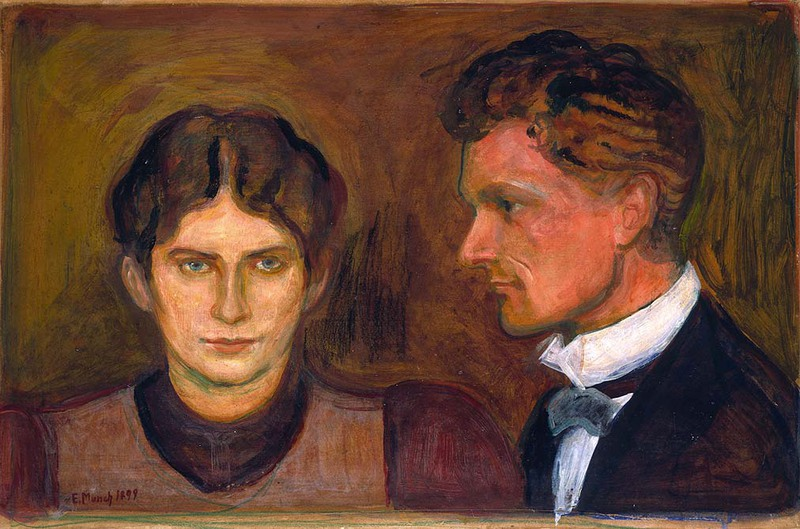
The firm's founder Harald Nørregaard, painted by Edvard Munch (1899). (National Gallery)

In his lifetime, Nørregaard was one of Norway's preeminent lawyers. He was "known for his eloquence in court. It was said of him that he dominated the courtroom with his very presence, and his warm voice settled around the High Court as velvet." For some years, the firm was a partnership consisting of Nørregaard and Thomas Bonnevie, who became a supreme court justice in 1922. In 1932 the young lawyer Johan Bernhard Hjort joined Nørregaard's law firm, and after World War II the firm was continued by Hjort and renamed Advokatfirmaet Hjort.

As of 2018 the firm is owned by 35 partners and have approximately 100 additional employees.
