= Louise Averill Svendsen =

Louise Averill Svendsen (1915–1994) was an American art historian.

== Early life and education ==
Born in Old Town, Maine, Svendsen pursued an undergraduate degree in art at Wellesley College and later completed her Ph.D. at Yale University with a dissertation on 19th-century American painter, John Vanderlyn.

In 1950, she married Thoralf Svendsen, a Norwegian diplomat who predeceased her in 1983.

== Career ==
Svendsen began her career as an academic teaching art history at Duke University, Goucher College, and American University during the 1940s and early 1950s. She joined the Guggenheim Museum in 1954 as a lecturer, hired by James Johnson Sweeney, the museum's first director. Her role was pivotal during the late 1950s as the museum prepared to move into its iconic Frank Lloyd Wright-designed building on Fifth Avenue. Svendsen was instrumental in organizing the museum's departments and galleries and edited the museum's first collection handbook, published in 1959 to coincide with the building's inauguration.

At the Guggenheim, she held various positions, including curator of education, associate curator, and senior curator by 1978. She organized notable retrospectives for artists such as Edvard Munch, Ilya Bolotowsky, Alberto Giacometti, and Paul Klee, and wrote extensively, including Klee at the Guggenheim (1977).

Upon retiring in 1982, she was named curator emeritus and spent her final years as a consultant at Sotheby's in the impressionist and modern paintings department. Ward Jackson, the Guggenheim's archivist, lauded her Yankee ingenuity, likening it to the legendary figures of Alfred Barr and Lloyd Goodrich.
