= Enteroxenos =

Scientific classification
- Domain: Eukaryota
- Kingdom: Animalia
- Phylum: Mollusca
- Class: Gastropoda
- Subclass: Caenogastropoda
- Order: Littorinimorpha
- Family: Eulimidae
- Genus: Enteroxenos; Bonnevie, 1902

Type species
- Enteroxenos ostergreni Bonnevie, 1902

Synonyms
- Enteroxenus

Genus of gastropods

Enteroxenos is a genus of very small parasitic sea snails, marine gastropod mollusks in the family Eulimidae.

== Description ==
These small snails have no mouth or gut, and absorb nutrients through their body wall. These odd animals look much more like worms than snails, but the larval form is a veliger, which is characteristic of mollusks.

== Species ==
Species within this genus include the following:

- Enteroxenos bouvieri (Risbec, 1953)
- Enteroxenos muelleri (Semper, 1868)
- Enteroxenos oestergreni Bonnevie, 1902
- Enteroxenos parastichopoli (Tikasingh, 1961)

Species brought into synonymy

- Enteroxenos ostergreni (Bonnevie, 1902): synonym of Enteroxenos oestergreni (Bonnevie, 1902)

== Reproduction ==
The female is significantly larger than the male and may grow up to 15 cm (6 in) in length. The females become hosts to the smaller males, which then fertilise their eggs.
