= Conrad Bonnevie-Svendsen =

Norwegian priest and government minister

Conrad Bonnevie-Svendsen at the Rotary International 1949–50 Board of Directors.

Conrad Bonnevie-Svendsen (11 April 1898 – 12 June 1983) was a Norwegian priest and government minister.

== Biography ==
His father was Conrad Svendsen, Norway's first priest for the deaf. Conrad the son worked at his father's school for deaf at Nordstrand while studying theology at the university, and eventually took over his father's leadership of the school. During the German occupation of Norway in World War II, he helped organise the resistance, and had to flee to Sweden towards the end of the war.

After the war, Einar Gerhardsen formed an interim coalition government lasting from 25 June till 5 November. Bonnevie-Svendsen was appointed consultative Minister of Education and Church Affairs, representing Hjemmefronten (the Norwegian resistance movement). He later helped found the organisation now known as Norwegian Church Aid. He became vice president of Rotary International in 1949, and in 1952 he was made honorary doctor at the University of Kiel.
