= Zoë Svendsen =

British director and academic

Zoë Svendsen is a British director and academic. She is currently working as a lecturer in Drama and Performance at the University of Cambridge.

== Career ==
Svendsen became a lecturer at the University of Cambridge in 2013. Svendsen directed the interactive performance, World Factory at the Young Vic in 2015. From July 2016 to June 2017, she was part of the Future Scenarios networked residency programme- a project designed to imagine different futures under the auspices of climate change. From October 2017 to July 2018 Svendsen worked as an early career fellow at Centre for Research in the Arts, Social Sciences and Humanities (CRASSH), moving to Lent Term in 2018. In 2017, she was a resident at the Attenborough Centre of Creative Arts. She is an honorary research fellow at Birkbeck Centre for Contemporary Theatre.

== Works ==
=== We know not what we may be ===
Svensden is currently working on an installation entitled WE KNOW NOT WHAT WE MAY BE which appeared at the Barbican in September 2018 as part of its Art of Change season. Over the last 2 years there has been a series of research in public conversations where Svendsen has interviewed a series of experts asking the questions: ‘What is the best possible economic structure for responding to climate change and what would it be like to live in this future system?’. The information and ideas gathered from these interviews formed part of the installation. WE KNOW NOT WHAT WE MAY BE was produced by Artsadmin.

=== World Factory ===
World Factory is an interdisciplinary, interactive performance created by Zoe Svendsen and Simon Daw. The project explored global consumerism using the premise of the textile industry to illustrate the complex problems created by consumer demand. As part of their research for the performance, Svendsen and Daw travelled to China and commissioned the production of a shirt. They also interviewed Chinese factory workers whose testaments form part of the show. The show was first shown in 2015 at the Young Vic. It later toured in Brighton, Cambridge and Manchester. It formed part of the fabrications festival in 2017 at Brierfield Mills - produced by Artsadmin.

=== 3rd Ring out: rehearsing the future ===
This work was written and performed in 2010/2011 in several sites around the UK, including Edinburgh, Newcastle, Norwich, Ipswich and Greenwich. Svendsen set the scene in 2033, a small audience is invited into a converted orange shipping container where they assume the role of emergency planners. An ecological emergency - caused by global warming - unfolds in 'real time' and the audience has to take collective decisions, steered by an actor assuming the role of emergency commander.

== Publications ==
- 2018 World Factory: The Game Nick Hern Books, ISBN 9781848426337, Authors Zoe Svendsen and Simon Daw
