= Carl Bonnevie =

Norwegian politician (1881–1972)

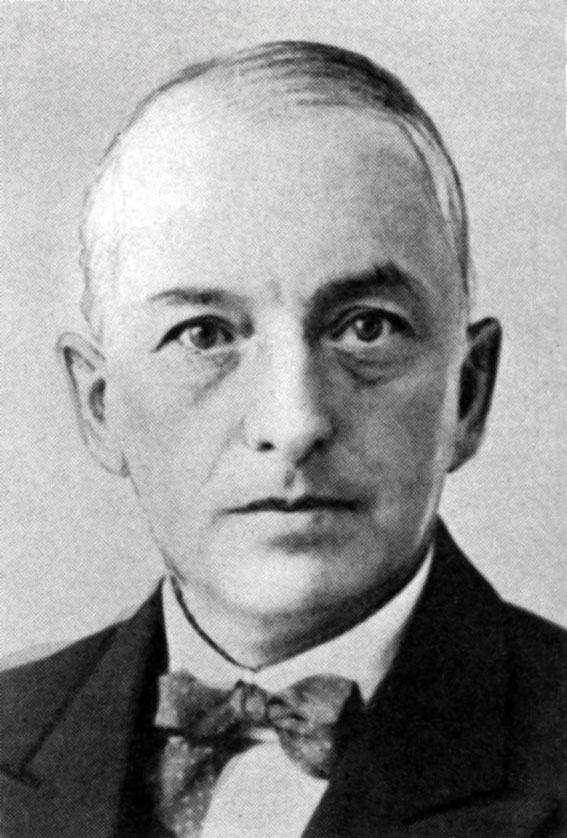
- Born: 28 April 1881; Trondheim, Norway
- Died: 26 September 1972 (aged 91); Oslo, Norway
- Occupations: Jurist; Politician
- Organization: Norwegian Peace Association
- Known for: Member of the Storting; Peace activist
- Parent: Jacob Aall Bonnevie
- Relatives: Kristine Bonnevie (half sister); Thomas Bonnevie (half brother)

Carl Emil Christian Bonnevie (28 April 1881 – 26 September 1972) was a Norwegian jurist and peace activist. He also served as a Member of the Norwegian Parliament.

== Biography ==
Bonnevie was born in Trondheim as the son of Jacob Aall Bonnevie (1838-1904) and his second wife, Susanne Bryn (1848-1927). He was the younger brother of physician Kristine Bonnevie (1872-1948) and judge Thomas Bonnevie (1879-1960).

He took his artium at Aars and Voss School in 1900. He was a reserve officer in the Norwegian Army, attaining the rank of Second Lieutenant in 1901. He was awarded his Cand. jur. in 1904. In 1905, he became a magistrate in Moss in Østfold. The following the year, he became deputy proxy in Vinger Municipality and Odalen in Hedmark county. He was a prosecutor in Kristiania from 1907 to 1910. He was a lawyer at Kristiania Court of Appeal from 1915. From 1923 to 1929 he was a District Court Judge in Kristiania. He was assigned to the Agder Court of Appeal in 1936, Eidsivating Court of Appeal from 1949 and Borgarting Court of Appeal in 1950.

From 1917 to 1919, he was editor of the journal Folkefred. He was a board member of the Norwegian Peace Association (Norges Fredsforening) from 1916 to 1924 and chaired the organization from 1926 to 1929.

He served as a member of the Parliament of Norway from Bodø and Narvik (Bodø og Narvik) in Nordland with the Labour Party from 1913 to 1915 and for Nordland fylke from 1934 to 1936.

== See also ==
- List of peace activists
