= Honoratus Bonnevie (physician) =

Norwegian physician (1726–1811)

- Born: December 5, 1726; Odense, Denmark
- Died: November 8, 1811 (aged 84); Near Horten, Norway
- Occupation: Physician

Honoratus Bonnevie (5 December 1726 – 8 November 1811) was a Norwegian physician.

He was born in Odense, Denmark as the son of Honoré Bonnevie and his wife Boel Corneliusdatter. His mother hailed from Svelvik, Norway whereas his father hailed from Antibes, France. Honoré had migrated to Norway from France and settled in Brevik in 1714, but then moved to Denmark in 1719. He first went to Fredericia, but then finally settled in Odense in 1723. Honoratus Bonnevie was educated as a pharmacist in Odense, then he studied medicine at the University of Copenhagen, graduating in 1749. He came to Norway in 1754, and worked in Raabygdelaget, Stavanger, Egersund and Mandal. His son Andreas was born here in 1782.

Honoratus Bonnevie was married twice. He retired as a physician in 1800, and lived in Mandal until the city fire of 1810, where he lost his house and belongings. He lived with his son Tørris Bonnevie near Horten until his death in 1811. Through Tørris he was a grandfather of navy captain Carl Siegfried Bonnevie. He was also a grandfather of politician Honoratus Bonnevie.
