= Lorentz Dietrichson =

Norwegian author and art historian

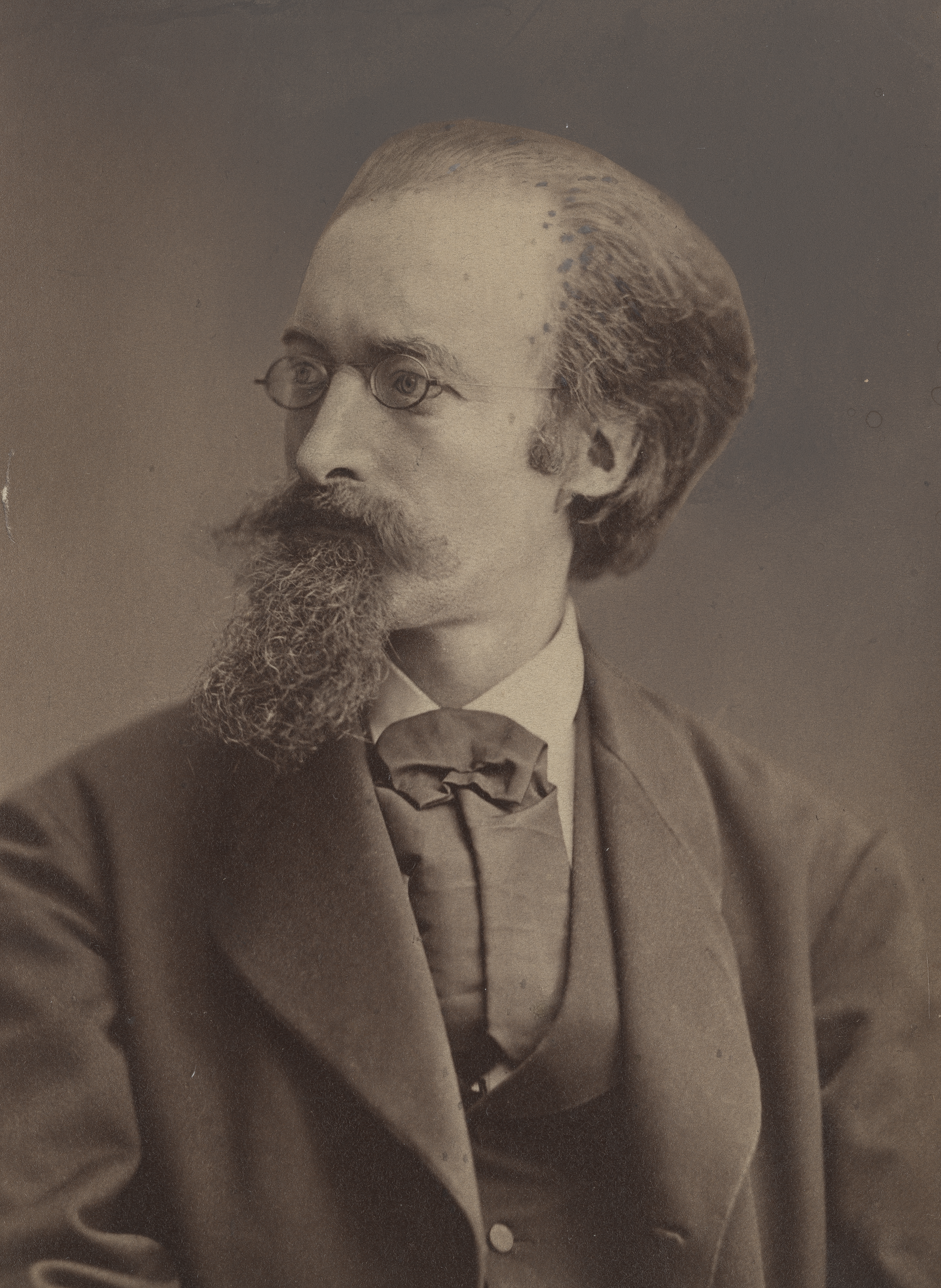
- Born: 1 January 1834; Bergen
- Died: 6 March 1917; Christiania
- Resting place: Cemetery of Our Saviour
- Occupations: Poet, art historian, writer, aesthetician, librarian
- Spouse: Johanne Mathilde Dietrichson

Lorentz Henrik Segelcke Dietrichson (1 January 1834 Bergen - 6 March 1917) was a Norwegian poet and historian of art and literature.

== Biography ==
Lorentz Henrik Segelcke Dietrichson was the son of Fredrik Dietrichson and Marie Heiberg Dahl. Dietrichson grew up in Bergen as an only child in a home of cultural officials interested in the parents' social circle. While an undergraduate in the University of Christiania, he composed many clever student songs which were collected and published in 1859. After school graduation in 1853 at the University of Christiania and other exams the following year he began to study theology, but he was more keen to cultivate their literary and artistic interests. In 1862 he married painter Johanne Mathilde Bonnevie.

For a time he served as instructor at Uppsala University and subsequently for three years was secretary to the Norwegian minister at Rome. On his return he became connected with the administration of the Nationalmuseum in Stockholm. In 1869, he was appointed professor in the Royal Swedish Academy of Arts in Stockholm. Six years later he moved to the University of Christiania as professor of the history of art.

Dietrichson was a well-known participator in the public health debate in both Norway and neighboring Sweden, and as such, he was known for his opposition toward corsets, which at this point in time was a serious health issue, and as such supported the Swedish Dress Reform Society, and notably helped to spread the movement to Norway.

He published several volumes mostly dealing with Norwegian art in the Middle Ages. He published Læredigtet i Nordens poetiske Literatur (1860), Kivle-Slaatten. Thema og Variationer over et norsk Folkesagn. Et polemisk Digt (1879) and numerous other works. After examining Danish and Swedish 18th century literature, he published two-volume Omrids af den norske Poesis Historie (1866-1869). It was the first presentation of Norway's history and development of literature from folk tales.

== Selected works ==
- Olaf Liljekrands. Et Digt, 1858
- Samfundsviser og Sange af Jørgen Latiner, 1859
- Læredigtet i Nordens poetiske Literatur, 1860
- Den bildende Kunst i dens historiske Forhold til Religionsformerne. Et indledende kunsthistorisk Omrids, 1862
- Indledning i Studiet af Sveriges Literatur i vort Aarhundrede, 1862
- En arbetare. Skådespel i tre akter, 1872
- Karl Folkunge. Dramatisk dikt i fyra akter, 1874
- Adolph Tidemand, hans Liv og hans Værker. Et bidrag til den norske Kunsts Historie, 1878–79
- Den norske Treskjærerkunst, dens Oprindelse og Udvikling. En foreløbig Undersøgelse, 1878
- Kivle-Slaatten. Thema og Variationer over et norsk Folkesagn. Et polemisk Digt, 1879
- Christusbilledet. Studier over den typiske Christusfremstillings Oprindelse, Udvikling og Opløsning, 1880
- Michelagniolo. En biografisk studi, 1880
- Skulpturmuseets Samling af Afstøbninger og originale Billedhuggerarbejder. En historisk-kritisk Beskrivelse, 1881
- Nationalgalleriets Samling af Malerier og Billedhuggerarbeider. En historisk-kritisk Beskrivelse, 1882
- Antinoos. Eine kunstarchäologische Untersuchung, 1884
- Fra Kunstens Verden. Foredrag og Studier, 1885
- Det norske Nationalgalleri. Dets tilblivelse og udvikling i anledning af dets 50-aarige tilværelse, 1887
- De norske stavkirker. Studier over deres system, oprindelse og historiske utvikling. Et bidrag til Norges middelalderske bygningskunsts historie, 1892
- Camilla Collett og hendes Indlæg i Kvindesagen, 1894
- Gude. En biografisk Skizze, 1898–99
- Vore fædres Verk. Norges Kunst i Middelalderen. En populær Fremstilling, 1906

== Other sources ==
- Gilman, D. C.; Peck, H. T.; Colby, F. M., eds. (1905). "Dietrichson, Lorentz Henrik Segelcke" . New International Encyclopedia (1st ed.). New York: Dodd, Mead.
- Rines, George Edwin, ed. (1920). "Dietrichson, Lorentz Henrik Segelcke" . Encyclopedia Americana.
