= Kristine Bonnevie =

Norwegian biologist and politician (1872–1948)

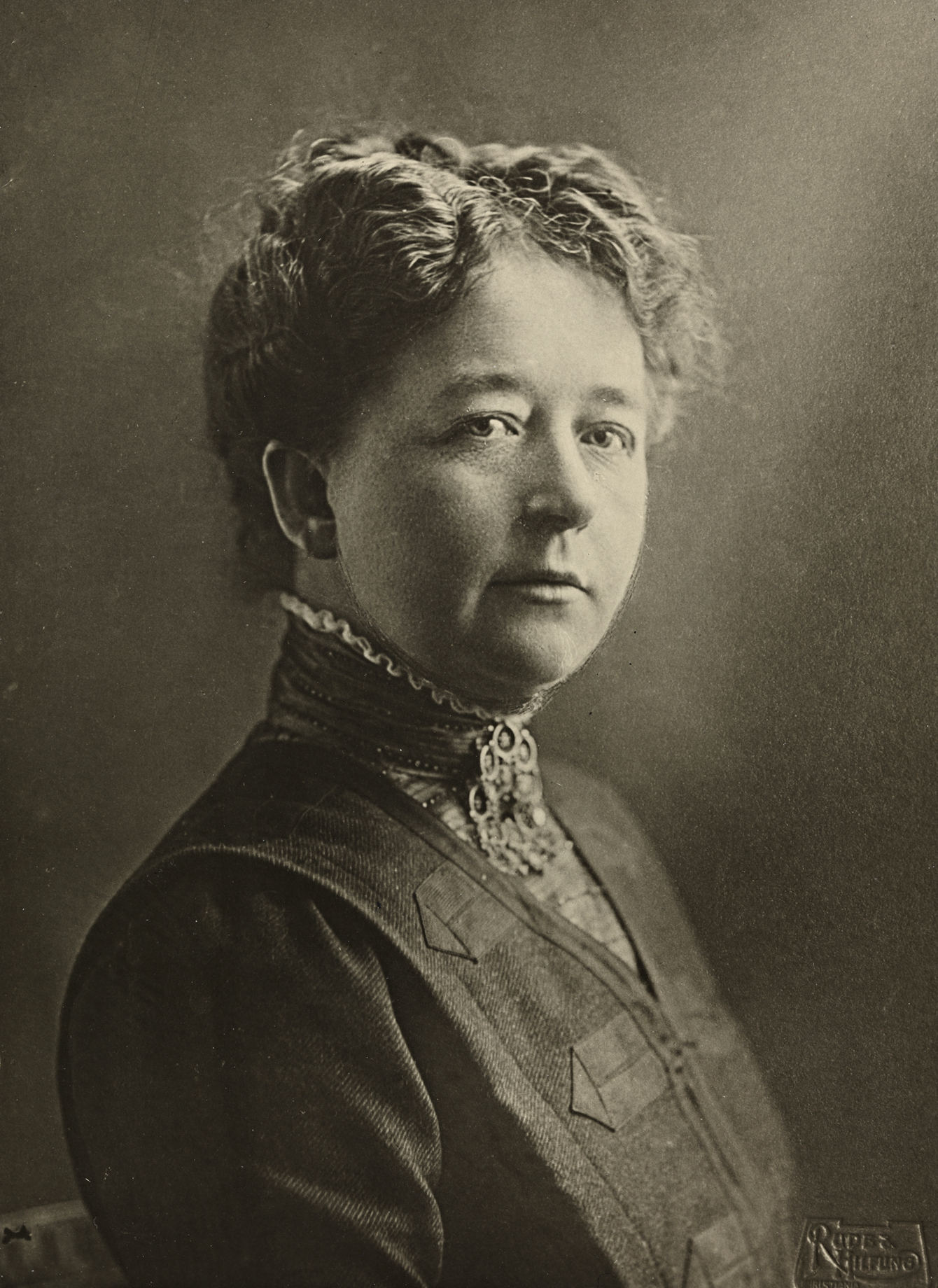
- Born: 8 October 1872; Trondhjem, Norway
- Died: 30 August 1948 (aged 75); Oslo, Norway
- Citizenship: Norway
- Scientific career
- Workplaces: Royal Frederick University
- Doctoral students: Thor Heyerdahl

Kristine Elisabet Heuch Bonnevie (8 October 1872 – 30 August 1948) was a Norwegian biologist. She was the first woman to graduate with a science doctorate in Norway (and the second woman overall), Norway's first woman professor, a women's rights activist, and a politician for the Free-minded Liberal Party. Her fields of research were cytology, genetics, and embryology. She was among the first women to be elected to political office in Norway. She suggested the epic voyage of her graduate student Thor Heyerdahl on the raft Kon-tiki, a voyage memorialized in the Kon-Tiki Museum, Oslo.

== Youth, primary, and secondary education ==
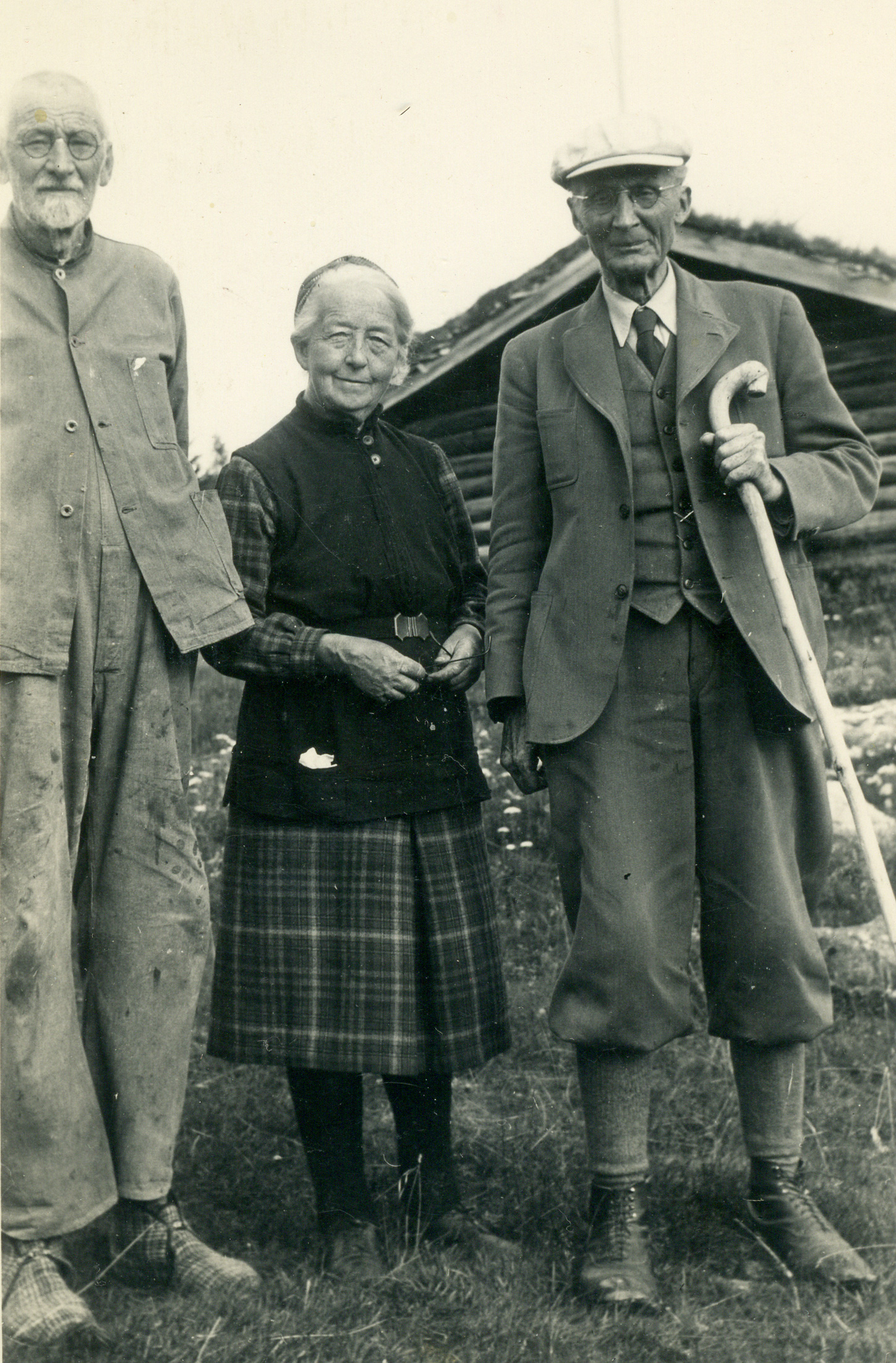
Kristine Bonnevie with her brothers-in-law Ernst Wilhelm Bjerknes (left) and Vilhelm Bjerknes at her cabin, Snefugl (snow bird), c. 1946.

She was the fifth of seven children born to Anne Johanne Daae (1839–1876) and her husband Jacob Aall Bonnevie (1838–1904), a member of the Norwegian parliament. She was baptized on 8 November 1872 at Vår Frue Church (Our Lady's Church) in Trondheim, part of the Church of Norway and previously Catholic. Anne died when Kristine was four, and Jacob married Susanne Byrne (1848–1927), having two more children (his eighth and ninth) with her. Kristine's half-brother from this second marriage was Carl Bonnevie, also a conservative member of Parliament and a peace activist. Kristine's family moved from Trondhjem to Kristiania in 1886.

Although her father was an educator, and in many respects a pioneer in that field, he generally opposed women's education, contending that girls should be educated at home in small groups organized by the mothers. There were also few options for educating girls in 19th-century Norway. Girls typically went to the equivalent of finishing schools that lacked academic focus. Despite her father's concern about women's education and her limited opportunities, both she and her older sister Honoria were able to attend a private school to prepare to pass a gymnasium exam, the European secondary system for academic education. She passed the exam and also her pre-graduate examen artium (simultaneously the final exam of Latin high school and the college entrance exam) with distinction in 1892.

== University education and doctoral work ==
In 1884, Norway became the last Scandinavian country to admit women to universities. She entered the University of Kristiania (now the University of Oslo) as a medical student in 1892. She began her studies in medicine, a field to which most women were encouraged out of the belief that they were good caretakers. Medicine didn't suit her, but Zoology was part of preclinical medical training, so she soon switched to it, studying under professors Johan Hjort and Georg Ossian Sars. Sars was the brother of historian Ernst Sars, with whom he shared a house, and she attended salons at their home discussing ideas such as John Stuart Mill's The Subjection of Women (1869), arguing that the "subordination of one sex to the other" is "wrong in itself, and now one of the chief hindrances to human improvement." She was so well received by these scholars that eventually they gave her a research stipend that enabled her to quit teaching and focus on her studies.

She developed an expertise in marine biology, working on materials from the Norwegian North Sea expedition of 15 years prior. In 1898 she received a grant to study cytology at the University of Zürich with professor Arnold Lang. She felt thwarted in Zurich, however, when Lang or the team rejected her research proposals. Instead she applied for a position back in Norway, taking over a position professor Hjort relinquished as curator of the Zoological Museum at the University of Oslo, and for which professor Sars was the selector. To the surprise of many, even though she was one of two finalists with a highly qualified man who slightly surpassed her in education (Kristian Schreiner), Sars chose her. She succeeded Hjort as curator in 1900. Schreiner's dismay at the loss of the post would soon figure in the arc of her career.

She received another grant to study with German embryologist Theodor Boveri at the University of Würzburg, focusing on cytology and cell biology, and she went there in 1900, just two months after her appointment as curator. Her research considered meiosis in different species of invertebrates that included the intestinal roundworm Ascaris lumbricoides, and she discovered an anomalous model that differed from the assumed universal process in cell division. This research became the basis of her 1906 doctoral dissertation, "Undersøgelser over kimcellerne hos Enteroxenos østergreni" (studies on the germ cells of Enteroxenos østergreni). Upon graduation, she was the second woman to earn a doctorate at a Norwegian university, and the first in science.

She spent two postdoctoral semesters at Columbia University from 1906 to 1907, studying with zoologist and embryologist Edmund B. Wilson, analyzing sex chromosomes. In June 1907 Schreiner published a paper arguing that the discovery upon which she had based her entire dissertation was invalid. She worried that he was out to "demolish her," but few understood the argument well enough to engage it, and eventually the controversy blew over.

== Academic career ==
At the time, Norwegian law prohibited women from holding state-funded faculty positions, but she applied for and received a privately funded "extraordinary" (outside of the standard faculty) professorship in zoology at the University of Bergen in 1910. Her colleagues Sars and Robert Collett lobbied for that position, along with Haaken Hasberg Gran, and later influenced Parliament to pass the "Lex Bonnevie" on 9 February 1912. This act granted women the same right as men to hold positions as professors at Norwegian universities. In 1912 Bonnevie became the first female professor in Norway, initially as extraordinary professor, but from 1919 on as full professor. She was a professor at Royal Frederick University from 1912 to 1937.

In 1914, Bonnevie began researching genetics and hereditary abnormalities. She was especially interested in whether twin births could be hereditary. She told an interviewer at Barnard College that Norway was a good place to study human heredity, because at that time its people live in isolated communities. She cited inbreeding among families that could be traced back hundreds of years.

In a rundown of discoveries and contributions, she proved polydactyly had a clear hereditary component. She also studied fingerprints to see if they had some hereditary components, with an early interest in paternity cases. She later researched a possible connection between fingerprints and mental capabilities - a popular idea during an era when eugenics controversies were active. Her results showed no relation between fingerprints and IQ. Finally, she studied a genetic dysfunction in mice that made them twitch, proving it was hereditary and caused by the accumulation of water in the brain.

Even after her retirement in 1937, she kept conducting research. Her last article was accepted for publication the day before she died in 1948, at 76 years old. This article is still cited.

Between 1922 and 1933, Bonnevie contributed to the Committee on Intellectual Cooperation of the League of Nations (with Henri Bergson, Albert Einstein, Marie Curie and others).

== Student welfare ==
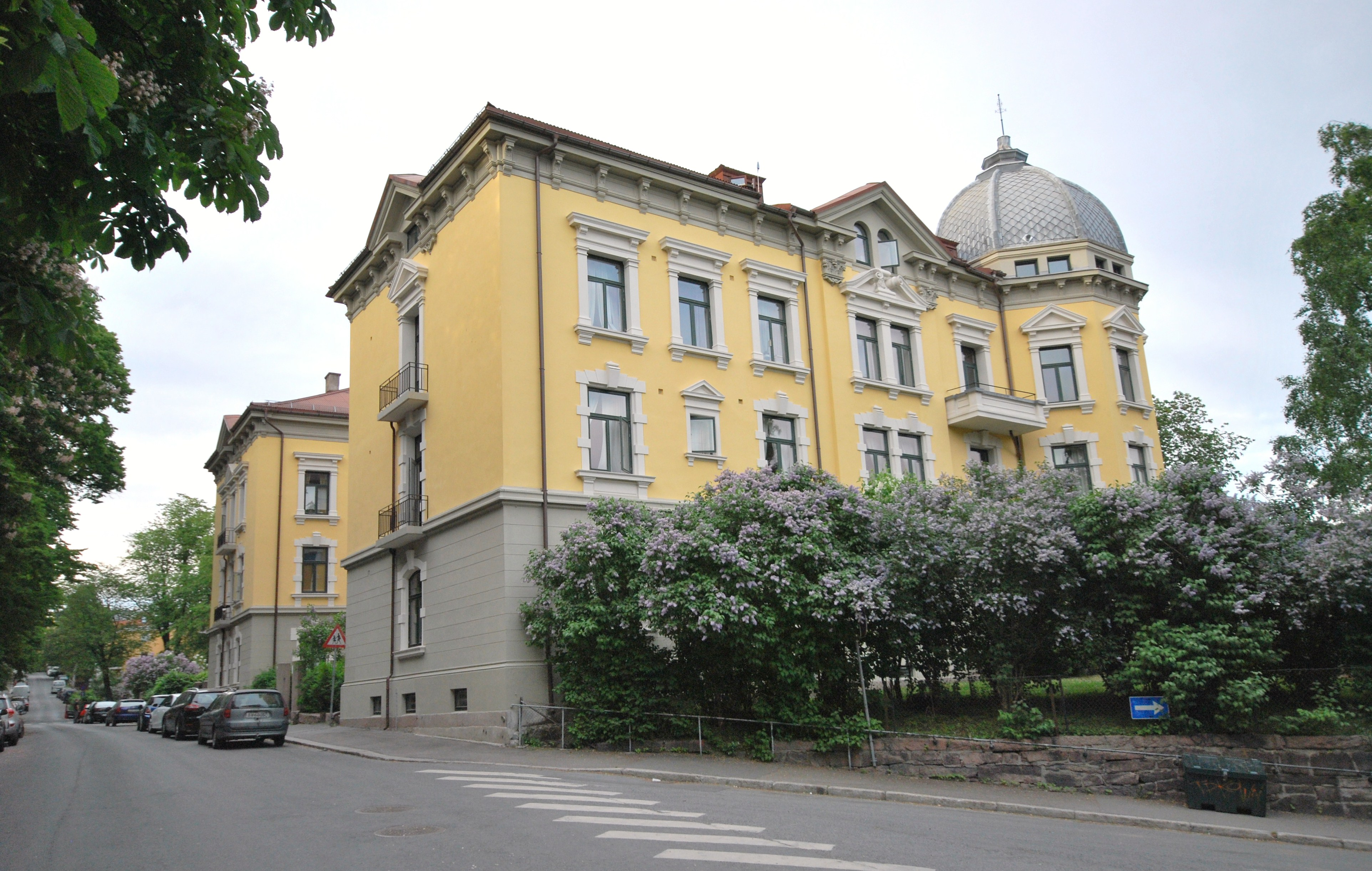
Geitmyrsveien, study house for girls, established by Bonnevie in 1916 (Oslo)

Kristine Bonnevie never had children of her own, but she cared a great deal about student welfare. She was also interested in supporting young female scientists. She was a founder of the student canteens Aulakjelleren and Blindernkjelleren at the University of Oslo. Thanks to her support, beginning in 1916 the university created several residences for female students in Oslo. Some years later, in 1920, she became a founder of the Association of University Women, and she was its first president. As president she hosted the Third International Congress of the Federation of University Women, held in 1924 in Oslo.

During World War I, she offered food and shelter to students from other parts of Norway. She even rented fields to grow vegetables, and she distributed food from her apartment to students after the Nazis closed the university in 1943. Both had been caught up in the racist aspects of eugenics, and her earlier professional rival Kristian Schreiner suffered for not cooperating with Nazis. He was imprisoned in the Grini concentration camp from 1941 to 1942.

== Taxonomy ==
Bonnevie discovered and classified new species of animals such as Enteroxenos oestergreni (fam. Eulimidae), Thuiaria articulata (fam. Sertulariidae) and Ciona gelatinosa (fam. Cionidae). She also wrote the original description of genus as Enteroxenos and Eupterotrachea.

== Politics ==
Kristine Bonnevie served as a central board member of the Free-minded Liberal Party from 1909 to 1918. She was elected to the Kristiania city council, serving from 1908 to 1919, and as a deputy representative to the Parliament of Norway in 1915. She served the 1916–1918 term as deputy to Otto Bahr Halvorsen in the constituency Gamle Aker.

She was a member of the Norwegian Association for Women's Rights, where her sister-in-law, Margarete Bonnevie, led from 1936.

She established the Institutt for arvelighetsforskning in 1916, intending it to serve as a scientific counterbalance to the Den konsultative norske komité for rasehygiene, which had been founded in 1908 by John Alfred Mjøen. She was against Race Eugenics and National Socialism.

She is recognized as one of Norway's most important women for her efforts in helping Jews escape to Sweden during World War II.

== Legacy ==
- In 1911, Bonnevie became the first female member of the Norwegian Academy of Science and Letters.
- She established a study home for young girls in 1916 and a students' house in 1923. Bonnevie was a member of the University's broadcasting committee from 1927 to 1937. Her students included Thordar Quelprud and Thor Heyerdahl.
- In 1916 she founded the Institute of Inheritance Research, later known as the Institute of Genetics. She was a director and professor until her retirement in 1937.
- The biology building on Blindern at the University of Oslo is named after her (Norwegian: Kristine Bonnevies hus, lit. 'Kristine Bonnevie's house').
- A research vessel belonging to the Norwegian Institute of Marine Research is named FF "Kristine Bonnevie", due to her interest in marine biology.
- In 1910 she was the first woman allowed on a dissertation committee, serving as an external examiner when Hjalmar Broth defended on arctic hydroids. He named the hydroid Bonneviella grandis after her.
- In 1920 she received the Gold King's Medal of Merit, the Order of St. Olav, 1st class, in 1946, and the Fridtjof Nansen Prize for Outstanding Research in 1935.
- From 1922 to 1925 she led the Norwegian Association for Female Academics, which she founded.
- Oslo, Stavanger, and Sola have streets named after her.

== See also ==
- Timeline of women in science
