= Andreas Bonnevie =

Norwegian priest and politician

Andreas Bonnevie (6 March 1782 – 10 April 1833) was a Norwegian priest and politician.

He was born in Mandal as the son of physician Honoratus Bonnevie and his second wife Kathrine Tørrisdatter. His grandfather had migrated to Norway from Antibes, France.

After private tutoring by bishop Christian Sørensen and attending school in Christianssand, he enrolled at the University of Copenhagen in 1797, graduating with the cand.theol. degree in 1804. He was appointed as vicar in Kalundborg in 1814, but after the events of Norway in 1814 he returned home and became vicar at Kongsberg Church instead. He was staunchly anti-Swedish, and regretted that Norway drifted from Denmark politically. He was elected to the Norwegian Parliament in 1815, representing his city, but served only one term. From 1824 to his death he served as vicar at Øyestad Church. He also published a number of poems.

From 1815 to his death, Bonnevie was married to Marie Berg.
