= Jacob Aall Bonnevie =

Norwegian educator and politician (1838–1904)

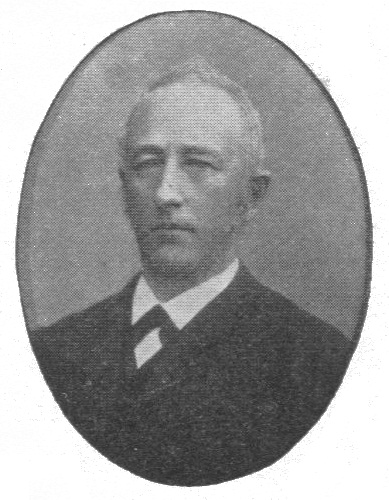
Jacob Aall Bonnevie ca. 1889

Jacob Aall Bonnevie (31 December 1838 – 13 August 1904) was a Norwegian educator, school director and text book author. He served as a member of the Norwegian Parliament for the Conservative Party.

== Biography ==
Bonnevie was born in Christiania (now Oslo), Norway. He was the son of Honoratus Bonnevie (1797–1848) and Sophie Augusta Baumann (1804–95). His father would later become mayor of the city.

Bonnevie graduated in 1856, then studied science at the University of Christiania becoming cand.real. in 1863. After finishing his education, he started teaching at Christiania Cathedral School from 1862. In 1865, he transferred to Kristiansand Cathedral School. In 1872, at the age of 34, Bonnevie was appointed school superintendent of Trondheim school district, an office he held until 1894. As a school director he was a reformer, particularly promoting the role of sciences in the Norwegian school system. He also wrote much-used text books on geometry and algebra.

Bonnevie was also active in national politics, where he was the Conservative Party's foremost spokesman on educational issues. He was elected to the parliament six times, and sat in the period from 1880 to 1897. Bonnevie represented Trondhjem og Levanger between 1880 and 1891. He served as a representative of Fredrikstad from 1892 to 1894 and Nedenes amt from 1895 to 1897. In 1889, Bonnevie was appointed Minister of Education and Church Affairs in the first cabinet of Prime Minister Emil Stang, which lasted until 1891. Later, in 1895, he was himself asked to form a coalition government, but the negotiations failed.

== Personal life ==
Bonnevie was married twice. In 1863, he married Anne Johanne Daae (1839-1876). They were the parents of seven children born between 1864 and 1876. Following the death of his first wife, he was married during 1878 to Susanne Bryn (1848-1927) with whom he had two children born between 1879 and 1881. His eldest daughter Sofie Honoria Bonnevie (1864–1928) married physicist and meteorologist Vilhelm Bjerknes (1862–1951). He was also the father of physician Kristine Bonnevie (1872-1948), Supreme Court justice Thomas Bonnevie (1879-1960) and jurist Carl Bonnevie (1881-1972). Bonnevie died in 1904, while attending a school conference in Linköping, Sweden.

== Selected works ==
- Kortfattet Lærebog i Geometri, 1870
- Kortfattet Lærebog i Arithmetik og Algebra, 1871
- Historisk lærebog for folkeskolen (with A. Ræder), 1894

Political offices
Preceded by Jakob Sverdrup	Minister of Education and Church Affairs; 1889–1891 0	Succeeded by Vilhelm Andreas Wexelsen
