= Stabel =

Stabel is a surname which is commonly seen in Norway. It may refer to:

- Carl Ludovico Stabel (1912–1988), Norwegian civil servant and judge
- Fredrik Stabel (1914–2001), Norwegian illustrator and writer
- Hans Jacob Stabel (1769–1836), Norwegian priest
- Ingse Stabel (born 1946), Norwegian judge
- Melanie Stabel (born 1999), German deaf sport shooter
- Pierre Jean Van Stabel (1744–1797), French naval officer
