= Danish Ministry of Culture's Children's Book Award =

The Ministry of Culture's Children Book Award (Danish: Kulturministeriets Forfatterpris for Børne- og Ungdomsbøger, or simply Kulturministeriets Børnebogspris) is an award given in order to honor a special effort for a Danish children's or youth book of high artistic quality. The award can be given either for a single title or for a whole work of an author. Along with the honor follows DKK 30,000, which partially comes from the "tipsmidler", money onwed by the Danish gambling organization Danske Spil, as it is customary in Denmark for 66.44% of the money from gambling in games like lottery go towards cultural work and various kinds of charities. In 2011 the "tipsmidler" gave a 1.5 billion Danish kroner profit which the government ministries must give to charitable purposes.

== Recipients of the award ==
- 1954 – Egon Mathiesen: Mis med de blå øjne (Cat with blue eyes) and Alfred Johansen: Den grønne flaske (The green bottle)
- 1956 – Poul Jeppesen: Henrik
- 1957 – Palle Lauring: Stendolken (The stone dagger)
- 1958 – Estrid Ott: Chico's lange vandring (Chico's long march)
- 1959 – Tove Ditlevsen: Annelise – tretten år (Annelise – Thirteen years old)
- 1960 – Karen Plovgaard: Sanne Karen Herold Olsen: Afrika (Africa)
- 1961 – Poul E. Knudsen: Væddemålet og Arne Ungermann: Da solen blev forkølet (When the sun caught a cold)
- 1962 – Thøger Birkeland: Når hanen galer (When the cock crows)
- 1963 – Valborg Bjerge Hansen: Helle – ikke som de andre (Helle – not like the others), Marlie Brande: Da skoene løb med Laura (When the shoes ran with Laura) and Ib Spang Olsen: Drengen i månen (The boy in the moon)
- 1964 – Ib Spang Olsen: Det lille lokomotiv (The Little Engine), Blæsten (The wind) and Regnen (The rain) and Mona and Peter Chr. Pedersen: Israel
- 1965 – Halfdan Rasmussen: Børnerim (Nursery rhymes)
- 1967 – Jan Møller: Borger i det gamle København (Citizen of the old Copenhagen) and Ib Spang Olsen: Mosekonens bryg (Marsh Woman's brewery)
- 1968 – Cecil Bødker: Silas og den sorte hoppe (Silas and the black mare)
- 1969 – Ole Lund Kirkegaard: Albert
- 1970 – Erik Chr. Haugaard: De små fisk (The small fish)
- 1971 – Benny Andersen: Snøvsen på sommerferie (Snøvsen on summer vacation)
- 1972 – Per Holm Knudsen: Sådan får man et barn (This is how you get a child) and Niels Jensen: Da landet lå øde (When the country was deserted)
- 1973 – Merete Kruuse: Rode-Rikke (Rooting-Rikke)
- 1974 – Palle Petersen: 50 år i jernet (50 years in the iron)
- 1975 – Inge Krog: Hjemmefra (Away from home)
- 1976 – Leif Esper Andersen: Fremmed (Stranger)
- 1977 – Bjarne Reuter: En dag i Hector Hansens liv (A day in Hector Hansen's life)
- 1978 – Bent Haller: Indianeren (The Indian)
- 1979 – Franz Berliner: Ulven som jager alene (The wolf who hunts alone) and Hævneren (Avenger)
- 1980 – Lars-Henrik Olsen: Ræven i skoven (The fox in the woods)
- 1981 – John Nehm: Stemplerne (The pistons) and Torben Weinreich: Manden i vinduet (The man in the window)
- 1982 – Kirsten Holst: Også om mange år (Also for many years)
- 1983 – Iris Garnov: Ud i det blå (Out in the blue) and Vinterøen (Winter island)
- 1984 – Gerd Rindel: Øretævens vej, Slagsmål og silkebånd og Brændevin og vokseværk
- 1985 – Peter Mouritzen: Haltefanden og Knud Erik Pedersen: Esben, Esben og Jakob and Esbens hemmelighed
- 1986 – Søren Vagn Jacobsen: Krabbetågen
- 1987 – Josefine Ottesen: Eventyret om fjeren og rosen
- 1988 – Bent Rasmussen: Bitte Bødvar og banen
- 1989 – Louis Jensen: Krystalmanden, Tusindfuglen, Hjerterejsen, Det grønne spor and Drageflyverne
- 1990 – Kim Fupz Aakeson: Dengang min onkel Kulle blev skør and Stor og stærk
- 1991 – Thomas Winding: Min lille hund Mester and Mester, min lille hund i natten
- 1992 – Jens Peder Larsen: Brønden
- 1993 – Lotte Inuk: Gina og Gina je t'aime
- 1994 – Anders Johansen: Kærlighedens labyrint
- 1995 – Bodil Bredsdorff: Krageungen, Eidi, Tink og Alek
- 1996 – Dorte Karrebæk: Pigen der var go' til mange ting
- 1997 – Cecilie Eken: Sikkas fortælling
- 1998 – Wivi Leth: Engle græder ikke
- 1999 – Martin Petersen: Med ilden i ryggen
- 2000 – Kåre Bluitgen: Niels Klims forunderlige rejse 1–4
- 2001 – Janne Teller: Intet
- 2002 – Bente Clod: Englekraft, I vilden sky og Himmelfald
- 2003 – Kamilla Hega Holst: Den sovende sangerinde
- 2004 – Daniel Zimakoff: En dødssyg ven
- 2005 – Birgit Strandbygaard: Drengen der samlede på ord
- 2006 – Charlotte Blay: Skrællingen – Tora i vinland
- 2007 – Cecilie Eken: Mørkebarnet
- 2008 – Josefine Ottesen: Golak
- 2009 – Anita Krumbach: Et mærkeligt skib
- 2010 – Jesper Wung-Sung: Kopierne
- 2011 – Kim Fupz Aakeson: Jeg begyndte sådan set bare at gå
- 2012 – Ronnie Andersen: Komatøs
- 2013 – Sanne Munk Jensen og Glenn Ringtved: Dig og mig ved daggry
- 2014 – Mette Hegnhøj: Ella er mit navn vil du købe det?
- 2015 – Mette Eike Neerlin: Hest, hest, tiger, tiger
- 2016 – Hanne Kvist: Dyr med pels - og uden
- 2017 – Mette Vedsø: Hest Horse pferd cheval love
- 2018 – Jesper Wung-Sung: Aben og gabestokken
- 2019 – Kathrine Assels: Mester Ester
- 2020 – Adam O.: Den rustne verden. 3. del: Ukrudt
- 2021 – Tina Sakura: Bjørnen
- 2022 – Vilma Sandnes Johansson: Tænk ikke på mig
- 2023 – Hanne Dagmar Raaberg: Papirhjerter
