= Gender Equality and Anti-Discrimination Ombud =

Norwegian ombudsman for gender equality and anti-discrimination

- Likestillings- og diskrimineringsombudet (LDO)
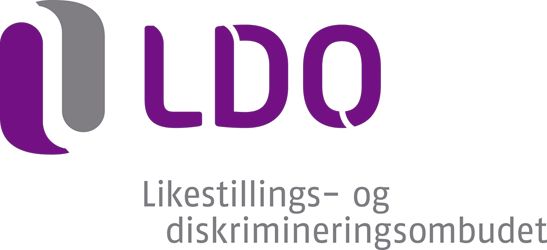

Ombudsman overview
- Formed: January 1, 2006
- Jurisdiction: Norway
- Headquarters: Mariboes gate 13, Oslo
- Employees: 37 (2018)
- Ombudsman executive: Hanne Bjurstrøm, Ombudsman
- Website: www.LDO.no

The Gender Equality and Anti-Discrimination Ombud (Norwegian: Likestillings- og diskrimineringsombudet) is a Norwegian ombudsman for gender equality and anti-discrimination, and is appointed for a term of six years by the King-in-Council, in effect by the Government of Norway. The ombudsman heads the similarly named government agency.

The office was established by the Norwegian government in 2006 as the successor of the Gender Equality Ombud (established 1978), the Centre for Gender Equality (established 1997) and the Centre Against Ethnic Discrimination (established 1998). The Centre for Gender Equality was itself a continuation of the Council for Gender Equality, established as a public body in 1972 on the proposal of the Norwegian Association for Women's Rights (NKF). Former NKF President Eva Kolstad was appointed as the first Gender Equality Ombud in 1978, becoming the first person worldwide to hold such a role.

The current ombudsman is Hanne Bjurstrøm, a lawyer, former cabinet minister for the Labour Party and former special adviser in the Ministry of the Environment. The agency had 63 employees as of 2014.

== Ombudsmen ==
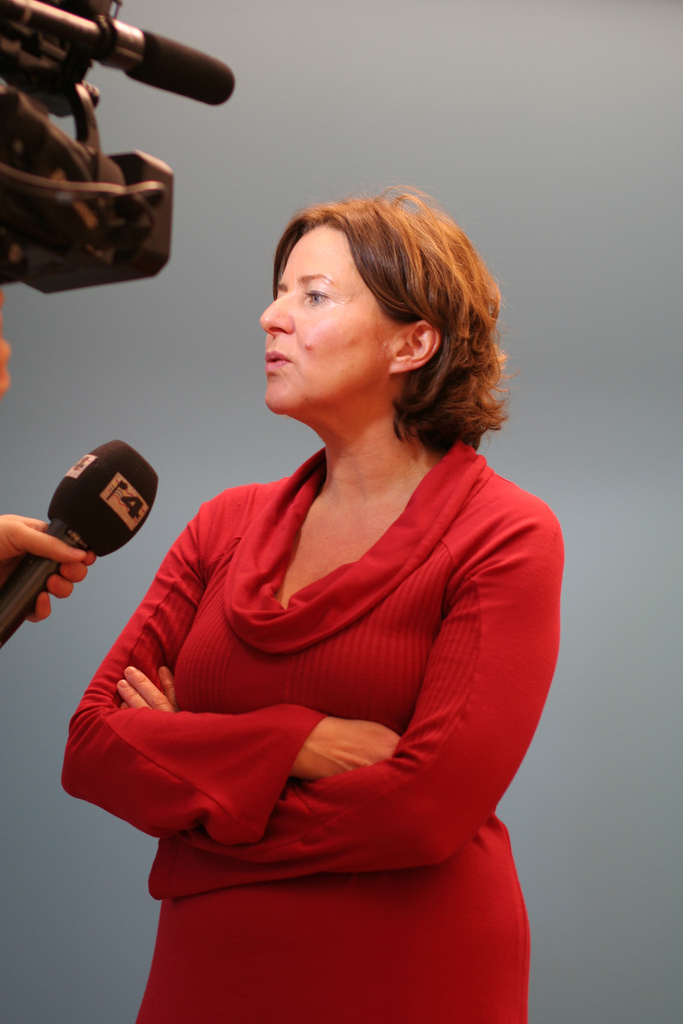
Hanne Bjurstrøm

Gender Equality Ombudsmen

- Eva Kolstad (1979–1988)
- Sigrun Hoel (acting, 1984 and 1991)
- Ingse Stabel (1988–1994)
- Anne Lise Ryel (1994–2000)
- Kristin Mile (2000–2005)

Gender Equality and Anti-Discrimination Ombudsmen

- Beate Gangås (2006–2010)
- Sunniva Ørstavik (2010–2016)
- Hanne Bjurstrøm (2016–)
