= Per Knudsen =

Per Knudsen may refer to:

- Per Knudsen (Danish footballer) (1925–1999), Danish defender
- Per Knudsen (Norwegian footballer) (1930–2006), Norwegian striker
- Per Knudsen (jurist) (1949–2005), Norwegian civil servant
- Per Holm Knudsen (born 1945), Danish author of The True Story of How Babies Are Made
