= Hanne Bjurstrøm =

Norwegian lawyer and politician

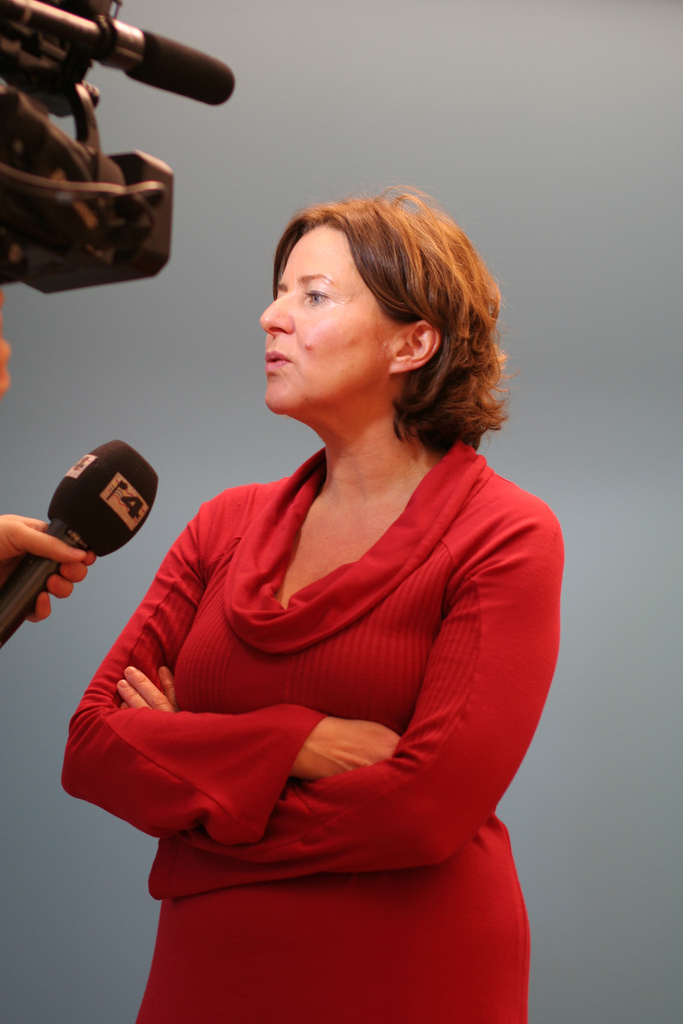

Ombudsman of the Gender Equality and Anti-Discrimination Ombud
- In office 18 January 2016 – 28 February 2022
- Preceded by: Sunniva Ørstavik
- Succeeded by: Bjørn Erik Thon

Minister of Labour and Social Inclusion
- In office 21 December 2009 – 21 September 2012
- Prime Minister: Jens Stoltenberg
- Preceded by: Dag Terje Andersen
- Succeeded by: Anniken Huitfeldt

Personal details
- Born: 20 September 1960 (age 65) Oslo, Norway
- Party: Labour
- Occupation: Judge; Politician; Lawyer

Hanne Bjurstrøm (born 20 September 1960) is a Norwegian lawyer and politician representing the Labour Party, who served as Gender Equality and Anti-Discrimination Ombud from 2016 to 2022. She previously served as Minister of Labour and Social Inclusion in Stoltenberg's Second Cabinet from 2009 to 2012. In 2021 she became vice president of the Labour Court of Norway.

== Career ==
Prior to entering the cabinet, she was a special adviser in the Ministry of Climate and Environment and served as the Norwegian chief negotiator at the United Nations Climate Change Conference in 2009. She has formerly also worked at the Ministry of Justice and Public Security and the Office of the Attorney General of Norway, and as a corporate lawyer. After leaving the cabinet, she became a partner in the corporate law firm Arntzen de Besche.

=== Minister of Labour and Social Inclusion ===
Rigmor Aasrud acted as minister of labour from when Stoltenberg reshuffled his cabinet on 20 October 2009, until Bjurstrøm assumed office on 21 December.

=== Ombudsman of Gender Equality and Anti-discrimination ===
She was appointed by the King-in-Council as Gender Equality and Anti-Discrimination Ombud on 23 October 2015 and took office on 18 January 2016.
