= Per Knudsen (jurist) =

Norwegian civil servant (1949–2005)

Per Knudsen (9 October 1949 – 16 January 2005) was a Norwegian civil servant.

He was born in Oslo and took the cand.jur. degree in 1975. He started working in the National Insurance Administration before graduating, and was promoted to head of department in 1987. From 1997 to 2000 he was assisting director of the institution. On 1 October 2001 he became director of the National Insurance Court, having received the appointment on 18 May 2001. He remained here until he suddenly died in January 2005. He was succeeded by Jon Evang as acting director, then by Knut Brofoss on a permanent basis from September 2005.

Preceded by Ole-Erik Øie (acting)	Director of the National Insurance Court; 2001–2005	Succeeded by Jon Evang (acting)
