= Women to the Top =

Women to the Top (W2T) was a European project for bringing more women into top management. It was funded by the European Commission and ran 2003-2005 in Estonia, Denmark, Greece and Sweden, culminating in a transnational conference in Stockholm, 24–25 January 2005. The total budget was 5.6 million SEK (half a million euros). The project was directed toward private and public employers.

The final report of Women to the Top, and a summary of the final report, are available online and an article was published discussing the results: Eriksson-Zetterquist, Ulla; Styhre, Alexander (2007). "Overcoming the Glass Barriers: Reflection and Action in the 'Women to the Top' Programme". Gender, Work & Organization. 15 (2). Blackwell Publishing: 133–160. doi:10.1111/j.1468-0432.2007.00366.x.

== Estonia ==
In Estonia, Tiina Raitviir surveyed female executives from Estonia's Top500 companies. One hundred women managers were identified as the basis for an informal network and a mentorship program. Eighty women managers participated in an initial seminar. Nine women followed up in subsequent workshops. All of the companies were foreign owned because it was believed they would be more willing to participate in the project than Estonian companies.

== Denmark ==
Fifty-one potential top managers attended interdisciplinary networks hosted by CeLi and two trade unions, the Danish Society of Engineers (IDA) and the Danish Association of Lawyers and Economists (DJØF). These women formed professional networks for Women in Top Management, Women in Human Resource Management and Women in Project Management. They attended seminars and a national conference. In addition, four recruitment firms were involved in a focus group to develop gender recommendations for consultants and managers.

== Greece ==
In Greece, the project worked with The Research Centre for Gender Equality (KETHI). Thirty women attended counselling on entrepreneurship for women who wanted to start their own businesses. Seven more women attended vocational workshops at the organisations Amel, Elgeka and the Municipality of Athens. Members from ten recruitment companies took part in seminars and research on gender inequality and leadership. A survey was carried out to learn more about gender and employment.

== Sweden ==
In Sweden the project was administered by the Ombudsman for Equal Opportunities (Jämo) with Marie Trollvik as project leader. Fifteen major Swedish companies were involved, both public and private, and set up networks and a mentorship program. The project was evaluated by Jämo and the School of Business, Economics and Law at the University of Gothenburg.
