= Ikke =

Ikke may refer to:

- Ikke Bødlen, poem by Halfdan Rasmussen
- Ikke Pe Ikka, 1994 film directed by Raj N. Sippy
