= Kristin Mile =

Kristin Mile (born 11 April 1956) is a Norwegian lawyer, civil servant and former secretary-general of the Norwegian Humanist Association.

She graduated as cand.jur. in 1983 and worked for the Directorate of the Norwegian Labour Inspection Authority and the Norwegian Directorate of Immigration before being hired by the Norwegian Gender Equality Ombud in 1995. She headed this organization from 2000 to 2005, and in 2006 she took over as secretary-general in the Norwegian Humanist Association after Lars Gule, retiring in 2018. She held the position till 2018.

Civic offices
Preceded by Anne Lise Ryel	Norwegian Gender Equality Ombud; 2000–2005	Succeeded by Beate Gangås
Preceded by Lars Gule	General secretary for the Norwegian Humanist Association; 2006–2018	Succeeded by Trond Enger
