= Ingse Stabel =

Norwegian judge

Norwegian Gender Equality Ombud
- In office 1988–1994
- Preceded by: Eva Kolstad
- Succeeded by: Anne Lise Ryel

Inger-Else "Ingse" Stabel (born 14 December 1946) is a Norwegian judge.

She was born in Oslo as a daughter of Supreme Court Justice Carl Ludovico Stabel (1912–1988) and Karen Andrea Elisabeth Eide (1914–2001). She is a niece of Fredrik Stabel. She family moved from Tøyen to Bygdøy when Stabel was 8 years old, and she finished her secondary education at Oslo Cathedral School in 1965. In 1971 she graduated with the cand.jur. degree from the University of Oslo. Between March 1970 and 1985 she was married to Jo Piene; she is now married to Knut Brofoss, a son of Erik Brofoss.

She started working in the Ministry of Justice and the Police in 1971. She was promoted gradually to assistant secretary in 1978, and from 1983 to 1986 she was a legal adviser. She was an acting presiding judge in Eidsivating Court of Appeal for a brief period in 1986, before working in the Office of the Attorney General of Norway from 1986 to 1988. She was also a member of the National Committee for Medical and Health Research Ethics from 1981 to 1993.

In 1988 she left this position to become Norwegian Gender Equality Ombud. She served one six-year term. She made a mark by supporting gender quotas.

In 1994 she was appointed as presiding judge in Eidsivating Court of Appeal. After the Borgarting Court of Appeal was split from Eidsivating in 1995, Stabel worked in Borgarting. Also, from 1994 to 1997 she was a judge in the Labour Court of Norway, later serving as a deputy until 2002. She was also a member of the Lund Commission from 1994 to 1996, chaired the committees that delivered the Norwegian Official Reports 2001:14 and 2000:11, and was a committee member for the Norwegian Official Report 1991:6.

She chaired the National Insurance Court from 1997 to 2001, and has been a Supreme Court Justice from 2001 to her retirement at age 70.

Civic offices
Preceded by Eva Kolstad	Norwegian Gender Equality Ombud; 1988–1994	Succeeded by Anne Lise Ryel
