= Lars Gule =

Norwegian philosopher

Associate Professor Lars Gule
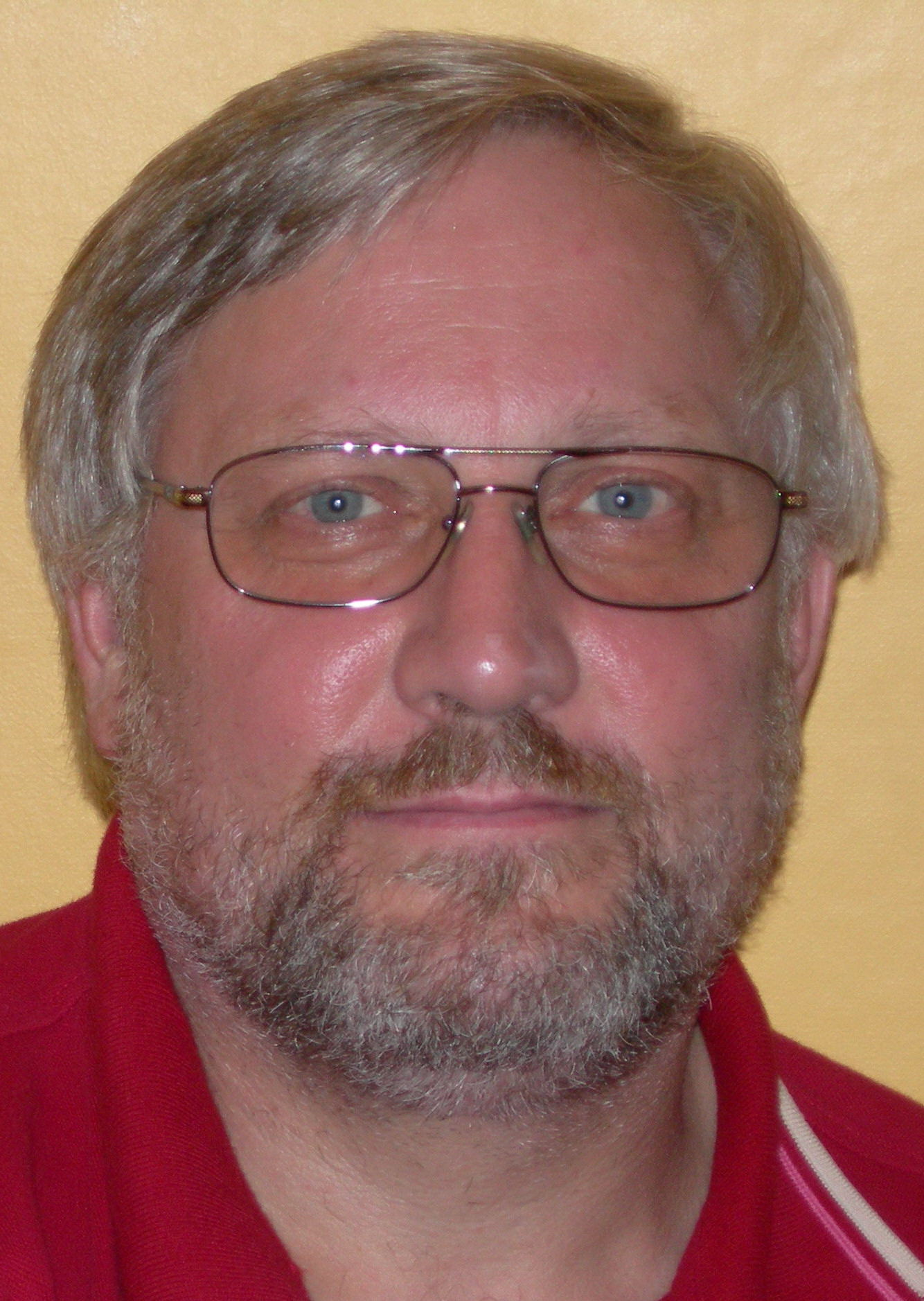
- Born: 24 June 1955 (age 71); Oslo, Norway
- Education: University of Bergen
- Employer: Oslo and Akershus University College (HiOA)
- Known for: Social commentator, anti-Israel activist
- Awards: HiOA Communicator of the Year, 2015

Lars Gule (born 24 June 1955) is a Norwegian philosopher. He has graduated with a doctorate in philosophy, and is an associate professor (at Oslo Metropolitan University). From 2000 to 2005 he was secretary general of the Norwegian Humanist Association. Gule became known to the general public in 1977 when after having joined the DFLP group, Gule was arrested in Beirut, Lebanon with Semtex in his luggage intended for Israeli targets leading to a six-month conviction and subsequent deportation. He remains active as an anti-Israel activist. Gule is often used by Norwegian media as an authority on questions regarding the Middle East, Islam and extremism.

== Education and professional life ==
Lars Gule studied history, philosophy and social science at the University of Bergen and received his doctoral degree in philosophy (doctor artium) at the same university in 2003 when he defended the dissertation Social Development and Political Progress in Two Traditions A Conceptual and Comparative Analysis of Western and Arab-Islamic Ideas of Social and Political Change and Improvement.

In 1987 he administered the Middle Eastern Languages and Culture subject as well as The Centre for the Study of the Sciences and the Humanities, both at the University of Bergen. In 1989, he was associated with the Chr. Michelsen Institute (CMI) human rights programme as a PhD student and administrator. He later returned to the University of Bergen (Centre for Development Studies) as coordinator of the research programme Nature, Society and Water (1998–2000).

From July 2000 to December 2005 he was secretary general of the Norwegian Humanist Association (see below). From February 2006 he was Programme Director at the Center for Multicultural and International Work (Sefia) (discontinued) at Oslo University College, and in August 2007 he moved to a position as associate professor (following the closure of Sefia) related to the fields of multicultural understanding and development studies at the Department of Education and International Studies, Oslo and Akershus University College. From January 2009, the Gule was also associated with HiO's (from 1 August 2011 HiOA's) Centre for the Study of Professions (SPS) in a 50% position as a post doctor. From January 2010 he became a full-time post doctor research fellow at the SPS and worked, inter alia, with professional practice in multicultural society. The post doctor fellowship ended in August 2013. From November the same year he obtained a full-time position as associate professor at the same university college, now a full university OsloMet, continuing to work on multicultural issues. However, Gule's research interests have moved in the direction of extremism after the terrorist attacks in Oslo and at Utøya on 22 July 2011, and from the fall semester of 2015 he is contributing to the teaching of a 15 ECT credit course called "Knowledge on Extremism and Radicalisation" (in Norwegian).

== Travel to Lebanon and prison ==
In January 1977 Gule travelled from Norway on a trip that was supposed to take him through much of the Middle East. The first goal was Lebanon, where most people believed the situation was beginning to normalize after one and half years of civil war. Gule sympathised with the Palestinian cause and became involved in the Democratic Front for the Liberation of Palestine (DFLP), a Palestinian political party and terror group. Gule has denied that it was his intention to participate in terrorism and describes his involvement as part of the "anti-imperialist" struggle.

The DFLP asked Gule to carry out an armed operation in Israel in early June 1977. Gule has explained that the DFLP proposed three targets for him: a bomb could be placed either be in a pedestrian underpass in Tel Aviv, in the President Hotel in Jerusalem or outside an apartment complex with gas containers outside in what was referred to as a "bourgeois neighbourhood"." Gule has argued that he rejected these targets as he was sceptical of what could be regarded as terrorism. "The suspect had made it known to his employers that he did not want to take human life. The purpose of the explosion was to mark the 10th anniversary of the war in 1967, strengthen the Palestinians' fighting spirit and morale", he said later during interrogation to the Norwegian police. He did not succeed in engaging the DFLP in a discussion on a more symbolic target. Khaled Nazzal was guidance officer for Gule. As it was not possible to travel directly from Lebanon to Israel, Gule was to travel back to Norway where he was to procure a new passport (without Arab visas) before he went on to Israel after a few weeks, during the time he would consider if he could participate in such an operation. He received a plane ticket to Europe and $1,300 (US) from the DFLP, to cover the other travel expenses.

At the security check in Beirut International Airport on 6 May when Gule was about to leave Lebanon, a security officers found approximately 750 grams of plastic explosives hidden in the covers of books Gule had in his backpack. He was eventually handed over to the Lebanese intelligence service and after harsh interrogations, Gule confessed to his cooperation with the DFLP. Gule has explained how he was exposed to torture, including being beaten under the soles of the feet and threatened with liquidation.

Gule was sentenced to six months prison in Lebanon and a fine for the "illegal possession of weapons" (i.e. explosives). He was acquitted of attempting to carry out terrorist acts using explosives.

The case attracted great attention in Norwegian media in the summer of 1977, and when Gule was released from prison and returned to Norway in November 1977, he was questioned by the Norwegian police. The attorney general, however, chose to react with a waiver, even though he repeated his statement about having begun what could be construed as planning a bombing in Israel.

== Secretary general of the Norwegian Humanist Association ==
Back in Norway Gule began studying history at the University of Bergen in 1978. Then, after completing an MA in philosophy, he administered the programme Middle Eastern Languages and Culture as well as The Centre for the Study of the Sciences and the Humanities, both at the University of Bergen. In 1989, he became associated with the Chr. Michelsen Institute Human Rights Programme as a PhD student. He later returned to the University of Bergen (Centre for Development Studies) as coordinator of the research programme Nature, Society and Water (1998–2000).

In 2000 Gule was appointed to secretary general of the Norwegian Humanist Association and started working there on 1 July. He served in this capacity until 9 December 2005. The immediate resignation came as a result of a disagreement with the executive board on an organizational questions. But his departure from the position only meant that his resignation from the fixed term of six years was advanced a few months.

Gule was till then the secretary general who had been in the position for the second longest time in the history of the Norwegian Humanist Association, 5 1/2 years. Gule emphasized the equality of all life stances – religious and secular – and promoted human rights during his period. He contributed frequently to the media and participated in public debate. He was often controversial, not least with his criticism of fundamentalist Islam. Yet he defended the religious freedom of Muslims and the right to be a Muslim in Norway. Controversial was his statements about faith communities' right to discriminate, including women and gays, because those who feel discriminated against have an exit option. This option dissolves the apparent contradiction between fundamental rights – religious freedom and the right not to be discriminated against. This is why the state should not intervene in the internal affairs of religious communities, in Gule's opinion.

In the work of a professional historian on the history of the Norwegian Humanist Association, Gule is considered a distinctive ideological leader of the organization. He also emphasized Gule's commitment to human rights during his period as secretary general.

In the 2000s, Gule was invited to a Humanist conference in the US, but was told by the embassy in Oslo that he would not be allowed to enter the country, due to his previous conviction in Lebanon. In January 2023, it became public knowledge that he is on the FBI's secret list of people who may not be on planes going to the United States, or flying over the country's territory. Lars Gule then stated that it has never been relevant for him to travel to the USA.

== Social commentator ==
As early as at high school in his home town Larvik in the early 1970s, Gule participated the public debate. For a period he was active in Sosialistisk Valgforbunds Ungdom (which later became the Socialist Youth) and Sosialistisk Valgforbund, later the Socialist Left Party (SV), but he was never a member of the Marxist–Leninist-Maoist SUF (m–l) (later Rød Ungdom) or Workers' Communist Party (Arbeidernes kommunistparti (AKP (m–l)).

Because of what Gule calls a radical anti-imperialist commitment, he became involved in the Palestinian struggle for liberation in 1977 and agreed to participate in an armed attack against Israel. This choice came after a long process that involved a break with a previous non-violent revolutionary position Gule had advocated, among other things, as a member of Folkereisning mot krig, the Norwegian branch of War Resisters International earlier in the 1970s. This happened because of a growing conviction that the imperialist and reactionary forces in the world could not be overthrown without the use of violence. The US-backed coup against Salvador Allende's government in the Chile in 1973, was highly important in this development.

When Gule began at the University of Bergen, he came in contact with a small but radical group that worked on the development of Karl Marx's theory of communism as a mode of production. Through this work Gule came to distance himself from Marxism as ideology and from "the left's romance with violence" (including a writing a self-criticism in Dagbladet in 1979). In the article "Some critical considerations of the Marxist class struggle theory", he delivered a theoretical critique of the Marxist theory of class struggle as a necessity for the Communist revolution.

He became a member of the social democratic Workers' Youth League, the Labour Party's student group, and was briefly leader of the organization at the University of Bergen (1984), but has not since been active in the Workers' Youth League (or Labour Party). He is currently a politically independent, though his social views and positions in the public debate places him on the "left".

The interest in the Middle East that was ignited during his stay in Lebanon in 1977 has followed Gule through his studies. His Master's degree in philosophy (1986) was entitled "Adlyd Gud og de med autoritet blant dere" (Obey God, and those with authority among you) and was a study of classical Islamic and modern Arab political thought. This led to an interest in Islam and human rights that Gule has pursued since. This is reflected in several articles and is also a central theme in his doctoral dissertation.

Gule often participates in the public debate through newspaper articles and online debates, where he is particularly critical of totalitarian ideologies and religions. Therefore, he supported Professor Bernt Hagtvet's criticism of Workers' Communist Party (Arbeidernes kommunistparti (AKP (m–l)) He is also frequently used as a commentator and debater on radio and television on matters related to the Middle East, Islam, religion and cultural conflicts. In the public debate as well as in his academic work, Gule tries to present a consistent defence of human rights.

Throughout his term as secretary general of the NHA, Gule also focused on the critique of religion. Although he also criticized Christianity, he has been a particularly critical of Islam. However, Gule rejects and is sharply criticizes what he perceives as a simplified, erroneous and / or exaggerated representations of a threat from Islam – Islamophobia.

Gule is still a strong critic of Israel, which he characterizes as a racist state. He also rejects that strong and fundamental criticism of Israel would be a form of antisemitism. He is currently involved in the Norwegian branch of the international BDS Movement and works for a boycott against Israel.

Since 2007, Gule has studied a legal process in which he argues that there has been a miscarriage of justice. The case is about a Bangladeshi man (and former colleague of Gule), who is alleged to have abused his Bangladeshi wife seriously, including by hanging her up by the feet, four times. In his book Den fjerde opphengingen. Beretningen om et varslet justismord og en profesjonsstudie av aktøransvar (The fourth suspension. The story of a miscarriage of justice foretold and a study of the actors's professional responsibility) from 2010, the investigation, the experts' statements, the sentences and the role of the press are all reviewed in detail.

After the terrorist attacks in Norway 22 July 2011, Gule has been interviewed and cited by both Norwegian and international media as a commentator on extremism, terrorism and multicultural issues, especially since he had "discussed" with Anders Behring Breivik on the website Document.no.

== Selected bibliography ==
- «Noen kritiske betraktninger over den marxistiske klassekampteorien», Ariadne 1, 1983
- «Islam og menneskerettighetene», Humanist, 2–88
- «Økologi og økonomi», i Gjerdåker, Gule and Hagtvet (eds.), Den uoverstigelige grense: tanke og handling i miljøkampen, 1991
- «Politivold, forskning og rettssikkerhet: noen vitenskapsteoretiske og forskningsetiske utdypninger», in: Lars Gule og Preben Falck (edd.), Politivold, forskning og rettssikkerhet: et menneskerettslig søkelys på politivoldskomplekset i Bergen, 1991
- «Islam and Democracy», Forum for Development Studies nr 2, 1992
- «Hvor går toleransens grenser?», Samtiden nr. 2, 1996
- «Trosfrihet i den muslimske verden», Mennesker og rettigheter, Nordic Journal for Human Rights, vol. 3, 2001
- Social Development and Political Progress in Two Traditions – A Comparative and Conceptual Analysis of Western and Arab-Islamic Ideas of Social and Political Improvement, 2003
- «Retten til å diskriminere», Samtiden nr. 3, 2003
- «Islam og religionskritikk». Forord til den norske utgaven av Ibn Warraq, Hvorfor jeg ikke er muslim, 2003
- «Betingelser og begrensninger for livssynsfrihet», Religion og livssyn, 3/04
- «Statens verdigrunnlag i et pluralistisk samfunn», in: Didrik Søderlind (ed.), Farvel til statskirken?, 2005
- Islam og det moderne, 2006
- «Niqabens paradoksale umulighet», MaiA 4 2006
- «Humanisme og islam», Religion og livssyn, 4/06
- «Islam og det moderne – en refleksjon», Minerva, Internet edition (17.09. 2007)
- «Religionskritikk og folkeskikk. Om begrepene respekt og toleranse», in: Didrik Søderlind (ed.), Verdier og verdighet. Tanker om det humanistiske livssyn, 2007
- «Sexsalg, sexkjøp og autonomi», in: Liv Jessen (ed.), Det ideelle offer. Andre tekster om prostitusjon, 2007
- «Profesjon og flerkulturalitet», in: Anders Molander and Lars Inge Terum (eds.), Profesjonsstudier, 2008
- Den fjerde opphengingen. Beretningen om et varslet justismord og en profesjonsstudie av aktøransvar, 2010
- Ekstremismens kjennetegn. Ansvar og motsvar, 2012
- «Ibn Khaldun - vitenskapen om sivilisasjonene», in Jørgen Pedersen (ed.), Politisk filosofi. Fra Platon til Hannah Arendt, 2013.
- «Venstreekstremisme og terrorisme», in: Øystein Sørensen, Bernt Hagtvet and Nik. Brandal (eds.), Venstreekstremisme. Ideer og bevegelser, 2013.
- "Ibn Khaldun – Law and Justice in the Science of Civilisation", in: Guttorm Fløistad (ed.), Philosophy of Justice. Springer Science+Business Media B.V., 2015
- «Hvorfor reiser nordmenn til Syria for å kjempe? - om norsk salafi-jihadisme», in: Øystein Sørensen, Bernt Hagtvet and Nik. Brandal (eds.), Islamisme: Ideologi og trussel, 2016).
- «Etiske utfordringer i ekstremismeforskningen i Norge», i Vidar Enebakk, Helene Ingierd and Nils Olav Refsdal (eds.), De berørte etter 22. juli. Forskningsetiske perspektiver, 2016.
- "Hate and Identity. A social philosophical attempt to understand extremism", FLEKS - Scandinavian Journal of Intercultural Theory and Practice, 6(1), 5-23. https://doi.org/10.7577/fleks.3307

Preceded by Tove Beate Pedersen	Secretary General of the Norwegian Humanist Association; 2000–2005	Succeeded by Kristin Mile
