= Halfdan Rasmussen =

Danish writer (1915–2002)

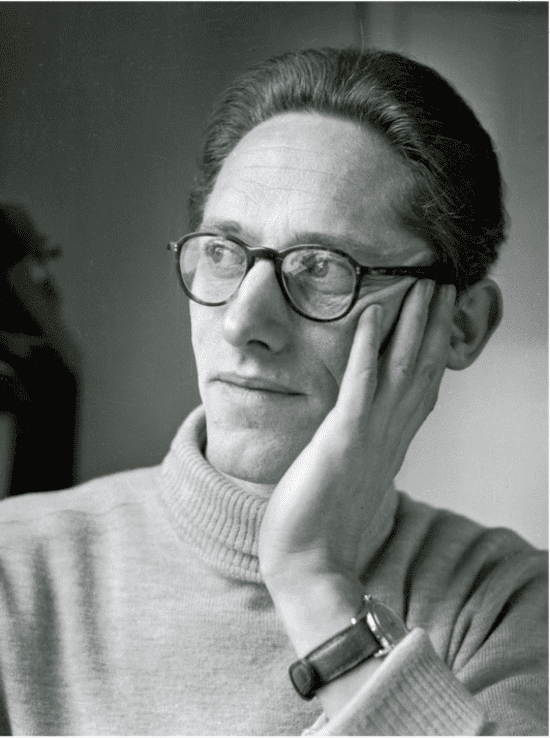
Halfdan Rasmussen in 1953.

Halfdan Wedel Rasmussen (29 January 1915 in Copenhagen – 2 March 2002) was a Danish poet. He was known for his literary nonsense verse for children and his serious adult writings about social issues and human rights. He was awarded with the Ministry of Culture's children book prize (Kulturministeriets Børnebogspris) in 1965.

== Career ==
Rasmussen was a resistance fighter during the German occupation. In the summer of 1942 he rented a cottage at Engestofte from future Danish Resistance hero Monica Wichfeld, sharing it with journalist Hilmar Wulff and his new wife, teacher Karen Inga Petersen.

In 1943 he married writer Ester Nagel. They divorced in 1973. They had two children, actress Iben Nagel Rasmussen (1945) and singer-songwriter Tom Nagel Rasmussen (1946).

He became very well known and respected as a poet, nearly becoming a national poet of Denmark.

One of his poems, Ikke Bødlen, was featured as one of the best poems on Human Rights on a 1979 book published by Amnesty International Denmark, and would be later translated into the first verse of Roger Waters' song Each Small Candle.

== Politics ==
Rasmussen joined the anarcho-syndicalist movement at an early age, and from his 20s and on-wards he contributed to the syndicalist weekly Arbejdet ("Work"). In the early 60s, he helped edit and publish the memoirs of revolutionary syndicalist Christian Christensen. Later on Rasmussen was also active in the Danish anti-nuclear movement, the campaigns against EU membership, and in Amnesty International.

== Bibliography ==
- Vorherres Rosa, short story in Det første møde
- Soldat eller menneske (1941)
- Kejser Næsegrus og Kæmpesmeden: eventyr (1943)
- Det lukkede ansigt (1943)
- Solen, maanen og stjernerne: eventyr (1943)
- Digte under besættelsen (1945 )
- Længsel, poems in Der brænder en ild (1945)
- Min barndom var en by (1945)
- Korte skygger (1946)
- De afsindige (1948)
- Fem små troldebørn, (together with Ib Spang Olsen, 1948)
- Gaden (1948)
- På knæ for livet (1948)
- Den som har set september (1949)
- Norske nutidsdigte: En antologi af ung lyrik (1949)
- Tullerulle tappenstreg spiste gummibolde (1949)
- Aftenland (1950)
- Lange Peter Madsen (1950)
- Forventning (1951)
- Den lille frække Frederik og andre børnerim (1951)
- Tosserier: 1. samling (1951)
- Tosserier: 2. samling (1952)
- Digte i udvalg (1953)
- Tosserier: 3. samling (1953)
- Skoven (together with Ernst Clausen, 1954)
- Tosserier: 4. samling (1954)
- Hemmeligt forår (1955)
- Kasper Himmelspjæt (1955)
- Tosserier: 5. samling (1955)
- I mørket: et digt (1956)
- Tosserier: 6. samling (1956)
- Himpegimpe og andre børnerim (1957)
- Torso: Digte og tegninger fra Grækenland (Torso: Poems and drawings from Greece) (1957)
- Tosserier: 7. samling (1957)
- Lyriske installationer (1958)
- Noget om sundbusser: Et tosseri (1959)
- Pumpegris og andre børnerim (1959)
- Digte (Poems) (1960)
- Tosserier i udvalg (1960)
- Lokumsdigte (1961)
- Stilheden: Skitser fra Grønland (1962)
- Med solen i ryggen (together with Ivan Malinovski, Erik Stinus and others 1963)
- Børnerim (collection of Tullerulle Tappenstreg, Kasper Himmelspjæt, Himpegimpe and Pumpegris, 1964)
- Hilsen til Halfdan (1965)
- Julekalender for voksne (1965)
- Gi’ den en tand til! (short story in Buket for bilister: bundet af Erik Seidenfaden, 1965)
- Halfdans ABC (1967)
- Jacob i Tivoli (1967)
- Julemandens rejse (music by Sven Gyldmark, 1967)
- Mørke over Akropolis (together with Ivan Malinovski and Erik Stinus, 1967)
- Den sommer and Hjemad (short stories in Reflekslys: læsestykker af kendte danske forfattere, 1967)
- Hokus Pokus og andre børnerim (together with Ib Spang Olsen, 1969)
- Stigen (together with Kaj Matthiessen, 1969)
- Mis Ege på eventyr (1970)
- 8 digte om snaps (1970)
- Noget om: tosserier af Halfdan Rasmussen med musik af Mogens Jermiin Nissen (1972)
- Noget om Nanette (together with Ib Spang Olsen, 1972)
- Halfdanes nonsense and nursery rhymes (1973)
- Visse vasse viser (melody by Hans Dalgaard, 1973)
- Corsareu: piratudgave (1975)
- Og det var det (together with Kaj Matthiessen, 1977)
- Klatteradat (together with Kaj Matthiessen, 1978)
- Så du røgen? (together with Kaj Matthiessen, 1978)
- Julekalender for børn (1984)
- 365 godnatsange – rim og remser (together with Benny Andersen and others, 1984)
- Fremtiden er forbi (together with Kaj Matthiessen, 1985)
- Tante Andante (1985)
- Efter Bikini?, (short story in Lær om lyrik, 1985)
- Jeg fandt en sang på vejen: 23 digte, 1986)
- Onkel Karfunkel (together with Ib Spang Olsen, 1988)
- Noget om helte (short story in Dansk i sjette: grundbog, 1989)
- Regnens harpe: digte og grafik fra Irland (together with Ib Spang Olsen, 1990)
- Halfdan i bakspejlet (1991)
- Bare en regnvejrsaften (short stories in Dansk med overblik: litteratur for folkeskolens ældste klasser, 1993)
- Halfdan rundt: til Halfdan Rasmussen på 80 årsdagen den 29. januar 1995 (1995)
- Hr. Olsen og Peter Lohengrin (poems in Et digt om dagen, 1995)
- Mariehønen Evigglad: rim for børn og barnlige sjæle (1996)
- Halvvejs til Halfdan (CD-book with 30 participating actors, writers etc. in 4 generations, published by P.C. Teilmann and Hans Sydow) (2002)
- Faxerier fra Halfdan Rasmussen til Johannes Møllehave (2002)
- 24 tosserier + 24. december (2002)
- Halfdans digte (2004)
- Rapanden Rasmus from Rinkenæs Sogn.

== Honour ==
- 1958 – De Gyldne Laurbær for Torso
- 1965 – Ministry of Culture's children book prize (Kulturministeriets Børnebogspris)
- 1978 – Herman Bangs Mindelegat
- 1988 – Grand Prize of the Danish Academy (Det Danske Akademis Store Pris)

== See also ==
- Ikke Bødlen
