= Bente Clod =

Danish poet and writer

Bente Clod (born 1946) is a Danish poet and prose writer, "an important author within the realist feminist movement of the 1970s". She is also a children's writer. She received the Ministry of Culture's children book prize (Denmark) (Kulturministeriets Børnebogspris) in 2002 for her books Englekraft, I vilden sky and Himmelfald. In 2009 she received the Danish Literature Prize for Women (Dansk Litteraturpris for Kvinder).

== Works ==
=== Articles, poems, prose ===
- Det Autoriserede danske samleje og andre nærkampe [The Authorized Danish Sexual Intercourse and other melees], 1975

=== Novels ===
- Brud (Break Ups), 1977
- Syv sind [In Two Minds], 1980
- Vent til du hører mig le [Wait till you Hear me Laugh], 1983

=== Poetry ===
- Imellem os [Between Us], 1981
- Gul engel [Yellow Angel], 1990

=== Children's books ===
- Englekraft [Angel power], 2001
- I vilden sky [In the wild cloud], 2001
- Himmelfald [Skyfall], 2002
