= Louis Jensen =

Danish author (1943–2021)

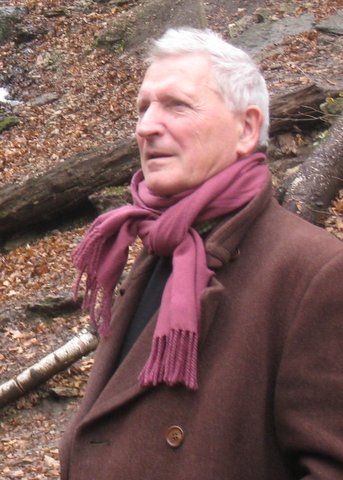
- Louis Jensen in Decorah, Iowa 2008
- Born: 19 July 1943; Nibe, Denmark
- Died: March 4, 2021 (aged 77)
- Occupation: Author
- Awards: Ministry of Culture's children book prize (Denmark) (1989)

Louis Jensen (19 July 1943 – 4 March 2021) is a Danish author and innovator in the international literary trends of flash fiction, metafiction, prose poetry, and magical realism. While he published more than 90 books for both adults and children, he was best known for his children's books, which include picture books, short stories, flash fiction, creative nonfiction and novels. His work is characterized by wordplay and playful experiments in form and structure, which have led critics to draw comparisons to Borges, Calvino, Gogol, and the poetry of the Oulipo movement. His work is also rooted in the fairy tale and folk tale tradition, and is deeply influenced by the Danish author Hans Christian Andersen.

In 1992, Jensen published the first volume of 100 stories in his "Square Story" project. Over the course of the next 24 years, he accomplished his goal of writing 1001 of these very short stories, each in the shape of a square. The stories were collected into volumes of 100 stories each; in 2016, he published his tenth volume of 100 stories, and an eleventh volume with a single, final story. The Danish author and literary critic Rikke Finderup has called this work "one of the most radical literary projects in all of Danish literature," and the Square Stories have found an audience among adult readers as well as children.

In Jensen's many literary works for children and for adults, the reader encounters an imaginative landscape where anything can happen. According to critic Anna Karlskov Skyggebjerg, "In most of Louis Jensen's books, the main character has something to do with the supernatural, the magic, or the fantastic." But like his literary forefathers H.C. Andersen and the Brothers Grimm, Jensen uses his fantastical settings to portray a world of real dangers, moral and physical, and real human experiences of love and loss. As Skyggebjerg remarks, "In Jensen's books, there is a great deal of cruelty and evil, but also love and friendship between different creatures and humans."

Jensen received multiple awards and prizes. He was nominated several times for both of the most prestigious international awards in children's literature, the Astrid Lindgren Memorial Award and the Hans Christian Andersen Award. He made the short list (5 authors, nominated from 34 countries) for the Hans Christian Andersen Award two times, in 2010 and again in 2016. In 2002, he was chosen by the Danish National Art Foundation to be included on the roster of 275 Danish artists who are awarded an annual stipend for their lifelong contributions to the arts and culture of Denmark. In 2014, he was nominated for the Nordic Council Children and Young People's Literature Prize for his eighth collection of square stories, published in 2012. The Nordic Council praised the "humour and seriousness" of Jensen's work, suggesting that his stories have "brought greetings from Hans Christian Andersen, Lewis Carroll and E. T. A. Hoffman and other great poets to all the children and adults who just wanted to read along."

== Life ==
Louis Jensen was born in Nibe, Denmark close to the Limfjord in northern Jutland. He described his mother's childhood in the biographically based book, "En historie om seks søstre" ("A story of six sisters," Gyldendal, 2009). His family moved from Nibe to Beder, south of Aarhus, when he was 12. The move was painful for Jensen; he missed his friends and he longed for the woods and waters of his childhood home. Memories of his childhood in Nibe are found in many of his works, including his 2014 collection of short prose pieces, "Elefanterne holdt hver gang med Tarzan" ("The elephants always sided with Tarzan"), which "turns the story of Jensen's childhood into mystic stuff, into literature." As a young man, Jensen studied to be an architect, with a specialty in urban planning, and he worked as an architect and city planner for a private firm next to the Aarhus townhall. He published his first poem in 1970 in the literary magazine "Hvedekorn," and his first book of poetry in 1972. His first novel for young readers, "Krystalmanden" (The Crystal Man), was published in 1986. Beginning in 1992, he worked full-time as an author. He lived in Aarhus, Denmark, with his wife, the painter Elisabeth Wegger. He had three grown children, and several grandchildren. He died in Aarhus on March 4, 2021, after suffering a heart attack while bicycling with friends.

== Works ==
=== Square Story Project ===
The Square Stories are Louis Jensen's invented literary form: very short microfictions, formatted in the shape of a square block of text, and printed one to a page. Jensen published ten collections of 100 stories. With the eleventh and final book in the series, which includes 100 pictures and one story, Jensen reached his goal of producing 1001 stories.

The 1001 square stories share several formal features. They are all brief, generally 100 words or less, and they are all squares (with the exception of one triangular story in the fourth volume). The stories are each numbered—not on the page, but within the story itself. The first begins "engang der var," or "once there was," a variation on the traditional opening of a Danish fairy tale "der var engang," which is the equivalent of the English "once upon a time." The stories that follow each have their own number: a second time there was, a third time, and so on, all the way up to "a one thousand and first time there was." Each of the ten published volumes of stories also includes a final, unnumbered story, that begins "en helt anden gang," or, "another time altogether."

According to translator and critic Lise Kildegaard, the enumeration of the stories "has a complex effect on the reader's experience." The numbers both indicate the scope of the 1001 story project, and, by identifying the order of the stories, they locate the reader precisely within it: "By assigning each story a unique place within the collection, the simple enumeration of stories places into tension the whole and the part, the general and the specific. The reader simultaneously grasps the 1001 story project in its grand ambition and the individual iteration of a single story in all its local particularity."

In theme, style, and content, the stories are diverse. Some are like fairy tales, with familiar characters like kings, queens, and dragons. Other stories feature human characters, animals, or animated natural beings such as trees, bushes, or grass. Several stories include inanimate objects as characters, such as forks, frying pans, and rubber balls, in the tradition of the Scandinavian "tingseventyr," or "object fairy tales." Several metafictional square stories make characters out of the alphabet letters, the words, and the stories themselves.

Jensen also includes many stories that have no characters, plot, or action. According to Lise Kildegaard, these "ludic and lyrical" stories reveal Jensen's close observation of nature and his poetic appreciation of a world that combines in equal measure "familiarity and strangeness, commonplace reality and ecstatic vision."

The Square Stories appeal to a wide audience and readership. As Søren Fanø (Lecturer and specialist in children's literature) explains in his review of the eleventh volume, "Smaller children simply listen to the stories, older children contemplate both form and meaning, high school students analyze and interpret them, and among some grown ups they attain cult status and become collectibles. That doesn't always happen to authors and illustrators."

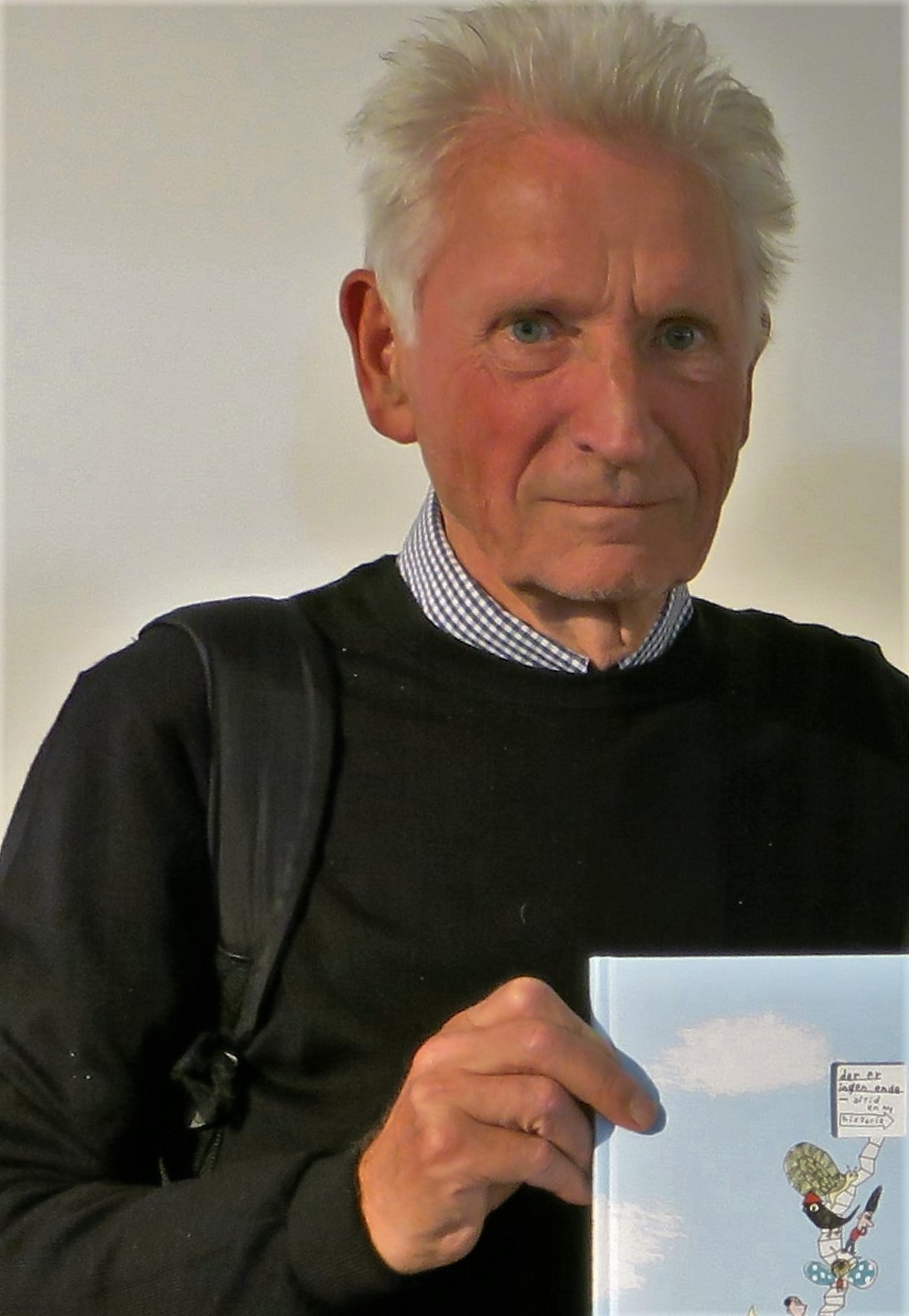
Louis Jensen holding the eleventh and final volume in his Square Stories series.

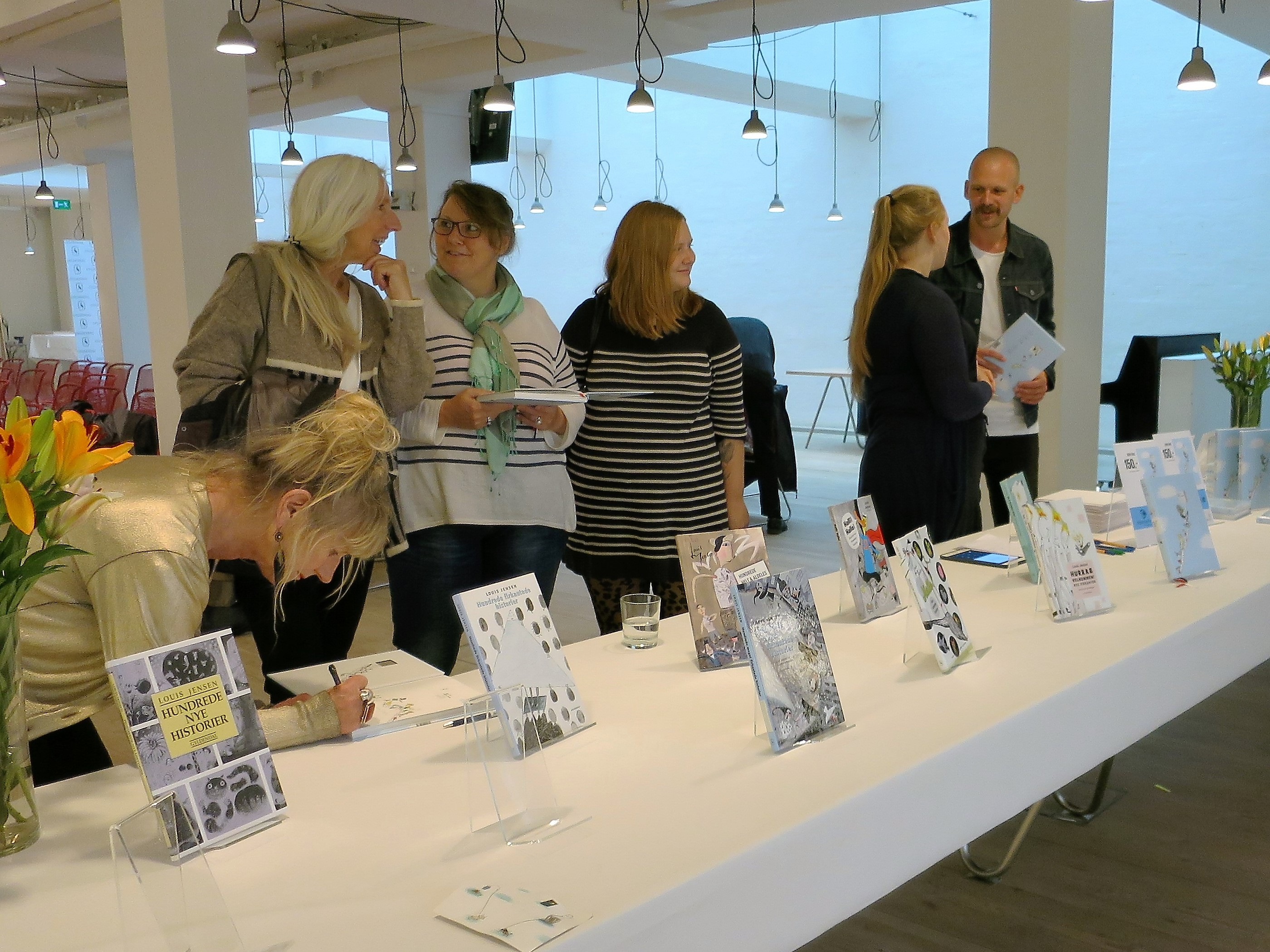
Celebration at Gyldendal Publishing house in Copenhagen, in honor of the publication of Louis Jensen's eleventh and final volume in his Square Stories series

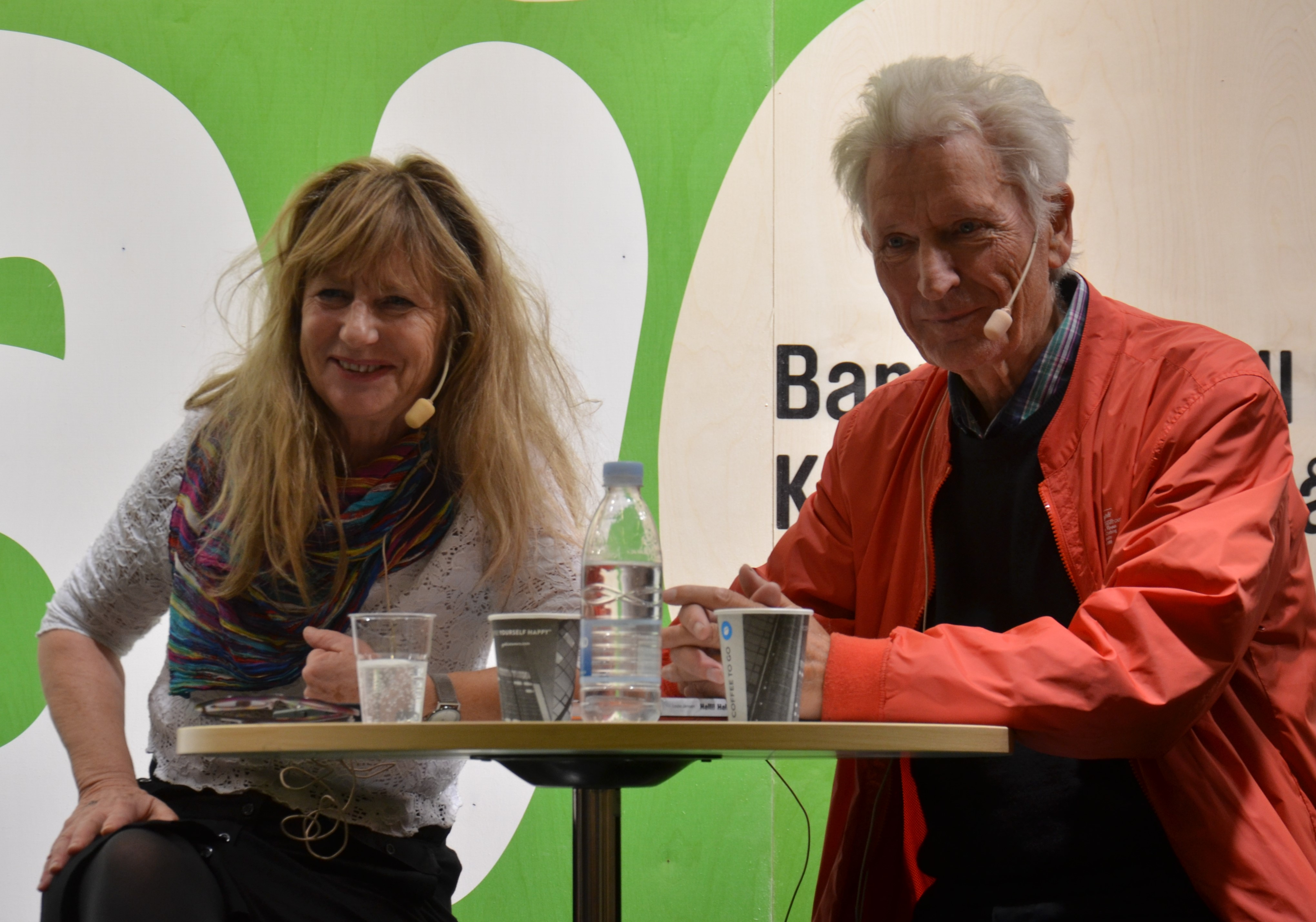
Louis Jensen with Illustrator Lilian Brøgger

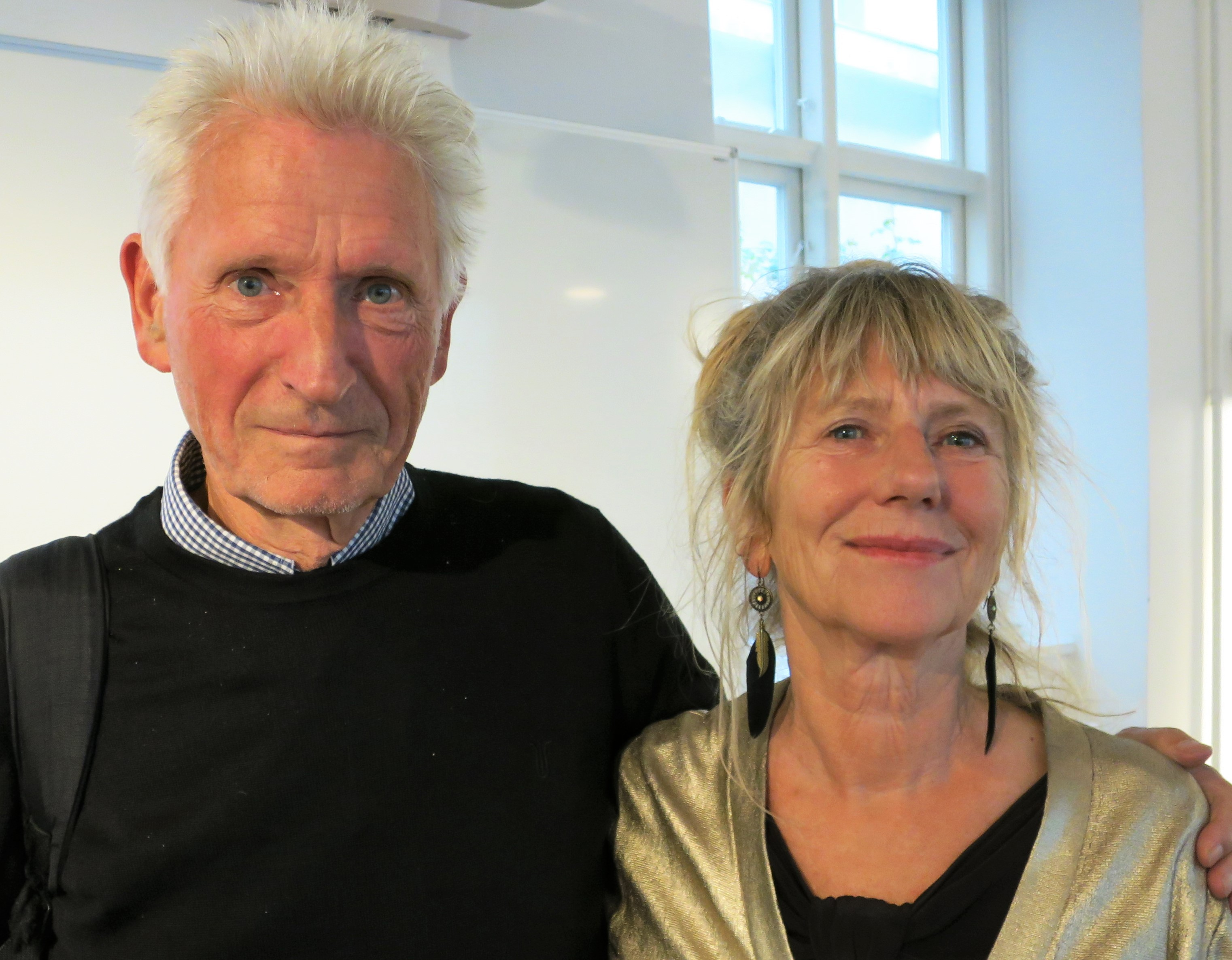
Louis Jensen and Lilian Brøgger at the reception at Gyldendal Publishers, for the celebration of the 11th volume (and 1001 story) in Jensen's Square Stories series

The eleven volumes of the Square Stories are illustrated by Lilian Brøgger, a prize-winning Danish illustrator. In the first ten volumes, every ten stories are preceded by a two-page illustration. The interaction between the illustrations and the stories that come after them adds to the quirky charm of the books. The first books in the series were illustrated in black and white drawings. Brøgger began to add some color to the illustrations in the fourth book. The eleventh and final book in the series, illustrated by Lilian Brøgger and Maria Lundén, includes 134 pages of drawings, most of them in color. Several of the illustrations in this final volume refer back to stories from the first ten volumes. According to critic Anna Karlskov Skyggebjerg, Brøgger "has given the texts new meanings without closing the openness to many interpretations that is one of their hallmarks." Skyggebjerg remarks that Brøgger's illustrations are "quite at the same innovative level as the texts." In a review of the ninth volume of stories in Kristeligt Dagblad, Sara Nørholm writes that Brøgger's illustrations have been "kissed by Picasso, with his mouth full of peat and sunflowers. She blends the bright and thriving happy with the gloomy and creepy in red, black and bright yellow, while she calls the strangest characters forward. With equal ease, she gives space to a smile as wide as a container ship and to a hairy wart that's so small that you can not actually see it, but you can see it anyway."

Lilian Brøgger was nominated for the Hans Christian Andersen Award for illustrators in 2020. The citation states, "In her debut years in the 1970s, she worked in a consciously crude and awkward social-realist style. She contributed to the more poetic and fairytale-like imagery of the 1980s, and has held her own in the postmodern and deconstructionist revival that has characterized the 1990s and the turn of the century. Her curiosity has led her to use many techniques and visual forms and her work spans a wide range of expression. This progress can be seen in Louis Jensen’s Hundrede firkantede historier 1-9 (Hundred square stories, 1-9, 1992-2014) where her illustrations developed from fine black and white lines to powerful colours to graphic and collage."

The eleven volumes of the 1001 Square Stories are:

- Hundrede historier (A hundred stories). Gyldendal 1992.
- Hundrede nye historier (A hundred new stories). Gyldendal 1995.
- Hundrede splinternye historier (A hundred brand new stories). Gyldendal 2000.
- Hundrede firkantede historier (A hundred square stories). Gyldendal 2002.
- Hundrede meget firkantede historier (A hundred very square stories). Gyldendal 2005.
- Hundrede helt & aldeles firkantede historier (A hundred completely and totally square stories). Gyldendal 2007.
- Hallo!: flere hundrede historier (Hello! A hundred more stories). Gyldendal 2009.
- Halli! hallo! så er der nye firkantede historier (Hello hello! Here's a hundred new square stories). Gyldendal 2012.
- Hurra og velkommen! Nye firkanter (Hooray and you're welcome! New squares). Gyldendal 2014.
- Så er butikken åben! Nye firkanter på alle hylder (The store is open! New squares on all the shelves). Gyldendal 2016.
- Der er ingen ende: altid en ny historie (There is no end: always a new story). Gyldendal 2016.

=== Children's and young adult books ===
- Krystalmanden (The crystal man). Gyldendal 1986.
- Tusindfuglen (A thousand birds). Gyldendal 1987.
- Hjerterejsen (The heart's journey). Gyldendal 1988.
- Drageflyverne og syv andre historier (Hang gliders and seven other stories). Gyldendal 1988.
- Det grønne spor (The green path). Gyldendal 1989.
- Karl Kluges dobbelte skattejagt (Karl Kluge's double treasure hunt). Gyldendal 1990.
- Plus-Four og Katten-Skatten (Plus-Four and Katten-Skatten). Gyldendal 1991.
- Skelettet på hjul (The skeleton on wheels). Gyldendal 1992.
- Den fortryllede by (The enchanted town). Gyldendal 1993.
- Karl Kluge og Ondskaben (Karl Kluge and evil). Gyldendal 1994.
- Nøgen (Naked). Gyldendal 1995.
- Et hus er et ansigt – en bog for børn om arkitektur (A house is a face: a book about architecture for children). Gyldendal 1998.
- Den kløvede mand (The cloven man). Gyldendal 1999.
- Den strandede mand – tolv fortællinger om havet og hjertet (The man on the beach: twelve stories of the sea and the heart). Høst & Søn 2000.
- Den frygtelige hånd (The scary hand). Høst & Søn 2001.
- Tinhjerte og ællingefjer: en bog om H.C. Andersen (Tin heart and duckling feathers: a book about H C Andersen). Høst & Søn 2004.
- En historie om seks søstre (A story of six sisters). Gyldendal 2009.
- Stygge streger: en kunstbog for børn (Ugly lines: an art book for children). Klematis 2009.
- 2 kroner og 25 øre (2 crowns and 25 cents). Gyldendal 2010.
- Kejserinden (The empress). Replikant 2011.
- Rejsen til Gud (The journey to God). Gyldendal 2011.
- Rejsen til min far (The journey to my father). Gyldendal 2012.
- L.I.V. - en historie om forelskelse (LIV—a story about love). Gyldendal 2013.
- Kong Knap og bamsens forsvundne øje (King Button, and the teddy bear's lost eye). Gyldendal 2013.
- Tork og Hest (Tork and Horse). Alfa 2012.
- Tre venner (Three friends). Gyldendal 2013. Illustrated by Hanne Bartholin.
- Tork og Hest - Den store blyant (Tork and Horse—The big pencil). Jensen & Dalgaard 2014.
- Elefanterne holdt hver gang med Tarzan: en bog om drenge (The elephants always sided with Tarzan: a book about boys). Gyldendal 2014.
- Tork og Hest - på nye eventyr (The new adventures of Tork and Horse). Jensen & Dalgaard 2015.
- Tork og Hest - Den Porcelæne Danserinde (Tork and Horse—The Porcelain Dancer). Jensen & Dalgaard 2016.
- Drengen der fik en hunds hjerte (The boy who got the heart of a dog). Gyldendal 2016.
- Tork og Hest - Den Onde Troldmand (Tork and Horse—The Evil Wizard). Jensen & Dalgaard 2017.
- På bakken højt oppe et hvidt hus (High on the hill a white house). Gyldendal 2017.
- Lakridsmanden (The Licorice Man). Child Experience Design 2017.
- Manden med nøglehullerne: 18 magiske fortællinger (The man with keyholes: 18 magical stories). Gyldendal 2018.

=== Picture books ===
- Zoofabetet (Zoophabet). Alinea 1996.
- Hjalmars nye hat (Hjalmar's new hat). Gyldendal 1997.
- Hendes Kongelige Højhed Museprinsessen (Her Royal Highness the Princess Mouse). Gyldendal 1998.
- De bortblæste bogstaver (The blown away alphabet). Gyldendal 2001.
- Byen hvor husene bytter plads (The town where the houses switched places). Høst & Søn 2001.
- Luis og sølvmønten (Luis and the silver coin). Danida 2002.
- Bogstavskolen (The alphabet school). Gyldendal 2002.
- Den vrangvendte bamse (The inside-out teddy bear). Høst & Søn 2002.
- Månebåden (The moonboat). Danida 2003.
- Hør her stær! (Listen up, bird!) Høst & Søn 2004.
- Den meget tørstige mor (The very thirsty mother). Høst & Søn 2005.
- Bent og den kinesiske kasse (Bent and the Chinese Box). Gyldendal 2007.
- Emma og bogstaverne (Emma and the alphabet). Gyldendal 2012.
- Mix & Bax på arbejde (Mix and Bax at work). Gyldendal 2017.
- Milles Malebog (Mille's Painting Book). Gyldendal 2020.

=== Easy Readers ===
- Blå kong serie (The blue king series): Dansklærerforeningen Forlag 2001
  - Flyveren (The flyers)
  - Skoven (The woods)
  - Dukken (The doll)
  - Bålet (The bonfire)
  - Havet (The sea)
- Drengen og kufferten serie [The boy and the suitcase series]: Dansklærerforeningen Forlag 2001
  - Drengen og den brune kuffert (The boy and the brown suitcase)
  - Drengen og den sorte kuffert (The boy and the black suitcase)
  - Drengen og den blå kuffert (The boy and the blue suitcase)
  - Drengen og den gule kuffert (The boy and the yellow suitcase)
  - Drengen og den hvide kuffert (The boy and the white suitcase)
- Engang var der serie (Once upon a time series): Dansklærerforeningen Forlag, 2002
  - Kvi-vit (Tweet tweet)
  - Sji-sju (Drip drop)
  - Muuh (Mooo)
  - Blob (Plop)
  - Råb-råb (Hey hey)
- Danskfidusen serie (Danish easy readers series): Dansklærerforeningen Forlag 2002
  - Jeg har en næse (I have a nose)
  - Jeg har en mund (I have a mouth)
  - Jeg har to øjne (I have two eyes)
  - Jeg har hår på hovedet (I have hair on my head)
  - Jeg har to fødder (I have two feet)

=== Poetry collections for adults ===
- Bremsen i bund (Pushing the brakes). Jorinde & Joringel 1973.
- Ich weiss nicht was soll ich bedeuten (I don't know what I mean). Jorinde & Joringel 1974.
- Den århusianske hund (The dog from Aarhus). Jorinde & Joringel 1974.
- Den århusianske hund II (The dog from Aarhus II). Jorinde & Joringel 1975.
- Jensen, Louis, Gorm Rasmussen og Torben Schultz: Digtstafet 1975.
- Det er Dig, Baby (Baby, it's you). Jorinde & Joringel 1978.
- 25 digte (25 poems). Jorinde & Joringel 1978.
- Aben og månen (The monkey and the moon). Jorinde & Joringel 1980.

=== Novels and short prose collections for adults ===
- At læne sin kind mod verden (To rest one's cheek upon the world). Gyldendal 1991.
- Men i lyset hende (Yet in her light). Gyldendal 1992.
- Opfyldelse (Fulfillment). Gyldendal 1993.
- Det øverste af en længsel (The height of longing). Gyldendal 1994.
- Alma. Gyldendal 2003.
- Skomagerbakken (Shoemaker Hill). Gyldendal 2006.
- At skrive på hjertets sider (To write on the heart's pages). Gyldendal 2009.
- Elefanterne holdt hver gang med Tarzan: en bog om drenge (The elephants always sided with Tarzan: a book about boys). Gyldendal 2014.
- Stjernebilleder (Constellations). Gyldendal 2015.
- På bakken højt oppe et hvidt hus (High on the hill a white house). Gyldendal 2017.

=== Translations ===
- Jensen, Louis; Kildegaard, Lise (2007). "Three Square Stories". Translation Studies Journal. 2 (Fall 2007).
- The Echo of Wonder. Translated by Thomas E. Kennedy. The McNeese Review. Vol. 50, Issue 2. 2012.
- Jensen, Louis; Kildegaard, Lise (Spring 2012). "Five Square Stories". The Iowa Review. 42 (1): 93–97. doi:10.17077/0021-065X.7123.
- Uma jornada para Deus (Rejsen til Gud). Translated into Portuguese by Eloísa Lemos Fochi. Edelbra, 2013.
- Fifteen Square Stories. Translated by Lise Kildegaard. North American Review, Volume 309, Number 1. Spring 2024.

=== Adaptations ===
Jensen's Square Stories have been adapted into several theater productions, including

- "100 Historier--og en til" ("100 Stories--and one more"). Based on the square stories. Script adaptation and directed by Marc van der Velden. Theater Corona la Balance, Copenhagen. 2008, 2009.
- "Mak-værk" ("Botch-Up"). Based on the square stories. Script adaptation by Tina Andersen and Bjarne Sandborg. Directed by Bjarne Sandborg. Teater Refleksion, Aarhus. 2008.
- "Square Stories." Based on the square stories, translated by Lise Kildegaard. Script adaptation and directed by Robert Larson. Luther College, Decorah IA. 2008.
- "En Mærkelig Have" ("A Remarkable Garden"). Based on 23 square stories. Script adaptation by Pernille Bach and Christian Schrøder. Directed by Lisa Becker. Teaterværkstedet Madam Bach, 2009.
- "Rejsen til Gud" ("The Journey to God"). Based on the short story. Script adaptation and directed by Marc van der Velden. ZeBU Theatre, Copenhagen. 2016.
- "Drengen Der Fik En Hunds Hjerte" ("The Boy Who Got the Heart of a Dog"). Based on the novel. Script adaptation and directed by Vibeke Wrede, after an idea by Mie Brandt. Teatret Zeppelin, Copenhagen. 2018.

== Awards and honors ==
- Kulturministeriets Børnebogspris (Danish Ministry of Culture's Children's Book Prize), 1989.
- Statens Kunstfond Produktionspræmie (Danish National Art Foundation Prize), 1991 and 1995.
- Nordisk Skolebibliotekarforenings Børnebogspris (Nordic Children's Book Prize), 1996.
- Dansk Forfatterforenings H.C. Andersen Legat (H.C. Andersen Stipend), 1998.
- Statens Kunstfond Livsvarig ydelse (Danish National Art Foundation Lifelong Stipend), 2002–present.
- Gyldendals Store Børnebogspris (Gyldendal's Major Children's Book Prize), 2009.
- Astrid Lindgren Memorial Award: nominated 11 times in the 15 years of the award: every year 2004–2010; 2014; 2016–2018.
- Hans Christian Andersen Award: nominated several times; short-listed 2010, 2016.
- Nordic Council Children and Young People's Literature Prize nominated, 2014 for Halli! hallo! så er der nye firkantede historier [Hello hello! Here's a Hundred New Square Stories], Gyldendal, 2012.
- Montanas Litteraturpris: nominated with Lillian Brøgger, 2016, for Der er ingen ende: altid en ny historie (There is no end: always a new story).
- Politikens Frit-Flet Pris (Politiken newspaper), 9 March 2017, for Der er ingen ende: altid en ny historie (There is no end: always a new story).
