= Ib Spang Olsen =

Danish children's illustrator and writer (1921–2012)

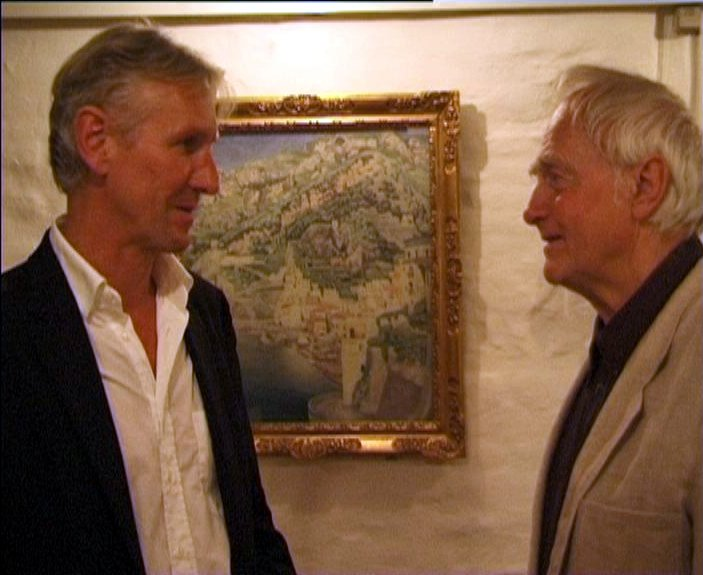
Olsen (right) and Steffen Brandt in 2003.

Ib Spang Olsen (11 June 1921 – 15 January 2012) was a Danish writer and illustrator best known to generations of Danes for cartoons and illustrations, many of which appeared in children's publications. Those include a series of nursery rhyme books written by Halfdan Rasmussen, including "Halfdans ABC".

However, he also wrote his own children's books, such as the whimsical tale of the seasons, The Marsh Crone's Brew. Olsen drew for newspapers, magazines, books, posters, television, and comics. For his lasting contribution as a children's illustrator Olsen received the international Hans Christian Andersen Medal in 1972.

== Life ==
Olsen was born in Østerbro, Copenhagen. He had a modest upbringing but his memories of his childhood remained and became inspirations for his humorous and grotesque pencil drawings of everyday life.

Olsen died in Copenhagen following a short illness on 15 January 2012, at the age of 90. His memorial service was held at the Marienborg Chapel on 23 January. He was survived by his wife, the artist Nulle Øigaard, and by his four children: Tine and Tune from his first marriage, filmmaker Lasse Spang Olsen and Martin Spang Olsen from his marriage to Øigaard. Lasse began a documentary film about his father in 2005 entitled Det er med hjertet man ser.

== Career ==
He first worked as a cartoonist in 1942 for the Hjemmets Søndag section of the Social-Demokraten, a trade union newspaper (now the Aktuelt). He then enrolled in the Copenhagen Art Academy and the Graphic School, where he studied from 1945 to 1949. From 1952 to 1961 he taught at Bernadotteskolen. Throughout his career, he illustrated for newspapers, magazines, books, comics, and even television and posters.

Olsen is known for his experimental forms and one of the artistic highlights is Det lille lokomotiv (The Little Train), which was published in 1954. While his drawings usually included pencil, Olsen used different drawing techniques such as zincography and heliographics, which made it possible to print original drawings in book prints and offset.

In 1982, Olsen also became the chairman of the Danish Ministry of Culture's working group about children and culture. He was also a member of the Academia Council, which is part of the Royal Danish Art Academy.

== Awards ==
The biennial Hans Christian Andersen Award conferred by the International Board on Books for Young People is the highest recognition available to a writer or illustrator of children's books. Olsen received the illustration award in 1972. His profile for the IBBY 50th anniversary in 2002 opens, "Artist from the country of childhood!"

In Denmark he was awarded the Ministry of Culture's children book prize (Kulturministeriets Børnebogspris) in 1964 and the Gyldendal Prize for Children's Books in 2008. He was an active member of the Academia Council, which is connected with the Royal Danish Academy of Fine Arts, and he served on the Danish Ministry of Culture's committee on children and culture from 1982 to 1990.
