= Knut Brofoss =

Norwegian civil servant

Knut Brofoss (9 October 1948 – 3 April 2025) was a Norwegian civil servant.

He was born in Oslo as a son of economist and politician Erik Brofoss. Knut Brofoss took the cand.jur. degree, and was hired in the Ministry of Justice and the Police in 1975. From 1983 he worked in the Ministry of Social Affairs. He was deputy under-secretary of state from 1988 to 1999, and acting permanent under-secretary of state in 1999. From 1999 to 2000 he worked as a prosecutor in the Norwegian National Authority for the Investigation and Prosecution of Economic and Environmental Crime. He then became general director of the Norwegian Institute for Alcohol and Drug Research. In 2005 he was appointed director of the National Insurance Court. Trine Fernsjø took over in 2016.

He was married to Ingse Stabel.

Brofoss died on 3 April 2025, at the age of 76.

Preceded by Jon Evang (acting)	Director of the National Insurance Court; 2005–2016	Succeeded by Trine Fernsjø
