= Hanne-Vibeke Holst =

Danish writer

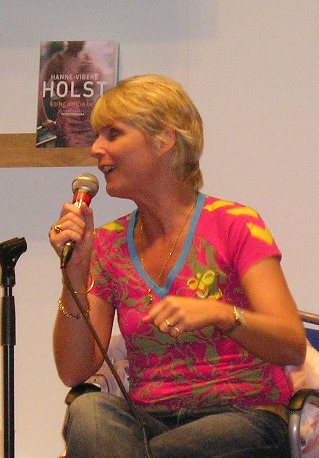
Hanne-Vibeke Holst in Gothenburg 2006

Hanne-Vibeke Holst (born 21 February 1959 in Hjørring, Denmark) is an author. She has an education as a journalist and has worked on the Danish newspapers Berlingske Tidende and Søndags B.T.

She is the daughter of authors Knud Holst Andersen and Kirsten Johanne Høybye. She was married in 1984. Today, she acts as a Goodwill Ambassador to the UNFPA and is a personal appointed member of the Danish UNESCO National Commission.

Her books are mainly about modern women facing both new options and old problems, and have been translated to several languages, including German, Dutch, and Swedish.

In 2003 she was awarded the Søren Gyldendal Prize. In 2008 she won the Danish booksellers annual prize De Gyldne Laurbær (The Golden Laurel).

== Bibliography ==
None of Hanne-Vibeke Holst's books have been translated to English. The English language titles below are thus not official, and subject to change if and when her books are translated to English.

- Knud, den store (Knud, the Great). About her father, the author Knud Holst. (2013)
- Undskyldningen (The Excuse) (2011)
- Dronningeofret (The Queen Sacrifice) (2008)
- Kongemordet (The Regicide) (2005)
- Kronprinsessen (The Crown Princess) (2002)
- Min mosters migræne - eller Hvordan jeg blev kvinde (My Aunt's Migraine - or How I became a woman) (1999)
- En lykkelig kvinde (A joyful woman) (1998)
- Det virkelige liv (The Real Life) (1994)
- Thereses tilstand (The condition of Therese) (1992)
- Hjertets renhed (The purity of the heart) (1990)
- Chicken (1987)
- Nattens kys (Kisses of the night) (1986)
- Til sommer (This Summer) (1985)
- Mor er løbet hjemmefra (Mother ran away from home) (1986)
- Ud af røret, Maja! (Get going, Maja!) (1981)
- Hejsa, Majsa! (Hello, Majsa!) (1980
