= Thøger Birkeland =

Thøger Birkeland (20 March 1922 – 6 April 2011) was a Danish teacher and writer mostly known for his children's books. Birkeland was born in Kalundborg. The most notable of his works are Saftevandsmordet (The Lemonade Murder) and the stories about Krummerne.

Thøger Birkeland received several Danish awards: Ministry of Culture's children book prize (Kulturministeriets Børnebogspris) (1962), Danmarks Skolebibliotekarers Børnebogspris (1980), Den danske boghandlermedhjælperforenings børnebogspris (1981) and together with Bjarne Reuter he received Kommunernes Skolebiblioteks forenings Forfatterpris (1983).
