= Martin Spang Olsen =

Danish actor and writer (born 1962)

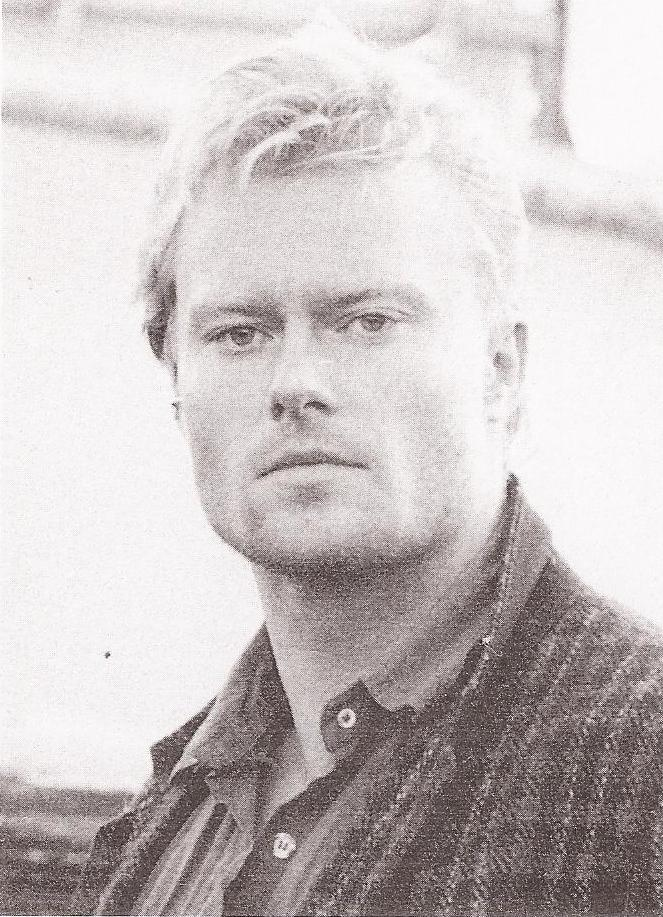
- Olsen in 1990
- Born: 24 November 1962 (age 63)
- Other names: Stuntman; writer; actor
- Years active: 1984–present

Martin Spang Olsen (born 24 November 1962) is a Danish stuntman, stunt coordinator, lecturer, writer, and actor.

== Childhood and education ==
Olsen is the son of pictorial artist and writer Ib Spang Olsen and painter Nulle Øigaard and older brother of film director Lasse Spang Olsen. He is a Postgraduate from Aurehøj Gymnasium (1981) and holds an MA in Musicology and Classic History from University of Copenhagen and Royal Holloway and Bedford New College (University of London) (UK) (1982–2007).

== Career ==
While attending university, Olsen also began professionally acting at the age of 19. Simultaneously, he worked with one of his friends from the Gymnasium to set up an art gallery that also served as a venue to sell his own paintings. His stunt work career began soon after, having him found the Stunt School that he would continue to be head of until it was shut down in 1997. Between him and his brother as a film director, Olsen worked in many positions of the film-making process, including musical composer.

This decades later resulted in him creating the Danish version of sensory training, which the government's Ministry of Education hired him to help introduce into schools through dance, music, and martial arts. He formalized the idea with the establishment of the Institute of Sensory Training in 2012. He combined these ideas with his stunt work and martial arts training to expand the theatre and film practices in Denmark to include more active action scenes from performers. This included closely working with Kasper Holten at the Royal Danish Theatre for the performances of Ivanhoe and Thor to incorporate fighting choreography, including featuring 200 people in an on-stage battle at one time.

== Filmography ==
=== Actor ===
- Himlen Falder (2009)
- Inkasso (2004)
- Kærlighed ved første hik 3 – Anja efter Viktor (2003)
- I Kina spiser de hunde (1999)
- Blind gudinde (1996–97)
- Davids bog (1996)
- Operation Cobra (1995)
- Jesus vender tilbage (1992)
- Sea Dragon (1990)
- Duksedrengen (1989)
- Mord i mørket (1986)
- Den kroniske uskyld (1985)
- Midt om natten (1984)

=== Stunts ===
- Himlen Falder (2009)
- Inkasso (2004)
- Den gode strømer (2004)
- Svarte penge, hvite løgner (2004)
- Jolly Roger (2001)
- Davids bog (1996)
- I Kina spiser de hunde (1999)
- Farlig farvann 1995)
- Bekinisesongen (1993)
- Krummerne 2 - Stakkels Krumme (1992)
- Painful City (1992)
- Gøngehøvdingen (1992)
- Drengene fra Sankt Petri (1991)
- Sea Dragon (1990)
- Bananen - skræl den før din nabo (1990)
- Duksedrengen (1989)
- Miraklet i Valby (1989)
- Jydekompangniet 3 (1989)
- Lykken er en underlig fisk (1989)
- Mord i Paradis (1988)
- Een gang strømer... (1987)
- Mord i market (1986)
- Yes, det er far (1986)
- Walter og Carlo – op på fars hat (1985)
- Den kroniske uskyld (1985)
- Midt om natten (1984)

== Bibliography ==
- Stunt (I-II) (Bogfabrikken Fakta, 1991)
- Stunttræning – vold som leg (Gyldendal, 1994).
- Sang, Dans og Slagsmål (L&R Fakta 1998)
- Organisk Frasering (Edition Wilhelm Hansen, 2002)
- Martin S' Julerim (Elkjaeroghansen, 2002)
