= Kirsten Holst =

Danish author

Kirsten Johanne Holst Høybye (18 March 1936 in Lemvig – 22 September 2008 in Vejle) was a Danish author, best remembered for her book Min ven Thomas (1987), which for a period was a part of the curriculum in the Danish Primary School system.

She was the daughter of Police officer Palle Høybye and Musical teacher Anne-Margrethe Thomsen, married to fellow Danish author Knud Holst. Her Daughter Hanne-Vibeke Holst is also an author.

She is buried in Nørresundby.

== Bibliography ==
Incomplete

- 1976 De unge, de rige og de smukke (ISBN 8755326749, reprinted 1998 ISBN 9788755326743)
- 1976 Safty og smuglerne
- 1977 Døden rejser med
- 1977 Safty og minktyvene
- 1977 Ungerne og juvelrøverne
- 1978 Baggårdsrødderne
- 1978 Syv til alters
- 1978 Ungerne og sommerhusbanden
- 1979 Døden er en drøm
- 1979 Safty og mafiaen
- 1979 Ungerne til søs
- 1981 De lange skygger
- 1981 Også om mange år
- 1982 Det tomme hus
- 1982 Fabriks-hemmeligheden
- 1983 Når det regner på præsten
- 1983 Puslespil
- 1984 Safty og edb-mysteriet
- 1984 Se, døden på dig venter (ISBN 8755325424, reprinted 1997 ISBN 9788755325425)
- 1985 Damen i gråt (ISBN 9788755327856)
- 1986 Ishulen
- 1987 Min ven Thomas (ISBN 9788702044621)
- 1988 Dødens dunkle veje (ISBN 9788755325432)
- 1989 Det skal nok gå, Solomon
- 1989 Sov dukke Lise
- 1991 Som ringe i vandet
- 1992 Mysteriet om det levende lig
- 1994 Mord på Gran Canaria
- 1994 I al sin glans og herlighed
- 1996 Rejsen til Betlehem (ISBN 9788700257924)
- 1996 Var det kærlighed (ISBN 9788700279865)
- 1998 Ludmilla og Klør Konge (ISBN 9788700356542)
- 1998 Mord i Skagen (ISBN 9788772949635)
- 1999 Var det mord? (ISBN 9788755329645)
- 2001 Nikki og bankrøverne
- 2002 Ludmilla på sporet (ISBN 9788702011753)
- 2006 Sin brors vogter (ISBN 9788763805926)
- 2007 Orkanen fra Hillerød (ISBN 9788792095084)
