= Carl Ludovico Stabel =

Norwegian civil servant and judge

Carl Ludovico Stabel (1912–1988) was a Norwegian civil servant and judge.

After the Second World War he worked as a secretary in the Norwegian Ministry of Justice and the Police. He was promoted to assistant secretary, and in 1956 to deputy under-secretary of state. From 1963 to his retirement in 1982 he was a Supreme Court Justice.

He was decorated as a Commander of the Royal Norwegian Order of St. Olav. He was a brother of Fredrik Stabel, and together with Karen Andrea Elisabeth Eide (1914–2001) he had the daughter Ingse Stabel, Supreme Court Justice.
