= Sunniva Ørstavik =

Norwegian civil servant (born 1967)

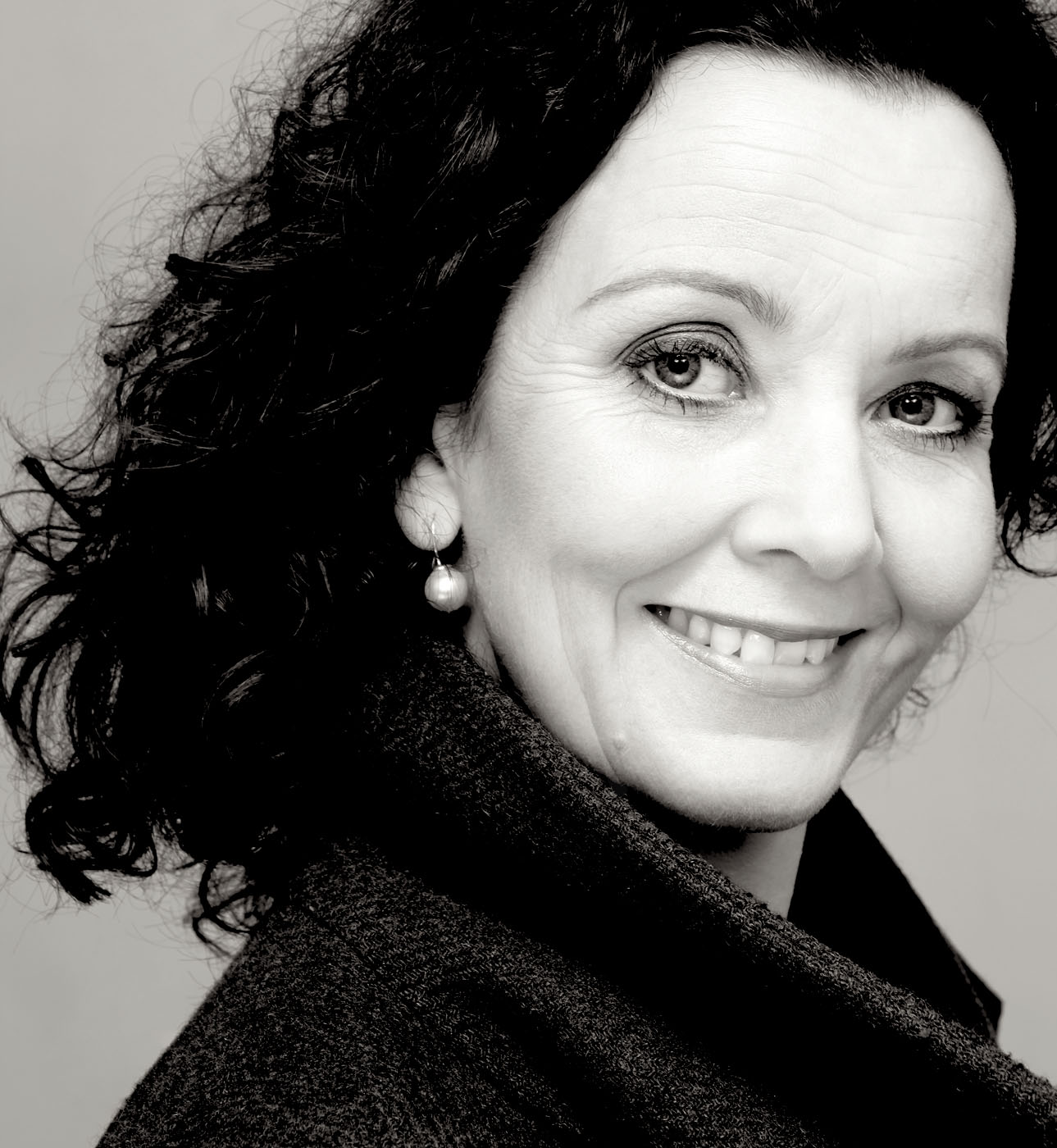

Sunniva Ørstavik (born 13 June 1967) is a Norwegian civil servant, who served as the Gender Equality and Anti-Discrimination Ombud from 2010 to 2016.

She is a sociologist by education, and was secretary-general of the Norwegian Council for Mental Health from 2005 to 2010 and the Gender Equality and Anti-Discrimination Ombud from 2010 to 2016. In 2020 she was one of the signatories of the "Call for Inclusive Feminism," a document which led to the establishment of the Initiative for Inclusive Feminism.

She received the Rights Prize (Rettighetsprisen) in 2015 for work combating domestic violence.
