= Fredrik Stabel =

- Born: 4 January 1914; Kristiania, Norway
- Died: 2 July 2001 (aged 87)
- Occupations: illustrator and writer
- Relatives: Carl Ludovico Stabel (brother); Ingse Stabel (niece)

Fredrik Stabel (4 January 1914 – 2 July 2001) was a Norwegian illustrator and writer. He was born in Kristiania. He is particularly known for his daily satirical column in the newspaper Dagbladet over forty years (1950–1990), on the imaginary society Norsk Dusteforbund. Among his books are Snarere tvert imot, from 1960, Nok av det from 1962, and Jeg sier ikke mer! from 1978.
