= Estrid Ott =

Danish writer and journalist

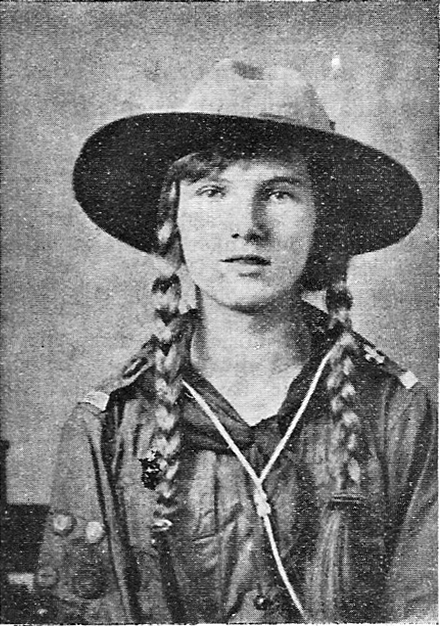
Estrid Ott in girl guide uniform (1918)

Estrid Ott (14 May 1900, Copenhagen — 19 May 1967, Roskilde) was a Danish writer and journalist. From the 1930s, she published many popular books for girls reflecting her keen interest in scouting and her extensive travels. Her Bimbi and Chico books for small children (1936–47) have been widely translated. In addition to some 80 titles for children, Ott is remembered for her play De Pokkers Unger (1945) which was filmed in 1947 as Those Blasted Kids.

== Early life ==
Born on 14 May 1900 in Copenhagen, Estrid Ott was the daughter of the newspaper director Hans Christian Johannes Ott (1873–1906) and his wife Olga Juliette Marie née Sørensen (1871–1929), a writer. Even before she matriculated from Ingrid Jespersens Skole, Copenhagen, she had begun to gain experience as a professional writer.

== Career ==
Keen on scouting, from 1916 Ott edited the magazine Pigespejder (Girl Scouts). She had already published two children's books in 1917 and while at school she contributed articles of interest to young people to the newspaper Politiken. Her third book, Spejderminder (Memories of a Girl Guide) appeared in 1919.

On graduating from high school, she served an apprenticeship with the paper Vestjyllands Folkeblad before joining Berlingske Tidende as a foreign correspondent. She travelled widely but relying on her scouting background, she sought to show that as a girl guide she could always cope wherever she went.

In October 1922, she married the wealthy businessman John Knox Seith (1894–1959) who for a time worked for the Danish East Asiatic Company. They had four children together: (BettY (1924), Joan (1928), Barbara (1929) and John (1931). The couple first spent a year in Finland then moved to the United States before returning to Denmark in 1933. They also spent a year in Greenland with their children. Ott also travelled to Africa, Portugal and Spain.

Ott gained wide popularity for her stories for small children, especially the Bambi and Chico series, and for her books for teenage girls such as Bjørne-Kari, which tells the story of the 14-year-old tomboy, Kari, who lives an exciting life in the mountains of Norway. Written for adults, her play De Pokkers Unger (1945) became successful as the film Those Blasted Kids in 1947.

Estrid Ott died on 19 May 1967 in Roskilde, aged 67.
