= Ikke Bødlen =

Ikke Bødlen (English: "Not the torturer". Or alternatively "Not the executioner") is a poem by Halfdan Rasmussen, featured as one of the best poems on Human Rights on a 1979 book published by Amnesty International Denmark.

Ikke Bødlen would be later translated into the first verse of Roger Waters' song Each Small Candle
