= Per Holm Knudsen =

Danish writer, teacher and psychotherapist (born 1945)

- Born: 18 December 1945 (age 80); Copenhagen, Denmark
- Occupations: Writer; educator; psychotherapist
- Website: psyx.dk

Per Holm Knudsen (born 18 December 1945) is a Danish writer, teacher and psychotherapist. He is the author of The True Story of How Babies Are Made, a detailed and colorfully illustrated children's book that chronicles love, marriage, conception, pre-natal growth, and birth. As the title promises, it explains the biological process of human reproduction, using correct terminology and graphic pictures.

== Bibliography ==
=== Illustrated children's books ===
- Den lille blå bil (Borgen, 1969)
- Palmen Joachim (Borgen, 1970)
- Sæbeboble grøn og sæbeboble rød (Borgen, 1970)
- Ballonen Bubi (Borgen, 1970)
- Sådan får man et barn (Borgen, 1971)
- The True Story of How Babies are Made (ISBN 0-516-03640-8) was published in 1973 by Children's Press of Chicago, Illinois.
  - How a Baby is Made (SBN 85166-420-2) was published in 1973 by Franklin Watts Limited of London, Great Britain.
  - Da solen stod op om natten (Borgen, 1971)
- Frøen Jakob (Borgen, 1972)
- Rødspætten Katinka (Borgen, 1972)
- Musen Malle (Borgen, 1973)
- En muldvarp (Borgen, 1982)

=== Youth novels ===
- Conny og bolighajen (Borgen, 1974)

=== Short stories ===
- Børnelokkeren (1979) in the anthology Med egne øjne og andre noveller, Borgen
- Og så kan man ikke blive soldat (1979) in the anthology Dumme tøser, Jespersen og Pios forlag
- Krig i København (1980) in the anthology Billeder fra 60'erne, Delta (Publishing house) – new improved edition, Branner & Koch (2004)
- Den første kamp (1980) in the anthology I dag, Oktober
- Langt ude ... i skoven (1982) in the anthology Malurt, Tellerup

=== Translations ===
- Sven Wernström: Fjendens sprog (1975), Forlaget GMT
- Sven Wernström: Om at skrive som håndværk (1979), Høst og Søn
- Ulf Nilsson: En kamp for livet (1982), Høst og Søn

== Prizes ==
- Ministry of Culture's children book prize (Denmark) (Kulturministeriets Børnebogspris)
