= Anne Lise Ryel =

Norwegian jurist and politician (born 1958)

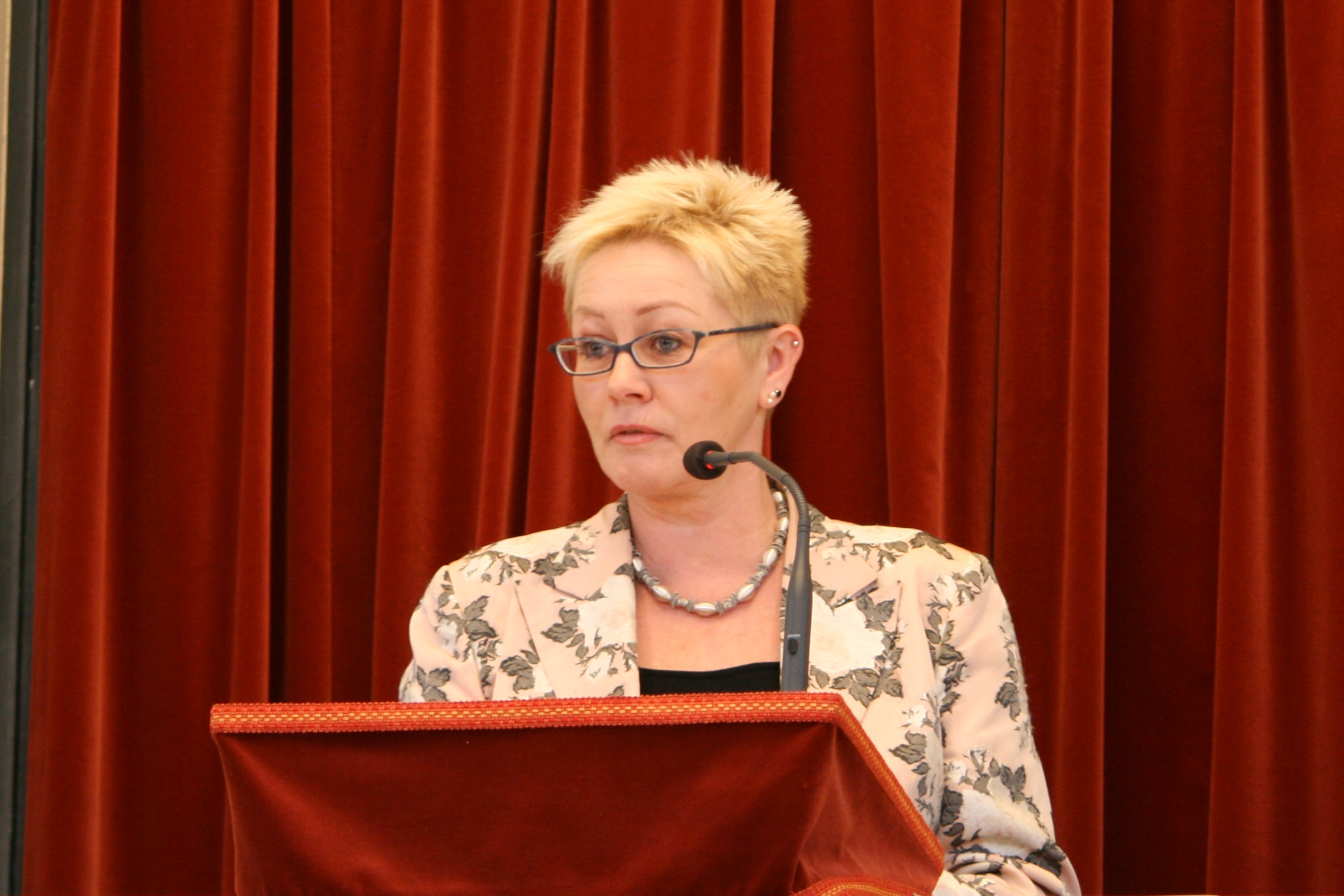
Anne Lise Ryel, 2008

Anne Lise Ryel (born 7 June 1958) is a Norwegian jurist and politician for the Labour Party.

Born in Tromsø, she graduated as cand.jur. from the University of Oslo in 1987.

In 1994 she became the new Norwegian ombudsman for gender equality, taking over for Ingse Stabel. She held this position until 2000. During the first cabinet Stoltenberg, Ryel was appointed State Secretary in the Ministry of Justice. She held the position until the 2001 election, which caused the cabinet to fall. Ryel later became general director of the Norwegian Cancer Association. From 2007 to 2009 she is a board member of the Federation of Norwegian Commercial and Service Enterprises.

She served in the position of deputy representative to the Norwegian Parliament from Oslo during the term 2005–2009.
