= Centre for Gender Equality =

Norwegian government agency

- Logo of the Centre for Gender Equality

Agency overview
- Formed: 1997
- Preceding agency: Council for Gender Equality
- Dissolved: 2006
- Superseding agency: Equality and Anti-Discrimination Ombudsman
- Jurisdiction: Government of Norway
- Headquarters: Oslo
- Website: www.likestilling.no (defunct)

The Centre for Gender Equality (Norwegian: Likestillingssenteret, formally Kompetansesenter for likestilling) was a Norwegian government agency that existed from 1997 to 2006 to promote gender equality. It was a successor to the Council for Gender Equality, that existed from 1973 to 1997. In 2006, its responsibilities were transferred to the new Equality and Anti-Discrimination Ombudsman.

Since 2008, the name Likestillingssenteret has been used by an unrelated, private organisation.

== Directors ==
- Ingunn Yssen (1997–2002)
- Long Litt Woon (2003–2005)

Office manager Mona Larsen-Asp was acting director 2002–2003.
