= National Insurance Court =

The National Insurance Court (Norwegian: Trygderetten) is an appeals court for welfare cases in Norway.

It was established by law on 16 December 1966. Its purpose is to judge in cases, where decisions by (mainly) the Norwegian Labour and Welfare Service have been appealed. Administratively, it is a part of the Norwegian Ministry of Labour and Social Inclusion.

The leader and deputy leader both need qualifications equivalent to a Supreme Court Justice. The current leader is Trine Fernsjø.
