= Hugo Lous Mohr =

Norwegian painter

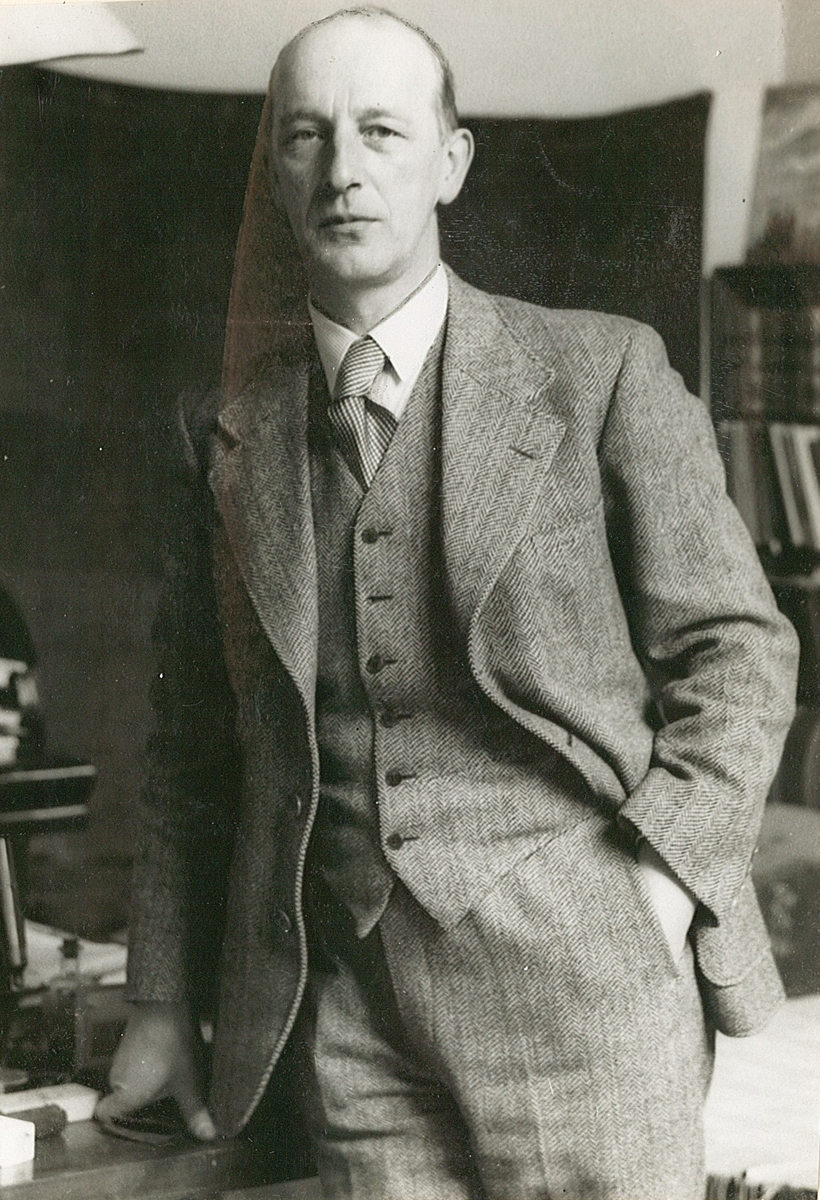
Hugo Lous Mohr

Hugo Lous Mohr (27 September 1889 – 20 February 1970) was a Norwegian painter.

== Biography ==
He was born in Mandal in Lister og Mandal county, Norway. He was the son of Olaf Eugen Mohr (1856–1933) and Jeanette Lous (1860–1942). His father was a vicar at the missionary school operated by the Norwegian Missionary Society in Stavanger. He was a brother of architect Bjarne Lous Mohr and physician Otto Lous Mohr, and brother-in-law of physician Tove Mohr. He graduated from Stavanger Cathedral School in Kongsgård during 1907. He was a student of artist Henrik Sørensen in Kristiania (now Oslo) from 1916 to 1918.

He conducted study trips to Paris 1918-21 and 1924–25, Spain and Italy in 1920, Germany and Italy in 1921–22, the Netherlands and Belgium in 1924 and 1945, and Italy 1939 and 1948.

Mohr received several assignments with religious motives, including the ceiling decorations at Oslo Cathedral (1935–49), restoration on the war-damaged Kristiansand Cathedral (1945) and decorating the vault at Vår Frelsers gravlund (1935–50). He completed the frescoes at Johanneskirken in Bergen (1923–24) and at the rebuilt Volda Church in Volda Municipality (1932). He also decorated altarpieces for Ris Church in Oslo Municipality (1932), Vang Church in Vang Municipality (now part of Hamar Municipality; 1955), Dale Church in Bruvik Municipality (now part of Vaksdal Municipality; 1958) and Olav Chapel in Sandefjord Municipality (1962).

Several of his paintings are located in the National Gallery of Norway. He was decorated Commander of the Order of St. Olav in 1955.

== Selected works ==
- Portrett av Fartein Valen, Valevåg (1917)
- Kristus-hode, Chartres (1921)
- Frosset fjell, Volda (1927)
- Bjart, kunstnerens sønn (1930)
- Korsfestelsen. Skisse til dekorasjon i Volda kirke (1932)
- Skjærgård (1936)
- Fra Rauland (1941)
- Sommer (1956)
