= Abortion in Norway =

Abortion in Norway is available on demand within the first eighteen weeks of gestation, measured as 17 weeks and 6 days from the first day of the last menstrual period. After this 18-week time limit, a request must be submitted to a special medical assessment board that will determine whether an abortion will be granted.

According to the Norwegian Directorate of Health, requirements for being granted an abortion become stricter the longer a woman has been pregnant. After the 18th week of gestation, the pregnancy cannot be terminated except on grounds of grave risk. After the 22nd week of gestation, abortion is prohibited by Norwegian law (except in cases where the fetus is not viable).

Abortion is provided for free to those who are living in Norway.

On 1 June 2024, the gestational limit for legal abortion was increased from 12 weeks to 18 weeks. This new law came into force on 1 June 2025.

== History ==
In Christian V's legislation of 1687, abortion was punishable by death. By the law of 1842, it was no longer a capital offense, but could be punished by up to six years of imprisonment and hard labor or abortion in cases where the mother's life was in danger or the child would be stillborn.

=== Early activism ===
An important milestone for the issue of abortion on request came on 15 January 1915, when Katti Anker Møller gave a speech in Kristiania (now Oslo) calling for legalized abortion on request. She said that "the basis for all freedom is the governance over one's own body, and everything that is in it. The opposite is the condition of a slave." ("Grundlaget for al frihet er rådighet over egen krop og hvad i den er. Det motsatte er en slaves tilstand.")

In the period between 1920 and 1929, about 100 individuals were sentenced for an illegal abortion. In one of Oslo's largest hospitals, 82 women died as a result of illegal abortions, and 3,791 women were treated for injuries sustained under these procedures.

In 1934, the ministry of Justice named a committee to start work on new legislation on abortion, headed by Katti Anker Møller's daughter Tove Mohr. The following year, a campaign opposing the committee's work gathered 207,000 signatures. The government tabled the committee's work.

The political debate continued on the issue, though World War II put other priorities in the public discourse. During the German occupation, the maternal hygiene offices pioneered by Katti Anker Møller were shut down and all their materials put to the fire.

When the maternal hygiene offices reopened in 1950, abortion counseling became one of their main services. An estimated 3,000 legal abortions and 7,000–10,000 illegal abortions were performed each year in the 1950s. In 1956, the prevalence of illegal abortions reached such levels that a council on penal law recommended stiffer penalties for illegal abortions.

=== Gradual liberalization and a core feminist cause ===
Year	Number of abortions	Rate
1965	3455	n/a
1970	7941	n/a
1975	15132	n/a
1976	14754	0.542
1980 (on request)	13531	0.468

In 1960, a new law allowed abortion by application approved by a commission of two physicians, and only on the basis of medical, eugenic, or criminal criteria, and with the consent of the husband if the applicant was married. This law went into effect in 1964.

The application was made by the woman's physician on her behalf, and she made her case alone before the commission. In 1964, 72% of the applications were approved. By 1974, 94% were approved, and the rate increased steadily through the 1970s. Still, practice varied considerably.

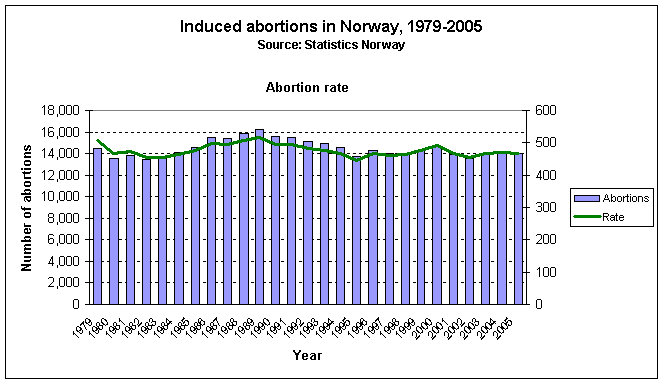
Induced abortions in Norway, 1979–2005

In 1969, the Norwegian Labour Party put abortion on request on their platform, setting the stage for a mainstream debate on abortion within the broader framework of feminism. Proponents of abortion on request improved their organizational strength, forming in 1974 Kvinneaksjonen for selvbestemt abort ("The Women's campaign for abortion on request"). At the same time, Folkeaksjonen mot selvbestemt abort ("the Popular Movement Against Abortion on Request") was formed and led by Anne Enger Lahnstein, submitting 610,000 signatures for their cause. The debate intensified, with feminists on one side of the issue, conservative Christians on the other, and the medical community split.

Abortion on request was put to the vote in Stortinget, but unexpectedly failed to pass by one vote when Socialist Left party representative Otto Hauglin voted against the bill. Although criteria for commission-approved abortions were somewhat relaxed, it became clear that abortion on request would have to wait for the next session of parliament.

This period marked intensifying activism on both sides of the issue. The Christian newspaper Vårt Land became the platform for those opposed to the pending legislation, whereas the Socialist and feminist press advocated for it. The non-Socialist parties were unified in their opposition to abortion on request, maintaining that the commission arrangement was appropriate.

=== Abortion on Demand ===
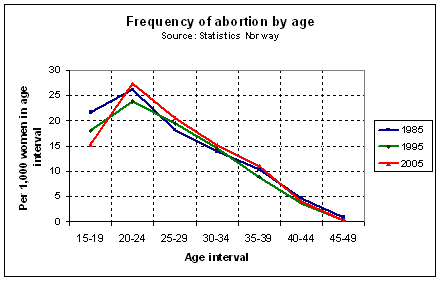
Abortion frequency, by age

In 1978, after much preparation and activism, by, among others, physicians Berthold Grünfeld and Axel Strøm of the Norwegian Labour Party and the Socialist Left Party, respectively, a law was passed with a one-vote majority, according to which abortion could be performed on request in the first 12 weeks of pregnancy, while abortions after the end of the 12th week up to 18 weeks of pregnancy could be granted by application, under special circumstances, such as the mother's health or her social situation; if the fetus is in great danger of severe medical complications; or if the woman has become pregnant while under-age, or after sexual abuse. After the 18th week, the reasons for terminating a pregnancy must be extremely weighty. An abortion will not be granted after viability. Minor girls under 16 years of age need parental consent, although in some circumstances, this may be overridden. Soon after the laws were passed, bishop Per Lønning resigned from his office in the Church of Norway in protest against the new legislation.

On 1 June 2024, the gestational limit for abortion on request was increased from 12 weeks to 18 weeks, with the new law coming into force on 1 June 2025.

== Current practices ==
Percentage of conceptions aborted in Norway

Although some argued that easier access to abortion would cause abortion rates to increase, the number of abortions has remained stable since the early 1970s, especially when adjusted for demographic changes related to fertility.

Between 1999 and 2003, 1,740 applications for abortions between the 12th and 16th week were considered by commissions in Norway. Of these, 1647, or 95.2% were approved.

In 2011, midwives at Rikshospitalet alarmed authorities that some aborted fetuses had heartbeats for up to one hour before they died. Data from the Norwegian Institute of Public Health revealed that between 2001 and 2011, 17 fetuses had been aborted at 22 or 23 weeks gestation. In September 2013, a committee appointed by the Ministry of Health and Care Services recommended that abortion should not be allowed after 21 weeks and 6 days gestation. On 1 January 2015, the regulation on abortion was changed to say that a fetus is presumed viable at 21 weeks and 6 days, unless there are specific reasons to believe it is not.

As of 2010, the abortion rate was 16.2 abortions per 1000 women aged 15–44 years.
