= Heathen hof =

Germanic pagan temple

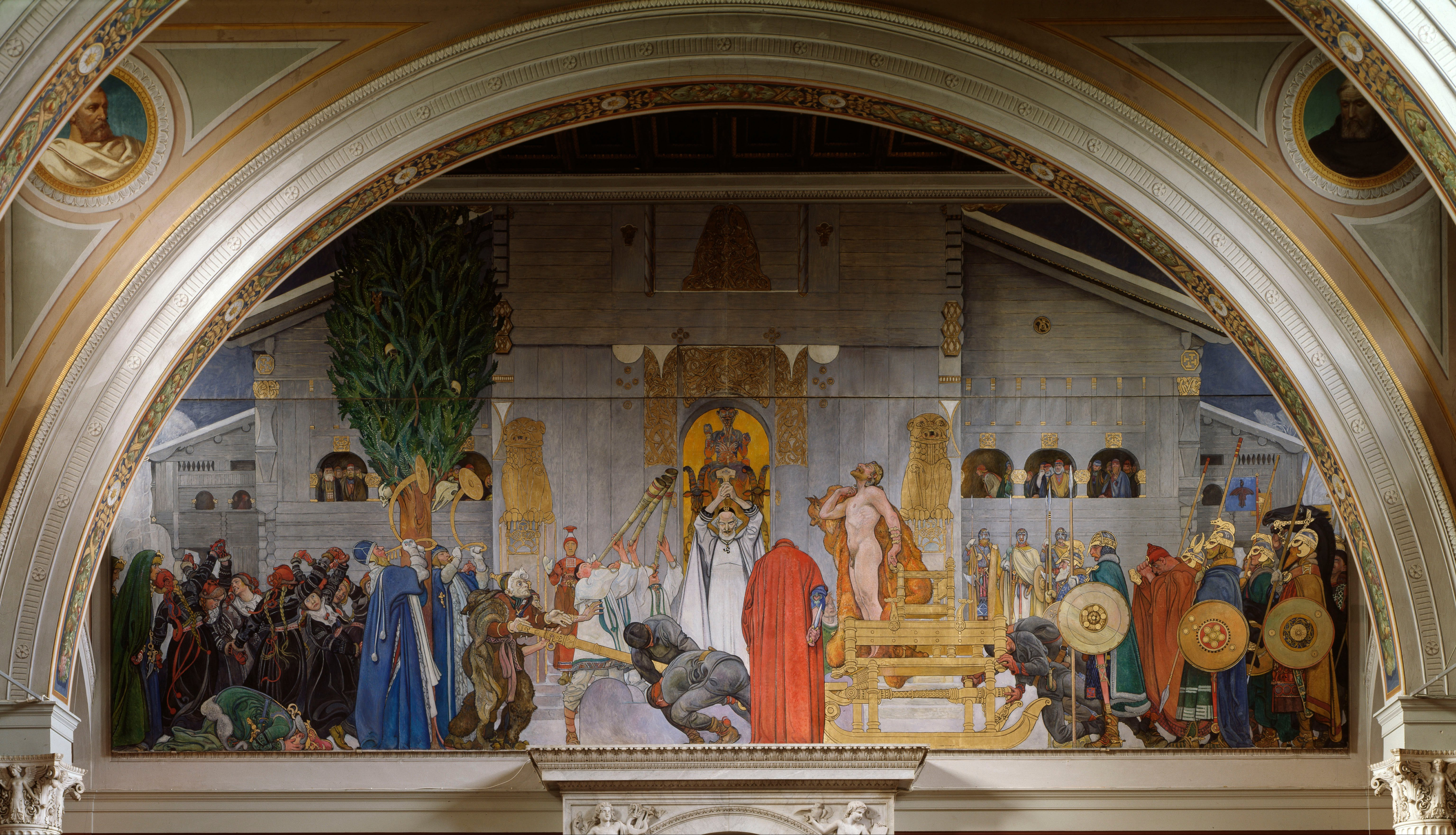
Midvinterblot (1915) by Carl Larsson: King Domalde offers himself for sacrifice before the hof at Gamla Uppsala.

A heathen hof or Germanic pagan temple is a temple building of the Germanic religion. The term hof is taken from Old Norse.

== Background ==
Etymologically, the Old Norse word hof is the same as the Dutch and German word hof, which originally meant a hall and later came to refer to a court (originally in the meaning of a royal or aristocratic court) and then also to a farm. In medieval Scandinavian sources, it occurs once as a hall, in the Eddic poem Hymiskviða, and beginning in the fourteenth century, in the "court" meaning. Otherwise, it occurs only as a word for a temple. Hof also occasionally occurs with the meaning "temple" in Old High German and is cognate with the Old English hof. In Scandinavia during the Viking Age, it appears to have displaced older terms for a sacred place, vé, hörgr, lundr, vangr, and vin, particularly in the West Norse linguistic area, namely Norway and Iceland. It is the dominant word for a temple in the Icelandic sagas, but is rare in skaldic poetry.

Many places in Scandinavia, but especially in West Norse regions, are named hof or hov, either alone or in combination. These include:

- Hov on Suðuroy, Faroe Islands
- Hof in Vestfold, Norway
- Hof, a village in Iceland
- Hov, part of Båstad Municipality in Scania, Sweden

Some placenames, often names of farms, combine the word, such as:

- Several places in Iceland named Hofstaðir, one the site of a hof excavation.
- Hofsós, village in Iceland.
- Norderhov, a former municipality in Norway - dedicated to Njörðr.
- Torshov, a neighborhood in Oslo and Thorsø, a farm in Torsnes, Norway - dedicated to Thor.

There is also one in England: the village of Hoff in Cumbria, with an associated Hoff Lund, "temple grove."

== Changing scholarly views ==
The nature of Germanic places of worship has long been a subject of scholarly debate. Tacitus wrote in Germania:

The Germans do not think it in keeping with the divine majesty to confine gods within walls or to portray them in the likeness of any human countenance. Their holy places are woods and groves, and they apply the names of deities to that hidden presence which is seen only by the eye of reverence.

There are several sites in the historical period at which heathen rites apparently took place in the open, including Hove in Trøndelag, Norway, where offerings were apparently brought to images of the gods on a row of ten posts, but no trace of buildings was found. Yet Tacitus himself wrote of an image of Nerthus. And in his Annals he refers to a temple of Tanfana. Most older scholars considered that a hof would be a dedicated temple: an independent sacred place, built specifically for ritual proceedings, comparable to a Christian church. By extension, it was also commonly believed that the hofs had been located on the same sites as the churches that had superseded them.

This was the dominant theory until in 1966 the Danish archeologist Olaf Olsen published the results of a comprehensive study of archeological investigations in Iceland and Sweden and of a large number of the oldest Danish churches. He was not able to confirm a single case of a heathen hof underlying a Christian church, and concluded in light of this that a hof could not have been an independent building. Particularly in reference to the Hofstaðir building in Iceland (see below), he suggested the model of the temple-farm: that rather than being dedicated exclusively to religious use, the hofs were also dwellings, and that the word hof referred to the great farm in a rural settlement, at which the most powerful man also held sacrifices (blótar) and feasts.

However, new archeological discoveries in the late 20th century revealed several buildings in various parts of Scandinavia that do appear to have functioned purely as cult sites. Some of them, for example the hall at Tissø, Denmark, were associated with the aristocracy, but others, for example Uppåkra in Scania (formerly in Denmark, now in Sweden) functioned as places of assembly for the local population. The temple found in England, at Yeavering, now appears to be an early example of a hall-associated hof, rather than an anomaly.

Gro Steinsland, a historian of Norse paganism, is of the opinion that in effect it was economic resources as much as local tradition that led to the development of dedicated hofs: in the richest areas, actual temples developed, while in poor areas, the spaces that people had were what they used for blót.

== Hofs in the written record ==
=== Iceland and Norway ===
In the first chapter, in in heiðnu lǫg, of book four of Landnámabók (Hauksbók) it is stated that Iceland was divided into four courtdistricts all containing three hofs each.

==== Sagas of the Icelanders ====
Chapter 2 of Kjalnesinga saga contains an extended description of Thorgrim Helgason's temple at Hof:

He had a large temple built in his hayfield, a hundred feet long and sixty wide. Everybody had to pay a temple fee. Thor was the god most honoured there. It was rounded on the inside, like a vault, and there were windows and wall-hangings everywhere. The image of Thor stood in the center, with other gods on both sides. In front of them was an altar made with great skill and covered with iron on the top. On this there was to be a fire which would never go out—they called it sacred fire. On the altar was to lie a great armband, made of silver. The temple godi was to wear it on his arm at all gatherings, and everyone was to swear oaths on it whenever a suit was brought. A great copper bowl was to stand on the altar, and into it was to go all the blood which came from animals or men given to Thor. They called this sacrificial blood [hlaut] and the sacrificial blood bowl [hlautbolli]. This blood was to be sprinkled over men and animals, and the animals that were given in sacrifice were to be used for feasting when sacrificial banquets were held. Men whom they sacrificed were to be cast into a pool which was outside by the door; they called it Blótkelda (Well of Sacrifice).

There is a similar passage in Eyrbyggja saga about Thorolf Mostrarskegg's temple at Hofstaðir, which gives more information about the layout of the hof:

There he had a temple built, and it was a sizeable building, with a door on the side-wall near the gable. The high-seat pillars were placed inside the door, and nails, that were called holy nails [reginnaglar], were driven into them. Beyond that point, the temple was a sanctuary. At the inner end there was a structure similar to the choir in churches nowadays and there was a raised platform in the middle of the floor like an altar, where a ring weighing twenty ounces and fashioned without a join was placed, and all oaths had to be sworn on this ring. It also had to be worn by the temple priest at all public gatherings. A sacrificial bowl [hlautbolli] was placed on the platform and in it a sacrificial twig [hlautteinn]—like a priest's aspergillum—which was used to sprinkle blood from the bowl. This blood, which was called sacrificial blood [hlaut], was the blood of live animals offered to the gods. The gods were placed around the platform in the choir-like structure within the temple. All farmers had to pay a toll to the temple . . . . The temple godi was responsible for the upkeep of the temple and ensuring it was maintained properly, as well as for holding sacrificial feasts in it.

==== Heimskringla ====
Snorri Sturluson's description in Heimskringla of the process of blót repeats the same information about the blood and the bowl, and continues:

. . . and with [the hlautteinar] were to be smeared all over with blood the pedestals of the idols and also the walls of the temple within and without; and likewise the men present were to be sprinkled with blood. But the meat of the animals was to be boiled and to serve as food at the banquet. Fires were to be lighted in the middle of the temple floor, and kettles hung over them. The sacrificial beaker was to be borne around the fire.

Jan de Vries considered the 100 by 60 foot dimensions and the eternal flame exaggerated; the human sacrifices in a pool by the door, not so much.

Several sagas, including Kjalnesinga saga, also mention hofs being surrounded by a fence.

=== Sweden ===
==== Gamla Uppsala ====
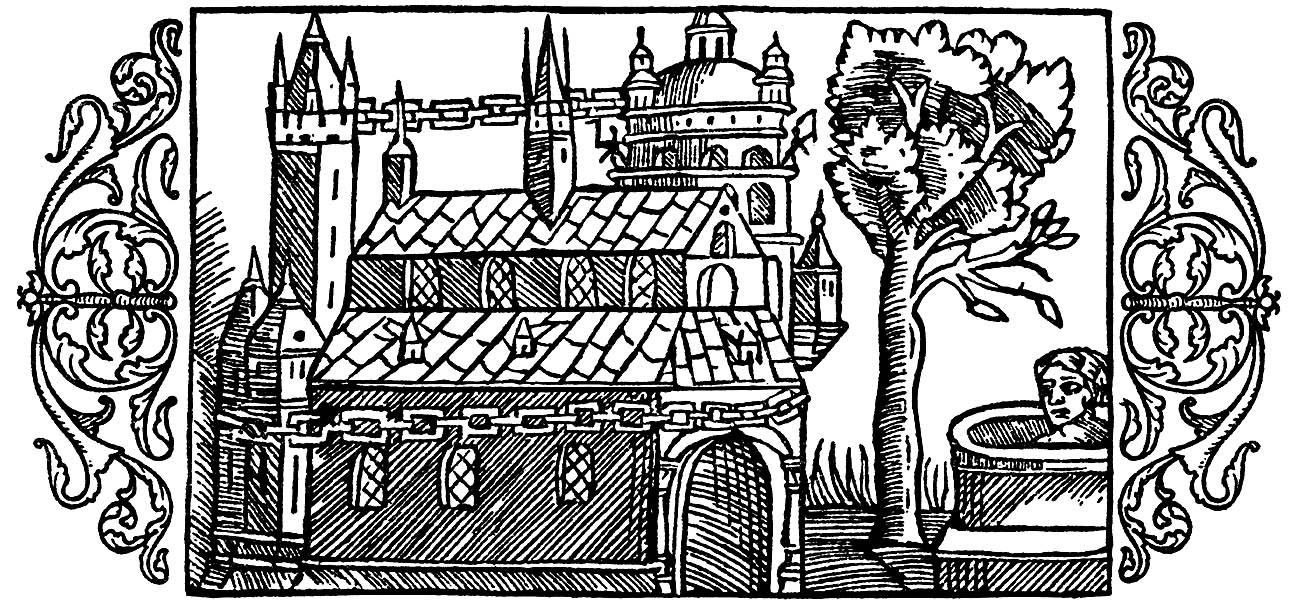
A woodcut depicting the Temple at Uppsala as described by Adam of Bremen, including the golden chain around the temple, the well and the tree, from Olaus Magnus' Historia de Gentibus Septentrionalibus (1555).

A Viking Age heathen hof at Gamla Uppsala ("Old Uppsala") in Sweden was described by Adam of Bremen around 1070:

That folk has a very famous temple called Uppsala . . . . In this temple, entirely decked out in gold, the people worship the statues of three gods in such wise that the mightiest of them, Thor, occupies a throne in the middle of the chamber; Wotan and Frikko [presumably Freyr] have places on either side. The significance of these gods is as follows: Thor, they say, presides over the air, which governs the thunder and lightning, the winds and rains, fair weather and crops. The other, Wotan—that is, the Furious—carries on war and imparts to man strength against his enemies. The third is Frikko, who bestows peace and pleasure on mortals. His likeness, too, they fashion with an immense phallus. But Wotan they chisel armed, as our people are wont to represent Mars. Thor with his scepter apparently resembles Jove . . . . For all the gods there are appointed priests to offer sacrifices for the people. If plague and famine threaten, a libation is poured to the idol Thor; if war, to Wotan, if marriages are to be celebrated, to Frikko.

A note or scholion appended to this passage adds the following description:

A golden chain goes round the temple. It hangs over the gable of the building and sends its glitter far off to those who approach, because the shrine stands on level ground with mountains all about it like a theater.

Another scholion describes natural features near the hof:

Near this temple stands a very large tree with wide-spreading branches, always green winter and summer. What kind it is nobody knows. There is also a spring at which the pagans are accustomed to make their sacrifices, and into it to plunge a live man. And if he is not found, the people's wish will be granted.

Rather than a single tree, the passage that follows on the great sacrifices held every nine years at Uppsala speaks of a sacred grove adjoining the hof, of which each and every tree is sacred and in which the human and animal victims are hanged.

Adam's presumed source, Sweyn Estridsen, was in service as a young man (from 1026 to 1038) with King Anund Jakob of Sweden, and therefore had the opportunity to personally see the hof at Uppsala. But we do not know how accurately Adam reports what he said. Accuracy concerning heathenry was not his objective in writing his history.

=== England ===
==== Goodmanham ====
In his Historia ecclesiastica gentis Anglorum (Ecclesiastical History of the English People), Bede describes the conversion of King Edwin of Northumbria. His high-priest, Coifi, convinced that Christianity is a better way, volunteers to personally lead the destruction of the temple and its idols, which Bede says was located at Goodmanham, just east of York:

So he . . . asked the king to give him arms and a stallion—for hitherto it had not been lawful for the Chief Priest to carry arms or to ride anything but a mare. . . . Girded with a sword and with a spear in his hand, he mounted the king's stallion and rode up to the idols. . . . [W]ithout hesitation, as soon as he reached the shrine, he cast into it the spear he carried and thus profaned it. Then . . . he told his companions to set fire to the shrine and its enclosures and destroy them. . . . Here it was that the Chief Priest . . . desecrated and destroyed the altars that he had himself dedicated.

== Archaeological record ==
=== Denmark ===
==== Tissø ====
In the 1990s, Danish archaeologists excavated a chieftain's residence on the outskirts of Tissø in West Zealand County. Among other finds, they uncovered the remains of a large longhouse or hall that was in use between the 6th and 11th centuries C.E. It was apparent from the postholes that the roof had been supported by a few very strong columns and that the building had been tall, possibly two-story. It contained a large central room, where a large number of animal bones, fragments of Frankish glass beakers, and a piece of a string instrument were found. These finds indicate with a high degree of likelihood that the hall was used for ceremonial feasts. In addition, large numbers of offered items were found in the area, among others a huge gold ring, amulets with mythological motifs, and animal bones. Etymologically, the name Tissø would mean "Tyr's Lake" or "God's Lake". These finds all suggest that the entire complex was an important religious center.

Other finds in the area, for example weapons and jewelry, show that the site was associated with the highest strata of society, possibly with the royal family. The entire complex, which also included workshops and a marketplace, may have functioned as a temporary residence for the king when he made periodic visits to that part of the kingdom. Investigations have shown that the complex was only in use for short periods. The king also functioned as a religious leader, and the hof was used for the feasts and blóts that were held when the king was at the location. Similar complexes of buildings are known from other places in southern Scandinavia, for example Järrestad in Scania, Lisbjerg in Jutland, and Toftegård on Zealand. These royal centers, called central places by archeologists, perhaps also constituted a parallel to the royal palaces of the Merovingian, Carolingian, and Holy Roman Emperors, such as Charlemagne's palace complex at Aachen. These also included religious buildings, marketplaces, and workshops that were primarily used when the peripatetic court was in residence.

=== Iceland ===
==== Hofstaðir ====
The name of the settlement of Hofstaðir, near Mývatn, and local tradition indicate it was the site of a hof. The site was excavated by Daniel Bruun in 1908 and again by Olaf Olsen in 1965. Since 1991, the Icelandic Archeological Institute (Fornleifastofnun Íslands - FSI) has re-investigated it; since 2002, in an international investigation under the Landscape of Settlements program. The excavations have uncovered a large longhouse with a small separate room at the north end, 42 meters long overall and 8 meters wide in the main section. It had three small protruding sections, two near the south end and one on the opposite side. There was a fireplace in the center and smaller fireplaces at both ends of the main room. Animal bones were found all around the inside of the walls in the main room, and a smaller number in the small room. Various associated buildings have also been excavated.

Olsen used Hofstaðir as a particularly good example of the idea of the temple-farm. Despite its large size, in form the building is identical to other longhouses, the small room at the north end was a later addition, and the 1908 excavation had not fully revealed the entrances, annexes, and ancillary buildings. He considered it primarily a farmhouse and only incidentally a hof. However, in addition to clarifying the relationship between the annexes and the main hall, the re-excavation revealed even more bone fragments, and analysis shows that at least 23 cattle had been sacrificial offerings. They were killed in an unusual manner, by a blow between the eyes, and their skulls displayed outside for years. The horns had not been removed and in age the animals ranged from just full-grown to middle-aged, both of these being unique in Icelandic farming at the time; also the majority appear to have been bulls, which is very surprising in a dairy economy. The dates of the skulls varied, with the last having been slaughtered around 1000 C.E., and one sheep skeleton was found that had been killed in the same manner as the cattle. The bone finds thus indicate the building did indeed serve as a hof. So do the surprisingly small size of the main hearth despite the great size of the building; the relatively few finds of valuable objects (and complete lack of weapons), and the location, which is convenient for travel and highly visible, but not good for a farmstead. Hence, the unusual evidence of frequent meat feasting does not simply indicate a particularly wealthy settlement, but a place of frequent ritual gatherings, probably in spring and summer. The unusual method of slaughter was deliberately dramatic and would have produced a fountain of blood. The skulls were found among roof and wall debris, all but one grouped in two places at the south end of the hall: inside the southeast annex and between the southwestern annex and the wall of the main building; it seems plausible that they were on display when the building was in use and that where they were found was storage, whether normal winter storage or concealment after conversion to Christianity caused the abandonment of the building in the mid-eleventh century. The goat sacrifice can be interpreted as a termination ritual.

Olsen also regarded as highly significant that only 9 meters from the south door of the building was an oval pit containing ash, charcoal, fragments of animal bone, and sooty stones. He pointed out that Icelandic farms usually disposed of their refuse down a slope, and interpreted this as a very large baking pit.

==== Sæból and other reputed square hof sites ====
A number of square ruins in Iceland, above all one at Sæból, were interpreted as the remains of hofs, but Olsen demonstrated that they are identical in form and scale with horse stalls still in use in Iceland. He ascribed the hof legends attached to them to romantic nationalism and pointed out that many were called medieval chapels (bænhús) at the beginning of the 19th century and had transformed into ruined hofs by the end of that century.

=== Sweden ===
==== Uppåkra ====
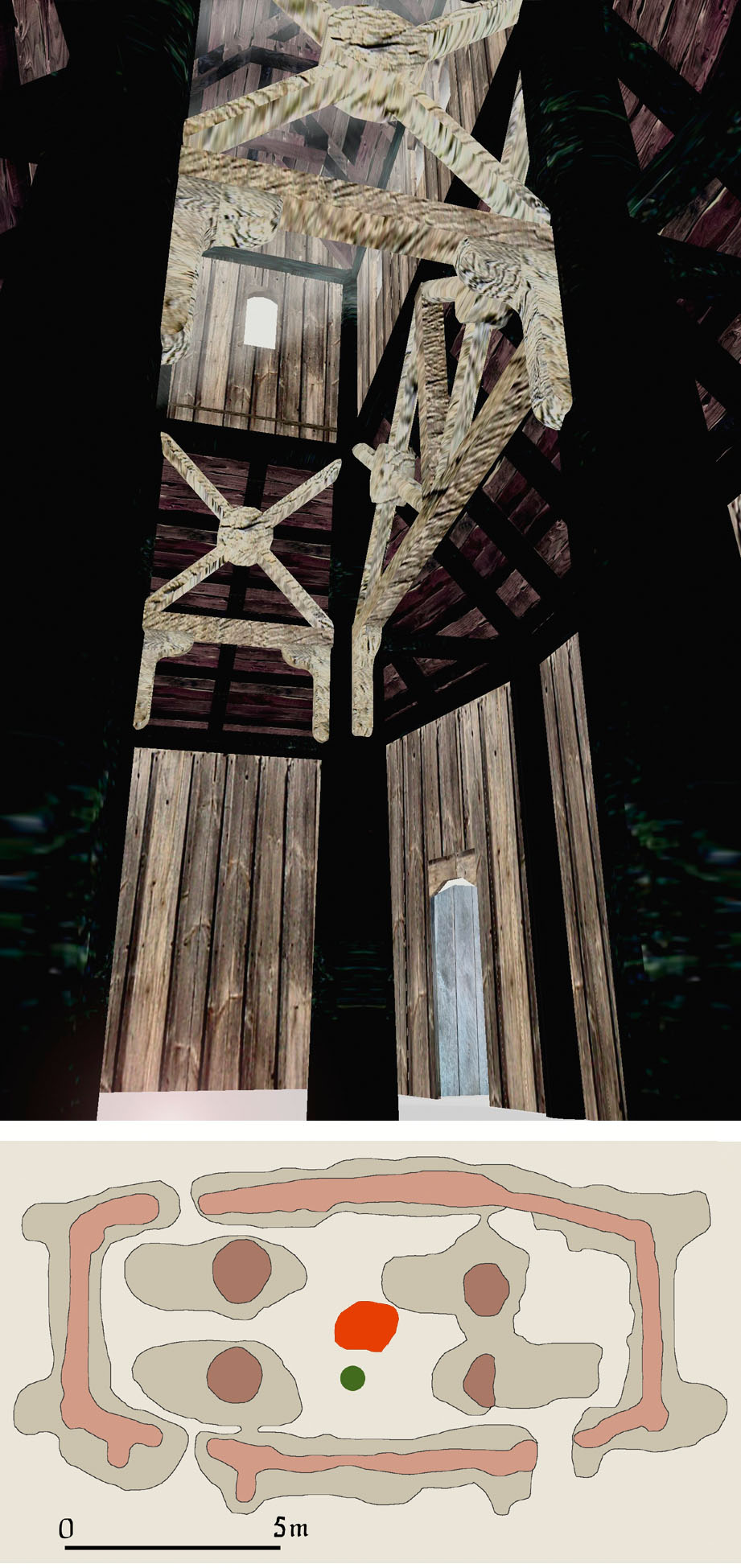
Hof at Uppåkra. Top: interior as reconstructed by Foteviken Museum; bottom: plan of excavation, showing locations of wall trenches (pink), central columns (brown), hearth (red), and beaker and glass bowl (green). By Sven Rosborn.

In 2000–2004, excavations in Uppåkra, south of Lund in Scania, revealed that a heathen hof was located there for several hundred years. Since it was possible to excavate the entire site and since it had not been disturbed, this excavation afforded the first opportunity for a purely archeological study of a heathen hof in its entirety.

The remains of the building consist of holes and trenches for the placement of the pillars and walls that once stood there. Various floor levels were discernible, and it was possible to determine that the hof was initially erected in the 3rd century C.E. on the site of an unusually large longhouse, and then rebuilt six times without appreciable changes, the last version of the building dating to the early Viking Age. The building material was in all cases wood, which was also sunk into the ground.

The building was not large, only 13 meters long and 6.5 meters wide. The walls on the long sides were made of slightly convex, rough-cut oak posts or "staves," which were sunk into a trench in the earth more than one meter deep. At each corner of the building stood a pillar or corner-post. The central part of the building, which stood free of the outer walls, was formed by four gigantic wooden columns. The holes for these and for the corner-posts are unusually wide and more than two meters deep, and stone packing found in three of the center holes indicates columns at least 0.7 meters in diameter.

The building had three entrances, two in the south and one in the north. Each opening had hefty posts on either side, and the southwestern had a projecting section in addition. That must therefore have been the main entrance of the hof. This has been interpreted as the men's entrance, the entrance on the north side as the women's entrance, and the southeastern entrance as for the priest, on the model of stone churches.

Two large iron door rings were found, one in the fill around a post, the other about 10 meters from the building.

The hof is near the center of the settlement and there are at least four burial mounds to the west and north of it, probably dating to the early Bronze Age or the early Iron Age.

==== Lunda ====
At Lunda farm in Södermanland, excavation revealed a small building parallel to the north side of a longhouse, with three phallic figurines inside, one solid gold, the other two cast in bronze and gilded. This is thought to have been a hof associated with the longhouse residence. In addition, a nearby hillside appears to have been a sacred grove: numerous settings of crushed stone and fire sites were found all over it, and evenly distributed on, under, and around them, large amounts of burned and crushed bone, burned and crushed clay fragments, and resin drops, and smaller numbers of beads and blades such as knives and arrowheads. The bone fragments were very worn, indicating they had been left exposed or possibly ground, and the very few that could be identified were from pigs and either sheep or goats.

==== Borg ====
At Borg in Norrköping Municipality, Östergötland, a small building was excavated that had two rooms on either side of a central hallway. There was a stone foundation interpreted as a hörgr at the far end of the hallway from the entrance. Two amulet rings were found near this and 98 amulet rings and 75 kg of unburned animal bones, including numerous skulls and jawbones, were found in the paved area in front of the entrance, suggesting the building had been used for ritual feasts. In the eleventh century the building and its yard had been covered with a thick layer of gravel and a church erected 100 m away.

==== Gamla Uppsala ====
In a 1926 excavation, Sune Lindqvist found at least three levels of previous occupation under and immediately to the north of the church at Gamla Uppsala. In the layer immediately underlying the church, dated to approximately 900 C.E., he found post-holes that he interpreted as the remains of the great hof described by Adam of Bremen. He interpreted them as two concentric rectangles, the remains of an almost square building with a high roof. However, as Olsen demonstrated, the remains are too sparse to support this interpretation, which is in any case based on Carl Schuchhardt's reconstruction of the Wendish temple at Arkona, a later and non-Germanic site. Moreover, Schuchhardt's excavation was rushed and his own data do not certainly support the square plan that he later claimed to have found at two other Baltic sites.

Further excavations at Gamla Uppsala in the 1990s uncovered remains of a large settlement and a very large hall near the church, which has been identified as a hall hof, either "a feasting hall in which pagan festivals took place at certain times" or, based on its lack of internal divisions, a ritual space based in overall form on the long house.

=== Norway ===
==== Mære ====
Under the medieval Mære Church in Mære in Trøndelag county, archeological investigation in the 1960s revealed remnants of a hof, the only one found under a Norwegian church. The building had been of post construction, and gullgubber were found in one post-hole.

==== Hov ====
At Hov in Vingrom near Lake Mjøsa in southern Norway, excavations of a 15-metre (49 ft) longhouse have revealed gullgubber and "strike-a-lights," suggesting cultic use. The as yet unpublished site is identified as a 6th-7th century building that was part of a farm and apparently was never used as a residence, and so far has yielded 29 gullgubber, a half-dozen strike-a-lights, a scramasax dated to approximately 550 C.E., pearls, knives, and a ring-nail.

==== Ranheim ====
In 2011, remains of a site of heathen worship were found at Ranheim on the outskirts of Trondheim, consisting of a stone circle approximately 15 metres (49 ft) in diameter and 1 metre (3 ft 3 in) in height delineating an altar, a ceremonial way marked by standing stones, and a building about 5.3 by 4.5 metres (17 ft × 15 ft) in size, consisting of 12 large pillars resting on stone bases and enclosing 4 pillars. The building is thought to have been a shelter for the god-images which were mounted on the inside pillars. The site dates to about 400 CE, during the Nordic Iron Age, and had been covered with earth to conceal it. Several human teeth, a partial skull, and two glass beads were found, but no gullgubber. The site was later bulldozed to make way for housing.

==== Ørsta ====
In late summer and early autumn 2020, during archeological survey for a build site, remains of a building with size 14 by 7 metres (46 ft × 23 ft) with slightly curved walls marked by large postholes was found at Ose on the outskirts of Ørsta in Ørsta Municipality in Møre og Romsdal county. It is located 150 metres (490 ft) from the current shore of the local Ørstafjorden. The building was remarkable in that it in its centre, a quadratic-shaped structure had four holes for round pillars which is interpreted as holding up a central spire, similar to Uppåkra. The longer side walls had probably rectangular heavier roof carrying posts with a size of about 40 by 40 centimetres (16 in × 16 in). It is interpreted as being a hof. In one of the pillars of the building a part of an iron plough was found. This is interpreted as an offering for a place of worship. Remains of fireplaces was found in the building thought to be used in heathen ceremonies. The burnt remains of pillars were C-14 carbon dated in 2021 to be from the period 970-990 CE, late Viking age.

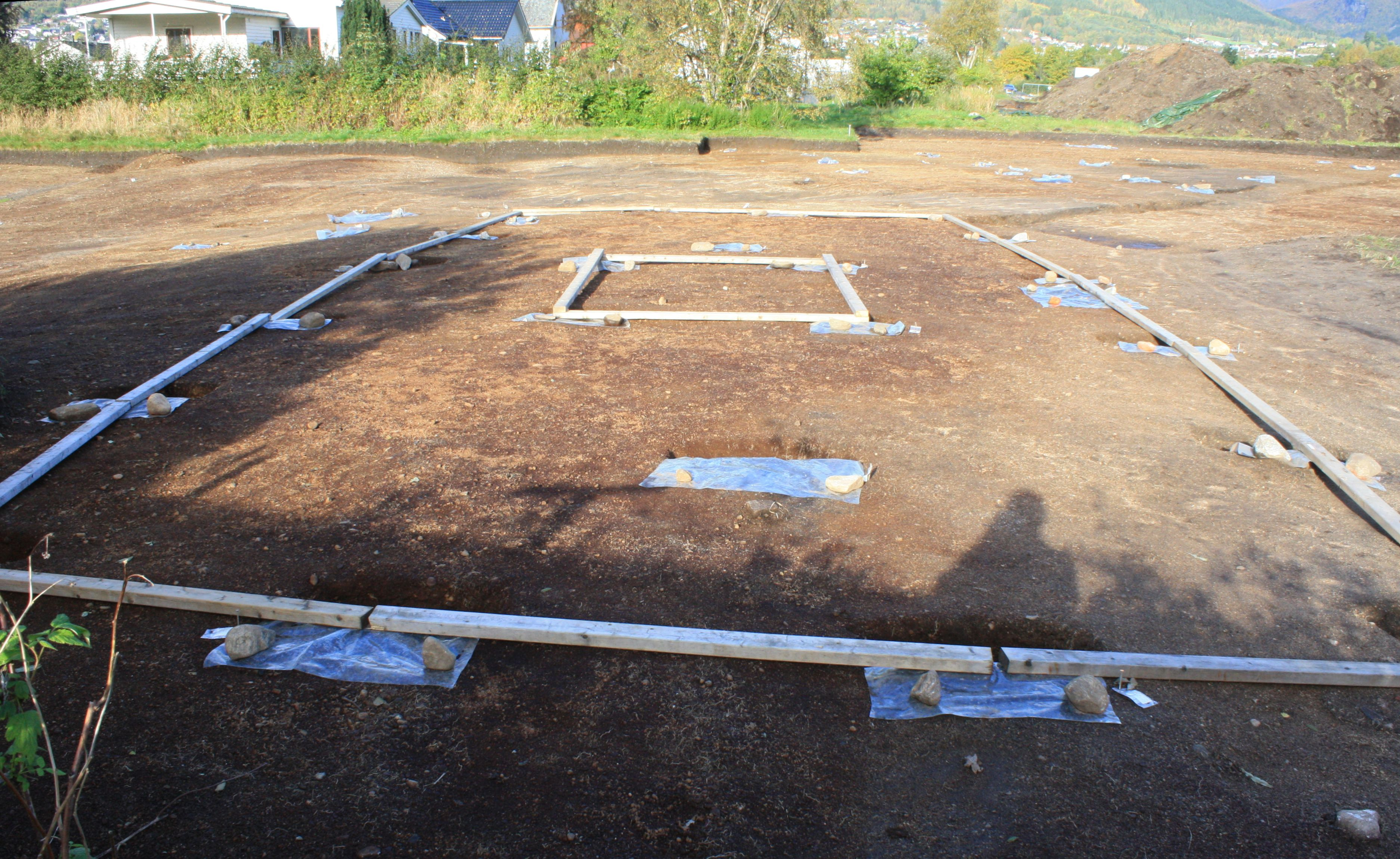
The dig out with postholes of the assumed Viking age Hof at Ose in Ørsta, Norway

Another building, round and smaller in size, marked again by holes for its posts was also found during these excavations about 100 m northeast of the first, slightly more distant from current shore. It seems to be of a similar age around year 900. It is thought to be a hörgr. Part of a grinding stone found at its location is interpreted again as a religious offering for a sacred place. A number of other buildings from three time periods were found at the site, pointing to an important central farm site, Ose, which was located here at least from 500 years before CE.

=== England ===
==== Yeavering ====
The only heathen temple site yet found in England is at Yeavering, Northumberland, which seems to correspond to Bede's Ad Gefrin.

Between 1952 and 1962, Brian Hope-Taylor directed an excavation of the site. This was a royal residence of the Anglo-Saxon kings of Northumbria, but Hope-Taylor emphasized that as implied by its Celtic name, its history began far back in the post-Romano-British past; the "Great Enclosure" on the eastern edge of the site, in his opinion, had most likely been created in the 4th or 5th century C.E., possibly earlier, and only one of the burials on the site could reasonably be claimed to be Anglo-Saxon rather than indigenous Celtic, and that mainly on grounds of the individual's unusual height. In his view the archeological evidence was "preponderantly Celtic." However, he also identified the buildings he found as the product of a "vigorous hybrid culture" and regarded the buildings with solid walls in foundation trenches as "Saxo-Frisian" halls constructed by native [Celtic] craftsmen; in construction they are very early examples of a technique later found widely in important buildings, including churches, in both Anglo-Saxon England and on the Continent, but at this time otherwise only found on Iona and near Yeavering, at Milfield, while in form they closely resemble buildings excavated west of the Weser.

Among these trench-built solid-walled buildings were three that lay some distance west of the great hall, with the amphitheatrical structure Hope-Taylor referred to as the assembly-structure lying between them: a pair of rectangular buildings placed end to end with what appears to have been a wattle fence between them, and an associated building that Hope-Taylor interpreted as a kitchen. These three were the only buildings on the site oriented north-south rather than east-west, and were constructed at the same time as or shortly before the assembly-structure. They were destroyed along with the Great Enclosure around 633, after which a church was built at the east end of the site. The southern building of the pair Hope-Taylor was convinced was a temple. No pottery or other indications of normal domestic use were found in this building. Nor were scattered animal bones. The building had been constructed in two stages: the second was constructed around the first (which was one of the few buildings on the site not to have been burned down), using carefully finished carpentry and heavy buttresses similar to those of the great hall. Inside the inner wall, the trench had been left open or opened up to form a pit approximately 6 feet long and more than 1 foot wide, which was full of animal bones; these had been deposited in at least 9 layers and stacked against the wall above the pit after space ran out, and there were half again as many as were found elsewhere on the site. They were mostly bones of oxen, with an extremely high proportion of skulls, and evidently had mostly been slaughtered as young calves, when their meat would be tender, rather than either shortly after birth when male calves would be surplus to dairy farming or after reaching full growth and being usable as draft animals. There were three non-structural postholes from which the posts had been removed before the building was burned and demolished. In addition, outside the northwest corner of the building there was a pit 4 feet in depth in which a post had been placed; nothing was found here except unusually clayey soil compared to the rest of the site, and crushed animal teeth, probably from sheep or goats; numerous thin, pointed stakes had been driven into the ground around this feature. And south of the pit, on the west side of the building, were traces of the successive erection of at least four temporary huts. A smaller, similar set of traces lay to the west of the screen between that building and the one to the north. South of the temple building was a rectangular enclosure that appeared to have been unroofed. There was no door out to this area from the building; both buildings had doors on their two long, east and west sides. Finally, of the graves in the western cemetery area of the site, the northernmost 16 were grouped around the temple building; but no burials lay to the east of the enclosure, suggesting that was where the gate was. All but one body, a child who was buried doubled-over, were buried with their heads to the west. Hope-Taylor considered the burials associated with free-standing posts beside the building and pointed out that although the form of burial—stretched out and without grave goods—would have been acceptable to Christians, the dating and association with the un-Christian building mean that at least some of the burials must have occurred during heathen times.

== Stave churches ==
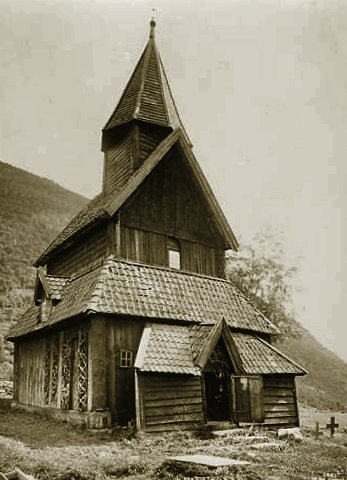
View of Urnes stave church by Axel Lindahl, 1880s, with the ancient portal in the north wall

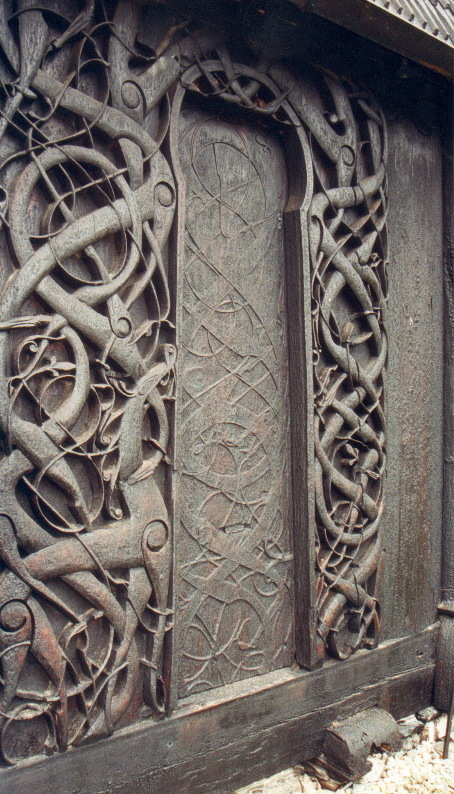
Ancient portal of Urnes stave church (photograph by Nina Aldin Thune)

The unusual medieval stave churches of Norway and Sweden were constructed using a later version of the upright stave technique seen at Yeavering and Uppåkra, often have runic graffiti and very old-fashioned decorative carving, and the oldest, at Urnes, has preserved in one wall two ancient door panels featuring the motif of the gripping beast that were evidently felt to be too pagan to continue to be prominently displayed. Many have thought that hofs probably looked like the early stave churches. However, although excavations have found the remains of earlier palisade churches under many medieval Scandinavian churches, including two predecessors under the Urnes church, only under the church at Mære have traces of a heathen hof been found. In particular Olsen investigated the notion that the earliest Scandinavian churches were built over the hofs, and found it not substantiated. However, he did see no other source for the main stylistic characteristics of the stave-church – "the striving for height, the raised central roof and the surrounding gallery at ground level" – than indigenous Norwegian buildings, since the main influence on early Norwegian Christianity was Anglo-Saxon England, where stave churches were not built. But Olsen believed buildings like the first Urnes church would have been too small to accommodate heathen sacrifice and feasting, and no smaller hofs had yet been discovered, so he believed all hofs were longhouse temple-farms.

One Anglo-Saxon church, however, arguably is a stave-church: that at Greensted in Essex. Also, some of the earliest Anglo-Saxon churches consisted only of wooden towers, to which naves were added only later in the Middle Ages, for example at Earls Barton. These have sometimes been compared to stave churches, especially those with a central raised section, and many of the stave churches have been elongated or made cruciform from an originally square plan. For example, the reconstructed Øye Stave Church is square, and the traces of the earlier church under Ringebu stave church show an almost square building.

== Modern hofs ==
Some buildings have been constructed or adapted as hofs by modern heathens.

- At Midsummer 2014 the Odinist Fellowship dedicated a former Tudor chapel as a hof at Newark-on-Trent, Nottinghamshire, England.
- In Iceland, the Ásatrúarfélagið began construction in 2015 of hof Ásatrúarfélagsins, an oval building set into a hillside near Reykjavík Airport, designed by Magnus Jensson, an architect who is an Ásatrú member. As of 2023 the hof is still under construction following numerous delays.
- In the north of Iceland, construction of the Ásheimur Temple began in 2010 on the land of Árni Sverrisson. It has been in use since 2014
- In 2015, the Asatru Folk Assembly dedicated Odinshof in Brownsville, California.
- In 2016, the hof Manheim was established on the island of Funen in Denmark.
- In 2020, the Asatru Folk Assembly dedicated Thorshof in Linden, North Carolina.
- In 2020, the Asatru Folk Assembly dedicated Baldrshof in Murdock, Minnesota.
- In 2022, the Asatru Folk Assembly dedicated Njordshof in White Springs, Florida.
- In 2022, the Asatru Folk Assembly procured land in Jackson County, Tennessee, on which to create Sigrheim, which will include a permanent community of Asatruar and a hof to Týr, "Týrshof".

== Sources ==
- Gunnar Andersson, L. Beronius Jörperland, J. Dunés. "Gudarnas gård: Tre fallosfiguriner från Lunda i Strängnäs socken, Södermanland." Fornvännen 98, 124-26. 2003.
- Lars Jørgensen. "Hov og hørg ved Tissø." In Torsten Capelle, Christian Fischer, Karen M. Boe eds. Ragnarok: Odins verden. Silkeborg: Silkeborg Museum, 2005. OCLC 68385544
- Gavin Lucas, ed. Hofstaðir: Investigations of a Viking-Age Feasting-Hall in North-Eastern Iceland. Reykjavík: Fornleifastofnun Íslands, 2009.
- Sven Rosborn. Den skånska Historien: Vikingarna. Höllviken: Fotevikens Museum, 2004. ISBN 91-973777-1-6
- Gro Steinsland. Norrøn religion: myter, riter, samfunn. Oslo: Pax, 2005. ISBN 82-530-2607-2
