= Oluf Kalips =

Oluf Petersson Kalips (c.1520–1592) was a Norwegian nobleman, landowner and Chancellor of Norway.

He was knighted in 1550 and served as Chancellor of Norway (Norges rikes kansler) in the years 1565–1567. During the Nordic Seven Years' War (1563–1570) between Denmark-Norway and Sweden, he held various assignments within the Royal Danish-Norwegian Navy. He was a notable landowner and held numerous aristocratic estates, including Thorsø in Østfold and Arneberg at Åsnes in Hedmark.

== Related Reading ==
- Kongsrud, Helge (1984) Den kongelige arveretten til Norge 1536-1661: Ide og politisk instrument (Universitetsforlaget) ISBN 978-8200067771
