= Tove Mohr =

Norwegian women's rights activist (1891–1981)

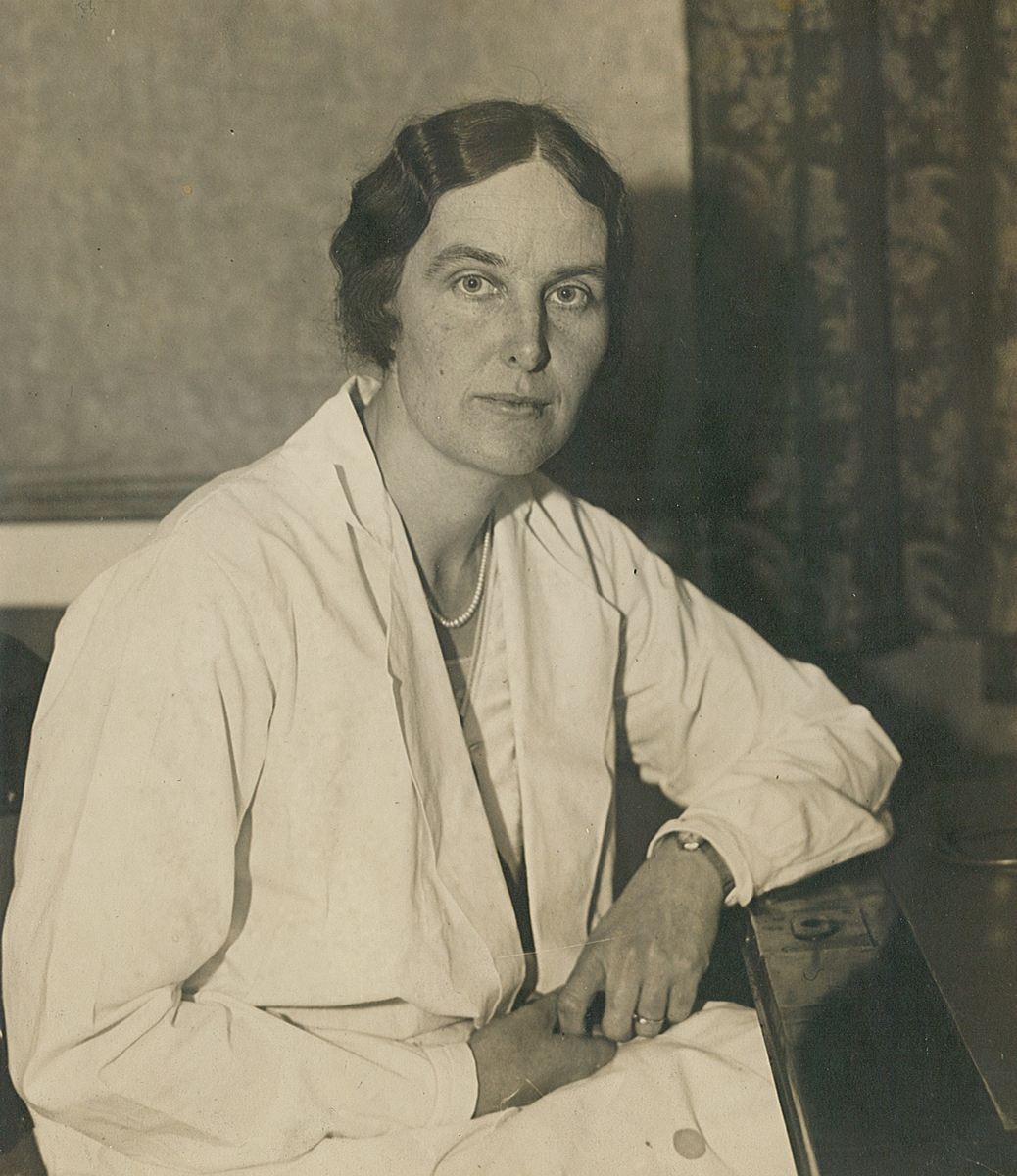
- Born: Tove Kathrine Møller; 3 March 1891; Thorsø, Norway
- Died: 26 August 1981 (aged 90)
- Occupation: Physician
- Known for: Proponent for women's rights
- Spouse: Otto Lous Mohr
- Parent(s): Katti Anker Møller; Kai Møller

Tove Kathrine Mohr (née Møller) (3 March 1891 – 26 August 1981) was a Norwegian physician, socialist, and proponent for women's rights.

== Biography ==
Tove Kathrine Møller was born at Thorsø in Østfold, Norway. She was the eldest of three children born to Katti Anker Møller and Kai Møller. Her father was a member of the Norwegian Parliament and her mother was a pioneer women's right advocate. She was raised on the family estate, Thorsø Manor (Thorsø herregård) in Torsnes. She attended Ragna Nielsens pikeskole in Kristiania (now Oslo). She began studying medicine in 1910 and graduated from the medical department at the Rikshospitalet in 1917.

In 1914, she was married to professor Otto Lous Mohr with whom she had three children, including Tove Pihl.

In 1922, she started private practice. From 1928-31, she was a teacher in physiology and health care at the State School of Education at Stabekk. In addition to her professional work as physician, Mohr was politically active. She had a number of public positions. She was member of a number of governmental commissions for preparing law revisions.

She also wrote a biography about her mother: Katti Anker Møller: en banebryter.

== Related reading ==
- Mohr, Tove (1976) Katti Anker Møller: en banebryter (Tiden Norsk Forlag) ISBN 9788210012587
- Grande, Odd (1961) Kai Møller : Herren til Thorsø (Oslo : Gyldendal)
