= Tove Pihl =

Norwegian politician (1924–1987)

Tove Agnethe Pihl (21 December 1924 – 20 January 1987) was a Norwegian educator and politician for the Labour Party.

She was born in Kristiania as the daughter of professor in medicine Otto Lous Mohr and the noted activist Tove Mohr. Her maternal grandmother was Katti Anker Møller. Tove Pihl graduated with a Bachelor of Arts degree in psychology from the University of Rochester in 1948, and with a Master of Arts degree in pedagogy from the University of Chicago in 1949. She then worked as a school teacher and rector in Oslo, and was a member of the city school board from 1956.

She was elected to the Norwegian Parliament from Oslo in 1969, but was not re-elected in 1973. During her term, she was a member of the Standing Committee of Justice.

Pihl also chaired the Norwegian Movement for Vietnam from 1973 to 1974, and was a member of the board of Nei til Atomvåpen from 1980 to 1986. She was also a member of the board of Barnevernsakademiet i Oslo from 1965 to 1973, Statens Sykepleierskole from 1974 to 1981, and the Norwegian Institute of International Affairs from 1978 to 1982.
