= Tose (disambiguation) =

Tose is a Japanese video game developer.

Tose may refer to:

- Leonard Tose (1915–2003), businessman
- Toše Proeski (1981–2007), Macedonian singer
- An alternate name for Thorsø, Norway
