= Þórsnes =

Þórsnes is the Old Norse for "Thor's headland". It may refer to:

- Þórsnes, Iceland; see Stykkishólmur
- Torsnes, Norway
- Elise Thorsnes (born 1988), Norwegian footballer
