= Katti Anker Møller =

Norwegian women's rights activist

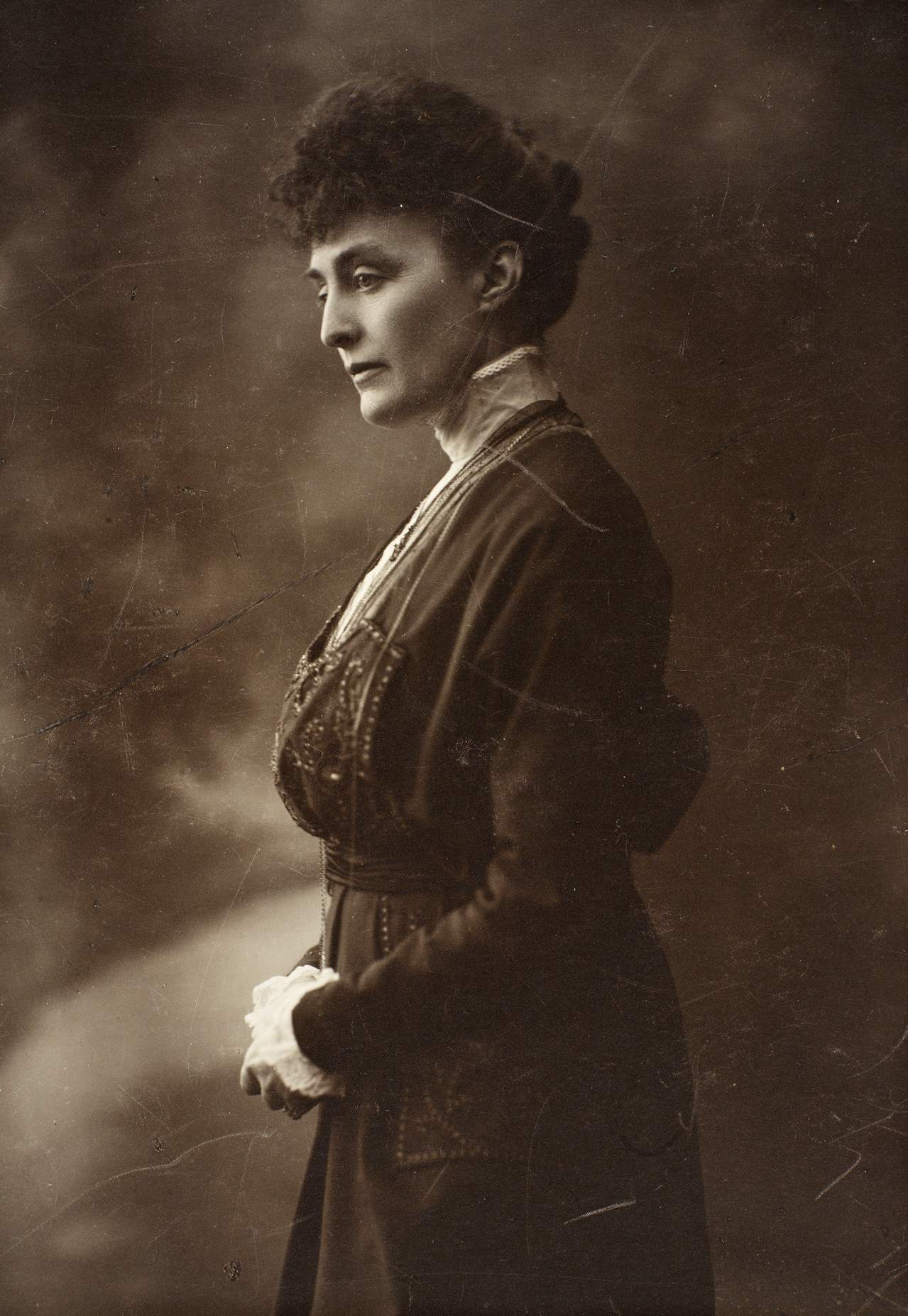
- Katti Anker Møller, c. 1910
- Born: Cathrine Anker; 23 October 1868; Hamar in Hedmark, Norway
- Died: 20 August 1945 (aged 76); Torsnes in Østfold, Norway
- Occupations: Children's rights advocate, reproductive rights pioneer, lecturer
- Spouse: Kai Møller (m. 1889; died 1940)
- Children: Tove Mohr
- Parent: Herman Anker

Signature
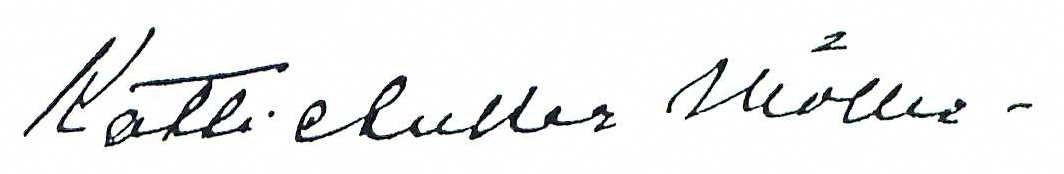

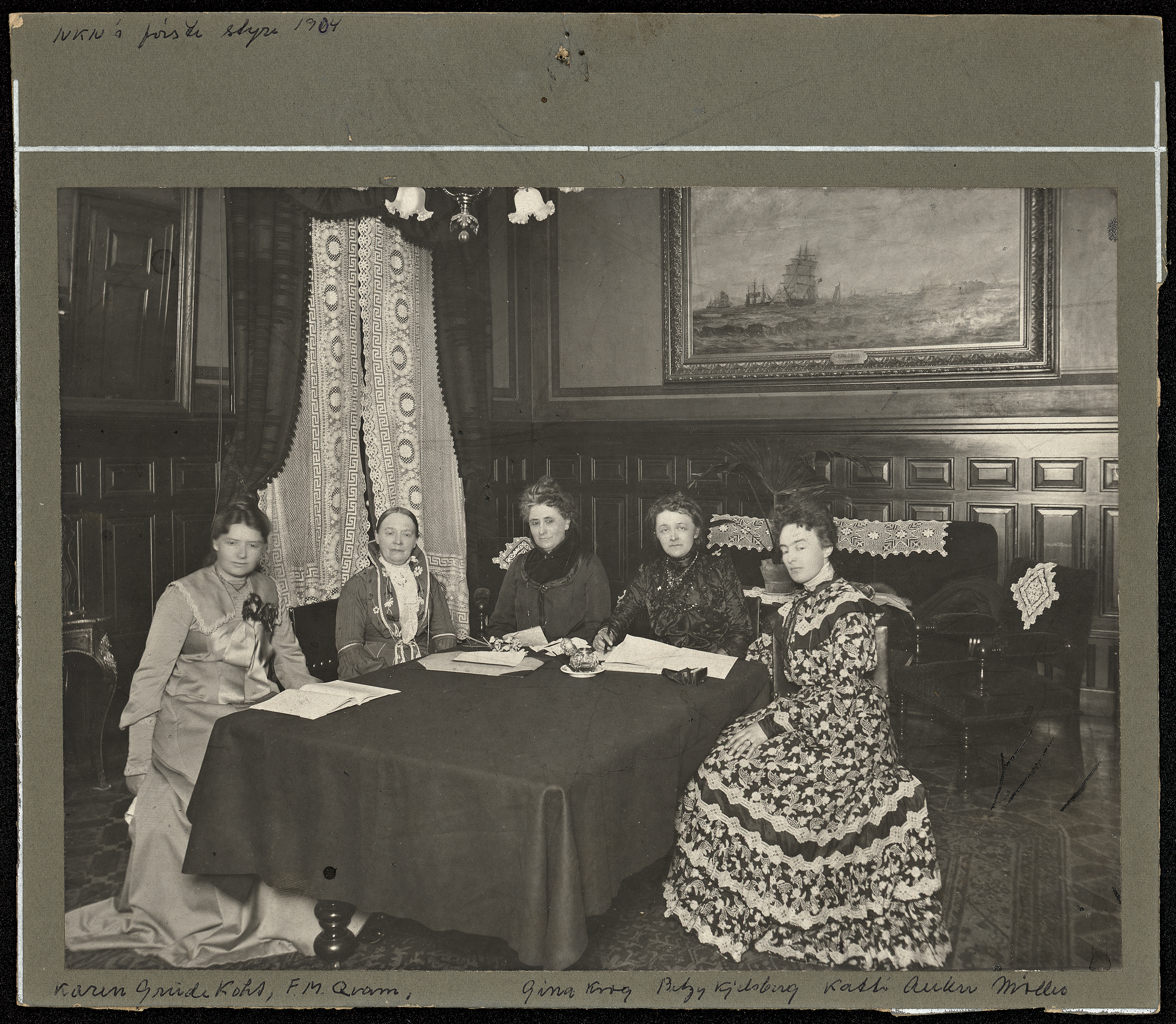
First meeting of the National Women's Council (1904). Left to right: Karen Grude Koht, Fredrikke Marie Qvam, Gina Krog, Betzy Kjelsberg, and Katti Anker Møller

Katti Anker Møller (23 October 1868 – 20 August 1945) was a Norwegian feminist, children's rights advocate, and a pioneer of reproductive rights.

== Biography ==
She was born Cathrine Anker in Hamar, the daughter of Herman Anker. She had nine siblings, and grew up around the first folk high school at Sagatun in Hamar, which was founded by her father. Educated as a teacher, she spent a year in France, where her exposure to the life of prostitutes and single mothers affected her profoundly. Her mother died at the age of 50, apparently exhausted from her many pregnancies, though the number of children she had was normal for her time.

She married her cousin Kai Møller from Thorsø Manor (Thorsø herregård) in Torsnes in 1889, with whom she had three children. Among them were the physician Tove Mohr, whose daughter Tove Pihl has carried on the pro-choice activism in Norway. Møller took an early interest in the dangers of too many childbirths, and the plight of unmarried women and their children. Her modus operandi was to travel and give lectures in local meetings, a revolutionary approach for a woman of her time.

In collaboration with her brother-in-law Johan Castberg, she worked tirelessly to legislate the rights of children born out of wedlock. This culminated in the institution of the so-called Castberg laws, passed by the Norwegian parliament in 1915. These laws were revolutionary in their time in giving illegitimate children full rights of inheritance and the right to use their father's surname.

She then turned her attention to decriminalizing abortion in Norway, an idea she presented through a lecture called "the liberation of motherhood", with the subtitle "the production of children under culture, the woman's right to decide over her own body". As a socialist, she declared that "The basis of all freedom is the right to dispose of one's own body, and what is in it. The opposite is the condition of a slave." This was met with broad opposition, also from some women. She was not dissuaded, and continued her efforts, adding birth control to her causes. In spite of opposition from opinion leaders such as Sigrid Undset, she managed to establish the first "hygiene office" in Oslo to inform women on contraception.

The Norwegian National Women's Council (Norske Kvinners Nasjonalråd) was founded in 1904 as an umbrella organization for various Norwegian women's associations. She served as a member of the organization, together with fellow rights activists Karen Grude Koht, Fredrikke Marie Qvam, Gina Krog, and Betzy Kjelsberg.

== Related reading ==
- Tove Mohr: Katti Anker Møller: en banebryter. 1976. Oslo. Tiden Norsk Forlag. ISBN 82-10-01258-4
