= Mære =

Village in Steinkjer Municipality, Norway

- Village
- Interactive map of Mære
- Location within Trøndelag Location within Norway
- Coordinates: 63.9380°N 11.4260°E
- Country: Norway
- Region: Central Norway
- County: Trøndelag
- District: Innherred
- Municipality: Steinkjer Municipality

Area
  - Total: 0.35 km^{2} (0.14 sq mi)
- Elevation: 43 m (141 ft)

Population (2024)
  - Total: 437
  - Density: 1,249/km^{2} (3,230/sq mi)
- Time zone: UTC+01:00 (CET)
  - Summer (DST): UTC+02:00 (CEST)
- Post Code: 7710 Sparbu

Mære is a village in Steinkjer Municipality in Trøndelag county, Norway. It is located along European route E6 and the Nordlandsbanen railway line, about 10 kilometres (6.2 mi) south of the town of Steinkjer. The village of Sparbu lies about 2.5 kilometres (1.6 mi) south of Mære. Mære Church is located in this village as well.

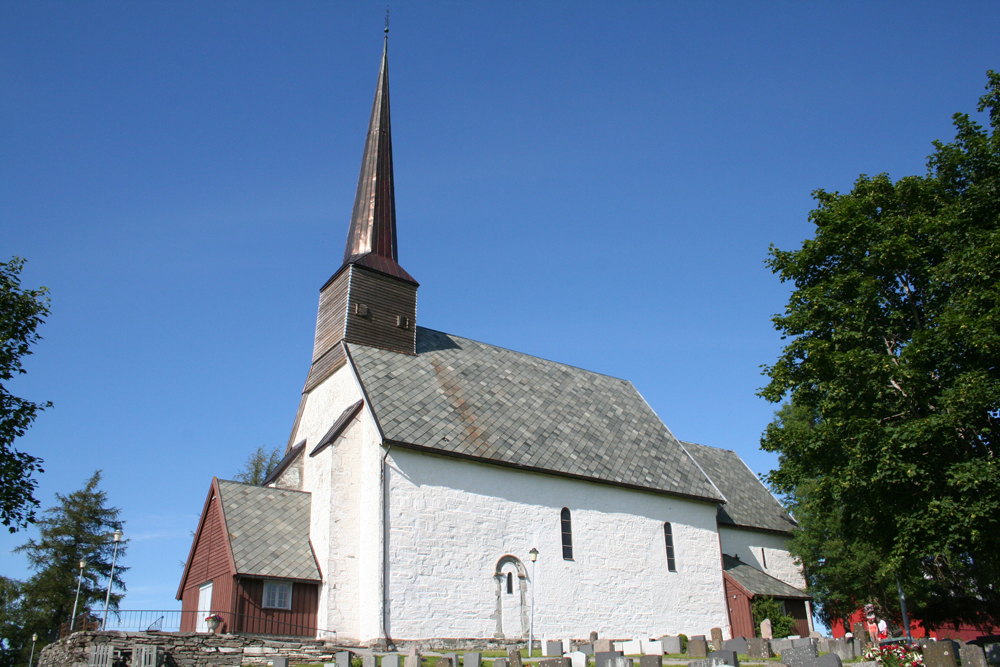
Mære Church

The 0.35-square-kilometre (86-acre) village has a population (2024) of 437 and a population density of 1,249 inhabitants per square kilometre (3,230/sq mi).

== History ==
In the early Viking Age, according to the Sagas, Mære was one of the most important religious ceremonial places, with sacrifices to the Norse gods. Under the medieval church at Mære, traces of preceding heathen hof were found in archeological investigations during the 1960s, the only case in Norway so far of a pre-Christian building being found to have existed on the site of a church.
