= Holmenkollen Chapel =

- Holmenkollen kapell
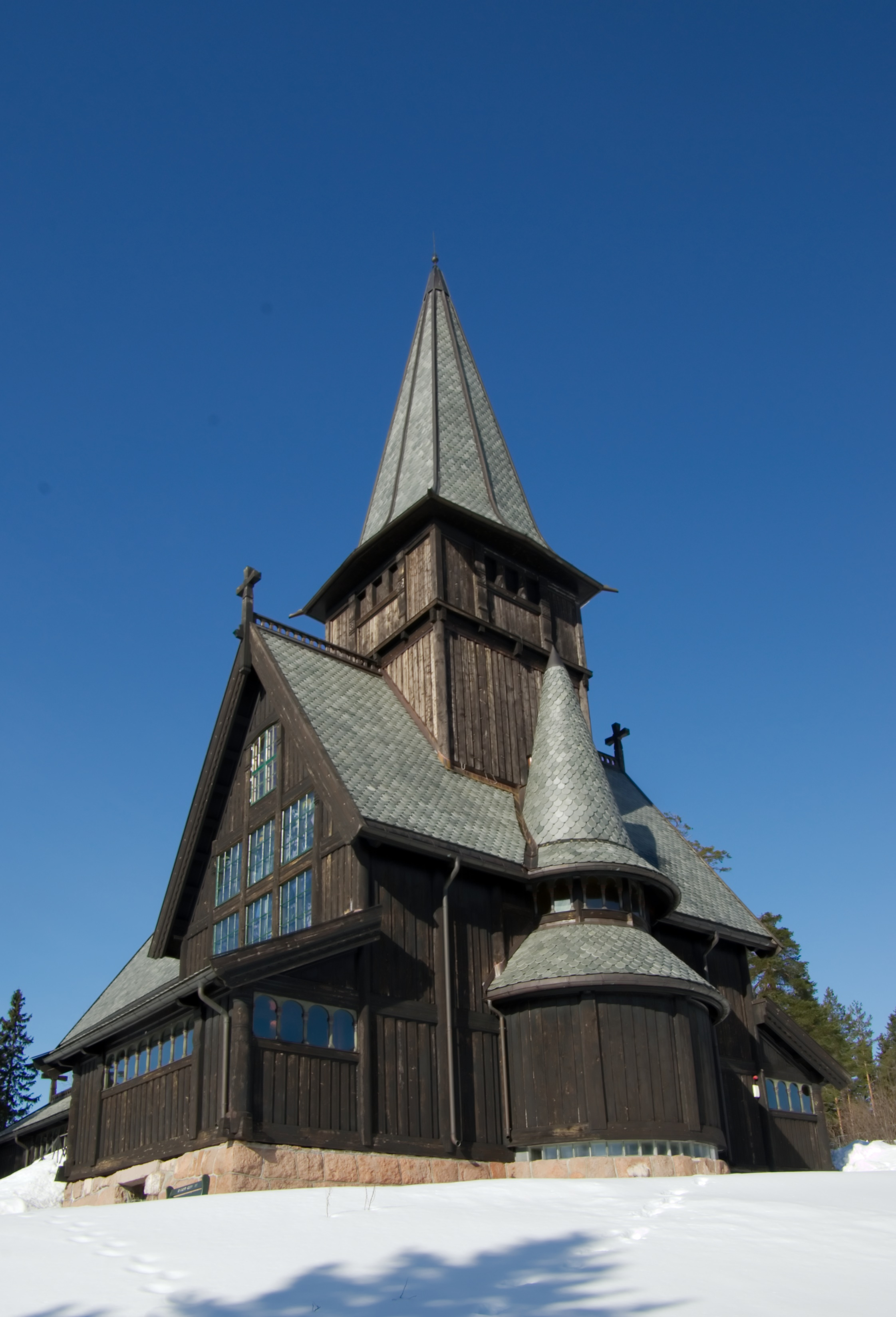
- Holmenkollen Chapel in 2009
- Holmenkollen Chapel
- 59°57′56.39″N 10°40′20.38″E
- Location: Holmenkollen, Oslo,
- Country: Norway
- Denomination: Church of Norway
- Churchmanship: Evangelical Lutheran
- Website: www.oslo.kirken.no/ris/holmenkollen

History
- Status: Chapel
- Consecrated: 1996

Architecture
- Functional status: Active
- Style: Dragestil

Specifications
- Capacity: 200
- Materials: Wood

Administration
- Diocese: Diocese of Oslo
- Parish: Ris

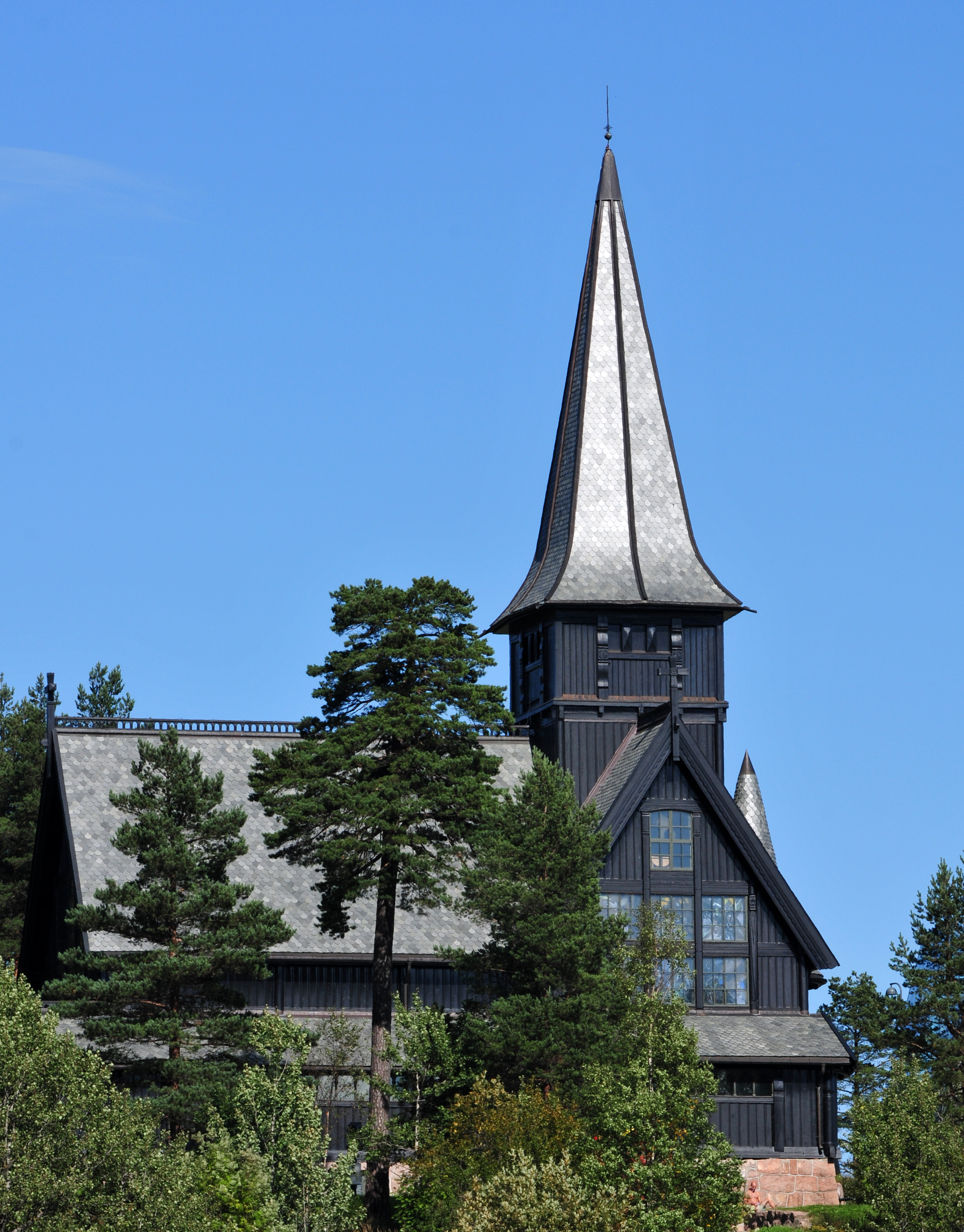
Holmenkollen Chapel

Holmenkollen Chapel (Holmenkollen kapell) is located in the neighborhood of Holmenkollen in the Vestre Aker borough of Oslo, Norway. The original chapel from 1903 was destroyed by arson in 1992. The new chapel was completed in 1996. Holmenkollen Chapel is a listed site, registered in Norway's cultural heritage database.

== Planning and construction of the former chapel ==
Holmenkollen Chapel was first built in 1903 after designs by architect Holger Sinding-Larsen as a paneled wooden pole construction. "Holmen og Voxenselskabet" was founded in 1880 for the acquisition and development of the area as a recreational area for locals. When the company disbanded in 1890, it gave one of its plots of c. 10,000 square meters (110,000 sq ft) to the municipality of Oslo to build a sports chapel.

Closely related to Holmenkollen Chapel was Fortidsminneforeningen. This association was established in 1844 with several painters as initiators. It was primarily the painter Johan Christian Dahl who spoke in favour of a stave church design. The association was the birthplace of a young generation of Norwegian architects around the turn of the 20th century, reviving the tradition of Norwegian historic wooden architecture. They searched back to the early Middle Ages, when Norway had its Golden Age. They emphasized identity and their own history, nature and architecture. Holmenkollen Chapel was a direct result of the young generation of architects' emerging awareness of this heritage.

== From chapel to church ==
From its opening in 1903, the building was used as a chapel. Only in 1913 was it dedicated to the use of church services and church ceremonies such as baptism, confirmation, marriage and funerals in addition to sports services. The chapel was intended as a facility for hikers who wanted to attend a Sunday service, even if they chose to go up into the heights for exercise and fresh air. Hiking in the woods was almost fashionable in the late 19th century.

Tourist hotels, restaurants, spas and sanatoriums were built in the area, making it a destination also for the growing population of the capital Christiania, (now Oslo). Nature trails and roads led up the Holmenkollåsen (the hill at Holmenkollen).

== Royal Lodge ==
In 1910, the Royal Lodge (Kongsseteren), located close to the chapel, was presented to King Haakon and Queen Maud as a coronation gift from the Norwegian people. The Royal Lodge is a regular haunt of the Norwegian royal family. Whenever they are there – especially during the Christmas holidays and the traditional Holmenkollen competitions in March – they visit the Holmenkollen Chapel.

== Fire and reconstruction ==
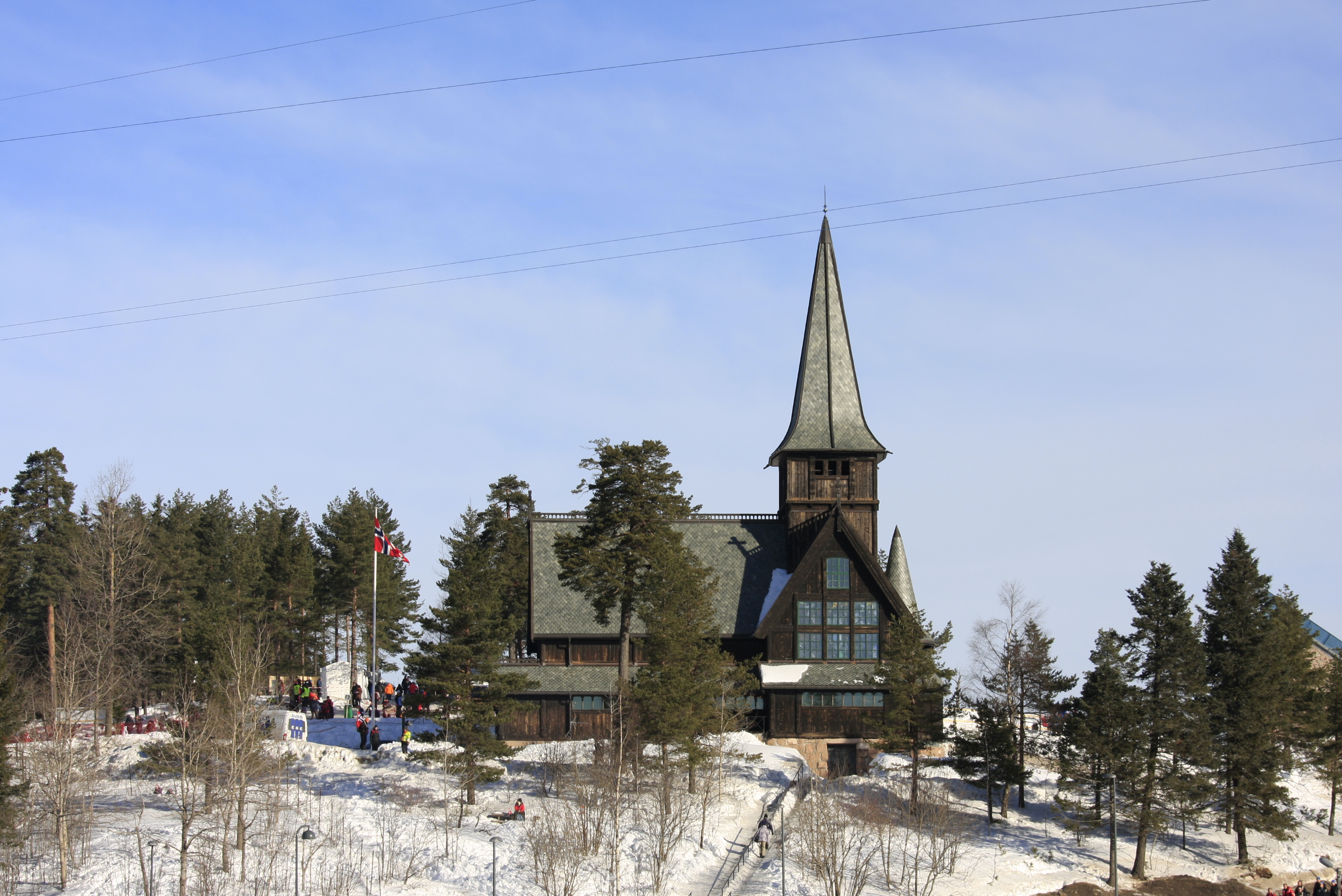
Holmenkollen Chapel in winter

The chapel was burned down in an act of arson on 23 August 1992. The police first concluded that the fire was not intentional, but that it was due to a defect in the electrical system. Later, this explanation was withdrawn and the black metal artists Varg Vikernes (of Burzum) and Bård "Faust" Eithun were tried and sentenced; Øystein "Euronymous" Aarseth had also participated, but was murdered by Vikernes before the trial.

An early proposal from the church to build a modern chapel was soon abandoned as a result of a popular demand to build a church that looked like the original building. With half of the funds from the private collection, a new chapel was designed by architect Arne Sødal and built in 1996.

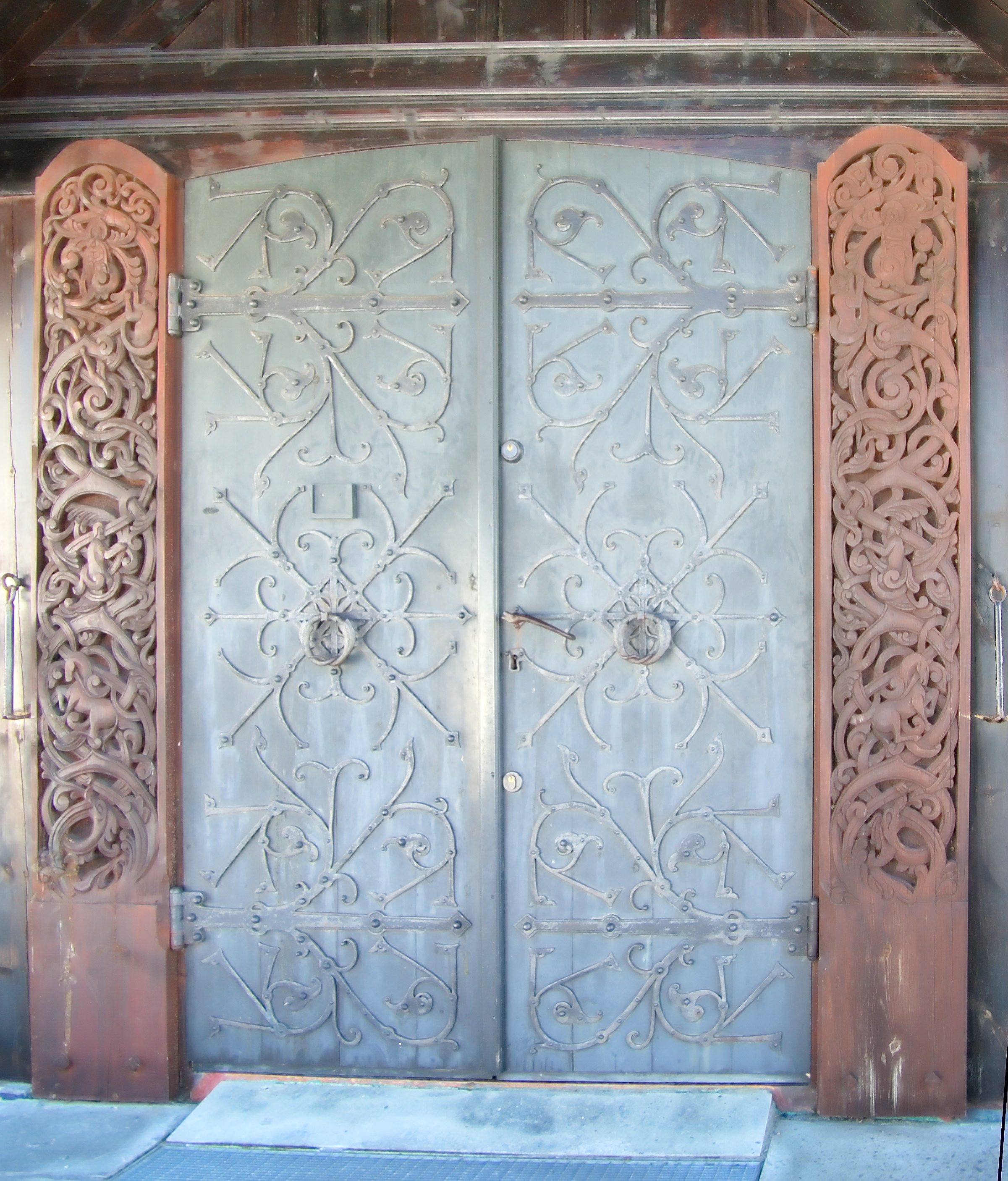
Holmenkollen Chapel entrance

== The new chapel ==
The new chapel was built with inspiration from the stave churches of Rauland and Heidal, built with massive planks and pine walls. Its arches are made of solid spruce roots and only old handicraft techniques were used. To facilitate construction, an accurate 3-dimensional model was made first. Drawings based on the model were used for making all of the components in Vågå Municipality before they were brought to Holmenkollen by road and assembled as a kit.

The chapel has new stave church features, and benefits from dragestil wood carvings. The chapel serves as a new working church. In addition to the church, the complex contains an assembly hall, kitchen and meeting rooms.
