= Arneberg =

Arneberg is a Norwegian surname. Notable people with the surname include:

- Arnstein Arneberg (1882–1961), Norwegian architect
- Christen Larsen Arneberg (1808–1874), Norwegian politician
- Helmi Arneberg-Pentti (1889–1981), chairman of Lotta Svärd, Finnish auxiliary organisation for women in 1920s.
- Per Arneberg (1901–1981), Norwegian poet, prosaist and translator
- Tor Arneberg (1928–2015), Norwegian sailor
- Ulrik Arneberg (disambiguation), multiple people
- Urda Arneberg (1929–2000), Norwegian actress
- David Arneberg (1996-Present), American Fighter Pilot
