= Ris Church =

Church in Oslo, Norway

- Ris kirke
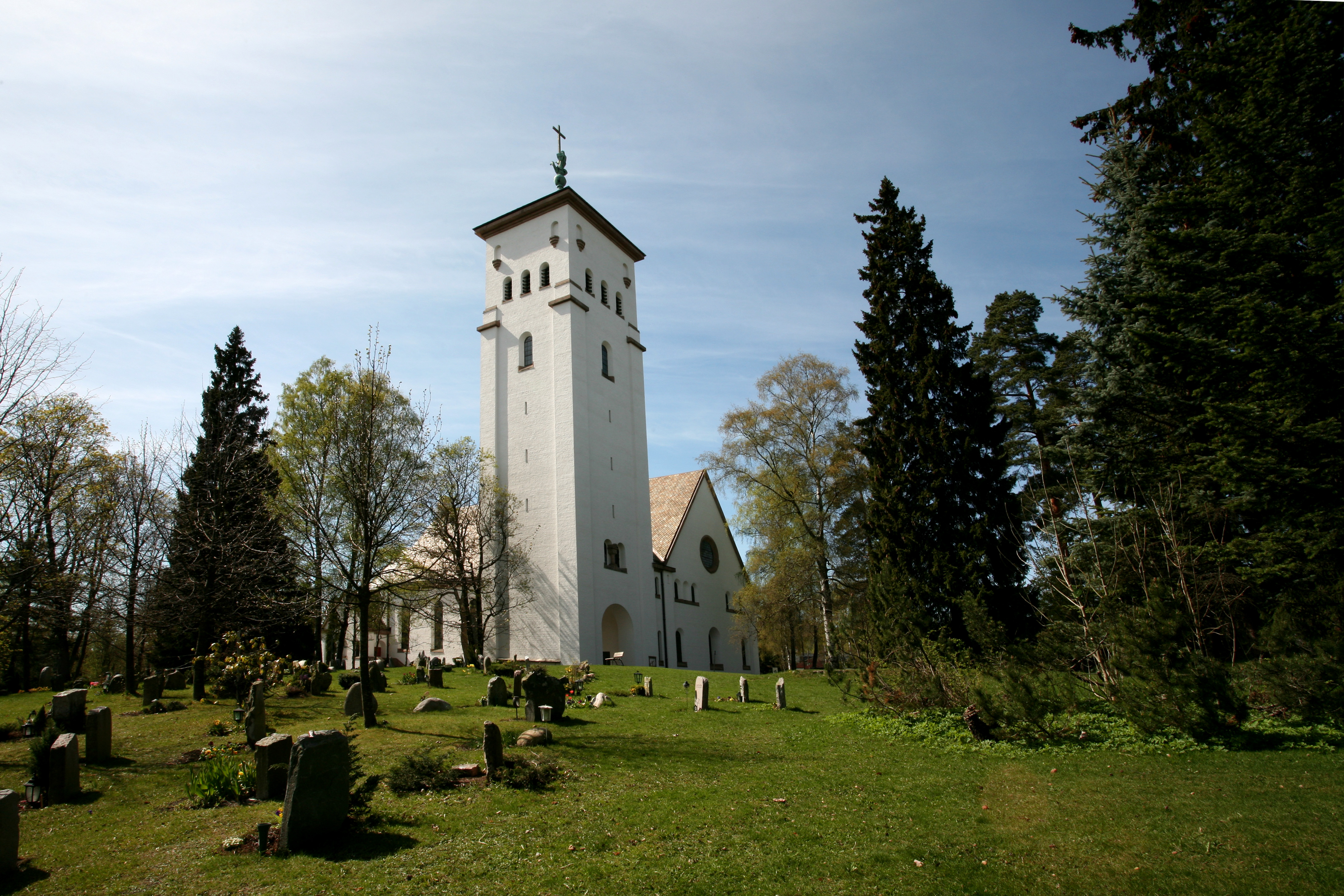

- Location within Oslo Location within Norway
- 59°56′51″N 10°42′5″E
- Location: Risbakken 1 Ris, Oslo,
- Country: Norway
- Denomination: Church of Norway
- Churchmanship: Evangelical Lutheran
- Website: oslo.kirken.no/ris

History
- Status: Parish church
- Consecrated: 1932

Architecture
- Functional status: Active
- Architect: Carl Berner

Specifications
- Materials: Concrete

Administration
- Diocese: Diocese of Oslo
- Parish: Ris

Ris Church (Ris kirke) is a church in Oslo, Norway. The Romanesque Revival style church is situated in a neighborhood of Ris in the borough of Vestre Aker in Oslo.

The church was built in the spring of 1932 and was consecrated on 12 June 1932. The costs amounted to 723,000 Norwegian krones, including donations, for a sum of 284,000. The church originally had about 750 seats, but after a few benches in the back and the church gallery were removed it now has approximately 500 seats.

Because of the shape of the plot, the Ris Church is oriented north–south, unlike most churches that are oriented west–east. The stained glass art is by artist and glass maker, Per Vigeland (1904–1968). Over the chancel of the church, hangs a figure of Christ by sculptor Sigri Welhaven. In 1932, Hugo Lous Mohr painted the altarpiece, titled Christ and the little children.

Ris Church has 3 church bells dating from 1930, all of which bear the inscription Riis kirke – Anno 1930. The bells were designed by the architect Carl Berner and were forged by the Olsen Nauen Bell Foundry (Olsen Nauen Klokkestøperi) in Sem. The largest bell weighs 1746 kg and is tuned in D♯. It was at one time the largest bell that was cast in Norway. The medium-sized bell weighs 892 kg and is tuned in F♯. The smallest bell weighs 550 kg and is tuned in A♭.

== Cemetery ==
A cemetery is contained within the church yard, ("Ris Kirkegård"). Here multiple notable Norwegians are buried including:

- Princess Astrid, Mrs. Ferner (1932–2026) and Johan Martin Ferner (1927–2015)
- Karl August Haraldsen (1889–1959) and Dagny Ulrichsen Haraldsen (1898–1994), parents of Queen Sonja of Norway.
- Per Asplin (1928–1996), musician, actor and artist
- Bias Bernhoft (1902–1986), singer, review author
- Sverre Grette (1888–1959), jurist, Norwegian supreme court justice

== See also ==
- Holmenkollen Chapel
