= Ullerøy =

Peninsula in Sarpsborg, Norway

Coordinates: 59.2047°N 11.12°E

Ullerøy is a peninsula and urban area in the municipality of Sarpsborg in Østfold, Norway. As of 2009, the population was 363. Before 1992 Ullerøy was a part of Skjeberg municipality.

== Ullerøy Church ==
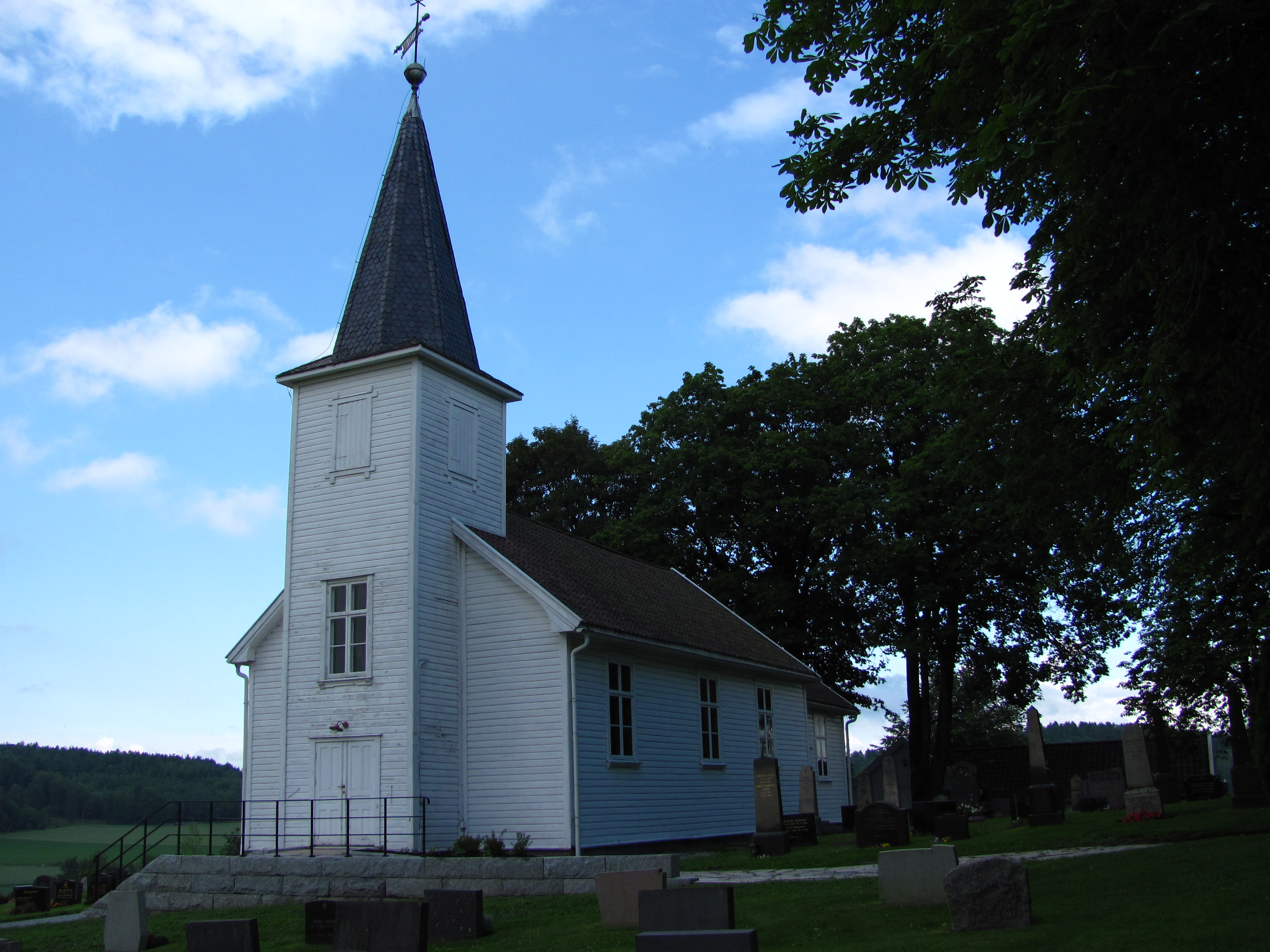
Ullerøy Church

Ullerøy Church (Ullerøy kirke) was finished in 1725. It was constructed of wood and seats 160 people. There is also a cemetery by the church.

== Etymology ==
The Norse form of the name was Ullarøy. The first element is the genitive case of the name of the Norse god Ullr. The last element is øy, meaning "island". The former island was later turned into a peninsula because of post-glacial rebound. A neighbouring headland has the name Torsnes.
