= Kai Møller =

Norwegian politician (1859–1940)

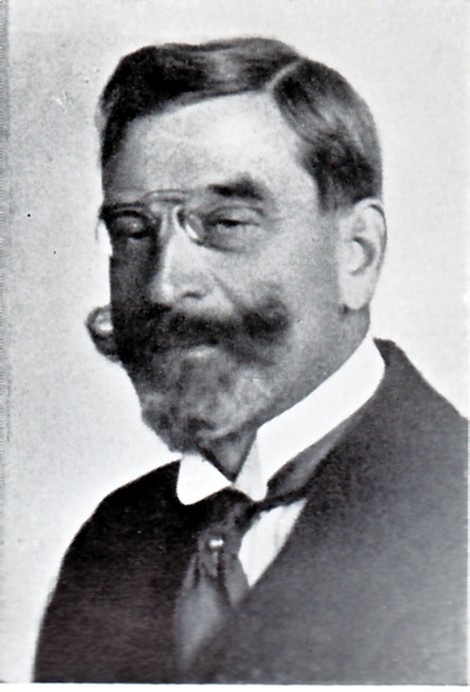
- Born: 22 May 1859; Halden, Norway
- Died: 22 September 1940 (aged 81)
- Occupations: land owner and politician
- Spouse: Katti Anker Møller
- Children: Tove Mohr

Kai Bisgaard Anker Møller (22 May 1859 – 22 September 1940) was a Norwegian land owner and politician.

== Biography ==
Møller was born at Dyrendal near Halden in Østfold, Norway. He was the son of Edvard Johannes Møller (1819–85) and Diderikke Annette Anker (1838-1912). The family moved to Thorsø Manor (Thorsø herregård) at Torsnes when his father took over the estate. He attended Christiania Cathedral School and graduated in 1877. He graduated from the College of Agriculture (Høiere landbruksskole) (now Norwegian University of Life Sciences) at Ås in Akershus during 1880. This was followed by studies in Denmark and the United Kingdom. In 1885 he took over the Thorsø estate.

He served as mayor of Torsnes for several years and held a number of other municipal positions. He was elected to the Parliament of Norway from 1900 to 1903, representing Smaalenenes amt (now Østfold). He was a member of the Liberal Party.

In 1889, he married his cousin Katti Anker Møller. daughter of Herman Anker (1839–1896). They were the parents of physician Tove Mohr.

== Related reading ==
- Odd Grande (1961) Kai Møller, herren til Thorsø (Oslo: Gyldendal) OCLC 14113296
- Tove Mohr (1976) Katti Anker Møller: en banebryter (Oslo. Tiden Norsk Forlag) ISBN 82-10-01258-4

Cultural offices
Preceded by Christian Michelsen	Chancellor of the Order Council; 1925–1932	Succeeded by Jørgen Blydt
