= Ulrik Arneberg =

Ulrik Arneberg may refer to:

- Ulrik Frederik Christian Arneberg (1829–1911), Norwegian politician
- Ulrik Arneberg (footballer) (born 1987), Norwegian football player
