= Thorsø, Norway =

Thorsø
- Village
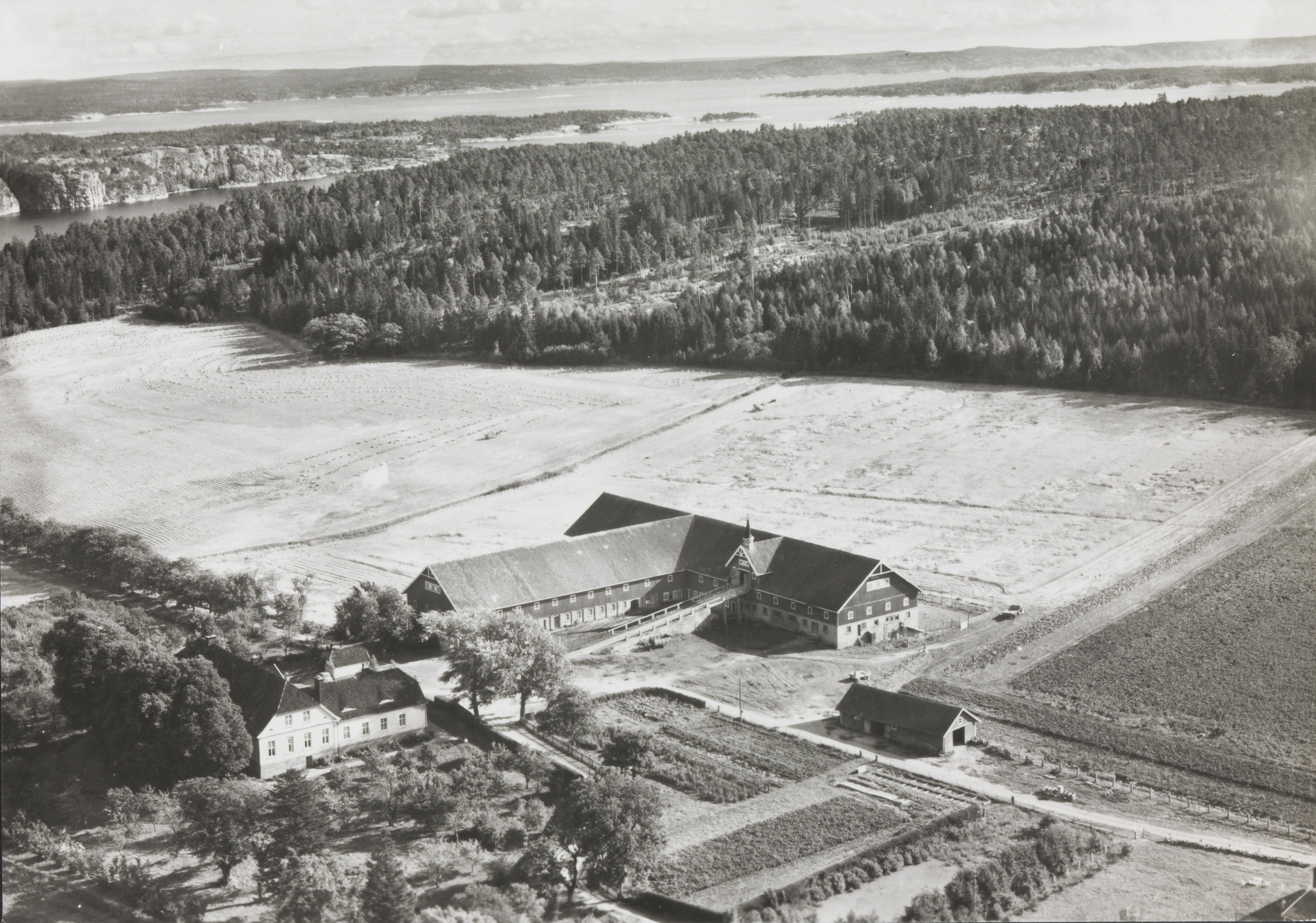
- Thorsø, between 1975 and 1979

- Location in Norway
- Coordinates: 59.161854°N 11.094028°E
- Country: Norway
- County: Østfold
- Municipality: Fredrikstad
- Time zone: UTC+1 (CET)
  - Summer (DST): UTC+2 (CEST)
- Postal code: 1634

Thorsø or Tose is a farm located in the former municipality of Torsnes (until 1910 part of Borge) in Østfold county, Norway. The first written source found about this farm is from 1472, in the form of Tosowe. This is one of three placenames in Østfold that are believed to derive from Old Norse Þórshof and thus indicate an old location for worshipping the Norse god Thor, a temple or "hof". Jan de Vries pointed out in his work on Germanic religion that although instances of placenames derived from Þórshof are fairly common in Norway, they are all grouped around the Oslofjord.

As of 1998, the property consisted of 1,360 hectares (3,400 acres) of land, 108.6 hectares (268 acres) under cultivation and 650 hectares (1,600 acres) woodland. The main house dates to 1900, replacing one destroyed by fire in 1899.

Archaeological discoveries on the farm indicate that settlement there dates back to ancient times and include stone axes and two 12th-century runestones. The first known owner of the property was Alv Haraldsson (Bolt) (d. 1412). Under Oluf Kalips it became an aristocratic estate, and it has since belonged to the Rosenvinge, Bildt, Budde, Sehested and Stang families.

Prominent owners of the Thorsø estate have included war minister Hans Angell Gude, who disappeared from the house mysteriously in the autumn of 1814, thought to have been murdered, and the Norwegian politician and agronomist Kai Møller. Bjørnstjerne Bjørnson wrote his Sigurd Jorsalfar while staying there in 1872.

The estate is the "Lindeby" of a trilogy of historical novels by Ingeborg Møller, whose father's family owned the property: Vårfrost (1931), Lindeby (1933), and Runestenene (1934).
