= Mære Church =

Church in Trøndelag, Norway

- Mære kirke
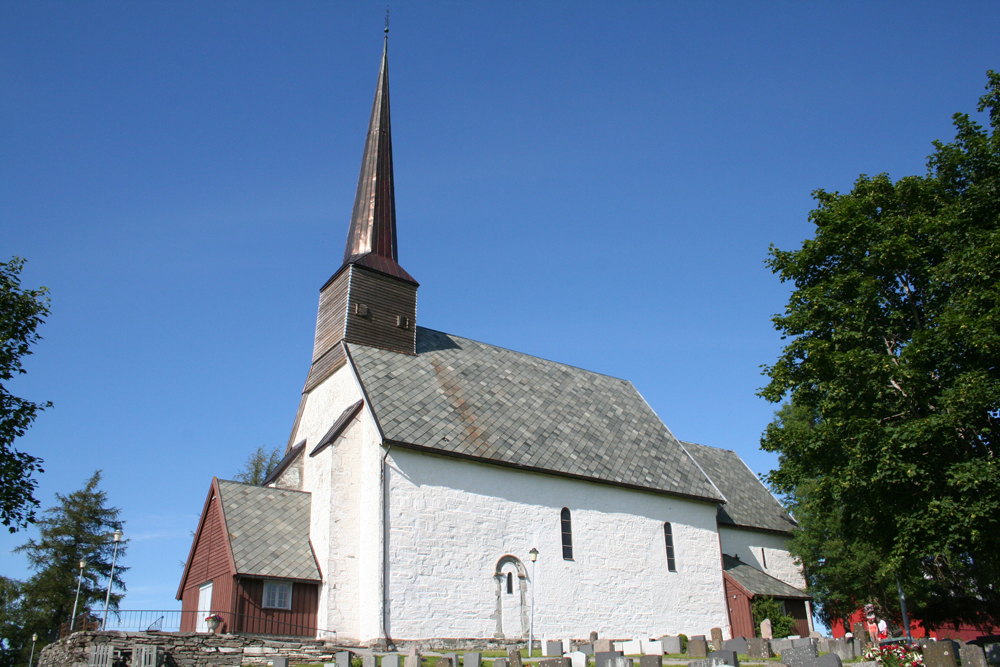
- View of the church
- Mære Church
- 63.93395184°N 11.394937187°E
- Location: Steinkjer Municipality, Trøndelag
- Country: Norway
- Denomination: Church of Norway
- Previous denomination: Catholic Church
- Churchmanship: Evangelical Lutheran

History
- Status: Parish church
- Founded: 11th century
- Consecrated: c. 1150

Architecture
- Functional status: Active
- Architectural type: Long church
- Style: Romanesque
- Completed: c. 1150 (876 years ago)

Specifications
- Capacity: 310
- Materials: Stone

Administration
- Diocese: Nidaros bispedømme
- Deanery: Stiklestad prosti
- Parish: Mære
- Norwegian Cultural Heritage Site
- Type: Church
- Status: Automatically protected
- ID: 85083

Mære Church (Norwegian: Mære kirke) is a parish church of the Church of Norway in Steinkjer Municipality in Trøndelag county, Norway. It is located in the village of Mære. It is the church for the Mære parish which is part of the Stiklestad prosti (deanery) in the Diocese of Nidaros of the Church of Norway. The white, plastered stone church was built in a long church style during the 12th century using plans drawn up by an unknown architect. The church seats about 310 people.

== History ==
=== Pre-Christianity ===
Mærehaugen is the name of the place where the church is located. Before the mid-1100s when the church was built, Mærehaugen was a pagan centre of worship. During the 10th century, Mære was a central estate for the Trøndelag region. This may possibly be the site referred to in the medieval Icelandic Landnámabók in chapter 297. The floor of the church was excavated in 1969 and found to contain the remains of a pagan cult structure. Hans Emil Lidén felt this represented the remains of a building, but a critique by Olsen in the same work suggested this may have been a site for pole worship. A recent review of the evidence by Walaker Norddide concluded that this site was similar to the site in Hove (Åsen, also in Trøndelag) and was therefore likely the site of a ceremonial pole.

=== As a Christian place of worship ===
During the 11th century, Christianity came to Norway. A new Christian church was built at Mære on this old pagan worship site. The first church here was a small, wooden stave church. The nave was rectangular and there was a narrower choir with a lower roof line. The nave measured approximately 10.5 by 6.5 metres (34 ft × 21 ft) and the choir measured about 3.5 by 3.5 metres (11 ft × 11 ft). This church was in use from the 11th century until the late-12th century when it was too small for the parish. Around 1150, it was decided to build a new stone church on the same site. Over the next half-century, the church was constructed on that site. First, a choir was built surrounding the old wooden church, and when that was completed, the old wooden church was torn down. The rest of the stone church was then constructed.

=== Medieval history ===
The earliest existing historical records of the new stone church date back to the year 1277, but the church was not new that year. A crucifix in the church has been dated to around the year 1150, so that is possibly from the year the church was built which was also around the same time as the establishment of the Roman Catholic Archdiocese of Nidaros. A construction period during the mid- to late-1100s is suggested by stylistic dating of its dedicatory inscription as well as the finding of coins dating from the reign of King Sverre (1183–1202) have been found during excavations over the years. The Romanesque stone church was probably built over a period of many years starting around the year 1150. The choir was likely constructed first around the year 1150. Some time after that was completed (near the end of the 12th century), work began on a nave and tower. The rectangular nave was taller and wider than the existing choir. It had a small wooden entry porch with a small tower on the west end of the building. Dendrochronological dating of the roof structure in the nave show that timber for this was cut in the year 1198 or 1199. The church is noted for its medieval roof featuring carvings of heads (human, beast, and mythological) projecting from the top of its walls. The church is built of quarried stone that was probably mined nearby. It has always been whitewashed both outside and inside. The portal and window frames are made of hewn soapstone.

In 1277, parts of the western tower collapsed. Major repair work was undertaken afterwards to remove the rest of the tower as well as raising the floor level and the altar in the choir. The church was re-consecrated after the work was completed.

=== Modern history ===
In 1814, this church served as an election church (Norwegian: valgkirke). Together with more than 300 other parish churches across Norway, it was a polling station for elections to the 1814 Norwegian Constituent Assembly which wrote the Constitution of Norway. This was Norway's first national elections. Each church parish was a constituency that elected people called "electors" who later met together in each county to elect the representatives for the assembly that was to meet at Eidsvoll Manor later that year.

Several renovations and restorations have been undertaken over the years. In 1878 Rasmus Overrein was hired to do some repairs and renovations. During the 1920s, under the direction of architect Claus Hjelte (1884-1969) minor repair work was undertaken. In 1956, architect John Egil Tverdahl was given the task of planning a comprehensive restoration of Mære Church. Work did not start until ten years later because they took the opportunity to conduct extensive archaeological research. From 1966 to 1969, the windows from the 17th century were recreated. Both a sacristy for the priest and a new entry porch and baptismal sacristy were built in the west. The walls were sealed and whitewashed, and the tower and roof were repaired. Inside, the flat ceiling in the nave was removed so the original vaulted ceiling became visible once again. New wooden flooring was laid in the nave. In the choir, a royal monogram from 1811 was discovered and re-painted. A closed pulpit and a large wood burning stove were removed. The pulpit was moved to the south side of the choir opening. A new balcony seating gallery was built and a new organ was installed.

== Media gallery ==
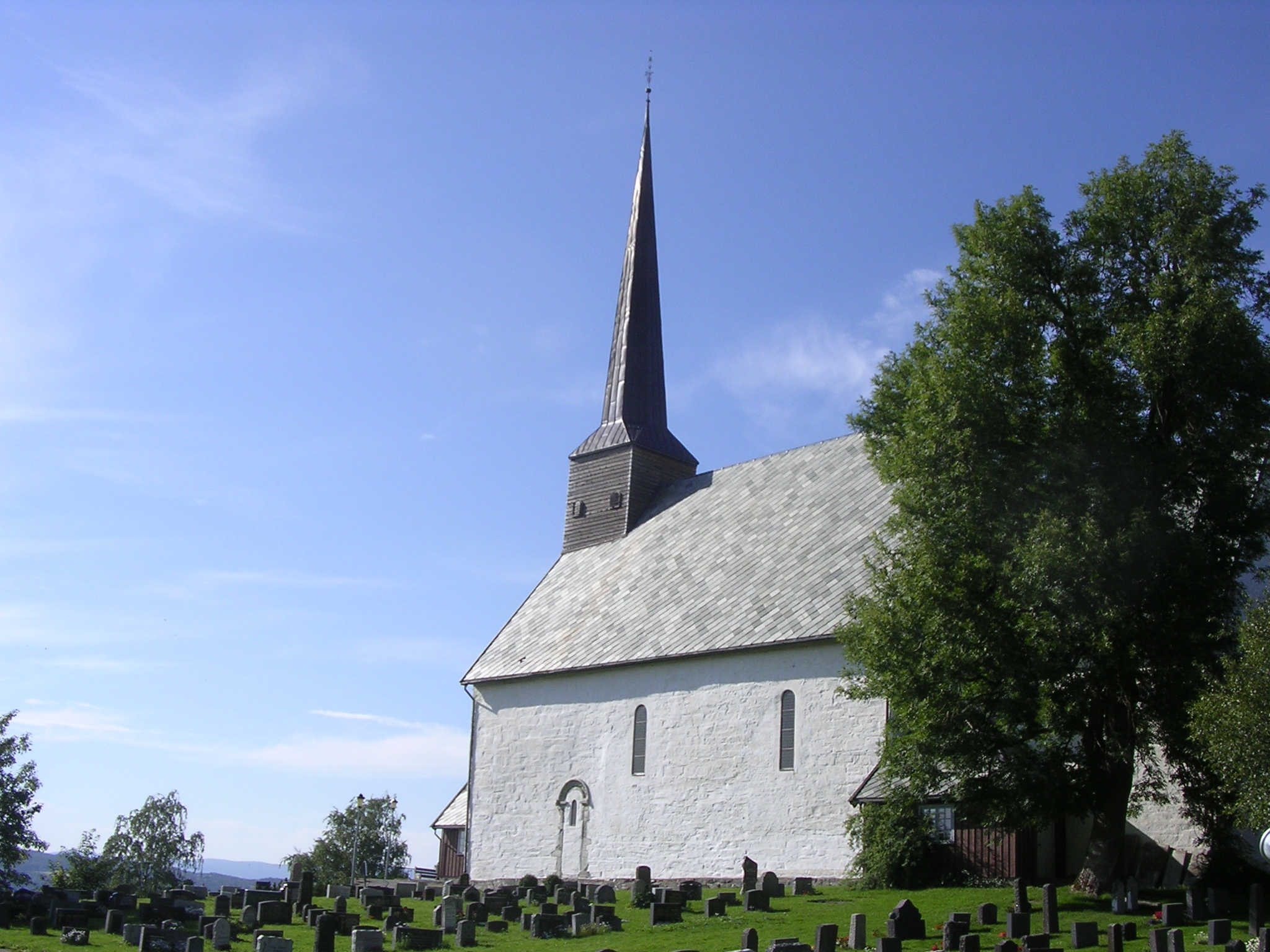

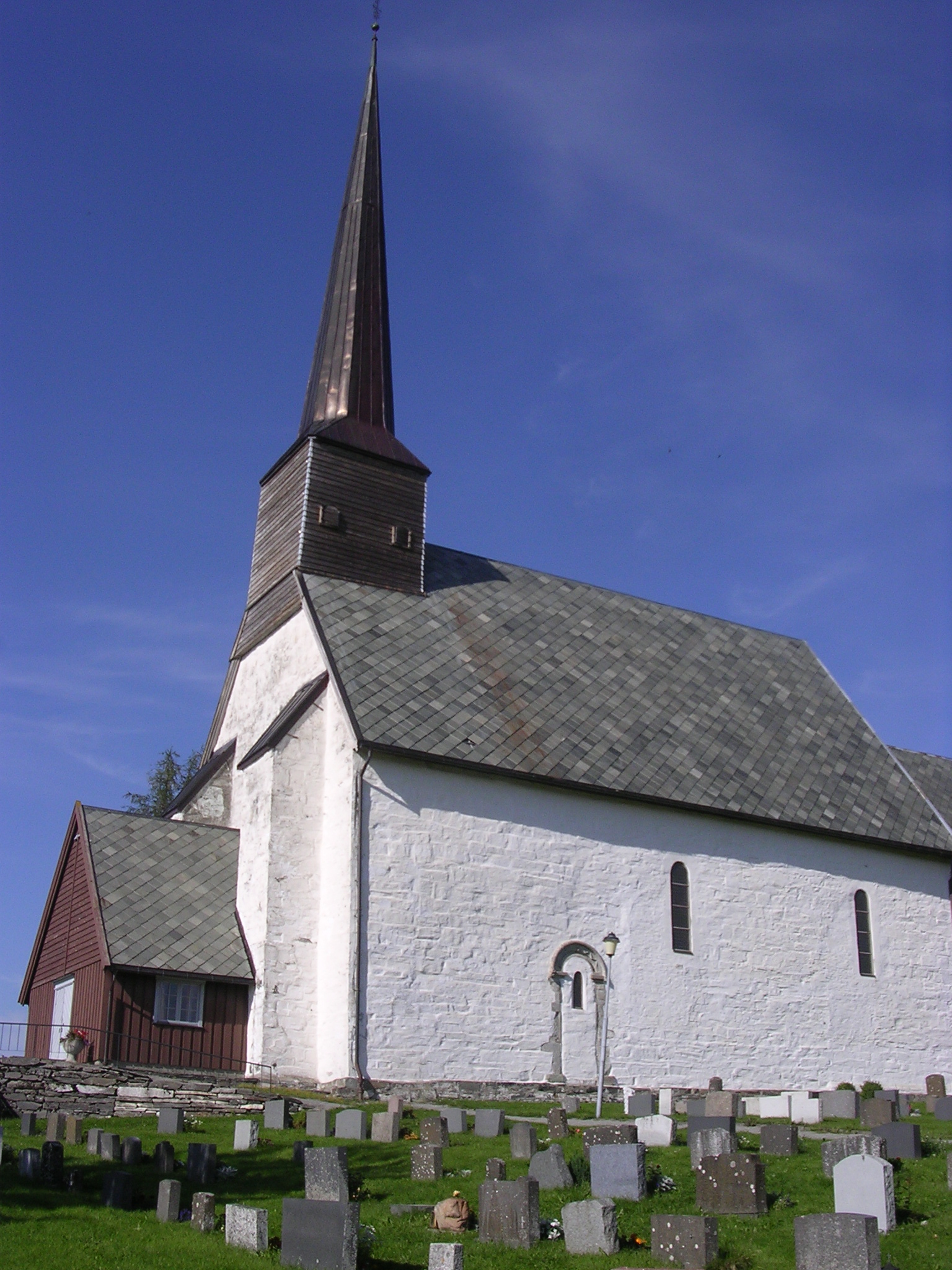

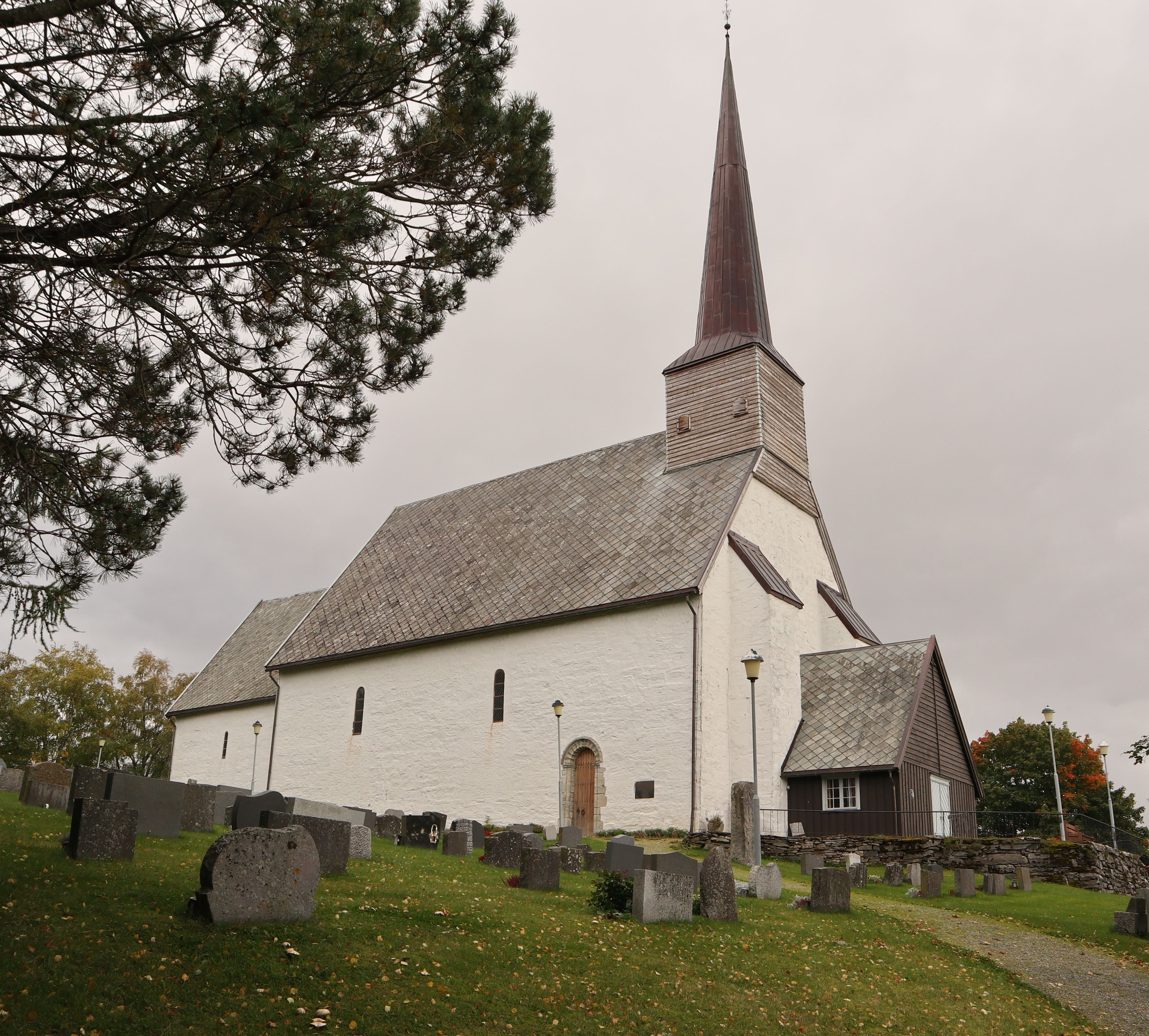

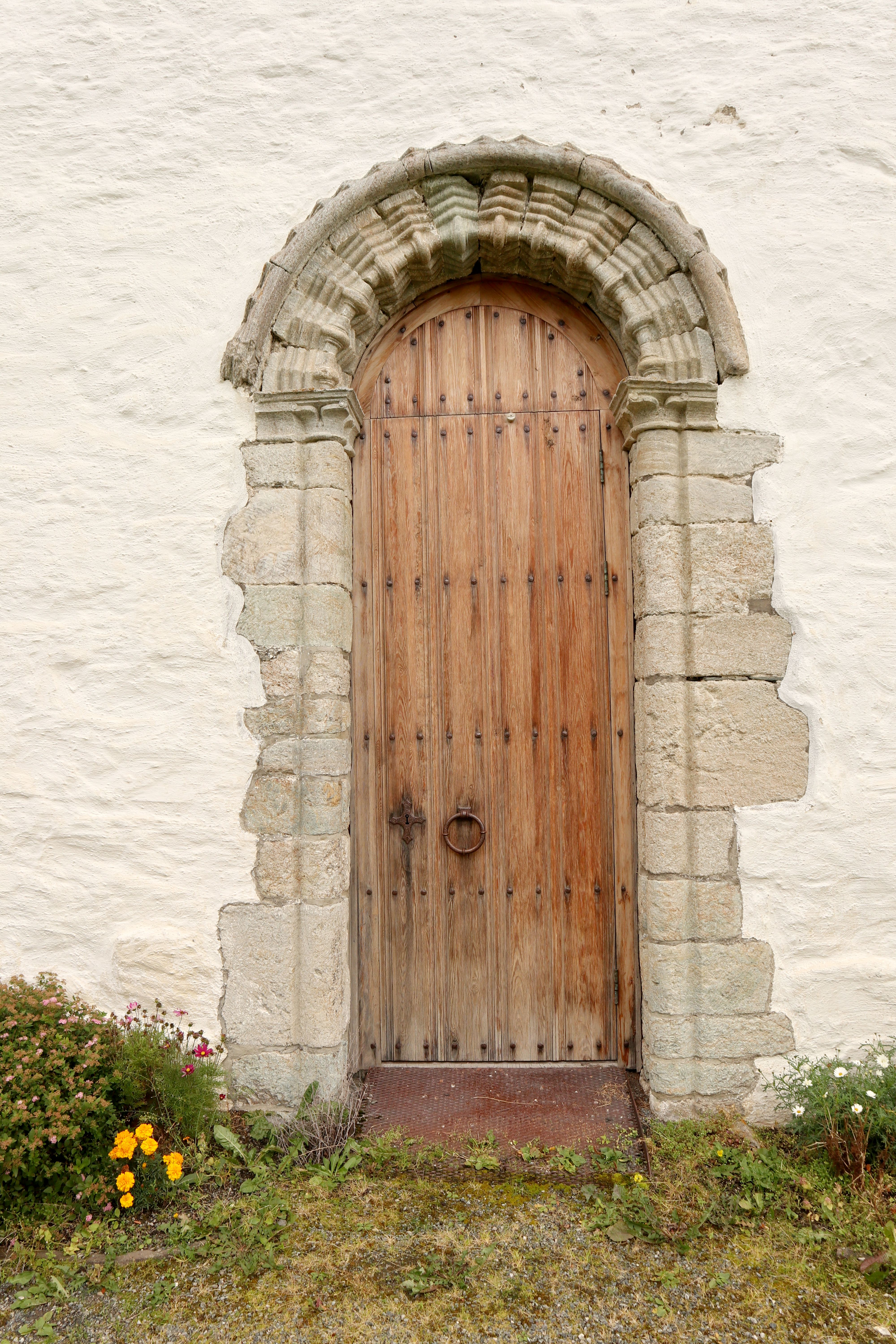

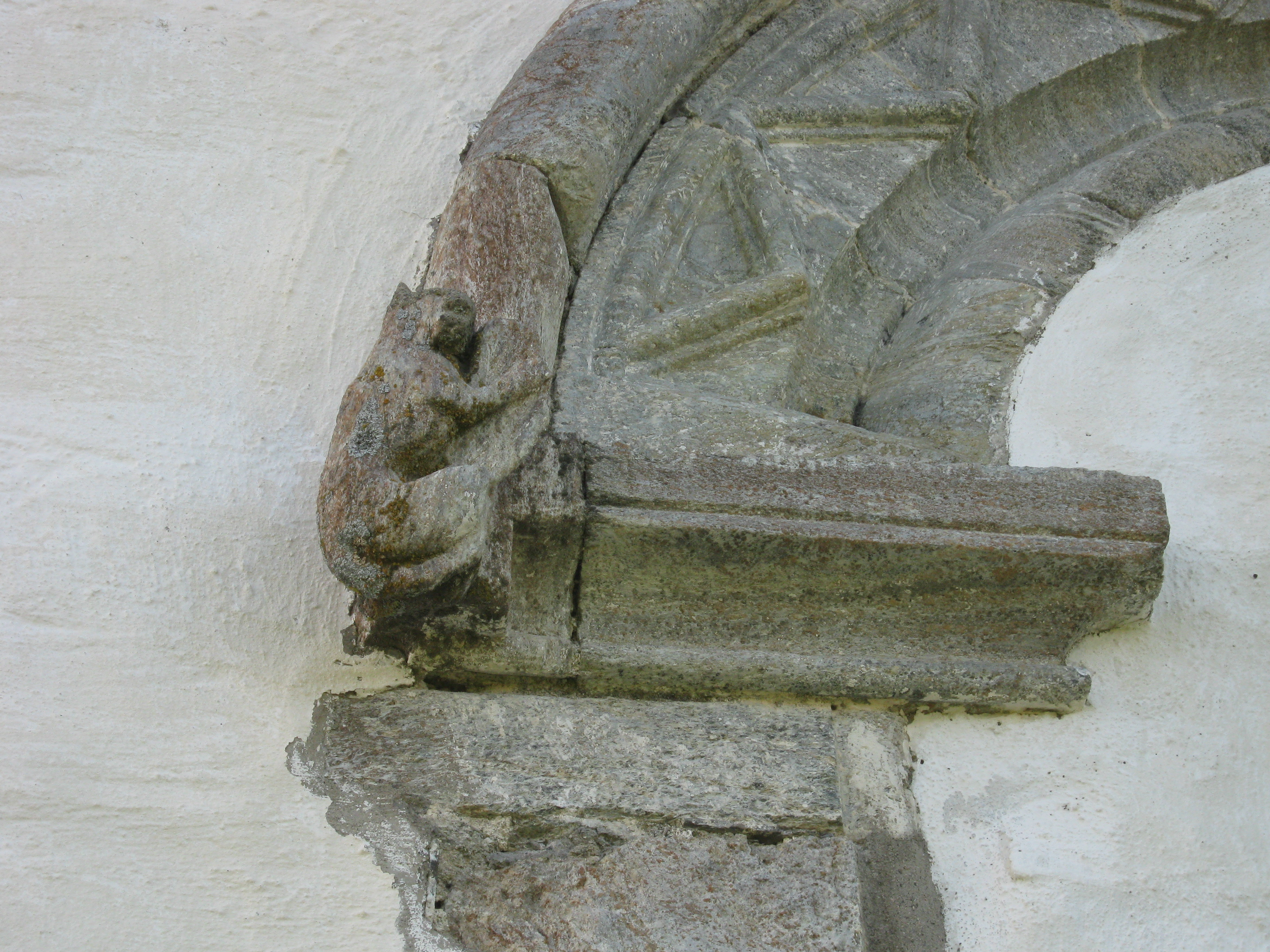

== See also ==
- List of churches in Nidaros
