= Otto Lous Mohr =

Norwegian medical doctor

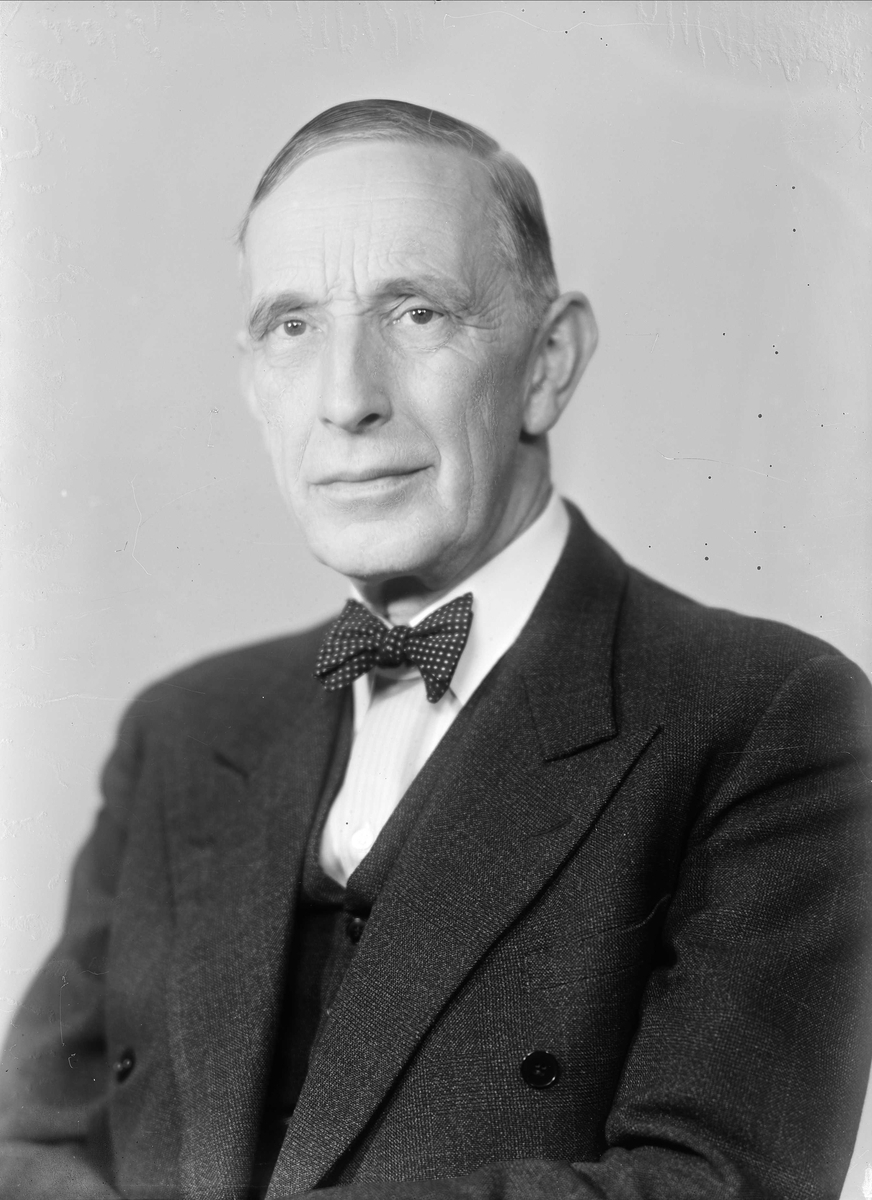
- Otto Lous Mohr in 1946
- Born: 8 March 1886; Mandal
- Died: 23 June 1967 (aged 81)
- Occupation: Anatomist
- Employer: University of Oslo

Otto Lous Mohr (8 March 1886 – 23 June 1967) was a Norwegian medical doctor and geneticist.

Mohr was born in Mandal. He was a professor of anatomy at the University of Oslo from 1919 to 1952, and served as rector from 1946 to 1952.

During the German occupation of Norway he was arrested by the Nazi authorities on 11 September 1941, together with Didrik Arup Seip and Anton Wilhelm Brøgger. He was incarcerated at Møllergata 19 until 30 September, then at Grini concentration camp from 28 March 1942.

Cultural offices
Preceded by Henning Bødtker	Chairman of the Norwegian Students' Society; 1917 (spring)	Succeeded by Erling Winsnes
Academic offices
Preceded by Didrik Arup Seip	Rectors of the University of Oslo; 1946–1952	Succeeded by Frede Castberg
