= Torsnes =

Former municipality in Østfold, Norway

Coordinates: 59°31′N 5°49′E

Torsnes is a former municipality in Østfold county, Norway. It is the site of Torsnes Church (Torsnes kirke).

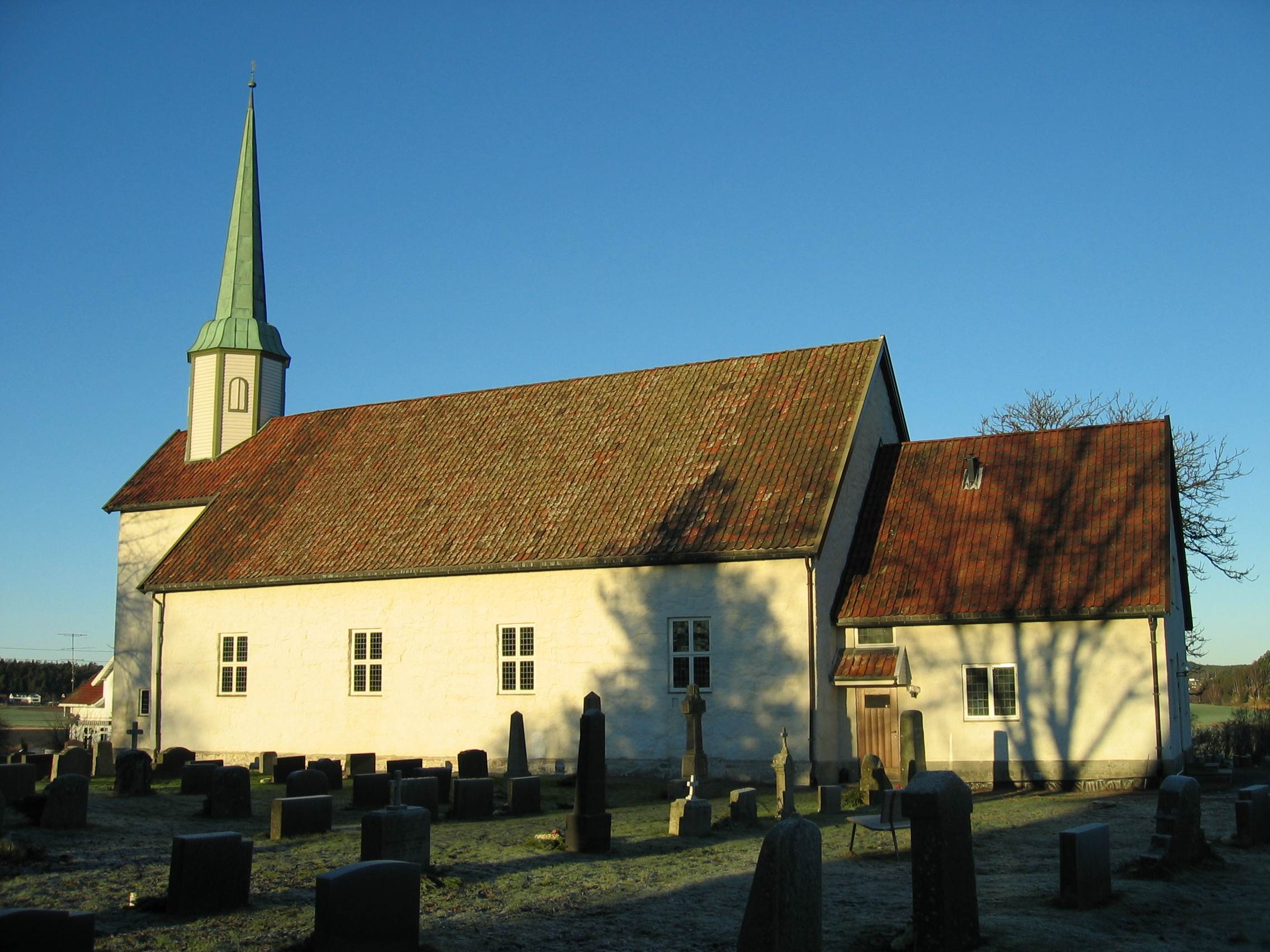
Torsnes Church

== History ==
Torsnes was created by a split from Borge on 1 January 1910. At that time Torsnes had a population of 1,538. On 1 January 1964, Gansrød and Ulfeng, with 30 inhabitants, were incorporated into Fredrikstad while the rest of Torsnes, with 1,274 inhabitants, was reunited with Borge. On 1 January 1994, Borge was incorporated into Fredrikstad.

== Etymology ==
The Old Norse form of the name was Þórsnes, meaning " Thor's headland". The neighbouring island has the name Ullerøy, from the name of the god Ullr. An old farm in the parish, close to the church site, has the name Tose or Thorsø. This is derived from Old Norse Þórshof, a compound of Þórr (Thor) and hof, meaning "Thor's temple".
