= Øyvind Anker =

Norwegian librarian

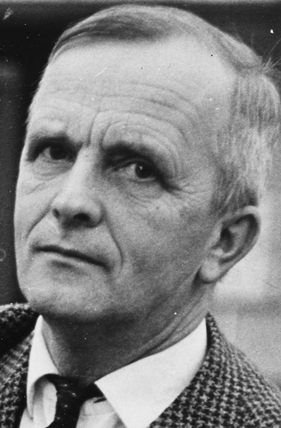
- Born: 13 July 1904; Frankfurt am Main
- Died: 30 December 1989 (aged 85)
- Occupation: librarian

Øyvind Anker (13 July 1904 – 30 December 1989) was a Norwegian librarian.

== Personal life ==
He was born in Frankfurt am Main as a son of engineer Nils Botvid Anker (1878–1943) and artist and pianist Gudrun Nilssen (1875–1958). He grew up in Vestre Aker and Lillehammer. He was a brother of Synnøve Anker Aurdal, and through her a brother-in-law of Ludvig Eikaas. Through another sister Ella he was a brother-in-law of Frede Castberg. He was a great-grandson of Peter Martin Anker, grandson of Herman Anker, nephew of Katti Anker Møller (and her husband Kai Møller) and Ella Anker, grandnephew of Nils Anker, Christian August Anker and Dikka Møller, and a first cousin of Peter Martin Anker and Tove Mohr.

In March 1933 he married pianist Eva Høst (1908–1968).

== Career ==
He finished his secondary education in 1923, attended the Norwegian Military Academy for one year before studying at the Royal Frederick University. He graduated with the cand.philol. degree in Norwegian in 1931, with the master's thesis Bjørnson og Grundtvig inntil 1872. He had been hired at the University Library of Oslo already in 1929, and continued working there after graduating. From 1936 he was the manager of the Norwegian National Music Collection, but on 20 August 1943 he was arrested by Nazi Germans as a part of World War II. He was imprisoned in the prisoner-of-war camps Oflag XXI-C and Oflag III-A until the camps were liberated.

His first publication as a librarian was Rikard Nordraak. Samlede verker with Olav Gurvin in 1942. The two published the music encyclopedia Musikkleksikon in 1949, and Anker had also edited the general encyclopedia Nyco konversasjonsleksikon together with Rolf Haffner in 1935. Anker co-edited volumes 13 through 19 of the biographical dictionary Norsk Biografisk Leksikon from 1957 to 1983. He also made research and lectured on theatre history, collected and published letters from Bernhard Dunker, Amalie Skram, Henrik Ibsen and Bjørnstjerne Bjørnson, and wrote a biography on Karoline Bjørnson. He was a subeditor of the journal Norsk Musikkliv from 1946 to 1950, and Norwegian editor of Nordisk tidskrift för bok- och biblioteksväsen from 1954 to 1965.

Anker was a board member of Norsk Samfunn for Musikkgransking and the Norwegian Folk Music Research Association, and chairman of Teaterhistorisk Selskap. He was a member of the Norwegian Academy for Language and Literature from 1953 (and secretary from 1969 to 1979) and of the Norwegian Academy of Science and Letters from 1965. He died in December 1989 in Oslo.
