= Peter Anker (disambiguation) =

Peter Anker (1744–1832) was a Dano-Norwegian governor.

Peter Anker may also refer to:

- Peter Martin Anker (politician) (1801–1863), Norwegian politician
- Peter Martin Anker (diplomat) (1903–1977), Norwegian diplomat
- Peter Anker (art historian) (1927–2012), Norwegian art historian
