= Ella Anker =

Norwegian journalist (1870–1958)

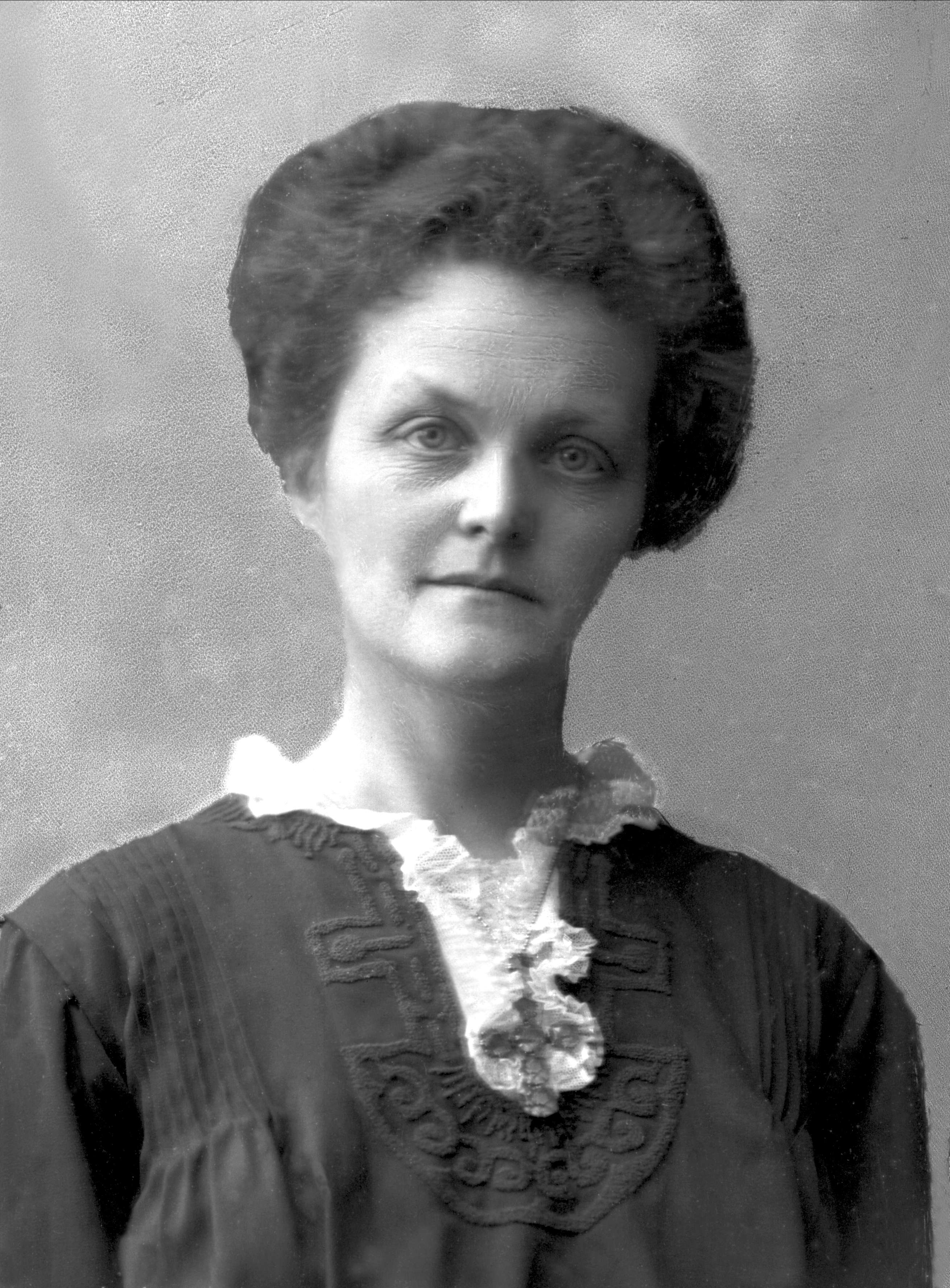
Ella Anker in 1914

Eli Birgit "Ella" Anker (2 June 1870 – 20 April 1958) was a Norwegian magazine journalist, newspaper correspondent, playwright, feminist, and pamphleteer.

== Personal life ==
She was born at Sagatun Folk High School in Vang in Hedmark to Herman Anker (1839–1896) and Danish citizen Marie Elisabeth "Mix" Bojsen (1843–1892). She was a sister of Katti Anker Møller and sister-in-law of Kai Møller, granddaughter of Peter Martin Anker, niece of Nils Anker, Christian August Anker and Dikka Møller, first cousin of Johan Anker and aunt of Tove Mohr, Øyvind Anker, Synnøve Anker Aurdal and Peter Martin Anker.

From December 1892 to 1906 she was married to Vilhelm Dunker Dons (1868–1908), a grandson of Vilhelmine Ullmann. Through her husband's sisters she was a sister-in-law of Nils Kjær and Jens Thiis. She died in April 1958 in Oslo.

== Career ==
She finished her secondary education at Ragna Nielsen's school in Kristiania in 1887 and took the examen philosophicum in 1888. In 1892 she was the first female board member of the Norwegian Students' Society, but the whole board was excluded for agitating against the Norwegian flag with union badge. From 1902 to 1904 she worked as a private secretary for Liberal Party politician Wollert Konow (H), who was also married to a maternal aunt of hers She was active in political parties, but from the Liberal Party she joined the Labour Democrats in 1890, then the Social Democratic Labour Party in 1926 and the Labour Party in 1927. She stood for parliamentary election; as third ballot candidate for the Radical People's Party (Labour Democrats) in Akershus in 1921.

After her husband's death she worked as subeditor for the weekly magazine Hver 8de Dag, and a Dagbladet correspondent in Rome. From 1910 to 1920 she was a correspondent in London for several newspapers, including Dagbladet and Verdens Gang. From 1923 she worked in the women's magazine Norges Kvinder. She co-founded the Anglo-Norse Society in 1918 and founded the Anglo-Norse Society in Oslo (Norwegian: Norsk-Britisk Forening) in 1921; for this she was decorated with the Order of the British Empire.

Anker had a sizeable authorship, and agitated for many issues. She was an adherent to Spiritism and Christianity, and wrote books such as Personlighetens liv efter døden ('The Life of Personality After Death', 1911), Ukjendte kræfter ('Unknown Forces', 1912) and Til vern om den kristne moral ('To Guard the Christian Moral', 1950). She also supported the controversial Norwegian claim to "Erik the Red's Land", and wrote several publications about this: the books Grønland for Norge ('Greenland for Norway', 1923) and Norges rett til Eirik Raude's land ('Norway's Right to Erik the Red's Land', 1931), and also the piece in Norges Kvinder in 1931, Det norske folks undergang på Grønland under danskestyret ('The Downfall of the Norwegian People of Greenland under Danish Rule'), and the play Eirik Raude about Erik the Red. Another play which is remembered today is Olavsbilæte (1923). She also agitated for peace between nations, child benefit, for giving wage to mothers (1928's book Mødrelønn) and total prohibition. Her 1936 book about her father and his folk high school, Sagatun. Herman Ankers liv og virke, was reissued in 1950.
