= Anglo-Norse =

Anglo-Norse may refer to:

- The Anglo-Norse Society in London
- SS Anglo-Norse, a number of ships
- Anglo-Scandinavian, a culture formed through the interaction of Anglo-Saxon and Scandinavian groups
