= Peter Martin Anker (diplomat) =

Norwegian diplomat (1903–1977)

Peter Martin Anker (21 March 1903 – 7 January 1977) was a Norwegian diplomat. He worked for the League of Nations, Red Cross and United Nations before, during and after the Second World War. He was then an ambassador in European, Asian and African countries from 1951 to 1973. He was stationed in six countries, but with side responsibilities for other countries, he was an ambassador in fifteen countries during his career (with Austria counted twice).

== Personal life ==
He was a son of physician Peter Martin Anker (1872–1903) and Marie Reimers (1871–1958), a member of the Anker family. He was a great-grandson of Peter Martin Anker, grandson of Herman Anker, nephew of Katti Anker Møller (and her husband Kai Møller) and Ella Anker, grandnephew of Nils Anker, Christian August Anker and Dikka Møller, first cousin of Øyvind Anker, Synnøve Anker Aurdal and Tove Mohr, and uncle of Peter Martin Anker. In 1931 he married Harriet Celine Wedel Jarlsberg, a daughter of Peder Anker Wedel Jarlsberg and granddaughter of Einar Westye Egeberg.

== Career ==
He finished secondary education in 1921, took the law degree in 1926, and was hired in the Norwegian Ministry of Foreign Affairs in 1927. He was an attaché at the Norwegian legation in Paris before returning to Norway as a secretary in 1929. He worked for the League of Nations before World War II, being hired as a secretary in 1931. He was a secretary in the observatory commission in Alexandrette from 1936 to 1937, the later Hatay State.

During the war he worked out of Geneva for Norwegians imprisoned in Germany. He also represented Norway in the International Red Cross from 1942 to 1946. He worked in the United Nations from 1946 to 1948, among others as a secretary for the UN scrutiny commission in Samoa in 1947. He was then a deputy under-secretary of state in the Ministry of Foreign Affairs from 1948 to 1951, and also an advisor to the Norwegian United Nations delegation. He was the Norwegian ambassador to Switzerland (and Austria) from 1951 to 1955, and in 1955 he was appointed as ambassador to West Germany. The position also covered Czechoslovakia and Hungary. In 1958 he became ambassador in Austria, a position which previously had been covered by the ambassador to Switzerland. He became ambassador to Greece in 1960 before succeeding Ivar Lunde as ambassador to Turkey in 1962. The position also covered Iraq, and from 1965 Kuwait. From 1966 to 1973 he was the ambassador to Egypt/the United Arab Republic. The position also covered Sudan and Ethiopia from 1967, Lebanon from 1968 and Jordan from 1969.

He issued the books Le Système des Mandats in 1945 and Frihetens gisler. Hjelpearbeidet for de norske fangene 1940–45 in 1971. He was decorated as a Knight of the Order of St. Olav (1952) and the Legion of Honour, and received the Grand Cross of the Order of George II, the Order of Merit of the Federal Republic of Germany and the Grand Decoration of Honour in Gold with Sash for Services to the Republic of Austria.

He died in 1977 and was buried at Vestre gravlund.

Diplomatic posts
Preceded by Dag Bryn	Norwegian ambassador to West Germany; 1955–1958	Succeeded by Hersleb Vogt
