= Halden =

Halden Municipality Halden kommune
- Municipality
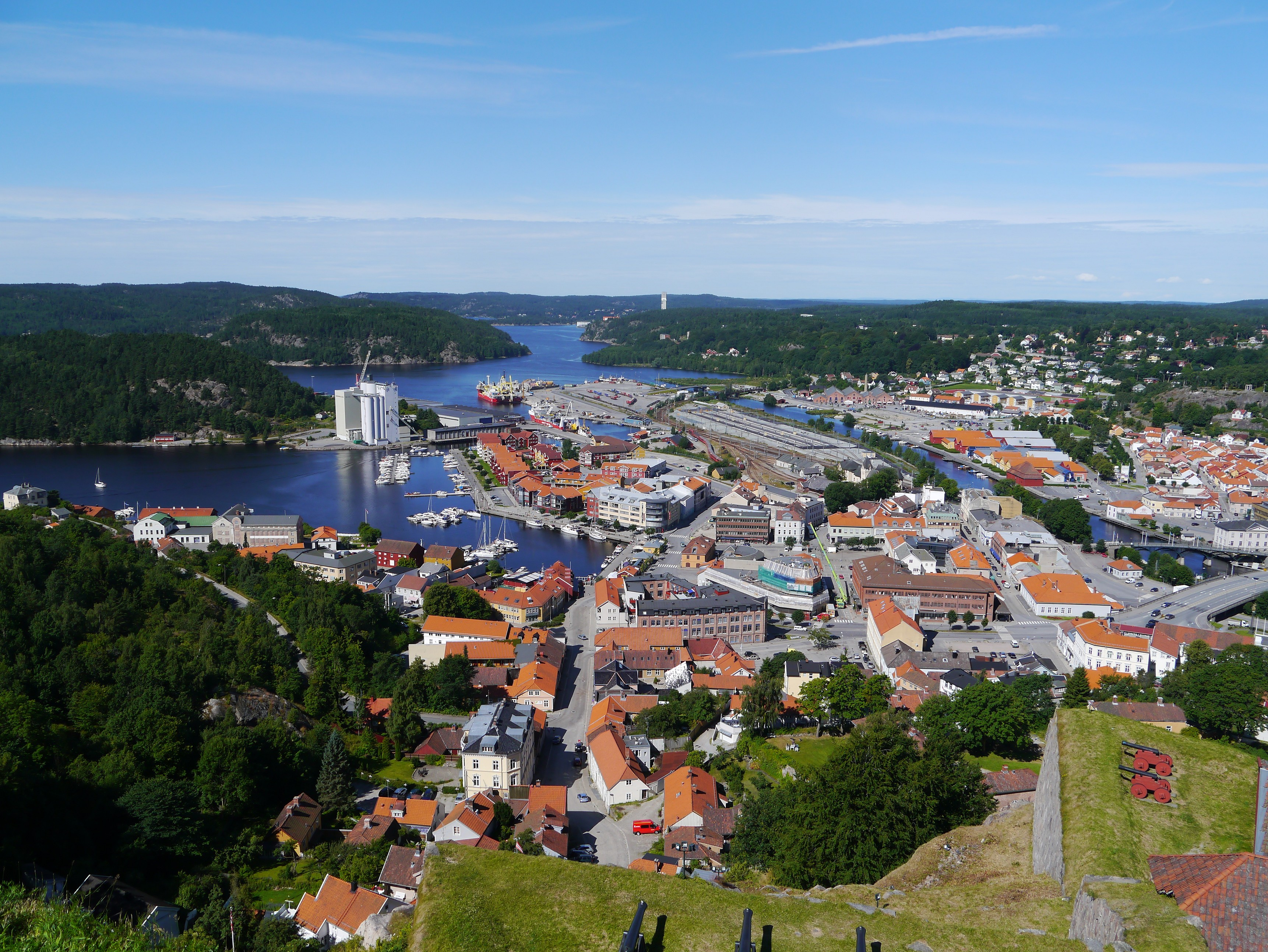
- Halden as seen from the Fredriksten fortress in mid-July 2012

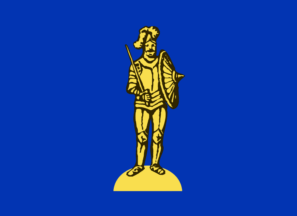
- Flag Coat of arms

- Østfold within Norway

- Halden within Østfold
- Coordinates: 59°7′16″N 11°22′56″E
- Country: Norway
- County: Østfold
- Administrative centre: Halden

Government
  - Mayor (2023): Fredrik Holm (H)

Area
  - Total: 642 km^{2} (248 sq mi)
  - Land: 596 km^{2} (230 sq mi)
  - Rank: #173 in Norway

Population (2020)
  - Total: 31 387
  - Rank: #18 in Norway
  - Density: 46/km^{2} (120/sq mi)
  - Change (10 years): ▲ +6%
- Demonym: Haldenser/Haldensar

Official language
  - Norwegian form: Bokmål
- Time zone: UTC+01:00 (CET)
  - Summer (DST): UTC+02:00 (CEST)
- ISO 3166 code: NO-3101
- Website: Official website

Halden (pronounced [ˈhɑ̀ɫdn̩]), between 1665 and 1928 known as Fredrikshald, is both a town and a municipality in Østfold county, Norway. The municipality borders Sarpsborg to the northwest, Rakkestad to the north and Aremark to the east, as well as the Swedish municipalities Strömstad, Tanum and Dals-Ed respectively to the southwest, south and southeast.

The seat of the municipality, Halden is a border town located at the mouth of the Tista river on the Iddefjord, the southernmost border crossing between Norway and Sweden. The town of Halden is located about 120 km (75 mi) south of Oslo, 190 km (120 mi) north of Gothenburg, and 12 km (7.5 mi) west of the border crossing at Svinesund.

== History ==
Evidence of early human settlements in this region of Norway have been found, particularly in the Svinesund area of the municipality where evidence of early settlements from the Nordic Bronze Age have been found. Named after a small farm Hallen (English: "rise" or "slope") first mentioned in 1629, "Halden", became the city of Fredrikshald in 1665, named after Frederick III of Denmark. The Gud med oss (God be with us) coat-of-arms created in 1665 shows a knight standing on a mountain, yellow on a blue background, and was inspired by the bravery of the citizens of the city in the Dano-Swedish War (1658–1660).

Swedish forces unsuccessfully attempted to invade the town six times between 1658 and 1814. As a reference to the town's citizens burning their own houses to prevent them being taken on 4 July 1716 by the forces of King Charles XII of Sweden, Halden is one of only two cities mentioned in Norway's national anthem. In 1718, the Great Northern War ended when Charles XII was shot and killed at the Fredriksten fortress. The fortress had been erected in the 17th century as a replacement for the Bohus Fortress lost at the Treaty of Roskilde in 1658 when Bohuslän was ceded to Sweden. Halden has never been captured by force by any invading army, although it was occupied by Nazi forces in WWII.

In an 1835 census, Fredrikshald was the seventh largest town or city in Norway, with 4,921 inhabitants. In 1838, Fredrikshald became a city municipality (Norwegian: herred), and in 1928, the name was changed back to Halden. Tistedalen, which is 4 kilometres (2 mi) east of Halden, was part of the city from 1686 to 1967, until it was separated from Halden. At the same time, the area of Halden, Tistedalen, and the rural municipalities of Berg and Idd, became the Halden municipality on 1 January 1967.

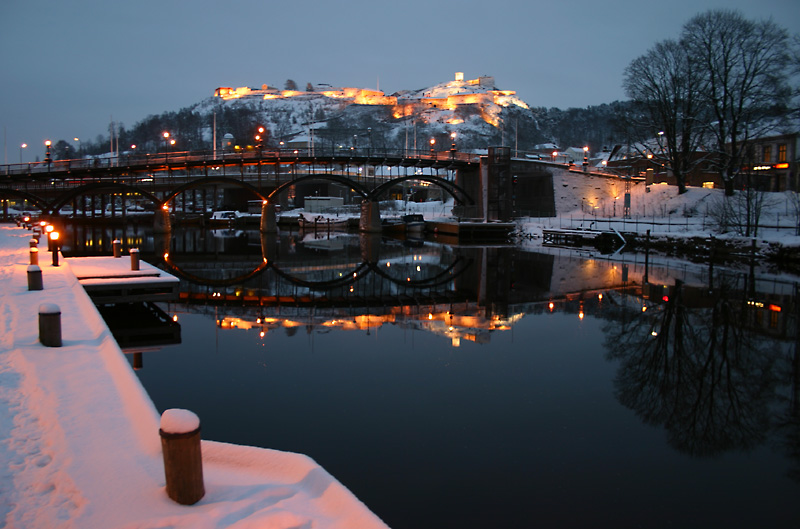
Halden's fortress and town bridge.

== Politics ==
The political situation in Halden has become infamous in Norway for conflicts between individual politicians and between local political parties. The municipality is governed by the Conservative Party, the Liberal Party, the Christian Democratic Party, the Centre Party, and the Green Party.

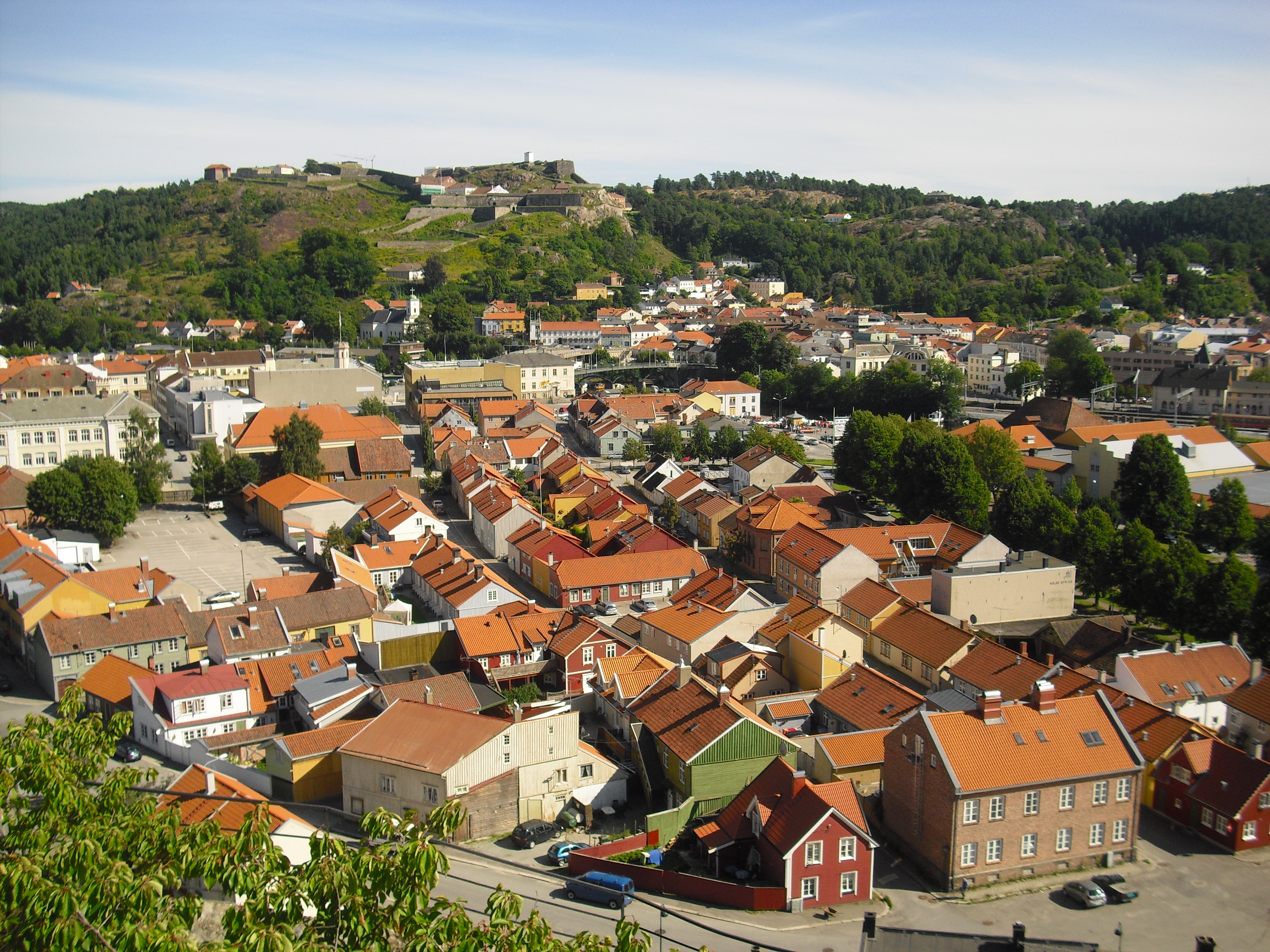
Overview photo of Halden, with Fredriksten fortress visible

== Economy ==
The slogan, Halden, IT- og Miljøbyen (Halden, IT and Environment City), is a reference to Halden's relatively large number of information technology companies. In the late 1960s, the most powerful mainframe computer in Norway at the time was located at the Institute for Energy Technology's facilities in Halden. From the 1960s-1980s, Halden was infamous for high levels of industrial pollution, largely originating from the Norske Skog Saugbrugs paper mill (part of Norske Skog since 1989). As a result of projects initiated by both Norske Skog-Saugbrugs and the city authorities, the polluted fjords and rivers of Halden have been cleaned up and the city was dubbed Norway's Environment City in 1996.

One of Norway's two nuclear reactors under decommissioning is located in Halden. The Halden Boiling Water Reactor is a research reactor located 100 metres (328 ft) within Månefjell, adjacent to the Saugbrugs paper mill. The OECD Halden Reactor Project is one of the world's longest running international research collaborations and is the largest international research project in Norway. While the reactor closed in 2018, safety-oriented research collaboration for the nuclear power industry has continued, focusing primarily on human-technology-organisation research. In 2024, Halden municipality took part in the creation of Halden Kjernekraft AS and initiated investigation for the possible construction of a Small Modular Reactor; a location has since been identified. IFE's Man-Technology-Organisation Lab facility in Os Alle was opened by the Prince Regent in 2004 and houses the most recent incarnations of the Halden Man-Machine Laboratory (HAMMLAB) and Halden Virtual Reality Centre's (HVRC) VR laboratory. IFE also has advanced robotics and cybersecurity labs in Halden. The Halden Project at IFE has ensured a steady influx of international guest scientists to the city, many of whom made Halden their permanent homes.

Nexans has a large cable factory in Halden. The main products from this factory are submarine power cables, umbilical cables for subsea installations, and cable systems for heating of subsea pipelines.

== Rød Herregård ==
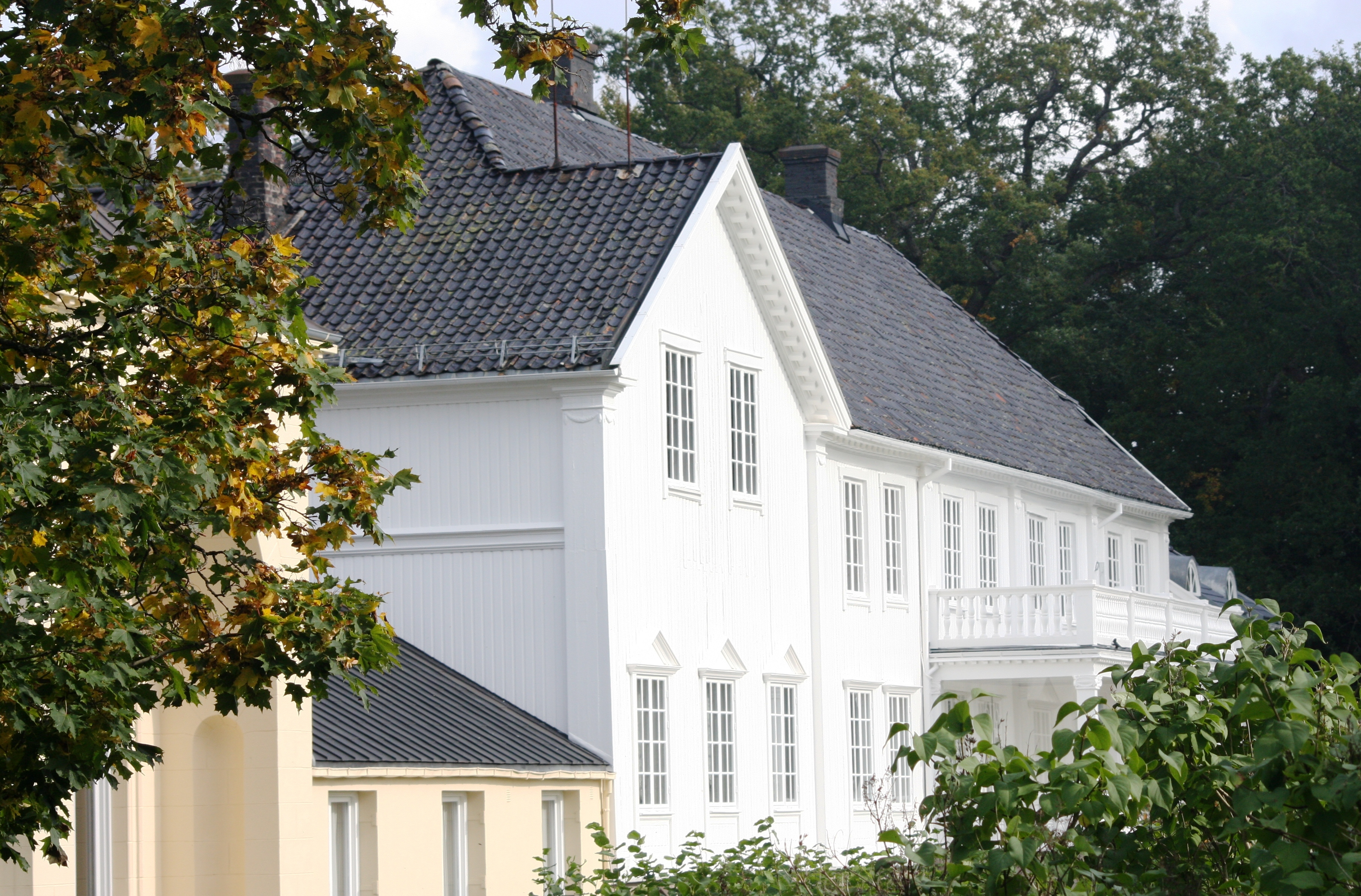
Rød Herregård

Rød Herregård in Halden is one of the best preserved manor houses in Norway. The property features well-preserved buildings, a Baroque garden and an English landscape garden. The buildings have their oldest origins of the late 1600s, but were largely built during the last half of the 1700s. The main building contains authentic furnishings including period furniture, hunting trophies, an extensive collection of art and a large weapons collection.

Rød Herregård was owned and inhabited by members of the Tank and Anker families from 1733 including Carsten Tank and Nils Otto Tank as well as Peter Martin Anker and Nils Anker. The manor house and estate complex was owned by the Tank family through three generations, from 1733 to 1829. Both Danish Crown Prince regent Christian Frederik and Swedish Crown Prince and Regent Charles John were guests at the mansion. The estate was visited by English economist Thomas Robert Malthus during his European tour in 1799.

In 1961, two foundations were established to maintain the historic property. Rød Manor Foundation (Stiftelsen Rød Herregård) is responsible for the manor house, buildings and gardens. Ankerske Foundation Collections (Stiftelsen De Ankerske Samlinger) is responsible for the contents and the rich archives related to the property.

== Notable sights ==
Halden sights include the Halden Canal system, the two Svinesund bridges, and Høiåsmasten, a partially guyed TV tower. The fortress of Fredriksten has historical museums, and the Østfold University College (Høgskolen i Østfold) is in Halden which offer business, social sciences, foreign language, computer science and education.

Petroglyphs (rock carvings) dated from the Nordic Bronze Age are found around town, some locally, but more impressive are ones found along Oldtidsveien, the historical road between Halden and Fredrikstad some 20 km (12 mi) north, and around Tanum in Sweden, some 60 km (37 mi) to the south. Jellhaugen, a major tumulus (grave mound) is found west of town, situated only 120 feet away from the site of the later discovered Gjellestad Ship.

== Nature ==
Halden is surrounded by forests and water, so hiking and fishing locations can easily be found. Deer and elk are a common sight, and wolves have also been observed in the district along the border with Sweden. Raspberries, blackberries, blueberries, wild cranberries, and many varieties of mushroom can be found in the woods in the early autumn. Popular destinations for hikers and other nature lovers include Prestebakke and Kornsjø.

Halden's meteorological station is at Buer.

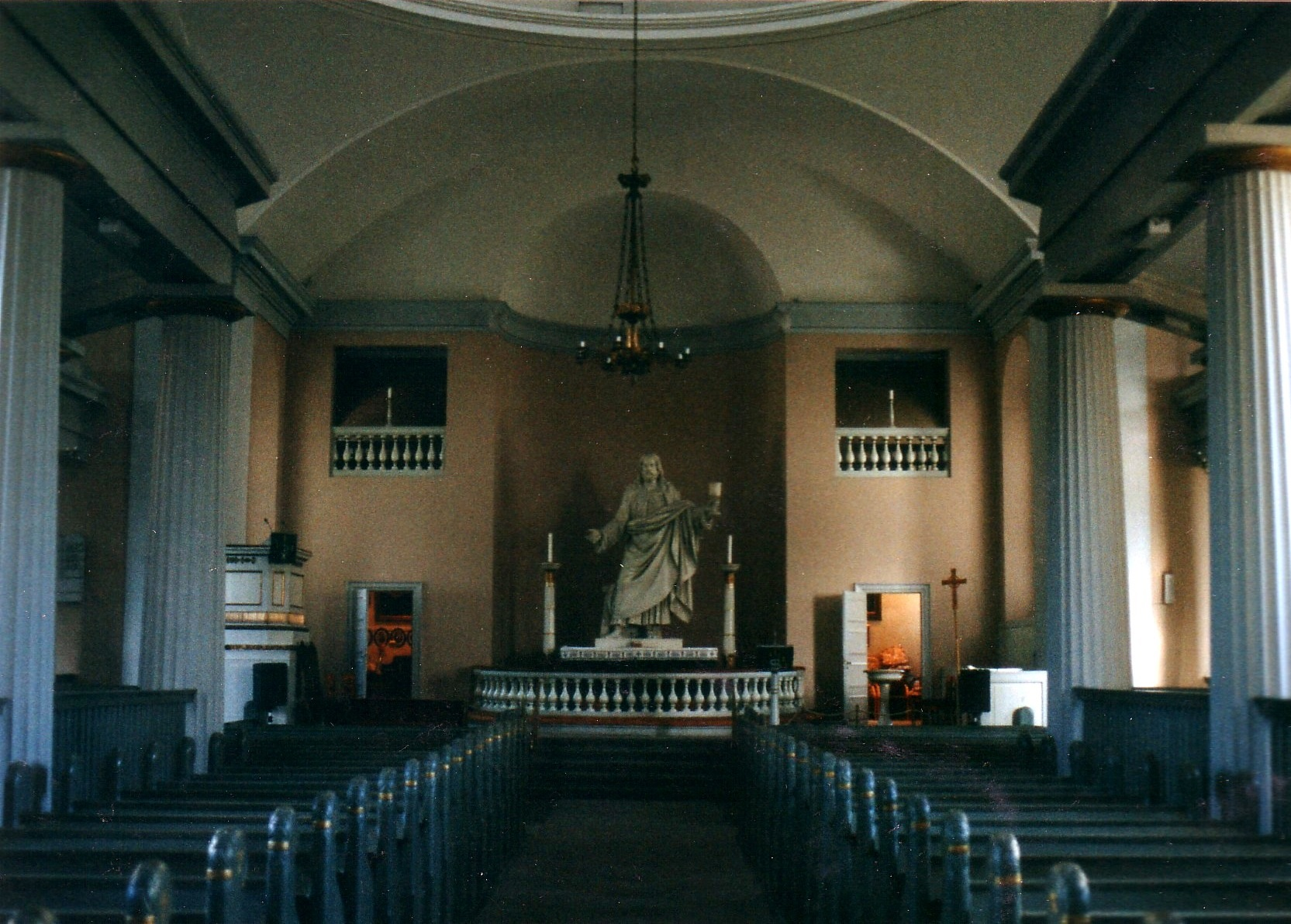
Immanuel Church in Halden

== Gjellestad ship burial ==
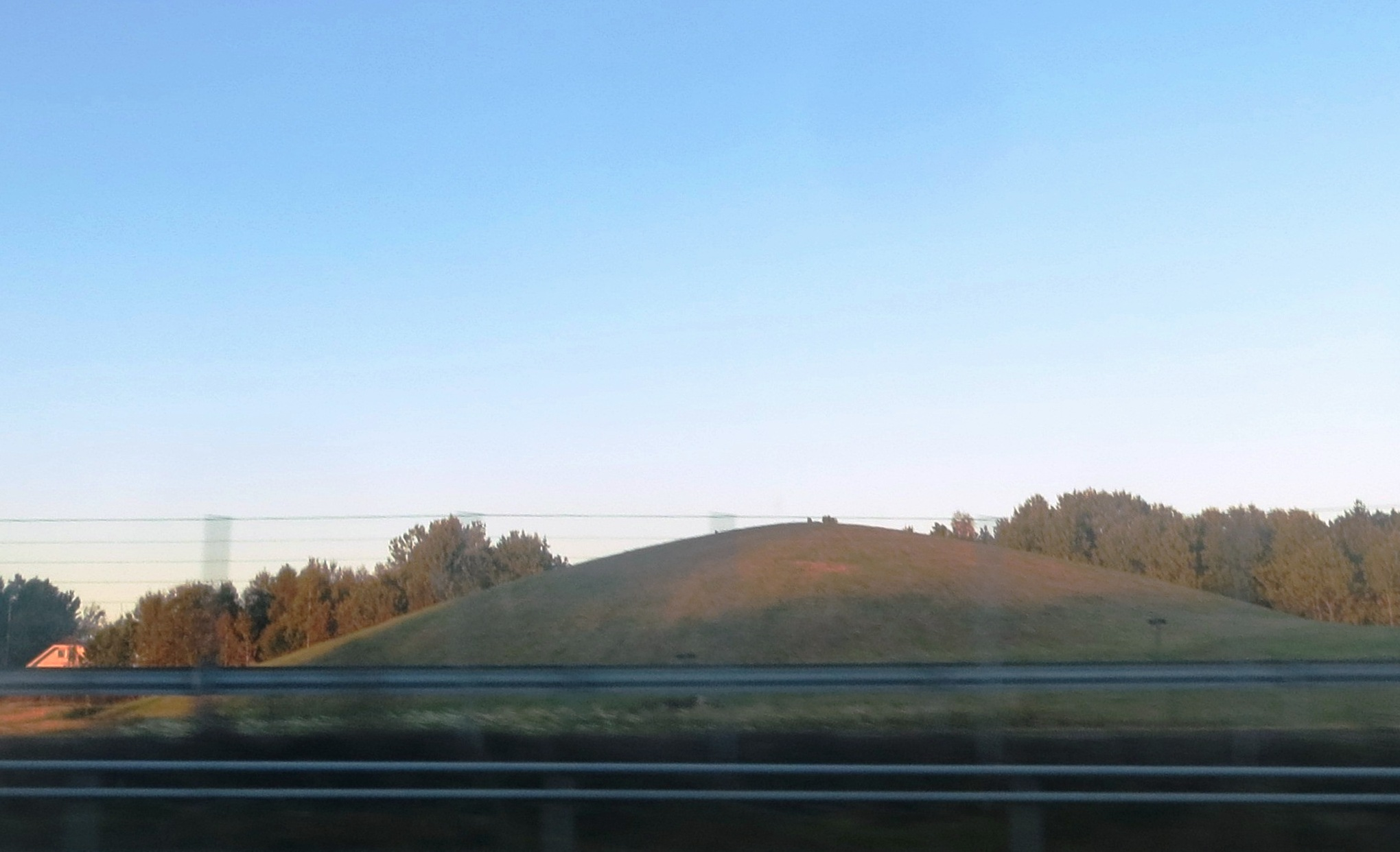
A Viking burial mound at Gjellestad. The Jellhaugen Mound was probably built in the 6th century, about 300 years before the burial of the Gjellestad ship.

The Gjellestad (Norwegian pronunciation: [ˈjɛ̂lːəˌstɑːd]) ship, also spelt Jellestad, is the remains of a Viking Age longship found at the farm of Gjellestad in Halden municipality in Norway in 2018 by the archeologists Lars Gustavsen and Erich Nau. A 2019 examination by the University of Oslo has dated it to earliest AD 733. Originally interred beneath a burial mound, in the present day the ship lies 40 centimetres below the topsoil due to years of ploughing.

Due to extensive fungus damage to the hull caused by field drainage, drought and exposure to the air, archaeologists called for an immediate dig to save the ship. Excavation of the ship at Gjellestad began in June 2020, and is led by Christian L. Rødsrud of the Museum of Cultural History. It is estimated to be over 20 metres long, although only parts of the keel have survived. This would mean that the boat is of a similar size to the Gokstad ship. The identity of the boat's occupant has not yet been confirmed, but experts have speculated that it may have belonged to a king or queen.

== Culture ==
Outdoor concerts are frequently held at the fortress while the local churches, pubs, and student union are regular venues for indoor concerts. Musicians recorded by the Hitsville and Athletic Sound studios in the Halden region include Motorpsycho, Madrugada, Morten Harket, and Kurt Nilsen. The city's intimate theatre hosts frequent plays by national and local theatre groups, and occasionally serves as a concert hall.

Halden festivals include Tons of Rock (hard rock and metal) in June each year (from 2014 before the festival was moved to Oslo in 2019) and a vegetarian food festival in August.

Artists born in Halden that are represented in the Norwegian National Gallery in Oslo include Thomas Fearnley (1802–1842) and Jacob Mathias Calmeyer (1802–1883). Fearnley is locally exhibited at the manor house Rød Herregård. Other significant artists that lived in Halden, but were not born there, include Johannes Fintoe (1786–1870) and Heinrich August Grosch (1763–1843). Grosch's son, Christian Heinrich Grosch (1801–1865), who moved with his parents to Halden at the age of ten, became an influential architect, whose works include seventy-eight churches (including Immanuel Church in Halden), the Bank of Norway, the Oslo Stock Exchange, and the original university buildings in Oslo.

Current archaeological excavations includes Jellestadskipet (Gjellestadskipet) located a stone's throw from Jellhaugen; it was first photographed in 2018.

Number of minorities (1st and 2nd generation) in Halden by country of origin in 2017
Ancestry	Number
Kosovo	566
Poland	483
Sweden	419
Somalia	342
Iraq	196
Denmark	145
Syria	135
Lithuania	133
Iran	107
Germany	107

=== Sports ===
The Halden VBK volleyball club plays in the Premier Division, and while the local ice hockey team Comet did play in the GET-league (Norway's highest ice hockey division) for some years, but they ran into some financial problems in 2008/2009, and is now in division 1. Halden also has many football clubs, the biggest of them, Kvik Halden FK, plays in the Norwegian Second Division. The two handball clubs, Tistedalens TIF in the first division and HK Halden, have teams for children, youth and adults.

One of Norway's few curling centres lies in Halden. Halden Curling Center is host to East-Norway 1 division. In addition there is a separate amateur league with two divisions. Several curlers from Halden have won Norwegian championships and competed internationally.

Halden's forests are a good place for orienteering; and hiking, canoeing, boating, fishing, and gymnastics are also popular sports amongst Halden's population.

== Halden's prison ==
Halden fengsel is one of Norway's highest-security jails. It has acquired a “reputation as the world's most humane prison.” The architectural design of this prison is not like other prisons. The conditions inside the prison have been made as much like life outside the walls as possible. It is in fact to create an environment “as unprisonlike as possible.” This reflects the flagship of the Norwegian justice system, which focuses on rehabilitation rather than punishment.

To explore what makes incarceration in Norway different from being imprisoned in other countries, British journalist Raphael Rowe spent a week at Halden Prison for the Netflix documentary Inside the World's Toughest Prisons (Season 3, Episode 4).

== Notable residents ==
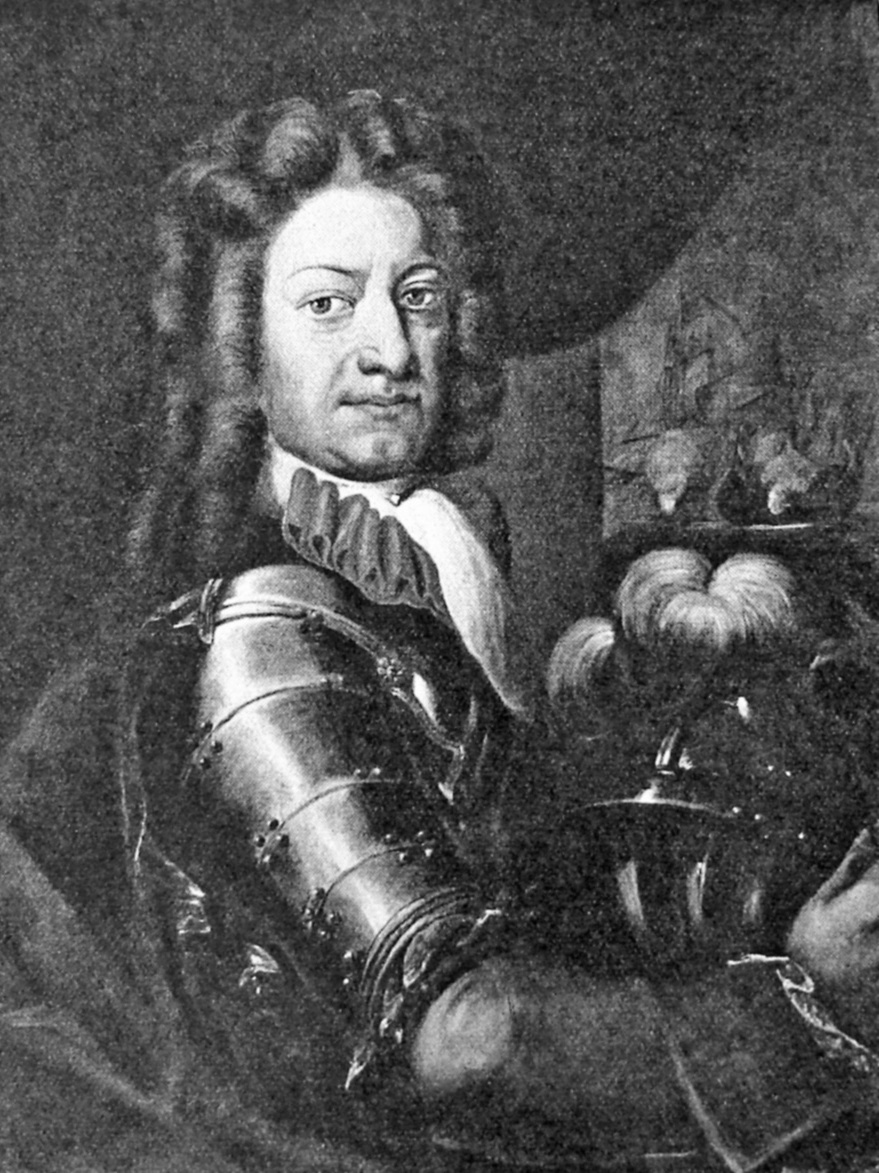
Iver Huitfeldt

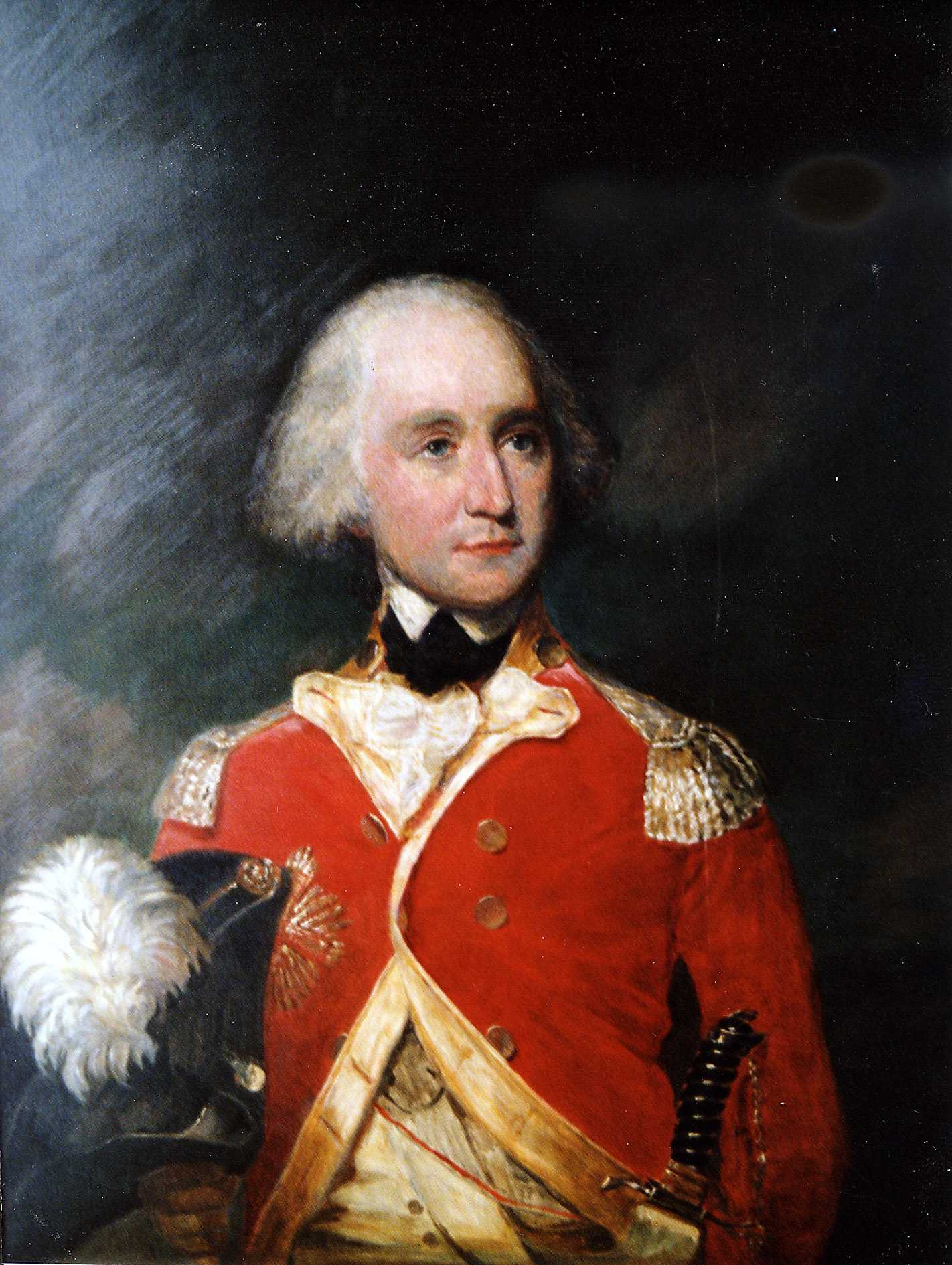
Peter Anker, 1814

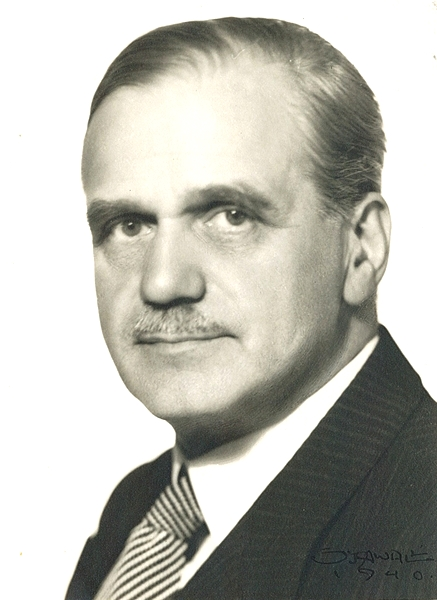
Alf Whist, 1940

=== Public Service & public thinking ===
- Iver Huitfeldt (1665 in Halden – 1710) naval commander in the Dano-Norwegian fleet
- Ove Gjerløw Meyer (ca.1742 in Fredrikshald – 1790) jurist, founded the Norwegian Society
- Peter Anker (1744 in Fredrikshald – 1832) a diplomat, military officer and colonial general
- Hans Jacob Arnold Jensen (1777 - 1853 in Fredrikshald) a military officer and politician
- Carl von und zu Mansbach (1790 in Halden – 1867) Hessian-Norwegian army officer & diplomat
- Nils Otto Tank (1800 near Halden – 1864) a Moravian Church religious leader in Wisconsin
- Christian Heinrich Grosch (1801–1865) an architect, lived in Fredrikshald from 1811
- Christian August Selmer (1816 in Fredrikshald – 1889) a Norwegian lawyer and a magistrate; Prime Minister of Norway 1880 to 1884
- Carl Frederik Fearnley (1818 in Fredrikshald - 1890) a Norwegian astronomer
- Torkel Halvorsen Aschehoug (1822 in Idd – 1909) legal scholar, historian and social economist
- Peter Ludwig Mejdell Sylow (1832–1918) mathematician, headmaster in Halden 1858 to 1898
- Herman Anker (1839 at Rød Manor – 1896) a Norwegian school teacher and educationalist
- Christian August Anker (1840 in Halden – 1912) developed mining and wood-processing
- Ragnvald Bødtker (1859–1946) an engineer, director of log driving in Halden for 42 years
- Jens Andersen (1866 in Idd – 1937) a shoemaker and shoe factory owner
- Andreas Tostrup Urbye (1869 in Fredrikshald – 1955) a civil servant, lawyer and politician
- Theodor Haagaas (1873 in Tistedalen – 1961) a mathematician and private school owner
- Birger Braadland (1879 in Idd – 1966) a politician, foreign minister 1931 to 1933
- Alf Whist (1880 in Fredrikshald – 1962) a Norwegian politician for Nasjonal Samling
- Carl Frølich Hanssen (1883 in Halden – 1960) head of the Norwegian Nazi Labour Service
- Niels Larsen Bruun (1893 in Fredrikshald – 1970) an officer in the Royal Norwegian Navy
- Eva Kolstad (1918 in Halden – 1999) politician and strong promoter of gender equality
- Rolf B. Wegner (born 1940) a lawyer and former chief of police, grew up in Halden
- Christen Ager-Hanssen (born 1962 in Halden) an internet entrepreneur & venture capitalist
- Håkon Wium Lie (born 1965 in Halden) a Norwegian web pioneer and standards activist

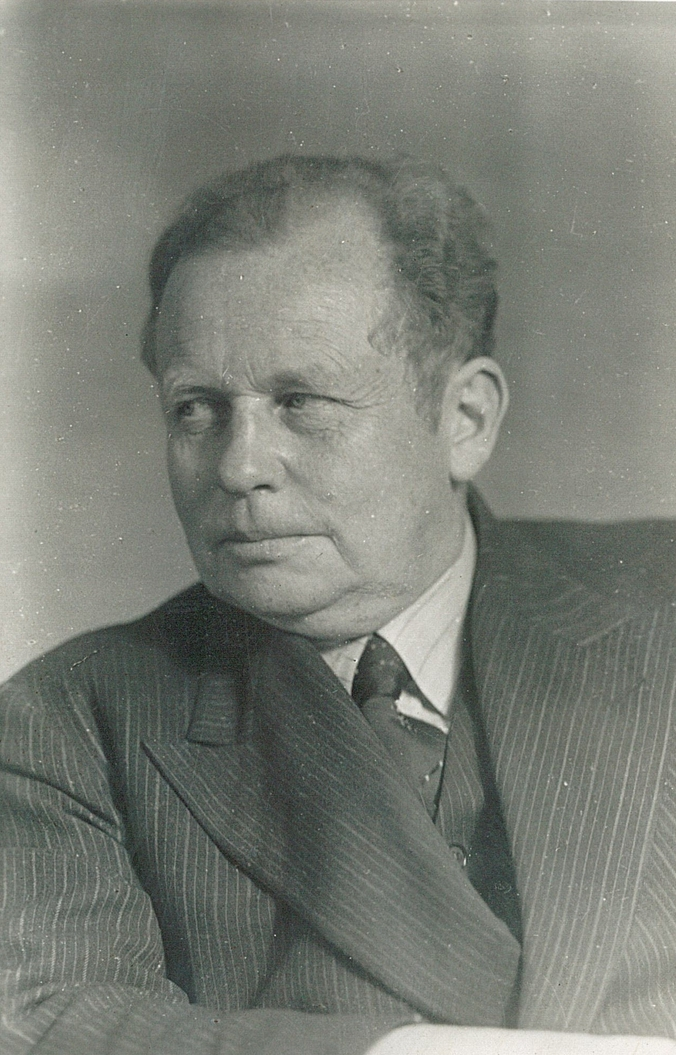
Egil Hjorth-Jensen, 1950

=== The Arts ===
- Thomas Fearnley (1802 in Fredrikshald – 1842) a Norwegian romantic painter
- Jacob Calmeyer (1802 in Fredrikshald – 1883) a Norwegian painter
- Annette Abigael Hamilton (1806 in Fredrikshald - 1879) a fairy-tale collector and author
- Henriette Wienecke (1819 in Fredrikshald -1907), a composer
- Alvilde Prydz (1846 near Fredrikshald – 1922) a Norwegian novelist
- Oscar Borg (1851 in Halden – 1930) composer of marches for wind bands and conductor
- Gustav Fredrik Lange (1861 in Halden – 1939) a violinist, violin teacher and composer
- Karl Ouren (1882 in Halden – 1943) an American artist of landscapes with winter and snow
- Sven Elvestad (1884 in Fredrikshald – 1934) a Norwegian journalist and author of crime novels
- Mon Schjelderup (1870 in Fredrikshald – 1934) a Norwegian composer and pianist
- Egil Hjorth-Jenssen (1893 in Fredrikshald – 1969) actor, theatre director and playwright
- Pehr Qværnstrøm (1878 in Halden – 1949) an actor, film director and scriptwriter
- Gunnar Olram (1908 in Halden – 2001) a Norwegian actor and stage instructor
- Henning Kvitnes (born 1958 in Tistedalen) Singer/songwriter (Rock/roots)
- Knut Nærum (born 1961 in Halden) comedian, author, comics writer and TV-entertainer
- Harald Rønneberg (born 1973 in Halden) a Norwegian television personality

=== Sport ===
- Andreas Hagelund (1881 in Fredrikshald – 1967) a gymnast, team gold medallist at the 1906 Summer Olympics
- Erik Anker (1903 in Berg – 1994) a sailor, Olympic team gold medallist and businessperson.
- Johan Anker (1871 at Refne in Berg – 1940) a Norwegian sailor and yacht designer, competed in three Summer Olympics
- Thor Martinsen (born 1945 in Halden) an ice hockey player, competed in 4 Winter Olympics
- Svein Grøndalen (born 1955 in Halden) a former footballer with 77 caps for Norway
- Jørgen Strand Larsen (born 2000 in Halden) a footballer who currently plays for Crystal Palace F.C
- Ole Michael Holth (born 1988 in Halden) a would-be professional footballer if it wasn't for his knee injury. Currently plays for Trainor Elsikkerhet AS

== Twin towns – sister cities ==
Halden is twinned with:

- Ringsted, Denmark
- Sastamala, Finland
- Skövde, Sweden
