= Skolmen =

Skolmen is a surname. Notable people with the surname include:

- Christian Skolmen (born 1970), Norwegian actor and voice actor
- Eli Skolmen Ryg (born 1936), Norwegian television producer
- Jon Skolmen (1940–2019), Norwegian actor and comedian
- Kristian Skolmen (born 1863-1946), Norwegian teacher and artist
