= Holbrook-Palmer Estate =

- U.S. National Register of Historic Places
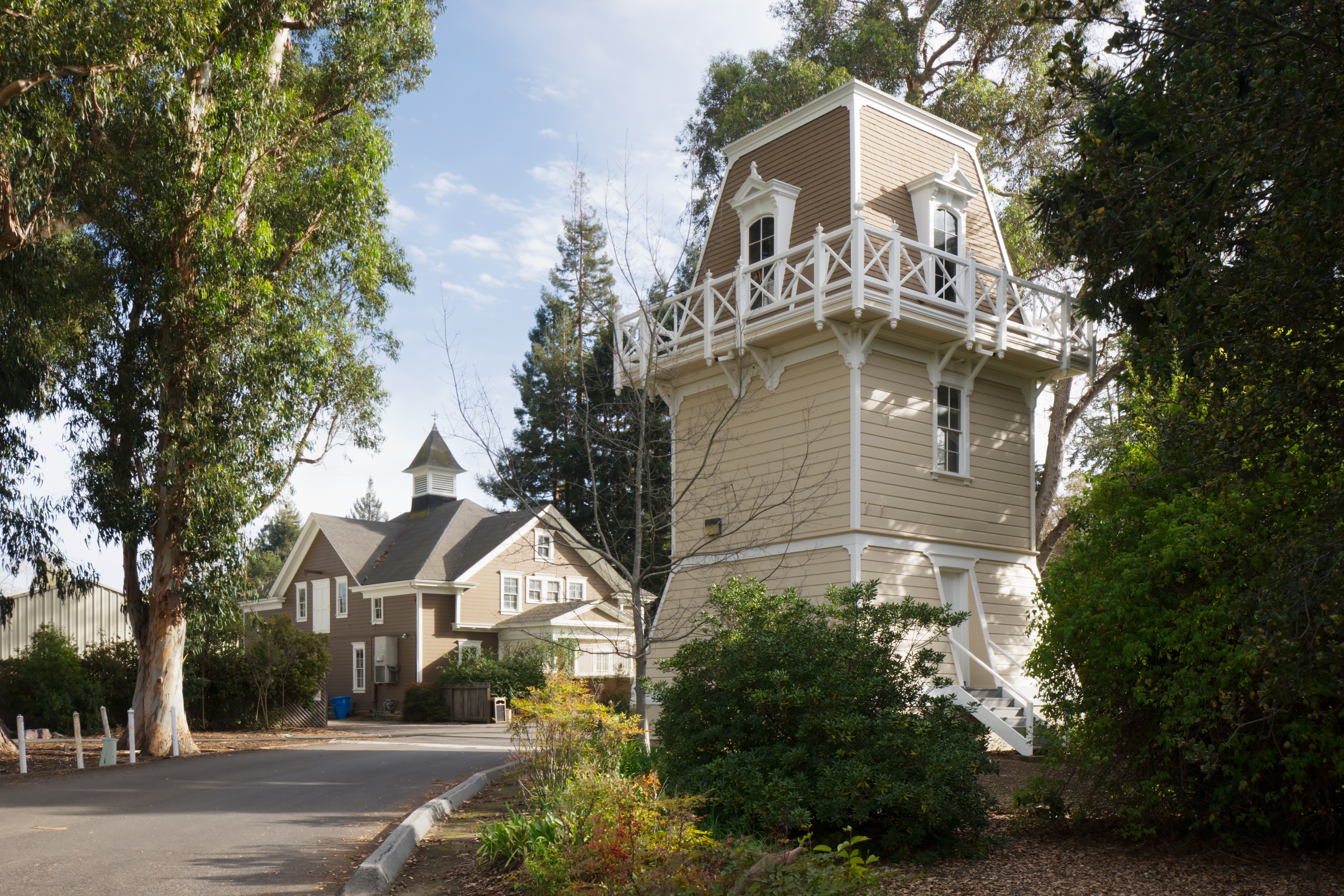
- The historic Carriage House and Water Tower in Holbrook-Palmer Park, Atherton, California

- Location within San Francisco Bay Area Location within California Location within the United States
- Location: 150 Watkins Avenue, Atherton, California
- Coordinates: 37°27′52″N 122°11′29.3″W
- Area: 22 acres (8.9 ha)
- Architect: Henry C. Macy
- Architectural style: Second Empire style, Colonial Revival-style
- NRHP reference No.: 16000663
- Added to NRHP: 2016

Holbrook-Palmer Estate, also known as Elmwood, is a historic estate and public park located at 150 Watkins Avenue in Atherton, California (the town was previously named Fair Oaks). The water tower (c.1883) and the carriage house (c.1897) were listed on the National Register of Historic Places on September 26, 2016.

== History ==
Charles C. Holbrook (1830–1926) was a successful wholesale hardware and mining supply store owner in San Francisco, he created the grand rural estate of Elmwood in the late 19th century. Beginning in 1883, the Holbrook family would summer in the house together and occasionally visit on the weekends during the slower seasons.

In 1926, Olive Holbrook Palmer (1878–1958) inherited the estate which was then named "Elmwood" which she used as her summer home with her spouse Silas H. Palmer (1874–1963). Their main house was in San Francisco, the 22-room Holbrook mansion located at the corner of Van Ness Street and Washington Street. Up until the mid-1950s, the estate was still operating as a farm and did not seem to have any major architectural or landscape changes. When Olive died in March of 1958, the couple did not have heirs; she willed the estate to the city of Atherton for recreational purposes.

== Architecture ==
The Elmwood water tower was built in c.1883, designed by San Francisco architect Henry C. Macy in a Second Empire style and is a rare example of a nineteenth-century tank house that was made in a less utilitarian style (in order to match the main house). The water tower is three stories tall and is built with lumber, featuring an ornamental balcony and a French mansard roof.

The main house was built c.1875 in the same Second Empire style, but was replaced in 1959.

The carriage house (also known as the Gen Merrill Carriage House) was built in c.1897 in a Colonial Revival style. The carriage house is two stories tall with the first floor featuring stables, a tack room and carriage storage, and a hay loft and bunkhouse in the second story. The carriage house features a hip and gable roof with asphalt shingles and redwood siding.

== See also ==
- National Register of Historic Places listings in San Mateo County, California
