= Carsten Tank =

Norwegian politician

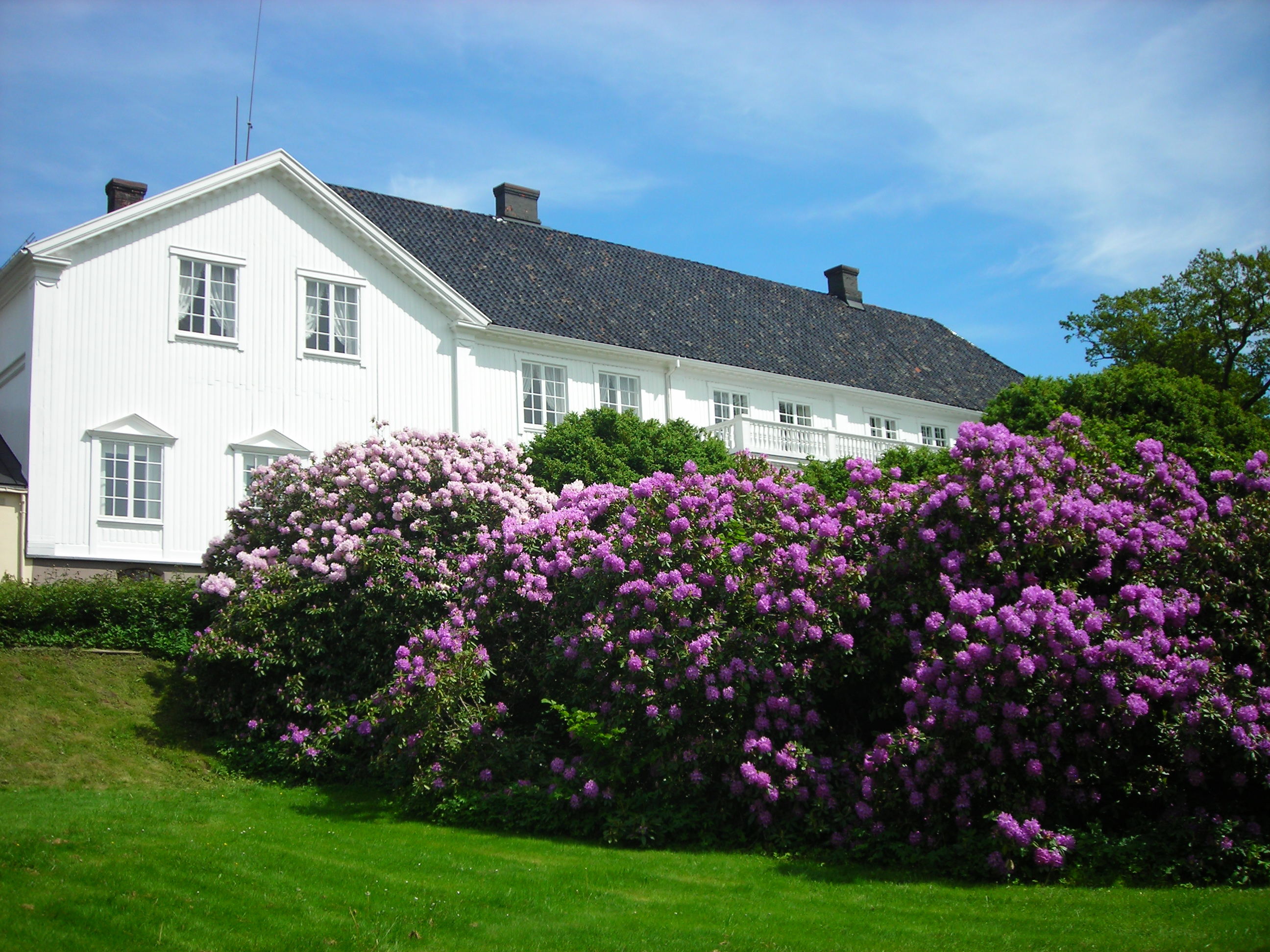
Rød Herregård

Carsten Tank (24 April 1766 – 28 January 1832) was a Norwegian businessman and politician who served as Norwegian councilor of government of the 1st Ministry (finance and taxes, March–November 1814), and later councilor of state of the same ministry.

== Biography ==
Carsten Tank was born at Rød Herregård, the family estate at Halden in Østfold County, Norway. Carsten Tank belonged to a branch of a wealthy timber merchant family. Carsten Tank's grandfather, Carsten Nielsen Tank was a merchant and acquired Rød Herregård in 1733. His parents were Nils Carstensen Tank (1725–1801) and Sophie Cathrine Leuch (1740–1778). Carsten Tank was a merchant and ship owner as well as being involved in the timber trade. He came to own numerous properties, a tobacco factory, several sawmills and large forests. He lost his fortune and in December 1829 had to file for bankruptcy.

== Personal life ==
Carsten Tank was married first to Bartha Sophie Leth (d. 1795) from Halden, and secondly to Catherine von Cappelen (1772–1837), sister of Didrich von Cappelen (1761–1828), who was the deputy for Skien to the Norwegian Constituent Assembly at Eidsvoll in 1814 which established the Constitution of Norway. His son, Nils Otto Tank (1800–1864) was the noted Moravian Church missionary to the Dutch colony of Suriname. His daughter, Petronelle Didrikke Cathrine, (died 1833) who married Peter Martin Anker inherited the family estate Rød Herregård.

== Rød Herregård ==
Rød Herregård in Halden is one of the best preserved manor houses in Norway. The property features well-preserved buildings, a Baroque garden and an English landscape garden. Some of the earliest buildings have their origins in the late 1600s, but others were largely built during the last half of the 1700s. The manor house and estate complex was owned by the Tank family through three generations, from 1733 to 1829. In 1961, two foundations were established to maintain the historic property. Rød Manor Foundation (Stiftelsen Rød Herregård) is responsible for the manor house, buildings and gardens. Ankerske Foundation Collections (Stiftelsen De Ankerske Samlinger) is responsible for the contents and the rich archives related to the property.

== Other sources ==
- Jostein Vormeland, Otto Tank – Pioneren fra Rød herregård (Oslo: Genesis Forlag. 1999) Norwegian
- E.A.Thomle, Familien (von) Cappelen i Norge og Danmark (Christiania: J. W. Cappelen. 1896) Norwegian
