= Erik Anker =

Norwegian sailor and businessperson

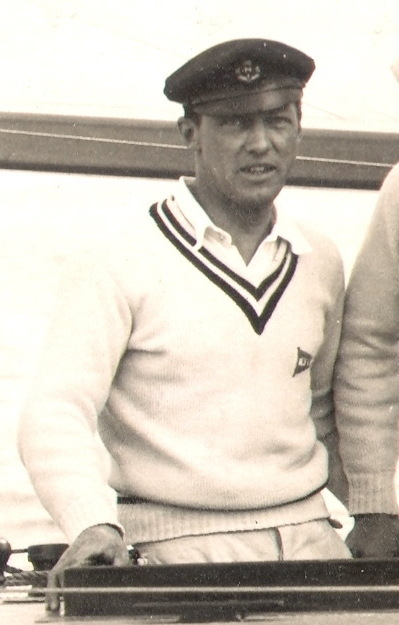
- Anker in 1928

Sailing career
- Sport: Sailing
Medal record
Men's sailing
Gold medal – first place	1928 Amsterdam	6 metre class

Erik Anker (15 October 1903 – 15 August 1994) was a Norwegian sailor and businessperson.

== Early life and Olympics ==
He was born in Berg, Østfold as a son of Johan Anker. He was a brother of Christian August Anker, and a stepson of Nini Roll Anker. He was married to Swedish citizen Eva Esther Laurell.

In sailing he represented the Royal Norwegian Yacht Club. At the 1928 Summer Olympics he won the gold medal as crew member of the Norwegian boat Norna in the 6 metre class event. The crew was Johan Anker, Erik Anker, Crown Prince Olav of Norway and Håkon Bryhn. Anker later chaired the Royal Norwegian Yacht Club from 1949 to 1951, and became an honorary member in 1977. He was also a board member of the Scandinavian Sailing Federation.

He finished his secondary education in 1922. He studied at the business school in Neuchâtel until 1924, then studied economy at Ecole libre des sciences politiques from 1924 to 1925. He worked as an accountant and salesman in Agence des Pays du Nord in Paris between 1924 and 1929, and then, while also studying chemistry in Brussels he was a director of Societé Belge du Titane from 1929 to 1935. In 1935 he returned to Norway as director of exports in Norsk Aluminium Co.

== Business executive ==
In 1937 he became director in Titan Co in Fredrikstad. From 1950 he was the chief executive, and also chairman of sister corporation in Europe until his retirement in 1969.

He chaired Fredrikstad commerce council from 1945 to 1956, and chaired local committees to administer bridge and railroad building. He was also vice consul for Belgium in Østfold county from 1949 to 1959. During the occupation of Norway by Nazi Germany he eventually fled to neutral Sweden, and worked in the industry office of the Norwegian legation in Stockholm from 1944 to 1945. He was decorated with the Defence Medal 1940–1945.

He chaired Studieselskapet for Norsk Industri (1948–1951), the Royal Norwegian Council for Scientific and Industrial Research (1968–1973, formerly board member 1950–1960) and Norsk Hydro (1970–1974, board member since 1968). He was deputy chair of Store Norske Spitsbergen Kulkompani (1945–1954), board member of Federation of Norwegian Industries (1956–1964) and the Norwegian International Chamber of Commerce branch.

He was decorated as a Knight, First Class of the Order of St. Olav (1960), Knight of the Order of Leopold II and Officer of the Belgian Order of the Crown. In 1973 he was promoted to Commander of the Order of St. Olav. He died in 1994.

Business positions
Preceded by Rolf Østbye	Chair of Norsk Hydro; 1970–1974	Succeeded by Preben Munthe
