= Nils Otto Tank =

Norwegian missionary

Nils Otto Tank (March 11, 1800 – May 4, 1864) was a Norwegian born, Moravian Church missionary and teacher. He was a pioneer settler in Wisconsin.

== Background ==
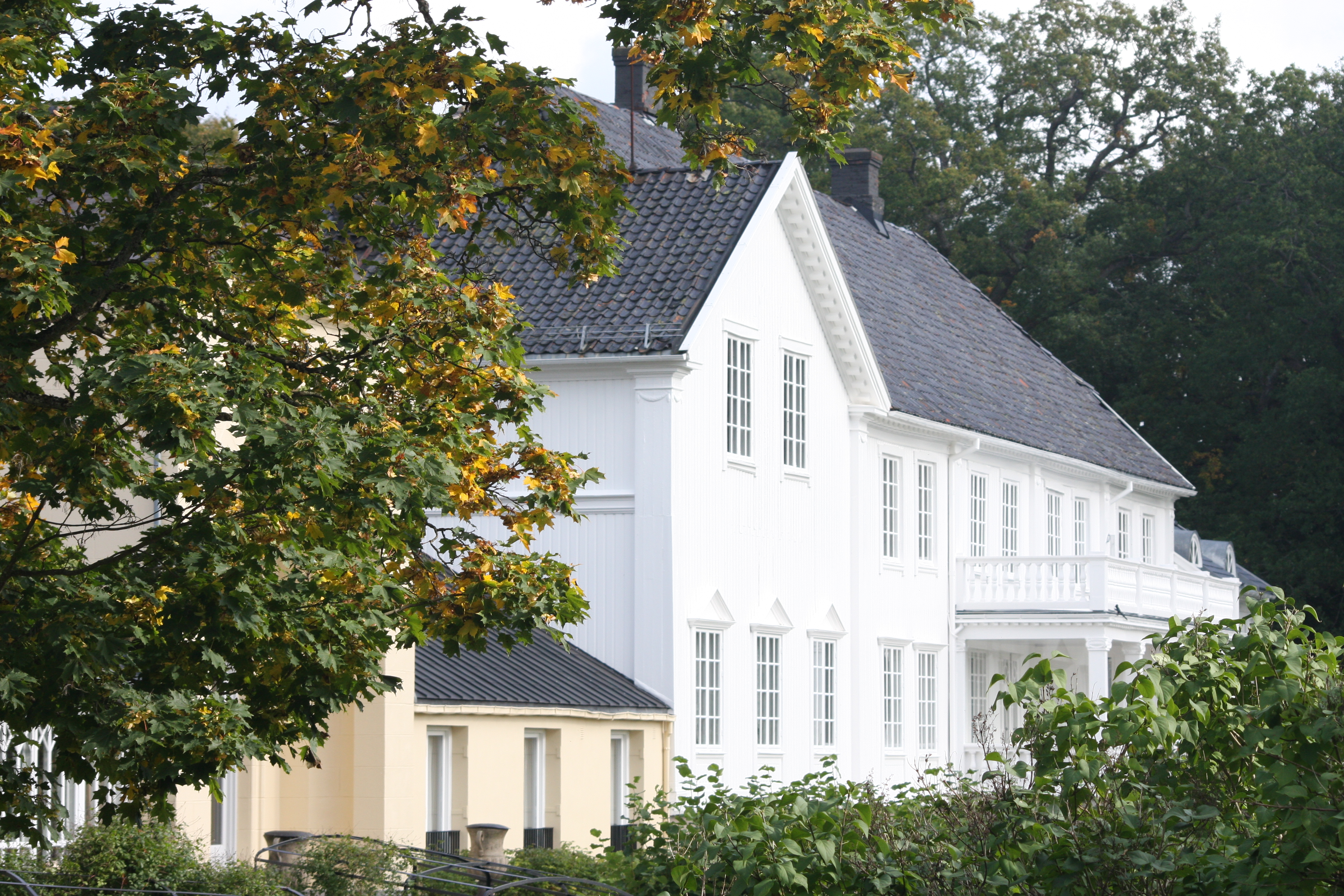
Rød Herregård in Halden

Nils Otto Tank was born near Halden in Østfold, Norway. He was the son of a wealthy politician and landowner. His father Carsten Tank (1766–1832) had been Minister of Finance on the governing council in Norway in 1814. His mother, Cathrine von Cappelen Tank (1772–1837) was the daughter of Diderich von Cappelen, a wealthy land-owner and ship owner. The manor house at the family estate, Rød Herregård, is now open to the public and operated by Østfold Museum (Østfold museene)

Tank was educated in various European universities. In 1813 Tank was sent to a school in Oslo and in 1818 to a Moravian School in England. In 1834, he moved to Christiansfeld, Denmark to live at the Moravian Church colony which dated from 1773.

== Personal life ==
His first wife, Marianne Dorothea Frueauf (1804–1844) was born in Grosshennersdorf near Herrnhut in Saxony. Otto Tank and Marianne Frueauf were married in Herrnhut during 1838. Their daughter Marianna Fredericka was born in Suriname in 1843 and her mother died the following year. In 1849, Otto Tank married Caroline Louise Albertina van der Meulen (1803–1891) who had been born in Amsterdam, Netherlands.

== Missionary ==
Tank was disinherited after his first marriage and his conversion to the Moravian faith.

== Immigration ==
In 1850 the family migrated to the United States. Tank became acquainted with a Norwegian Moravian minister, Andreas Iverson. Tank purchased a tract of nearly 1,000 acres on the west bank of the Fox River at Fort Howard.

Tank also acquired a fur trader’s cabin and rebuilt it as the historic Tank Cottage. He planned to establish a communal society. However Tank refused to grant title to land or adhere to the governing body of the Moravian Church. Personal differences soon arose between Tank and Reverend Iverson over leadership and the religious community elected to settle at Ephraim, Wisconsin. Tank also planned a canal between Green Bay and Prairie du Chien, this was before the railroad became preferred transportation.

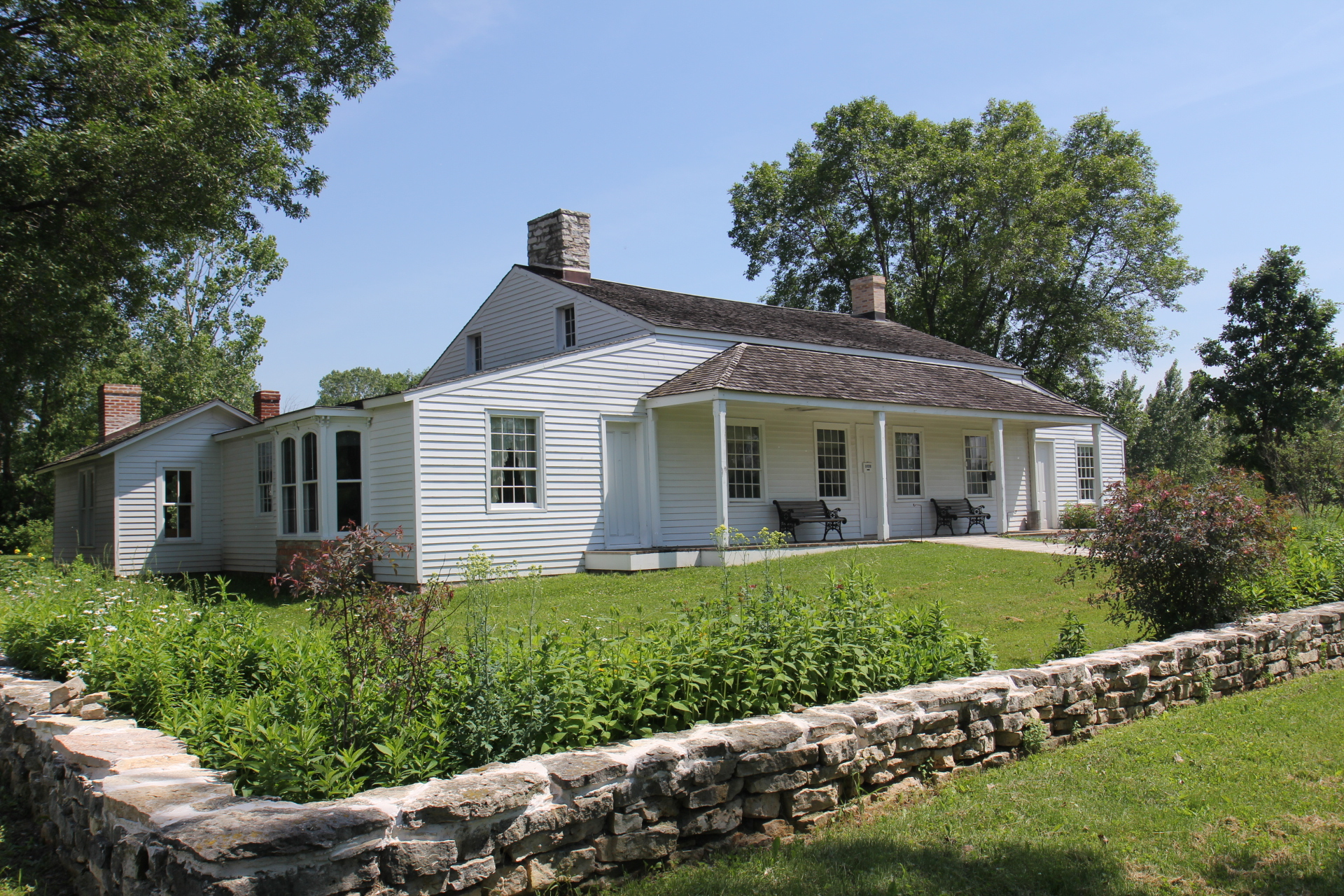
Tank Cottage in Green Bay

== Tank Cottage ==
Tank Cottage was located on the west bank of the Fox River. It is reported to be the oldest existing house in Wisconsin.

In 1975 the cottage was moved by barge to Heritage Hill State Historical Park in Green Bay. The building is listed on the National Register of Historic Places (added 1970 - Building - #70000028).

== Tank House ==
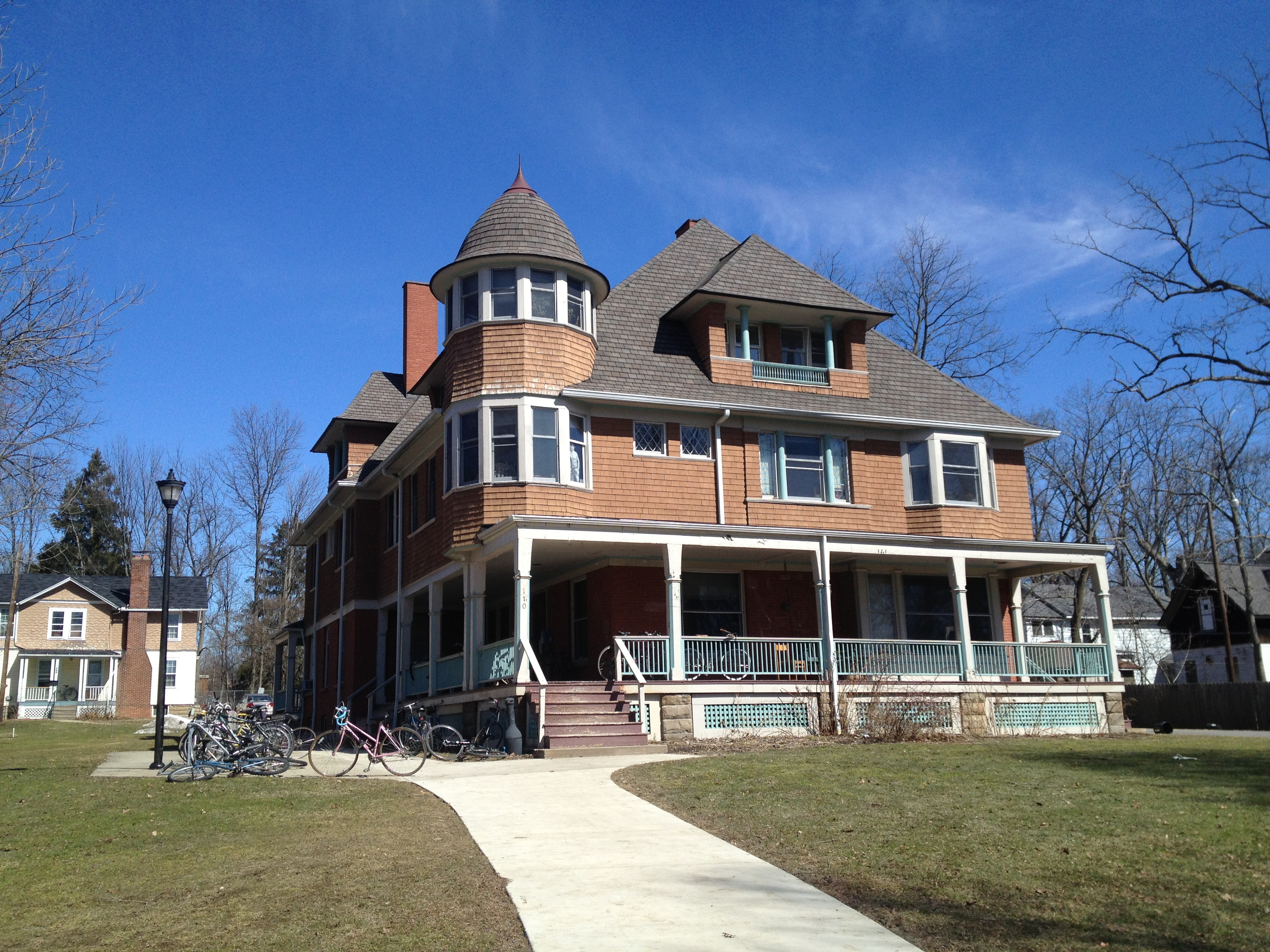
Tank House in Oberlin

After the death of Nils Otto Tank in 1864, his widow Caroline Louise Albertina Tank remained in Wisconsin until her death in 1891.

She also donated land to build the Clara Tank Home for Missionary Children in Oberlin, Ohio. Now known as Tank House, the building serves as a residential co-operative for students at Oberlin College.
