= Nils Anker =

Norwegian politician

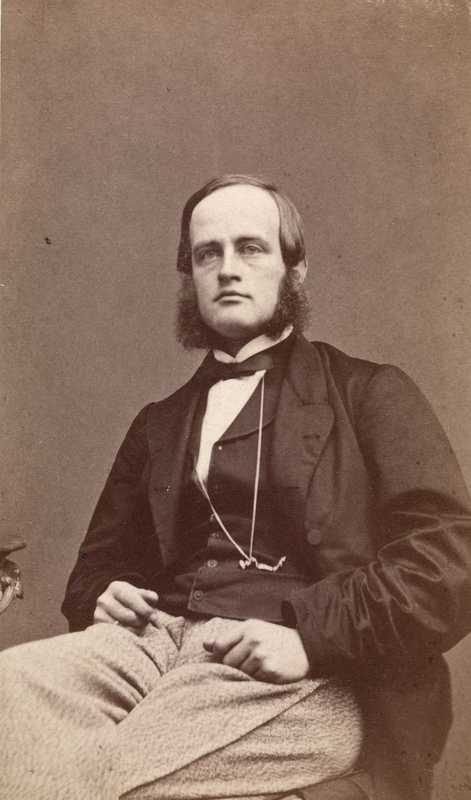
- Nils Anker
- Born: 1836
- Died: 1893 (aged 56–57)
- Occupation: businessman

Nils Anker (14 June 1836 – 1 October 1893 ) was a Norwegian businessman, landowner and politician.

He was born at Rød herregård in Halden, Østfold, Norway. He was a son of Peter Martin Anker and his second wife, Cathrine Olava Nicoline Gløersen (1814-1902). He was a brother of Herman Anker and Christian August Anker, uncle of Katti Anker Møller, Ella Anker and Johan Anker and granduncle of Øyvind Anker, Peter Martin Anker and Tove Mohr.

He made his living as a wholesaler and landowner. He was elected to the Parliament of Norway in 1885, 1888 and 1891. He represented the constituency Fredrikshald and the Conservative Party.
