= Nini Roll Anker =

Norwegian novelist and playwright

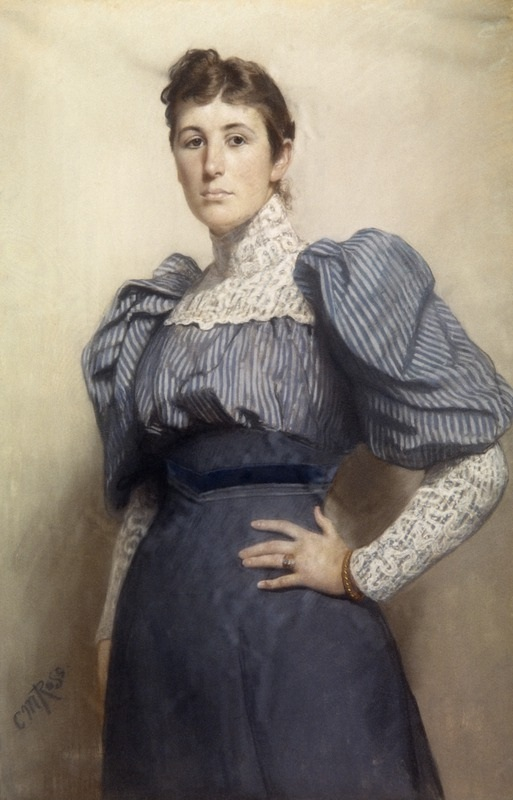
- Nini Roll Anker, portrayed by Christian Meyer Ross
- Born: 3 May 1873; Molde, Norway
- Died: 20 May 1942 (aged 69); Asker
- Occupations: novelist and playwright
- Notable work: Den som henger i en tråd
- Spouse: Johan Anker
- Parent: Ferdinand Nicolai Roll
- Relatives: Nils Anker (father-in-law)

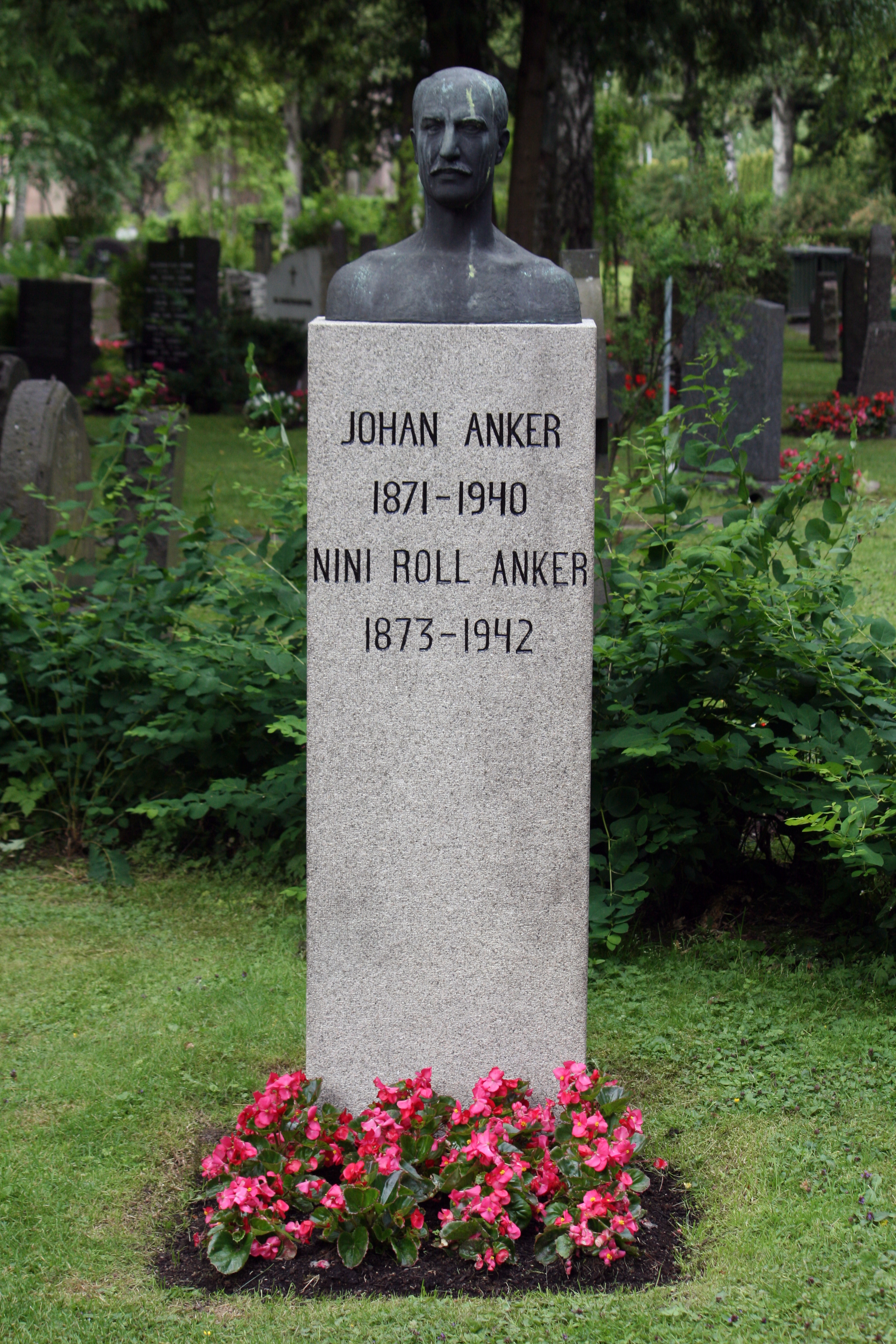
Memorial of Johan Anker and Nini Roll Anker at Vestre gravlund in Oslo

Nini Roll Anker (3 May 1873 – 20 May 1942) was a Norwegian novelist and playwright. Her books often concerned the lives of women within different social classes as well as the women's rights movement and the rights of the working class.

== Personal life ==
Nicoline Magdalene Roll was born at Molde in Møre og Romsdal, Norway. She was the daughter of stipendiary magistrate and later member of parliament and minister Ferdinand Nicolai Roll. The family moved to Kristiania (now Oslo) and for a period of time resided in Stockholm while her father served as the Minister of Justice and Supreme Court Attorney.

She was married twice, first in 1892 to land owner Peter Martin Anker (1863–1939), a son of politician Nils Anker. After a divorce in 1907, she married his cousin, engineer and sailor Johan August Anker in 1910. The couple settled at Lillehaugen in Asker Municipality.

== Career ==
She made her literary debut with the novel I blinde in 1898, using the pseudonym Jo Nein. In total, she wrote 18 novels, three novel collections and four plays. Among her later novels are Det svake kjøn (1915) and Den som henger i en tråd (1935). The biographical Min venn Sigrid Undset ("My friend Sigrid Undset") and the diary novel Kvinnen og den svarte fuglen were published posthumously. In Den som henger i en tråd ("Those Hanging by a Thread"), the protagonist "Karen Anna" (or "Karna" for short) works as a seamstress in a clothing factory. The novel portrays a group of unmarried women and their challenges in the society, and treats various topics of women's rights and workers' rights, including reproductive rights, aspects of religion and social issues. The novel was adapted for television and staged at Fjernsynsteatret in 1980.

She died at Asker in May 1942. Nini Roll Anker and Johan Anker were both buried at Vestre gravlund in Oslo.

== Selected works ==
- Lill-Anna og de andre (1906)
- Benedicte Stendal (1909)
- De vaabenløse (1912)
- Fru Castrups datter (1918)
- Kirken – skuespill (1920)
- Huset i Søgaten (1923)
- Komedien. Skuespil i tre akter (1923)
- Kvindesind (1924)
- Det svake kjønn (1924)
- I amtmandsgaarden (1925)
- Piken. Skuespil i tre akter (1925)
- Under skraataket (1927)
- Prisopgaven (1928)
- Enken (1932)
- Elling Torsens hjem (1934)
- På ærens mark. Skuespill i tre akter (1934)
- Den som henger i en tråd (1935)
- På egen grunn (1936)
- Små avsløringer (1937)
- Bak Munkeruds fasade (1938)
- Kvinnen og den svarte fuglen (1945)
- Min venn Sigrid Undset (1946)
