= Den som henger i en tråd =

Book by Nini Roll Anker

Den som henger i en tråd (Those Hanging by a Thread) is a 1935 novel by the Norwegian new realist author Nini Roll Anker. The book portrays a women's working atmosphere in a group of seamstresses at a clothing factory and the poor conditions they worked under. The book discusses topics such as abortion, religion, and the position of women. The book is one of the most important contributions to Norwegian women's literature.

The novel was adapted for television in 1980 based on a screenplay by Åse Vikene and was broadcast as a series by the Norwegian Broadcasting Corporation. Eli Skolmen Ryg directed the film, and it featured Katja Medbøe, Anne Marit Jacobsen, and Minken Fosheim.
