= Annette Abigael Hamilton =

Norwegian fairy-tale collector, author, and actress from the 19th century

Annette Abigael Hamilton (1806–1879) born Palm was a Norwegian fairy-tale collector and author. She was born in Fredrikshald (Halden) and was the daughter of captain Hans Christian Palm and Anne Samuelsen. She married captain Wilhelm Hamilton who also was a publisher. She was also an actress at the dramatic society of Halden.

Hamilton was an eager participant in the dramatic society in Fredrikshald (Halden) and in 1847 her fairy tale collection was published by her husband's publishing company. The book was published in 1847 at a time when the dramatic society was active. As a fairy-tale author she is counted as one of the Norwegian pioneers of this literary genre. Her pen name was Abigail and a pseudonym for A. A. Hamilton.

The fairy-tale collection was called Abigaels Eventyr og Sagn. Gave for Børn (Abigaels Fairy Tales and Legends. Gift for Children.). It is one of the first fairy-tale collections in Norway. The book was sold by J. W. Cappelen. Several of the fairy-tales are Norwegian folk tales and the tale on page 34 is classified as AA-TH types 1525R-1653B. The tale on page 24-29 is classified as AA-TH type 513 which in English is called The Land and Water Ship. The collection is built on models found outside Norway at the time. Some of the tales are strongly edited and some are her literary creations. Numbers 1, 3, 4, 5 and 6 are fairy-tales, 7 is loose motifs from legends and folk tales and nr 8-12 are supposed to be her literary creations.

== Bibliography ==
- Abigaels Eventyr og Sagn. Gave for Børn. Frederikshald, Hamilton, 1847.
