= Johan Anker =

Norwegian sailor (1871–1940)

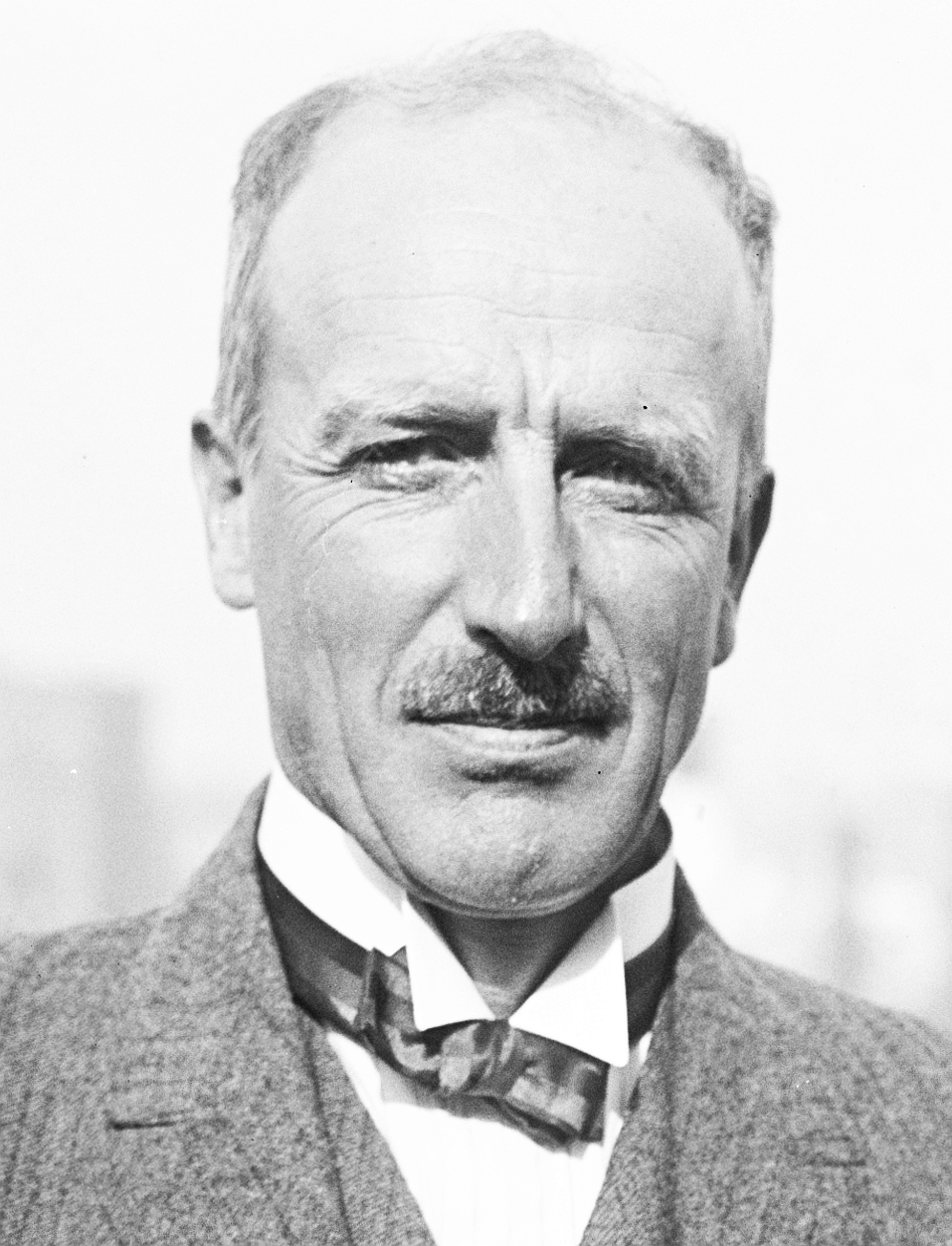

Personal information
- Full name: Johan August Anker
- Nationality: Norwegian
- Born: 28 June 1871 Berg, Østfold
- Died: 2 October 1940 (aged 69) Halden, Østfold

Sailing career
- Sport: Sailing
Medal record
Sailing
Representing Norway
Olympic Games
Gold medal – first place	1912 Stockholm	12 Metre
Gold medal – first place	1928 Amsterdam	6 Metre
- Updated on 9 May 2015

Johan August Anker (26 June 1871 – 2 October 1940) was a Norwegian sailor and yacht designer who competed in the 1908 Summer Olympics, in the 1912 Summer Olympics, and in the 1928 Summer Olympics.

== Personal life ==
He was born at Refne in Berg, Østfold as a son of wholesaler Christian August Anker (1840–1912) and Christine Charlotte Friis (1848–1899). He was a grandson of landowner and politician Peter Martin Anker, and nephew of landowner and politician Nils Anker and school founder Herman Anker.

In March 1895, he married Julie Frederikke Jacobsen (1872–1962). Their son Christian August Anker, born 1896, was a businessman, and their son Erik Anker, born 1903, also became a sailor and businessman. The marriage was later dissolved. In January 1910 he married his second wife, renowned feminist Nini Roll Anker (1873–1942). She had formerly been married to Johan's first cousin.

== Sailing career ==
In 1908, he finished fourth as a crew member of the Norwegian boat Fram in the 8 metre class competition.

Four years later, he was a crew member of the Norwegian boat Magda IX, which won the gold medal in the 12 metre class. He returned to the Olympics in 1928 to win his second gold medal, this time in the 6 metre class. He did so as a crew member of Norna. This time his son was on the crew, so was Crown Prince Olav of Norway. They represented the Royal Norwegian Yacht Club. Anker chaired the Royal Norwegian Yacht Club from 1916 to 1919 and 1921 to 1925, and was a co-founder and first chairman of the Nordic Sailing Federation from 1915.

== Yacht designer ==
In 1905, he bought into a small boatbuilding yard named Jensens Yard. It became the famous Anker & Jensen Yard. Most of the boat design was done by Anker, and most of the boat building was done by Jensen.

Johan Anker became an internationally recognized yacht designer after entering the 1908 Olympics, held that year in Great Britain. The sailing took place in the Solent, and Johan Anker raced his 8mR Fram. He took 4th place in the regatta. A few years later, Anker returned to the Solent for the 1911 Coronation Regatta, this time with the yacht Rollo, a 12mR design. This time, Johan Anker sailed home to Norway with the gold medal. With the International Rule yachts quickly increasing in popularity on the international yacht racing scene, John Anker had established himself as a first class designer. With the long and sleek boats that Anker designed he soon became known as the “master of lines."

In addition to designing several International Metre Rule yachts, Anker designed the Dragon in 1929. The Dragon later became an Olympic class and is raced in more than 26 countries across five continents.

In 1915, Johan Anker parted with Jensen, and the yard was taken over entirely by Anker, who kept the name Anker & Jensen for the business.

Anker's 6mR, 8mR, 12mR designs excelled, but he also designed 15mRs Isabel-Alexandra (1913) and Neptune (1917), Q-Class Cotton Blossom II (1925), Figaro IV, Brand II and Noreine.

Anker died in October 1940, aged 69, and was buried at Oslo Western Civil Cemetery.
