= Tank Cottage =

Oldest building in Wisconsin

- U.S. National Register of Historic Places
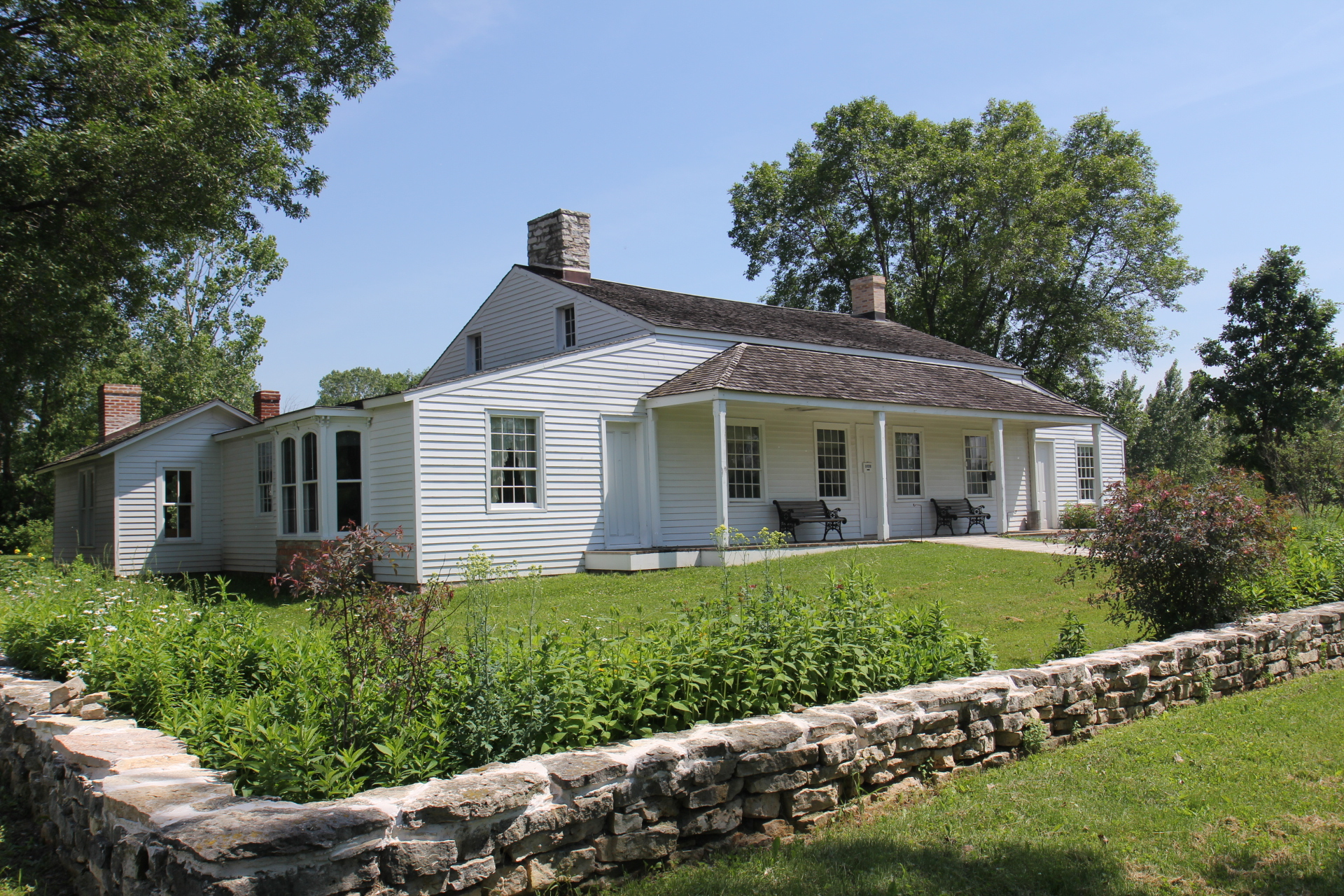
- Tank Cottage
- Location: 2640 South Webster Ave. Green Bay, Wisconsin
- Coordinates: 44.47555°N 88.03591°W
- Built: Between 1776-1803
- NRHP reference No.: 70000028
- Added to NRHP: April 28, 1970

Tank Cottage is located within Heritage Hill State Historical Park in Green Bay, Wisconsin. It was added to the National Register of Historic Places in 1970 and may be the oldest building in Wisconsin. (Note: The St. Joan of Arc Chapel on the Marquette University campus in Milwaukee is technically older, having been built in the 15th century. The chapel was built in France, shipped to the United States in 1927, and reconstructed at Marquette University in 1966. The Tank Cottage is the oldest Wisconsin building that was originally built in Wisconsin.)

== History ==
French-Canadian fur trader Joseph Roi built the cottage on the Fox River sometime between 1776 and 1803. He used the pièce-sur-pièce à coulisse technique common in French-Canadian buildings of the time. In 1805, Roi sold the cottage to Jacques Porlier, an ally of the British. During the War of 1812, the building served as a local headquarters for the British. After the war, Porlier swore allegiance to the United States and in 1820 became chief justice of the Brown County court of the Michigan Territory.

In 1850, Norwegian Moravian missionary Nils Otto Tank purchased the cottage and large tract of land along the Fox River. His wife, Caroline van der Meulin, covered the pièce-sur-pièce à coulisse work with clapboard and lived there until her death in 1891. In 1908, the cottage was in danger of demolition as the city became more industrial, so it was moved from its original location on 8th Street along the river to Tank Park.

The building was added to the National Register of Historic Places in 1970, and in 1976 moved to its current location in Heritage Hill State Historical Park to serve as a museum.

== See also ==
- List of the oldest buildings in Wisconsin
