= Anglo-Norse Society in Oslo =

Organisation based in Oslo

The Anglo-Norse Society in Oslo (Norwegian: Norsk-Britisk Forening) is a society based in Oslo, Norway for advancing civil relations between Britain and Norway.

The Society was founded in 1921 on the initiative of Ella Anker, who as a newspaper correspondent in London had been a co-founder of the Anglo-Norse Society in London in 1918. The first president was Fridtjof Nansen.
