= Sagatun Folk High School =

Folk high school in Hamar, Norway

Coordinates: 60°48′01″N 11°04′04″E

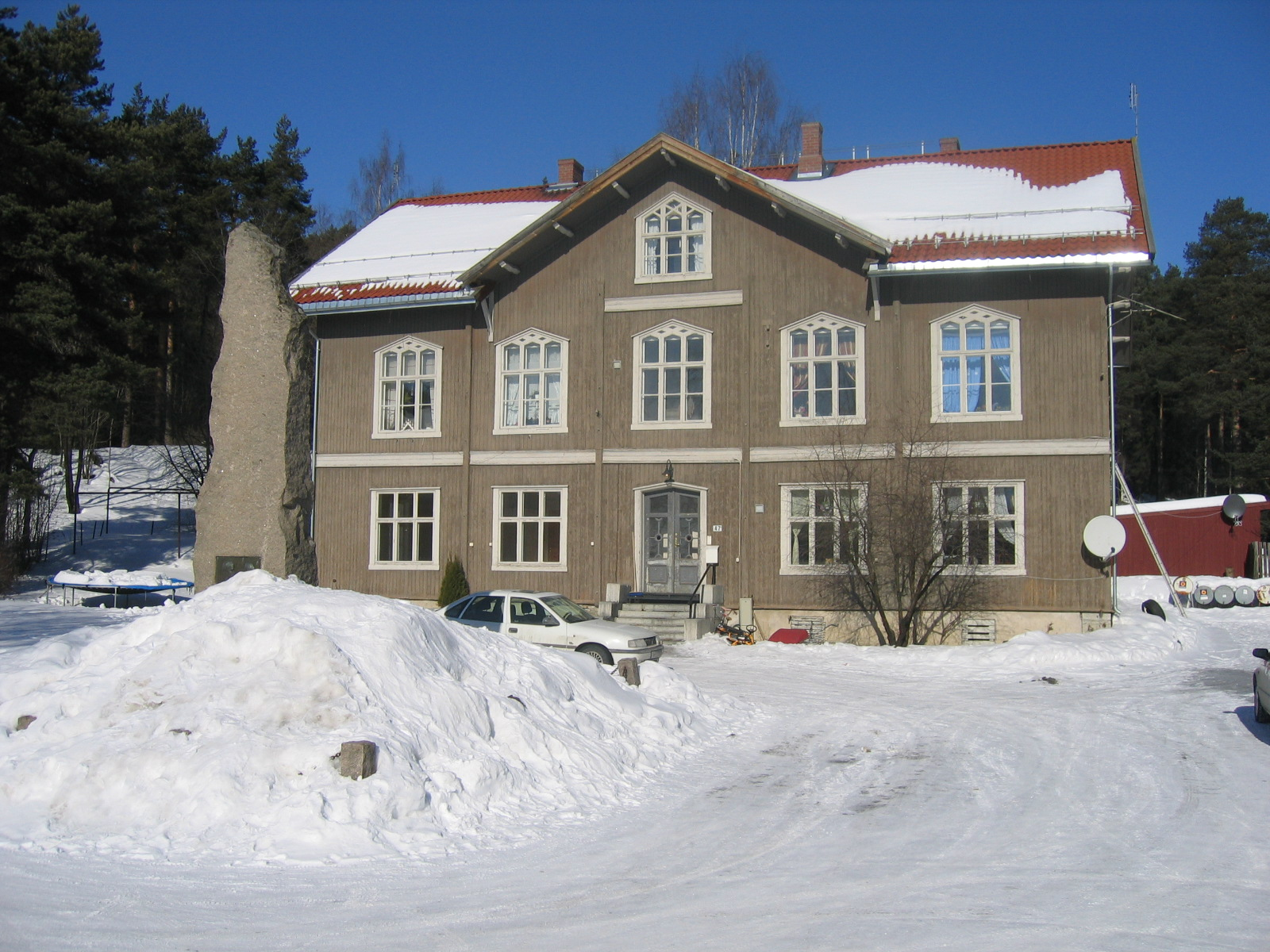
Sagatun during the winter.

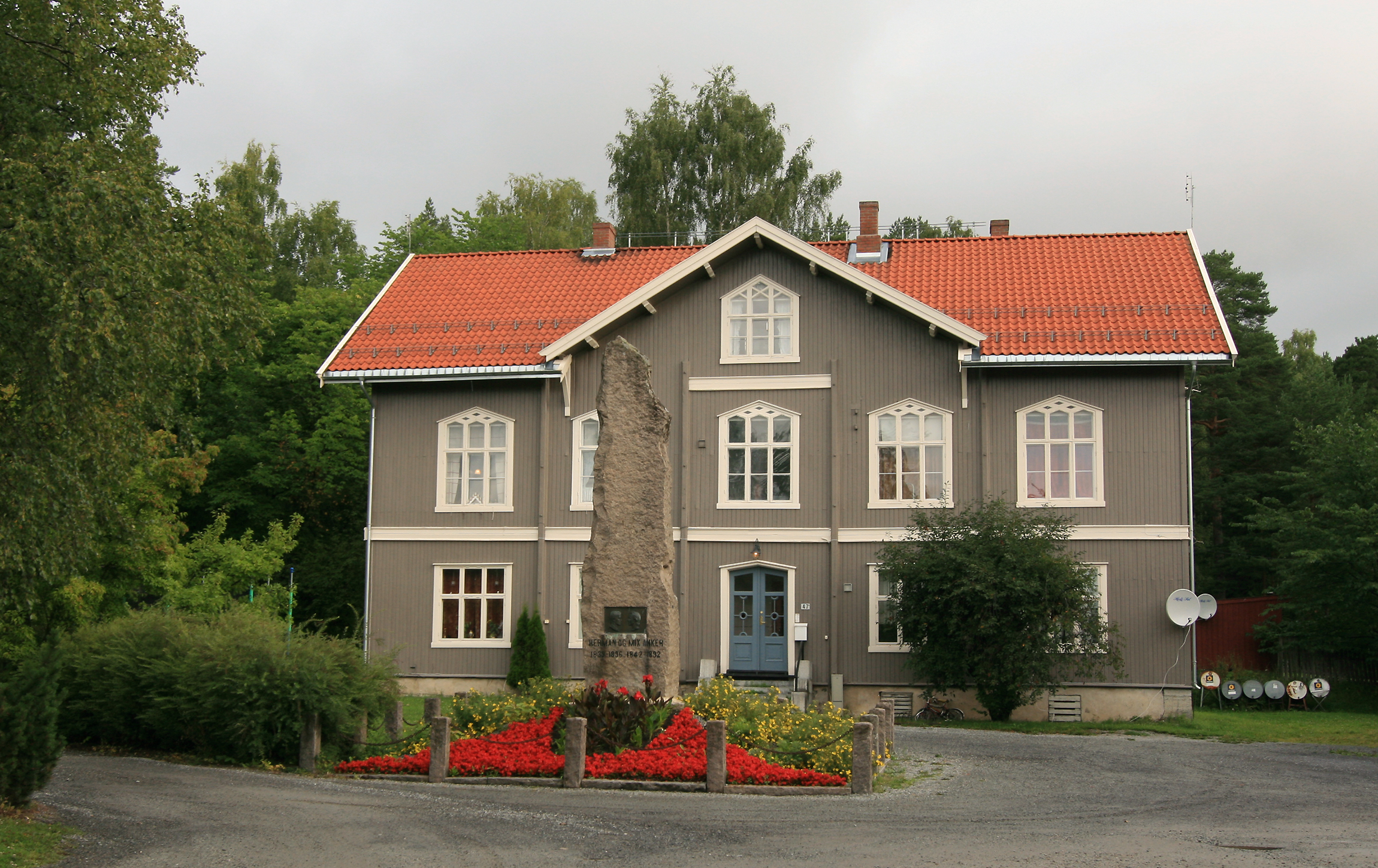
Sagatun during the summer.

Sagatun Folk High School (Norwegian: Sagatun folkehøyskole) was a folk high school in Hamar, Norway.

The first of its kind in Norway, it was founded by Herman Anker and Olaus Arvesen in 1864. The school building was erected around 1865, and drawn by architect Emil Victor Langlet. The school was disestablished in 1892, having been headed by Arvesen from 1873 to 1878 and 1880 to 1892.
