= Peter Martin Anker (politician) =

Norwegian politician

- Born: 1801; Halden in Østfold
- Died: 1863 (aged 61–62)
- Occupation: Politician

Peter Martin Anker (20 June 1801 – 24 February 1863) was a Norwegian landholder and politician.

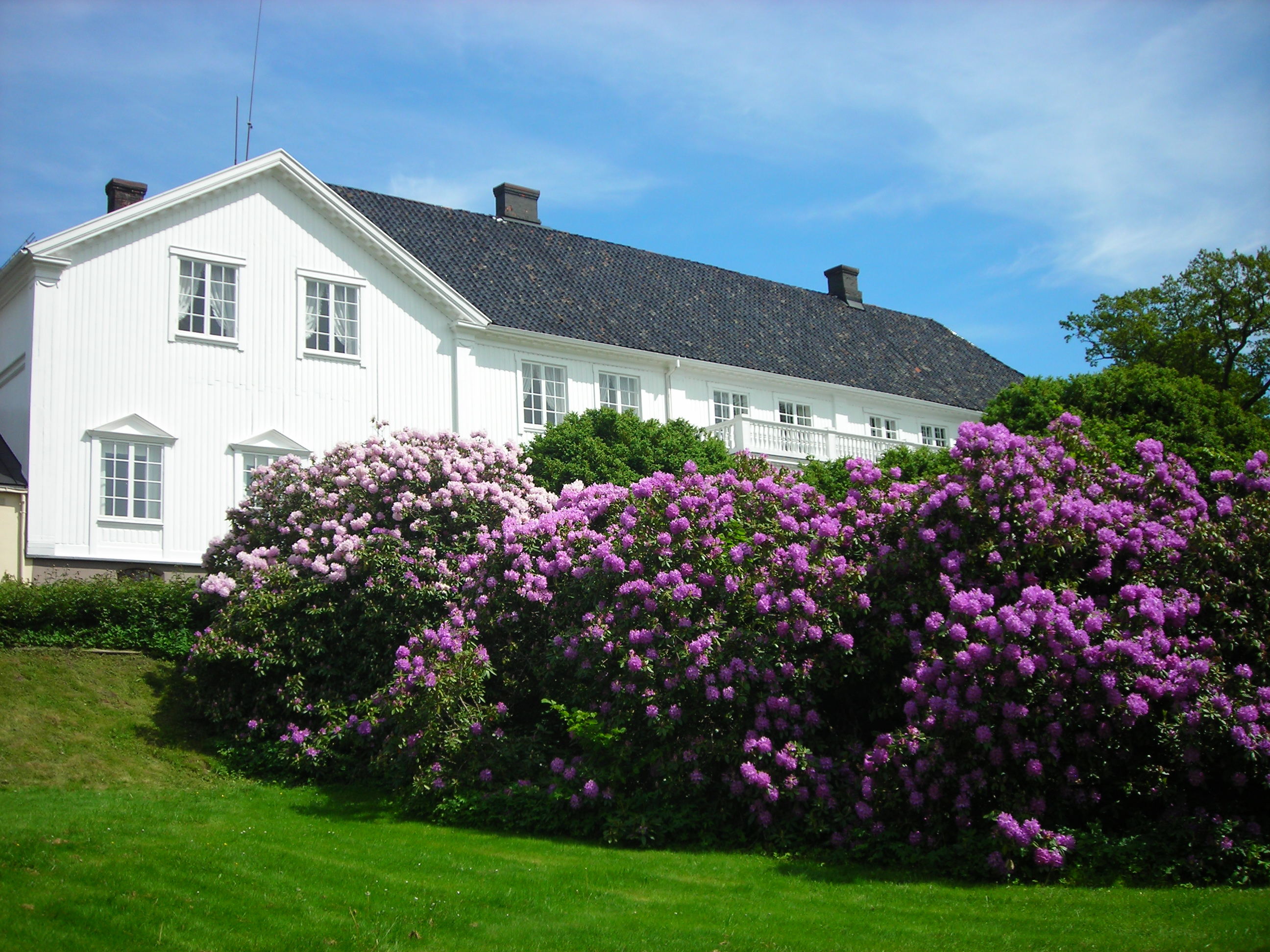
Rød Herregård in Halden

Anker was born at Halden in Østfold, Norway. He was a son of wholesaler Niels Anker (1764–1812). He was also a third cousin of Karen Anker, wife of Johan Caspar Herman Wedel-Jarlsberg. Together with Thrine Gløersen (1814–1902) he had the children Nils Anker, Herman Anker, Christian August Anker and Dikka Møller. Grandchildren include Katti Anker Møller, Ella Anker and Johan Anker and great-greandchildren include Øyvind Anker, Synnøve Anker Aurdal, Peter Martin Anker and Tove Mohr.

He served as first deputy to the Parliament of Norway during the term 1839–1841, representing the constituency Smaalenenes Amt (now Østfold).

Anker was a major landowner and held the manor house Rød herregård in Halden. Anker was married to Petronelle Didrikke Cathrine Tank (1806-1833) daughter of Carsten Tank. Following her death, he married Cathrine Olava Nicoline Gløersen (1814-1902).
