= SS Anglo-Norse =

A number of ships have been named Anglo-Norse, including:

- SS Anglo-Norse (1897)
- SS Anglo-Norse (1914)
