= Anglo-Norse Society in London =

Organization based in England

- Formation: 1918; 108 years ago
- Type: Registered charity
- Registration no.: 263933
- Headquarters: London, United Kingdom
- Chairperson: Marie Wells
- Vice Chairman: Paul Gobey
- Website: www.anglo-norse.org.uk

The Anglo-Norse Society in London is a society based in England for advancing the education of the citizens of Britain and Norway about each other's country and way of life.

The Society was founded in 1918 as a registered charity. The membership in London is both British and Norwegian. King Harald V of Norway was a patron, and previously held patronage jointly with Queen Elizabeth II of the United Kingdom until her death in 2022. The Norwegian ambassador to London is the honorary president.

There is a similar society based in Norway, Anglo-Norse Society in Oslo (Norsk-Britisk Forening), founded in 1921 by Norwegian journalist Ella Anker. Famed Norwegian explorer Fridtjof Nansen served as first president of the society.

The Anglo-Norse Society in London is a member of The Confederation of Scandinavian Societies of Great Britain and Ireland (COSCAN). Dating to 8 October 1950, COSCAN is a coordinating body for societies which works for cultural exchanges between UK and Ireland with the five nordic countries, Denmark, Finland, Iceland, Sweden and Norway.

In 2019, the Society presented its records to University College London.
