= Eli Skolmen Ryg =

Norwegian television producer (born 1936)

Eli Skolmen Ryg (born 27 May 1936) is a Norwegian television producer.

Her filmography include the Norwegian Broadcasting Corporation television series Den som henger i en tråd (1980), Enerom (1987), Fortuna (1993), Offshore (1996) and Soria Moria (2000). In 1990 she won the Amanda Committee's Golden Clapper. Eli Skolmen Ryg is related to several actors; she is the mother of Anne Ryg, former mother-in-law of Harald Eia, sister of Jon Skolmen and aunt of Christian and Tine Skolmen.
