= Tank House =

Tank Hall
- Tank House
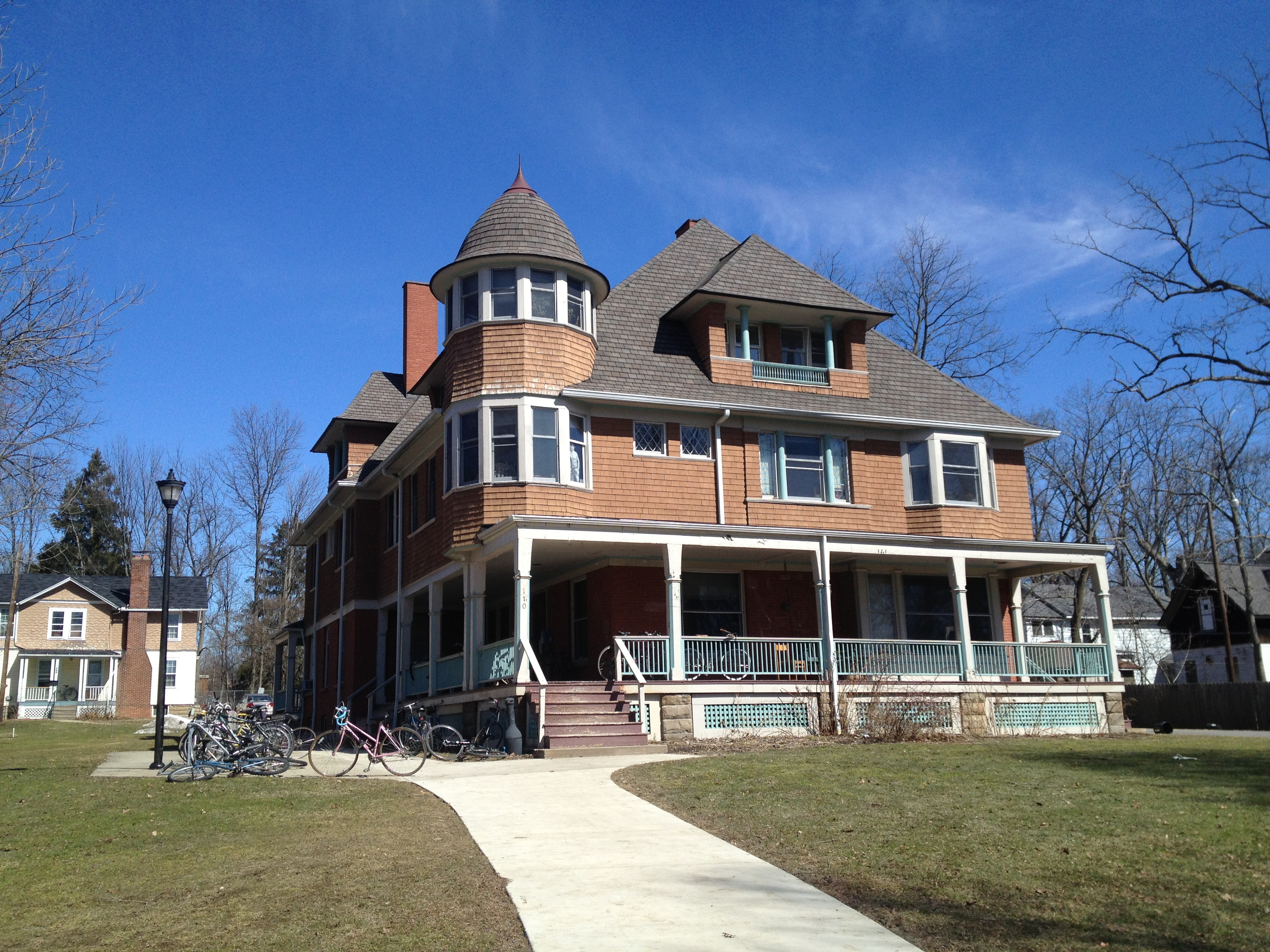
- Tank's facade in early 2014.

- Location within Ohio
- Former names: Tank Home for Missionary Children

General information
- Architectural style: Queen Anne
- Location: Oberlin, Ohio
- Coordinates: 41°17′45″N 82°13′3″W
- Owner: Oberlin College

Design and construction
- Architecture firm: F. A. Coburn, Cleveland

Tank Hall, also known as Tank House and Tank Cooperative, is an 1896 Queen Anne living and dining cooperative owned and maintained by Oberlin College in Oberlin, Ohio, United States. Originally the Tank Home for Missionary Children, the house underwent a series of renovations before becoming the co-op it is today. It currently operates as one of the Oberlin Student Co-operative's co-ops.

== History ==
The house was built by the Oberlin Missionary Home Association in 1896 to house the children of the missionaries abroad. It was designed by Cleveland architect F. A. Coburn. The firm of Glen and Copeland, from Oberlin, were the builders. The Home was named after Mrs. Caroline L. A. Tank, who contributed a quarter of the cost of its construction as a gift from the estate of her late husband Nils Otto Tank, who was a wealthy son of a Norwegian gentryman and worked as a missionary in Dutch Guiana in the 1840s; he also founded a Moravian religious commune in northern Wisconsin. In 1922, after the Association had ended, the College acquired the property for use as a women's dormitory. It became a residential co-operative in 1963.

== Architecture ==
The main building is rectangular, with many dormers, a tower, and bay windows breaking up the shape. On the front and part of the west side of the house is a recessed porch with spindle railing and square columns. A stairway leads up to the porch on the southwest corner of the building. The walls of the house are brick under the porch, but wood siding on the rest of the house. On the first story, many of the windows have sandstone sills. The house has a flat wooden stringcourse. On the second story is a central window facing the road surrounded by round fluted columns. There is a round tower on the second and third stories on the southwest corner of the house, topped by a bell-shaped roof. The top half-story of the house has many hipped dormers, some of which have small porches with roofs supported by round columns. The roof of the house and all the dormers is flared slightly at the bottom.

This building is set back from the road on a slight hill and has a large front yard. A sandstone path leads from the sidewalk to the front porch and to a large bike-rack on the west side of the house. There is a paved driveway on the east side of the house that leads to a small parking lot in the back. In front of the house is a massive ash tree.
