= Nordisk tidskrift för bok- och biblioteksväsen =

- Language: Swedish

Publication details
- History: 1914–2007

Standard abbreviations
- ISO 4: Nord. Tidskr. Bok- Bibl.

Indexing
- ISSN: 1652-909X

Nordisk tidskrift för bok- och biblioteksväsen was a Swedish bibliographical periodical. It was established in 1914 by Almqvist & Wiksell with Isak Collijn as its editor-in-chief. He was succeeded by Tönnes Kleberg in 1949, who was succeeded by Gert Hornwall in 1975. In 1990, Almqvist & Wiksell ceased publishing the periodical. It was then published by Avdelningen för bok- och bibliotekshistoria in 1991, by Lund University from 1992 to 1997 and by the Scandinavian University Press until 2000. It was revived by the five national libraries of the Nordic countries, which titled it Nordisk Tidskrift för Bok- och Bibliotekshistoria. The periodical was disestablished in 2007. In March 2005, Project Runeberg started digitalising the volumes from 1914 to 1935 of the periodical.
