= Peter Anker (art historian) =

Norwegian museum director and art historian

Peter Martin Anker (22 August 1927 – 22 December 2012) was a Norwegian museum director, art historian and critic.

== Personal life ==
He was born in Bergen as a son of chief physician Herman Anker (1901–1970) and Charlotte Amalie Meyer (1897–1985). He was married to Liv Løberg (1932–1986), but the marriage was dissolved. From October 1973 he was married to Inger Kiær, a daughter of Herman L. Løvenskiold, but that marriage was dissolved too. In April 1987 he married his third wife, Inger-Johanne Brautaset.

== Career ==
He finished his secondary education at Bergen Cathedral School in 1946. He enrolled at the Norwegian National Academy of Craft and Art Industry, and then in art history at the University of Oslo in 1948. He took the mag.art. degree (PhD equivalent) 1954 with a thesis about the frescos in Sant'Angelo in Formis. He worked for Landslaget Kunst i Skolen from 1954 to 1957, as a curator for the Norwegian Museum of Cultural History from 1958 to 1965 and director of Vestlandske Kunstindustrimuseum from 1965 to 1994. He was a lecturer at the University of Bergen from 1971.

Books include L'Art Scandinave (volume 1, 1969), Norsk middelalderkunst (1970, with István Rácz), Norsk folkekunst (1975, with István Rácz) and Folkekunst i Norge (1975). He participated in the editorial committee for the seven-volume work Norges kunsthistorie, released in 1983. He was also an art critic. He published his first criticism before finishing secondary school, and via the Academy of Craft and Art Industry newspaper Acantus he wrote in national outlets such as Kunsten i dag and Dagbladet. From 1961 to 1965 he worked part-time as an art critic in Arbeiderbladet.
