= Christian August Anker =

Norwegian industrialist (1840–1912)

Christian August Anker (9 August 1840 – 30 September 1912) was a Norwegian industrialist. He played an important role in the early mining industry in Norway and was also a pioneer in the wood-processing industry.

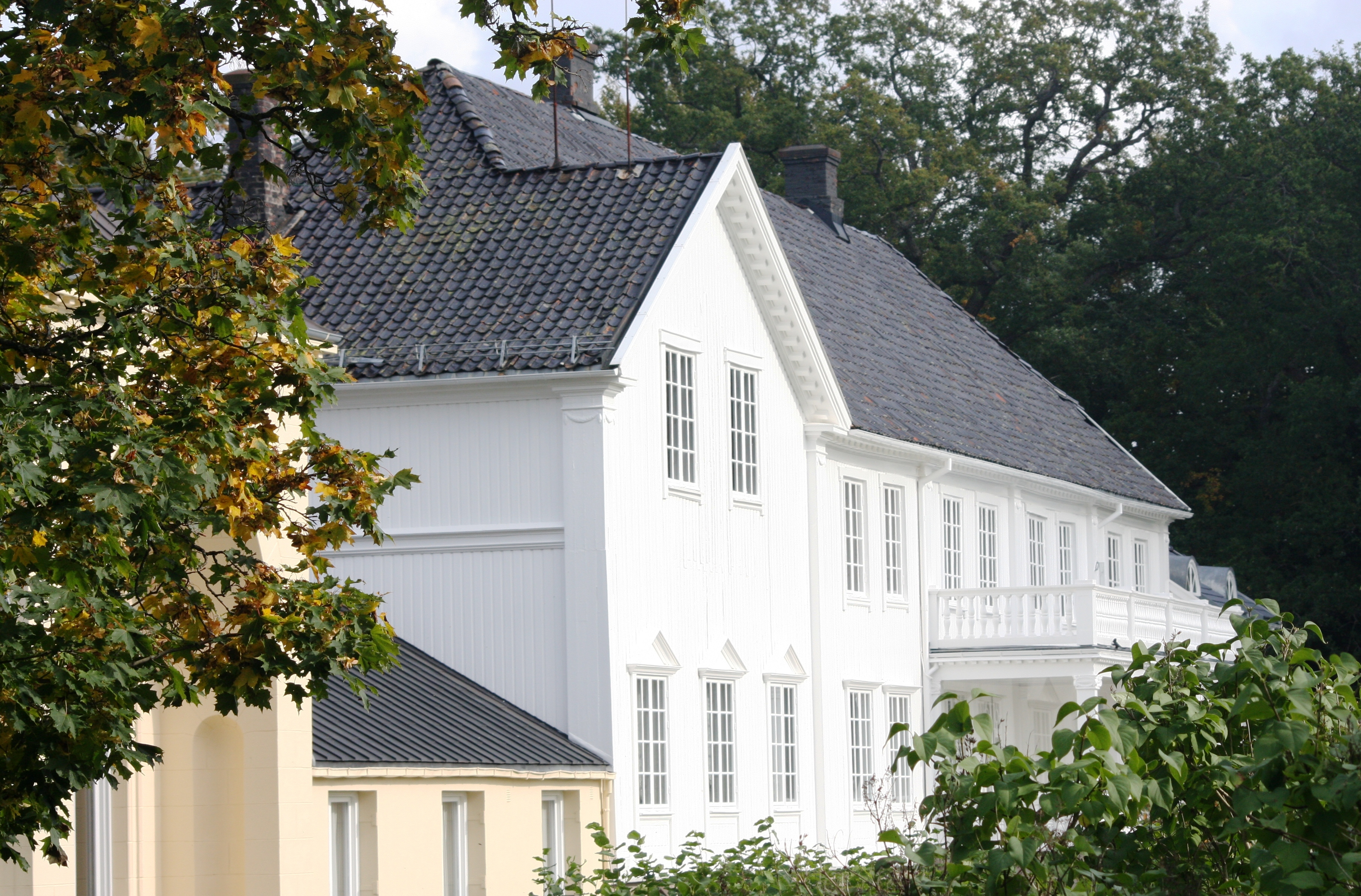
Rød Herregård

He was born in the town of Fredrikshald in Smaalenenes county, Norway. The son of wholesaler Peter Martin Anker, he was the brother of Nils Anker and Herman Anker. He was raised at the manor house Rød herregård in Halden and was educated in engineering at Hannover and Zurich.

Together with his brother Nils Anker, he created one of Norway's first pulp mill, Ankers Træsliberi & Papirfabrik at Fredrikshald in 1867. From 1873, he bought a number of properties at Hønefoss where a pulp mill became operational during 1881. He first became engaged in marble extraction at Fauske Municipality in 1884. From 1905, he became involved with the mining of iron ore deposits in Sør-Varanger Municipality.

== Personal life ==
He was married three times. In 1866, he married Annette Vilhelmine Krebs (1846–1867). In 1868, he was married to Christine Charlotte Friis (1848–1899). In 1900, he was married to Hansine Oleana Gundersen (1876–1958). He was the father of engineer and yacht designer, Johan Anker.
