= Herman Anker =

Norwegian school teacher and educationalist

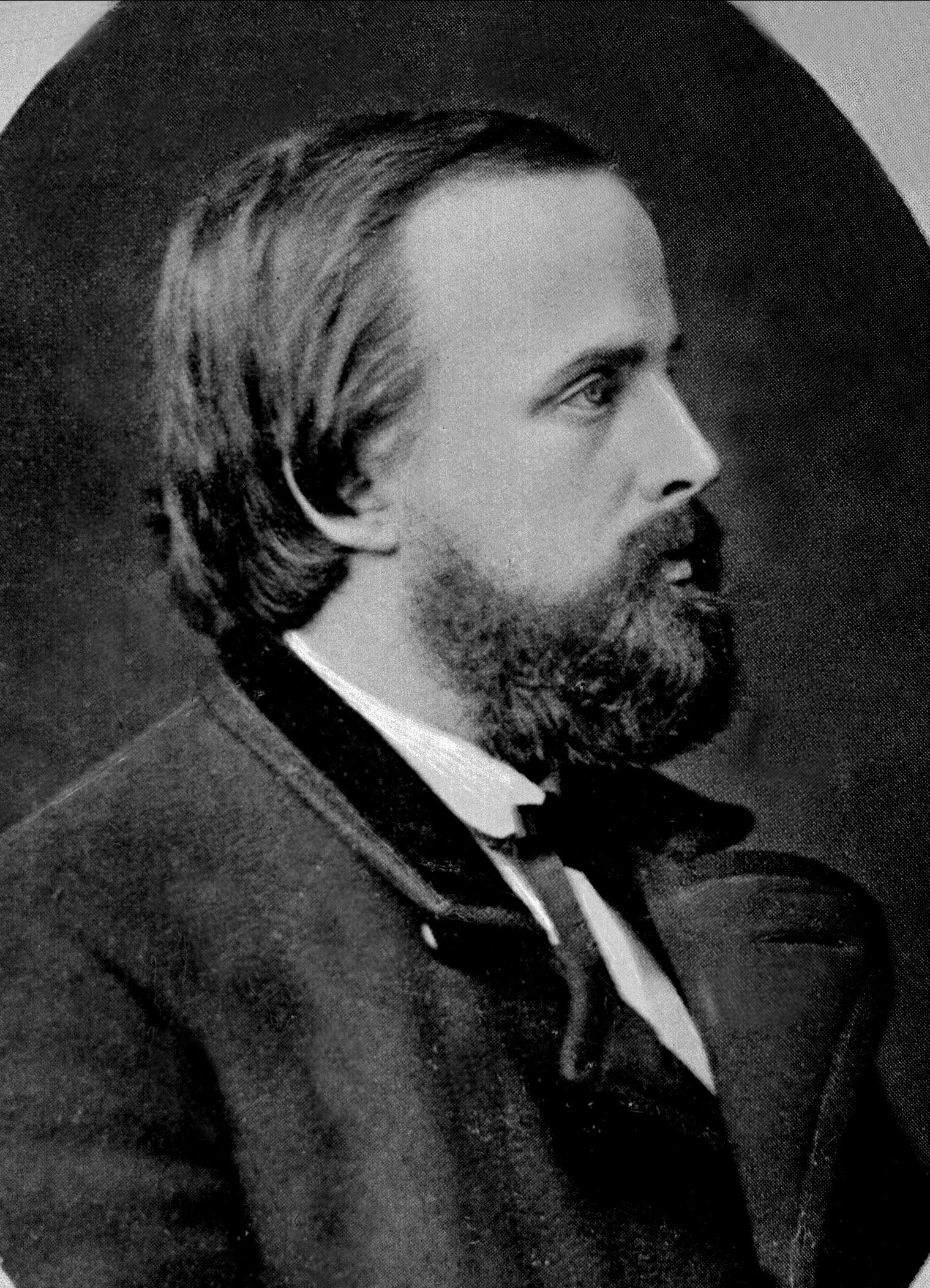
- Born: 15 July 1839; Halden
- Died: 9 August 1896 (aged 57)
- Occupations: School teacher and educationalist
- Children: Katti Anker Møller; Ella Anker
- Father: Peter Martin Anker
- Relatives: Christian August Anker (brother)

Herman Anker (15 July 1839 – 9 August 1896) was a Norwegian school teacher and educationalist.

He was born at Rød Manor in Halden, a son of wholesaler Peter Martin Anker. He was the brother of Christian August Anker, and father of Katti Anker Møller and Ella Anker. He went to the Latin School at Fredrikshald and took school graduation in 1857. He attended the University of Christiania earning his theological degree in 1863.

As a theological student in Copenhagen, he had met Grundtvig and became introduced to his thought on education and the development of the folk high school movement. In 1864 along with Olaus Arvesen, he founded Sagatun Folk High School at Hamar. This was the first folk high school in Norway.
