= Tank (disambiguation) =

A tank is an armoured combat vehicle.

Tank or tanking may also refer to:

== Geographical names ==
=== Oceania ===
- Tank Stream, New South Wales, Australia

=== Asia ===
- Tank (city), Khyber Pakhtunkhwa, Pakistan
  - Tank District, Khyber Pakhtunkhwa, Pakistan
  - Tank Tehsil, Khyber Pakhtunkhwa, Pakistan
- Tank Subdivision, Khyber Pakhtunkhwa, Pakistan
- Bandar-e Tang, also known as Tank, village in Iran

=== North America ===
- Tank Mountains, Arizona, United States
- Tank Pond (disambiguation)
- Tanks Peak, Colorado, United States

== People ==
- Tank (surname)

=== Stage name ===
- Tank (American singer), American R&B singer Durrell Babbs (born 1976)
- Tank (German singer), Eric Geisenheyner (born 1977)
- Tank (Taiwanese singer), singer/songwriter Lü Jianzhong (born 1982)
- Tank Palamara (born 1968), Italian rock guitarist Tancredi Palamara

=== Other people ===
- Tank (nickname)
- Tank Man, Chinese man arrested for standing in front of Chinese tanks
- Tank or Tanche (family), in Denmark and Norway

== Arts, entertainment, and media ==
=== Fictional entities ===
- Tank (Gobots), a character from the Gobots toy line
- Tank (The Matrix), a minor character from The Matrix
- Michael "Tank" Ellis, a character in the Canadian-American television series Captain Power and the Soldiers of the Future
- Tank, the title character of the comic strip Tank McNamara
- "The Tank", a character from the Left 4 Dead video game series
- Tank, the main character from the children's TV series Pupstruction
- Tank, a character (Rainbow Dash's pet tortoise) from the children's show My Little Pony: Friendship Is Magic

=== Music ===
==== Groups ====
- Tank (band), British heavy metal band

==== Albums ====
- Tank (album), by Asian Dub Foundation
- Kreidler Tank, by Kreidler

==== Songs ====
- "Tank", an instrumental by Emerson, Lake & Palmer on their 1970 eponymous album
- "Tank!", the opening song for the anime series Cowboy Bebop
- "Tank", a song by South Korean girl group NMIXX from their 2022 single album Ad Mare
- "Tank", a song by The Stranglers from Black and White

=== Video games ===
- Tank (video games), a video game term for a character that attracts enemies and their attacks as a way to protect other characters
- Tank (video game), a 1974 arcade game by Kee Games
- Tank! Tank! Tank!, a video game
- TNK III (1984 video game), a video game that was released in Japan as "T.A.N.K."

=== Other arts, entertainment, and media ===
- Tank! (wargame), a 1974 board wargame featuring tank-on-tank combat in the 20th-century
- Tank (film), a 1984 movie starring James Garner
- Tank (magazine), a British quarterly
- The Tank (theater), performance space in Manhattan, New York

== Brands and enterprises ==
- Cartier Tank, a watch line by Cartier
- Film Tank, a film production company in the UK
- TANK (marque), a Chinese automotive marque, specialises in SUVs

== Organizations ==
- Think tank, an organization that performs research and advocacy
- Transit Authority of Northern Kentucky, a public transit company in Northern Kentucky

== Storage vessels ==
- Tank, another word for a gas cylinder
- Flexible tanks
- Fuel tank, also called a "gas tank" or "petrol tank"
- Irrigation tank, a man-made water reservoir in India and South Asia, part of a tank cascade system
- Septic tank, a container for waste water
- Storage tank, a container, usually for liquids
- Water tank, a container for storing liquid
- Pond, specifically artificial ponds created by directing water runoff

== Other uses ==
- TANK (gene)
- Tank (goddess), in ancient North Africa
- Tank (unit), an obsolete unit of measure in India
- LC circuit, also called a tank circuit
- Mitzvah tank, a large vehicle used as a portable educational and outreach center and mini-synagogue
- Tank Cottage, Green Bay, Wisconsin, on the US National Register of Historic Places
- Tank Upper Secondary School, a secondary school in Bergen, Norway
- Tank car, a railroad car
- Tanking (sports), a strategy of sports teams intentionally fielding losing teams in order to gain benefits that pay off later
- Aerial refueling, sometimes known as buddy tanking
- Tanking, a method of wet rendering; see Rendering (animal products)

== See also ==
- Tank top (disambiguation)
- Tanker (disambiguation)
- Taank Kingdom, an ancient kingdom of the Punjab
