= Richard Scarry's Busytown =

1993 educational video game and its 1999 remake

- 1993 cover art
- Developers: Novotrade; Pearson Software (1999)
- Publishers: Paramount Interactive; Sega of America (Sega Genesis); Simon & Schuster (remake)
- Producer: Cindy Claveran
- Designers: András Csaszar; Zoltan Csaszar
- Programmers: Balázs Makó; Zoltán Toth
- Artists: Károly Gögös; Tamás Csige
- Composer: András Magyari
- Platforms: MS-DOS, Sega Genesis, Windows, Classic Mac OS
- Release: MS-DOS: NA: 1993; Mac: NA: 1993; Genesis: NA: 1994; Windows, Mac: NA: 1999
- Genre: Edutainment
- Mode: Single-player

Richard Scarry's Busytown is a 1993 educational video game developed by Novotrade for preschool children. It was released for MS-DOS, Classic Mac OS, and Sega Genesis. This game was based on the Best...Ever! series of VHSes distributed by Random House's home video division, which preceded the TV series's The Busy World of Richard Scarry that was produced by CINAR and Paramount Television.

A remake was published in 1999 by Pearson Software for Windows and Classic Mac OS (System 7.5.1 and later), with the visuals and animation updated to resemble that of The Busy World of Richard Scarry, and the dialogue re-recorded with Boston actors.

== Gameplay ==
The game consists of an interactive storybook that was written by Richard Scarry. Most of the game is spent discovering Busytown looking for things to interact with using either the game pad or a special mouse that could be purchased separately from the game and the console system.

Young gamers will do everything from building a house using construction tools to delivering something to repair a ship. Games are relatively short and can be finished in about an hour. Familiar faces from Richard Scarry's works of literature include Huckle Cat and Lowly Worm. Another game allows players to control the wind in order to cause controlled havoc at the Busytown park and beach. Other games located throughout Busytown include helping finish Mr. Fix-it's latest invention, helping a patient at Dr. Diane's hospital, delivering goods throughout Busytown, helping Smokey the Firefighter prepare a fire engine for extinguishing a house fire, working at a gas station, filling orders at an automated deli, learning basic addition/subtraction on a see-saw, and helping Bananas Gorilla get his box of bananas out of a park full of tourists. All games offer basic vocabulary practice as simple puzzles help improve basic problem solving and English language skills.

The voice quality of this game is realistic when compared to the cartoons of that era. All of the characters act and talk like their counterparts in the books and the animated series. For example, if the player puts too much lemonade or soda in the glass and spills some out of the glass, then one of the characters may ask the player "Are you blind?" in a gentle voice. Delivering stuff allows the town to slowly come to life. The Sega version omits the Mr. Fix-it, Dr. Diane, gas station, see saw and Bananas Gorilla portions of the game.

== Reception ==
PC Magazine in December 1993 said that "the youngest kids will love Richard Scarry's Busytown ... Perfect for teaching basic skills in an encouraging, entertaining environment". Computer Gaming World in January 1994 liked the graphics "in spite of some choppiness in the animation. Richard Scarry's characters are faithfully reproduced". The magazine concluded that "Busytown is a must-have if there's a young child in the house". In April 1994 the magazine said that "Busytown is playful learning at its best".

== Legacy ==
A sequel, Richard Scarry's How Things Work in Busytown, received a 1994 North American exclusive release from Novotrade and Simon & Schuster. It is intended for a pre-kindergarten through second grade audience and was released for MS-DOS and Classic Mac OS. The game teaches the player how to assemble machinery, bake bread, and other processes.

A remake of the original Busytown video game was published in 1999 from Simon & Schuster Software, Pearson Software, and Boston Animation. Versions were released for Windows and Classic Mac OS with improved voice acting, graphics, and animation resembling The Busy World of Richard Scarry animated series, and an instrumental cover of the show's theme song playing over the game's credits. The gameplay is the same and the original songs from the 1993 release are included. The original game's Bananas Gorilla activity and Junior Seesaw activity were removed.
