= Busytown =

Fictional town created by author Richard Scarry

- Created by: Richard Scarry
- Original work: Best Word Book Ever (1963)
- Years: 1963–present

Print publications
- Book(s): Best Ever series

Films and television
- Animated series: The Busy World of Richard Scarry (1994–1997); Busytown Mysteries (2007–2010)
- Direct-to-video: Richard Scarry's Best Videos Ever! (1989–1994)

Games
- Video game(s): Richard Scarry's Busytown (1993/1999)^{*}
- ^{*} The latter year refers to when the game was remade.

Busytown is a fictional town depicted in several books by American children's author Richard Scarry. Busytown is inhabited by an assortment of anthropomorphic animals, including Huckle Cat, Lowly Worm, Mr. Frumble, police Sergeant Murphy, Mr. Fixit, Bananas Gorilla and Hilda Hippo.

== Media franchise ==
Busytown also refers to the media franchise that spawned from Richard Scarry's books. From 1989 to 1994, Random House Home Video released the first basic educational learning animated series, called Richard Scarry's Best Videos Ever!. By 1993, Cinar produced the animated series The Busy World of Richard Scarry, featuring the inhabitants of Busytown, which originally aired on Showtime in the United States. A board game and a computer game based on Busytown were also produced in the late 1990s. Another animated series centered on Busytown, Busytown Mysteries, ran in the late 2000s.

== Characters ==
Scarry's Busytown books consist of detailed drawings of busy animals engaged in scenes from daily life. He thought "children find it easier to relate to animals at that age. If you have a picture of a little girl with long blonde hair, then a dark-haired girl isn't going to relate to it as well as she might to a picture of a bunny rabbit."

=== Major characters ===
The most frequently seen characters include:

- The Cat Family: A family of cats.
  - Father Cat: Runs a grocery store and is sometimes referred to as Grocer Cat. His first name is John and frequently does business with Farmer Alfalfa. In the cartoon series The Busy World of Richard Scarry, he works as a travel agent. In Busytown Mysteries, he works in a food store.
  - Mother Cat: A housewife and mother who works as a travel agent. She cares for Huckle, Sally, Lowly, and her husband. Mother Cat's first name is Fiona. In the cartoon series The Busy World of Richard Scarry, she works for the town's newspaper. She is absent in Busytown Mysteries.
  - Huckle Cat: The Cats' school-age son and the protagonist of the series. He is a lovable young kitten boy who is seven years old. Huckle is often shown in the cockpits of planes and flying with Rudolf von Flugel. It is implied that his ambition is to be a pilot when he grows up. Huckle Cat has red spots in The Busy World of Richard Scarry; in Busytown Mysteries and Richard Scarry Presents The Best Series Ever! He is eight years old and has orange spots. Huckle first appeared as a bear in lederhosen, but was later changed to a cat. Huck was the nickname for Scarry's son, Richard Scarry Jr.
  - Sally Cat: Huckle's younger sister. She is five years old. In her early appearances she was known as "Little Sister." Sally Cat has red spots in The Busy World of Richard Scarry; in Busytown Mysteries and Richard Scarry Presents The Best Series Ever! she is six years old and has orange spots.
  - Grandma Cat: Lives in another town and it requires a journey by plane to visit her. She is a skilled driver. She is absent in Busytown Mysteries.
- Lowly Worm: An earthworm and Huckle's best friend. He often stays with the Cats as a house guest. Although he attends school with the Cat children, Lowly can also be seen in more adult situations, like driving a street sweeper or working in the operating room of the Busytown Hospital. Lowly Worm has appeared in Richard Scarry Presents The Best Series Ever! where he is mute until The Busy World of Richard Scarry and Busytown Mysteries. Scarry said that Lowly was his favorite character.
- Lily Bunny: A feisty young rabbit kit girl who is one of Huckle Cat's friends and is the protagonist of the counting episode. She likes going on adventures with her friends and likes to do what she likes best. She seems to be seven years old.
- Freddie Fox: A young red fox kit boy who is one of Huckle's friends. He loves to play games and learn new things. He is six years old.
- Rhonda Raccoon: A young raccoon kit girl who is one of Huckle's good friends. She loves to play with Lily Bunny, Hilda Hippo, Freddie Fox and Huckle Cat and go on amazing adventures with them. She is seven years old.
- Hilda Hippo: A self-conscious hippopotamus calf girl who works as a playground monitor at the elementary school. She also has a fairly obvious crush on Lowly. It is also revealed that she's allergic to roses. She is around eight years old.
- Mary Mouse: A young mouse pup girl who is six years old and is feisty and imaginative.
- Marvin Mouse: Mary's five-year-old brother who wants to be a mailman when he grows up.
- The Pig Family: A family of pigs. Father Pig is a house painter married to a housewife Mother Pig. They have twin children, Harry Pig and Sally Pig. And there's another pig family consisting of Daddy Pig, Mommy Pig, Pa Pig, Ma Pig, Brother Pig, Sister Pig, Henry Pig and Ursula Pig.
- Able Baker Charlie: A mouse who owns Busytown's bakery. As the residential baker, he loves to bake all sorts of things where he is most famous for baking bread. However, sometimes what he bakes does not always turn out right.
- Bananas Gorilla: A gorilla good-guy who can be a thief where his passion for the fruit that bears his name leads him to steal bunches of them from Grocer Cat and leads to his pursuit by Sergeant Murphy. Bananas also has many watches on each wrist. He is a very kind gorilla. Bananas first appeared in "The Great Pie Robbery". In The Busy World of Richard Scarry, he is not a thief and attends school with the other children. Despite this, he can drive a car implying that he is the oldest of the students.
- Mr. Fixit: A red fox repairman who boasts that he can fix anything, but does not often show this ability. He once attempted to fix Mrs. Cat's vacuum cleaner, but it ran on the ceiling instead of the floor. He also fixes a tire on Marvin Mouse's carm but the tire deflates. Mr. Fixit even fixes Hilda Hippo's toaster, but the toaster turns off and two slices of toast went flying.
- Miss Honey: A brown bear is the school teacher at Busytown. She is very kind and motherly, and the mother of Kenny Bear. Her pupils include the Cat children and Lowly Worm.
- Rudolf von Flugel: A red fox pilot who flies a red-coloured German World War I monoplane and dresses in the uniform of a German officer of the time. He often takes Huckle, Lowly and Little Sister up in his planes, though these flights frequently end in disaster. His name is the German word for wing (Flügel). In the United Kingdom editions of the books, his name is Rudolf Strudel.
- Sergeant Murphy: A Cocker Spaniel police officer under the rank of police sergeant who is often present in street and road scenes. He is married and has a little girl named Bridget. Sergeant Murphy is dedicated to his job, and his passion for motorcycles is shown in the fact that he wears his crash helmet in bed. His name is a reflection on the stereotypical Irish-American policeman.
- Mr. Frumble: A clueless pig who often loses and chases after his hat. He drives a pickle-shaped car and is prone to vehicular accidents. Sometimes, Mr. Frumble gets traffic tickets from Sergeant Murphy from some of the accidents.
- Smokey, Sparky, Snozzle and Squirty: A trio of pig firefighters. Sparky and Snozzle wear a saucepan and colander as headgear, and one of them uses a trombone for a siren.

=== Minor characters ===
- Mr. Read-a-Lot: An owl who works at the Busytown Library as a librarian and can often be seen at the front desk.
  - Beverly Baboon: A baboon who works as Mr. Read-a-Lot's assistant librarian.
- April Rhino: A black rhinoceros who works as a ship captain. She appears in The Busy World of Richard Scarry.
- Billy Dog: A hound who appears to be a bully at first glance, but his personality is the complete opposite. He is good friends with Huckle, Hilda, and Lowly. Billy later gets glasses and usually wears a red sweater. He is about seven years old.
- Bully Bobcat: A bobcat who works for the town's newspaper.
- Bumbles Leopard: A leopard.
- Creamwhiskers: A cat who drives a yellow dairy truck.
- Cassie: A grey cat appearing in The Busy World of Richard Scarry.
- Lynnie Raccoon: A young raccoon who attends Huckle Cat's class.
- Deputy Flo: A red fox deputy and friend to Sergeant Murphy.
- Doctor Lion: A lion physician who runs both a private practice and works at the Busytown Hospital and is the primary health care provider for most of the citizens.
  - Nurse Nelly: A cat nurse who often works as Dr. Lion's assistant both at his office and in the hospital.
- Farmer Alfalfa: A goat farmer who owns a farm in the outskirts of Busytown and specializes in growing corn. Non-conscientious drivers can often be seen driving through his fields. Farmer Alfalfa can be seen doing business with Father Cat. He may have been named after a Terrytoons character of the same name.
- Farmer Patrick Pig: A pig farmer who resides on the outskirts of Busytown. He grows corn and wheat.
- Farmer Charlie Cat: A cat farmer who resides on the outskirts of Busytown. He also grows corn and wheat.
- Farmer Fox: A red fox farmer who resides on the outskirts of Busytown. He also works at a farm stand.
- Fred: A squid who runs a fish and chips business.
- Fireman Ralph: A pig fire chief and leader of the Busytown Fire Station.
- Goldbug: A cricket who works as a roving news reporter for the Busytown Action Bug News and drives a small yellow van, appearing in Busytown Mysteries.
- Mr. Gronkle: An elderly, rich, and grouchy common warthog who isn't fond of children. He is rarely compassionate and wants things to go his way. Despite his flaws, Mr. Gronkle sometimes shows a soft side. In Busytown Mysteries, Mr. Gronkle's first name is Gordon.
  - Vanderbuilt: A young common warthog and nephew to Mr. Gronkle who befriends Huckle's group. As mentioned in his first appearance in The Busy World of Richard Scarry episode "Vanderbuilt's New Shows", he is staying with his uncle while his mother (who is Mr. Gronkle's sister) is on a cruise. In Busytown Mysteries, Vanderbuilt had a redesigned appearance.
- Mr. Humperdink: A pig who works at Busytown's bakery, appearing in Richard Scarry's Best Busy People Video Ever and The Busy World of Richard Scarry.
- Baker Fox: A red fox who works as a baker at Busytown's bakery.
- Janitor Joe: A red fox who is a janitor in most places of Busytown including the theatre and Huckle's school.
- Jason the Mason: A pig mason who specializes in building brick foundations and chimneys. Although skilled at his trade, he is somewhat clumsy.
- John Parr Miller: A terrier at the town party, apparently a chef, named after a Disney animator who then moved into illustration of children's books.
- Mayor Fox: A red fox who is the Mayor of Busytown. He always wears a monocle, top hat, and a ribbon of office.
- Ngorongoro Crater: A spotted hyena who is a photographer and whose camera gets a parking ticket.
- Pig-Will and Pig-Won't: Two pig brothers around age 6 who drive a sausage shaped car and are friends of Huckle and Sally. Pig-Will wears a green shirt and/or green overalls and Pig-Won't wears a red shirt/blue overalls. Pig-Will's catchphrase is, "I will! I will!" Pig-Won't's catchphrase is, "I won't."
- Postman Pig: A pig mail carrier. Although not the only carrier in Busytown, his route includes the Cat family's home.
- P.S. Pig: A pig mail carrier, appearing in The Busy World of Richard Scarry.
- Mr. Raccoon: A raccoon who runs a coffeehouse that appears in The Busy World of Richard Scarry.
- Raffles Rat: A rat thief who uses convoluted schemes and elaborate disguises to commit crimes. He may work alone or with a partner and is especially fond of stealing jewelry.
- Robbie Lion: A lion cub who is one of Sally's good friends.
- Mr. Root: An armadillo who works at the community garden. He can be a bit demanding.
- Sawdust the Carpenter: A cat carpenter who builds houses. He sometimes works alone and sometimes with several apprentices.
- Kenny Bear: A young brown bear.
- Lenny Dog: A young dog.
- Farmer Soybeans: A goat farmer who resides on the outskirts of Busytown.
- Sprout Goat: A goat and son to Farmer Soybeans.
- The Beggers: A trio of layabouts who spend their time lazing in the sun or eating or getting into trouble. On one occasion, they were deemed suitable enough to fly to the moon (with Huckle, Lowly, and Mr. Frumble as passengers). An episode of The Busy World of Richard Scarry titled "Practice Makes Perfect" reveals that they used to have a musical group where their knowledge of musical performance helps out Huckle's group in preparing for the Busytown concert.
  - Wolfgang Wolf: A wolf who is the apparent leader of the Beggars.
  - Benny Baboon: A baboon and member of the Beggars. He only says one word even when he often finishes off the sentences of his fellow Beggars.
  - Harry Hyena: A spotted hyena and member of the Beggars.
- Mistress Mouse: A mouse who tears around the streets of Busytown in her pink repair truck helping anyone in need.
- Dingo Dog: A dog who drives a fast red car. He is a very fast and speed-hungry guy who never obeys traffic laws and is always speeding.
- Sam Cat and Dudley Pig: A cat and a pig who are very fine detectives. They will tell you that if anyone has a problem, they can solve it. Sam and Dudly find children who are lost and they catch robbers who steal things, solving mysteries all over Busytown!

== Analysis and criticism ==
In an analysis of the division of labor in Busytown, John Levi Martin noted that predators such as bears and leopards are overrepresented in jobs with greater authority, while pigs overwhelmingly occupied jobs that were unskilled, demeaning, or subordinate. Further, when pigs were involved in an accident, they were at fault 75% of the time. Another writer described ''What Do People Do All Day" as "prophetic," since, by saying "everyone is a worker," it predicts the paradigm shift change from "industrial" to the modern concept of occupation.

Busytown has been praised for its educational value. By presenting animals in having different roles, for example "bear" and "mailman" young children are encouraged to conceive of objects as displaying different conceptual attributes simultaneously. That is, each one can be easily seen as belonging to two categories at the same time. It has also been described as helping children learn prescience skills. The presentation of different scenarios along with questions like: "what do you think might happen next" taught children to interact with and think about what is happening in the drawings.

Scarry was sensitive to claims that his depictions of female characters in Busytown reinforced general stereotypes. In one case, he said, his editor labeled a telephone worker Tom the Telephone Man even though he had given the character a pink bow and called her Tina. He refused to accept, however, that they promoted violence.
