= Tanker =

Tanker may refer to:

== Transportation ==
- Tanker, a tank crewman (US)
- Tanker (ship), a ship designed to carry bulk liquids
  - Chemical tanker, a type of tanker designed to transport chemicals in bulk
  - Oil tanker, also known as a petroleum tanker
  - LNG carrier, a ship designed for transporting liquefied natural gas
- Tank car, a railroad freight car designed for carrying bulk liquids
- Tank truck, a heavy road vehicle designed for carrying bulk liquids
- Fire tanker, a firefighting vehicle used to carry large amounts of water to a fire
- Air tanker, an aircraft used in aerial firefighting
- Tanker (aircraft), an aircraft designed for in-flight refueling
- Tanker 910, a specific aircraft used to drop water or retardant on fires in California
- Tanker Pacific, a Singapore-based shipping company

== Other ==
- André Tanker (1941–2003), Trinidadian musician and composer
- Tanker (album), a 1988 album by Bailter Space
- Tanker boot, a laceless military boot
- Tanker, titular hippopotamus character of the Tinker and Tanker book series
- Tankers (film), a 2018 Russian war film
- Tanker Brewery, an Estonian brewery

== See also ==
- Tank (disambiguation)
