= Tank (surname) =

Tank is a surname found in people of Europe, America and Indian subcontinent. See Taunk for Indian surname.

Notable people with the surname include:

- Jennifer Tank, American ecologist
- Kurt Tank (1898–1983), German aerospace engineer and test pilot
- Manisha Tank (born 1976), CNN International presenter
- Walter Tank (1897–1978), American politician
- Tanche family, also spelled "Tank"
  - Carsten Tank (1766–1832)
  - Carsten Tank Anker (1747–1824)
  - Nils Otto Tank (1800–1864)
