= Best Word Book Ever =

Book by Richard Scarry

- Cover of the 1963 edition of the book
- Author: Richard Scarry
- Illustrator: Richard Scarry
- Cover artist: Richard Scarry
- Language: English
- Publisher: Golden Press
- Publication date: 1963
- Publication place: United States
- Media type: Print (hardcover)
- Pages: 91 (1st edition)

Best Word Book Ever is a best-selling children's book by Richard Scarry. Scarry had been illustrating children's books since 1950, but this was his first as both author and illustrator. The book also marked the beginning of the author's work on the "Best Ever" series. The original edition contains over 1,400 labeled pictures and the book sold over seven million copies in 12 years. The word book is designed to entertain children while teaching them words and numbers. It is divided into subjects on each pair of pages. Subjects range from sports to houses, with examples from all over the world. The pages have a small amount of text, which often challenge the reader to find something on the page. The characters are all anthropomorphic animals, often cats, bears, rabbits and mice, but many other animals are also used. The art for Best Word Book Ever was first drawn in, then painted in, which was by that time Scarry's normal method.

== Publication ==
The book was first published in the United States in 1963, followed by a British edition published in 1964 by Paul Hamlyn and reprinted in 1965. The Best Word Book Ever has been reprinted and revised many times since. The book has been translated into a number of other languages, including a bilingual edition in English and Spanish and one in Ukrainian.

== Editing the Best Word Book Ever ==
The British edition was slightly altered for the British market. For example, the front cover shows a thatched cottage instead of an American style barn, the "When you grow up" pages feature a British soldier instead of an American one and a sprinkling of British Union Jack flags and text were inserted.

By 1980, the book had been edited to remove some of what became perceived as stereotypical roles for females and to update terminology. At least 14 changes were made, including changing a male "policeman" to a female "police officer" on the front cover, and changing "handsome pilot" to "pilot" and "pretty stewardess" into "flight attendant".

The book was reduced in pages from 92 to 72 pages, removing such things as "In the Flower Garden".

== Related works ==
Following his great success with Best Word Book Ever, Richard Scarry went on to create a large number of other children's books in the same style with similar animals, a similar dominance of the art over the text and even similar names, including Best First Book Ever, Best Little Word Book Ever and his last book Richard Scarry's Biggest Word Book Ever. Various Best Ever books were adapted to video and a television series, The Busy World of Richard Scarry, ran on Showtime and Nickelodeon from 1994 to 1997.

== English editions ==
- Publisher: Golden Press, 1963, 91 pages, Hardcover (ASIN B000J07UG8)
- Publisher: Western Publishing Company, Inc., October 1963, Hardcover (ISBN 0307655105)
- Publisher: Paul Hamlyn, 1964, 91 pages, Hardcover, British version
- Publisher: Golden Press, 1980, 72 pages, Hardcover (ISBN 9780307155108, ISBN 0-307-15510-2)
- Publisher: Golden Books, 1999, 72 pages, Hardcover, Large format (ISBN 9780307155108)
- Publisher: Random House Children's Books (with Giant Little Golden Book), September 1999, Hardcover (ISBN 0-307-15510-2)
- Publisher: Luna Rising, September 2004, 64 pages, Hardcover (Bilingual, English-Spanish) (ISBN 9780873588737)
