= Tinker and Tanker =

Children's book series by Richard Scarry

- Tinker and Tanker (1960); Tinker and Tanker Out West (1961); Tinker and Tanker and Their Space Ship (1961); Tinker and Tanker and the Pirates (1961); Tinker and Tanker: Knights of the Round Table (1963); Tinker and Tanker in Africa (1963)
- Author: Richard Scarry
- Illustrator: Richard Scarry
- Cover artist: Richard Scarry
- Country: United States
- Language: English
- Genre: Children's literature
- Publisher: Doubleday
- Published: 1960–1963
- No. of books: 6

Tinker and Tanker is a children's book series written and illustrated by Richard Scarry, and published in the U.S. by Doubleday from 1960 to 1963.

== Overview ==
The title characters live in a place called Tootletown. Upon the first book's release in 1960, Doubleday described both of them as "Tinker, the quick-witted rabbit, and Tanker, the strong, steady hippopotamus." A total of six titles were published within the next three years.

According to Walter Retan and Ole Risom, "[Their adventures] were typical picture storybooks, with simple plots and very little text. The characters were all animals, for the most part behaving very much like humans, and the drawings showed the strong sense of the absurd that would become a trademark of [Scarry's] books." Cost restrictions at Doubleday caused the illustrations within each book to alternate between full-color and monochrome; this limitation also affected Scarry's work for a compilation of Jean de La Fontaine's fables. Ultimately, Tinker and Tanker only proved a moderate success. Three of the stories were collected for an omnibus edition in 1968.

== Titles ==
- Tinker and Tanker (1960)
- Tinker and Tanker Out West (1961)
- Tinker and Tanker and Their Space Ship (1961)
- Tinker and Tanker and the Pirates (1961)
- Tinker and Tanker: Knights of the Round Table (1963)
- Tinker and Tanker in Africa (1963)
