= Tank (German singer) =

German musician and martial artist (born 1977)

Tank (born Eric Geisenheyner on July 1, 1977, in Hamburg, Germany) is a German musician and martial artist known best as the vocalist on several hit techno songs. Born to Ghanaian parents, he was adopted by a family in Hamburg following the accidental death of his parents. He first came to prominence by winning several Karate championships in Hamburg, and eventually won a national championship.

Although he had always been an enthusiast of Progressive electronic music, it was Tank’s encounter with some DJs at a club in Hamburg, that spurred him on to consider a career in music. The producers invited him to be the vocalist on "Can U Feel The Bass?", which was still in production at this time. He accepted the invitation, and the song went on to become a hit in 1997. The following year, they teamed up again to release another club track entitled "The Return Of Power", whose music video was shot in London.

Personalities that Tank has collaborated with include Sista Rude, DJ Darling, Christopher Von Deylen, and Dee Jay Sören.
