= Tank top =

Tank top may refer to:

- Tank top (shirt), a type of sleeveless shirt (US/Australian/Canadian English)
- Tank top (sweater), also known as a sweater vest
