= Tank (nickname) =

Tank or The Tank is the nickname of:

- Tank Abbott (born 1965), mixed martial artist
- Júlio Baptista (born 1981), Brazilian football player nicknamed "The Tank"
- Tank Bigsby (born 2001), American football player
- Tank Black (born 1957), disgraced former sports agent
- Tank Carder (born 1989), American football player
- George Carr (baseball) (1894-1948), American Negro league baseball player
- Tank Carradine (born 1989), American football player
- Tank Collins (born 1969), American retired basketball player
- Tank Daniels (born 1981), American football player
- Gervonta Davis (born 1994), American professional boxer
- Tony Gordon (rugby) (c. 1948/1949-2012), New Zealand rugby league and rugby union player and coach
- Tank Johnson (born 1981), American football player
- Frank Kaminsky (born 1993), American basketball player
- DeMarcus Lawrence (born 1992), American football player
- Bajrang Punia (born 1994), Indian freestyle wrestler nicknamed "The Tank"
- Tank Tyler (born 1985), American football player
- Tank van Rooyen (1892-1942), South African rugby union and rugby league footballer
- Tank Williams (born 1980), American football player
- Paul "Tank" Younger (1928-2001), pioneering African-American football player
- The Tank, a nickname for English footballer Duncan Edwards
