= Tank Pond =

Tank Pond may refer to:

- Tank pond, water storage by water stops
- Tank Pond, a lake in Nova Scotia, Canada
- Tank Pond, by Parksville, Kentucky
- Tank Pond, by Florida State Road 77 and Florida State Road 20, Florida
