= Richard Scarry =

American author and illustrator (1919–1994)

- Born: Richard McClure Scarry; June 5, 1919; Boston, Massachusetts, U.S.
- Died: April 30, 1994 (aged 74); Gstaad, Switzerland
- Occupations: Author, illustrator
- Spouse: Patricia Murphy
- Children: 1
- Writing career
- Genre: Children's books
- Notable work: Best Word Book Ever

Richard McClure Scarry (/ˈskæriː/; June 5, 1919 – April 30, 1994) was an American children's author and illustrator who published over 300 books with total sales of over 100 million worldwide. He is best known for his Best Ever book series that take place primarily in the fictional town of Busytown, "which is populated by friendly and helpful resident [animals...such as] Mr. Frumble, Huckle Cat, Mr. Fixit, Lowly Worm, and others..." The series spawned a media franchise.

== Early life and education ==
Richard Scarry, the second-oldest of five children, was born in Boston, Massachusetts on 5 June 1919 to Mary McClure and John Scarry Sr.. His parents were of Irish-American ancestry, and ran a small department store chain. Scarry had four siblings: older brother John Jr., younger sister Barbara, and younger brothers Edward and Leo. The family enjoyed a comfortable life in the Dorchester neighborhood, even during the Great Depression.

Following high school, Scarry enrolled in Boston Business School, but dropped out in 1938. He then studied at the School of the Museum of Fine Arts in Boston, the Archipenko Art School in Woodstock, New York, and the Eliot O'Hara Watercolor School in Goose Rocks, Kennebunkport, Maine. He was drafted into the U.S. Army in 1942.

== Career ==
After entering the Army, Scarry was assigned to the military's radio repair school. After small success at that trade, he was chosen to paint a large sign and was then made an art director after receiving a medical dispensation "from strenuous physical activity." Later he became "Editor and Writer of Publications for the Information and Morale Services Section of the Allied Force Headquarters", served in North Africa, and was discharged from the Army in 1946. After the war, Scarry worked in magazine and advertising in New York City, including a very brief stint at Vogue. In 1949, he made a career breakthrough with Little Golden Books.

Scarry's most famous series of books was about Busytown and revolved around anthropomorphic animals. While his books are largely populated by common animal species, he proved to be quite adept at giving human characteristics to a seemingly endless number of creatures, machines, and creations. Many of his later illustrations feature characters in traditional Swiss clothing and show architecturally correct drawings of half-timber houses.

The fabric of Scarry's world was woven with a strong sense of community and cooperation. His characters work together, be it building a house or constructing a highway. And he endowed his characters with an honest humanity that underscores his tales. Scarry knew children needed to know that they did not have to be perfect all the time.

A snapshot of Scarry's illustration style from the book Busy, Busy Town

Scarry was a disciplined worker. Scarry was closely associated with mass-market children's publisher Ole Risom. They worked together on dozens of books, including I Am a Bunny, which Risom wrote and Scarry illustrated. First published in 1963, it remained in print into the 2000s. Risom and Walter Retan also co-wrote an illustrated biography, The Busy, Busy World of Richard Scarry. In the 1980s and 1990s, many of Scarry's Best Ever books were produced as animated videos and aired during TLC's now-defunct Ready Set Learn! block. The Busytown books were also adapted into an animated series, The Busy World of Richard Scarry, which was produced by Canada-based CINAR (now WildBrain) and Paramount Television and aired on the pay-TV channel Showtime from 1993 to 1997. It reran in the late 1990s on Nickelodeon and its sister channel Noggin (now Nick Jr.). A further animated series, Busytown Mysteries, was commissioned by CBC from the Cookie Jar Group (the successor to CINAR) in 2007, and it aired on the Kids' CBC morning programming block.

Busytown was featured at the Carnegie Museums of Pittsburgh from June 13 to September 8, 2002, in an interactive exhibit, Richard Scarry's Busytown. His books were popular with children throughout the world, with over 100 million copies sold.

Scarry's papers and drawings are collected in the University of Connecticut archives.

== Personal life and family ==
While working as a freelance illustrator, Scarry met Patricia "Patsy" Murphy, a writer of children's textbooks, when they collaborated on one of her books; they married in 1948. She wrote many of the stories in his subsequent children's books, such as Good Night, Little Bear; The Bunny Book; and The Fishing Cat. Before moving to Europe, the family lived on a farm in Ridgefield, Connecticut.

In 1972, Scarry and his wife moved to Lausanne, Switzerland. In 1974, they bought a chalet in nearby Gstaad, where Scarry enjoyed spending time with his adult son, Richard Scarry Jr., skiing, coin collecting, and sailing.

Scarry's son is also an illustrator, who sometimes works in his father's style, using the name Huck Scarry. He moved to Vienna, Austria, and has four children.

== Death ==
On April 30, 1994, in Gstaad, Switzerland, Scarry died of a heart attack, caused by complications from esophageal cancer, at age 74.

== Bibliography ==
Scarry began his book career in 1949 as an illustrator of books by other people, specifically Kathryn & Byron Jackson's Mouse's House. He continued as only or primarily an illustrator through 1955, then began turning out original books.

His titles, in order of publication, are:

Golden Books

- Mouse's House, 1949
- Duck and His Friends, 1949
- Two Little Miners, 1949
- My Little Golden Dictionary, 1949
- Christopher Bunny and Other Animal Stories, 1949
- First Book Ever, 1950
- Animals' Merry Christmas, 1950
- Here Comes the Parade, 1951
- The Gingerbread Man, 1953
- Rabbit and His Friends, 1954
- The Party Pig, 1954
- Pierre Bear, 1954
- The Bunny Book, 1955
- Nursery Tales, 1958
- Rudolph the Red Nosed Reindeer, 1958
- Cars and Trucks, 1959
- Firemen and Fire Engine Stamps, 1959
- Naughty Bunny, 1959
- Tinker and Tanker (ISBN 0-385-06010-6), 1960
- Just for Fun (ISBN 0-307-02116-5), 1960
- Chicken Little, 1960
- Tinker and Tanker Out West, 1961
- Tinker and Tanker and Their Space Ship, 1961
- Tinker and Tanker and the Pirates, 1961
- Good Night, Little Bear, 1961
- The Country Mouse and The City Mouse, 1961
- The Hickory Dickory Clock Book, 1961
- Tommy Visits the Doctor, 1962
- My Little Golden Book of Manners, 1962
- Manners, 1962
- What Animals Do, 1963
- A Tinker and Tanker Coloring Book, 1963
- I Am a Bunny (ISBN 0-307-12125-9), 1963
- Chipmunk's ABC, 1963
- The Rooster Struts, 1963
- Best Word Book Ever (ISBN 0-307-15510-2), first published 1963, reprinted 1970, "new revised edition" 1980
- Tinker and Tanker, Knights of the Round Table, 1963
- Tinker and Tanker in Africa, 1963
- Polite Elephant, 1964
- Is This the House of Mistress Mouse? (ISBN 0-307-12029-5), 1964
- Feed the Hippo His ABC's, 1964
- Animal Mother Goose, 1964
- Best Nursery Rhymes Ever, 1964 (reprinted as Best Mother Goose Ever)
- Busy, Busy World, 1965
- Teeny Tiny Tales, 1965
- The Santa Claus Book, 1965
- The Bunny Book, 1965
- Storybook Dictionary: A Giant Golden Book, 1966 (reprinted as Best Picture Dictionary Ever)
- Planes, 1967
- Trains, 1967
- Boats (ISBN 0-307-11537-2), 1967
- Cars, 1967
- Egg in the Hole Book, 1967
- Springtime Tales, 1967
- Autumn Tales, 1967
- Winter Tales, 1967
- Best Story Book Ever (ISBN 0-307-16548-5), 1967
- What Do People Do All Day? (ISBN 0-394-81823-7), 1968
- The Early Bird/Lowly Worm Meets the Early Bird (ISBN 0-394-81138-0), 1968 (Early Moments)
- What Animals Do, 1968
- The Great Pie Robbery, 1969
- The Supermarket Mystery, 1969
  (The above two were combined in the omnibus Great Big Mystery Book (ISBN 0-00-138143-1), also 1969.)
- Great Big Schoolhouse (ISBN 0-00-138150-4), 1969
- Summer Tales, 1970
- Great Big Air Book (ISBN 0-394-92167-4), 1971
- Best Stories Ever, 1971
- ABC Word Book (ISBN 978-0-394-82339-3 ISBN 978-1-4027-7221-4), 1971
- Look and Learn Library (4 Vols.) (Library of Congress 75-151-440), 1971
- * Fun with Words
- * Things to Know
- * Going Places
- * Best Stories Ever
- Hop Aboard! Here We Go! (ISBN 0-307-13756-2, ISBN 978-0-307-13756-2), 1972
- Funniest Storybook Ever (ISBN 0-00-138145-8), 1972
- Nicky Goes to the Doctor, 1972
- Silly Stories, 1973
- Babykins and His Family, 1973

Random House

- Find Your ABC's, 1973
- Please and Thank You Book (ISBN 0-394-82681-7), 1973
- Cars and Trucks and Things That Go (ISBN 0-307-15785-7), 1974
- Best Rainy Day Book Ever, 1974
- European Word Book, 1974

Golden Books

- Animal Nursery Tales (ISBN 978-0-307-66810-3), 1975
- Great Steamboat Mystery, 1975
- Best Counting Book Ever, 1975

Random House

- Busiest People Ever (ISBN 0-00-711151-7), 1976
- Favorite Storybook, 1976
- Busy Town, Busy People, 1976
- Storytime, 1976
- Look-Look Books, 1976 (10 Vols.)
- Early Words, 1976
- Color Book, 1976
- Laugh and Learn Library, 1976 (4 Vols.)
- Picture Dictionary, 1976
- Teeny Tiny ABC, 1976
- Learn to Count, 1976
- Lowly Worm Story Book, 1977
- Busy, Busy Word Book, 1977
- Best Make-It Book Ever, 1977
- Busy-Busy Counting Book, 1977
- Postman Pig and His Busy Neighbors, 1978
- Toy Book, 1978
- Bedtime Stories, 1978
- Stories to Color, 1978
- Little Word Book, 1978
- Punch-Out Toy Book, 1978
- Things to Learn, 1978
- Little ABC, 1978
- Best First Book Ever, 1979
- Tinker and Tanker and Tales of Pirates and Knights, 1979
- To Market, To Market, 1979
- Holiday Book, 1979
- Work and Play Book, 1979
- Mix and Match Storybook, 1979
- Huckle's Book, 1979
- Busytown Pop-Up Book, 1979
- Can You Count?, 1979
- Lowly Worm Things on Wheels, 1979
- Peasant Pig and the Terrible Dragon (ISBN 0-394-84567-6), 1980
- Christmas Mice, 1981
- Best Christmas Book Ever (ISBN 0-394-94936-6, ISBN 978-0-394-94936-9), 1981
- Busy Houses, 1981
- Four Busy Word Books, 1982
- Busytown Shape Book, 1982
- Sticker Books, 1982 (3 Vols.)
- Lowly Worm Cars and Trucks Book, 1983
- Lowly Worm Bath Book, 1984
- The Best Mistake Ever! and Other Stories, 1984 (Early Moments)
- Best Bumper Book Ever, 1984
- Pig Will and Pig Won't: A Book of Manners (ISBN 0-679-86653-1), 1984
- Busy Fun and Learn Book, 1984
- Biggest Word Book Ever! (ISBN 0-394-87374-2), 1985
- My First Word Book, 1986
- Big and Little, 1986
- Splish Splash Sounds, 1986
- Best Workbooks Ever! (FUN With Letters), 1986 (4 Vols.)
- Best Workbooks Ever! (FUN With Numbers), 1986 (3 Vols.)
- Best Music Book Ever, 1987
- Things That Go, 1987
- Things to Love, 1987
- Busy Workers, 1987
- Lowly Worm's Schoolbag, 1987 (4 Vols.)
- Getting Ready for School, 1987 (4 Vols.)
- Going Places on the Water, 1987 (4 Vols.)
- Learning How Sticker Book, 1988
- Giant Coloring Book, 1988
- Busy Busy Sticker Book, 1988
- Best Times Ever, 1988
- Activity Book, 1988
- Best Bedtime Book Ever, 1988
- Best Read and Learn Book Ever, 1988
- Biggest First Book Ever, 1988
- Busy, Busy World (ISBN 0-307-65539-3), 1988
- Dr. Doctor, 1988
- Farmer Patrick Pig, 1988
- Frances Fix-It, 1988
- Harry and Larry the Fishermen, 1988
- Play Day, 1988
- Smokey the Fireman, 1988

Golden Books

- Sniff the Detective, 1988
- All About Cars, 1989
- Best Friend Ever, 1989
- Best Ride Ever, 1989
- Best Two-Minute Stories Ever!, 1989
- Mother Goose Scratch and Sniff Book, 1989
- Best Ever, 1989
- Tinker and Tanker Storybook, 1989
- Welcome to Scarrytown, 1989

Random House

- Best Puzzle Word Book Ever, 1989
- Just Right Word Book, 1990
- Counting Book, 1990
- Be Careful, Mr Frumble, 1990
- Best Read It Yourself Book Ever, 1990
- Best Story Book Ever, 1991
- ABC's, 1991
- Watch Your Step, Mr. Rabbit!, 1991
- Best Busy Year Ever, 1991
- The Cat Family Takes a Trip, 1991
- The Cat Family's Busy Day, 1991
- Mr. Frumble's Worst Day Ever, 1991
- Sergeant Murphy's Busiest Day Ever!, 1992
- Best Fairytales Ever, 1992
- Best Little Word Book Ever, 1992
- Biggest Pop-Up Book Ever!, 1992
- Bananas Gorilla, 1992
- Huckle Cat's Busiest Day Ever, 1992
- Word Book With Huckle Cat and Lowly Worm, 1992
- Mr. Fix-It: Richard Scarry's Smallest Pop-Up Book Ever!, 1992
- Mr. Frumble: Richard Scarry's Smallest Pop-Up Book Ever!, 1992
- Biggest Make-It Book Ever, 1993
- Colors, 1993
- First Words, 1993
- Story Book, 1993
- Pie Rats Ahoy!, 1994 (Early Moments)
- Busy, Busy Town (ISBN 0-307-16803-4), 1994 (posthumous)
- Longest Book Ever! (ISBN 0-689-80134-3), 1995 (Posthumous)
- The Worst Helper Ever!, 1998 (Posthumous) (Early Moments)
- Chuckle with Huckle! and Other Easy-to-Read Funny Stories, 2005 (posthumous) (Early Moments)

Many of these titles are preceded by his name ("Richard Scarry's ..."), and may be so listed in library and booksellers' databases. Some (Pie Rats Ahoy!, Best Mistake Ever! and The Early Bird) were published under the Beginner Books (Grolier and Early Moments only) imprint, and others (Chuckle with Huckle! and Other Easy-to-Read Funny Stories and The Worst Helper Ever [Early Moments only]) as Bright and Early Books, although all are targeted at beginning readers. Scarry also illustrated a 1963 edition of The Fables of La Fontaine, and in 1993 put his own stamp on a series of familiar nursery stories (Little Red Riding Hood, The Little Red Hen, The Three Bears, The Three Little Pigs).

== Stories made to video ==
Golden Book Videos:

- The Gingerbread Man and Other Nursery Stories (Golden Book 1985)
- Old MacDonald's Farm and Other Animal Tales (Golden Book 1986)
- Get Ready for School (Golden Step Ahead 1986, 1991)

Random House Videos: (These were taken out of print by 2006)

Richard Scarry's:

- Best ABC Video Ever! (Random House 1989)
- Best Counting Video Ever! (Random House 1989)
- Best Busy People Video Ever! (Random House 1993)
- Best Learning Songs Video Ever! (Random House 1993)
- Best Silly Stories and Songs Video Ever! (Random House 1994)
- Best Sing-Along Mother Goose Video Ever! (Random House 1994)

PolyGram Videos:

The Busy World of Richard Scarry:

- The Best Birthday Present Ever and 2 Other Stories (Cinar 1993)
- Sergeant Murphy's Day Off and 2 Other Stories (Cinar 1993)
- The Busiest Firefighters Ever and 2 Other Stories (Cinar 1993)
- Mr. Frumble's New Cars and 2 Other Stories (Cinar 1993)
- A Trip To The Moon and 2 Other Stories (Cinar 1993)
- The Snowstorm and 2 Other Stories (Cinar 1993)
- The Best Babysitter Ever and 2 Other Stories (Cinar 1993)
- Summer Picnic and 2 Other Stories (Cinar 1993)
- Sally's First Day At School and 2 Other Stories (Cinar 1993, 1994, 1995)
- New Friend On The Block and 2 Other stories (Cinar 1993, 1994, 1995)

Richard Scarry's:

- The Best Christmas Present Ever and 2 Other Stories (Cinar 1993, 1994, 1995)
- The Best Birthday Party Ever and 2 Other Stories (Cinar 1993, 1994, 1995)
- Now I Know My 123's and 2 and 2 Other Stories (Cinar 1993, 1994, 1995)
- The Best Spelling Bee Ever and 2 Other Stories (Cinar 1993, 1994, 1995)
- The First Halloween Ever and 2 Other Stories (Cinar 1993, 1994, 1995)
- The Best Christmas Surprise Ever and 2 Other Stories (Cinar 1993, 1994, 1995)
- Be My Valentine and 2 Other Stories (Cinar 1993, 1994, 1995)
- The First Easter Egg Ever and 2 Other Stories (Cinar 1993, 1994, 1995)
- Practice Makes Perfect and 2 Other Stories (Cinar 1993, 1994, 1995)
- Making Progress and 2 Other Stories (Cinar 1993, 1994, 1995)
