= The Busy World of Richard Scarry =

Canadian/French animated children's television series

- Cover for The Busy World of Richard Scarry: Every Day There's Something New DVD
- Genre: Animated series
- Written by: Various
- Directed by: Greg Bailey; Marcos Da Silva; Pascal Morelli; Stephan Martinière; Nadja Cozic
- Voices of: Keith Knight; Sonja Ball
- Theme music composer: Milan Kymlicka
- Composer: Laurent Petitgirard
- Countries of origin: Canada; France
- No. of seasons: 5
- No. of episodes: 65 (195 segments)

Production
- Executive producer: Micheline Charest
- Producer: Ronald A. Weinberg
- Running time: 30 minutes
- Production companies: CINAR Films; France Animation; Paramount Television

Original release
- Network: Family Channel (Canadian English); Ici Radio-Canada Télé (Canadian French); France 3 (France); Canal J (France)
- Release: March 9, 1994 – March 29, 1996

Related
- Busytown Mysteries

The Busy World of Richard Scarry is an animated children's television series, produced by CINAR Films and France Animation in association with Paramount Television, that aired from 1994 to 1996, first on Showtime, later on Nickelodeon, and ran for 65 episodes. The television series was based on the books drawn and written by Richard Scarry.

== Overview ==
The series takes place in the fictional city of Busytown and mainly stars Huckle Cat, Lowly Worm and many of the other residents of Busytown. Every character in the series is an anthropomorphic animal, most commonly pigs, foxes, breeds of dogs, mice, rabbits, goats, and cats.

Each episode always features a conflict (which is eventually resolved in the end). However, episodes featuring other anthropomorphic animals, like Couscous catching Pépé le Gangstaire and his dirty rats, Sam and Dudley, Sneef and Sniff, Cucumber and Pickles, etc. have taken place outside of Busytown in other places around the world. There were also outside of Busytown episodes that detail that show's history of certain things like the different prehistoric inventions done by cave pigs, the witnessing of the first printing press, the discovery of America, the formation of the Olympic Games, the invention of macaroni, the invention of the first hot air balloon, the painting of the Sistine Chapel, the invention of the first horseless carriage, the first Halloween, and the creation of the first Easter egg.

== Episodes ==
| Season | Episodes | Originally released | |
| Season | Episodes | First released | Last released |
|---|---|---|---|
| 1 | 13 | March 9, 1994 | May 29, 1994 |
| 2 | 13 | March 1, 1995 | May 24, 1995 |
| 3 | 13 | May 31, 1995 | August 23, 1995 |
| 4 | 13 | August 30, 1995 | November 22, 1995 |
| 5 | 13 | January 5, 1996 | March 29, 1996 |

The writers credit are as they appear on screen credits. At least 12 episodes credited to Thomas LaPierre on-screen were actually written by American writer David Ehrman.

=== Season 1 (1994) ===
| No. | Title | Directed by | Written by | Original release date |
|---|---|---|---|---|
| 1 | "The Talking Bread" | Greg Bailey | Morton Ritts | March 13, 1994 |
| 1 | "Couscous, the North African Detective" | Pascal Morelli & Stephan Martiniere | Don Arioli | March 13, 1994 |
| 1 | "The Three Fishermen" | Greg Bailey | S.M. Molitor | March 13, 1994 |
A bread in Able Baker Charlie's bakery repeatedly says "Mama". Couscous catches Peppy the Gangster and his Dirty Rats who intend to steal the Jewel-of-Jewel. The Cat Family goes fishing and returning with fish of different sizes.
| 2 | "The Best Birthday Present Ever" | Greg Bailey | Thomas LaPierre | March 9, 1994 (special primetime airing) |
| 2 | "Patrick Pig Learns to Talk" | Pascal Morelli & Stephan Martiniere | Joseph Mallozzi | March 9, 1994 (special primetime airing) |
| 2 | "Grouchy Mr. Gronkle" | Greg Bailey | S.M. Molitor | March 9, 1994 (special primetime airing) |
Mother Cat gets a birthday present in the form of a cuckoo clock. The mute Patrick Pig's talkative Irish forefathers try to teach him how to speak for the first time. The grouchy Mr. Gronkle is angry when kids start skating on his frozen pond, but ends up needing their help.
| 3 | "The Busiest Firefighters Ever" | Greg Bailey | Cliff MacGillivray | March 20, 1994 |
| 3 | "Manuel of Mexico" | Pascal Morelli | Thomas LaPierre | March 20, 1994 |
| 3 | "The Biggest Catch Ever" | Greg Bailey | Thomas LaPierre | March 20, 1994 |
Huckle and Lowly join Smoky and his Firefighters for one day, and accidentally ruin someone's barbecue. Manuel breaks his mom's pot. Rudolph Von Flugel takes Huckle and Lowly in his hot air balloon.
| 4 | "Mr. Raccoon's Different Day" | Greg Bailey | Bruce Robb | March 27, 1994 |
| 4 | "Mario, the Venetian Gondolier" | Pascal Morelli | Joseph Mallozi | March 27, 1994 |
| 4 | "The Best Babysitter Ever" | Greg Bailey | Thomas LaPierre | March 27, 1994 |
Mr. Raccoon tries to have a different day. Mario is introduced and his career as operating gondoliers in Venice. Hilda babysits Pig Will and Pig Won't.
| 5 | "The Best Mistake Ever" | Greg Bailey | Thomas LaPierre | April 3, 1994 |
| 5 | "Sneef, the Best Detective in Europe" | Pascal Morelli | Thomas LaPierre | April 3, 1994 |
| 5 | "Camping Out" | Greg Bailey | S.M. Molitor | April 3, 1994 |
Huckle forgets a shopping list. Sneef and Sniff succeed in catching the Royal Jewels. The Cat family goes camping.
| 6 | "Mr. Frumble's New Cars" | Greg Bailey | Cliff MacGillivary | April 10, 1994 |
| 6 | "Ernst and Heidi in the Alps" | Pascal Morelli | Thomas LaPierre | April 10, 1994 |
| 6 | "Billy Dog's Bad Day" | Greg Bailey | Thomas LaPierre | April 10, 1994 |
When Mr. Frumble crashes his car, he steals the bulldozer from Roger Rhino, a taxi and the airplane from Rudolph Von Flugel. Ernst tries to join Heidi on the rescue patrol but is a bad climber. The new kid Billy Dog has a bad first day as he intimidates people with his gruff personality.
| 7 | "The Snowstorm" | Greg Bailey | Morton Ritts & Fern Miller, S.M. Molitor | April 17, 1994 |
| 7 | "Professor Dig and His Egyptian Mummy" | Pascal Morelli | Joseph Mallozzi | April 17, 1994 |
| 7 | "The Treasure Hunt" | Greg Bailey | Morton Ritts & Fern Miller, S.M. Molitor | April 17, 1994 |
Hilda believes her strength only causes trouble on the playground, but when a big snowstorm causes havoc in Busytown, her strength helps them out. Professor Dig discovers an Egyptian mummy. A treasure hunt takes place on the beach, but all Huckle and Lowly find is junk.
| 8 | "The Missing Bananas" | Greg Bailey | Rick Jones | April 24, 1994 |
| 8 | "Good Luck in Rome" | Pascal Morelli | S.M. Molitor | April 24, 1994 |
| 8 | "The Accident" | Greg Bailey | Thomas LaPierre | April 24, 1994 |
Bananas Gorilla steals a batch of bananas. Maria and Frederico want to throw a coin into the lucky Trevi fountain. Mr. Fixit's traffic light causes an accident.
| 9 | "A Trip to the Moon" | Greg Bailey | Thomas LaPierre | May 1, 1994 |
| 9 | "Pip Pip Goes to London" | Pascal Morelli | Bruce Robbs | May 1, 1994 |
| 9 | "Floating Bananas" | Greg Bailey | Thomas LaPierre | May 1, 1994 |
Wolfgang, Benny, Harry and Lowly try to fly to the moon. Pip Pip goes to London to find the Queen's ring, and experiences many problems. Bananas wants to work on a banana cargo ship.
| 10 | "Hat Pie" | Greg Bailey | Thomas LaPierre | May 8, 1994 |
| 10 | "Hans, the Dutch Plumber" | Pascal Morelli | Bruce Robb | May 8, 1994 |
| 10 | "Hilda's Romantic Tea Party" | Greg Bailey | Thomas LaPierre | May 8, 1994 |
Lowly's hat goes missing. Hans, a plumber working at the Dutch Windmills experiences a leak in a dyke. Hilda has a matchmaking tea party.
| 11 | "A Big Operation" | Greg Bailey | S.M. Molitor | May 15, 1994 |
| 11 | "Cucumber, the African Photographer" | Pascal Morelli | Cliff MacGillivray | May 15, 1994 |
| 11 | "Summer Picnic" | Greg Bailey | Thomas LaPierre | May 15, 1994 |
Huckle gets his tonsils removed in a big operation, but pulls through on the promise of getting ice cream as a reward. Cucumber is really nervous about photographing lions. The class goes on a picnic, but a big storm forces them into a scary cave.
| 12 | "Sergeant Murphy's Day Off" | Greg Bailey | Bruce Robb | May 22, 1994 |
| 12 | "Schmudge, the German Chimney Sweep" | Pascal Morelli | Thomas LaPierre | May 22, 1994 |
| 12 | "The Sleeping Car Adventure" | Greg Bailey | Thomas LaPierre | May 22, 1994 |
Sergeant Murphy gets his first day off. Schmudge, a chimney Sweeper in Germany has no luck. Hilda takes a train ride while babysitting.
| 13 | "Busytown Regatta" | Greg Bailey | Patrick Granleese | May 29, 1994 |
| 13 | "Schtoompah, the Funny Austrian" | Pascal Morelli | Thomas LaPierre | May 29, 1994 |
| 13 | "Busytown Soap Box Derby" | Greg Bailey | Thomas LaPierre | May 29, 1994 |
Busytown celebrates a regatta race. Schtoompah wreaks havoc when he blows his tuba too hard. A Soap box race takes place in Busytown and Sally is left out.

=== Season 2 (1995) ===
Every episode this season was directed by Greg Bailey.

| No. overall | No. in season | Title | Written by | Original release date |
|---|---|---|---|---|
| 14 | 1 | "The Big Story" | S.M. Molitor | March 1, 1995 |
| 14 | 1 | "Couscous in Gibraltar" | Don Arioli | March 1, 1995 |
| 14 | 1 | "The Firefighter's Ball" | Cliff MacGillivray | March 1, 1995 |
Huckle and Lowly become news reporters. Couscous captures Peppy and his Dirty Rats in Gibraltar. Smoky, Sparkey and Nozzle get a firefighters ball.
| 15 | 2 | "The Field Trip" | Rowby Goren | March 8, 1995 |
| 15 | 2 | "The Great Pie Robbery" | Stephen Ashton | March 8, 1995 |
| 15 | 2 | "Clean Garage" | Joseph Malliozzi | March 8, 1995 |
The Scouts go on a field trip. Madame Dog's pies get stolen. The Cat Family cleans out their garage.
| 16 | 3 | "Captain Willy and the Pirates" | S.M. Molitor | March 15, 1995 |
| 16 | 3 | "Flying Noodles" | Rowby Goren | March 15, 1995 |
| 16 | 3 | "Roughing It" | Thomas LaPierre | March 15, 1995 |
Captain Willy is put ashore by pirates and attempts to get his boat back, as well as catch them. Cucumber takes pictures of a Japanese noodle chef Sato. Fixit takes the scouts to camp.
| 17 | 4 | "Young Vikings" | Rowby Goren | March 22, 1995 |
| 17 | 4 | "Sneef Saves the Queen" | Thomas LaPierre | March 22, 1995 |
| 17 | 4 | "Hilda the Director" | Nicole Keefler | March 22, 1995 |
Huckle and Lowly go sailing on a raft that they built. Sneef captures the culprit who stole the Queen of England's crown. Hilda holds auditions for actors to star in her play.
| 18 | 5 | "High Flyers" | Thomas LaPierre | March 29, 1995 |
| 18 | 5 | "Steamboat Mystery" | Joseph Mallozzi | March 29, 1995 |
| 18 | 5 | "The Best Waiters Ever" | Bruce Robb | March 29, 1995 |
Rudolph Von Flugel takes Huck and Lowly up in his plane. A mystery involving a steamboat takes place. Mayor Fox invites another mayor to a restaurant.
| 19 | 6 | "The Big Move" | Stephen Ashton | April 5, 1995 |
| 19 | 6 | "Sneef in Russia" | Joseph Mallozzi | April 5, 1995 |
| 19 | 6 | "Mr. Frumble Gets a Job" | Cliff MacGillivray | April 5, 1995 |
Billy Dog is moving away. Sneef and Sniff save a Russian mystery. Mr. Frumble gets his first job.
| 20 | 7 | "Ambulance Cake" | Ken Ross | April 12, 1995 |
| 20 | 7 | "The Supermarket Mystery" | Rowby Goren | April 12, 1995 |
| 20 | 7 | "Big Trouble for Bananas Gorilla" | S.M. Molitor | April 12, 1995 |
The hospital hosts a bake sale. Groceries are stolen from the supermarket. Bananas Gorilla gets in more big trouble at his garage job.
| 21 | 8 | "Sergeant Murphy's Deputy" | Ken Ross | April 19, 1995 |
| 21 | 8 | "Couscous in the Sahara" | Don Arioli | April 19, 1995 |
| 21 | 8 | "New Friend on the Block" | Rowby Goren | April 19, 1995 |
Overworked Sergeant Murphy gets help from Deputy Flo. Couscous catches Pepe and his Dirty Rats by trapping them in an Egyptian pyramid that they are searching for treasure in. A new friend for Huckle arrives on his street as he tries to deliver cookies to a new neighbor.
| 22 | 9 | "The Biggest Storm Ever" | Cliff MacGillivray | April 26, 1995 |
| 22 | 9 | "Cucumber in Rockies" | Stephen Ashton & Thomas LaPierre | April 26, 1995 |
| 22 | 9 | "Sally's First Day at School" | Bruce Robb | April 26, 1995 |
A big storm occurs and Sergeant Murphy evacuates all of Busytown to a shelter, but Mr. Gronkle is left behind. Cucumber manages to stop a runaway boxcar that is carrying a wedding cake in the Canadian rockies. Sally Cat starts kindergarten but would rather stay home and play with puppets.
| 23 | 10 | "No Time for Bananas" | Thomas LaPierre | May 3, 1995 |
| 23 | 10 | "Sneef in India" | Joseph Mallozzi | May 3, 1995 |
| 23 | 10 | "Sally Cat's First Trip" | Thomas LaPierre | May 3, 1995 |
Bananas Gorilla gets a crush. Sneef and Sniff take on a jewel thief. Sally Cat goes on her first trip to visit her cousin Lily.
| 24 | 11 | "Grand Hotel" | Rowby Goren | May 10, 1995 |
| 24 | 11 | "Couscous on the Nile" | Don Arioli | May 10, 1995 |
| 24 | 11 | "Cat Family Ski Trip" | Joseph Mallozzi | May 10, 1995 |
Father Cat reviews the Busytown Grand Hotel. Couscous succeed another mystery taking place on a boat on the Nile River. The Cat Family goes skiing.
| 25 | 12 | "Lowly Breaks His Leg" | S.M. Molitor | May 17, 1995 |
| 25 | 12 | "Cucumber in Machuu Pichuu" | Rowby Goren | May 17, 1995 |
| 25 | 12 | "The Plight of Penelope Parakeet" | Rowby Goren | May 17, 1995 |
Lowly breaks his one leg and has to survive with being unable to use it. Cucumber saves a Machuu Pichuu mystery where all the costumes for a parade are stolen. Huckle and Lowly pet-sit Penelope Parakeet.
| 26 | 13 | "A Newspaper Mom" | Joseph Mallozzi | May 24, 1995 |
| 26 | 13 | "Cucumber in Rio" | S.M. Molitor | May 24, 1995 |
| 26 | 13 | "Donut Raffle" | Cliff MacGillivray | May 24, 1995 |
Mother cat gets a job for newspaper delivering. Cucumber captures a carnival in Rio. A Donut Raffle takes place in Busytown.

=== Season 3 (1995) ===
Every episode this season was directed by Marcos Da Silva.

| No. overall | No. in season | Title | Written by | Original release date |
|---|---|---|---|---|
| 27 | 1 | "The Knights of Busytown" | Ken Ross | May 31, 1995 |
| 27 | 1 | "Cave Pigs" | Joseph Mallozzi | May 31, 1995 |
| 27 | 1 | "Bucketman in Busytown" | Robert Browning | May 31, 1995 |
A game of The Knights of Busytown ends when Sally doesn't want to be the maiden in distress. The life of cave pigs is featured. Mr. Frumble gets stuck in a painted garbage can.
| 28 | 2 | "Billy Dog Gets Glasses" | Don Arioli | June 7, 1995 |
| 28 | 2 | "Cordelia's Debut" | Stephen Ashton | June 7, 1995 |
| 28 | 2 | "Lowly Joins the Circus" | Rowby Goren | June 7, 1995 |
Billy Dog gets his first pair of glasses. In the Shakespearean era, Cordelia dreams of becoming an actress. Lowly Worm takes part in a circus.
| 29 | 3 | "The Big Dare" | Bruce Robb | June 14, 1995 |
| 29 | 3 | "Oliver's Sandwich" | Joseph Mallozzi | June 14, 1995 |
| 29 | 3 | "Pig Will Won't" | Patrick Granleese | June 14, 1995 |
Billy Dog claims he's not scared of ghosts. Oliver is a clumsy butler. Pig Will becomes Pig Won't.
| 30 | 4 | "The Best Birthday Party Ever" | Rowby Goren | June 21, 1995 |
| 30 | 4 | "Martha's First Book" | Rowby Goren | June 21, 1995 |
| 30 | 4 | "Locked Out" | Cliff MacGillivray | June 21, 1995 |
Two simultaneous birthday parties take place in Busytown. In an era where books are printed by hand, Martha reads her first book while witnessing the invention of the printing press. Mr. Frumble gets locked out of his house.
| 31 | 5 | "Dad's Neat Job" | Brian Cameron Fuld | June 28, 1995 |
| 31 | 5 | "The Discovery of America" | Cliff MacGillivray | June 28, 1995 |
| 31 | 5 | "Mr. Gronkle's Friends" | Mary Perchanok | June 28, 1995 |
Father Cat does a new job. The story of America being discovered by Admiral Columoose is featured. Mr. Gronkle's friends are introduced to his mom.
| 32 | 6 | "Denys at Camp" | Morton Ritts & Fern Miller | July 5, 1995 |
| 32 | 6 | "Peasant Pig's Gifts" | Joseph Mallozzi | July 5, 1995 |
| 32 | 6 | "Little Fixit" | Thomas LaPierre | July 5, 1995 |
Denys go to camp. Piggy Origami's granddaughter wants a wedding with origami. Little Fixit, the child of Mr. and Mrs. Fixit is introduced.
| 33 | 7 | "The School Dance" | Thomas LaPierre | July 12, 1995 |
| 33 | 7 | "The First Olympics" | Rick Jones | July 12, 1995 |
| 33 | 7 | "Hilda for President" | Nicole Keefler | July 12, 1995 |
Hilda plans a school dance. The story of the Greek Olympics is featured. Hilda runs for president against Billy Dog.
| 34 | 8 | "Mr. Frumble's Brother" | Bruce Robb | July 19, 1995 |
| 34 | 8 | "Viking Pigs" | Joseph Mallozzi | July 19, 1995 |
| 34 | 8 | "The Perfect Wedding" | Mary Perchanok | July 19, 1995 |
Mr. Frumble's twin brother goes searching for him. Pig Pigson's crew is unenthusiastic. Miss Honey and Bruno Bear are getting married.
| 35 | 9 | "A Tough Test" | Morton Ritts & Fern Miller | July 26, 1995 |
| 35 | 9 | "The First Pyramid" | S.M. Molitor | July 26, 1995 |
| 35 | 9 | "The Big Date" | Joseph Mallozzi | July 26, 1995 |
Mr. Tough substitutes for the class. Imhotep builds the first pyramid but neglects his son. Billy's mother goes on a date.
| 36 | 10 | "Inventor of the Year" | Cliff MacGillivray | August 2, 1995 |
| 36 | 10 | "Macaroni Polo" | Ken Ross | August 2, 1995 |
| 36 | 10 | "Lone Wolf at the Lighthouse" | Stephen Ashton | August 2, 1995 |
Huckle is inspired to become an inventor. Macaroni Polo goes to China. Lone Wolfe grumpily guards a lighthouse.
| 37 | 11 | "Fun-Time Riddle Race" | Matthew Cope | August 9, 1995 |
| 37 | 11 | "The First Balloon" | Thomas LaPierre | August 9, 1995 |
| 37 | 11 | "Billy Dog's Space Rock" | Thor Bishopric & Todd Swift | August 9, 1995 |
A big riddle race takes place in Busytown starting at the Fire station (with the riddle "When things get really hot, we'll bring you some water") and ending at the Observatory (with the riddle "When it gets dark, look up and watch the show"). The story of the first balloon (a.k.a. Montgolfier) is featured. Billy Dog loses a meteorite from the observatory and tries to find and return it.
| 38 | 12 | "The Best Amusement Park Ever" | Rick Jones | August 16, 1995 |
| 38 | 12 | "The First Bridge" | Joseph Mallozzi | August 16, 1995 |
| 38 | 12 | "Say Cheese, Please!" | Thomas LaPierre | August 16, 1995 |
Wolfgang, Benny and Harry open a big amusement park, but have trouble in the process. The cave pigs create the first bridge. The class has to take photos of their families, but experience many problems and Huckle finally succeeds in taking the best picture.
| 39 | 13 | "Has Anyone Seen My Book?" | Cliff MacGillivray | August 23, 1995 |
| 39 | 13 | "P.J. Pig's Brave Day" | Thomas LaPierre | August 23, 1995 |
| 39 | 13 | "Vanderbuilt's New Shoes" | Brian Cameron Fuld | August 23, 1995 |
Sally's book goes missing. P.J. Pig tries to be a knight. Mr. Gronkle's nephew Vanderbuilt fails the soccer team.

=== Season 4 (1995) ===
Every episode this season was directed by Marcos Da Silva.

| No. overall | No. in season | Title | Written by | Original release date |
|---|---|---|---|---|
| 40 | 1 | "The Perfect Gentleman" | Nicole Keefler | August 30, 1995 |
| 40 | 1 | "The Best Painter Ever" | Joseph Mallozzi | August 30, 1995 |
| 40 | 1 | "The Best Day for Dennis" | Bruce Robb | August 30, 1995 |
Hilda's friend Rita comes to babysit. Michael Antelope paints the Sistine Chapel. Dennis has his best day.
| 41 | 2 | "A Trip Back in Time" | Thomas La Pierre | September 6, 1995 |
| 41 | 2 | "Home Sweet Home" | Joseph Mallozzi | September 6, 1995 |
| 41 | 2 | "P.S. Pig's Special Friend" | Nicole Keefler | September 6, 1995 |
Mr. Fixit builds a time machine. Cavemen search for a cave for their friend. P.S. Pig wishes she got a letter too.
| 42 | 3 | "Mr. Fixit's Magnet Machine" | Thor Bishopric & Todd Swift | September 13, 1995 |
| 42 | 3 | "Sneef and Sniff at the Opera" | Joseph Mallozzi | September 13, 1995 |
| 42 | 3 | "Mr. Gronkle Won't Mind" | Ken Ross | September 13, 1995 |
Mr. Fixit causes havoc with his new magnet machine that gets out of control and attracts anything made of metal. Sniff and Sneef solve a voice problem at a European Opera. An eventful day occurs in the lives of Lowly, Huckle, and Father Cat.
| 43 | 4 | "Peter's Visit" | Stephen Ashton | September 20, 1995 |
| 43 | 4 | "The First Skis Ever" | Thomas LaPierre | September 20, 1995 |
| 43 | 4 | "Stage Fright" | Ken Ross | September 20, 1995 |
Sally has an imaginary friend Peter. Bernard is too little to help his big brother. Dennis gets stage fright at a public speaking contest.
| 44 | 5 | "End of the Rainbow" | Bruce Robb | September 27, 1995 |
| 44 | 5 | "A Signal for Peng" | Cliff MacGillivray | September 27, 1995 |
| 44 | 5 | "Mr. Frumble's Birthday Party" | Caroline Maria | September 27, 1995 |
The class loves a story about a pot of gold at the end of the rainbow. Peng's wife has a baby when he gets a job at the Great Wall of China. Mr. Frumble forgets his own birthday party.
| 45 | 6 | "Bananas the Magician" | Anne-Marie Perrotta | October 4, 1995 |
| 45 | 6 | "The First Horseless Carriage" | Thomas LaPierre | October 4, 1995 |
| 45 | 6 | "Princess Hilda" | Stephen Ashton | October 4, 1995 |
Bananas Gorilla acts as a magician. The story of the first horseless carriage is featured. Hilda acts as a princess.
| 46 | 7 | "Daylight Savings Time" | Matthew Cope | October 11, 1995 |
| 46 | 7 | "Eager Beaver's Clever Game" | Stephen Ashton | October 11, 1995 |
| 46 | 7 | "The Pickle Car Wash" | Cliff MacGillivray | October 11, 1995 |
A clock tower gets stuck during Daylight Saving Time. Eager Beaver makes a clever game. Mr. Frumble has his own car wash for his Pickle Car.
| 47 | 8 | "Triple A Deliveries" | Gerry Capelle | October 18, 1995 |
| 47 | 8 | "Stanley's Amazing Photo" | Brian Cameron Fuld | October 18, 1995 |
| 47 | 8 | "Lost in the Swamp" | Joseph Mallozzi | October 18, 1995 |
Several deliveries take place. Stanley does some of the best photographing. Someone gets lost in the swamp.
| 48 | 9 | "Mr. Fixit's Super Submarine" | Thomas LaPierre | October 25, 1995 |
| 48 | 9 | "Cahuchu's Magic Tree" | Anne-Marie Perrotta | October 25, 1995 |
| 48 | 9 | "Mr. Bean's Restaurant" | Nicole Keefler | October 25, 1995 |
Mr. Fixit invents a submarine and Lowly and Huckle give it a test ride. Little Cahuchu discovers a tree with magical bouncing sap. Mr. Bean opens a drive-in restaurant but only serves beans.
| 49 | 10 | "Abe and Babe's Christmas Lesson" | Thomas LaPierre | November 1, 1995 |
| 49 | 10 | "Sally Cat's Christmas Dream" | Thomas LaPierre | November 1, 1995 |
| 49 | 10 | "The Best Christmas Present Ever" | Thomas LaPierre | November 1, 1995 |
The Cat family expects a baby on Christmas. Abe and Babe have been bad, so they get coal for Christmas. Sally Cat has a dream where Santa is in trouble.
| 50 | 11 | "The Best Car Trip Ever" | S.M. Molitor | November 8, 1995 |
| 50 | 11 | "Earnest's Dish You Can Eat" | Thomas LaPierre | November 8, 1995 |
| 50 | 11 | "Cousin Russ" | Rowby Goren | November 8, 1995 |
The Cat family goes on a big car trip to the beach. Earnest enters the best new dish contest. Cousin Russ moves from England to visit with Huckle in Busytown.
| 51 | 12 | "Fill'er Up Scotty" | Mary Perchanok | November 15, 1995 |
| 51 | 12 | "Niagara Falls Mystery" | Daniel Rendek | November 15, 1995 |
| 51 | 12 | "Helper's Helper" | Joseph Mallozzi | November 15, 1995 |
Scotty's tanker truck breaks down. Cucumber succeeds a mystery when Niagara Falls stops flowing and it is blocked by Beaver Sweet Tooth's gang. Deputy Flo gets another helper.
| 52 | 13 | "Who's Afraid of the Big Eclipse" | Brian Cameron Fuld | November 22, 1995 |
| 52 | 13 | "Hold Your Breath!" | Bruce Robb | November 22, 1995 |
| 52 | 13 | "Pumpkin Heads" | Mary Perchanok | November 22, 1995 |
When there is a misprint in The Bugle, the townspeople think that the sun will disappear for 360 years. Toula and her father catch a gold necklace in their net. Huckle, Lowly and Sprout participate in a pumpkin contest.

=== Season 5 (1996) ===
Every episode this season was directed by Nadja Cozic.

| No. overall | No. in season | Title | Written by | Original release date |
|---|---|---|---|---|
| 53 | 1 | "The Mole Machine" | S.M. Molitor | January 5, 1996 |
| 53 | 1 | "The Royal Game of Dennis" | Joseph Mallozzi | January 5, 1996 |
| 53 | 1 | "Now That's Progress" | Thomas LaPierre | January 5, 1996 |
Mr. Fixit invents a mole machine. Abbott Thomas's monk Dennis is unhappy. Mr. Gronkle decides to demolish his decaying castle.
| 54 | 2 | "Superstitious Bananas" | Anne-Marie Perrotta & Tean Schultz | January 12, 1996 |
| 54 | 2 | "Pépé le Gangstaire" | Thomas LaPierre | January 12, 1996 |
| 54 | 2 | "Drive-Through Movie" | Cliff MacGillivray | January 12, 1996 |
Bananas Gorilla thinks he's doomed to bad luck. Couscous is shocked that the dirty rats are being let out of jail. A drive-through theater opens.
| 55 | 3 | "King and Queen for a Day" | Nicole Keefler | January 19, 1996 |
| 55 | 3 | "The Piggy Express" | Joseph Mallozzi | January 19, 1996 |
| 55 | 3 | "Practice Makes Prefect" | Ken Ross | January 19, 1996 |
Huckle and Hilda become king and queen. Piggy delivers mail through stormy weather. There is a school recital and everyone's unhappy with their parts.
| 56 | 4 | "The Winners" | Thomas LaPierre | January 26, 1996 |
| 56 | 4 | "No More Games, Manuel!" | Thomas LaPierre | January 26, 1996 |
| 56 | 4 | "We Won't Go to the Doctor!" | Patrick Granleese | January 26, 1996 |
Busytown holds a race. Manuel plays jungle explorer. Pig Will and Pig Won't argue about the doctor.
| 57 | 5 | "Never Too Small" | Joseph Mallozzi | February 2, 1996 |
| 57 | 5 | "Albert, the Belgian Barge Captain" | Stephen Ashton | February 2, 1996 |
| 57 | 5 | "Rainy Day" | Rick Jones | February 2, 1996 |
Sally and Robbie are too small for basketball. There's a festival of giants in Belgium. Huckle, Lowly, and Sally are bored on a rainy day.
| 58 | 6 | "Mr. Gronkle Comes to Stay" | Thomas LaPierre | February 9, 1996 |
| 58 | 6 | "Leo-pardo's Smile" | Joseph Mallozzi | February 9, 1996 |
| 58 | 6 | "Blooming Busytown" | Anne-Marie Perrotta & Tean Schultz | February 9, 1996 |
Mr. Gronkle stays with the Cat family during winter, but freezes in the ice. Leo-pardo is an inventor genius but discovers his greatest innovation. Mr. Root plants flowers all over Busytown.
| 59 | 7 | "Match-Makers" | Thomas LaPierre | February 16, 1996 |
| 59 | 7 | "Forget-bur Never Forgets" | Thomas LaPierre | February 16, 1996 |
| 59 | 7 | "Toof Trouble" | Goldie Olszynko | February 16, 1996 |
Huckle plays matchmaker for Mr. Frumble. In Mesopotamia before writing was invented, royal architect Forget-bur tries to build a Ziggurat for the king but keeps forgetting his plans. Hilda has a toothache and is in denial.
| 60 | 8 | "The New Neighbors" | Joseph Mallozzi | February 23, 1996 |
| 60 | 8 | "The First Halloween Ever" | Thomas LaPierre | February 23, 1996 |
| 60 | 8 | "Now I Know My One, Two, Threes!" | Thomas LaPierre | February 23, 1996 |
A new neighbor moves into Busytown's spooky house. The story of the first Halloween is told. Sally learns how to count after realizing it's okay to ask for help.
| 61 | 9 | "Mr. Gronkle Moves Away" | Brian Cameron Fuld | March 1, 1996 |
| 61 | 9 | "Counting Chickens" | Stephen Ashton | March 1, 1996 |
| 61 | 9 | "The Spelling Bee" | Nicole Keefler | March 1, 1996 |
Mr. Gronkle moves to the quiet countryside. Before numbers were invented, a scribe must take inventory of an estate. Billy enters a spelling bee despite lacking confidence in his abilities.
| 62 | 10 | "Huckle's Feathery Friends" | Anne-Marie Perrotta & Tean Schultz | March 8, 1996 |
| 62 | 10 | "The First Valentine Ever" | Todd Swift & Thor Bishopric | March 8, 1996 |
| 62 | 10 | "The Sleepover" | Lynn Mason | March 8, 1996 |
Huckle knocks out a bird's nest. The first valentine is created. Dennis goes to Sprout's sleepover.
| 63 | 11 | "Count on Us!" | Rick Jones | March 15, 1996 |
| 63 | 11 | "The First Easter Egg Ever" | Ken Ross | March 15, 1996 |
| 63 | 11 | "Be My Valentine" | Caroline Maria & Joan Scott | March 15, 1996 |
There's a bikeathon in Busytown, but Billy needs a bike. A family is rescued by their kind king, and to thank him, the family promises to give the king a gift. It's Valentine's Day, and Hilda gets a little carried away.
| 64 | 12 | "The Mystery of the Stone Circle" | Bruce Robb | March 22, 1996 |
| 64 | 12 | "The Big Apple Christmas Caper" | Joseph Mallozzi | March 22, 1996 |
| 64 | 12 | "Who's too Scared to Masquerade?" | Sandeep Panesar | March 22, 1996 |
A substitute teacher takes the class to the Stone Circle. On Christmas someone tries to rob New York. Little kids are intimidated by a masquerade party.
| 65 | 13 | "A Message in a Bottle" | Daniel Rendek | March 29, 1996 |
| 65 | 13 | "Santa Needs Help!" | Thomas LaPierre | March 29, 1996 |
| 65 | 13 | "There Really is an Easter Bunny" | Mary Perchanok | March 29, 1996 |
While playing pirate, Huckle discovers a message in a bottle with an SOS message. Hilda writes a Christmas story. Everyone except Huckle and friends are excited for the Easter egg hunt.

== Cast ==
- Sonja Ball as Huckle Cat, additional voices
- Keith Knight as Lowly Worm, Harry Hyena, Snozzle, Able Baker Charlie, Soybean Goat, additional voices

=== Additional voices ===
The rest of the cast were listed under this in the end credits:

- Michael Caloz as Kenny Bear (late season 3), Vanderbuilt Gronkle, Robby Lion, Pig Will (season 5)
- Len Carlson as Mr. Frumble, Mr. Gronkle, Mayor Fox, additional voices
- Tara Charendoff as Lynnie Raccoon (season 5), Abe, additional voices
- William Colgate as additional voices
- Don Dickinson as additional voices
- Cathy Gallant as Hilda Hippo, P.S. Pig, Thump, Deputy Flo, additional voices
- Paulina Gillis as Pip Pip, additional voices (uncredited)
- Paul Haddad as additional voices
- Keith Hampshire as additional voices
- Julie Lemieux as Russ, additional voices
- Judy Marshak as Fiona Cat, additional voices
- Tara Meyer as Sally Cat, additional voices
- Jeremy Ratchford as Bananas Gorilla, additional voices
- Susan Roman as Cucumber, Professor Dog, April Rhino, Squirty Humperdink, additional voices (uncredited)
- Stuart Stone as Kenny Bear (seasons 1–3), Pig Will (seasons 1–3), Pig Won't, Manuel (uncredited)
- John Stocker as John Cat, Mr. Humperdink, Scotty Dog, Pedro, Wolfgang Wolf, additional voices
- Peter Wildman as Mr. Fixit, Rudolph von Flugel, Sniff, Pickles, additional voices
- Philip Williams as Sergeant Murphy, Bruno Bear, additional voices

== Home releases ==
On July 27, 2010, Mill Creek Entertainment released The Busy World of Richard Scarry: Every Day There's Something New on DVD in Region 1 (US only). This 3-disc set features the first 30 episodes of the series which includes bonus episodes of Busytown Mysteries, Wimzie's House and Simon in the Land of Chalk Drawings. On July 19, 2011, Mill Creek released The Busy World of Richard Scarry: Fun in Busytown!, a 4-disc set that features the remaining 35 episodes of the series which includes bonus episodes of Busytown Mysteries, Paddington, A Bunch of Munsch, Old MacDonald's Sing-a-Long Farm and The Country Mouse and the City Mouse Adventures.

On August 4, 2015, Mill Creek Entertainment released The Busy World of Richard Scarry - The Complete Series on DVD in Region 1 which includes bonus episodes of Busytown Mysteries, Wimzie's House and Simon in the Land of Chalk Drawings.

== Music ==
Most of the music was written by two composers. The theme song was written by Sara Zahn and composed by Milan Kymlicka, while the underscore was composed and conducted by Laurent Petitgirard and Steve Wener. Several other composers contributed to several educational shorts in the series.
