= Tanche family =

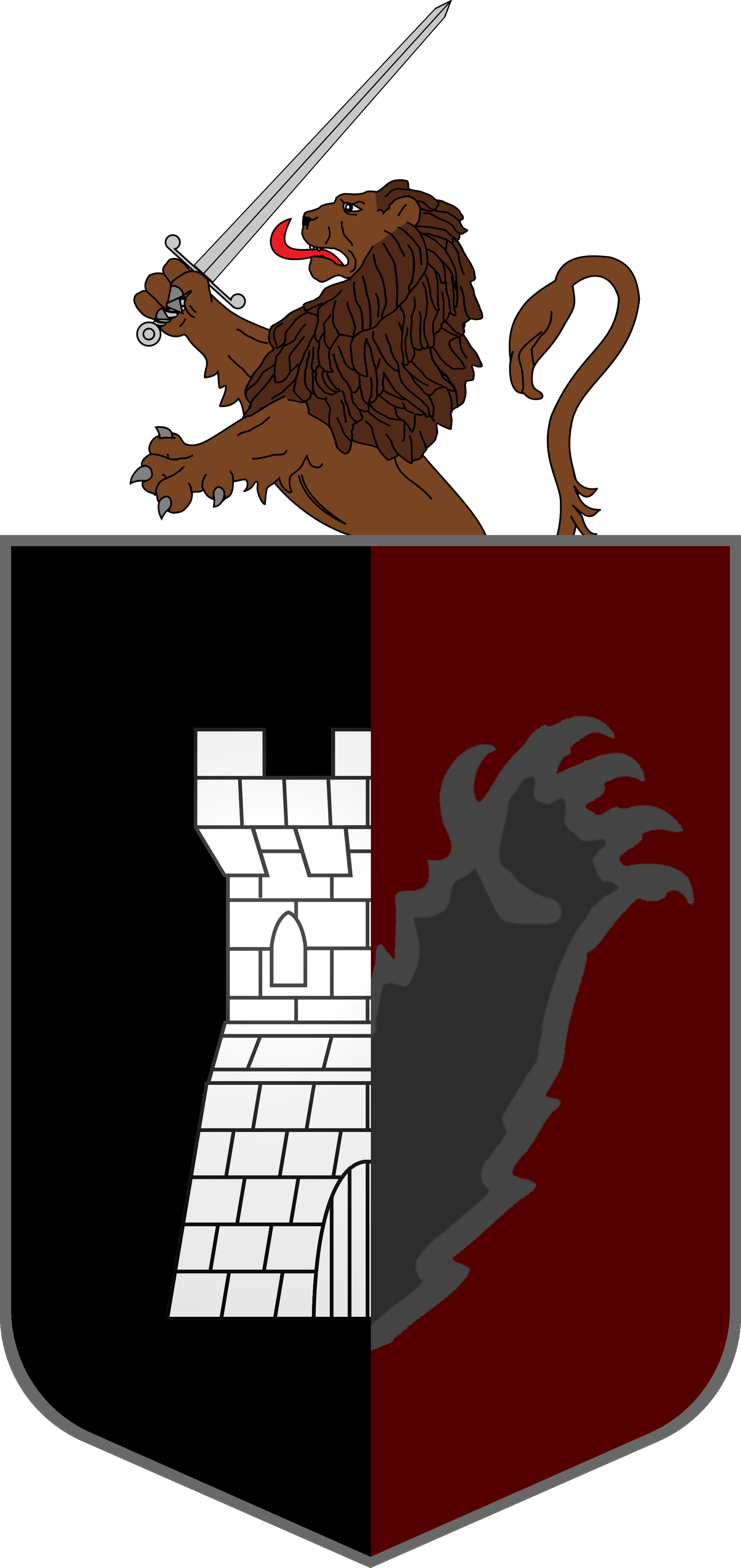
Coat of arms of the Tank family

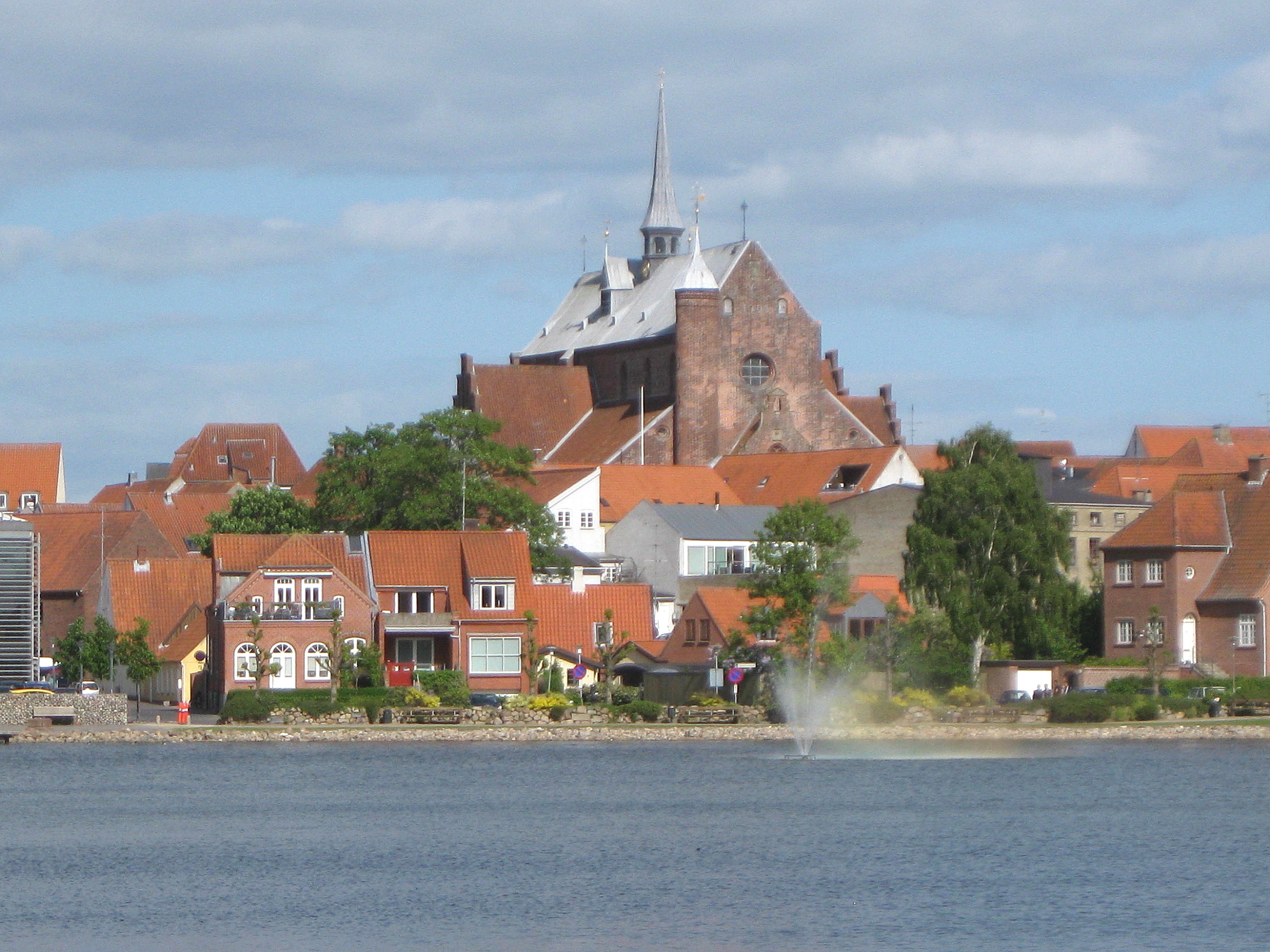
From Haderslev, Denmark. Photographer: Commons user Hubertus

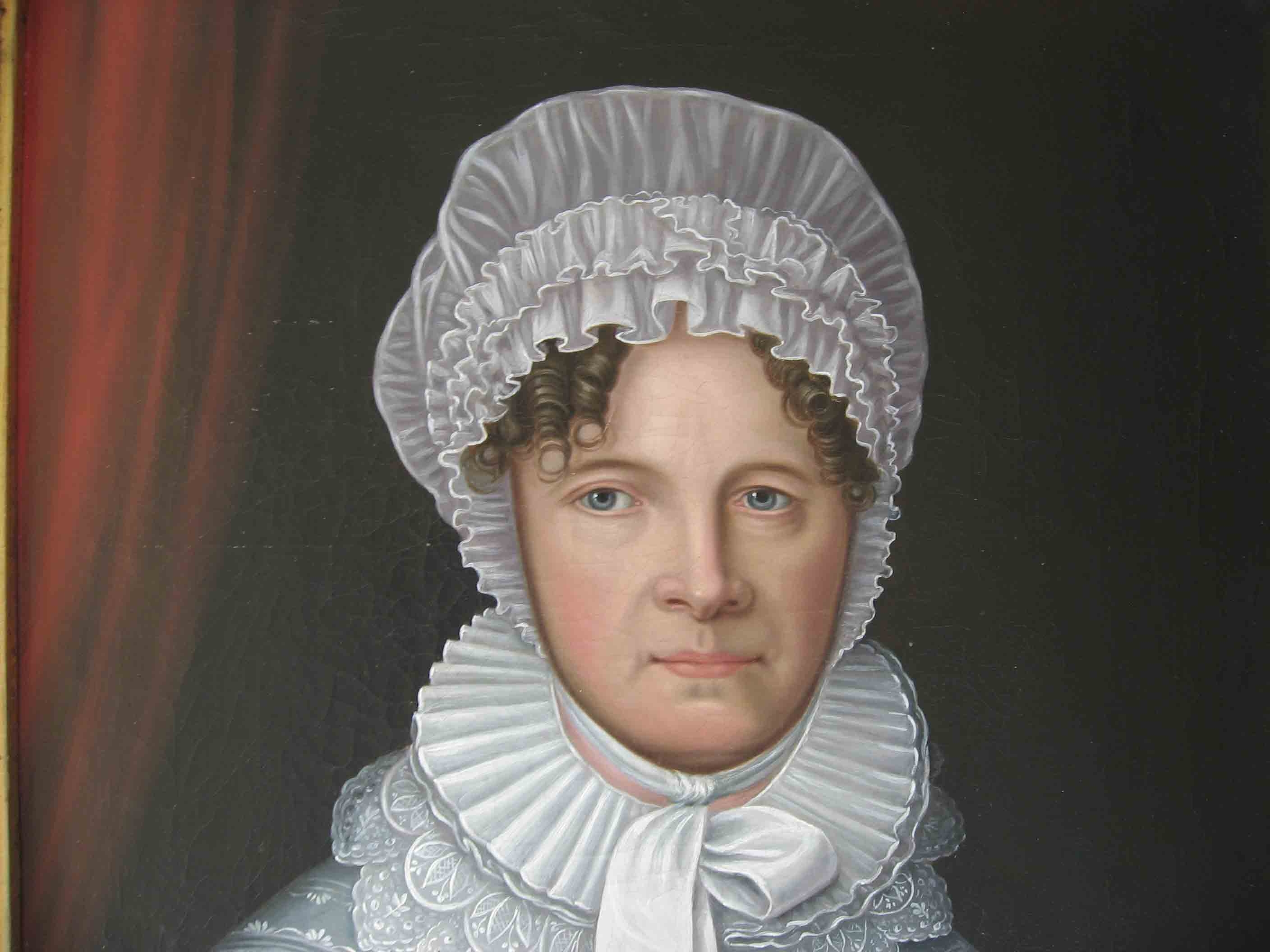
Catharine Tank, née von Cappelen, the wife of Carsten Tank. Unknown painter

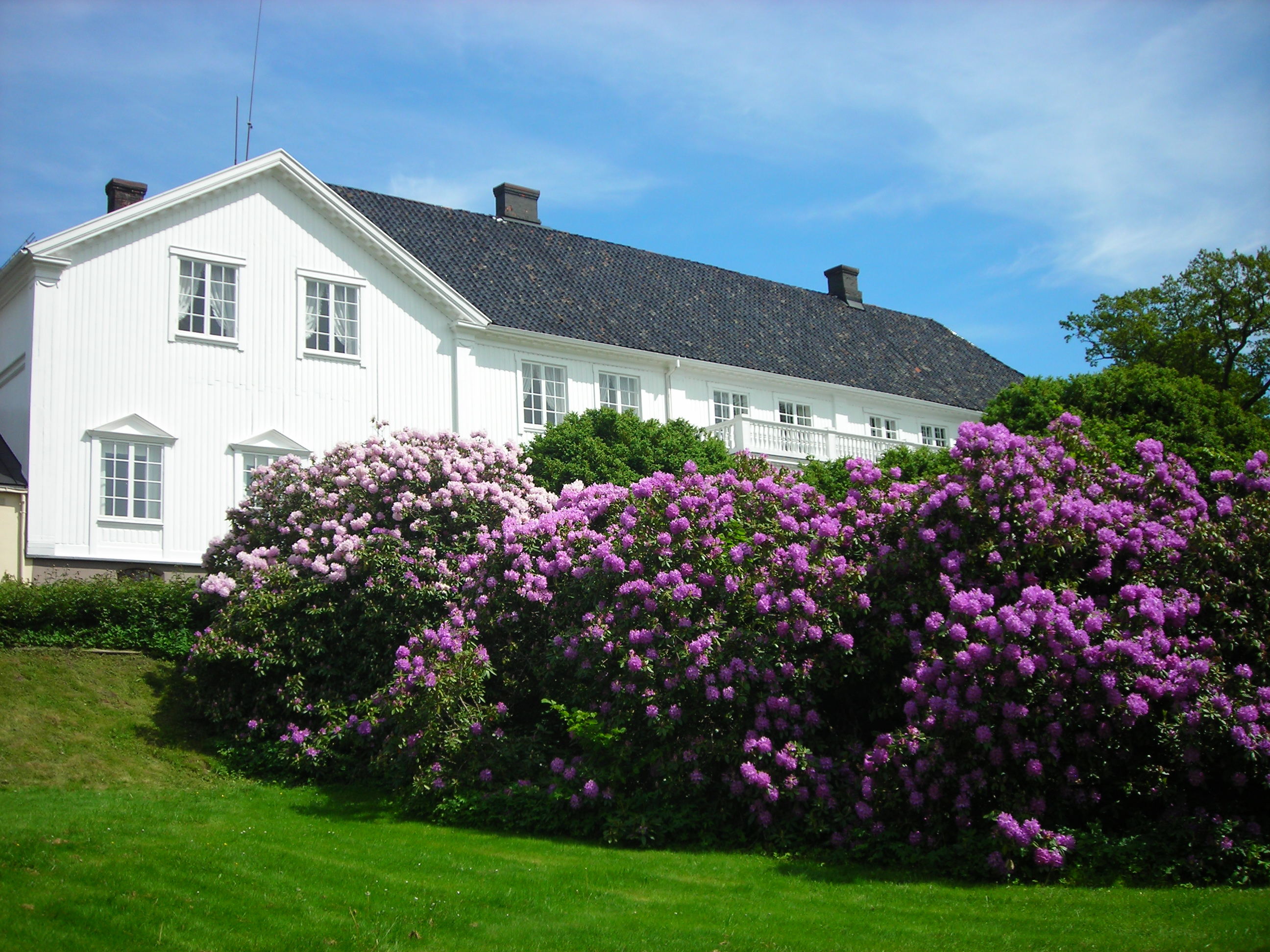
The manor house at Rød. Photographer: Commons user Bohuslen

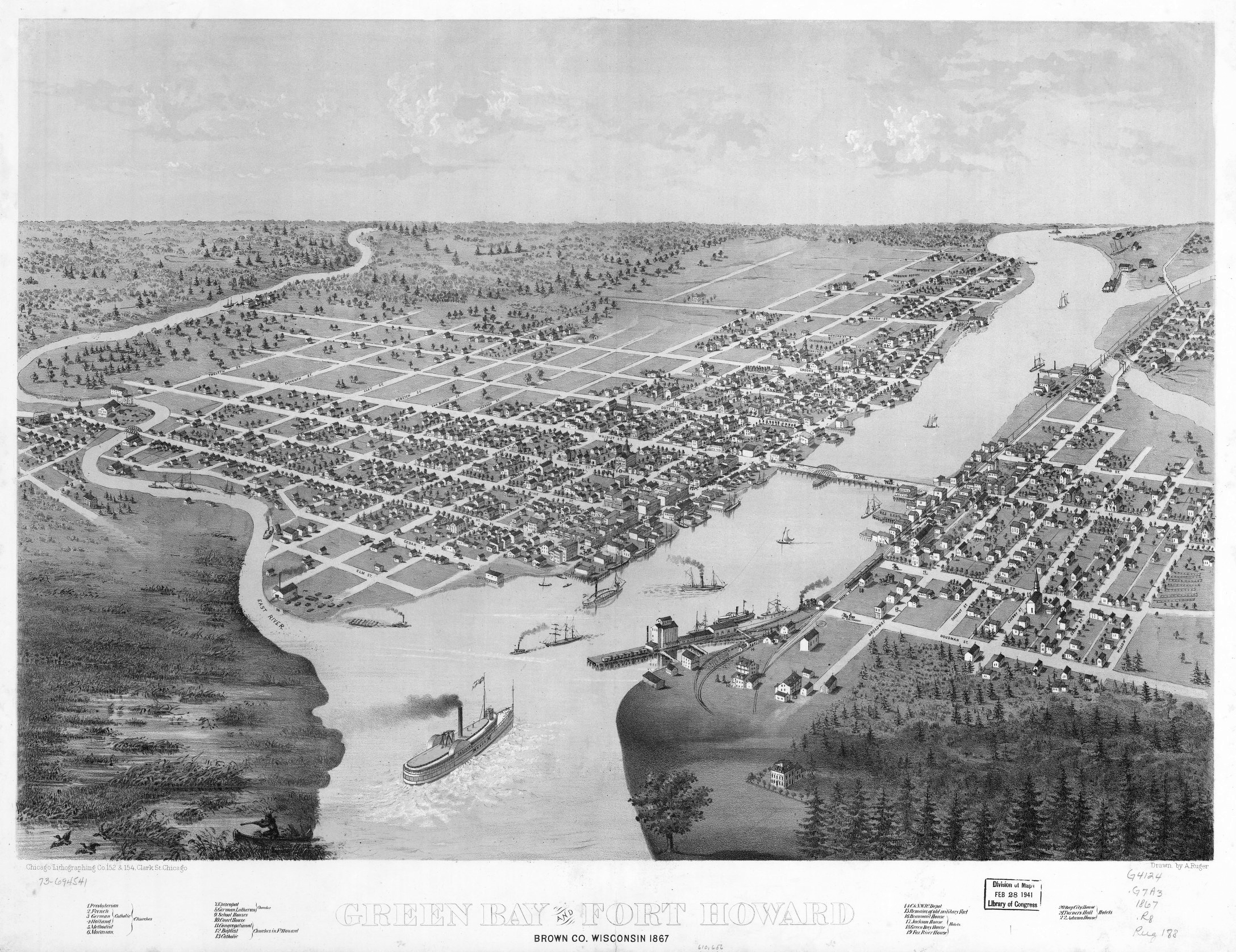
The family has played a significant rôle in Green Bay, where, for example, one finds Tank Elementary School. Map of 1867. Drawer: A. Ruger

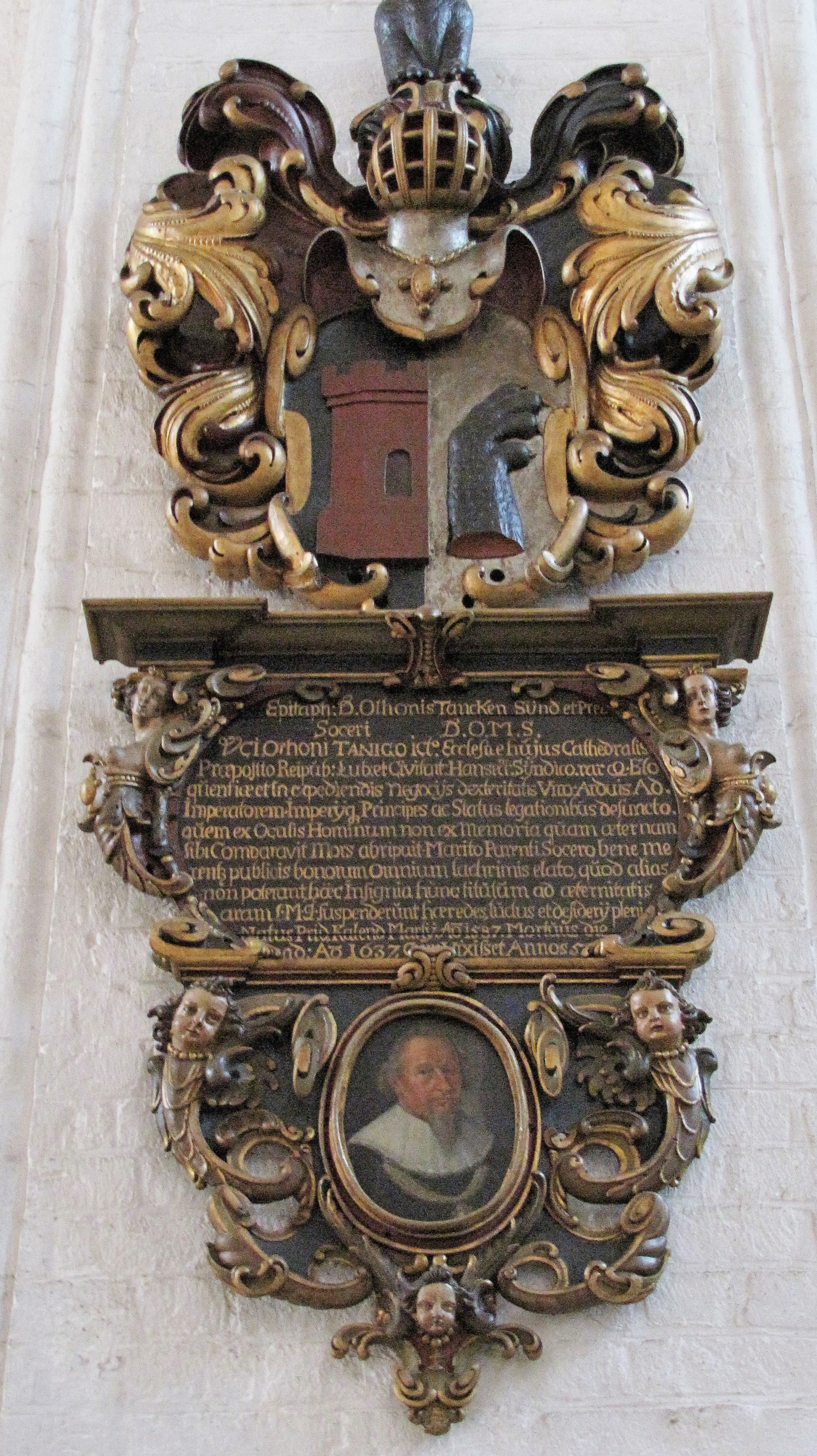
One of the family's coats of arms, with a portrait of Otto Tanck in Lübeck. Artist: Michael Conrad Hirt

The Tanche family or Tank (other spellings are Tanch, Tanke, Tanck, and Tancke) is the name of one or more Dano-Norwegian noble families of German origin. One of those lines is from Haderslev.

== History ==
There are several persons by the name Tanche and similar spellings in Denmark, Norway and Germany. The tradition says that a German by the name Tanche was ennobled by Charles IV of the Holy Roman Empire (reign: 1346–78). It is not known whether Martin Tanche, who was ennobled by the King of Denmark and Norway, belonged to the same families as the Norwegian families Tanche and Tank.

== Tanche in Denmark ==
=== Martin Tanche ===
Martin Tanche, since 1638 having been one of King Christian IV's officials, was on 23 October 1643 confirmed as a member of the combined Danish and Norwegian nobility, and he received as well a coat of arms.

Martin Tanche was the Danish Resident in the Hague. He was among the noblemen who participated at the 1660 meeting of the estates (Danish: stændermøde) in Copenhagen. At the end of his life, Tanche was Chamber Councillor for the Prince-elector of Saxony.

Letters patent of 1643

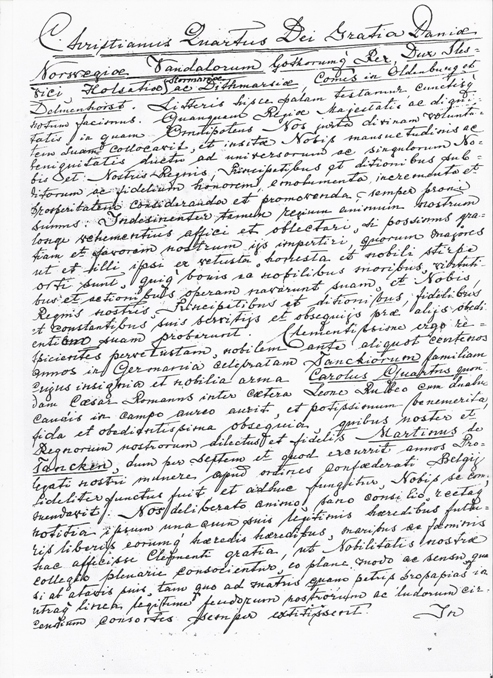
Pagina 1.

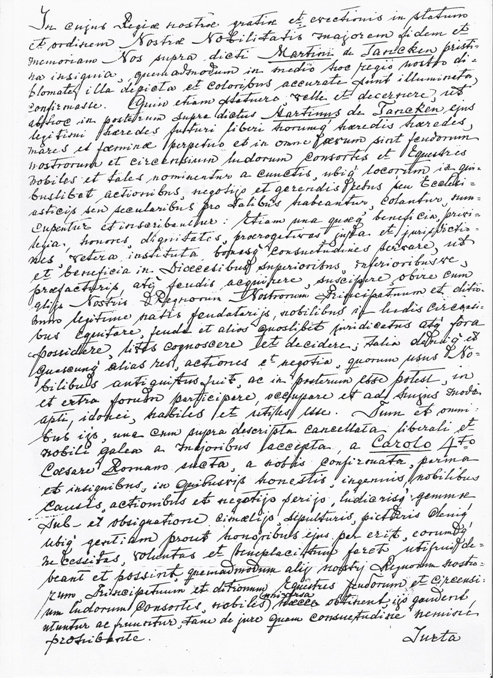
Pagina 2.

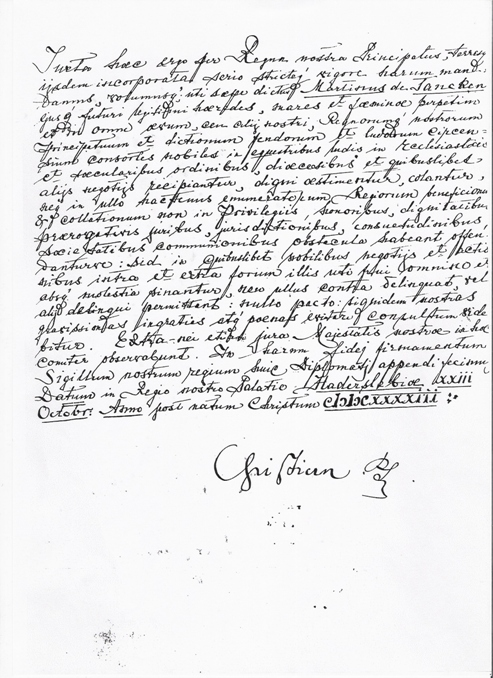
Pagina 3.

== Tanche in Norway ==
=== Tanche in Northern Norway ===
After having been the secretary of Christopher Knudsen Urne to Asmark, the Governor-general of Norway, Hans Carstensen Tanche was appointed as the district judge (Norwegian: sorenskriver) of Østerdalen and Solør. His son Niels Hansen Tanche moved to Northern Norway.

=== Tank in Eastern Norway ===
Niels Carstensen Tank or Tanche, who is claimed to be Hans Carstensen Tanche's brother, began as a merchant in Halden. Among his descendants are several noble families, e.g. Anker and the Counts of Wedel-Jarlsberg. His son was Carsten Tank the older, whose grandchildren among others were Carsten Tank the younger, who married (1) Bertha Sophie Leth and (2) Cathrine von Cappelen, and Anne Catharine Tank, who married Erik Ancher, together with whom she had the sons Peter Anker, a diplomat and a colonialist, and Carsten Tank Anker, a government minister and owner of the estate where the Constitution of Norway was signed in 1814. Norway's last count, Count Peder Anker of Wedel-Jarlsberg, was his descendant.

The Eastern Norwegian branch possessed, as a part of their big estate, the manor Rød, in Halden.

== Tank in the United States ==
Niels Otto Tank, the son of Carsten Tank and Cathrine née von Cappelen, was a missionary who first was in South America and later immigrated to Green Bay in Wisconsin. He had one daughter and no other descendants.

== Family names ==
Tanche was and is the name variant used in Denmark and Northern Norway. The family name is Tank in Eastern Norway.

== Family arms ==
There has been several different coats of arms used by persons and families by the name Tanche, Tancke and Tank.

The Danish coat of arms of Martin Tanche from 1643 shows in the first and the second field the castle and the bear's paw which are found in coats of arms used by the Tank family and by Otto Tanck in Lübeck. The third field shows a red, double-tailed lion rampant on a yellow background. The same lion is, bearing a noble coronet, also the crest. No family links are known from the Tank family in Norway to the Dane Martin Tanche or from him or Tank to the German Otto Tanck.

Carsten Tanche in Haderslev was in 1605, after his death, connected with a coat of arms which divided per pale shows the castle and the bear's paw. These arms as well as his wife Anna's arms appear on two chandeliers in the city's church, which in addition bear the following inscription:

CARSTEN TANCHE ANNA TANCHE ERBEN HABEN DIESE KRONEN GODT ZOEM EHREN DER KIRCHE ZUM ZIERATH HERRICHTEN LASSEN

=== Coats of arms ===
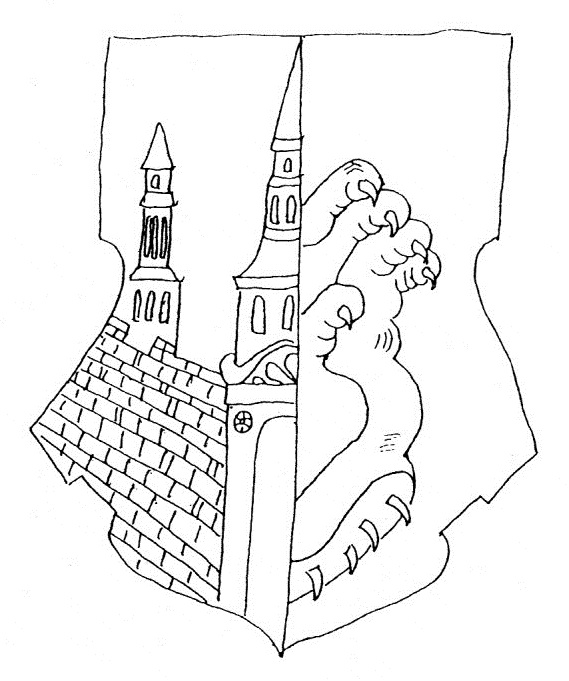
The in 1605 to Carsten Tanche in Haderslev attributed coat of arms.
Unknown drawer

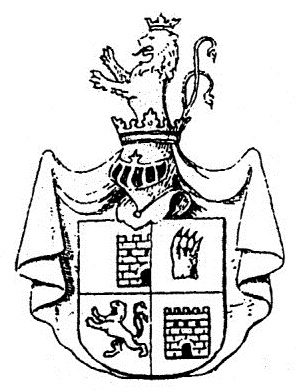
The in 1643 granted coat of arms of Martin Tanche.
Drawing in H. Storck: Dansk Vaabenbog, Copenhagen 1910

== See also ==
- Danish nobility
- Norwegian nobility

== Literature and sources ==
- A. Thiset og P.L. Wittrup: Nyt dansk Adelslexikon, Copenhagen 1904
- H. Storck: Dansk Vaabenbog, Copenhagen 1910
- Sven Tito Achen: Danske adelsvåbener, Copenhagen 1973
- Dansk Biografisk Lexikon: Tancke, Martin Digitalised version at Project Runeberg.
- Store norske leksikon: Carsten Tank, Carsten Tank – utdypning (NBL-artikkel)
- Store norske leksikon: Otto Tank, Otto Tank – utdypning (NBL-artikkel)
- Killough, Mary K., Ph.D.: The Tank Family of Green Bay, Wisconsin (1850–1891)
