= Anchor (disambiguation) =

An anchor is a device that attaches to the sea bottom to prevent a boat from drifting.

Anchor may also refer to:

== Devices ==
- Sea anchor, a device to slow the drift of a vessel without use of the seabed
- Earth anchor, a device to support structures, used in geotechnical and construction applications
- Anchor bolt, to attach objects or structures to concrete
- Anchor (climbing), used in rock climbing
- Anchor plate, to strengthen buildings
- Anchor, part of a microdermal implant in body modification
- Anchor escapement, a type of escapement used in pendulum clocks
- Screw anchor, to secure a screw in a brittle material
- Boat anchor (metaphor), a colloquial term for outdated equipment
- Digital anchor, uses GPS and electronic compass to hold a boat's position

== Places ==
- Anchor, Illinois, US
- Anchor, Kentucky, US
- Anchor, Shropshire, a village in England
- Anchor, Texas, US

=== Pubs and restaurants ===
- Anchor (New Haven bar), a bar and restaurant in downtown New Haven, Connecticut, United States
- The Anchor, Bankside, a pub in London, England
- Anchor Inn (Wheaton, Maryland), United States
- The Anchor, Birmingham, a pub in Birmingham, West Midlands, England

== Arts, entertainment, and media ==
=== Music ===
- Anchor (Autumn Hill album), 2015
- Anchor (Colton Dixon album), 2014
- Anchor (EP), by Birds of Tokyo, 2015
  - "Anchor" (Birds of Tokyo song), 2015
- Anchor (Trespassers William album), 1999
- "Anchor" (Cave In song), 2003
- Anchors (Will Hoge album), 2017
- Anchors, a 2013 album by I Am Empire
- "Anchor", a song by Lifehouse from Stanley Climbfall, 2002
- "Anchor", a song by Crossfade from Falling Away, 2006
- "Anchor", a song by Skillet from Victorious, 2019
- "Anchor", a 2015 song by Novo Amor
- "Anchor", a song by Hatchie from Liquorice, 2025

=== Film ===
- Anchor (film), a South Korean film

=== Other arts, entertainment, and media ===
- Anchor, a hammerhead shark character in Finding Nemo
- The Anchor (newspaper), a newspaper for the Rhode Island College campus
- Anchor Bible Series
- Anchor Monument (Matveev Kurgan), Russia
- Anchor, an electronic captions system that BBC Television used in the 1970s and 1980s
- News anchor, also known as a news presenter
- Plot anchor, a type of story-line plot device

== Brands and enterprises ==
- Anchor (brand), New Zealand dairy products
- Anchor (housing association), housing and care provider for older people, UK
- Anchor Books, an imprint of Random House
- Anchor Brewing Company and Anchor Distilling Co., an American alcoholic beverage producer
- Anchor Electricals Pvt. Ltd., an Indian electrical device manufacturing subsidiary of Panasonic
- Anchor Hocking, glass company
- Anchor Records, a record label
- Anchor Stone Blocks, a brand of German stone blocks

== Other uses ==
- Anchor baby, a term for a child born in the US to undocumented immigrants or other non-citizens
- Anchor leg, the final runner in a track relay race
- Anchor tenant, a significant retail outlet within a shopping mall
- Anchor telephone exchange, an underground telephone exchange in England
- HTML anchor, the source and destination of a web hyperlink, specified by the <a> HTML element
- Reserve currency, or anchor currency

== See also ==
- Anchorage (disambiguation)
- Anchoring (cognitive bias), in psychology, sticking to a given reference point
- Anker (disambiguation)
