= Anchorage (disambiguation) =

Anchorage is the most populous city in the U.S. state of Alaska.

Anchorage may also refer to:

== Places ==
- Anchorage, Kentucky, a city in Northern Kentucky
- Anchorage, Texas, an unincorporated community
- Anchorage, Wisconsin, a ghost town
- The Anchorage, Rhode Island, a former census-designated place

== Arts, entertainment, and media ==
=== Songs ===
- "Anchorage" (song), a 1988 song by Michelle Shocked
- "anchorage", a song by Relient K from their 2000 self-titled album
- "Anchorage", a song by Surfer Blood from their 2010 album Astro Coast

== Transportation ==
- Anchorage (maritime), a location where a boat or other vessel lies at anchor
- Anchorage Depot, a train station in Anchorage, Alaska, US
- Anchorage tram stop, a station in Manchester, England, in the UK
- Anchorage-class dock landing ship, a U.S. series of ships

== Other uses ==
- Anchorage (orthodontics), a technique used in dentistry
- Anchorage Gateway, a residential skyscraper in Salford Quays, England
- Anchorage, the cell of an anchorite, a hermit-like medieval monk
- The Anchorage (Easton, Maryland), a home on the U.S. National Register of Historic Places
- Anchorage Capital Group, an American company
- Anchorage Capital Partners, an Australian company
- Anchorage, in a bridge: a massive block, usually made of concrete, that secures the ends of large cables in suspension bridges or cable-stayed bridges.

== See also ==
- Anchor (disambiguation)
