= Regulator Maria Monument =

World War II memorial in Rostov Oblast, Russia

Traffic Guard
- Traffic Guard Marusya
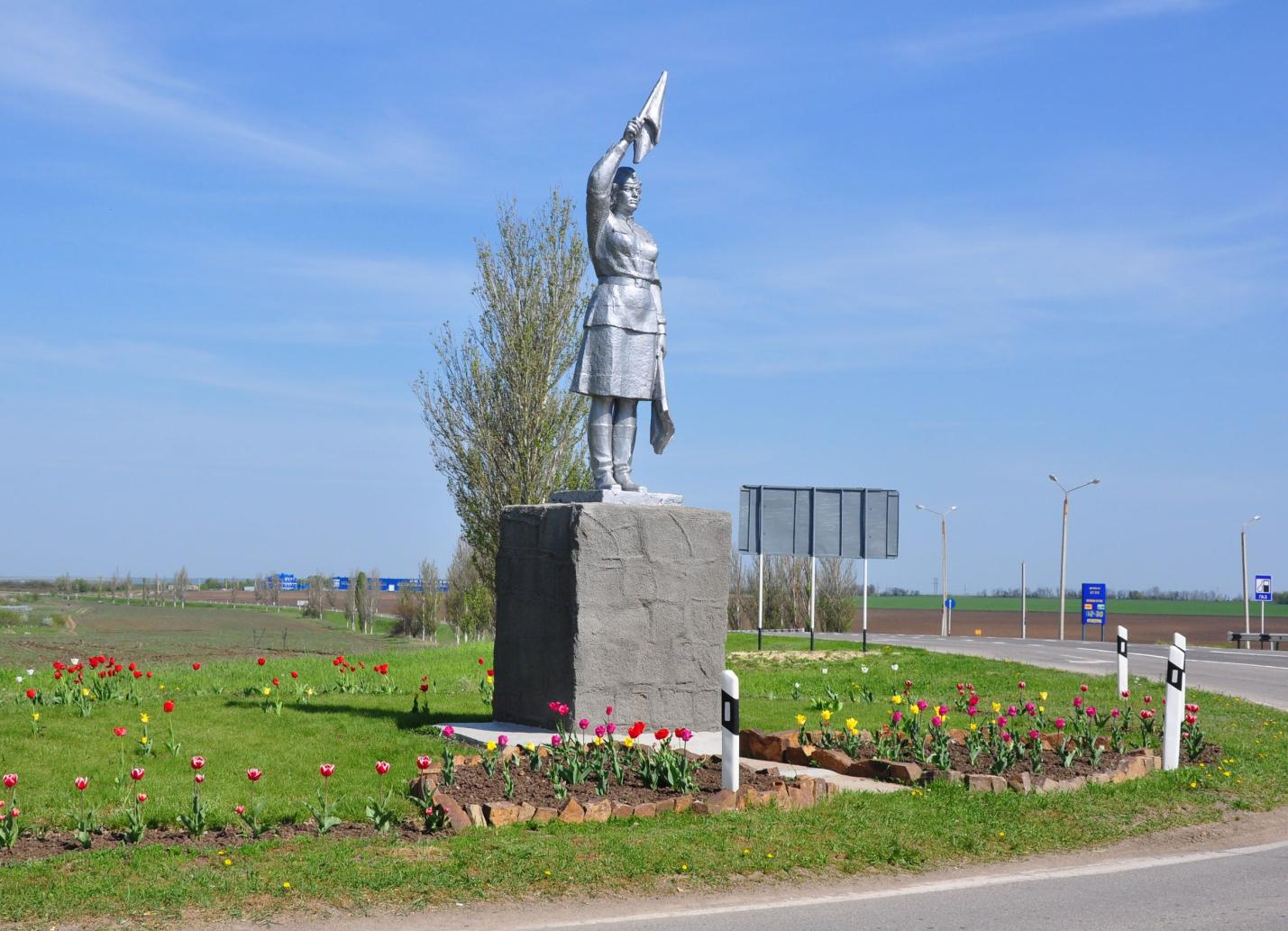
- Location: Matveev Kurgan, Rostov Oblast, Russia
- Height: 2.5 m (8 ft 2 in)
- Opening date: 1973

The Female Traffic Guard monument (Russian: Памятник военным регулировщицам), commonly known as Marusya or the Traffic Guard Marusya (Russian: Маруся-регулировщица), is a monument located near Matveev Kurgan in the southeastern part of Rostov Oblast. It pays tribute to Soviet female traffic guards of World War II.

== History ==
Matveev Kurgan district played a crucial role in the Donbas strategic offensive in 1943 and is home to a significant number of monuments that pay tribute to the soldiers who fought in World War II, known as the Great Patriotic War in Russia.

During World War II, the Soviet female traffic guards played a crucial role in managing traffic and ensuring the safe and efficient flow of military vehicles. These women were members of the Red Army traffic control units. Photographic evidence from the time shows Soviet traffic police women directing traffic at significant locations such as the Brandenburg Gate in Berlin, highlighting their active role in managing traffic during the war. They used signal flags and other means to regulate the movement of vehicles. Their contributions, along with those of other women in the Red Army, were instrumental in supporting the Soviet war machine and the eventual victory over the Axis powers.

== Monument ==
The statue features a young woman dressed in a military uniform signaling "May proceed."

The pedestal stands at a height of 1.5 meters, and the statue itself is 2.5 meters tall.

The monument was designed by V. I. Perfilov and was inaugurated on May 9, 1973.

== See also ==
- Women in World War II
- Maria Limanskaya
