= The Anchorage =

The Anchorage can refer to:

== Locations ==
- The Anchorage, Tanera Mòr, Scotland – a sheltered bay
- The Anchorage, Rhode Island – former census area

== Other uses ==
- The Anchorage, St George, Queensland, Australia – historic homestead
- The Anchorage, Sorrento, Victoria, Australia – historic homestead
- The Anchorage, Birmingham, England – an 'arts and crafts'-style house
- The Anchorage, Anchorage, Kentucky
- The Anchorage, Easton, Maryland – historic home
- The Anchorage, Montclair, New Jersey – historic home
- The Anchorage, Marietta, Ohio – historic home
- The Anchorage, Beaufort, South Carolina – historic home
- The Anchorage, Charlottesville, Virginia – historic home and farm complex
- The Anchorage, Kilmarnock, Virginia – historic home
- The Anchorage, Washington, D.C. – mixed commercial and residential building
