= Anker (name) =

Anker (cognate Ancher) is a given name of Danish, Faroese and Norwegian origin, sometimes used as a surname. Notable people with the name include:

== People with the given name ==
- Ancher Nelsen (1904–1992), American politician
- Anker Boye (born 1950), Danish politician
- Anker Engelund (1889–1961), Danish civil engineer
- Anker Jørgensen (1922–2016), Danish politician
- Anker Eli Petersen (born 1959), Faroese writer and artist
- Anker Rogstad (1925–1994), Norwegian criminal and writer
- Anker Smith (1759–1819), English engraver

== People with the surname ==
- Anna Ancher (1859–1935), Danish painter
- Albert Anker (1831–1910), Swiss painter
- Bernt Anker (1746–1805), Norwegian merchant, chamberlain and playwright
- Bernt Theodor Anker (1867–1943), Norwegian linguist, priest and author
- Carsten Anker (1747–1824), Norwegian politician
- Christian Anker (businessman) (1917–1988), Norwegian businessman
- Christian August Anker (1840–1912), Norwegian businessman
- Christian August Anker (1896–1982) (1896–1982), Norwegian businessman
- Conrad Anker (born 1962), American rock climber
- Ed Anker (born 1978), Dutch politician
- Ella Anker (1870–1958), Norwegian journalist
- Erik Anker (1903–1994), Norwegian olympic sailor
- Ferdinand Anker (1876–1954), Norwegian businessman
- Helen Anker (born 1972), English actress
- Herman Anker (1839–1896), Norwegian educationalist
- Irving Anker (1911–2000), American educator
- Johan Anker (1871–1940), Norwegian olympic sailor
- Johan Peter Andreas Anker (1838–1876), Danish military officer
- Kristian Anker (1848–1928), Danish Lutheran minister
- Lotte Anker (born 1958), Danish saxophone player
- Michael Ancher (1849–1927), Danish painter
- Nils Anker (1836–1893), Norwegian politician
- Nini Roll Anker (1873–1942), Norwegian novelist and playwright
- Peder Anker (1749–1824), Norwegian politician
- Peder Anker (historian) (born 1966), Norwegian historian
- Peter Anker (1744–1832), Norwegian diplomat and colonialist
- Peter Anker (art historian) (1927–2012), Norwegian art historian
- Peter Martin Anker (diplomat) (1903–1977), Norwegian diplomat
- Peter Martin Anker (politician) (1801–1863), Norwegian politician
- Matthias Joseph Anker (1771–1843), Austrian geologist
- Robert Anker (1946–2017), Dutch writer
- Øyvind Anker (1904–1989), Norwegian librarian

== See also ==
- Poul Anker Bech (1942–2009), Danish painter
- Anker (noble family)
- Ankers
- Anker (disambiguation)
