= Anker (disambiguation) =

Anker refers to the Chinese electronics manufacturer known as Anker Innovations Co., Ltd.

It may also refer to:

== People ==
- Anker (name), people with the given name or surname
- Anker (noble family)

== Places ==
- River Anker, in Warwickshire, England
- Anker Site, an archaeological site in Illinois, US

== Companies and brands ==
- Anker (automobile), manufactured in Germany
- Anker Beer, an Indonesian brand of pale lager
- AnkerDB, a BIM software company

== Measures ==
- Anker, an archaic unit of volume used in the Netherlands; see Dutch units of measurement § Volume
- Anker (unit), a unit of volume used in the US

== See also ==
- Anchor (disambiguation)
- Ankers
