= List of people from Great Falls, Virginia =

The following is a list of notable individuals who were born in and/or have lived in Great Falls, Virginia.

== Arts and entertainment ==
- Lauren Graham, Actress
- Del Ankers, cinematographer, director, and film producer
- Paula Cale, actress
- Kate Cordsen, photographer and contemporary artist
- Holly Twyford, actress

== Business ==
- Steve Case, founder of AOL
- Jacqueline Mars, Mars Candy heir
- Stephen L. Norris, co-founder of The Carlyle Group
- David Rubenstein, co-founder of The Carlyle Group

== Military ==
- Kenneth P. Moritsugu, former United States Public Health Service Surgeon General of the United States
- Sidney T. Weinstein, former United States Army lieutenant general

== Politics and government ==
- Elizabeth Moore Aubin, United States Ambassador to Algeria
- Bruce Bartlett, historian and government official
- Tony Blankley, political analyst and press secretary
- Brian S. Brown, political activist
- Louis Freeh, director of FBI
- Sung Kim, U.S. ambassador to the Philippines
- Peggy Noonan, author and columnist for The Wall Street Journal
- Barbara Olson, lawyer and television commentator killed in the September 11 attacks
- Theodore Olson, lawyer and former Solicitor General
- Reza Pahlavi, Crown Prince of Iran
- Bernard D. Rostker, former U.S. Department of Defense official
- Toby Roth, former member of the United States House of Representatives
- Rick Santorum, former United States senator and presidential candidate
- Mark D. Siljander, former member of the United States House of Representatives
- Stansfield Turner, former director of Central Intelligence and president of the Naval War College
- Glenn Youngkin, 74th governor of Virginia

== Sports ==
- Gilbert Arenas, professional basketball player formerly of the Washington Wizards
- Lee Evans III, former wide receiver
- Brendan Healy, former professional lacrosse player for the Washington Bayhawks
- Jacob Labovitz, soccer player
- Jimmy Lange, professional boxer
- Armin Mahbanoozadeh, figure skater
- Art Monk, former wide receiver for Washington Commanders
- Dan Snyder, former owner of Washington Commanders
- Jim Speros, former football coach and team owner
- Kate Ziegler, Olympic swimmer
