= Christian Anker =

Christian Anker may refer to:

- Christian Ancher (1711–1765), Norwegian merchant, timber trader and ship owner
- Christian Anker (businessman) (1917–1988), Norwegian businessman
- Christian August Anker (1840–1912), Norwegian industrialist
- Christian August Anker (1896–1982), Norwegian businessman in the paper industry
