= Zanker =

Zanker is a surname. Notable people with the surname include:

- Bill Zanker (born 1954), American entrepreneur
- Eden Zanker (born 1999), Australian rules footballer
- Graham Zanker (born 1947), Australian classicist
- Heinrich der Zänker (951–995), Bavarian Duke
- Paul Zanker (born 1937), German archaeologist

== See also ==
- Anker (name)
