= Ankers =

Ankers is a surname. Notable people with the surname include:

- Del Ankers (1916–2008), American cinematographer
- Evelyn Ankers (1918–1985), British-American actress
- Kathleen Ankers (1919–2001), American scenic designer

== See also ==
- Anker (name)
- Anker (disambiguation)
