= Kate Cordsen =

American photographer

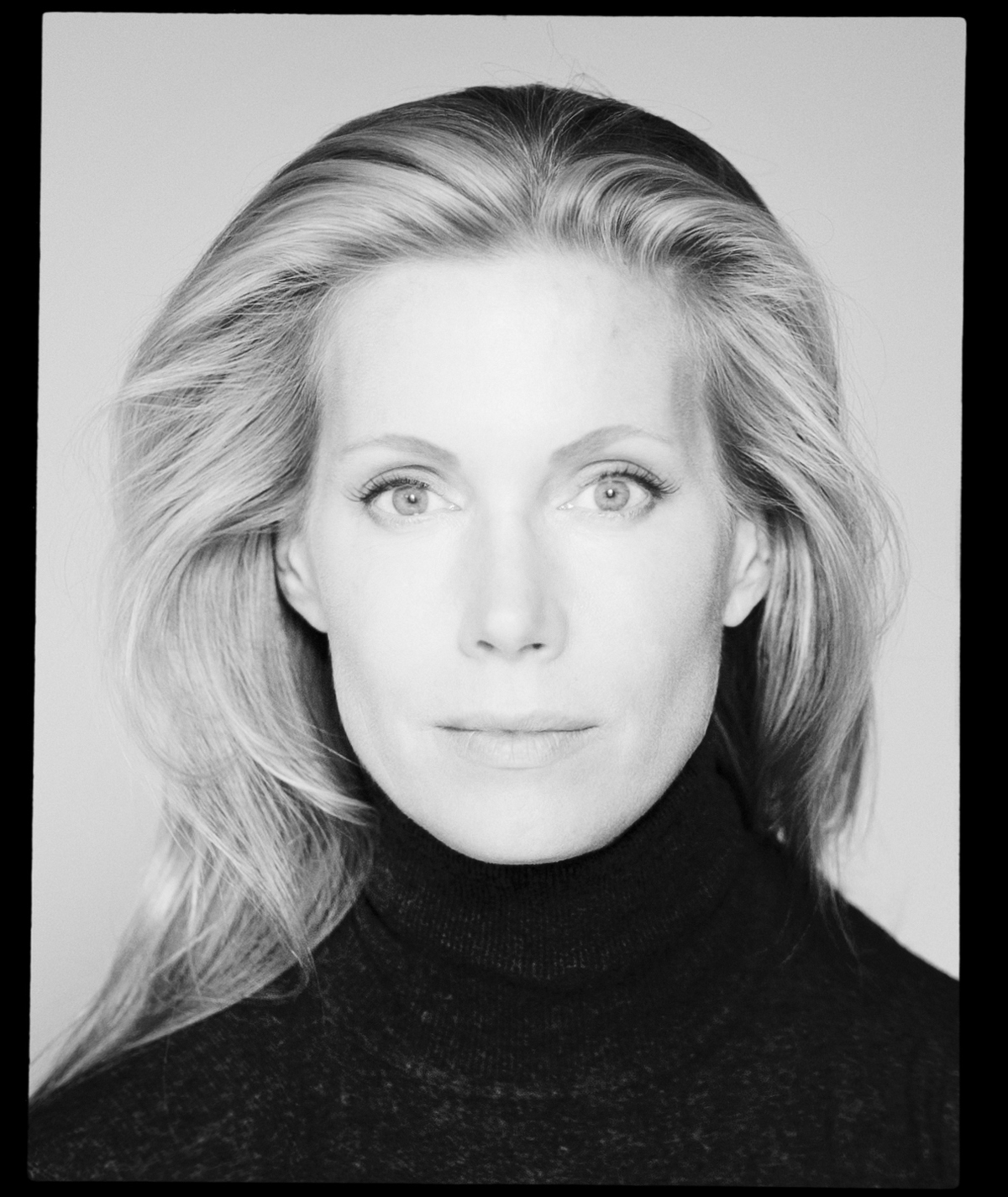
- Born: Kathleen Plante; 1966 (age 59–60); Great Falls, Virginia, United States
- Known for: Photography
- Spouse: John Richard Cordsen (m.1992; died 2016)

Kate Cordsen (born 1966, Great Falls, Virginia, United States) is an American photographer and film producer. Cordsen lives in New York City and maintains a studio in Sag Harbor, New York.

== Education ==
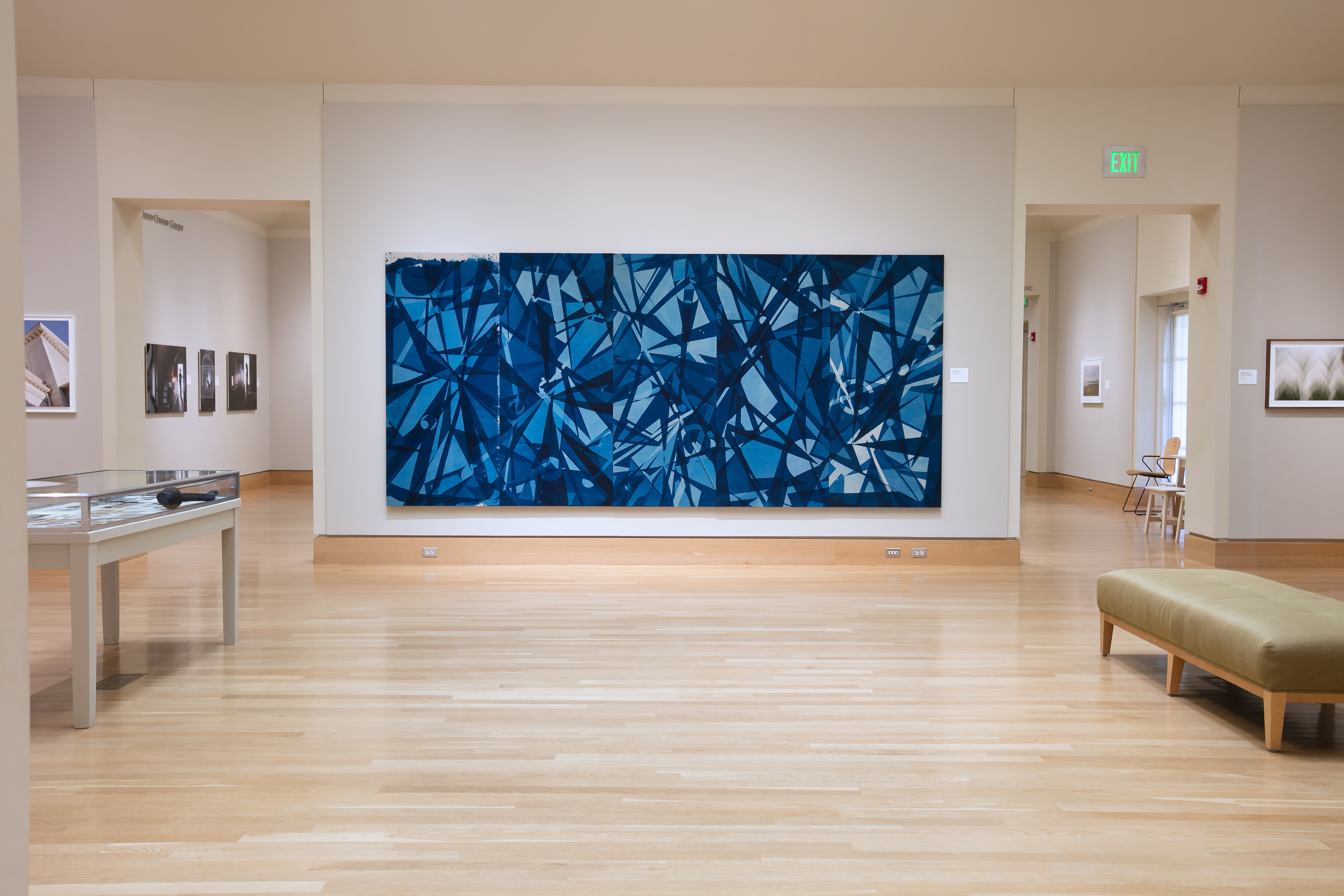
Cyanotype photogram at Florence Griswold Museum, 2016

Born Kathleen Plante, she was raised in Manila, the Philippines and Great Falls, Virginia. Her father was regional director of the Peace Corps in Asia, whose work took the family to Manila, offering a young Cordsen exposure to Asian cultures. Cordsen attended Langley High School in Mclean, Virginia. She received a BA in the history of art and East Asian Studies from Washington and Lee University, where she was the first woman in the university's history to receive an undergraduate degree. Cordsen has an MPP from Georgetown University and studied Chinese and Japanese Art History at Harvard University and photography at the International Center of Photography.

In the late 1980s, Kate Cordsen was represented by Ford Models. She worked closely with Japanese avant-garde artists Rei Kawakubo, Issey Miyake and Yohji Yamamoto, appearing on the runway and in print. Cordsen credits this time as a model as both the beginning of her education in photography and as formative in understanding Japanese aesthetics.

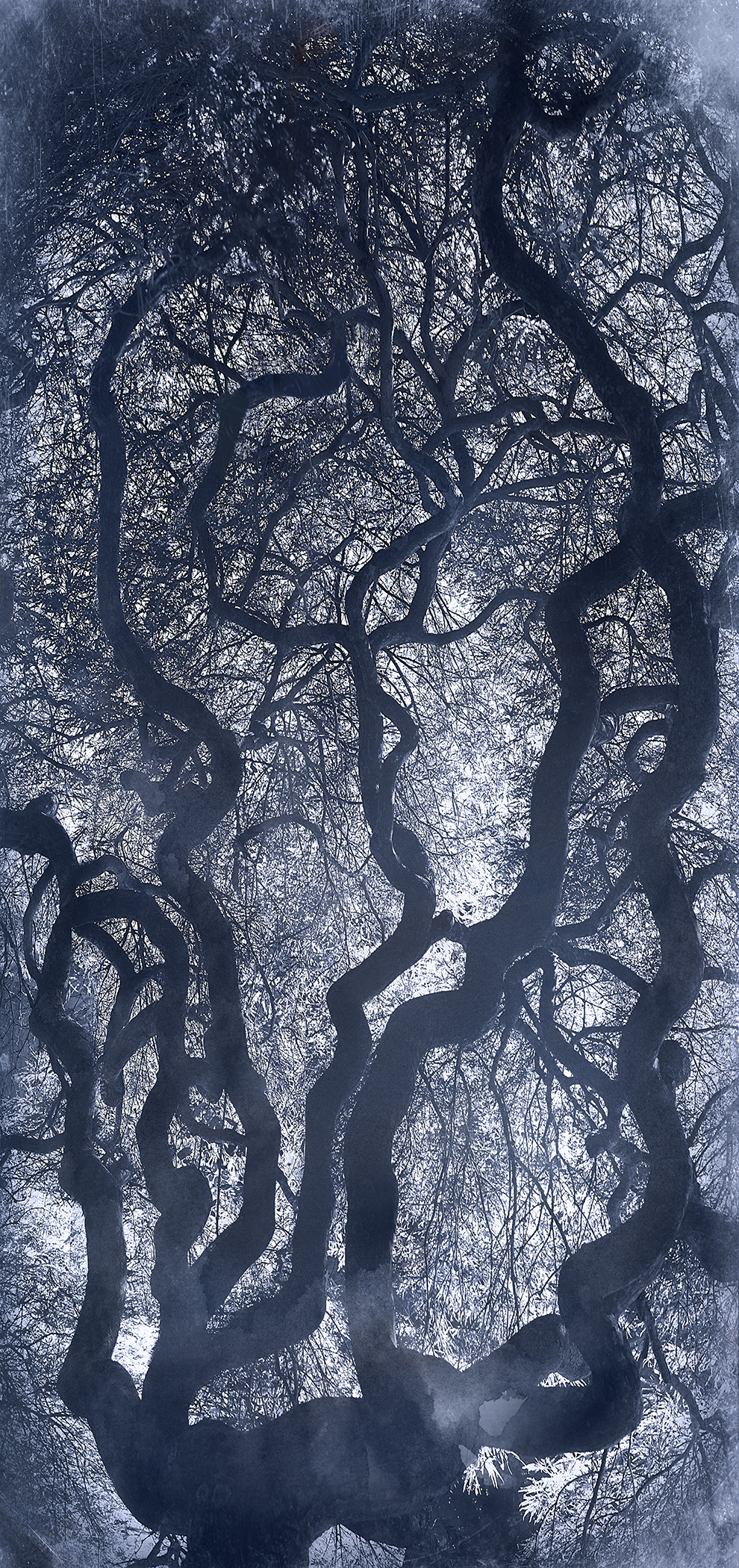
Indigo XII, cyanotype on handmade paper, 83 x 38 in, 2014

== Photography ==
Known for large format landscapes, Cordsen produces ethereal and ambiguous images that evoke ideas of fragmented memories and temporality. Her landscapes are, at first glance, simply meditative, but reveal impassioned and dramatic depths upon second and third looks. Cordsen combines 19th-century chemical processes, such as cyanotype, photograms, and gum bichromate, with traditional film exposures and digital refinements to produce works that bridge photography and painting. Cordsen is self-taught in darkroom techniques.

== Film ==
Cordsen executive-produced the documentary short film, Earth I Thank You, for The Garden Conservancy. The 37-minute film about Harlem Renaissance poet, Anne Spencer, traces the evolution of Spencer’s beloved garden from a personal retreat to a nationally significant cultural landscape. The garden was an oasis of creativity and a vibrant gathering place that became an important satellite of the Harlem Renaissance. The film had its world premiere in May 2025 at the Smithsonian’s National Museum of African American History and Culture and its New York premiere at the Frick Collection in January, 2026.

== See also ==
- List of photographers
- List of women photographers
- List of people from Great Falls, Virginia
- List of Harvard University people
- List of Georgetown University alumni
