= T-34 Tank Monument (Matveev Kurgan) =

Monument
- Monument "Tank T-34" Matveev Kurgan
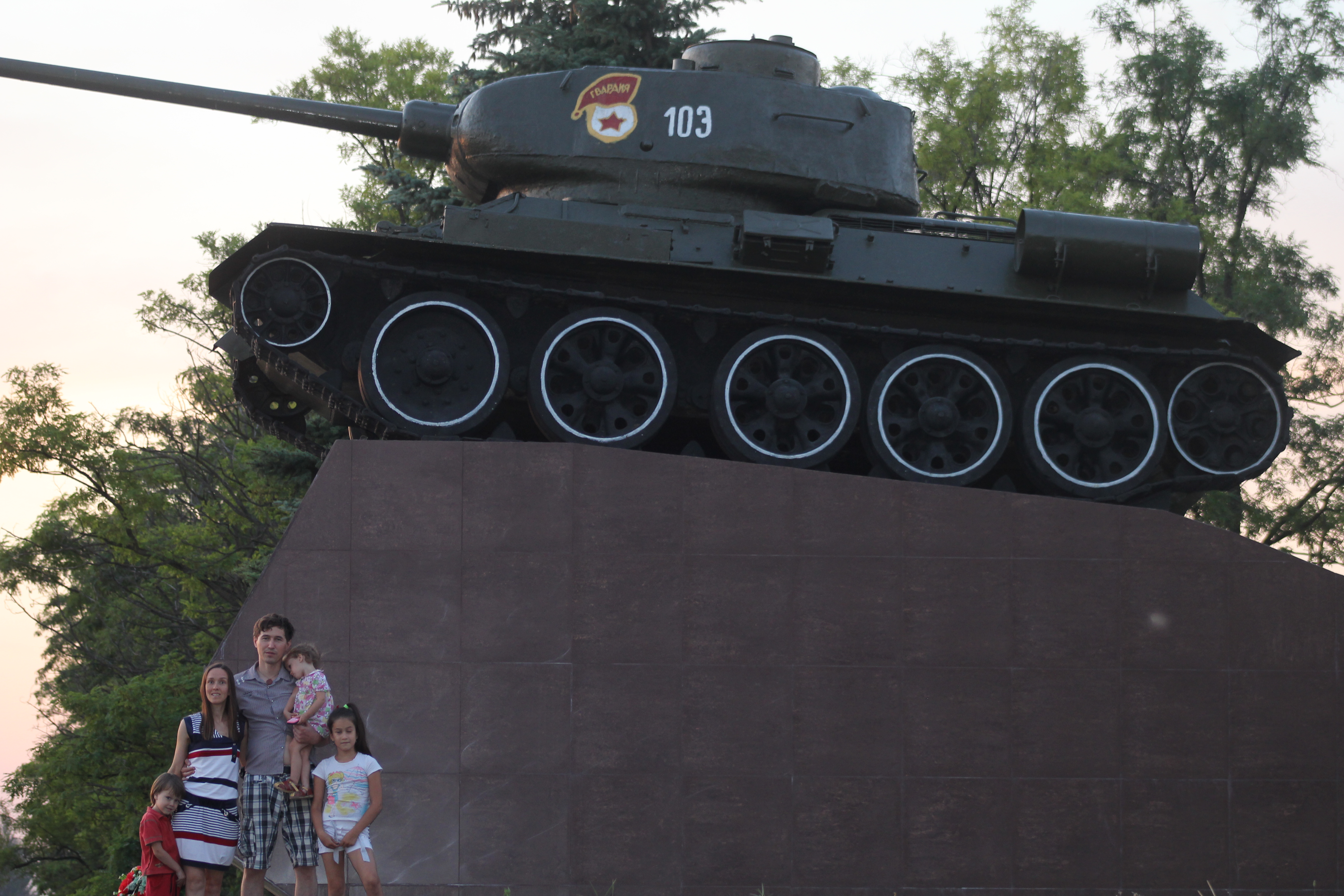
- Location: Matveev Kurgan, Rostov Oblast, Russia

The Monument "Tank T-34" Matveev Kurgan (Russian: Памятник "Танк Т-34" в Матвеев Кургане) is a Russian monument located near the village of Matveev Kurgan.

== History ==
On May 9, 1972 Tank T-34 was installed at the entrance to the settlement of Matveev Kurgan in honor of the 27th anniversary of the end of the Great Patriotic War in memory of the feat of the tankmen of the 44th Army that participated in the liberation of the village Matveev Kurgan in February 1943. After the defeat of the German troops at Stalingrad, the Soviet Army began the offensive in many directions. On February 14, 1943, the troops of the Southern Front liberated Rostov-on-Don. The task was to come to the river Mius by February 17, to occupy the district centre of Matveev Kurgan and the heights on the western bank of the Mius. Thus, the residents of Matveev Kurgan immortalized a feat of the Hero of the Soviet Union, lieutenant Alexander Matveevich Eroshin (he began his career as the commander of the tank T-34), the tank commander of the 37th Guards Tank Regiment, he was the first who at high speed broke into the night of February 17, 1943 on a tank in the village and started the battle for its liberation. Guard - Lieutenant Eroshin A.M. didn’t allow the enemy to blow up the railway bridge over the Oktyabrskaya street. The crew of the tank destroyed more than a company of the enemy in this battle. In 1968 Eroshin A.M. was given the title of "Honorary Citizen of the Settlement of Matveev Kurgan". Until his last days he kept in touch with residents of the district. Eroshin A.M. died in May 2003. He was buried in Moscow.

Description of the monument: the pedestal of the monument is made of stone. The original T-34 tank is installed there. The tank (with a tankman in it) drove up on the pedestal itself.

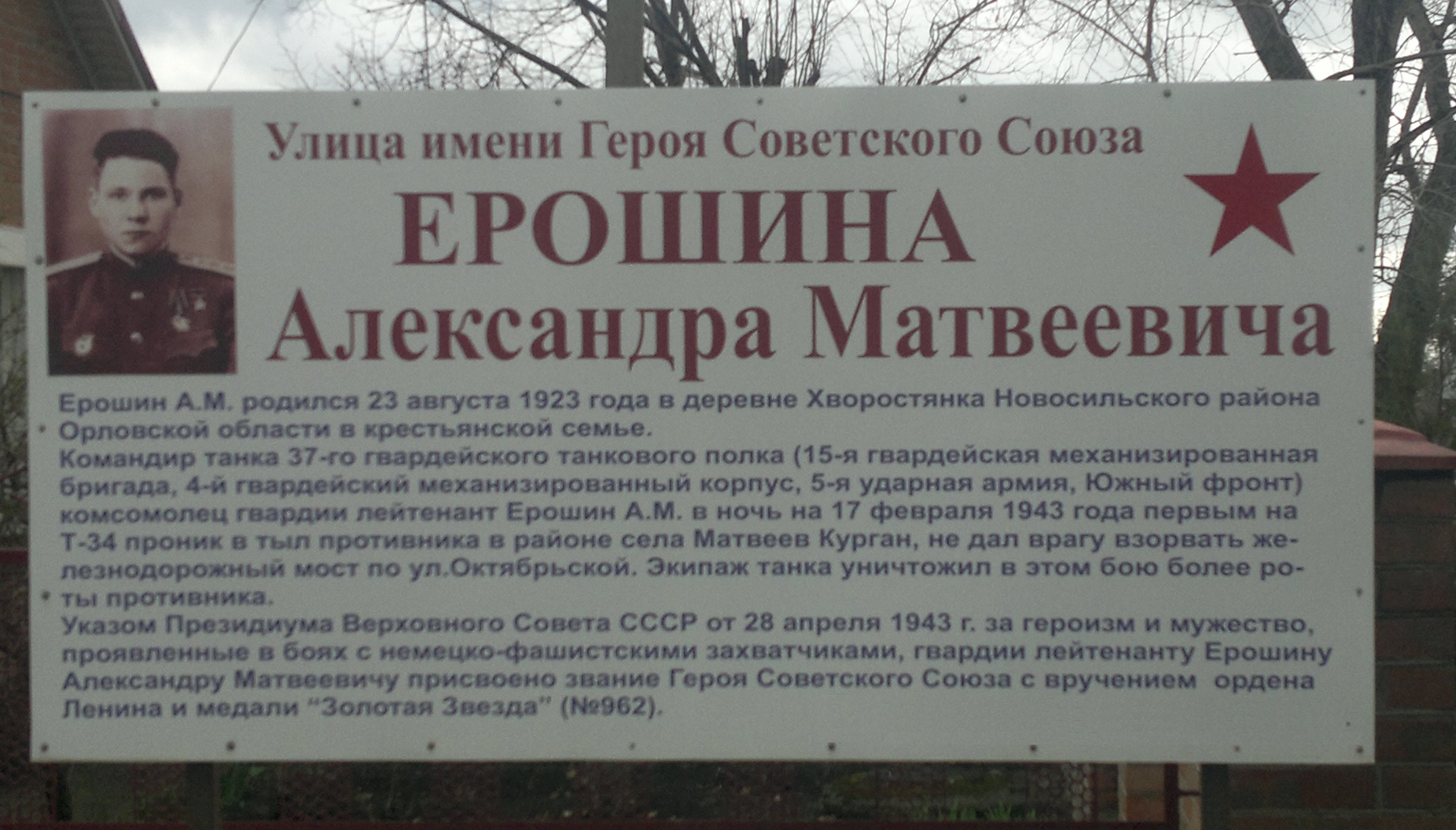
The street named after Eroshin

== Sources ==
- "Monuments of military glory of Matveevo-Kurgan district" brief tourist information on the tourist route; L.A.Esina; 2016
- Pugaev G.K. Years and people. Historical records; Taganrog, 2010, 212 p.
- Pugaev G.K. Blood and glory of the Mius; Taganrog, 1988, 208 p.
