= Matveyev Kurgan =

Rural locality in Rostov Oblast, Russia

Matveyev Kurgan Матвеев Курган
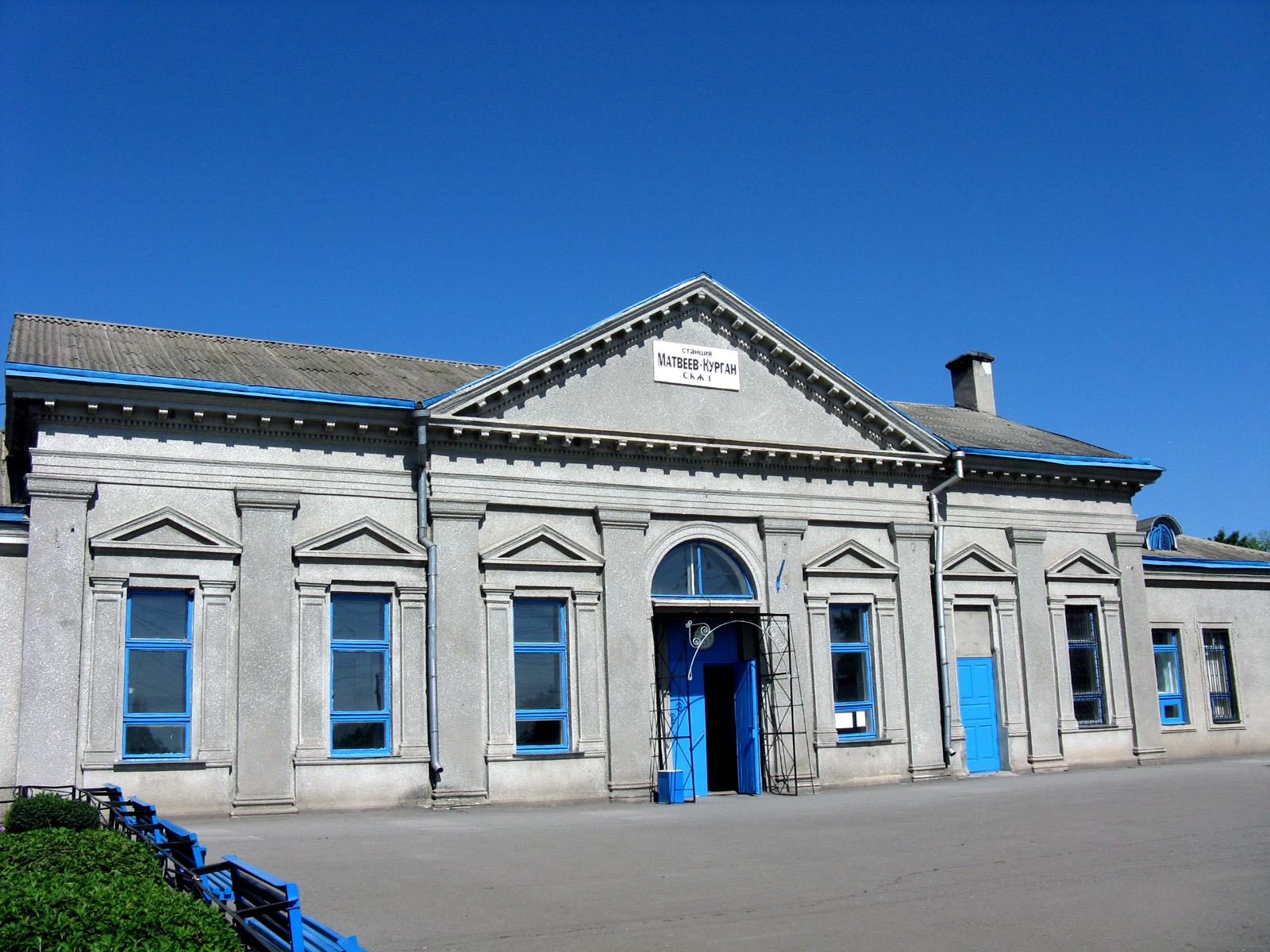
- Railway station

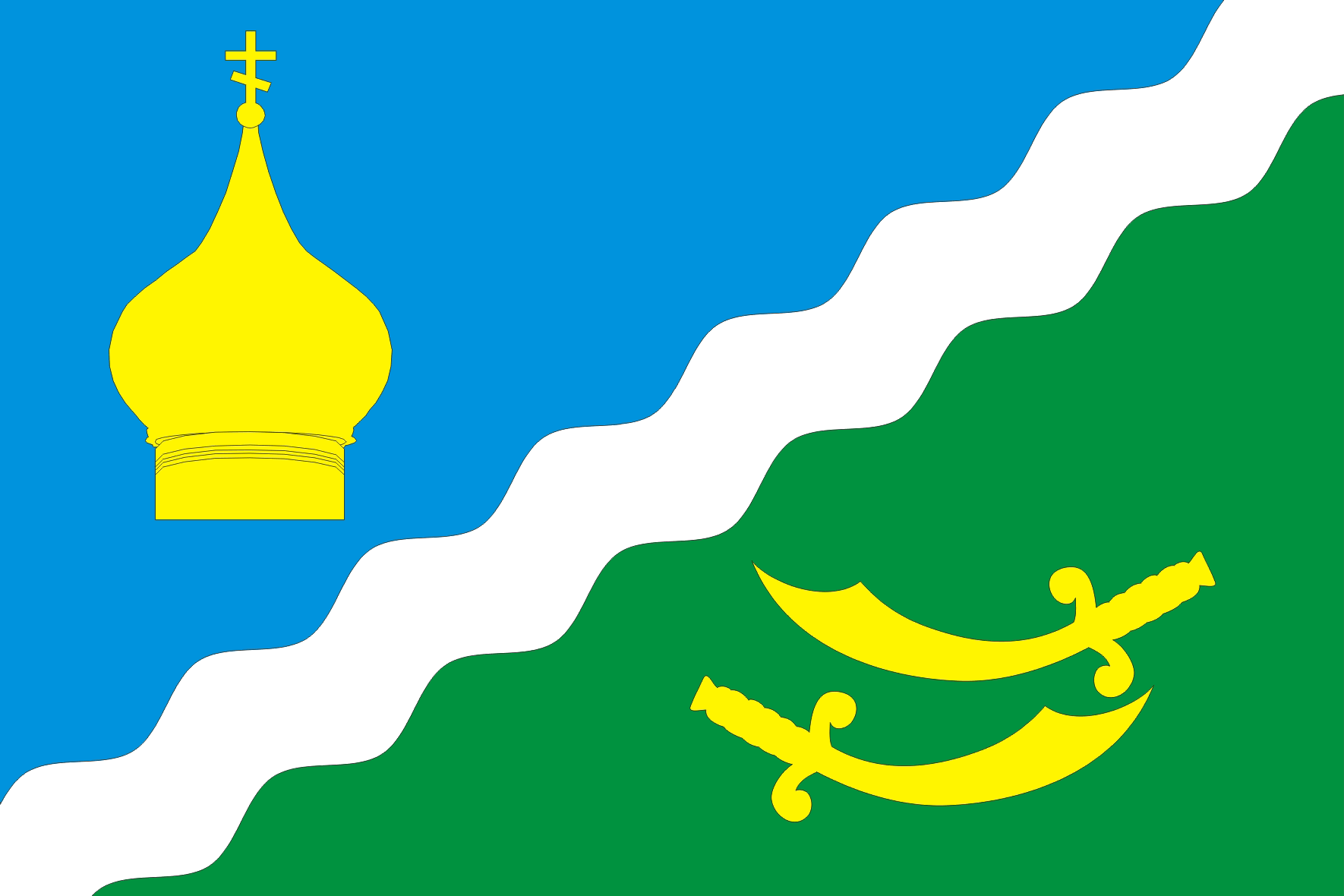
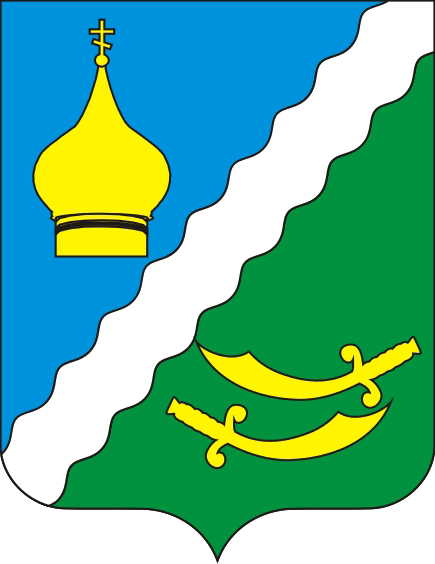
- Flag Coat of arms
- Interactive map of Matveyev Kurgan
- Location of Matveyev Kurgan Matveyev Kurgan (European Russia) Matveyev Kurgan (Russia)
- Coordinates: 47°34′20″N 38°52′00″E
- Country: Russia
- Federal subject: Rostov Oblast
- Founded: 1780

Population
  - Estimate (2014): 15,489 )
- Time zone: UTC+3 (MSK)
- Postal code: 346970
- OKTMO ID: 60631445101

Matveyev Kurgan (Russian: Матвеев Курган; Ukrainian: Матвіїв Курган, romanized: Matviiv Kurhan) is a rural locality (a settlement) and the administrative center of Matveyevo-Kurgansky District, Rostov Oblast, Russia.

== Demographics ==
Its population has grown over the decades: 15,590 (2010 census); 14,364 (2002 census); 13,892 (1989 Soviet census).

== History ==
The Russians started settling this territory district in the beginning of the 18th century under the orders of Peter I. The Mius river basin was settled especially in the second half of the 1770s and early 1780s. Thus, the history of the village of Matveev Kurgan dates to 1780. It was founded by the Cossack Ataman Ilovaiskiy.

These places are mentioned in the legend of "The Word about Igor's regiment". The eighteenth century saw the colonization of Russia's southern territories. Runaway serfs who were attracted by the favorable climate and proximity to seas and rivers migrated to Matveyev Kurgan. Matvey was one of those settlers. He was known as "Terrible", because he was a terror to all passing carts. This legendary image is reminiscent of Robin Hood. Like the latter Matvey robbed passing merchants and helped the poor, for which he was hated by the first and idolized by the second. Matvey lived in the steppes of Primiusye, uniting hundreds of like-minded people, and became their leader – Ataman. According to the legend explaining the name of the village, Matvey was killed and buried on the mound on the river. According to one version, the building of the district hospital stands on his grave, while another version points to the office the Center of employment.

The Russian kurgan has another meaning – “grave”. The settlement Matveev Kurgan was formed around the ataman's mound.

Under its Ukrainian name Matviiv Kurhan it was administratively part of the Donets Governorate of Ukraine from 1920 to 1924.

In September 1937 Matveev Kurgan became part of Rostov region. During World War II, in October 1941 German troops captured the area. Soon a powerful line of defense called the Mius-front was built and was the scene of fierce fighting. Having freed Rostov-on-Don on February 14, 1943, the troops of the Southern Front rushed to the Mius, and on February 17 Matveev Kurgan was liberated.

== Geography ==
The village is located in the northwestern part of Rostov Oblast on the left bank of the Mius. A railway station is sited 91 km from Rostov-on-Don, 45 km from Taganrog.

== Culture ==
Matveev Kurgan is known for monuments of military glory: Monument "Anchor" Matveev Kurgan, Monument "Motherland" Matveev Kurgan, Monument "Regulator Maria" Matveev Kurgan, Monument "Soldier" Matveev Kurgan, Monument "Tank T-34" Matveev Kurgan. Most of them became landmarks of the district, attracting tourists.
