= Motherland Monument (Matveev Kurgan) =

Concrete monument in Rostov Oblast, Russia

Monument
- Monument "Motherland" Matveev Kurgan
- Interactive map of Monument
- Location: Matveev Kurgan, Rostov Oblast, Russia
- Coordinates: 47°35′35″N 38°51′58″E
- Height: 8 m (26 ft)

The Motherland Monument in Matveev Kurgan (Russian: Памятник "Родина-Мать" в Матвеев Кургане) is a concrete monument located near the village of Starorotovka, Russia.

== History ==
The monument is located on the departure from the settlement of Matveev Kurgan near the village Starorotovka, 300 meters from the route Rostov-on-Don (Russia)-Donetsk (Ukraine). On a high pedestal there is an artificial green barrow, a sculpture of a mother with a child in her arms. The monument is made of concrete. The sculptor is Perfilov V. I. Its height is 8 meters. There is a flower bed that leads to the monument where during spring bright poppies blossom, symbolizing blood spots on the black earth. At the edges of an asphalted paths there are blue spruces.

Before the entrance on the right side of the path there was an inscription – "It is devoted to the woman – mother"(Currently the inscription is missing) and "What does Motherland begin with? It begins with that song that was sung to us by mother". The monument was opened in September, 1980.

"The monument impresses with the size. Its mission is to show us wide perspective, panorama. It looks good from afar – on the background of the sky and steppes. Great force is reflected in its form. Each of us knows that the tenderest feelings of human heart from the first days of life are connected with mother, her love and caress, with her caring hands, with greatness of her maternal soul … Despite its impressive size the monument looks very touching: a woman-mother with the small child in her arms won’t leave anybody indifferent…".

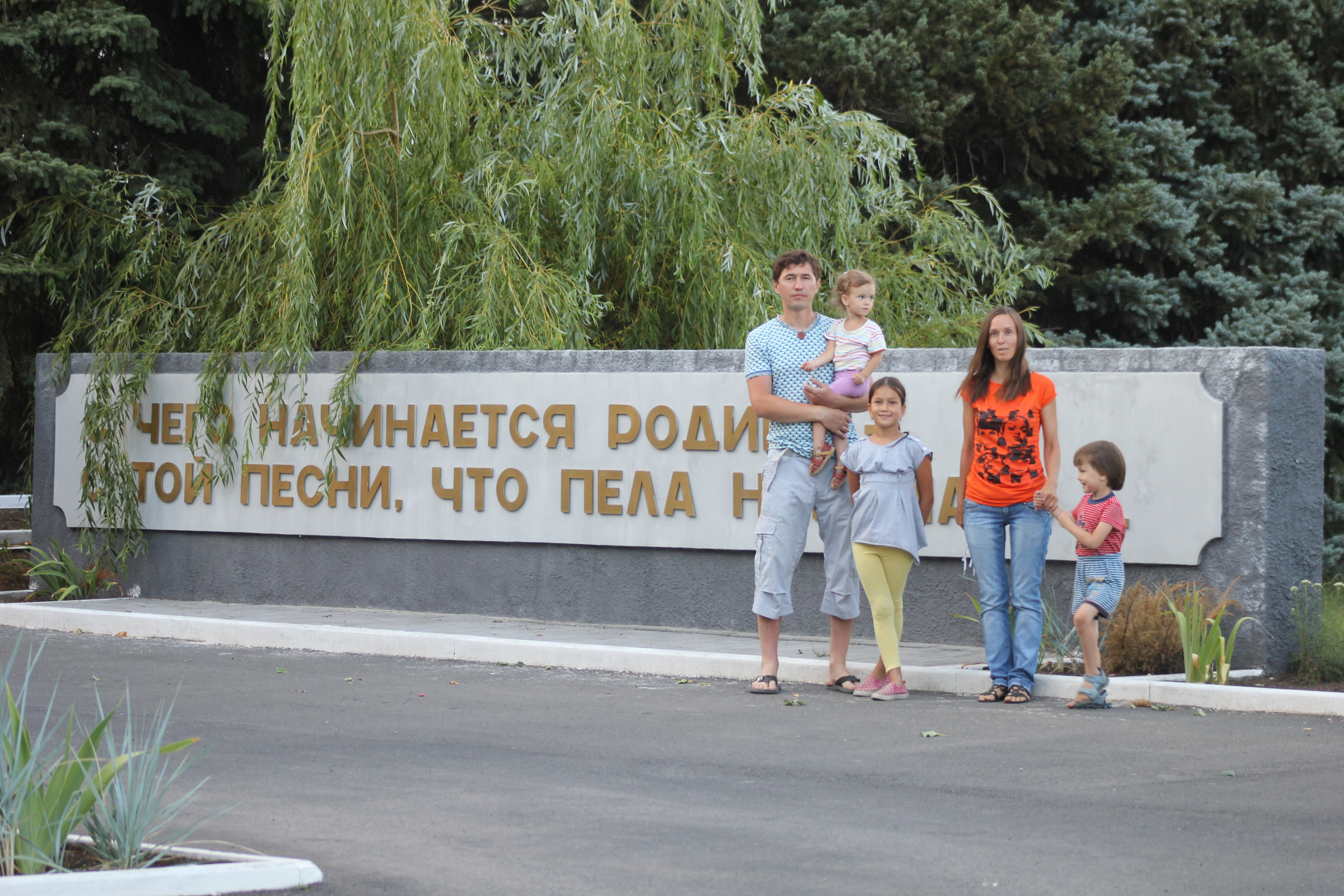
Families like to come here on Memorial days

== See also ==
- Personification of Russia

== Sources ==
- "Monuments of military glory of Matveevo-Kurgan district" brief tourist information on the tourist route; L.A.Esina; 2016
