= Personification of Russia =

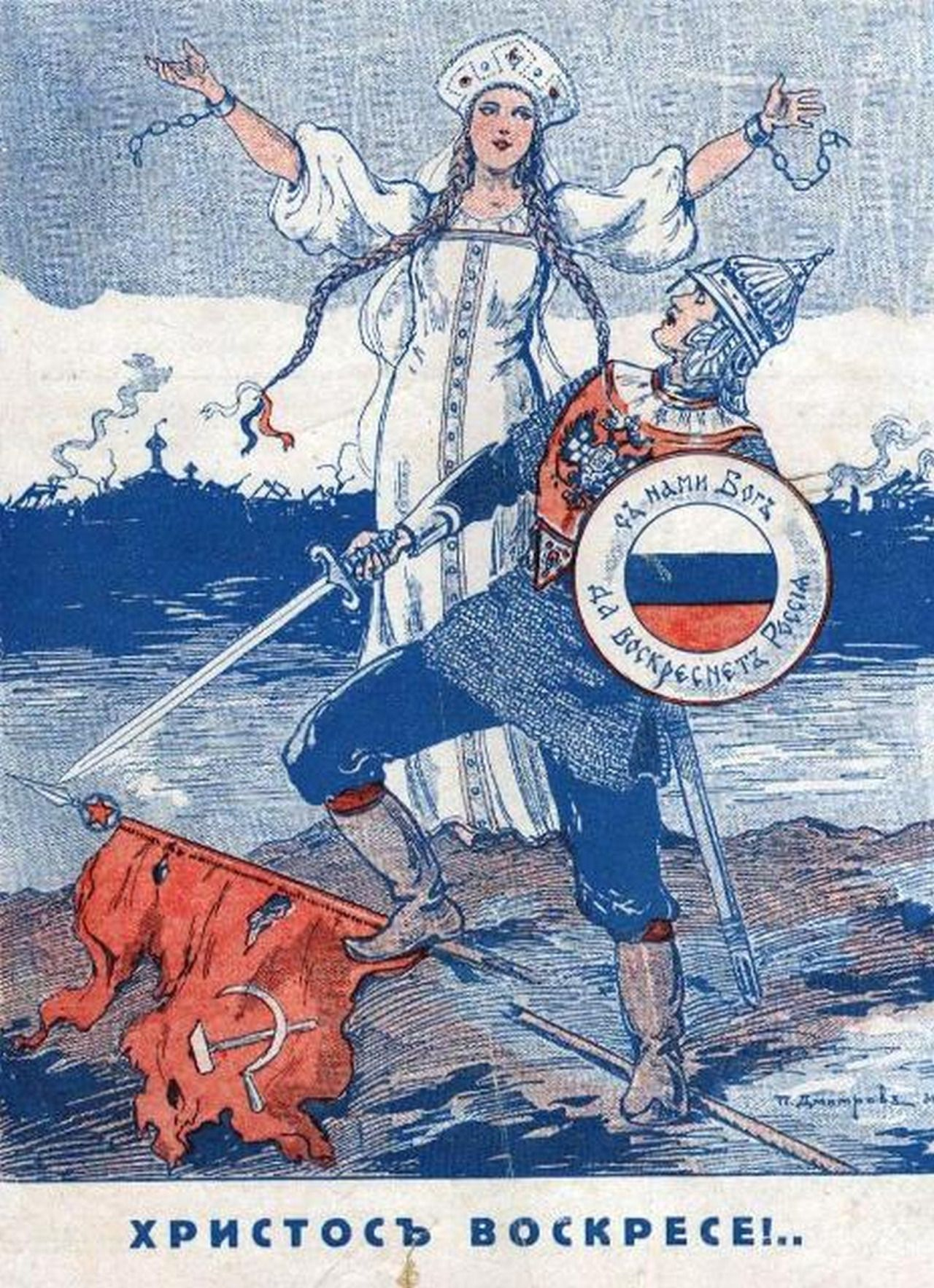
A cover of Sentry magazine, approx. 1932, depicting Russia as a woman in a traditional costume liberated by a warrior in medieval armor with a shield depicting the nationalist Russian flag, trampling the Communist flag. The words "ХРИСТОС ВОСКРЕСЕ" roughly translate to "Christ is Risen" and is the greeting used by Russians on Easter Day.

The personification of Russia is traditionally feminine and most commonly maternal since the Middle Ages. The common terms for the national personification of Russia are:

- Mother Russia

Russian: Матушка Россия, romanized: Matushka Rossiya (dim.); also
Russian: Мать-Россия, romanized: Mat'-Rossiya; or
Russian: Матушка Русь, romanized: Matushka Rus', lit. 'Mother Rus''; or
Russian: Россия-матушка, romanized: Rossiya-matushka, lit. 'Russia the Mother'

- Homeland the Mother

Russian: Родина-мать, romanized: Rodina-mat

In the Russian language, the concept of motherland is rendered by two terms:

- "place of birth", (feminine gender, Russian: ро́дина, romanized: rodina)
- "fatherland", (masculine gender, Russian: отечество, отчи́зна, romanized: otchizna)

Harald Haarmann and Orlando Figes see the goddess Mokosh a source of the "Mother Russia" concept. Mikhail Epstein states that Russia's historical reliance on agriculture supported a mythological view of the earth as a "divine mother", leading in turn to the terminology of "Mother Russia". Epstein also notes the feminine perceptions of the names Rus' and Rossiia, allowing for natural expressions of matushka Rossiia (Mother Russia).

== Usage ==
During the Soviet period, the Bolsheviks extensively utilized the image of "Motherland", especially during World War II.

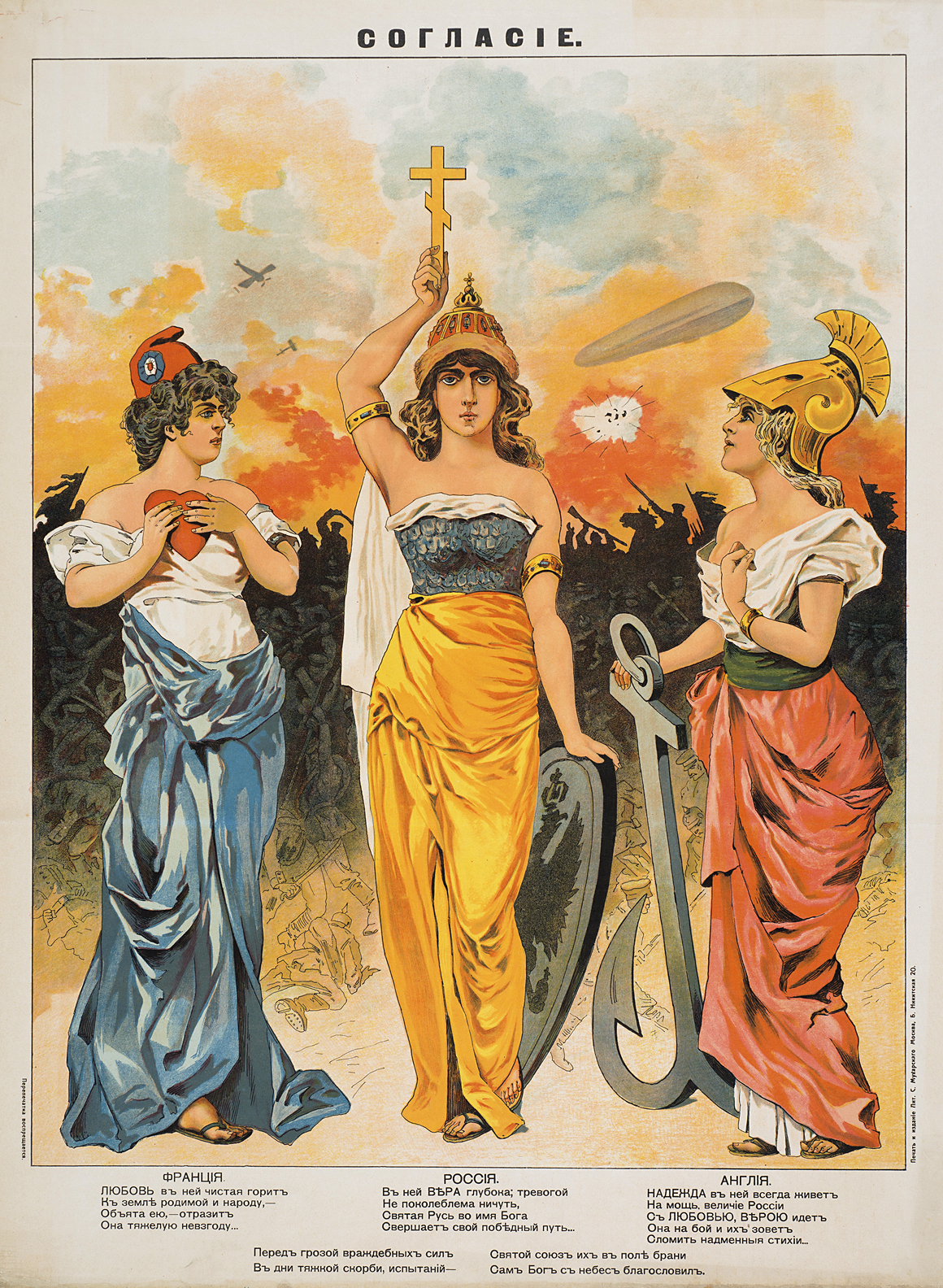
1914 Russian poster depicting the Triple Entente – Britannia (right) and Marianne (left) in the company of Mother Russia.

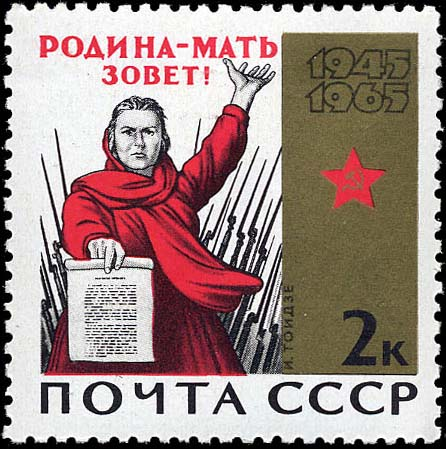
"For the Motherland!" on a 1965 Soviet stamp. The literal translation is "Motherland calls!"

== Statues ==
During the Soviet era, many statues depicting the Mother Motherland were built, most to commemorate the Great Patriotic War. These include:

- The Motherland Calls (Russian: Родина-мать зовёт, tr. Rodina-mat' zovyot), a colossal statue in Volgograd, Russia, commemorating the Battle of Stalingrad
- Mother Motherland (Ukrainian: Батьківщина-Мати, tr. Batʹkivshchyna-Maty, Russian: Родина-мать, tr. Rodina-mat' ), now called Mother Ukraine, is a monumental statue in Kyiv that is a part of the Museum of The History of Ukraine in World War II
- Mother Motherland (Saint Petersburg), a statue at the Piskarevskoye Memorial Cemetery, St. Petersburg, Russia
- Mother Russia (Kaliningrad), a monument in Kaliningrad, Russia
- Mother Motherland Mourning over Her Perished Sons (Russian: Родина-мать, скорбящая о погибших сыновьях, tr. Rodina-mat', skorbyashchaya o pogibshikh synov'yakh), Minsk, Belarus commemorating the dead in Afghanistan
- Mother Motherland (Naberezhnye Chelny), a monument in Naberezhnye Chelny, Russia
- Mother Motherland (Pavlovsk), a memorial complex, Pavlovsk, Voronezh Oblast, Russia
- Motherland Monument (Matveev Kurgan)

== See also ==
- Defender of the Fatherland Day
- Mat Zemlya
- Russian Bear
- Propaganda in Russia
- Propaganda in the Soviet Union
