= Soldier Monument (Matveev Kurgan) =

Monument
- Monument "Soldier" Matveev Kurgan
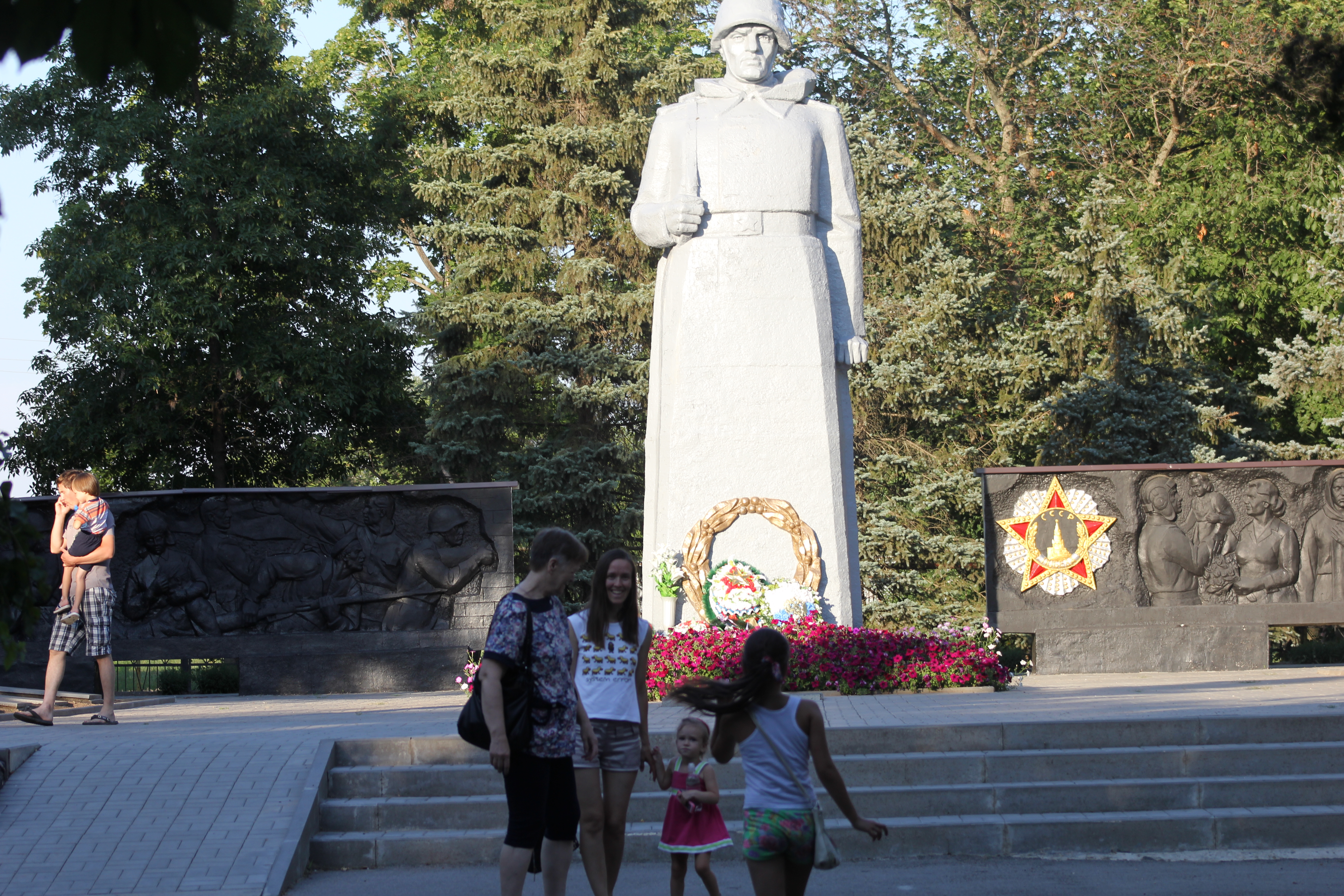
- Location: Matveev Kurgan, Rostov Oblast, Russia
- Height: 7 m (23 ft)

The Monument "Soldier" Matveev Kurgan (Russian: Памятник Неизвестному солдату в Матвеев Кургане) is a Russian monument located Matveev Kurgan.

== History ==
The Soldier Memorial was opened in 1968, the day of the 25th anniversary of the liberation of the region from the German fascist invaders. The composition was created by the sculptor Perfilov V.I. Collective farms, state farms and other institutions of the district took part in the construction of the monument. The names of the natives of Matveev Kurgan who died on the fronts of the Great Patriotic War are immortalized on 40 granite plates. Description of the monument: in the centre, above the mass grave, there is a sculpture of a soldier in a grey greatcoat, in a steel helmet with a gun over his shoulder. The height of the monument is 7 meters. The Memorial is made of concrete, ring casting. Different episodes of the Great Patriotic War are depicted on the right and left of the soldier's sculpture: the family is seeing off the fighter to the front, the mother is mourning her son, the soldiers are going to attack, a meeting of soldiers- winners with civilians, Victory Day, the Order of Victory. The names of the natives of Matveev Kurgan who died on the fronts of the Great Patriotic War are immortalized on the granite plates. More than 600 people were buried in the mass grave. The locals respect the past of the Fatherland, the historical events of the Great Patriotic War, the history of the small homeland, care for the monuments and memorials of the dead soldiers, keep the traditions and pass them on to future generations. On Victory Day and other memorable days this monument is a place of worship.

== Sources ==
- "Monuments of military glory of Matveevo-Kurgan district" brief tourist information on the tourist route; L.A.Esina; 2016
