= Matveyevo-Kurgansky District =

Matveyevo-Kurgansky District Матвеево-Курганский район (Russian)
- District
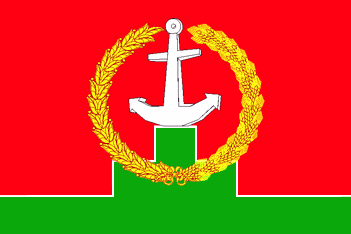
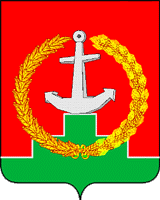
- Flag Coat of arms
- Location of Matveyevo-Kurgansky District in Rostov Oblast
- Coordinates: 47°34′20″N 38°52′00″E
- Country: Russia
- Federal subject: Rostov Oblast
- Established: 1923
- Administrative center: Matveyev Kurgan

Area
  - Total: 1,707 km^{2} (659 sq mi)

Population (2010 Census)
  - Total: 43,446
  - Density: 25.45/km^{2} (65.92/sq mi)
  - Urban: 0%
  - Rural: 100%

Administrative structure
  - Administrative divisions: 8 rural settlement
  - Inhabited localities: 80 rural localities

Municipal structure
  - Municipally incorporated as: Matveyevo-Kurgansky Municipal District
  - Municipal divisions: 0 urban settlements, 8 rural settlements
- Time zone: UTC+3 (MSK)
- OKTMO ID: 60631000
- Website: http://www.matveevkurgan.ru/

Matveyevo-Kurgansky District (Russian: Матве́ево-Курга́нский райо́н) is an administrative and municipal district (raion), one of the forty-three in Rostov Oblast, Russia. It is located in the west of the oblast. The area of the district is 1,707 square kilometers (659 sq mi). Its administrative center is the rural locality (a settlement) of Matveyev Kurgan. Population: 43,446 (2010 Census); 45,604 (2002 census); 42,992 (1989 Soviet census). The population of Matveyev Kurgan accounts for 35.9% of the district's total population.
