= Panasonic Life Solutions India Pvt. Ltd. =

Indian electrical device manufacturing subsidiary of Panasonic

- Trade name: Anchor by Panasonic
- Formerly: Anchor Electricals
- Company type: Subsidiary
- Industry: Electrical products
- Founded: 1963; 63 years ago
- Headquarters: Mumbai, India
- Products: Electric switches; Wiring devices; Fans, Lighting; Solar; Switchgear; Cables; Power tools
- Parent: Panasonic (2007–present)
- Website: www.lsin.panasonic.com

Panasonic Life Solutions India Pvt. Ltd. (d/b/a ANCHOR by Panasonic) an Indian electrical equipment company. It is the largest manufacturer of modular and non-modular electrical switches in India. Aside from switches, it also manufactures low voltage switchgear, wires and cables, light and fans among other things.

== History ==
Established in 1963 as Anchor Electricals Pvt. Ltd., now Panasonic Life Solutions India Pvt. Ltd. is a wholly owned subsidiary of the Panasonic Corporation of Japan. Panasonic acquired Anchor, the 50-year-old Indian family-owned electrical equipment brand, in 2007. The Company offers wires, cables, switchgears, lights, luminaries, fans, circuit breakers, heat and smoke detectors, video door phones, and other electrical products. It also sells home automation products from Panasonic.

The company's new manufacturing unit has been built at Daman, India. The investment for the plant has been Rs 200 crores and will produce a complete range of wiring devices. The plant's current production capacity is of 240 million units. For the first two years, the products manufactured at Daman will cater to the domestic market. By 2015 the company was expecting 5 percent of their revenues to come from exports. The factory has adopted features like installation of LED lighting, solar panels and use of treated sewage water.
