= Anker (automobile) =

German automobile manufacturer

The Anker was a German automobile manufactured in Berlin between 1919 and 1920. Cars were built up from war-surplus components of the 1,145 cc (69.9 cu in) inline-four engine Wanderer.
