= Knarr (keelboat) =

Sailboat class

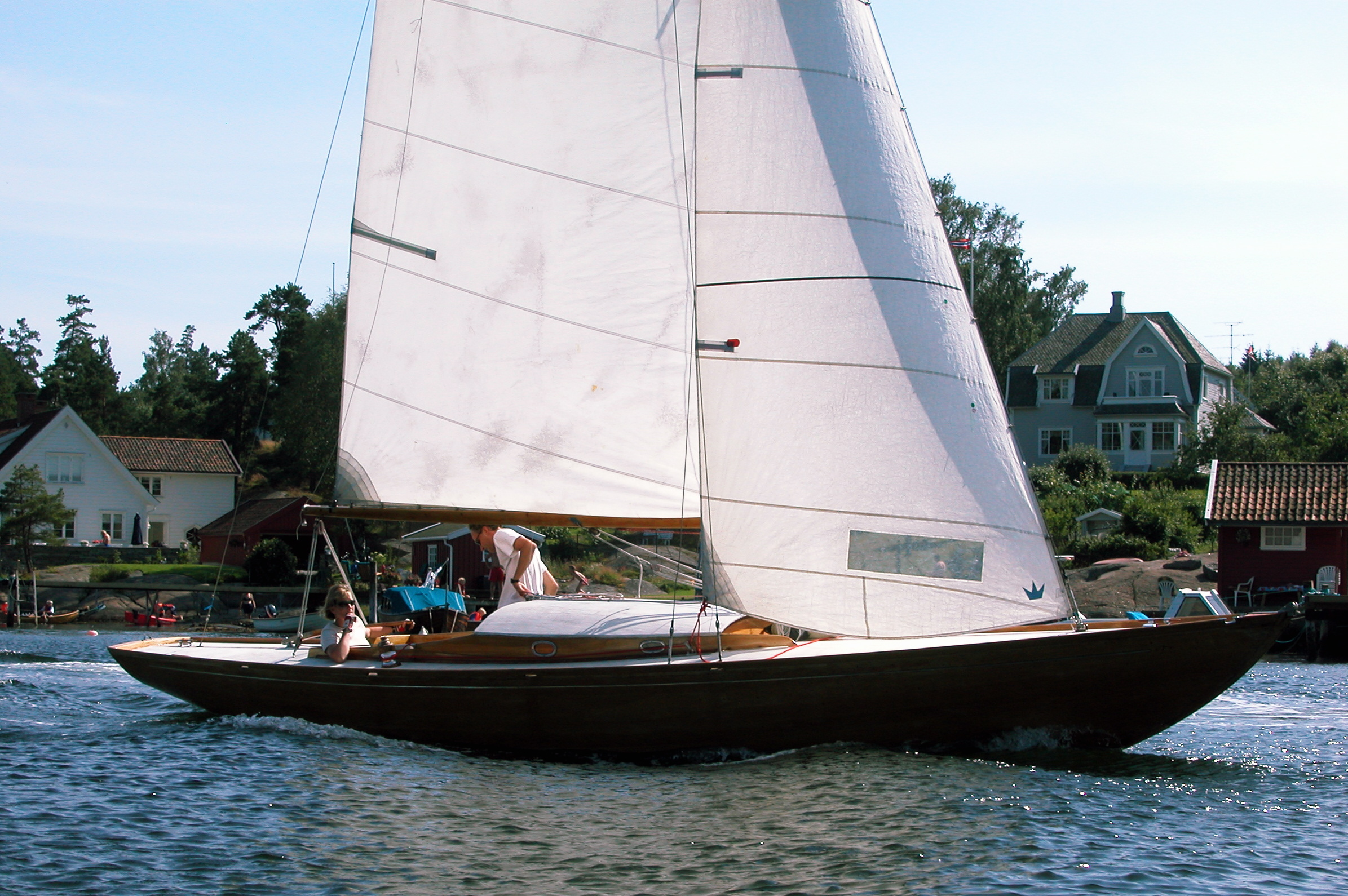

Development
- Designer: Erling Kristoffersen
- Location: Norway
- Year: 1946
- No. built: 450
- Builders: Grimsøykilen Boat Yard; Kilen Boat Yard; Børresen Bådebyggeri; Bootswerft Schneidereit
- Role: Racer
- Name: Knarr

Boat
- Crew: 3-4
- Displacement: 4,905 lb (2,225 kg)
- Draft: 4.26 ft (1.30 m)

Hull
- Type: monohull
- Construction: wood or fiberglass
- LOA: 30.33 ft (9.24 m)
- LWL: 20.37 ft (6.21 m)
- Beam: 6.95 ft (2.12 m)

Hull appendages
- Keel: fin keel
- Ballast: 2,822 lb (1,280 kg)
- Rudder: keel-mounted rudder

Rig
- Rig type: Bermuda rig
- I foretriangle height: 25.43 ft (7.75 m)
- J foretriangle base: 6.56 ft (2.00 m)
- P mainsail luff: 31.00 ft (9.45 m)
- E mainsail foot: 11.06 ft (3.37 m)

Sails
- Sailplan: fractional rigged sloop
- Mainsail area: 171.43 sq ft (15.926 m^{2})
- Jib/genoa area: 83.41 sq ft (7.749 m^{2})
- Total sail area: 254.84 sq ft (23.675 m^{2})

Racing
- D-PN: 91.0

The Knarr is a Norwegian sailboat that was designed in 1943 by Erling Kristoffersen as a racer, with the first production boat delivered in 1946. It is named for the Norse class of trading ships, the Knarr.

== Production ==
The design was initially built at Grimsøykilen Boat Yard and Kilen Boat Yard in Norway and later by Børresen Bådebyggeri in Denmark. In 2004 production passed to Bootswerft Schneidereit of Germany, but that company ceased building boats on 31 May 2018 and it is now out of production. A total of 450 boats were produced.

== Development ==
The design's concept dates to before 1940, when Willy H. Johannesen and Lars Walløe contacted Kristofersen about designing a replacement for the Nordic Folkboat, which was considered an ugly boat design in Norway. Kristofersen was approached due to having already designed other successful racing sailboats. With Norway under German occupation in the Second World War, work was slow and the design was not completed until 1943. The choice of iron for the keel was dictated by wartime restrictions making lead unobtainable.

Work on the prototype started in 1944 at Einar Iversen's property in Grimsøy, near Sarpsborg, which later grew into Grimsøykilen Boat Yard. The Germans imposed strict regulations on boatbuilding and sailing during the war, but Iversen was allowed to continue work, by promising the first boat to the Germans. He claimed that the prototype as completed was too flawed and promised the Germans the second one, which was constructed in the winter of 1944-45. The occupation of Norway ended before the German boat was delivered and the first production boats were delivered in 1946.

== Design ==
The Knarr is a recreational keelboat that was initially built of mahogany or fir wood on a hull-shaped last. Wooden construction avoided the use of strategic materials during the Second World War. In 1974 the design was converted by Børresen Bådebyggeri to fiberglass construction, with wooden trim, starting with hull number 129. The fiberglass version preserves the weight and balance of the wooden version.

The boat has a fractional sloop rig, initially with spruce wood spars and later with aluminum. The forestay set well aft of the bow. The hull has a spooned, raked stem; a raised counter, angled transom; a keel-mounted rudder controlled by a tiller and a fixed fin keel. It displaces 4,905 lb (2,225 kg) and carries 2,822 lb (1,280 kg) of iron ballast.

The boat has a draft of 4.26 ft (1.30 m) with the standard keel. For sailing the design is equipped with only a mainsail and jib, no spinnaker.

The design has a Portsmouth Yardstick racing average handicap of 91.0 and is normally raced by a crew of three to four sailors.

== Operational history ==
The boat is supported by three active class clubs that organize racing events, the Norsk Knarrklubb founded in 1951 in Norway, the Dansk Knarr Klub formed in 1955 in Denmark and the Knarr Class of San Francisco Bay in the United States.

As of 2011 there were racing fleets in Norway, Denmark and San Francisco Bay, with some boats also located in Germany and France. In 1968, the national clubs created an International Knarr Championship, which is held sequentially in Oslo and Bergen, Norway, San Francisco and Denmark.

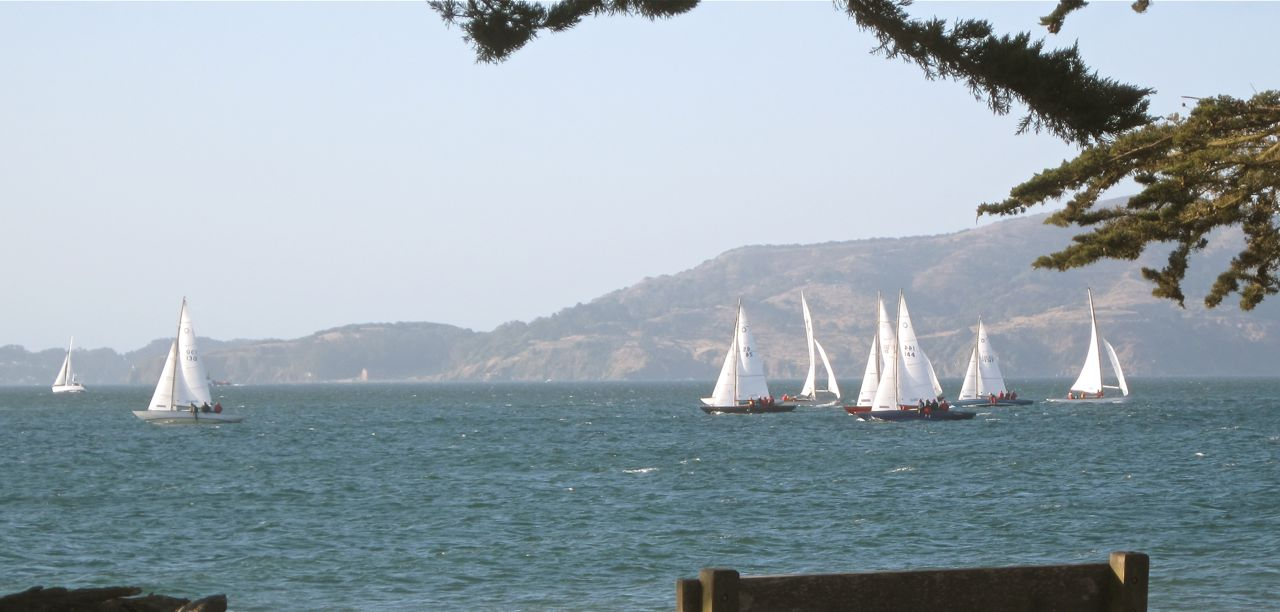
A Knarr Regatta on San Francisco Bay in 2009

The design was introduced to San Francisco in 1953 by Einar Iversen's son, Bjørn Iversen, who was attending Stanford University. The design proved well-suited to the windy conditions and the chop of San Francisco Bay and gained a following there.

In 1966, the Knarr Irina was sailed by Georg V. Erpecom Jr. from Bergen to the Centenary Regatta in Copenhagen and then to Oslo, the longest voyage that had been sailed by a Knarr up until that time. Erpecom was awarded the Royal Norwegian Yacht Club's Cruise Racing Trophy for the trip.

In 1967 the Royal Danish Yacht Club presented Margrethe II of Denmark and Prince Henrik a Knarr as a wedding gift.

== See also ==
- List of sailing boat types

Similar sailboats

- Shields (keelboat)
