= Christian Anker (businessman) =

Norwegian businessperson

Christian Anker (19 August 1917 – 13 December 1988) was a Norwegian businessperson.

He was born in Kristiania, and spent his career in the family company P. Schreiner sen. & Co with 37 years as director. He retired in 1978.

He also served as board chairman of P. Schreiner sen. & Co, chaired daughter companies such as Staal & Jern and Andr. Grønneberg, was a board member of Kværner and the Royal Norwegian Yacht Club, and supervisory council member of Kreditkassen. He was a board member of Selskabet for Oslo Byes Vel from 1966, succeeded Arno Berg as chairman in 1970 and stepped down in 1978. He contributed with metal and steel information to Farmand and Norges Handels- og Sjøfartstidende.

He was a yacht racer, and became Norwegian champion in the Knarr in 1958 and Dragon in 1967. He died in 1988 and was buried at Ris.
