= Ed Anker =

Dutch politician

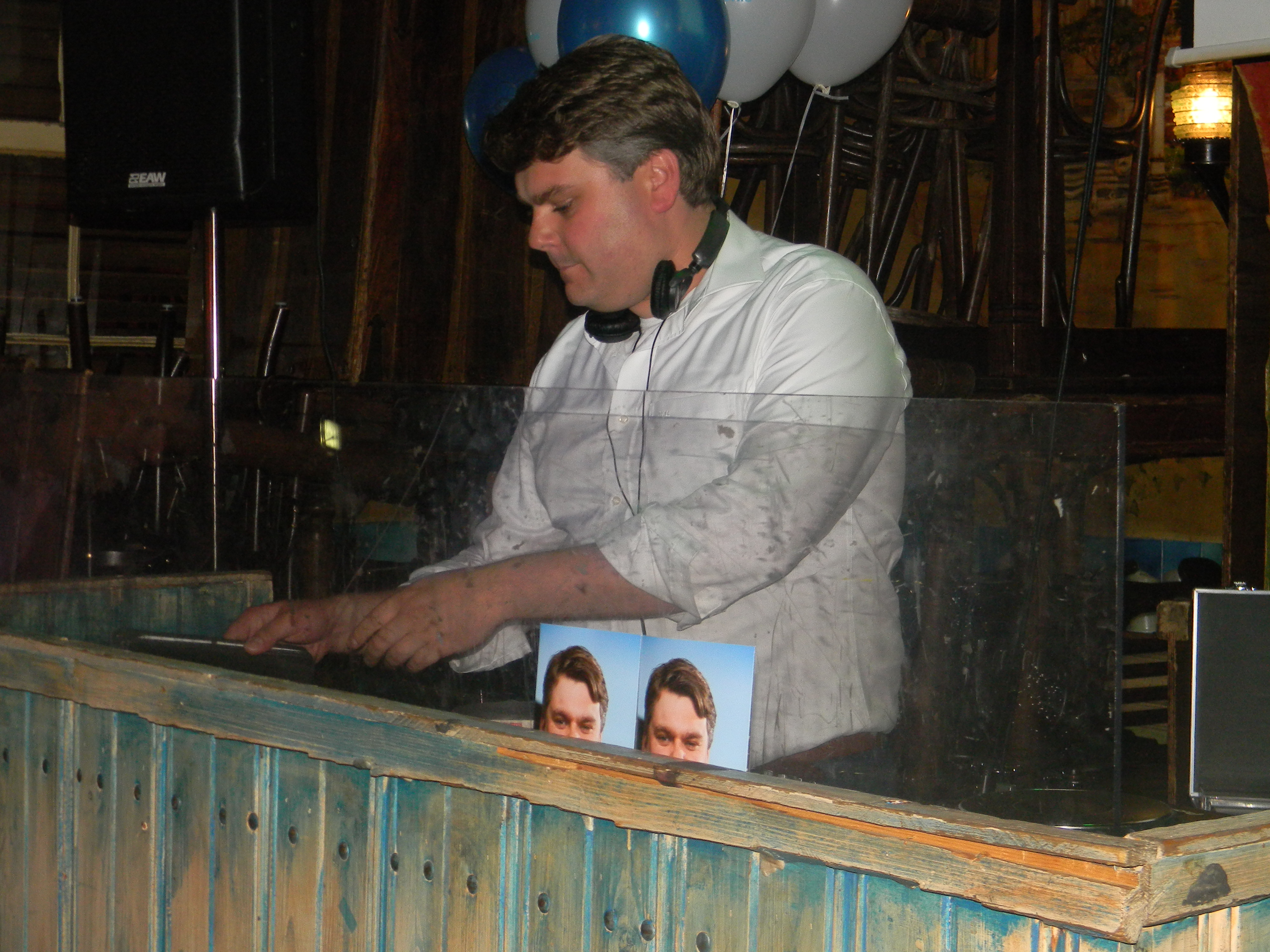

Member of the House of Representatives
- In office 1 March 2007 – 16 June 2010

Personal details
- Born: 30 June 1978 (age 47) Beverwijk, Netherlands
- Party: ChristianUnion
- Spouse: Married
- Occupation: Politician
- Website: Personal website (in Dutch)

Eize Willem (Ed) Anker (born 30 June 1978) is a former member of the Dutch House of Representatives for the ChristianUnion. Since 26 May 2014 he has been an alderman of Zwolle.

Anker started his political career in the youth organisation of the Reformed Political Alliance, one of the predecessors of the ChristianUnion. He studied political science in Amsterdam. From 2005 to 2007 Anker was a member of the city council of Zaandam. In 2006 he was nominated for the eight place on the candidate list of the ChristianUnion for the coming elections of the House of Representatives. The party doubled its number of seats from three to six, but when it became a member of the newly formed fourth Balkenende cabinet André Rouvoet and Tineke Huizinga, both members of the House of Representatives for the ChristianUnion, became respectively Minister for Youth and Family and State Secretary for Transport and Water Management. This made it possible for Anker to become a member of the Parliament in March 2007. After the general elections of 2010 he lost his seat.

From 26 April 2012 till spring 2014 he was an alderman of Almere, succeeding flautist Berdien Stenberg.
