= Anchor Monument (Matveev Kurgan) =

Monument
- Monument "Anchor" Matveev Kurgan
- Location: Matveev Kurgan, Rostov Oblast, Russia
- Height: 27 m (89 ft)

The Monument "Anchor" Matveev Kurgan (Russian: Памятник "Якорь" в Матвеев Кургане) ― Monument "Anchor" Matveev Kurgan.

== History ==
Not far from Matveev Kurgan in Rostov region on the top of Volkov mountain (it is height 101) there is a huge sparkling Anchor. Its height is about 27 meters. It was built in 1973. It is a powerful construction covered with metal sheets. At the pedestal of the monument there is an inscription "Having demonstrated bravery and heroism the sailors seized this fascists' main base.

The Anchor is seen from all sides of Matveev Kurgan district and it is a symbol of courage and bravery .This monument is devoted to the infantry sailors. March 1942 is always remembered as the historical and bloody battle.

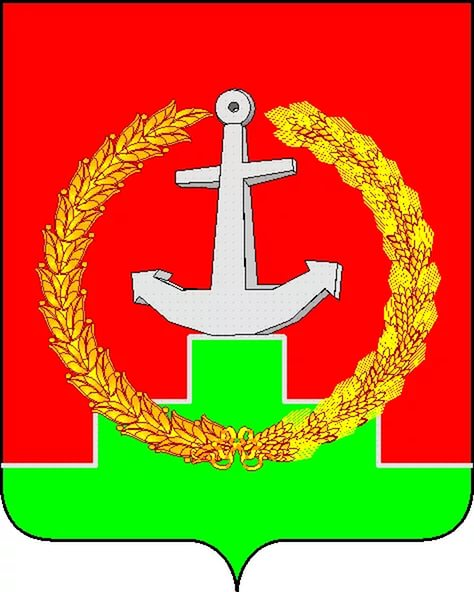
Symbol of Matveev Kurgan district

March 1942. The Soviet Army attacks fascists in order to liberate Taganrog. In this operation the navy brigade of the 3-th infantry army corps took part. "101 height" (the mountain Volkov)was the key point of resistance, German tank division "Viking". At 5 o'clock in the morning of the 8 of March the storm of the height started.

It was a terrible fight. The 68 navy army brigade lost 2532 sailors. And the 76 brigade lost 1312 people on the same day. The battle lasted for 3 days.

This monument is the remarkable sight and symbol of Matveev Kurgan district, it is very popular and loved by citizens who always honor those who gave their lives for our freedom.

In the early 2000s at the foot of Volkova mountain students of Matveev Kurgan school №3 members of the club «Patriot» installed two stones, symbolizing «The Field of Grief» with the inscription:

«Before the height memory overgrown

In The Field of Grief, friend, stop

Think about the current and past

On the peers distant look around».

This is a place where the reconstructions of battle The Great Patriotic War are carried out. So, in 2005 reconstruction of «And tomorrow will be war» was carried out. Grand actions, devoted to significant events of the Great Patriotic War are arranged here . Volkova mountain is countrymen’s favorite place, because nothing can be compared with the beauty of the landscape. This majestic monument always attracts tourists' attention.

== Sources ==
- Pugaev G.K. Blood and glory of the Mius; Taganrog, 1988, 208 p.
