= Donbas strategic offensive =

Donbas strategic offensive may refer to:

- Donbas strategic offensive (July 1943), a failed offensive by the Soviet Union to retake the Donbas from Nazi Germany
- Donbas strategic offensive (August 1943), an offensive in which the Soviet Union succeeded in expelling Nazi Germany from the Donbas
