= Anchor (New Haven bar) =

Coordinates: 41.307104°N 72.928920°W

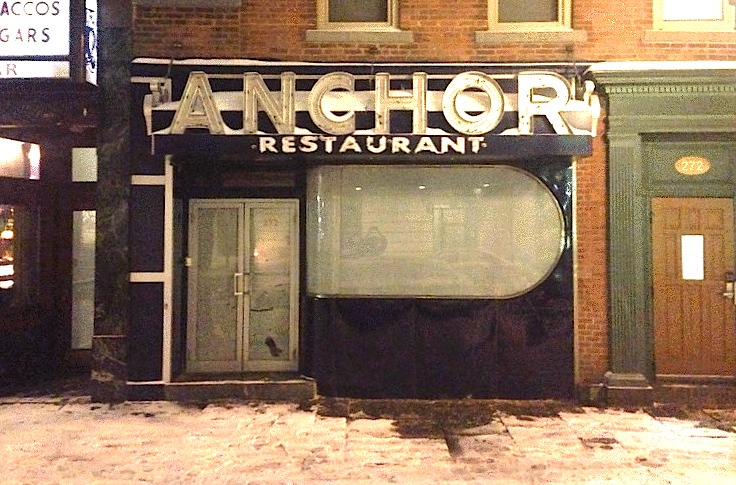
Art-moderne facade of the defunct bar in March 2015

The Anchor is a popular bar and restaurant located at 272 College Street in downtown New Haven that operated from the 1930s until 2015, reopening in 2016. The establishment is popular with students and faculty of neighboring Yale University and patrons of the Shubert Theatre. It was a favorite of playwright Thornton Wilder and also catered to such celebrities as Lucille Ball, Douglas Fairbanks, Jr., and George C. Scott. It is known for its preserved Art Moderne facade and interior. In 2014 Esquire magazine ranked the Anchor among the nation's top 25 bars.

== History ==
The Anchor bar, named for Anchor Beach in the nearby town of Milford, Connecticut, began operating shortly after prohibition. During the 1940s the business was moved to its College Street location. It was owned continuously by the Moore family from 1963 until closing. As of 2016 The Anchor is owned by Karl Franz Williams, and operates under the name Anchor Spa . The "ANCHOR" is still owned by the Moore family. Karl Franz does not own any interest in the "Anchor" nor did he purchase any rights. The registered name, real, and intellectual property is still retained by the Moore family. The "Anchor Spa" is also a dba of the Moore's legal holding and is subject to possible copyright infringement.

== Closure and reopening ==
The Anchor closed abruptly on the night of January 4, 2015. The landlord, Yale University, shut down the establishment after new management repeatedly failed to make rent. Controversy ensued, with a petition gaining over 1000 signatures and New Haven's government stepping in to preserve the mid-century interior and art moderne facade.

The Anchor was reopened 18 months later under its original name Anchor Spa, which dated back to the 1940s. Anchor Spa now serves a proprietary menu of craft mixed drinks inspired from ports around the globe, and small plates with a focus on seafood and local game.
