= Anchor, Kentucky =

Unincorporated community in Kentucky, United States

- Unincorporated community
- Location within Kentucky Location within the United States
- Coordinates: 36°44′52″N 83°52′55″W
- Country: United States
- State: Kentucky
- County: Knox
- Elevation: 1,355 ft (413 m)
- Time zone: UTC-6 (Central (CST))
  - Summer (DST): UTC-5 (CST)
- GNIS feature ID: 2543211

Anchor was an unincorporated community and coal town in Knox County, Kentucky, United States.
