= Eda (building) =

Residential building in Salford Quays, Greater Manchester, England

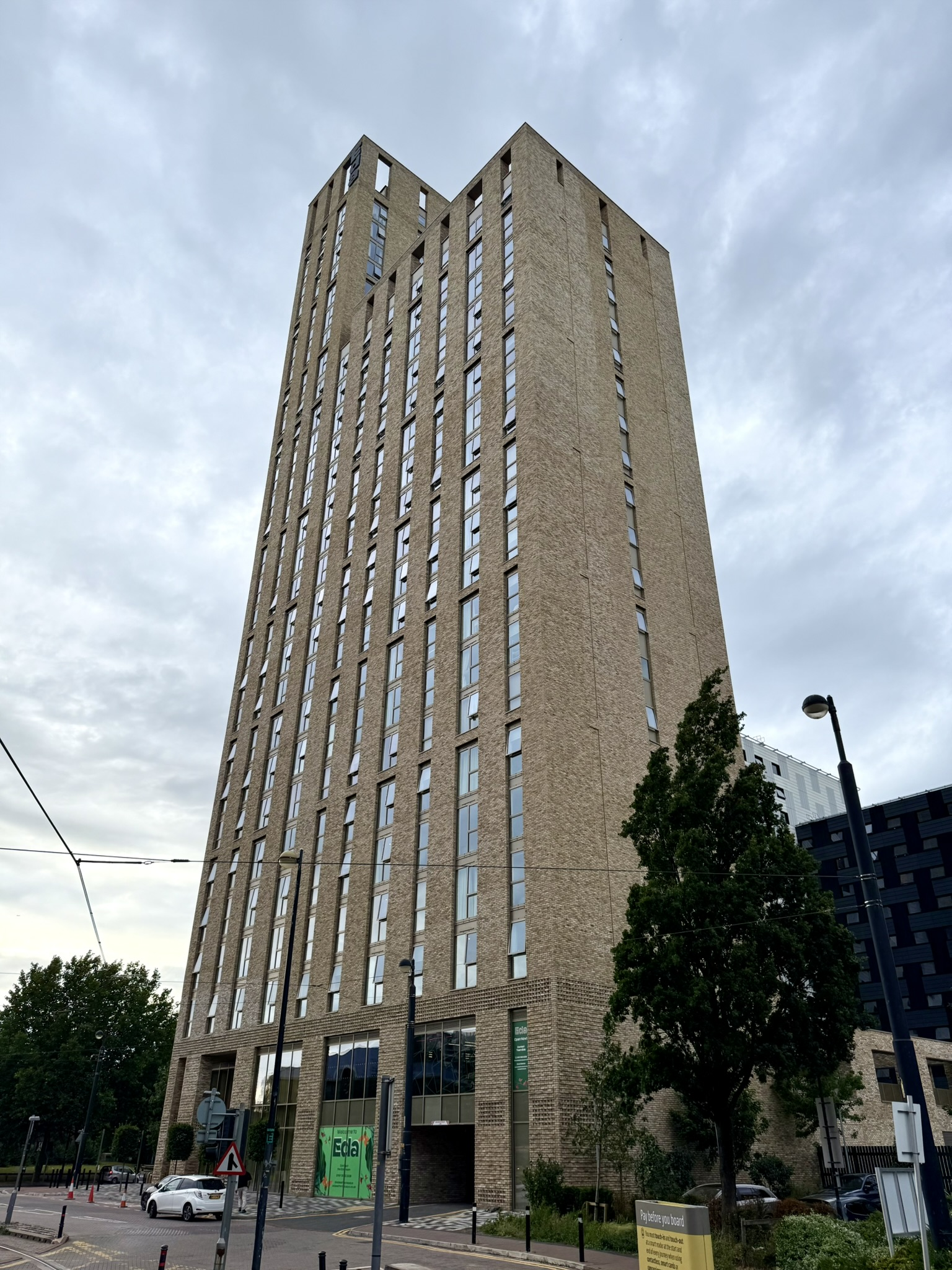
- The building in 2025

- Location within Greater Manchester
- Former names: Anchorage Gateway

General information
- Type: Residential high-rise
- Location: Anchorage Quay, Salford Quays, Greater Manchester, England
- Coordinates: 53.47521°N 2.28407°W
- Construction started: 2021; 5 years ago
- Completed: 2023; 3 years ago
- Owner: Cole Waterhouse; Taurus Investment Holdings Ltd

Height
- Height: 101 m (331 ft)

Technical details
- Floor count: 29
- Floor area: 23,285 m^{2} (250,640 sq ft)

Design and construction
- Architect: Chapman Taylor
- Structural engineer: Renaissance Associates
- Other designers: Jon Matthews Architects
- Main contractor: Domis Construction

Other information
- Number of units: 290

Website
- edasalfordquays.co.uk

Eda (short for Erie Dock Apartments and formerly known as Anchorage Gateway), is a 101-metre (331-foot), 29-storey residential high-rise on Anchorage Quay in Salford Quays, Greater Manchester, England. It was designed by Chapman Taylor, with Jon Matthews Architects serving as the delivery architect, and constructed between 2021 and 2023. As of September 2026, it is the sixth-tallest building in Salford and the 28th-tallest in Greater Manchester.

== History ==
=== Planning ===
The developer, Cole Waterhouse, purchased the site from COIF Charities Property Fund in August 2019. It was previously occupied by The Anchorage, a four-storey office building from the 1990s that had been used by Barclays.

In April 2019, an outline planning application was submitted to Salford City Council for the demolition of the office building and the construction of a residential development of up to 31 storeys and 290 apartments, with up to 1,000 m^{2} (11,000 sq ft) of non-residential floorspace. Planning approval was granted in November 2019.

In March 2020, a reserved matters application was submitted to the council for 290 apartments with up to 400 m^{2} (4,300 sq ft) of non-residential floorspace within a part 19, part 28-storey building. Planning approval was granted in October 2020.

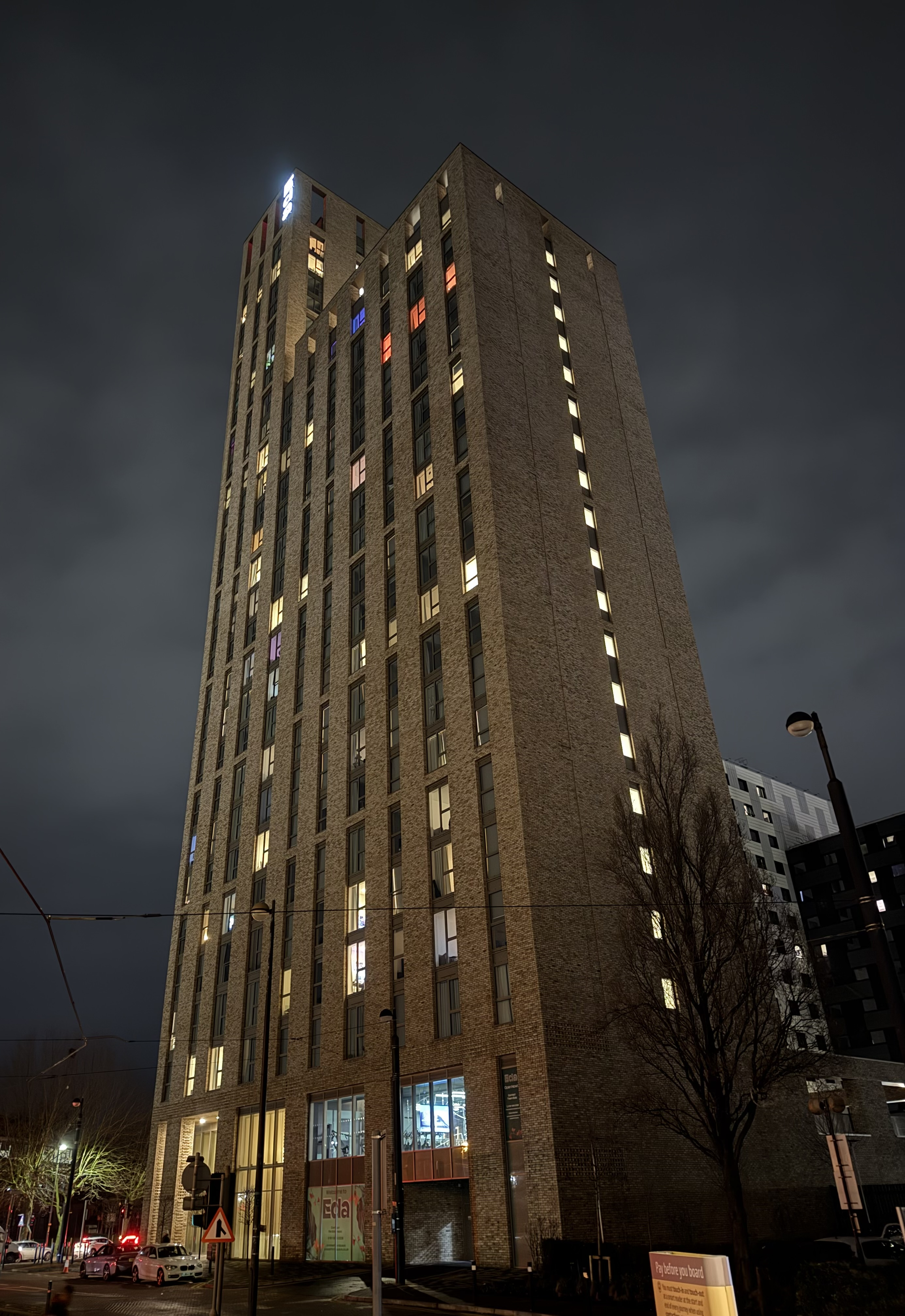
Eda at night, January 2025

=== Construction ===
Construction of Eda commenced in 2021 and the building was structurally topped out in April 2023. The tower comprises 29 storeys, made up of ground, mezzanine and 27 levels of built to rent apartments. It was anticipated to open in December 2023, but the building was completed in September 2023.

== Facilities ==
The tower also includes co-working spaces, a cinema room, landscaped podium garden, roof terrace, private dining suite and fitness studio.

Anchorage tram stop on the Eccles Line of the Metrolink system is located opposite Eda.

== See also ==
- List of tallest buildings and structures in Greater Manchester
- List of tallest buildings in the United Kingdom
