= Anchor Inn (Wheaton, Maryland) =

Defunct seafood restaurant

Coordinates: 39°2′30″N 77°3′8″W

Restaurant information
- Established: 1954
- Closed: 2004
- Food type: American fare
- Location: University Boulevard Avenue and Georgia Avenue, Wheaton, Montgomery, Maryland, USA

The Anchor Inn was a landmark restaurant opened in 1954 in the heart of Wheaton, Maryland located at the corner of University Boulevard West and Georgia Avenue. The restaurant was closed in 2004 and in May 2006 the restaurant was torn down to make way for a residential and retail mixed-use development.

== Food, drink, and atmosphere ==
When the Anchor Inn was still in business, its menu consisted mainly of American fare. Entrees were predominantly in the range of $12 to $20 and consisted of pasta, seafood, and steaks. It drew many customers who were looking for Chesapeake Bay seafood specialties such as oysters, shrimp, and crab cakes. The restaurant had however been criticized for being inconsistent and having generally worse food on the weekends when the crowds were heavier.

The Anchor Inn was one of the first six establishments to apply for and receive a liquor license in Montgomery County in December 1964. The county had just recently repealed by referendum a prohibition era law which allowed liquor to only be sold at three restaurants in the county.

The restaurant was also a favorite of locals who held special occasion dinners and club meetings at the venue. The Kiwanis Club of Wheaton held its meetings at the Anchor Inn on Wednesday afternoons and had a photograph of the Anchor Inn on the front page of their website. The Wheaton Chamber of Commerce held regular board meetings and the Silver Spring Business and Professional Women's Club held social events at the restaurant.

== Closing and redevelopment ==
In 2003, the owner of the Anchor Inn, Harry "Selby" Scaggs Sr., testified in front of the Montgomery County Council and Maryland State Legislators in Annapolis, Maryland indicating that a smoking ban, which was under consideration at the time, would hurt his business. After a smoking ban went into effect on October 9, 2003 in Montgomery County, Scaggs reported that his sales of Keno, beer, wine, liquor and food sales were down nearly 40% as customers flocked to nearby municipalities which still allowed smoking. On August 11, 2004, the Anchor Inn closed its doors for the last time citing the smoking ban as a major reason for its closure.

The property was sold to Greenhill Capital Corp. and developer Lenny Greenberg, CEO, who already owned a majority of the block on which the Anchor Inn was situated. The building was leased to Anthony Fahey who reopened the Anchor Inn on January 19, 2005, but again had to close only after a few months. The Anchor Inn building was subsequently demolished on May 8, 2006.

After initially indicating that the parcel which the Anchor Inn was situated would be used as part of a $50 million, 600,000 square foot (56,000 m^{2}) mixed use project, Greenberg and his team changed course and opted to build a standard strip mall due to a changing real estate environment. SIGAL Construction Corp. announced on August 31, 2007 that they had received the contract to build a new two story structure at the site where the Anchor Inn had once stood which they expected to complete by January 2008.

The site does however retain the Anchor Inn sign which has been renovated and now reads "Georgia Crossing at the Anchor Inn". The sign had originally read "Anchor Inn Seafood House & Lounge".
