= Del Ankers =

American cinematographer and director

- Born: August 1, 1916
- Died: May 15, 2008 (aged 91); Great Falls, Virginia
- Occupations: cinematographer; director; photographer; documentary
- Spouse: Maria Elizabeth Freire

Frank Lafayette "Del" Ankers (August 1, 1916 – May 15, 2008) was an American cinematographer, director, photographer and documentary producer. His career, which spanned photography and television, lasted for more than 50 years.

Ankers was known for his photographs of presidents of the United States ranging from Franklin D. Roosevelt to Richard Nixon. His other subjects included celebrities such as Grace Kelly, Soong Mei-ling, and Larry King. He also filmed commercials for both German and American television as a producer.

Among his most famous work as a producer and cinematographer were a series of shorts called Wilson's Meats Meeting, which he shot for Jim Henson during the mid-1960s. The shorts, which were called Wilson's Meats Meeting Film#1 (1965) and Wilson's Meats Meeting Film#2 (1965), featured some of Henson's early Muppets. Ankers also appeared on camera as himself in Wilson's Meats Meeting Film #1. He later shot Jim Henson's actual commercials for Wilson's Meats.

Examples of Ankers work can presently be seen in the archives of the Newseum and the National Cathedral, which are both located in Washington D.C.

Del Ankers died of congestive heart failure on May 15, 2008, at the age of 91 at his home in Great Falls, Virginia. He was survived by his wife, Maria Elizabeth Freire.
