= The Anchorage, Rhode Island =

The Anchorage
- Former CDP
- Location within the state of Rhode Island
- Coordinates: 41°31′48″N 71°18′21″W
- Country: United States
- State: Rhode Island
- Counties: Newport

Area
  - Land: 0.19 sq mi (0.5 km^{2})

Population (1970)
  - Total: 3,441
  - Density: 18,000/sq mi (6,900/km^{2})
- Time zone: UTC-5 (Eastern (EST))
  - Summer (DST): UTC-4 (EDT)
- ZIP code: 02885
- Area code: 401
- FIPS code: 44-69800

The Anchorage was a census-designated place in Newport County, Rhode Island during the 1970 United States census. The population in recorded was 3,441. The census area dissolved in 1980 and was never reorganized since. The ZIP code serving the area is 02885.

== Geography ==
Located at 41.529953 north and 71.305724 west, the census area of The Anchorage was located in the western part of the town of Middletown. The land area of the CDP was 0.2 square mile and had a population density of 17,205 persons per sq. mi.
