= List of women's rights activists =

Notable women's rights activists are as follows, arranged alphabetically by modern country names and then by surname:

== Afghanistan ==
- Farida Ahmadi (born 1957) – author and women's rights activist; imprisoned and tortured during the Soviet–Afghan War and founded "Women against Fundamentalism" in Norway
- Amina Azimi – disabled women's rights advocate
- Hasina Jalal – women's empowerment activist
- Quhramaana Kakar – Senior Strategic Advisor for Conciliation Resources
- Masuada Karokhi (born 1962) – Member of Parliament and women's rights campaigner
- Adela Mohseni, women's rights activist
- Zohra Rasekh (1969–2025) – doctor and women's rights activist; co-author of the report The Taliban's War on Women: A Health and Human Rights Crisis in Afghanistan

== Albania ==
- Evdhoksi Gërmenji (fl. 1921–1922) – women's rights activist and magazine editor
- Parashqevi Qiriazi (1880–1970) – teacher
- Sevasti Qiriazi (1871–1949) – pioneer of female education
- Urani Rumbo (1895–1936) – feminist, and playwright

== Algeria ==
- Aïcha Lemsine (born 1942) – French-language writer and women's rights activist
- Ahlam Mosteghanemi (born 1953) – writer and sociologist
- Zazi Sadou – women's rights activist and spokeswoman for the Algerian women's resistance movement; founding member of the Algerian Assembly of Democratic Women (AADW)

== Argentina ==
- Lucía Alberti (born 1944) – radical feminist and politician
- Virginia Bolten (1870–1960) – Argentine journalist as well as an anarchist and feminist activist of German descent
- Raymunda Torres y Quiroga – 19th-century Argentine writer and women's rights activist
- Azucena Villaflor (1924–1977) – social activist, a founder of the human rights association Mothers of the Plaza de Mayo

== Australia ==
- Thelma Bate (1904–1984) – community leader, advocate for inclusion of Aboriginals in Country Women's Association
- Rosie Batty (born 1962) – 2015 Australian of the Year and family violence campaigner
- Eva Cox (born 1938) – sociologist and feminist active in politics and social services, member of Women's Electoral Lobby, social commentator on women in power and at work, and social justice
- Zelda D'Aprano (1928–2018) – trade unionist, feminist, in 1969 chained herself to doors of Commonwealth Building over equal pay
- Louisa Margaret Dunkley (1866–1927) – telegraphist and labour organizer
- Elizabeth Evatt (born 1933) – legal reformist, jurist, critic of Australia's Sex Discrimination Act, first Australian in United Nations Commission on Human Rights
- Miles Franklin (1879–1954) – writer and feminist
- Vida Goldstein (1869–1949) – early Australian feminist campaigning for women's suffrage and social reform, first woman in British Empire to stand for national election
- Germaine Greer (born 1939) – author of The Female Eunuch, academic and social commentator
- Bella Guerin (1858–1923) – first woman to graduate from an Australian university; prominent socialist feminist (although with periods of public dispute) within the Australian Labor Party
- Louisa Lawson (1848–1920) – feminist, suffragist, author, founder of The Dawn, pro-republican federalist
- Fiona Patten (born 1964) – former leader of the Australian Sex Party, lobbyist for personal freedoms and progressive lifestyles
- Eileen Powell (1913–1997) – trade unionist, women's activist and contributor to the Equal Pay for Equal Work decision
- Millicent Preston-Stanley (1883–1955) – first female member of New South Wales Legislative Assembly, campaigner for custodial rights of mothers in divorce and for women's health care
- Elizabeth Anne Reid (born 1942) – world's first women's affairs adviser to head of government (Gough Whitlam), active in the United Nations and on HIV
- Bessie Rischbieth (1874–1967) – earliest female appointee to any court (honorary, Perth Children's Court, 1915), active against the Australian government practice of taking Aboriginal children from their mothers (Stolen Generation)
- Jessie Street (1889–1970) – Australian suffragette, feminist and human rights campaigner influential in labour rights and early days of the UN
- Anne Summers (born 1945) – women's rights activist in politics and media, women's advisor to Labor premier Paul Keating, editor of Ms. magazine (NY)
- Mary Hynes Swanton (1861–1940) – Australian women's rights and trade unionist

== Austria ==
- Auguste Fickert (1855–1910) – feminist and social reformer
- Marianne Hainisch (1839–1936) – activist, exponent of women's right to work and education
- Bertha Pappenheim (1859–1936) – Austrian-Jewish feminist, founder of the German Jewish Women's Association

== Azerbaijan ==
- Ayna Sultanova (1895–1938) – Communist party activist and statesperson
- Zuleikha Hasanova (1923–1985) – Communist party activist and statesperson
- Sakina Akhundzadeh (1865–1927) – educator and writer
- Khadija Alibeyova (1884–1961) – journalist, educator and advocate of women's rights
- Dilara Aliyeva (1929–1991) – philologist and political activist
- Sakina Aliyeva (1925–2010) – Communist party activist and statesperson
- Maryam Bayramalibeyova (1898– 1987) – educator and advocate of women's rights
- Jeyran Bayramova (1896–1987) – Communist party activist and statesperson
- Mirvarid Dilbazi (1912–2001) – educator and poet
- Shafiga Efendizadeh (1883–1959) – journalist, educator and advocate of women's rights
- Gulara Gadirbeyova (1903–1942) – journalist and advocate of women's rights
- Hamida Javanshir (1873–1955) – landlady, philanthropist and advocate of women's rights
- Novella Jafaroghlu (b. 1941) – politician and human rights defender

== Belgium ==
- Marguerite Coppin (1867–1931) – female Poet Laureate of Belgium and advocate of women's rights
- Joséphine Nyssens Keelhoff (1833–1917) – Belgian temperance and women's rights activist, feminist, editor
- Christine Loudes (1972–2016) – proponent of gender equality and women's rights
- Frédérique Petrides (1903–1983) – Belgian-American pioneer female orchestral conductor, activist and editor of Women in Music
- Marie Popelin (1846–1913) – lawyer, feminist campaigner, leader of the Belgian League for Women's Rights

== Benin ==
- Dossi Sekonou Gloria Agueh – founder and president of the Network of Women Leaders for Development

== Bosnia & Herzegovina ==
- Indira Bajramović – Roma activist, director of the Association of Roma Women from Tuzla
- Azra Hasanbegović – Bosnian women's rights activist who documented the suffering of women refuges from Mostar and Prozor in the Bosnian War and established women's organisations

== Botswana ==
- Unity Dow (born 1959) – judge and writer, plaintiff in case allowing children of mixed parentage to be deemed nationals

== Brazil ==
- Clara Ant (born 1948) – architect and political activist for the Partido dos Trabalhadores
- Márcia Campos (fl. 1970s) – democratic rights activist, president of the Women's International Democratic Federation
- Violante Atabalipa Ximenes de Bivar e Vellasco (1817–1875) – Brazilian feminist, writer and newspaper owner
- Albertina de Oliveira Costa (born 1943) – feminist activist, member of the Conselho Nacional dos Direitos da Mulher (National Council for Women's Rights)
- Jaqueline Jesus (born 1978) – LGBT rights activist
- Lily Marinho (1921–2011) – UNESCO Goodwill Ambassador for Brazil 1999–2011
- Míriam Martinho (born 1954) – leading feminist journalist and LGBT rights activist, known for her pioneering in Lesbian Feminism
- Laudelina de Campos Melo (1904–1991) – created the first trade association for domestic workers in Brazil
- Lucia Nader (born 1977) – human rights activist
- Matilde Ribeiro (born 1960) – political activist, feminist and part of the anit-racism movement in Brazil, as well as former Chief Minister of SEPPIR, a government agency promoting racial equality in Brazil
- Alzira Rufino (born 1949) – feminist, part of both the Black Movement and the Black Women's Movement
- Heleieth Saffioti (1934–2010) – feminist activist and sociology professor
- Miêtta Santiago (1903–1995) – suffragist, feminist activist, writer and poet
- Viviane Senna (born 1957) – president of the Instituto Ayrton Senna
- Yara Yavelberg (1943–1971) – university lecturer and part of the resistance against military dictatorship in Brazil

== Bulgaria ==
- Dimitrana Ivanova (1881–1960) – educational reformer and suffragist
- Ekaterina Karavelova (1860–1947) – suffragist and women's rights activist
- Anna Karima (1871–1949) – suffragist and women's rights activist
- Eugenia Kisimova (1831–1885) – feminist, philanthropist, women's rights activist
- Kina Konova (1872–1952) – publicist and suffragist
- Julia Malinova (1869–1953) – suffragist and founder of the Bulgarian Women's Union

== Burkina Faso ==
- Catherine Ouedraogo (born 1962) – social activist and environmental protection advocate

== Canada ==
- Edith Archibald (1854–1936) – suffragist, writer, promoter of Maritime Women's Christian Temperance Union, National Council of Women of Canada and Local Council of Women of Halifax
- Laura Borden (1861–1940) – president of the Local Council of Women of Halifax
- Thérèse Casgrain (1896–1981) – suffragette, reformer, feminist, politician and senator, mainly active in Quebec
- Françoise David (born 1948) – politician, feminist activist
- Emily Howard Stowe (1831–1903) – physician, advocate of women's inclusion in medical profession, founder of Canadian Women's Suffrage Association
- Marie Lacoste-Gérin-Lajoie (1867–1945) – suffragette, self-taught jurist
- Nellie McClung (1873–1951) – feminist and suffragist, part of The Famous Five (Canada)
- Jamie McIntosh (21st century) – lawyer and women's rights activist
- Eliza Ritchie (1856–1933) – prominent suffragist, executive member of Local Council of Women of Halifax
- Léa Roback (1903–2000) – feminist and workers' union activist tied with communist party
- Idola Saint-Jean (1880–1945) – suffragette, journalist
- Mary Two-Axe Earley (1911–1996) – indigenous women's rights activist
- Beverley Wybrow – established the Assaulted Women's Helpline in Toronto

== Cape Verde ==
- Isaura Gomes (born 1944)

== Chad ==
- Lydie Beassemda (born c. 1967)
- Céline Narmadji (born 1964)
- Halima Yakoy Adam (born 2000)

== Chile ==
- Alicia Herrera Rivera (1928–2013) – feminist lawyer and minister of the Court of Appeals of Santiago
- María Rivera Urquieta (born 1894) – professor and feminist

== China ==
- Cai Chang (1900–1990) – politician, first chair of the All-China Women's Federation
- Chen Xiefen (1883–1923) – feminist, revolutionary and journalist
- Fok Hing-tong (1872–1957)
- He Xiangning (1878–1972)
- Huixing (educator) (1871–1905)
- Jiang Shufang (1867–1928) – school pioneer
- Li Maizi (born 1989)
- Lin Zongsu (1878–1944)
- Liu-Wang Liming (1897–1970)
- Lü Jinghua (born 1960)
- Mao Hengfeng (born 1961)
- Miao Boying
- Nurungul Tohti (born 1980)
- Qiu Yufang (1871–1904)
- Wan Shaofen (born 1930)
- Wang Huiwu (1898–1993)
- Wei Tingting (born 1989)
- Xiang Jingyu
- Xie Xuehong (1901–1970)
- Ye Haiyan (born 1975)
- Zheng Churan

== Colombia ==
- Miriam Margoth Martínez (born 1966) – human rights defender
- Juana de J. Sarmiento (1899–1979) – Colombian politician, activist

== Croatia ==
- Jelica Belović-Bernardzikowska (1870–1946)
- Marija Jurić Zagorka (1873–1957)

== Democratic Republic of Congo ==
- Julienne Lusenge – women's activist, advocate for survivors of wartime sexual violence

== Denmark ==
- Widad Akrawi (born 1969) – writer and doctor, advocate for gender equality, women's empowerment and participation in peace-building and post-conflict governance
- Sophie Alberti (1846–1947) – pioneering women's rights activist and a leading member of Kvindelig Læseforening (Women Readers' Association)
- Johanne Andersen (1862–1925) – active in Funen and in the Danish Women's Society
- Ragnhild Nikoline Andersen (1907–1990) – trade unionist, Communist party politician and Stutthof prisoner
- Signe Arnfred (born 1944) – sociologist specializing in gender studies
- Matilde Bajer (1840–1934) – women's rights activist and pacifist
- Birgitte Berg Nielsen (1861–1951) – equal rights activist, educator
- Annestine Beyer (1795–1884) – pioneer of women's education
- Anne Bruun (1853–1934) – schoolteacher and women's rights activist
- Esther Carstensen (1873–1955) – women right's activist, journal editor, active in the Danish Women's Society
- Severine Casse (1805–1898) – women's rights activist, successful in fighting for a wife's right to dispose of her earnings
- Karen Dahlerup (1920–2018) – women's rights activist and politician
- Ulla Dahlerup (born 1942) – writer, women's rights activist, member of the Danish Red Stocking Movement
- Thora Daugaard (1874–1951) – women's rights activist, pacifist, editor
- Henni Forchhammer (1863–1955) – educator, feminist, peace activist
- Inger Gamburg (1892–1979) – trades unionist, Communist politician
- Suzanne Giese (1946–2012) – writer, women's rights activist, prominent member of the Red Stocking Movement
- Louise Glerup Aner [born 1972) – head of communications at Liv Uden Vold combating partner violence
- Bente Hansen (born 1940) – writer, supporter of the Red Stocking Movement
- Eline Hansen (1859–1919) – feminist and peace activist
- Estrid Hein (1873–1956) – ophthalmologist, women's rights activist, pacifist
- Eva Hemmer Hansen (1913–1983) – writer and feminist
- Dagmar Hjort (1860–1902) – schoolteacher, writer, women's rights activist
- Thora Ingemann Drøhse (1867–1948) – temperance campaigner and women's rights activist in Randers
- Katja Iversen (born 1969) – author, advisor, women's rights advocate, president of Women Deliver 2014–2020
- Thyra Jensen (1865–1949) – writer and women's rights activist in southern Schleswig
- Erna Juel-Hansen (1845–1922) – novelist, early women's rights activist
- Thora Knudsen (1861–1950) – nurse, women's rights activist and philanthropist
- Lene Koch (born 1947) – gender studies researcher
- Nynne Koch (1915–2001) – pioneering women's studies researcher
- Anna Laursen (1845–1911) – educator, head of the Aarhus branch of the Danish Women's Society
- Anna Lohse (1866–1942) – Odense schoolteacher and women's rights activist
- Line Luplau (1823–1891) – feminist, suffragist, founder of the Danish Women's Suffrage Society
- Elisabeth Møller Jensen (born 1946) – historian, feminist, director of Kvinfo 1990–2014
- Else Moltke (1888–1986) – writer and leader of women's discussion group in Copenhagen
- Elna Munch (1871–1845) – feminist, politician, co-founder of the Danish Association for Women's Suffrage
- Louise Nørlund (1854–1919) – feminist, pacifist, founder of the Danish Women's Suffrage Society
- Charlotte Norrie (1855–1940) – nurse, women's rights activist, voting rights campaigner
- Voldborg Ølsgaard (1877–1939) – women's rights and peace activist
- Tania Ørum (born 1945) – women's research activist, literary historian
- Thora Pedersen (1875–1954) – educator, school inspector, women's rights activist who fought for equal pay for men and women
- Johanne Rambusch (1865–1944) – feminist, politician, co-founder of the radical suffrage association Landsforbundet for Kvinders Valgret
- Caja Rude (1884–1949) – novelist, journalist and women's rights activist
- Vibeke Salicath (1861–1921) – philanthropist, feminist, editor, politician
- Astrid Stampe Feddersen (1852–1930) – chaired first Scandinavian meeting on women's rights
- Karen Syberg (born 1945) – writer, feminist, co-founder of the Red Stocking Movement
- Caroline Testman (1839–1919) – feminist, co-founder of Dansk Kvindesamfund
- Ingeborg Tolderlund (1848–1935) – women's rights activist and suffragist
- Clara Tybjerg (1864–1941) – women's rights activist, pacifist
- Anna Westergaard (1882–1964) – railway official, trade unionist, women's rights activist, politician
- Louise Wright (1861–1935) – philanthropist, feminist, peace activist
- Natalie Zahle (1827–1913) – pioneer of women's education
- Else Zeuthen (1897–1975) – Danish pacifist, women's rights activist and politician

=== Greenland ===
- Aviâja Egede Lynge (born 1974) – educator, activist for indigenous peoples and women's rights
- Henriette Rasmussen (1950–2017) – educator, journalist, women's rights activist and politician

== East Timor ==
- Magdalena Bidau Soares – ex-guerrilla, peace activist

== Ecuador ==
- Geraldina Guerra Garcés (born 1975) – campaigner against femicide
- Rosa Zárate y Ontaneda (1763–1813) – feminist and independence activist

== Egypt ==
- Qasim Amin (1863–1908) – jurist, early advocate of women's rights in society
- Soraya Bahgat (born 1983) – Egyptian-Finnish women's rights advocate, social entrepreneur and founder of Tahrir Bodyguard
- Ihsan El-Kousy (born 1900) – headmistress, writer and rights activist
- Nawal el-Saadawi (1931–2021) – writer and doctor, advocate of women's health and equality
- Entisar Elsaeed (fl. 2000s) – activist fighting female genital mutilation and domestic abuse
- Engy Ghozlan (born 1985) – coordinator of campaigns against sexual harassment
- Hoda Shaarawi (1879–1947) – feminist organizer of Mubarrat Muhammad Ali (women's social service organization), Union of Educated Egyptian Women, and Wafdist Women's Central Committee, founder president of Egyptian Feminist Union

== Estonia ==
- Elisabeth Howen (1834–1923) – women's educational pioneer

== Finland ==
- Hanna Andersin (1861–1914) – educator, feminist
- Soraya Bahgat (born 1983) – see Egypt
- Elisabeth Blomqvist (1827–1901) – pioneering female educator
- Minna Canth (1844–1897) – writer, women's rights proponent
- Adelaïde Ehrnrooth (1826–1905) – feminist, writer, early fighter for voting rights
- Alexandra Gripenberg (1857–1913) – writer, women's rights activist, treasurer of the International Council of Women
- Lucina Hagman (1853–1946) – feminist, politician, pacifist, president of the League of Finnish Feminists
- Rosina Heikel (1842–1929) – feminist, first medical doctor in Finland
- Alma Hjelt (1853–1907) – gymnast, women's rights activist, chair of the Finnish women's association Suomen Naisyhdistyksen
- Hilda Käkikoski (1864–1912) – suffragist, writer, schoolteacher, early politician

== France ==
- Isnelle Amelin (1907–1994) – feminist and trade unionist from La Réunion
- Hubertine Auclert (1848–1914) – feminist activist, suffragette
- Simone de Beauvoir (1908–1986) – philosopher, writer
- Marie-Thérèse Lucidor Corbin (1749–1834) – French Creole activist and abolitionist in the French colonies
- Charles Fourier (1772–1837) – philosopher
- Françoise Giroud (1916–2003) – journalist, writer, politician
- Olympe de Gouges (1748–1793) – playwright and political activist who wrote the 1791 Declaration of the Rights of Woman and of the Female Citizen
- Blanche Moria (1858–1927) – sculptor, educator, feminist
- Ndella Paye (born c. 1974) – Senegal-born militant Afro-feminist and Muslim theologian
- Maria Pognon (1844–1925) – writer, feminist, suffragist, pacifist
- Alphonse Rebière (1842–1900) – author of Les Femmes dans la science and advocate for women's scientific abilities
- Léonie Rouzade (1839–1916) – journalist, novelist, feminist
- Anne-Josèphe Théroigne de Méricourt (1762–1817) – politician
- Flora Tristan (1803–1844) – French-Peruvian activist, early advocate of socialism and feminism
- Jane Valbot (1884–1961) – pacifist, suffragist and women's rights activist
- Louise Weiss (1893–1983) – journalist, writer, politician

== Germany ==
- Jenny Apolant (1874–1925) – Jewish feminist, suffragist
- Ruth Bré (c. 1862/67–1911) – writer, advocate of matrilineality and women's rights, founder of Bund für Mutterschutz (League for Maternity Leave)
- Johanna Elberskirchen (1864–1943) – feminist and activist for women's rights, gays and lesbians
- Johanna von Evreinov (1844–1919) – Russian-born German feminist writer, pioneering female lawyer and editor
- Helene von Forster (1859–1923) – women's rights activist and author
- Lida Gustava Heymann (1868–1943) – feminist, pacifist and women's rights activist
- Luise Koch (1860–1934) – educator, women's rights activist, suffragist, politician
- Helene Lange (1848–1930) – educator, pioneering women's rights activist, suffragist
- Sigrid Metz-Göckel (1940–2025) – sociologist, gender studies academic
- Ursula G. T. Müller (born 1940) – sociologist, gender studies academic
- Louise Otto-Peters (1819–1895) – suffragist, women's rights activist, writer
- Sophie Rogge-Börner (1878–1955) – journalist, ethnic feminist and nationalist
- Alice Salomon (1872–1948) – social reformer, women's rights activist, educator, writer
- Käthe Schirmacher (1865–1930) – early women's rights activist, writer
- Auguste Schmidt (1833–1902) – pioneering women's rights activist, educator, journalist
- Alice Schwarzer (born 1942) – journalist and publisher of the magazine Emma
- Gesine Spieß (1945–2016) – educationalist specializing in gender studies
- Pauline Staegemann (1838–1909) – socialist, feminist and trade unionist, lead the women's organisations Berlin Workers' Wives' and Girls' Association and the Association for the Protection of Female Workers' Interests
- Marie Stritt (1855–1928) – women's rights activist, suffragist, co-founder of the International Alliance of Women
- Johanna Vogt (1862–1944) – suffragist, first woman on the city council of Kassel starting in 1919
- Martha Voß-Zietz (1871–1961) – women's rights activist, suffragist, nationalist and writer
- Marianne Weber (1870–1954) – sociologist, women's rights activist, writer
- Clara Zetkin (1857–1933) – Marxist theorist, women's rights activist, suffragist, politician

== Ghana ==
- Annie Jiagge (1918–1996) – lawyer, judge, women's rights activist, drafted Declaration on the Elimination of Discrimination Against Women, co-founded Women's World Banking

== Greece ==
- Kalliroi Parren (1861–1940) – founder of the Greek women's movement
- Avra Theodoropoulou (1880–1963) – music critic, pianist, suffragist, women's rights activist, nurse

== Haiti ==
- Léonie Coicou Madiou (1891–1974) – political activist, feminist, educator
- Rosemonde Pierre-Louis – activist, educator and attorney for women's and immigrant rights

== Hungary ==
- Clotilde Apponyi (1867–1942) – suffragist
- Enikő Bollobás (born 1952) – academic specializing in women's studies
- Sarolta Geőcze (1862–1928) – Christian socialist women's rights activist and educator
- Vilma Glücklich (1872–1927) – educational reformer and women's rights activist
- Teréz Karacs (1808–1892) – writer and women's rights activist
- Rosika Schwimmer (1877–1948) – feminist, suffragist, World Peace Prize (1937)
- Éva Takács (1780–1845) – writer and feminist
- Blanka Teleki (1806–1862) – feminist and advocate of female education
- Pálné Veres (1815–1895) – founder of Hungarian National Association for Women's Education

== Iceland ==
- Ingibjörg H. Bjarnason (1867–1941) – politician, suffragist, schoolteacher, gymnast
- Bríet Bjarnhéðinsdóttir (1856–1940) – activist for women's liberation and women's suffrage
- Þórunn Jónassen (1850–1922) – active member of the women's movement
- Katrín Magnússon (1858–1932) – promoter of women's voting rights and women's education

== India ==
- Mamatha Raghuveer Achanta (born 1967) – women's and child rights activist, chair of Child Welfare Committee, Warangal District, active in A.P. State Commission for Protection of Child Rights, founder director of Tharuni, focusing on girl-child and women empowerment
- Angellica Aribam (born 1992) – political activist, founder of Femme First Foundation
- Annie Basil (1911–1995) – Iranian-Indian activist for Armenian women
- Yogita Bhayana – Indian anti-sexual violence activist and head of People Against Rape in India
- Margaret "Gretta" Cousins (1878–1954) – Irish-Indian suffragist, established All India Women's Conference, co-founded Irish Women's Franchise League
- Madhusree Dutta (born 1959) – co-founder of Majlis, Mumbai, author, cultural activist, filmmaker, curator
- Rehana Fathima (born 1986) – women's rights activist
- Nazli Gegum (1874–1968) – Indian girl education activist
- Ruchira Gupta (born 1964) – journalist and activist; founder of Apne Aap, a non-governmental organization that works for women's rights and the eradication of sex trafficking
- Sunil Jaglan (born 1982) – founder of Selfie With Daughter, Indian social activist
- Sneha Jawale (born 1977) – social worker and activist for the visibility of violence against women
- Kirthi Jayakumar (born 1987) – founder of The Red Elephant Foundation, rights activist, campaigner against violence against women
- Shruti Kapoor – women's rights activist, economist, social entrepreneur
- Sunitha Krishnan (born 1972) – Indian social activist, co-founder of Prajwala which assists trafficked women, girls and transgender people in finding shelter, education and employment
- Swati Maliwal (born 1984) – women's activist, worked toward the passage of an ordinance requiring the death penalty for individuals who rape children under age 12, recruiting police under United Nations standards and demanding accountability of the police
- Subodh Markandeya – senior advocate
- Manasi Pradhan (born 1962) – founder of nationwide Honour for Women National Campaign against violence to women

== Indonesia ==
- Electronita Duan – founder of Politeknik Pembangunan Halmahera
- Raden Adjeng Kartini (1879–1904) – Javanese advocate for native Indonesian women, critic of polygamy and lack of women's education
- Valentina Sagala (born 1977) – women's rights activist
- Nani Soewondo-Soerasno (born 1918) – lawyer, suffragist, and women's rights activist

== Iran ==
- Badr al-Maluk Bamdad (1898–1987) – Iranian journalist, teacher, women's rights activist
- Mahboubeh Abbasgholizadeh (born 1958) – women's rights activist, founder of ZananTV and NGO Training Center
- Saba Kord Afshari
- Parvin Ardalan (born 1967) – women's rights activist
- Bibi Khanoom Astarabadi (1859–1921) – writer
- Annie Basil (1911–1995) – Iranian-Indian activist for Armenian women
- Sediqeh Dowlatabadi (1882–1962) – journalist and women's rights activist
- Shirin Ebadi (born 1947) – activist, Nobel Peace Prize winner for efforts for rights of women and children
- Mohtaram Eskandari (1895–1924) – women's rights activist, founder of Jam'iat e nesvan e vatan-khah" (Society of Patriotic Women)
- Soheila Hejab (born 1990)
- Sheema Kalbasi (born 1972) – writer, advocate for human rights and gender equality
- Noushin Ahmadi Khorasani (born 1970) – women's rights activist
- Rayehe Mozafarian (born 1986) – women's rights activist, author, documentary filmmaker
- Shadi Sadr (born 1975) – women's rights activist
- Shahla Sherkat (born 1956) – journalist
- Táhirih (died 1852) – Bábí poet, theologian, exponent of women's rights in 19th century
- Roya Toloui (born 1966) – women's rights activist

== Iraq ==
- Asia Tawfiq Wahbi (1901–1980) – writer and social reformer; inaugurated the first feminist union in Iraq, the al-Ittihad al-Nisai (Iraqi Women's Union)

== Ireland ==
- Hilary Boyle (1899–1988) – journalist, broadcaster, and activist
- Margaret "Gretta" Cousins (1878–1954) – see India
- Anna Haslam (1829–1922) – early women's movement figure, founded the Dublin Women's Suffrage Association
- Francis Hutcheson (1694–1746) – philosopher born to activist family of Scots Presbyterians, opponent of slavery and advocate of women's rights
- Sarah Winstedt (1886–1972) – physician, surgeon and suffragist

== Israel ==
- Ketzia Alon (born 1971) – academic, social activist, Mizrahi feminist, art curator and critic; one of the founders of the Ahoti – for Women in Israel movement
- Esther Eillam (1939–2023) – founder of the Feminist Movement organization; Mizrahi second wave and Mizrahi feminism activist
- Carmen Elmakiyes (born 1979) – social and political activist, Mizrahi feminist; works on behalf of women in public housing
- Marcia Freedman (1938–2021) – founder of Israel's feminist movement (1971); politician, social activist and writer
- Anat Hoffman (born 1954) – executive director, Israel Religious Action Center; director and founding member, Women of the Wall
- Shula Keshet (born 1959) – social and political activist and entrepreneur, Mizrahi feminist, artist, curator, writer, educator, and publisher; one of the founders and the executive director of the Ahoti – for Women in Israel
- Vicki Knafo (born 1960) – social activist; led the 2003 single-mothers struggle against austerity decrees
- Reut Naggar (born 1983) – producer, cultural entrepreneur and social activist, mainly focusing on LGBT and women's rights
- Vicki Shiran (1947–2004) – one of the founders of the Mizrahi feminism movement
- Iris Stern Levi (born 1953) – activist for rehabilitation of trafficked women

== Italy ==
- Alma Dolens (1869–1948) – pacifist, suffragist and journalist, founder of several women's organizations
- Linda Malnati (1855–1921) – women's rights activist, trade unionist, suffragist, pacifist and writer
- Anna Maria Mozzoni (1837–1920) – pioneering women's rights activist and suffragist
- Eugenia Rasponi Murat (1873–1958) – women's rights activist and open lesbian who fought for civil protections
- Daisy di Robilant (died 1933) – noblewoman, fascist and campaigner for children's and women's rights
- Gabriella Rasponi Spalletti (1853–1931) – feminist, educator and philanthropist, founder of the National Council of Italian Women in 1903
- Laura Terracina (1519–c.1577) – widely published poet, writer, protested violence against women and promoted women's writing

== Japan ==
- Raicho Hiratsuka (1886–1971)
- Yajima Kajiko (1833–1925)
- Sayaka Osakabe (born 1978)
- Umeko Tsuda (1864–1929)

== Jordan ==
- Hadeel Abdel Aziz

== Kazakhstan ==
- Bakhytzhan Toregozhina (born 1962)

== Kenya ==
- Hubbie Hussein Al-Haji (born 1958)-Advocate for women's rights to control water rights, advocate against FGM
- Marylize Biubwa – intersectional feminist and activist
- Nice Nailantei Leng'ete (born 1991) – advocate for alternative rite of passage (ARP) for girls in Africa and campaigning to stop female genital mutilation (FGM)
- Wangari Maathai (1940–2011) – social, environmental and political activist, the first African woman to win the Nobel Peace Prize

== Latvia ==
- Berta Pīpiņa (1883–1942)

== Lebanon ==
- Laure Moghaizel (1929–1997) – lawyer and women's rights advocate

== Libya ==
- Alaa Murabit (born 1989) – physician, advocate of inclusive security, peace-building and post-conflict governance

== Lithuania ==
- Felicija Bortkevičienė (1873–1945)
- Sofija Kymantaitė-Čiurlionienė (1886–1958)
- Ona Mašiotienė (1883–1949)

== Luxembourg ==
- Marguerite Mongenast-Servais (1885–1925)
- Netty Probst (1903–1990)
- Catherine Schleimer-Kill (1884–1973)
- Marguerite Thomas-Clement (1886–1979)

== Mali ==
- Jacqueline Ki-Zerbo (1933–2015) – activist, nationalist and educator

== Mauritania ==
- Zeinebou Mint Taleb Moussa

== Namibia ==
- Monica Geingos
- Gwen Lister
- Rosa Namises

== Netherlands ==
- Ayaan Hirsi Ali (born 1969) – see Somalia
- Wilhelmina Drucker (1847–1925) – politician and writer
- Mariane van Hogendorp (1834–1909)
- Mietje Hoitsema (1847–1934)
- Cornélie Huygens (1848–1902) – writer, social democrat and feminist
- Aletta Jacobs (1854–1929) – physician and women's suffrage activist
- Charlotte Jacobs
- Jeltje Kemper
- Selma Meyer
- Anette Poelman
- Cornelia Ramondt-Hirschmann

== New Zealand ==
- Kate Sheppard (1848–1934) – suffragette, influential in winning voting rights for women in 1893 (first country and national election in which women could vote)

== Nigeria ==
- Priscilla Achapka – women and gender environmental activist
- Dayo Benjamins-Laniyi (born 1965) – women in politics, women and girl-child rights and environmental activist
- Osai Ojigho (born 1976) – human rights and gender equality advocate
- Funmilayo Ransome-Kuti (1900–1978) – women's rights activist

== Norway ==
- Marit Aarum (1903–1956) – economist, politician, activist
- Irene Bauer (1945–2016) – government official, activist
- Anna Louise Beer (1924–2010) – lawyer, judge, activist
- Margunn Bjørnholt (born 1958) – sociologist, economist, gender researcher, activist
- Randi Blehr (1851–1928) – feminist, co-founder of the Norwegian Association for Women's Rights
- Karin Maria Bruzelius (born 1941) – Swedish-born Norwegian judge, government official, rights activist
- Nicoline Hambro (1861–1926) – politician, women's rights proponent
- Siri Hangeland (born 1952) – politician, activist
- Aasta Hansteen (1824–1908) – painter, writer, feminist
- Sigrun Hoel (born 1951) – government official, activist
- Anniken Huitfeldt (born 1969) – historian, politician, reported on women's rights
- Grethe Irvoll (born 1939) – political supporter of women's rights
- Martha Larsen Jahn (1875–1954) – peace and women's activist
- Dakky Kiær (1892–1980) – politician, civic leader, activist
- Betzy Kjelsberg (1866–1950) – right's activist, suffragist, politician
- Eva Kolstad (1918–1999) – politician, minister, proponent of gender equality
- Gina Krog (1947–1916) – proponent of women's right to education, politician, editor
- Berit Kvæven (born 1942) – politician, activist
- Aadel Lampe (1857–1944) – women's rights leader, suffragist, teacher
- Antonie Løchen (1850–1933) – local politician and women's rights activist from Trondheim
- Mimi Sverdrup Lunden (1894–1955) – educator, writer, women's rights proponent
- Fredrikke Mørck (1861–1934) – editor, teacher, activist
- Ragna Nielsen (1845–1924) – headmistress, politician, activist
- Marit Nybakk (born 1947) – politician, activist
- Amalie Øvergaard (1874–1960) – women's leader, active in housewives associations
- Kjellaug Pettersen (1843–1938) – politician, founder of the Norwegian Women's Public Health Association
- Kjellaug Pettersen (1934–2012) – government official, politician, gender equality proponent
- Ingerid Gjøstein Resi (1901–1955) – philologist, women's rights leader, politician
- Torild Skard (born 1936) – psychologist, politician, women's rights leader
- Kari Skjønsberg (1926–2003) – academic, writer, activist
- Dagmar Karin Sørbøe (born 1945), physiotherapist and women's rights activist
- Anna Stang (1834–1901) – politician, women's rights leader
- Sigrid Stray (1893–1978) – lawyer, women's rights proponent
- Signe Swensson (1888–1974) – physician, politician, women's leader
- Thina Thorleifsen (1855–1959) – women's movement activist
- Clara Tschudi (1856–1945) – writer, biographer of women's rights activists
- Vilhelmine Ullmann (1816–1915) – pedagogue, writer, women's rights proponent
- Grethe Værnø (born 1938) – politician, writer, national and international women's rights supporter
- Margrethe Vullum (1846–1918) – Danish-born Norwegian journalist, writer, women's rights proponent
- Fredrikke Waaler (1865–1952) – musician, activist
- Gunhild Ziener (1868–1937) – pioneer in the women's movement, editor

== Pakistan ==
- Gulalai Ismail (born 1986) – Pashtun women's rights activist campaigning in the Pashtun Tahafuz Movement, and founder of Aware Girls
- Fatima Lodhi (born 1989) – Pakistani women's rights activist who addressed colorism
- Zubeida Habib Rahimtoola (1917–2015) – member of All Pakistan Women's Association
- Malala Yousafzai (born 1997) – Pakistani women's rights activist shot in assassination attempt by Taliban for advocating for girls' education, now in UK

== Panama ==
- Lamar Bailey Karamañites (dates unknown) – filmmaker, activist
- Esther Neira de Calvo (1890–1978) – educator and politician
- Elida Campodónico (1894–1960) – teacher, attorney, suffragist
- Tomasa Ester Casís (1878–1962) – teacher and suffragist
- Georgina Jiménez de López (1904–1994) – sociologist, writer, feminist
- Marta Matamoros (1909–2005) – trade unionist, dressmaker, political activist for gender equality
- Gumercinda Páez (1904–1991) – teacher, suffragist, politician
- Sara Sotillo (1900–1961) – educator, trade unionist, founder of National Feminist Party of Panama

== Peru ==
- María Jesús Alvarado Rivera

== Philippines ==
- Risa Hontiveros-Baraquel
- Liza Maza
- Teresita Quintos Deles

== Poland ==
- Maria Konopnicka
- Ernestine Rose (1810–1892) – Polish-born woman's rights activist, atheist, abolitionist and suffragist

== Portugal ==
- Carolina Beatriz Ângelo
- Sara Beirão
- Cesina Bermudes
- Adelaide Cabete
- Ana de Castro Osório
- Elina Guimarães
- Lutegarda Guimarães de Caires (1873–1935) – poet and women's rights activist
- Maria Lamas

== Romania ==
- Maria Baiulescu (1860–1941) – Austro-Hungarian born Romanian writer, suffragist and women's rights activist
- Calypso Botez (1880–1933) – writer, suffragist and women's rights activist
- Alexandrina Cantacuzino (1876–1944) – political activist, feminist, philanthropist and diplomat
- Maria Cuțarida-Crătunescu (1857–1919) – first female doctor in Romania, feminist supporter, founded the Maternal Society in 1897, and in 1899 organised the first crèche in Romania
- Cecilia Cuțescu-Storck (1879–1969) – painter and feminist
- Eugenia de Reuss Ianculescu (1866–1938) – teacher, writer, women's rights activist, suffragist
- Clara Maniu (1842–1929) – feminist, suffragist
- Elena Meissner (1867–1940) – feminist, suffragist, headed Asociația de Emancipare Civilă și Politică a Femeii Române
- Sofia Nădejde (1856–1946) – writer, women's rights activist and socialist
- Ella Negruzzi (1876–1948) – lawyer and women's rights activist
- Elena Pop-Hossu-Longin (1862–1940) – Austro-Hungarian-born Romanian writer, journalist, suffragist and women's rights activist
- Izabela Sadoveanu-Evan (1870–1941) – literary critic, educationist, journalist, poet and feminist militant
- Ilona Stetina (1855–1932) – pioneer educator and women's rights activist

== Russia ==
- Praskovia Arian (1864–1949) – writer and journalist
- Maria Bezobrazova (1857–1914) – philosopher and writer
- Maria Chekhova (1866–1934) – suffragette and socialist activist
- Anna Filosofova (1837–1912) – early women's rights activist, member of "triumvirate"
- Zinaida Ivanova (1865–1913) – translator and writer
- Evgenia Konradi (1838–1898) – early women's rights activist and writer
- Tatiana Mamonova (born 1943) – author, non-profit founder, and artist
- Poliksena Shishkina-Iavein (1875–1947) – physician and suffragette
- Nadezhda Stasova (1822–1895) – early women's rights activist, member of "triumvirate"
- Maria Trubnikova (1835–1897) – early women's rights activist, member of "triumvirate"

== Saint Vincent and the Grenadines ==
- Nafesha Richardson (born 1996) – women's rights' advocate, youth activist and climate activist
- Nelcia Robinson-Hazell – poet, community organizer and activist

== Saudi Arabia ==
- Loujain al-Hathloul (born 1989) – women's rights leader, social media influencer, political prisoner
- Fawzia al-Otaibi, Maryam al-Otaibi and Manahel al-Otaibi – sisters who are women's and human rights activists

== Serbia ==
- Ksenija Atanasijević (1894–1981) – philosopher, suffragette, first PhD doctor in Serbian universities
- Helen of Anjou, Queen of Serbia (1236–1314) – queen, feminist, establisher of women schools
- Jefimija (1349–1405) – politician, poet, diplomat, feminist
- Draga Ljočić (1855–1926) – physician, socialist, and feminist
- Milica of Serbia (1335–1405) – empress, feminist, poet
- Katarina Milovuk (1844–1913) – educator and women's rights activist
- Milunka Savić (1888–1973) – first female combatant, soldier, feminist
- Stasa Zajovic (born 1953) – co-founder and coordinator of Women in Black

== Slovenia ==
- Alojzija Štebi (1883–1956) – suffragist, saw socialism as a means of equalizing society for both men and women

== Somalia ==
- Halima Ali Adan – Somali gender rights activist, an expert on female genital mutilation (FGM)
- Ayaan Hirsi Ali (born 1969) – Somali-Dutch feminist and atheist activist, writer and politician

== South Africa ==
- Shamima Shaikh (1960–1998) – member of the Muslim Youth Movement of South Africa, exponent of Islamic gender equality
- Colette Solomon – policy researcher, women's rights activist and the director of the feminist non-governmental organisation Women on Farms Project (WFP)

== South Korea ==
- Choi Young-ae (born 1951) – winner of 2014 Seoul Gender Equality Award
- Lee In-hwi (born 1958) – author whose anti-capitalist novels have promoted women's labor rights

== Spain ==
- Concepción Arenal (1820–1893) – feminist and activist
- Clara Campoamor (1888–1972) – politician and feminist
- Montserrat Cervera Rodon (born 1949) – Catalan anti-militarist, feminist, and women's health activist

== Sri Lanka ==
- Rupika De Silva – women's rights activist
- Saila Ithayaraj (born 1977) – women's rights activist, especially for widows
- Shreen Abdul Saroor (born 1969) – women's rights activist

== Sudan ==
- Thuraya al-Tuhamy (1948–2020) – women's rights activist and magazine employee

== Sweden ==
- Gertrud Adelborg (1853–1942) – teacher, leading member of the women's rights movement
- Sophie Adlersparre (1823–1895) – publisher, women's rights activist, pioneer
- Alma Åkermark (1853–1933) – editor, journalist, activist
- Ellen Anckarsvärd (1833–1898) – women's rights activist, co-founded Föreningen för gift kvinnas äganderätt (Married Woman's Property Rights Association)
- Carolina Benedicks-Bruce (1856–1935) – sculptor, rights activist
- Ellen Bergman (1842–1921) – musician, rights activist
- Fredrika Bremer (1801–1865) – writer, feminist activist and pioneer
- Frigga Carlberg (1851–1925) – writer, feminist and women's suffragist
- Maria Cederschiöld (1856–1935) – journalist and women's rights activist
- Josefina Deland (1814–1890) – feminist, writer, teacher, founded Svenska lärarinnors pensionsförening (Society for Retired Female Teachers)
- Lizinka Dyrssen (1866–1952) – women's rights activist
- Ebba von Eckermann (1866–1960) – women's rights activist
- Lilly Engström (1843–1921) – women's rights activist, government official
- Soheila Fors (born 1967) – Iranian-Swedish women's rights activist
- Maja Forsslund (1878–1967) – women's rights activist and folklorist
- Ruth Gustafson (1881–1960) – politician, trade unionist, women's rights activist, editor
- Ellen Hagen (1873–1967) – suffragette, rights activist, politician
- Anna Hierta-Retzius (1841–1924) – women's rights activist and philanthropist
- Lina Hjort (1881–1959) – schoolteacher, house builder and suffragist
- Amanda Kerfstedt (1835–1920) – writer, active in the women's rights movement
- Ellen Key (1849–1926) – writer, leading member of the women's rights movement
- Ellen Kleman (1867–1943) – writer, journal editor, women's rights activist
- Lotten von Kræmer (1828–1912) – writer, poet, philanthropist, founder of literary society Samfundet De Nio
- Elisabeth Krey-Lange (1878–1965) – women's rights activist and journalist
- Lisbeth Larsson (1949–2021) – literary historian focusing on gender studies
- Rosa Malmström (1906–1995) – librarian and feminist
- Sara Mohammad (born 1967) – Iraqi Kurdish-born Swedish human rights activist campaigning against honour killing
- Agda Montelius (1850–1920) – philanthropist feminist, suffrage activist, chairman of the Fredrika Bremer Association
- Rosalie Olivecrona (1823–1898) – pioneer of the women's rights movement
- Ellen Palmstierna (1869–1941) – women's rights and peace activist
- Gulli Petrini (1867–1941) – suffragette, women's rights activist, politician
- Anna Pettersson (1886–1929) – lawyer and pioneer in legal advice to women
- Eva Pineus (1905–1985) – librarian, politician and activist
- Emilie Rathou (1862–1948) – journalist, editor, activist
- Hilda Sachs (1857–1935) – journalist, writer and feminist
- Sophie Sager (1825–1902) – women's rights activist and writer
- Anna Sandström (1854–1931) – educational reformer
- Ida Schmidt (1857–1932) – women's rights activist, educator, politician
- Alexandra Skoglund (1862–1938) – suffragette, activist, politician
- Frida Stéenhoff (1865–1945) – writer, women's rights activist
- Elisabeth Tamm (1880–1958) – politician, women's rights activist
- Kajsa Wahlberg – Sweden's national rapporteur on human trafficking opposition activities
- Anna Whitlock (1852–1930) – school pioneer, journalist and feminist

== Switzerland ==
- Marianne Ehrmann (1755–1795) – among first women novelists and publicists in German-speaking countries
- Margarethe Faas-Hardegger (1882–1963) – Swiss women's rights activist and trade unionist
- Elisabeth Flühmann (1851–1929) – Swiss teacher and women's rights activist
- Marie Goegg-Pouchoulin (1826–1899) – founder of the Swiss women's movement

== Tunisia ==
- Néziha Zarrouk (born 1946) – minister who contributed to improvements in women's rights and women's health

== Turkey ==
- Nezihe Muhiddin – feminist, founded a women's party
- Sebahat Tuncel – women's rights activist, former nurse and member of Parliament in Turkey

== Uganda ==
- Barbara Allimadi (1972–2020) – activist known for organising the "bra protest"
- Jane Frances Kuka (1952 or 1953 – 2025) – legislator, Member of Parliament and anti-FGM activist

== United Kingdom ==
- Lesley Abdela (born 1945) – women's rights campaigner, gender consultant, journalist who has worked for women's representation in over forty countries
- Clementina Black (1853–1922) – writer prominent in the Women's Trade Union League and the forerunner of the Women's Industrial Council
- Helen Blackburn (1842–1903) – suffragist and campaigner for women's employment rights
- Barbara Bodichon (1827–1891) – active in the Langham Place Circle, promoter of first journal to press for women's rights, the English Woman's Journal (1858–64)
- Jessie Boucherett (1825–1905) – co-founder of Society for Promoting the Employment of Women in 1859, editor of Englishwoman's Review (1866–70), co-founder of Women's Employment Defence League in 1891
- Myra Sadd Brown (1872–1938) – suffragette, activist for women's rights and internationalist
- Constance Bryer (1870–1952) – suffragette who went on hunger strike and was forcibly fed
- Laura Ormiston Chant (1848–1923) – social reformer, women's rights activist, writer, and member of the International Council of Women (1888)
- Adeline Chapman (1847–1931) – English suffragette and president of the New Constitutional Society for Women's Suffrage (a middle ground between the militant suffragists and the NUWSS)
- Ida Craft (fl. 1910s) – suffragist, among main organizers of Suffrage Hikes
- Emily Davison (1872–1913) – English suffragette
- June Eric-Udorie (born 1998) – anti-FGM (female genital mutilation) campaigner
- Kate Williams Evans (1866–1961) – suffragette and activist for women's rights
- Millicent Fawcett (1847–1929) – suffragist and feminist, president of National Union of Women's Suffrage Societies
- Mary Fildes (1789–1876) – political activist and founder of Manchester Female Reform Society
- Edith Margaret Garrud (1872–1971) – trained "Bodyguard" unit of Women's Social and Political Union in jujutsu techniques
- Katharine Gatty (1870–1952) – journalist, lecturer, militant suffragette
- Cicely Hamilton (1872–1952) – English actress, writer, journalist, suffragist, feminist
- Diana Reader Harris (1912–1996) – educator and advocate of female ordination in the Church of England
- Matilda Hays (1820–1897) – co-founder of first journal to press for women's rights, the English Woman's Journal (1858–64)
- Margaret Hills (1892–1967) – organiser of the Election Fighting Fund
- Anna Mary Howitt (1824–1884) – feminist prominent in the campaign that led to the Married Women's Property Act 1870
- Leyla Hussein – Somali-born British psychotherapist and social activist, co-founder of the Daughters of Eve
- Anne Knight (1786–1862) – feminist and social reformer
- Priscilla Bright McLaren (1815–1906) – women's rights campaigner
- John Stuart Mill (1806–1873) – philosopher, political economist, author of The Subjection of Women
- Hannah Mitchell (1872–1956) – suffragette and socialist; autobiographer (The Hard Way Up)
- Elizabeth Montagu (1718–1800) – social reformer and Bluestocking
- Olive Morris (1952–1979) – feminist, black nationalist, squatters' rights activist
- Caroline Norton (1808–1877) – social campaigner influencing the Custody of Infants Act 1839, Matrimonial Causes Act 1857, and Married Women's Property Act 1870
- Grace Oakeshott (1872–1929) – women's rights activist who faked her own death
- Christabel Pankhurst (1880–1958) – suffragette, co-founder and leader of Women's Social and Political Union
- Emmeline Pankhurst (1858–1928) – founder leader of suffragette movement
- Bessie Rayner Parkes (1829–1925) – editor of first journal to press for women's rights, the English Woman's Journal (1858–64)
- Pleasance Pendred (1865–1948) – a secretary for the Women's Social and Political Union, writer and speaker for women's suffrage
- Dora Russell (1894–1986) – campaigner, advocate of marriage reform, birth control, and female emancipation
- Arabella Charlotte Scott (1886 – 1980) – Scottish suffragette and hunger striker
- Muriel Eleanor Scott (1888–1963) – Scottish suffragette, hunger striker, and protest organiser
- Sophia Alexandra Duleep Singh (1876–1948) – suffragette, involved in the Women's Tax Resistance League
- Charlotte Carmichael Stopes (1840–1929) – author and campaigner for women's rights, mother of Marie Stopes
- Marie Stopes (1880–1958) – advocate of birth control and equality in marriage
- Alice Vickery (1844–1929) – physician, supporter of birth control as means of women's emancipation
- Emma Watson (born 1990) – actress, feminist, women's rights activist
- Catherine Winkworth (1827–1878) – translator and women's rights activist, secretary of the Clifton Association for Higher Education for Women
- Mary Wollstonecraft (1759–1797) – writer and feminist
- Malala Yousafzai (born 1997) – see Pakistan
- Alice Zimmern (1855–1939) – writer and suffragist

== United States ==
- Jane Addams (1860–1935) – major social activist, president Women's International League for Peace and Freedom
- Susan B. Anthony (1820–1906) – prominent opponent of slavery, played a pivotal role in the 19th-century women's rights movement to introduce women's suffrage into the United States
- Yolanda Bako (born 1946) – New York activist, focused on addressing domestic violence
- Sharon Barker (1949–2023) – feminist activist, focused on improving educational access, creating economic opportunities, and fighting for reproductive freedom; founded Women's Resource Center at the University of Maine; a founder and first president of Mabel Sine Wadsworth Women's Health Center
- Helen Valeska Bary (1888–1973) – suffragist, researcher, social reformer
- Ione Biggs (1916–2005) – advocate for human rights and world peace
- Alice Stone Blackwell (1857–1950) – feminist and journalist, editor of the Woman's Journal, a major women's rights publication
- Antoinette Brown Blackwell (1825–1921) – founded American Woman Suffrage Association with Lucy Stone in 1869
- Henry Browne Blackwell (1825–1909) – businessman, abolitionist, journalist, suffrage leader and campaigner
- Harriot Stanton Blatch (1856–1940) – writer, suffragist, daughter of pioneering women's rights activist Elizabeth Cady Stanton
- Amelia Bloomer (1818–1894) – advocate of women's issues, suffragist, publisher and editor of The Lily
- Helen Gurley Brown (1922–2012) – author of Sex and the Single Girl, long-time editor of Cosmopolitan, advocate of women's self-fulfillment
- Lucy Burns (1879–1966) – suffragist and women's rights activist
- Christine Michel Carter (born 1986) – author, advocate of women's reproductive rights
- Carrie Chapman Catt (1859–1947) – suffragist leader, president of National American Woman Suffrage Association, founder of League of Women Voters and International Alliance of Women
- Jacqueline Ceballos (born 1925) – feminist and founder of Veteran Feminists of America
- Rebecca Chalker – women's health writer and activist who fought for abortion rights and promoted self-help techniques for women to avoid the gynecologist's office
- William Henry Channing (1810–1884) – minister, author
- Phyllis Chesler (1940-) – radical feminist writer, psychotherapist, activist and professor of psychology and women's studies, specialist of violence against women
- Grace Julian Clarke (1865–1938) – suffragist, journalist, author
- Hillary Rodham Clinton (born 1947) – lawyer, professor, author, First Lady, U.S. senator, U.S. secretary of state, first female presidential nominee in U.S. history
- Mabel Craft Deering (1873–1953) – journalist
- Nikki Craft (1949-) – artist, writer and feminist activist
- Angela Davis (1944-) – Marxist feminist political activist, philosopher, academic, author and social theorist
- Frederick Douglass (1818–1895) – abolitionist, writer, speaker
- Virginia Hewlett Douglass (1849–1889) – suffragist
- Carol Downer (born 1933) – founder of women's self-help movement, feminist, attorney
- Andrea Dworkin (1946–2005) – radical feminist writer, political theorist and activist
- Melissa Farley (1942-) – clinical psychologist, researcher, and radical feminist anti-pornography and anti-prostitution activist
- Muriel Fox (born 1928) – public relations executive and feminist activist
- Elisabeth Freeman (1876–1942) – suffragist, civil rights activist, participated in Suffrage Hikes
- Nancy Friday (1933–2017) – writer and activist
- Betty Friedan (1921–2006) – writer, activist, feminist
- Margaret Fuller (1810–1850) – Transcendentalist, advocate of women's education, author of Woman in the Nineteenth Century
- Matilda Joslyn Gage (1826–1898) – suffragist, editor, writer, organizer
- William Lloyd Garrison (1805–1879) – abolitionist, journalist, organizer, advocate
- Ruth Bader Ginsburg (1933–2020) – academic and lawyer for several women's rights cases before the United States Supreme Court; became a Supreme Court justice in 1993
- Emma Goldman (1869–1940) – campaigner for birth control and other rights
- Judy Goldsmith (born 1938) – feminist activist, president of National Organization for Women (NOW)
- Helen M. Gougar (1843–1907) – lawyer, temperance and women's rights advocate
- Louisa Morton Greene (1819-1900) - early champion of women’s suffrage and equal pay
- Grace Greenwood (1823–1904) – first woman reporter on New York Times, advocate of social reform and women's rights
- Thomas Wentworth Higginson (1828–1911) – abolitionist, minister, author
- Marjorie Hillis (1889–1971) – author writing in support of single working women
- Isabella Beecher Hooker (1822–1907) – leader, lecturer and activist in the American suffragist movement
- bell hooks (1952–1921) – feminist and antiracist philosopher, educator, author and social critic
- Julia Ward Howe (1818–1910) – suffragist, writer, organizer
- Jane Hunt (1812–1889) – philanthropist
- Josephine Irwin (1890–1984) – suffragist and educator
- Rosalie Gardiner Jones (1883–1978) – suffragist and organizer of the Suffrage Hikes
- Abby Kelley (1811–1887) – opponent of slavery, women's rights activist, one of the first women to voice views in public speeches
- Kate Kelly (born 1980) – feminist and human rights lawyer, founder of Ordain Women, works for Planned Parenthood
- Eva Kotchever (1891–1943) – friend of Emma Goldman, owner of the Eve's Hangout in New York, assassinated at Auschwitz
- Mabel Ping-Hua Lee (1896–1966) – suffragist, advocate for women's rights and for the Chinese immigrant community
- Mary Livermore (1820–1905) – suffragist and women's rights journalist
- Audre Lorde (1934–1992) – feminist poet, writer, philosopher, professor and civil rights activist
- Catharine A. MacKinnon (1946-) – feminist legal scholar, activist, and author
- Ah Quon McElrath (1915–2008) – labor and women's rights activist
- Inez Milholland (1886–1916) – suffragist, key participant in National Woman's Party and Woman Suffrage Parade of 1913
- Lee Minto (born 1927) – women's health and rights activist, sex education advocate, former executive director of Seattle-King County Planned Parenthood
- Janet Mock (born 1983) – writer, transgender rights activist, producer, journalist
- Robin Morgan (1941-2026) – poet, political theorist, journalist, lecturer
- Lucretia Mott (1793–1880) – abolitionist, women's rights activist, social reformer, who helped write Declaration of Sentiments during 1848 Seneca Falls Convention
- Pauli Murray (1910–1985) – civil and women's rights activist, lawyer, Episcopal priest
- Diane Nash (born 1938) – civil rights movement leader and organizer, voting rights exponent
- John Neal (1793–1876) – eccentric, writer and critic, America's first women's rights lecturer
- Zelda Kingoff Nordlinger (1932–2008) – instigator of first rape-reform laws
- Rose O'Neill (1874–1944) – famous illustrator (Kewpie creator) who worked for women's right to vote by creating posters and advertising material to promoting the women's movement
- Mary Hutcheson Page (1860–1940) – member of the Boston Equal Suffrage Association for Good Government, National American Woman Suffrage Association, and National Executive Committee of the Congressional Union for Women Suffrage, 1910 president of the National Woman Suffrage Association
- Maud Wood Park (1871–1955) – founder of College Equal Suffrage League, first president of League of Women Voters
- Adele Parker (1870–1956) – ardent suffragist, 1903 University of Washington law school graduate, 1911–1913 owned and operated the Western Woman Voter newspaper, 1934 House Representative 37th District in WA
- Deborah Parker (born 1970) – major player in the Violence Against Women Reauthorization Act of 2013 and activist for indigenous women's rights
- Alice Paul (1885–1977) – one of the leaders of the 1910s Women's Voting Rights Movement for the 19th Amendment, founder of National Woman's Party, initiator of Silent Sentinels and 1913 Women's Suffrage Parade, author of the proposed Equal Rights Amendment
- Frédérique Petrides (1903–1983) – see Belgium
- Wendell Phillips (1811–1884) – abolitionist, orator, lawyer
- Ann Hunter Popkin (born 1945) – social justice and women's movement activist
- Mónica Ramírez – author, civil rights attorney, speaker
- Margaret Sanger (1879–1966) – writer, nurse, eugenicist, founder of American Birth Control League, founder and first president of Planned Parenthood
- May Wright Sewall (1844–1920) – educator, feminist, president of National Council of Women for the United States, president of the International Council of Women
- Anna Howard Shaw (1847–1919) – president of National Women's Suffrage Association
- Pauline Agassiz Shaw (1841–1917) – founder president of Boston Equal Suffrage Association for Good Government
- Eleanor Smeal (born 1939) – organizer, initiator, president of NOW, founder and president of the Feminist Majority Foundation
- Elizabeth Cady Stanton (1815–1902) – social activist, abolitionist, suffragist, organizer of 1848 Women's Rights Convention, co-founder of National Woman Suffrage Association and International Council of Women
- Gloria Steinem (1934–2026) – writer, activist, feminist, women's rights journalist
- Doris Stevens (1892–1963) – organizer for National American Women Suffrage Association and National Woman's Party, Silent Sentinels participant, author of Jailed for Freedom
- Lucy Stone (1818–1893) – orator, one of the initiators of the first National Women's Rights Convention, founder of Woman's Journal, force behind the American Woman Suffrage Association, noted for retaining her surname after marriage
- Roshini Thinakaran – film-maker focusing on lives of women in post-conflict zones
- Dorothy Thompson (1893–1961) – Buffalo and New York suffragist, later journalist and radio broadcaster
- Sojourner Truth (c. 1797–1883) – abolitionist, women's rights activist and speaker
- Ella Lillian Wall Van Leer (1892–1986) – artist, architect, women's rights activist
- Maryly Van Leer Peck (1930–2011) – academic, first female engineer at Vanderbilt University, pioneer, women's rights activist and board member of Society of Women Engineers
- Mabel Vernon (1883–1975) – suffragist, member of Congressional Union for Women Suffrage, organizer for Silent Sentinels
- Dr. Mary Walker (1832–1919) – suffragist, doctor, activist, surgeon during the Civil War, recipient of the Medal of Honor
- Ida B. Wells (1862–1931) – civil rights and anti-lynching activist, journalist, educator, suffragist noted for refusal to avoid media attention as an African American
- Frances Willard (1839–1898) – long-time president of the Woman's Christian Temperance Union, which, under her leadership, supported women's suffrage
- Victoria Woodhull (1838–1927) – suffragist, eugenicist, publisher, organizer, first woman to run for U.S. presidency

=== Puerto Rico ===
- Luisa Capetillo (1879–1922) – labor union suffragette jailed for wearing pants in public

== Uruguay ==
- María Abella de Ramírez (1863–1926) – feminist noted for her role in establishing Uruguayan and Argentine women's groups in the early 1900s

== Vanuatu ==
- Motarilavoa Hilda Lin̄i – Turaga chief and women's rights activists
- Grace Mera Molisa (1946–2002) – politician, poet, gender equality advocate
- Jocelyn Naupa – politician, gender equality advocate, domestic violence activist
- Merilyn Tahi (born 1950) – domestic violence activist

== Venezuela ==
- Sheyene Gerardi – human rights advocate, peace activist, founder of the SPACE movement

== Yemen ==
- Muna Luqman – activist, peace builder, founder of the organization Food4Humanity and co-founder of Women in Solidarity Network

== Zambia ==
- Lily Monze (born 1936) – teacher, politician and women's rights activist
- Lucy Muyoyeta – women's rights activist, social development consultant and writer

== Zimbabwe ==
- Glanis Changachirere (born 1983) – women's rights activist and organizer, founder of the Institute for Young Women Development (IYWD)
- Talent Jumo (born 1980/1981) – teacher, co-founder and director of the Katswe Sistahood
- Nyaradzo Mashayamombe (born 1980) – women's and human rights advocate, founder of Tag A Life International Trust (TaLI)

== See also ==
- History of feminism
- List of civil rights leaders
- List of feminists
- List of suffragists and suffragettes
- List of women pacifists and peace activists
- List of women's rights organizations
- Timeline of first women's suffrage in majority-Muslim countries
- Timeline of women's rights (other than voting)
- Timeline of women's suffrage
- Women's suffrage organizations
