= Jeene Nahi Doonga =

- Promotional Poster
- Directed by: Rajkumar Kohli
- Written by: Rajkumar Kohli
- Produced by: Rajkumar Kohli
- Starring: Dharmendra; Shatrughan Sinha; Raj Babbar; Anita Raj; Roshni; Vinod Mehra
- Music by: Laxmikant–Pyarelal
- Release date: 26 October 1984
- Running time: 159 minutes
- Country: India
- Language: Hindi

Jeene Nahi Doonga is a 1984 Indian Hindi-language action drama film directed by Rajkumar Kohli. The film stars Dharmendra (in a double role), Shatrughan Sinha, Raj Babbar, Anita Raj, Roshni. Its plot bears resemblance to the 1979 Pakistani Punjabi -language film Maula Jatt.

Jeene Nahi Doonga was released worldwide on 26 October 1984, coinciding with the Diwali weekend. The film was the 12th highest grossing film of 1984.

== Cast ==
- Dharmendra as Roshan/Raka (Double Role)
- Shatrughan Sinha as Shaka
- Raj Babbar as Badal
- Anita Raj as Bijli
- Roshni as Reshma
- Vinod Mehra as Police Inspector
- Parikshit Sahni as Fakeer Baba
- Neeta Mehta as Chandni
- Shakti Kapoor as Shakti Singh
- Raza Murad as Jabbar
- Jagdeep as Jhumru
- Jayshree T.
- Jagdish Raj
- Leena Das
- Mehar Mittal
- Kader Khan as Narrator

== Plot ==
Bitter animosity and hatred has existed between the communities of Jangavar and Dilavar. While Dilavar's Roshan wants to bring peace between everyone, he sets an example by marrying Chandni. This enrages the Jangavars' who attack the Dilavars, killing Roshan. Before dying, Roshan asks his twin brother, Raka, to promise that he will bring peace by getting their brother, Badal, married to Shaka's sister, Reshma. Raka attempts to carry out his promise, by letting both meet and fall in love with each other. When the time comes for Badal to propose to Reshma, she accepts with one condition - that Badal kill Raka and bring his severed head to Jangavar. The question is will Badal sacrifice his brother's life to marry Reshma and bring peace between the two communities?

== Soundtrack ==
Song	Singer
"Tum Yaad Na Aaya Karo" (Happy)	Lata Mangeshkar, Shabbir Kumar
"Tum Yaad Na Aaya Karo" (Sad)	Lata Mangeshkar, Shabbir Kumar
"Hum Bhi Na Maane, Tum Bhi Na Maane"	Asha Bhosle, Shabbir Kumar
"Gali Gali Mein Baat Chali, Gali Gali Mein Baat Chali"	Asha Bhosle, Usha Mangeshkar
"Tera Guroor Tukde Tukde"	Asha Bhosle
"Yaad Rakhna Sajna"	Asha Bhosle
