= Agueh =

Agueh is a surname. Notable people with the surname include:

- Dossi Sekonou Gloria Agueh, a Beninese women's rights activist
- Eric Agueh (born 13 April 1972), a Beninese sprinter
- Maxime Agueh (born 1 April 1978), a Beninese footballer
