= Anna Westergaard =

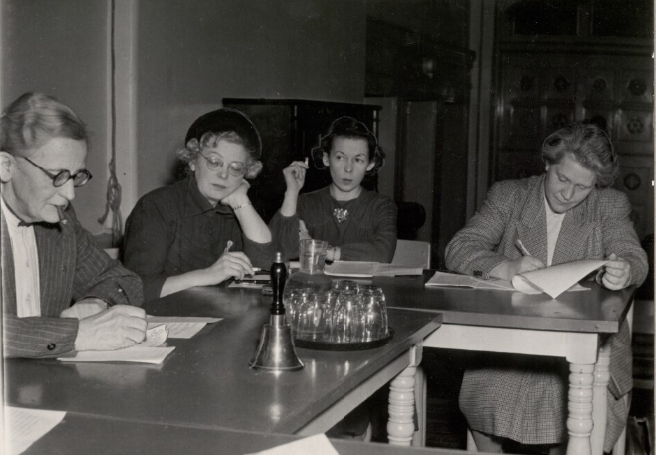
Anna Westergaard together with Nina Andersen, Clara Munck and Inge Merete Nordentoft (1951)

Anna Westergaard (1882–1964) was a Danish railway official and a highly influential women's rights activist. Working for the Danish State Railways where she later became a traffic supervisor, she became a board member of the Danish Railways Union (Jernbaneforeningen) and of the Danish Civil Servants Union (Statstjenestemændenes Centralorganisation). A strong proponent of equal rights for men and women in education and the labour market, she was a key contributor to management of the Danish Women's Society (1919–1924) and the Women's Council in Denmark (1938–1946). Westergaard represented Danish women's interests in discussions at the League of Nations in the mid-1930s. From 1937 to 1960, she was president of Open Door International for the Economic Emancipation of the Woman Worker. Politically, she belonged to the Danish Social Liberal Party and was an alternate in the Upper House or Landstinget from 1939 to 1953.

== Biography ==
Born on 8 June 1882 in Aarhus, Anna Westergaard was the daughter of the dentist Carl Rudolf Westergaard (1833–1901) and Cecilie Bøttcher Pape (1857–1945). After passing the preparatory examination in 1889, she embarked on a pioneering career with Danish Railways (DSB). She first worked as an assistant writer for DSB, Aarhus. In 1911, after receiving practical station-based training, she became the first woman to pass the traffic examination and was appointed traffic controller in 1925. In 1929, she became an administrative official in central management where in 1951 she was promoted to traffic supervisor. She took a keen interest in workers' rights, serving as a member of the central committee of the Railways Union (1912–1928) and of the Civil Servants Union (1912–1928). From 1922, she edited the Railways Union journal Vor Stand.

Her interest in feminism was inspired by her mother, the daughter of a pastor, who as a girl had refused to wear festive dresses. Westergaard played a leading role in support of women's rights, especially in connection with their gaining financial independence through education and employment outside the home. She took an early stand on equal pay for men and women, supporting Thora Pedersen in her efforts on the parliamentary wage committee. As a result, improved legislation was introduced in 1918. At the annual meeting of the Danish Women's Society in 1918, she was one of those who opposed the critical stand taken by the organization's leadership in connection with the newly elected women to the Danish parliament. As a result, Gyrithe Lemche had to resign, replaced by Julie Arenholt as the new chair. Westergaard became a member of the joint management committee (1919–1924) and was chair of the Gentofte-Charlottenlund branch of the Women's Society from 1929 to 1935.

From its establishment in 1934, Westergaard chaired the Danish Women's Business Council which provided support for women whose employment was threatened because of their gender. Women teachers in particular were accused of taking men's jobs in the 1930s. Westergaard also argued that the declining child numbers were more likely to be corrected by women taking paid employment without fear of dismissal for marriage and pregnancy.

Westergaard had always opposed any special measures in support of women's protection. In a key speech at the League of Nations in 1935, thought not officially representing the Danish delegation, she said women did not need protection. They would work under the same conditions as men, down in the mines or at night. In 1937, however, as Denmark's official representative she again voiced her opinion in Geneva. That year she was also elected president of Open Door International, founded in 1929 to support women in business. She continued to head the organization until 1960.

On the political front, she was a member of the Social Liberal Party. She served on the Gentofte Municipal Council (1924–1933) and in the 1930s was chair of the Gentofte Social Liberal Association. She stood for parliamentary election on several occasions but was never elected. She served as an alternate in Langstinget (Upper House) from 1939 to 1953. Westergaard contributed to various journals and newspapers as well as to significant works of the times on women, including Den gyldne Bog om danske Kvinder (1941) and Dansk Kvinde i Dag (1942).

Anna Westergaard died on 6 February 1964 in Charlottenlund. She was buried in Ordrup Cemetery.
