= Roshni =

Roshni or Roshini is a given name. Notable persons with that name include:

- Roshini (actress), Indian actress
- Roshini (singer), Indian singer
- Roshini Kempadoo (born 1959), British photographer, artist, and academic
- Roshini Thinakaran, Sri Lankan-American filmmaker
- Roshni Chopra (born 1980), Indian actress
- Roshni Dinaker, Indian costume designer and film director
- Roshni Kaur Soin (born 1986), Singaporean beauty pageant
- Roshni Nadar (born 1980/81), Indian business executive
- Roshni Rastogi, Indian actress
- Roshni Sahota, Indian actress and model
- Roshni Prakash (born 1993), Indian model and actress
- Roshni Walia (born 2001), Indian actress
- Roshini Haripriyan (born 1992), Indian television actress
