= Sayaka Osakabe =

Japanese women's rights activist

Sayaka Osakabe (小酒部 さやか)
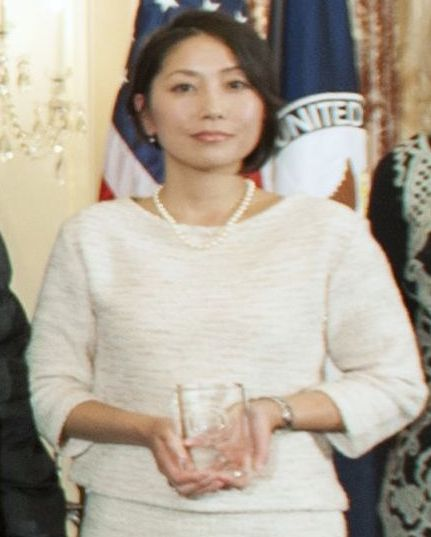
- Sayaka Osakabe receives the International Women of Courage Award in 2015
- Born: May 29, 1977 (age 49); Japan Kanagawa
- Occupations: Art director, women's activist, entrepreneur, businesswoman, and politician
- Years active: 2014 – present
- Known for: Women's activist Founder of specified nonprofit corporation: MATAHARA NET. Founder and president of: NATURAL RIGHTS Co. Ltd. Yokohama City Assembly Member representing Aoba Ward
- Political party: Liberal Democratic Party (自由民主党)
- Children: 2
- Awards: 2015 International Women of Courage Award
- Honours: Guest Speaker at APEC 2023 Women and the Economy Forum (in Seattle)
- Website: https://www.osakabe-sayaka.com

Sayaka Osakabe (小酒部 さやか, Osakabe Sayaka; born May 29, 1977) is a Japanese women's rights activist and politician. She is known for popularizing the term: "matahara" (referring to the act of harassing pregnant employees and forcing them to quit their position at work) and raising awareness in Japan that acts of matahara are illegal. She was a 2015 winner of the US State Department's International Women of Courage Award. In April 2023, Osakabe was elected to the City Assembly of Yokohama, representing the Aoba Ward.

== Biography ==
Sayaka Osakabe was born in Japan in 1977. Working as a magazine editor, she became pregnant. Rather than approve shorter working hours, her boss tried to pressure her to quit her job. After suffering two miscarriages, Osakabe asked for approved leave of absence should she become pregnant again and was denied. Osakabe quit her job under duress and pursued her case with a labor tribunal. In June, 2014, she won her case and formed a support group called Matahara Net, using a portmandeau of the English words "maternity and harassment" to create the name, which has now become a legal term.

In 2019 the World Economic Forum ranked Japan 121st in the world in workplace equality and official labor statistics showed one in four working women experienced maternity harassment. Though Japanese law guaranteed women the right to seek less physically demanding roles during pregnancy and allowed 14 weeks of maternity leave or parental leave, for either parent, in conjunction with childbirth, many women failed to utilize the guarantees due to perceived job insecurity. In 2023 the Word Economic Forum reported that Japan had fallen 9 positions in its gender gap ranking to 125th out of 146 nations, with the political participation of women ranked at 138th.

On 18 September 2014 Matahara members attended a trial at the Supreme Court in support of another woman undergoing a similar situation. The woman was demoted by her hospital employer during her pregnancy. A lower court ruling found that it was "in the scope of the hospital authority over personnel issues to remove her from her supervisory position," but Japan's Equal Employment Opportunity Law specifically bans demotion due to pregnancy. In a landmark ruling issued 23 October 2014, the Supreme Court of Japan overturned the lower court verdicts and ruled that demotion or other punitive measures based on pregnancy violate the Equal Employment Opportunity Law.

Thanks to Osakabe's actions and commitment, maternity harassment has been punishable by law in Japan since 2017.

While Osakabe acknowledged her award in 2015 had brought needed attention to the issue of maternity harassment in Japan, she knew that there was more work to be done. After establishing Natural Rights Co., Ltd., a company dedicated to providing workshops, educational materials, lectures, and articles regarding matahara and other social issues, she felt the limitations of activism and decided to enter the arena of local politics. During this time she and her husband were blessed with 2 children, and she campaigned for the Yokohama City Assembly with the support of the majority Liberal Democratic Party. In April 2023 Osakabe was elected to represent the Aoba Ward of the City of Yokohama – she was the first mother of a pre-school-age child (未就学児) to become an elected official.

Not content to wait patiently for seniority within her party to push for policy changes, Osakabe continues to push the boundaries within the Japanese political system for women, and parents. In April 2024, Osakabe carried out the Liberal Democratic Party's "First survey of recently elected men and women local legislators raising pre-school-age children," and presented its results directly to party leadership, specifically to Prime Minister Fumio Kishida, together with requested policy changes to improve the ability of local legislators to carry out their duties without sacrificing time spent raising children.
