= Talent Jumo =

- Born: 1980 or 1981 (age 44–45)
- Occupations: Teacher and charity founder/director
- Known for: Katswe Sistahood

Talent Jumo is a Zimbabwean teacher, and a co-founder and director of the Katswe Sistahood. She has promoted women's rights and health, including family planning.

== Career ==
Talent Jumo was originally a teacher, specialising in women and health. She became a Gender Officer in the HIV programme of the Community Working Group on Health in 2005, and in 2007 she co-founded the Young Women’s Leadership Initiative, which went on to become the Katswe Sistahood. In 2012, she became the Sistahood's director, which promotes women's rights and knowledge about sexual health.

The organisation has since won international awards, such as being one of the 20 winners of the With and For Girls award in 2015. Jumo ran the Nzwika! Girl Be Heard festival during the same year, which saw a petition drawn up on the rights of teenage girls handed to the Zimbabwean government. Jumo and the Sistahood raised the profile of the sexual exploitation of vulnerable underage girls in Harare. She was also awarded a grant by the Bill & Melinda Gates Foundation for her work in promoting family planning, and was named to the BBC's 100 Women programme. She is part of #teamgo, which seeks to tackle the street harassment of women globally.
