= Maria Bezobrazova =

Russian philosopher, educator, journalist and activist (1857–1914)

Maria Vladimirovna Bezobrazova
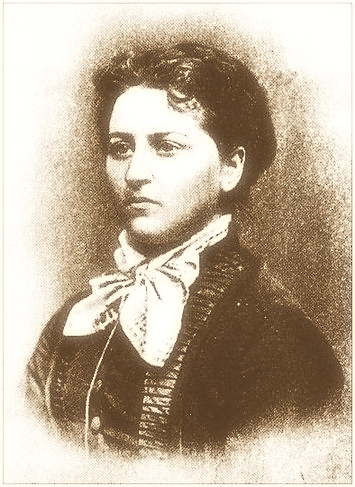
- Born: 1857; Saint Petersburg
- Died: 1914 (aged 56–57); Moscow
- Occupations: Philosopher and women's rights activist

Maria Vladimirovna Bezobrazova (1857-1914) was a philosopher, historiographer, educator, journalist and women's rights activist from the Russian Empire. She was "the first among Russian women to receive training in philosophy".

== Life ==
Maria Bezobrazova was born in Saint Petersburg: her father was an economist, and her mother was a writer. She was a founding member of the Russian Women's Mutual Philanthropic Society, taking lecture courses for women from academics including the chemist Dimitri Mendeleev and the botanist Andrei Beketov. She then studied philosophy at the University of Leipzig and the University of Zurich, gaining her doctorate from the University of Berne in 1891. Influenced by Tolstoy, she advocated an 'ethical idealism'.

Bezobrazova wrote for feminist publications, and was active in the Russian women's rights movement throughout her life. She rejected traditional ideas of gender identity and marriage:

I wasn't born like others ... I always felt myself to be a boy, a man... I never had the desire to be the type of woman who we all know – one who is totally enslaved. My nature is foreign to such enslavement.

Bezobrazova died in Moscow in 1914.

== Works ==
- Über Plotin’s Glückseligkeitslehre [Plotinus' teaching on happiness]. Leipzig, 1887.
- Handschriftliche Materialien zur Geschichte der Philosophie in Russland [Handwritten materials for the history of philosophy in Russia], Bern, 1891.
- Философские этюды [Philosophical studies]. Moscow, 1894.
- Краткий обзор существенных моментов истории философии [A Brief Overview of the Essentials of the History of Philosophy]. Moscow, 1894.
- Розовое и чёрное из моей жизни [The red and the black of my life]. Saint-Petersburg, 1910.
- Исследования, лекции, мелочи [Studies, lectures, fragments]. Saint-Petersburg, 1914.
