= Yogita Bhayana =

Indian social activist

- Born: Delhi, India
- Occupation: Activist
- Organization: People Against Rape in India (PARI)

Yogita Bhayana is a well-known anti-rape activist in India, who heads People Against Rape in India (PARI), an organization that seeks to support rape survivors and help them get justice. She has also founded and ran 200 homeless shelters in Delhi and landed support to rape survivors beginning anti-sexual violence efforts. She began a campaign "Nari Ke 2 Din" which seeks to create a special session of parliament on women’s issues.

== Education ==
Bhayana got her Master's degree in Disaster Management.

== Early life ==
She has been a leading member of interviewing Anganwadi workers across Delhi NCR, expert committee on gender and education National Commission for Women, Rogi Kalyan Samiti Government of Delhi, and the Sexual Harassment Board of Delhi.

Witnessing a road accident and watching the apathy of the police and hospital staff first-hand led Bhayana to become a social activist. Bhayana has been closely working on Rape cases. Her protests were instrumental on the 2012 Delhi gang rape and murder case.

== Career as an activist ==
Due to the COVID-19 pandemic in India, many people from places far from Delhi were sent home with no treatment from the All India Institute of Medical Sciences, New Delhi. Bhayana stated, "Most of these patients have nowhere to stay or live... We found a group in which heart patients, cancer patients, and others with burn injuries were there. Many of them were not even able to walk. They are poor and also suffer from disabilities or problems." She organized for buses to take them home, and paid for the transportation out of pocket.

== Controversies ==
=== Delhi Police Notice ===
On 3 February 2021, Delhi Police sent a notice to Bhayana under IPC section 153, 153A. 505(1)(b) to appear before Police. Responding to which, Bhayana accused the Delhi Police of suppressing her voice, and said her only crime was that she had been supporting the farmers protesting against three Central agricultural laws.

=== Protest at Bihar CM office ===
On 2 April 2022, Bhayana along with a rape victim's father and uncle protested outside Nitish Kumar's, Bihar Chief Minister's office. A police officer (SI Rank) misbehaved with Bhayana stating "Now Bihar Police will tell, how ladies should live".
