= Entisar Elsaeed =

Egyptian women's rights lawyer and human rights activist

- Other name: Entessar El-Saeed
- Occupations: A Lawyers/ Women's rights activist/ Chairperson of Cairo Foundation for Development and Law
- Organization(s): Cairo Foundation for Development and Law

Entisar Elsaeed (also spelled Entessar El-Saeed, Intisar al-Saeed) is an Egyptian women's rights activist and the founder and director of the Cairo Foundation for Development and Law. Her foundation and mission primarily focus on curbing female genital mutilation, helping victims of domestic abuse, and providing sexual education.

== Activism ==
=== COVID-19 pandemic ===
With the coming of the COVID-19 pandemic, Elsaeed and her foundation focused on increasing domestic abuse inflicted on many women. With lockdown orders keeping men away from work and in homes for more hours of the day, the rate of domestic abuse was predicted to rise. Additionally, sexual education suffered during the pandemic, resulting in growing inability to access safe sexual information. Finally, the responsibility for keeping family members safe and socially distanced was observed to most frequently fall on the mother of the household, along with general responsibility for the health and care of the family. As a result, Elsaeed's foundation increased its output of educational material on all three of these issues, which allowed them to continue to make an impact while still adhering to safe COVID protocols. https://www.ohchr.org/EN/NewsEvents/Pages/EgyptianWomenCOVID-19.aspx

=== Female genital mutilation ===
Elsaeed has spoken out against female genital mutilation (FGM) in Egypt, which has the largest number of women who have undergone FGM of any country. She approved of steps by the Egyptian government to impose harsher sentences for those convicted of perpetrating FGM, but spoke out about the cultural entrenchment of FGM in Egyptian society. Elsaeed cited concerns that laws would not be enforced and convictions would be few and far between.

=== Free speech ===
In addition, Elsaeed supported the free speech of two young Egyptian women who were imprisoned for "inciting debauchery" by posting videos on TikTok, a popular social media and video-sharing application. The two women faced human trafficking charges. Elsaeed has criticized the inability of many in Egypt to adjust to new cultural changes which have developed as a result of social media.

Elsaeed also commented on safe spaces, remarking on local project Girl Zone in rural Banha, near Cairo, that while she supported the project's goal of encouraging girls to engage in community work, culture, and sports, the safe space also promoted segregation, isolation, and discrimination. She noted that creation of such a safe space would be better done in more rural areas such as Upper Egypt, where women face stricter restrictions and alienation.

Women's Rights

As grassroots feminist movements in Egypt began to take place, Elsaeed asserted that new legislation regarding personal status proposed by the Egyptian government should promote gender equality. She further asserted that custody cases should be decided in compliance with international law, educational guardianship should be shared, and women should have personal autonomy and freedoms without requiring permission from their husbands. She described this treatment of women in the 21st century as "inconceivable".
