= Iris Stern Levi =

Israeli feminist activist

- איריס שטרן לוי
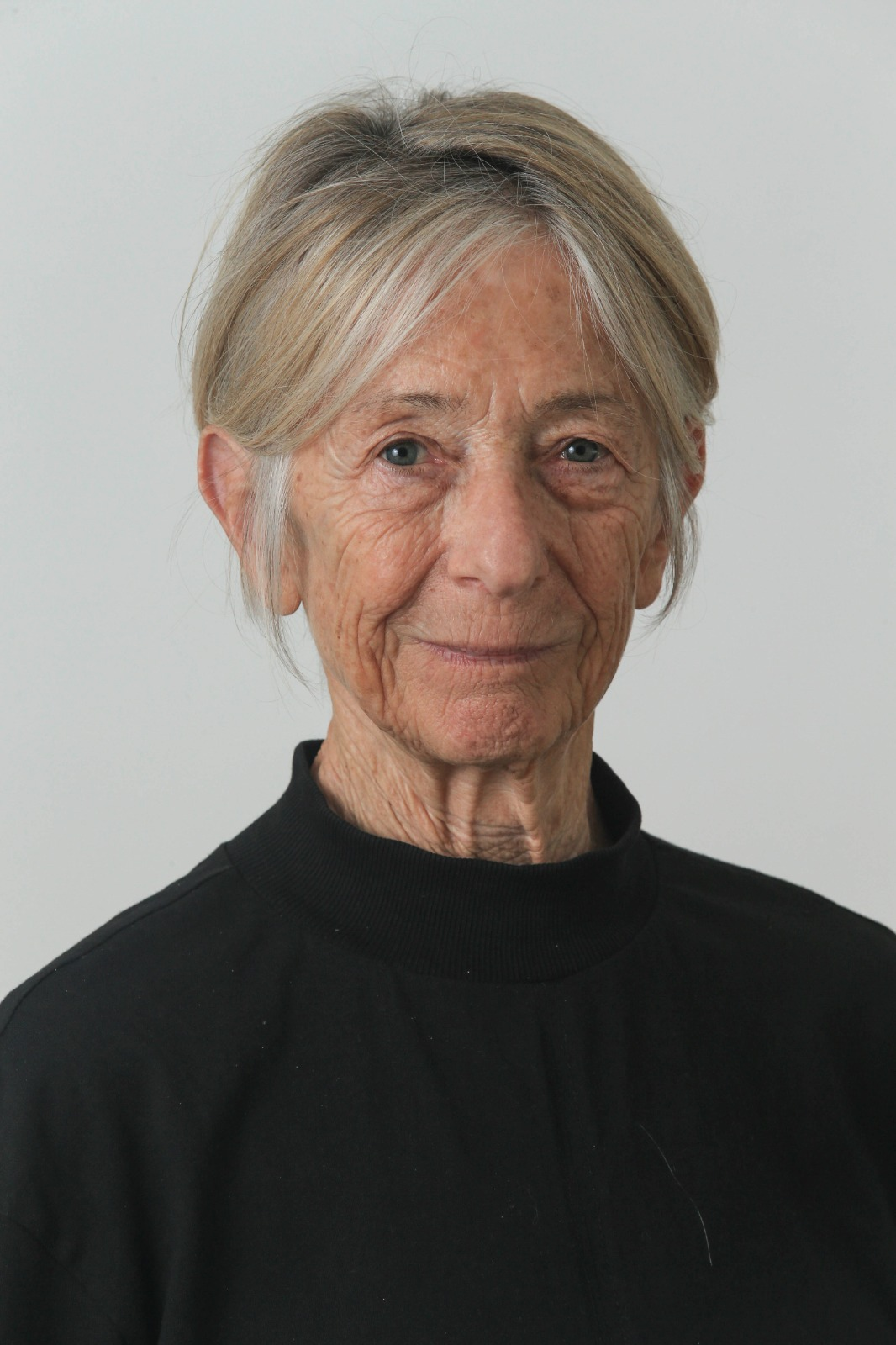
- Born: 11 May 1953 (age 73); Jaffa, Israel
- Occupations: Social activist, artist
- Known for: Co-founding Her Academy and Turning the Tables
- Awards: Sussman-Joint Award (2018); Rappaport Prize for Women Generating Change in Israeli Society (2021); Rayah Fund Honoree (2021); JDC Kaveret Prize for Social Entrepreneurship (2019); Yaffa London Yaari Foundation Award (2017); Israel's Speaker of the Knesset Quality of Life Award (2017)

Iris Stern Levi (Hebrew: איריס שטרן לוי; born May 11, 1953) is an Israeli social activist focused on issues of women's and human rights. She is co-founder of the non-profit organizations Her Academy (2016) and Turning the Tables (2011), both of which work to provide vocational training for women who are survivors of prostitution and violence. Stern Levi is also on the board of Coalition of Women for Peace, co-director of the Testimony Tribunal of Women Victims of Sexual Assault and was the volunteer coordinator for the Tel Aviv Sexual Assault Crisis Center for 16 years. She is the recipient of the 2018 Sussman-Joint Award.

== Background ==
Stern Levi was born on May 11, 1953, in Jaffa, and moved to Australia with her family at an early age. In 1970, at the age of 18, she was sent by her parents to live with relatives in Tel Aviv. Stern Levi studied art and is a graduate of the group guidance program at Tel Aviv University.

In the 1990s, Stern Levi lived in Amsterdam for three years. During this time, lacking a studio to work in, she sought something meaningful to occupy her time, and became aware of the plight of Bosnian women during and in the aftermath of the Bosnian War, many of whom suffered harm, ranging from rape as a weapon of war, rape by the men returning from the front, and human trafficking. This was Stern Levi's entrance into activism for women from oppressed groups or victims of violence, and upon her return to Israel was determined to continue along this path, and began volunteering at the Tel Aviv Sexual Assault Crisis Center.

== Activism for Women ==
=== Tel Aviv Sexual Assault Crisis Center ===
In 1997, Stern Levi began volunteering at the Tel Aviv Sexual Assault Crisis Center. Within a year, she was recruited into a professional position, and for a period of 16 years, Stern Levi was the volunteer network coordinator, managing a group of some 200 volunteers, and responsible for intake, training and schedules. Stern Levi is one of the founders of the Testimony Tribunal of Women Victims of Sexual Assault project. The idea behind the tribunal is based on other people's tribunals in the world that were established by women when they realized that the mechanisms of law and government do not serve the needs and goals of women on issues of sexual violence, such as the 1976 International Tribunal on Crimes against Women. The tribunals are not official bodies and have no enforcement power; they are designed to raise awareness of issues that are neglected by official systems and media, as well as to strengthen solidarity between women victims of violence and other crimes.

=== Turning the Tables ===
In 2011, Stern Levi left the Crisis Center and turned to other areas of activism for women. Together with Lilach Tzur, who was a volunteer at the Crisis Center, she established an organization called Turning the Tables, a vocational training project, a business incubator and a social business for trafficked women and those exiting the cycles of addiction and prostitution. The organization's studios provide centers of study for sewing, fashion, branding, digital marketing and business development, and accompaniment to women seeking access to legal rights, rehabilitation and assistance in various aspects of life.

In 2013, a permanent studio was opened in Tel Aviv, and two years later, the Haifa branch was launched.

=== Her Academy ===
Her Academy was founded by Stern Levi and Tal Hamoui in 2016 in Tel Aviv. The organization offers vocational training for women seeking to return to the workforce after years in prostitution and dealing with its corollary issues of addiction, poverty, marginalization, ill health, depression and so on. The school aims to provide all that is needed to enable the women to integrate into workplaces and earn a living, which includes more than just practical training, but also empowerment and support. The courses are conducted by business owners and professionals on a voluntary basis, in a framework that enables them to contribute directly to the empowerment of socially and economically disadvantaged women. One of the principles of the activity is the "eye-level encounter", recognizing the special needs of the women participating as a result of the damages of prostitution, including problems of concentration, difficulty in persistence and low self-esteem, but addressing their needs as peers, and not from a position of superiority. The college's approach has been recognized as unique in the world, because it also sees the teachers as students of the phenomena of prostitution, and the students as a source of inspiration and knowledge, and all those involved as ambassadors of change and consciousness-raising in society, and of the struggle to break down stigmas and harmful stereotypes. In February 2024, Her Academy duplicated its revolutionary model and opened a second branch in Haifa.

=== Additional activities ===
In 2014, Stern Levi initiated an action aimed at the Tel Aviv municipality, after it claimed that the distribution of prostitution calling cards in the streets of Tel Aviv was a police problem, whereas the police refused to enforce laws against their distribution. Together with activist Reut Guy, she led a project to collect prostitution cards from the city's streets, which were then piled up at a protest rally in front of the municipality building, in order to demand that the mayor take care of the matter.

Another initiative Stern Levi launched was creation of the Women's Professional Service Network, a directory of women professionals, focused particularly on the fields of home services and maintenance, such as electricians, plumbers, gardeners, carpenters, home repair and handywomen, locksmiths, painters, and other areas in which women are a tiny minority, such as taxi drivers and movers. A major impetus for the project was a case in which a woman was raped by a serviceman who entered her home, and thus Stern Levi was inspired by the dual goals of empowering women in gender non-traditional jobs and enabling women to maximize their physical security.

In 2008, Stern Levi was chosen by the Bat Shalom organization as a speaking representative at the International Conference in honor of International Women's Day in Madrid, in the section Women Against Occupation, in which representatives from Colombia, Cuba and the French feminist organization Ni Putes Ni Soumises participated. In 2009 she developed a curriculum for providing counseling and support to activists against Israel's military occupation of Palestine. In 2009, Stern Levi was one of the featured subjects in Guy Davidi's documentary Women Defying Barriers, about the attempts of four Israeli Jewish and Palestinian women to meet, under the shadow of Israel's attack on Gaza in 2008.

Stern Levi guides women's empowerment groups, and since 2016, also leads gender consciousness groups for homosexual men. She is a frequent lecturer on feminist subjects, in particular the representations of women in media and advertising. She is active in protests on various issues, from femicide, to racism against Ethiopian Jews, to solidarity with Gaza.

== Art ==
Stern Levi worked as a painter in her own studio and as an art teacher for many years. In addition to her work as an artist, she founded an art studio for refugees and residents of the distressed Shapira neighborhood in Tel Aviv between 2008-2011. Between April and July 2007, Stern Levi exhibited a solo exhibition of her work at the Beit Achoti Gallery. A self-portrait of hers is included in the award-winning manuscript by Tal Dekel, on discrimination against old women in art.

== Awards and recognition ==
Iris Stern Levi is the recipient of numerous awards and prizes for her work, including:

2025: The International Alliance for Women World of Difference Awardee

2021 - Stern Levi Laureate for Lifetime Achievement - Rappaport Prize for Women Generating Change in Israeli Society

2021 - Stern Levi - Rayah Fund Honoree

2019 - Her Acacdemy - JDC Kaveret prize for Social Entrepreneurship

2018 - Stern Levi received the Zusman-JDC Award for Excellence in Social Action preventing abuse of oppressed and marginalized communities

2020 - Stern Levi was selected as the Fanny Reading Human Rights Lecturer, Australia

2017 - Stern Levi and Tal Hamoui awarded the Yaffa London Yaari Foundation Award for the establishment and management of Her Academy

2017 - Winner of Israel's Speaker of the Knesset Quality of Life Award - Her Academy

== Personal life ==
Stern Levi is the eldest of three daughters of George Stern, born in Austria, who was sent to Glasgow, Scotland, as part of the Kindertransport during World War II, and who grew up in Scotland and England; and Dvora Nachmias, who was born in Israel, and was one of 13 children in her family. Dvora's brother is the writer and Ladino typographer, Ben Zion Nachmias.

Stern Levi has two adult children with cultural historian Dror K. Levi, and is a grandmother of one. Since 2004, Stern Levi lives with her same-sex partner.

== See also ==
- Coalition of Women for Peace
- Prostitution
- Rape crisis centre
- Sex trafficking
