= Christine Loudes =

Belgian human rights activists

Christine Marie-Helene Loudes
- Died: 28 December 2016
- Education: University of Nottingham, Queen's University, Belfast
- Organization: Amnesty International
- Known for: Human rights campaigning

Christine Marie-Helene Loudes (1972–2016) was a human rights lawyer who worked to achieve social change for justice and equality. She was a noted human rights activist who dedicated much of her academic and professional life to campaigning for gender equality and advocating for women's rights. She was honoured for her work to end female genital mutilation (FGM) and headed Amnesty International's End FGM campaign that led to the establishment of the End FGM European Network. During her career, Dr Loudes worked with ILGA-Europe (International Lesbian, Gay, Trans and Intersex Association), the European Institute for Gender Equality and the Northern Ireland Human Rights Commission.

== Education ==
She obtained her PhD in women's rights and politics from Queen's University, Belfast (2003), after receiving an LLM degree in human rights law from the University of Nottingham and a master's degree in political science and law from the Université Robert Schuman.

== Career ==
Loudes began her career teaching European Law and French Civil Law at Queen's University, Belfast and later joined the Northern Ireland Human Rights Commission as Investigation Officer.

Between 2004 and 2008 she was Policy Director of the European Region of International Lesbian, Gay, Trans and Intersex Association (ILGA-Europe) campaigning for the rights of LGBTI people in the Council of Europe, the Organization for Security and Cooperation in Europe, the European Union, and the United Nations.

In January 2009, she joined Amnesty International's European Institutions Office in Brussels as End FGM European Campaign director. She campaigned to end female genital mutilation in partnership with 15 national organisations and acted as an adviser in a mapping study on FGM for the European Institute for Gender Equality. She was awarded Amnesty International's Gender Defender Award in December 2014.

She joined the European Institute for Gender Equality in 2015 as Senior Officer on Gender Based Violence, a post she held until her death on 28 December 2016.
