= Mamatha Raghuveer Achanta =

Indian activist

Dr. Mamatha Raghuveer Achanta
- Born: Mamatha Achanta; 19 December 1967 (age 58); Nalgonda, Telangana, India
- Occupation: Activist
- Known for: Activism for children's rights and work against child marriages
- Website: mamatharaghuveer.in

Mamatha Raghuveer Achanta (born 19 December 1967) is a women's and children's rights activist. She has served as chairperson of the Child Welfare Committee, Warangal District, as a member of the A.P. State Commission for the Protection of Child Rights, and as the founder and executive director of Tharuni, a non-government organization (NGO) that focuses on the empowerment of girls and women. She has participated in rescues and adjudicated issues such as exploitation, violence, child sexual abuse, child marriages, and child neglect.

== Work against child marriages ==
Dr. Mamatha Raghuveer Achanta formed Balika Sanghas (Girls’ Collectives/Girl Child Clubs), to empower girls aged between 14 and 18 years using multiple approaches such as savings schemes, awareness-building programmes, and vocational training, to raise the self-worth of their members, and specifically to stop child marriages in Warangal good District.

== NILA (Network of International Legal Activists) ==
Dr. Mamatha founded Network of International Legal Activists (NILA) in 2015 which works for the protection of the rights of women and children globally. NILA's Mission is to help women and children get access to speedy justice through legal aid and counseling. It helps them become aware of the law and protects their rights by offering victim assistance services. This network aspires to bring together legal activists to ensure that the human rights of vulnerable groups that are subjected to marginalization, such as women and children, are addressed in the context of crime prevention and criminal justice reform. The network is international in scope to make justice accessible to all, which is especially necessary due to the migration of women and children from one part of the world to another. NILA aims to increase the access to judicial and other legal mechanisms, extend assistance to victims by ensuring legal counseling and aid, offer physical and psychological support and therapy, and create an environment for their rehabilitation.

NILA has taken up 45 cases from five countries and helped the women through legal aid and counseling. NILA filed two Public Interest Litigation (PIL) cases with Lokayukta of Telangana and Andhra Pradesh related to child deaths in academic institutions due to the negligence of management and unnecessary surgeries performed on women and children adversely affecting their health.

NILA along with Save the Children organized a conference to review the Child Labour (Prohibition and Regulation) Bill. It was held on Sep. 15, 2015 at ASCI, Banjarahills Campus, Hyd from 11 AM to 2 PM. The Union Minister of Labour and Employment, Sri Bandaru Dattatreya, was the Chief Guest and the Minister for Home and Labour, Employment and Training, Telanagna Sri Nayani Narsimha Reddy, was the Guest of Honour.

== BHAROSA - Support Center For Women & Children (An Initiative of Telangana Police) ==
Dr. Mamatha is the Technical Partner to BHAROSA - Support Center For Women & Children, a Telangana Police initiative. She has conceptualized this initiative along with Ms. Swati Lakra IPS to support the victims of violence, both women and children. For the past 8 years, Dr. Mamatha has been with Bharosa. The initiative hosts a child-friendly counseling facility to record the statements of victims of abuse.
