= Sneha Jawale =

Indian social worker and activist

- Born: 1977 (age 48–49)
- Occupations: Social worker, activist for the visibility of violence against women, astrologer, theatre actress and television presenter
- Employer: BBC India
- Website: snehajawale.com

Sneha Jawale (born 1977) is an Indian social worker and activist for the visibility of violence against women. She is also an astrologer, actress and television presenter for BBC India.

== Biography ==
Jawale is based in Mumbai, Maharashtra, India. She was married when she was 20 years old.

In December 2000, Jawale's parents were unable to fulfil her husband's demand for more dowry payments. Her husband then set her on fire with kerosene in the presence of their four-year-old son. Jawale suffered 80 per cent burns and spent two-and-a-half months in hospital. After the attack, her husband asked her family not to file a police complaint. Her husband later filed for divorce in a court in Osmanabad, which was granted, and took her son away.

After her divorce, Jawale sold her jewellery, rented a house and achieved an education degree. She was unable to find paid work, so became an astrologer and tarot reader to earn money. Jawale also became an activist, and participated in the 2013 One Billion Rising campaign.

In 2014, Jawale starred in Yael Faber's theatre play, Nirbhaya, performing in 300 shows worldwide. The play is named after one of the pseudonyms of the 2012 Delhi gang-rape and murder victim, Jyoti Singh, and is based on the experiences of survivors of domestic violence in India. Jawale shared her personal testimony during the performances.

Jawale has also worked a guest anchor at BBC India, presenting explainer videos.

She was named a BBC 100 Woman in 2022.
