= Zeinebou Mint Taleb Moussa =

Mauritanian women's rights activist

- زينب منت طالب موسى
- Occupation(s): Midwife, Human rights activist

Zeinebou Mint Taleb Moussa (Arabic: زينب منت طالب موسى) is a women's rights activist in Mauritania, focused on combating sexual violence through her work as founder of El Wafa, a survivors' center, and as president of the non-governmental organization the Mauritanian Association for Maternal and Child Health (French: Association Mauritanienne pour la Santé de la Mère et de l'Enfant, AMSME).

== Career ==
Mint Taleb Moussa was trained as a midwife, and worked in the Mauritanian Ministry of Health. In 2000, together with other midwives, she established the AMSME, to educate women about reproductive health and rights. In beginning their work, however, they realized that another issue, sexual violence, needed addressing. So in 2001, she founded the El Wafa center in Nouakchott to help victims of rape and sexual assault.

In 2016 she was named by the president of Mauritania, a member of the National Process for the Prevention of Torture (French: Mécanisme National de Prévention de la Torture). She has also served as an advisor for the Global Fund for Women.

Mint Taleb Moussa is working with other leaders in Mauritania to draft new laws concerning rape, which is not specifically recognized in the legal code.

== Awards and honors ==
- OkayAfrica 100 Women, 2017.
- Femme de Courage en Mauritanie pour l’année 2017, presented by United States Ambassador to Mauritania, 2017.
