= Ihsan El-Kousy =

First Arab Muslim woman to graduate from AUB

- Born: 1900; Al Qusea, Egypt
- Spouse: Ahmad Shakir

Ihsan El-Kousy (born in 1900) was the first Egyptian Muslim woman to graduate from the American University of Beirut.

== Early life ==
Ihsan El-Kousy was born in 1900 in Al Qusea, an ancient city in central Egypt near the Nile. During that time education for girls wasn't common or encouraged, however, Ihsan received an education and continued her studies until she earned a graduate degree and then a PhD in UK. This was due to the fact that both her parents and grandparents kept on motivating her, in addition to generally being raised up surrounded by books. In fact, Ihsan then moved to Lebanon and became the first Muslim woman to get into AUB in 1924, additionally to being the first women to get a graduate degree in 1929. However, she needed her husband's approval to continue her plan. Furthermore, Ihsan returned to Egypt and became actively involved in the Women's Movement which led to her becoming secretary of Women's Union Society.

== Expanded description ==
Upon her arrival to the American University of Beirut, El-Kousy discovered that her English level was not advanced enough to follow through the courses and that is when she decided to begin her education as an auditor. By the end of her second year, El-Kousy was encouraged by AUB's president Dodge, at the time, to apply to become a regular enrolled student. After succeeding in all her exams in “Education”, which is the major she enrolled in, she graduated with a bachelor's degree in 1929.

After completing her degree, Ihsan made her way back to Egypt and was immediately appointed as the principal of the Sanieh Secondary School where she stayed for one year. For the following three years, El-Kousy was headmistress in a primary school in Alexandria, following which she was called to lecture on social subjects, history, civics, and ethics in various secondary schools for eight more years.

In 1953, Ihsan became the Dean of Girls’ Higher Institute for Social Work, an institution of university standards. Her interest in social work prompted her to pursue activities in various fields of Egyptian life. Also, she helped found and serve on the boards of the Egyptian Feminist Union, Maadi Child Welfare, and Home of Delinquent Children. Ihsan El-Kousy served as the vice president of the AUB Alumni Association in Cairo at the time. Her various achievements and activities effect in numerous spheres of Egyptian day-to-day life.

== Marriage and children ==
Ihsan El-Kousy was married to Ahmad Shakir who accompanied her from Cairo to Beirut in pursuit of education. It is not known whether the couple had any children.

== Successes ==
Ihsan El-Kousy opened the door for many other girls to follow their goals and walk through a proper career path without being dependent on men. Even after her own personal education she continued to work and support other girls and women by getting involved with WUS and initiating Women's Students’ Organization (WSO). In other worlds, she wanted to share her educational experience and its power with all women and because of her collaborations many girls today are being educated and fighting for their rights and are now active in male dominant fields.

== Philosophical and/or political views ==
Ihsan El-Kousy took part in the 1919 revolution against the British occupation, alongside her sister Amina El-Kousy.

In addition to her political role, Ihsan was socially active where she was a secretary in the Women's Union Association established by Hadi Shaarawi. She also fought for women development and acknowledgement of their role in the community.

== Published works ==
After realizing that there were no Arabic books on the philosophy of education in Egypt, Ihsan was inspired to summarize and translate John Dewey's book “Democracy and Education” into Arabic. Her book was later published in January 1928.

Moreover, Ihsan wrote several books and articles including “الرسالة”, “تطور الأسرة المصرية”, and “مؤتمر التربية الدولي السابع” which were published in May 1936, August 1941, and November 1936 respectively.

Ihsan El-Kousy translated one of Bruce Bliven's books to Arabic and named it “"بناة المستقبل, so that Arabs would have the opportunity to read the latest news about what is happening in the West concerning the secrets of the universe and nature. Her copy was later published in one of Egypt’s libraries called “مكتبة النهضة المصرية ” yet, the date of publication is unknown.

== Recognition ==
Ihsan Ahmed El-Kousy, as mentioned before, is an Egyptian Muslim women, who is recognized as the first Muslim women graduate of the American University of Beirut after receiving her bachelor's degree in 1929. After that, she continued her graduate studies in London and began giving lectures on how women should obtain their full rights. One of her lectures was at the American University in Cairo, where the main aim was to improve women's status; this lecture was the main reason why various institutions asked Ihsan to present lectures on women rights. Moreover, Ihsan Ahmed El-Kousy published books which she illustrated that were sold in many libraries.
