= Annie Basil =

Iranian-Indian activist

- آنا بارسقیان
- Born: Anna Barseghyan; October 13, 1911; Shiraz, Qajar Iran
- Died: November 5, 1995 (aged 84); Calcutta, India
- Occupation(s): Public figure, actress

Annie Basil (née Anna Barseghyan; 13 October 1911 in Shiraz - 6 November 1995 in Calcutta) was an Iranian-born Indian activist and stage actress. Originally a theatre actress, she was a member of the Indian Academy of Fine Arts. She served as chairwoman of the Armenian Women's Benevolent Union from 1965 to 1967, then served as chairwoman of the National Women's Council of India from 1969 to 1973.
