= Louise Glerup Aner =

Louise Glerup Aner (born 1 November 1972) is a Danish geographer. Since 2021, she has headed the knowledge and communication department of Lev Uden Cold (English: Life Without Violence), a Danish organization designed to fight domestic violence and rape. Aner was appointed following the resignation of Sine Gregersen.

== Biography ==
Born in Aalborg on 1 November 1972, Louise Glerup Aner earned a doctorate in geography from the University of Copenhagen in 2009. She went on to become a consultant in her own firm, Naboskaber. Thereafter she served as a lector in the Social Work Centre at Metropolitan University College before becoming a consultant at the Danish Centre for Housing and Social Development (DFBU). More recently, she served as a consultant for Ramboll in connection with a number of large knowledge projects in the social sphere. In April 2021, she was appointed head of the knowledge and consultation department at Lev Uden Vold.

In 2022, Glerup Aner presented a report showing that almost every tenth women in Denmark has experienced partner violence.
