= Lucia Nader =

Brazilian human rights activist

Lucia Nader is a Brazilian social entrepreneur and human rights activist. She is currently a fellow with the Open Society Foundations, investigating how professional civil society organizations are dealing with trends of contemporary societies - a project called Solid Organizations in a Liquid World. She was, until December 2014, Executive Director of Conectas Human Rights.

She holds a postgraduate degree in Development and International Organizations from the Paris Institute of Political Studies (Sciences-Po) and a bachelor's degree in international relations from the Catholic University of São Paulo (PUC-SP).

== Career ==
Nader started her career as a volunteer at Instituto Sou da Paz where she became institutional relations and communications coordinator (1999). She joined Conectas Human Rights in 2003, having served as network coordinator (2003–2005) and international relations coordinator (2006–2011) and Executive Director (2011–2014). She created the organizations' Foreign Policy and Human Rights Project and was also executive secretary of the Brazilian Foreign Policy and Human Rights Committee.

She was named a social entrepreneur by Ashoka (2009) and is currently board or assembly member of LARCI – Latin American Regional Climate Initiative (since 2015), GACINT – Group of Analysis of International Conjuncture of the University of Sao Paulo (since 2014), Fund for Global Human Rights (United States, since 2014), CPJA – Think tank on Rule of Law and Civil Society (Brazil, since 2013), Ação Educativa (Brazil, since 2013), ITS – Instituto de Tecnologia e Sociedade (Brazil, since 2013), Data 4 Good (Brazil, since 2013) and CCPR – Centre for Civil and Political Rights (Switzerland, since 2009).

== Selected publications ==
- Solid Organizations in a Liquid World (Sur Journal, 2014)
- “Mismatch: why are human rights NGOs in emerging powers not emerging?” (Open Democracy, 2013)
- "Reflections on Foreign Policy on Human Rights of the Lula´s government" (Henrich Boll Foundation, 2011)
- "Brazil at the UN Human Rights Council: the need to overcome ambiguities” (Revista Política Externa, 2009)
- “The Role of NGOs in the UN Human Rights Council” (Sur Journal, 2007).
