= Sara Mohammad =

Swedish human rights activist

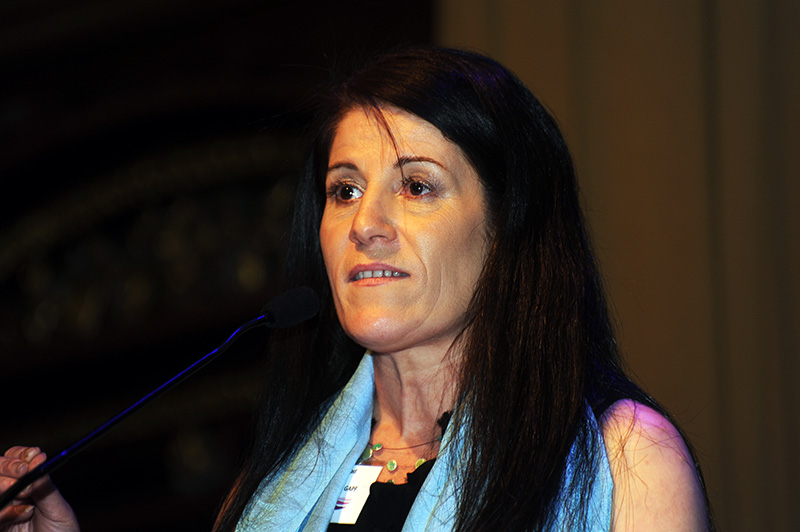
Sara Mohammad (2015)

Sara Mohammad (born 1967) is an Iraqi Kurdish-born Swedish human rights activist and pharmacist. She claimed asylum in Sweden as a quota refugee in 1993 after fleeing from her child marriage a day before the wedding. Her brother had threatened to shoot her, holding a Kalashnikov rifle to her head. After Fadime Şahindal was murdered in Uppsala in 2002, Mohammad founded Gapf (Swedish: Glöm Aldrig Pela och Fadime, literally 'Never Forget Pela and Fadime'), an organization which campaigns against honour killing.

== Biography ==
In 1984, when was she 17 years old, she was abused and threatened by her brother when she refused to enter into a child marriage. As a result, she had to flee from her family. Her own experiences have contributed to her unceasing fight against honour-related violence and oppression, both in Kurdistan and Sweden. In 2001, she founded GAPF to fight honour-related violence. GAPF's close collaboration with the Swedish authorities and with the administration of Östergötland has, since 2005, reinforced efforts to prevent honour-related violence, forced marriage and female genital mutilation. In March 2017, Linköping University's Faculty of Medicine and Health Sciences awarded her an honorary doctorate for her "fearless commitment for the rights of girls and young women" as well as for her struggle to prevent female genital mutilation.

Mohammad is critical of Islamism and the use of hijab. She has criticized Swedish feminists and politicians for their stands on issues regarding female Muslims, stating that they do not fight for the rights of Muslim immigrants because of fear of being accused of racism.

Despite her efforts, Mohammad does not believe the situation is improving in Sweden. "The events that reach the attention of the authorities are just the tip of the iceberg: we get a much fuller picture in GAPF. Girls and women are subject to increasing restrictions and questioning... Little girls in daycare are forced to wear headscarves to cover their hair: they become sexual objects even when very young."
