= Louisa Morton Greene =

American social reformer and writer

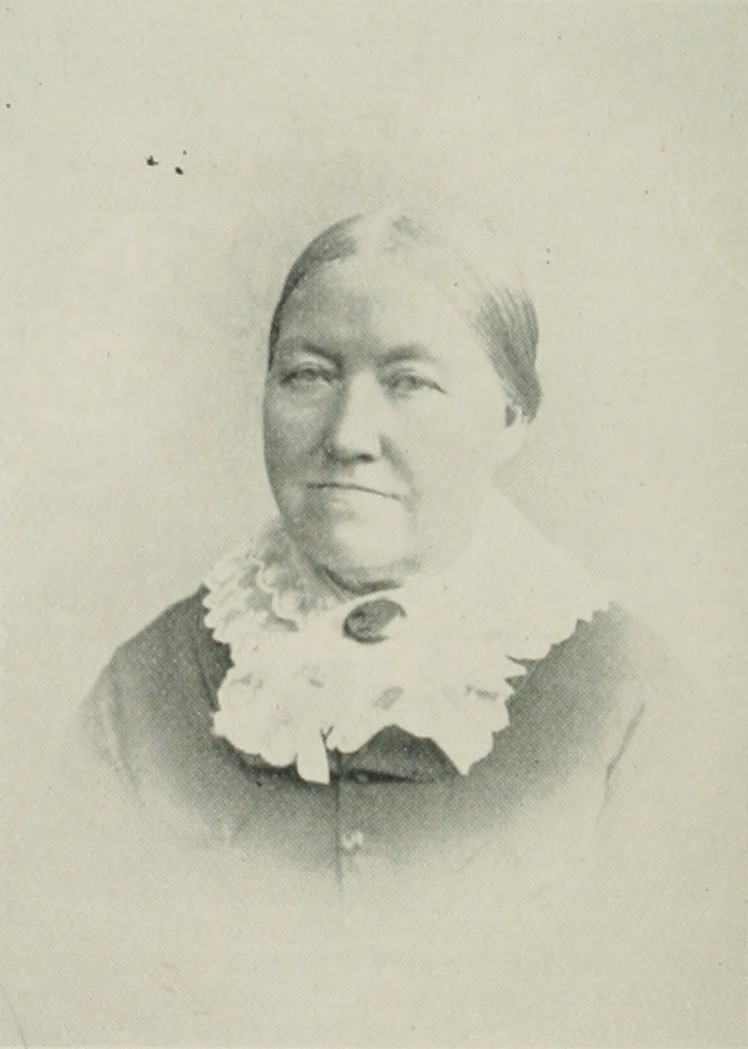
- Born: Louisa Morton Willard; May 23, 1819; Ashburnham, Massachusetts, U.S.
- Died: March 5, 1900 (aged 80)
- Resting place: Saint Paul's Cemetery, Alexandria, Virginia, U.S.
- Occupations: reformer, writer, abolitionist, suffragist, women's rights worker, temperance worker, and Civil War relief worker
- Spouse: Jonas Greene (m. 1841)
- Writing career
- Language: English

Louisa Morton Greene (née Louisa Morton Willard; May 23, 1819 - March 5, 1900) was a 19th-century American reformer, writer, abolitionist, suffragist, women's rights worker, temperance worker, and Civil War relief worker, from Massachusetts. Though she had limited schooling, she was the first American woman to rebel against discrimination towards women in industry, refusing to accept a woman's pay rate after doing a man's job. Greene was also an early champion of the temperance and suffrage causes in her writing and speaking engagements. She died in 1900.

== Early years and education ==
Louisa Morton Willard was born in Ashburnham, Massachusetts, May 23, 1819. She is a descendant from sturdy New England ancestors. Her father, Henry Willard. blacksmith and farmer, removed from Vermont and settled in Ashburnham in the early years of the present century. Bereft of both parents in early childhood, she was deprived of schooling and thrown upon her own resources at the age of 13.

== Career ==
She obtained employment in a woolen factory in Dedham, Massachusetts, and worked for several years for the pittance of US$1.00 to $2.00 per week and board, working 14 hours a day. There, upon the heads of bobbins, she learned to write. Notwithstanding her long hours of labor, she found time for constant improvement by reading and study. Her habits of strict economy enabled her to save a portion of her wages, and at the age of 17 she had $150.00 in the bank. Then came her first revolt against the injustice shown to women in industrial pursuits. Gross discrimination in the matter of wages was made, simply on the ground of sex. Called upon at one time to take a man's place at a spindle, she performed her duties well and to the satisfaction of her employer. When pay-day came around and she demanded the same compensation that the man had been securing, her request was received with amazement. The plucky young girl stood her ground and refused to return to the spindle unless paid at the same rate as the man whose place she was filling. She was promptly dismissed from the factory, to be recalled a few weeks later at a higher rate of pay.

In 1840, she taught school near Portsmouth, New Hampshire. There, she formed the acquaintance of Jonas Greene, of Maine, and they married in 1841. Mr. Greene subsequently became a prominent politician, representing his district in each branch of the State legislature for several successive terms. His success in life he ascribed largely to the cooperation and support of his wife. Removing with her husband to the then somewhat sparsely settled Oxford County, Maine, a new and active life opened for her. While performing faithfully her duties, she found time to enter into the philanthropic and reform work of the times. Early becoming a convert to the Water cure system of treating the sick, she familiarized herself with it and soon developed a remarkable ability for the care and treatment of the sick. Physicians and medicines were unknown in her household, and her skill was in demand in the community.

In 1850, Greene began to espouse the anti-slavery cause. She and others gathered women together and organized anti-slavery societies. Literature was distributed, Uncle Tom's Cabin was read, and she wrote many articles for the local papers. During the American Civil War, Greene's patriotic labors were untiring. When hospital supplies were needed, she collected, prepared and forwarded them. Greene's newspaper contributions for years covered a wide range of subjects. She was an early champion of the temperance and suffrage causes in her writing and speaking engagements. In 1869, she removed with her family to Manassas, Virginia, where her husband died in 1873. With advancing years, Greene withdrew from active philanthropic work. She died March 5, 1900.
