= Osai Ojigho =

Nigerian lawyer and human rights activist

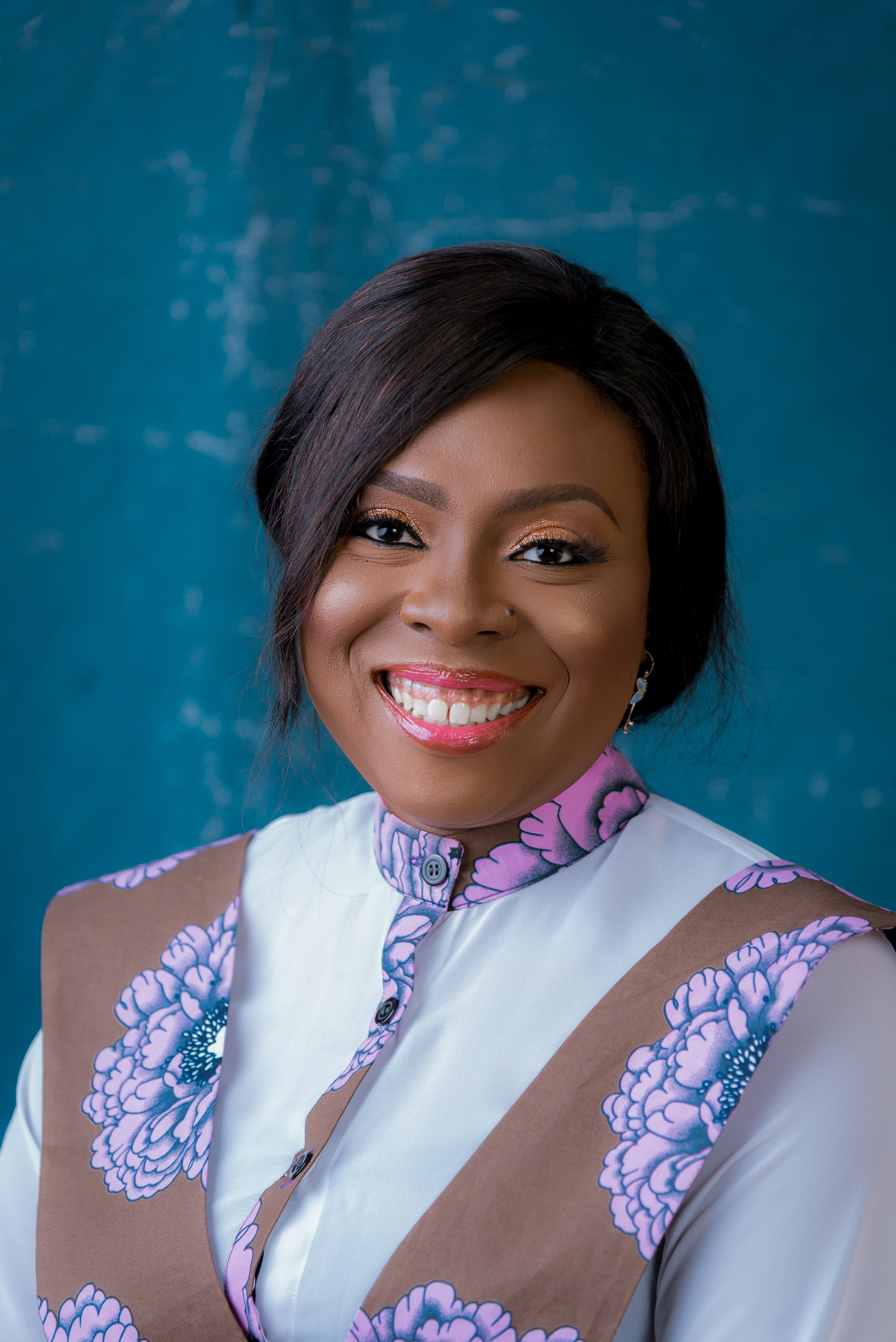
- Born: Osai; 1976 (age 49–50); Lagos, Nigeria
- Education: LLB University of Lagos; LLM University of Wolverhampton; Diploma in International Human Rights College of Law England and Wales.
- Occupations: Country Director, Amnesty International Nigeria
- Known for: Law, human rights, advocacy, gender equality
- Parents: Chief Mark Obu (father); Theresa (mother)
- Awards: African Feminist Forum

Osai Ojigho (born 1976) is a Nigerian human rights expert, lawyer and gender equality advocate, who as of 2021, is the Director of Amnesty International's national office in Nigeria. She serves on the Global Advisory Council of the Institute for African Women in Law (IAWL) and sits on the board of Alliances for Africa.

== Early life and education ==
Ojigho was born in Lagos State to the family of Chief Mark Obu and his wife Theresa. She obtained her (LLB) law degree at University of Lagos and a Master of Laws (LLM) degree from the University of Wolverhampton, United Kingdom. She was called to the Nigerian Bar in 2000 and obtained a practice Diploma in International Human Rights from the College of Law of England and Wales in 2010.

== Career ==
In 2017, Ojigho was appointed Country Director of Amnesty International in Nigeria, where she has overseen and participated in advocacy and social change campaigns including the Bring Back Our Girls and End SARS movement as well as lending the organisation's voice to various for human rights violations, social injustice, housing rights, and gender based sexual violence.

== Awards ==
In 2015, Ojigho was listed by the African Feminist Forum as one of 18 phenomenal African feminists to know and celebrate.
