= Miriam Margoth Martínez =

Colombian urban planner, human rights defender

Personal details
- Born: 2 March 1966 (age 60) Pasto, Nariño, Colombia
- Citizenship: Colombian
- Education: Universidad de Nariño
- Occupation: Human rights defender, Urban Planner

Miriam Margoth Martínez Díaz (born March 2, 1966, Pasto, Colombia) is a Colombian urban planner, human rights defender, and civil engineer. She holds a master's degree in administration from Charles III University of Madrid and has run as a candidate for mayor of Pasto.

== Early life ==
Martínez Díaz was born in Pasto, Columbia and is the second of seven children of Adiela Miriam Díaz and José Ignacio Martínez. She completed her primary education at a public school in the Miraflores neighborhood and her secondary education at Ciudad de Pasto CCP School. She later attended the University of Nariño.

== Career ==
As a manager at the Unidad Administrativa Especial de Servicios Públicos (UAESP) in Bogotá, Martínez Díaz worked to reduce public sanitation fees and integrated district recyclers into the work model. During her tenure, with Gustavo Petro as district mayor, her efforts led to a change in the city’s waste management operator. This decision faced resistance from the previous landfill operator, resulting in at least 33 complaints, spearheaded by lawyer Néstor Humberto Martínez, who attempted to block the new tender.

Martínez also oversaw significant improvements at the Doña Juana sanitary landfill, where she implemented a clay-based model that notably reduced odor and lowered the incidence of diseases among nearby residents. Additionally, she cut sanitation fees in Bogotá by half, recovering 63 billion pesos for the district without increasing the city's deficit. Despite these achievements, she was sanctioned by the Procurator General's Office with a ten-year disqualification from public office, following a complaint from the previous landfill operator, Proactiva Group. Martínez and others described the ruling as retaliatory. The investigative entity later closed the case, citing insufficient evidence, although Martínez had already served over half of the penalty.
