= Jocelyn Naupa =

Vanuatuan politician and activist

Jocelyn Naupa is a Ni-Vanuatu advocate for gender equality and women affairs in Vanuatu.

== Advocacy for women ==
In 2001 Naupa was elected to become a representative for the women in south Santo area. In 2005, she and other women from her area set up an association which was a committee based on violence against women, in which they would help give counselling to females who were victims of violence or discrimination. In 2010, she was elected by all the women representatives around Sanma, during a conference, to become the chair-lady of the overall women in Sanma province. She would negotiate with NGOS and various organizations to run training to do with CEDAW, good governance, trans piracy and accountability taught to the representative who would then go back and teach women in their own community. From 2011-2012 she was re-elected again to be as a chair-lady again and work at that position up to 2013. During this time she served three roles, not only was she a chair-lady she was also a representative in the provincial government and she was working under Vanuatu women center as a counselor for violence against women.

As a women's representative in the provincial government she would voice women’s thoughts for development and needs during the provincial councilors meeting. In the end of 2013 she resigned as the Sanma women’s chair-lady and woman representative in provincial government, because her husband was transferred to work in Erromango, his home island. However, this did not stop her from promoting women‘s matter as she set up a woman and disability council in Erromango. Various NGOs, such as Care international aided these councils by providing training's and awareness to the people. The following year (2014) she volunteered to take part in Care international’s climate change program. As a volunteer she was appointed to be the deputy CDC coordinator to where she shared some of her experiences, spread awareness about climate change and distributed food and water. In 2016, she joined Care international’s women and goal program and gender based violence program and visited Aniwa, Tanna and Erromango to carry out training to increase awareness.

== Awards ==
On 7 March 2017 the Australian high commission awarded her with the International Women’s Day Hanson Mataskelekele and Andy Lynch awards for Excellence in Leadership and Excellence in the Community Sector respectively.
