= Anna Lohse =

Anna Christine Abeline Lohse (1866–1942) was a Danish schoolteacher and women's rights activist from Odense on the Danish island of Funen. In addition to teaching at the same school for 52 years until her retirement in 1936, she was an active member of the Odense chapter of the Danish Women's Society from its establishment in 1890, becoming an honorary member in 1915. She fought for better education as a means of improving women's self-sufficiency and employment opportunities. In this connection, in 1891 she established an evening school which women could attend free of charge.

== Biography ==
Born on 4 November 1866 in Odense, Anna Christine Abeline Lohse was the daughter of the shoemaker Heinrich Lohse (1832–1903) and his wife Anne Cathrine née Nielsen (1839–1925). Keen to become a teacher since early childhood, she attended various schools in Odense before moving to Copenhagen where she trained to be a teacher at N. Zahle's School, earning her diploma in 1889.

She returned to Odense and joined the local school authority. She was engaged by Vestre Skole when it opened in 1897, remaining until her retirement in 1936. In addition to natural history, her main subject, she taught geography, arithmetic and religion.

Lohse was a pioneer of the women's movement in Odense. When the Danish Women's Society established a local branch there in June 1890, despite her young age she became an active member of the steering committee in the 1890s, chairing the organization in 1892 and again from 1894 to 1899. Inspired by Grundtvigian pedagogy, she addressed societal problems in the articles she contributed to the journal Kvinden & Samfundet (Women and Society). Here she linked women's problems with those of working men, maintaining that gender equality depended on dealing with the problems faced by working men. Only through improvements to their education could women hope to be recognized as independent, self-supporting individuals. Women needed to become politically active if the problems of workers were to be solved. As a result of her proposals, the Odense chapter of the Women's Society opened an evening school which women could attend free of charge. It operated until 1900.

Anna Lohse died in Odense on 3 October 1942. She had spent most of her life in the family home with her parents and her sister Kathrine.
