= Catherine Ouedraogo =

Human rights activist in Burkina Faso

- Born: 1 February 1962; Réo, Burkina Faso
- Other name: Catherine Ouedraogo-Kanssolé
- Occupations: Coordinator, Fondation Cardinale Emile Biyenda
- Known for: Human rights activism, poverty activism

Catherine Ouedraogo (born 1 February 1962, in Réo) is a Women Human Rights Defender and a farmer from Koho Gnabiro village in Burkina Faso. She has run the Fondation Cardinale Emile Biyenda shelter in Ouagadougou since 2005. The shelter takes in girls aged 12 to 18 who have survived rape, early and forced marriage and unwanted pregnancy. Between 2001 and 2009, the shelter accommodated at least 209 girls and their 168 children, who were either born there or taken in with their mothers.

== Life and work ==
Ouedraogo's work ranges from human rights to environmental protection and employment training. She and the shelter she runs have campaigned alongside Amnesty International for the rights of girls in Burkina Faso, as part of the campaign called "My Body, My Rights", which focused on forced and early marriage and inadequate access to contraception.

She has led communities in the pedagogical training methods for local soap production, which was sold locally, as well as the production of liquid soap. She is also responsible for the school registration of a large number of girls in a country where, according to the Women's World Summit Foundation, "schooling is free but not compulsory, and only about 29 percent of Burkina's primary school-age children receive a basic education."

As an environmentalist, she took action to protect community land by building anti-erosive sites, composting organic waste and safeguarding clearings.

== Selected awards ==
In 2009, she received a Laureates award for her creative innovations in rural life by the Women's World Summit Foundation. The prize honors her work in mobilizing rural populations throughout the entire East-Center Quada region of Burkina Faso.
