= Isnelle Amelin =

French feminist and union leader

Isnelle Amelin née Baret (1907–1994) was a French feminist, women's rights activist, and bank employee from the island of Réunion, where she is remembered for the important part she played in the left-wing Union des femmes de La Réunion from its establishment in 1958. A dedicated trade unionist and member of the CGT, she founded the Syndicat général des employés de banque et de commerce in 1945, the year when she was elected as one of the first women to serve on the municipal council of Saint-Denis. She continued her political support of the Communist party until she was seriously injured while trying to save a ballot box from right-wing militants in the 1956 legislative elections. She headed the Union des Femmes de La Réunion until she died in 1994.

== Biography ==
Born on 14 September 1907 in Saint-Leu, Isnelle Baret was the daughter of the forester Aimée Léopold Baret and Eugénie Gaspard. She attended private Catholic schools and received an elementary school certificate. By the time she was 25, she had lost her parents and her six siblings who, unable to afford treatment, had all died from malaria or tuberculosis. In 1941, she married Raoul Amelin, a police inspector and communist militant.

Encouraged by her husband, she became an active member of the CGT. As a bank employee, she founded the Syndicat général des employés de banque et de commerce where she served as secretary general from 1945 to 1955. As a member of the Comité Républicain d’Action Démocratique et Social (CRADS), she participated in the municipal elections of 1945, winning a seat on the city council of Saint-Denis until 1958 and then again from 1958 to 1964. She also became the first president of the local branch of the Communist Union des Femmes Françaises (UFF) in 1946.

In 1952, as CGT administrator, she inaugurated a nursery for household workers and supported the activities of the Syndicat des bonnes et des blanchisseuses, the union for housemaids and laundry workers. Actively supporting the fight for the decolonisation of La Réunion, she was seriously injured by right-wing activists while trying to protect a ballot box during the 1956 legislative elections. As a result of her activities, which were considered subversive, she was forced to retire when she was only 48.

She nevertheless continued to work as a women's rights activist within the Fédération réunionnaise de l'UFF, serving as president for the rest of her life. Isnelle Amelin died in Saint-Denis on 4 February 1994, aged 86, from an illness she had contracted two years earlier while undertaking humanitarian work in Madagascar.
