= Mary Hynes Swanton =

(1861–1940) trade unionist

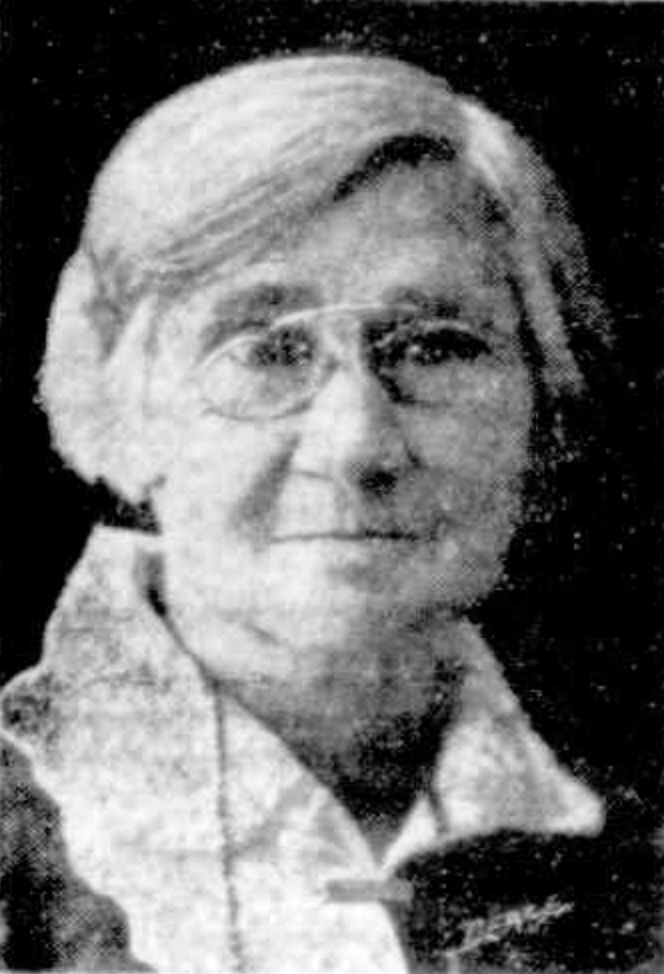
- Swanton in 1932
- Born: 22 June 1861; West Melbourne, Melbourne, Victoria, Australia
- Died: 25 November 1940 (aged 79); Sydney, New South Wales, Australia
- Known for: anti-conscriptionist, trade union official, women's activist

Mary Hynes Swanton (22 June 1861 – 25 November 1940) was an Australian trade unionist.

== Biography ==
Mary "Mamie" Hynes Swanton was born 22 June 1861 to James Swanton and Sarah Marie, née Connelly in Melbourne. Her father was a car proprietor and both parents were born in Ireland. She got her education through the Benedictine nuns. In 1889, she was working as a tailoress in Western Australia. She went to a Women's suffrage meeting in Perth in 1896. Swanton became a member of the Australian Natives' Association. She went on to be the first woman to be awarded honorary life membership in 1900. Swanton also helped found the Australian Women's Association, the Karrakatta Club.

Swanton was a Founder president of the Perth Tailoresses' Union from 1900 to 1905 until it became part of the Tailors' Union. She was the representative to the Trades and Labour Council. Her main area of activism was to reduce child labour in the Perth clothing trades followed by health issues. Swanton became the first woman elected president of the Tailors and Tailoresses' Union of Western Australia in 1907. In 1913 she moved to Kalgoorlie to live with her brother and became his housekeeper. She continued to work for the local A.N.A. and wrote articles regularly until she returned to Subiaco. She opened the Perth Working Girls' Club in the late 1920s. She toured Britain and the United States before returning to live in Sydney where she died on 25 November 1940. Swanton is buried in Rookwood cemetery.

Swanton Street in the Canberra suburb of Chisholm is named in her honour.
