= Nurungul Tohti =

Uyghur activist in China (born 1980)

- Born: 1980 (age 45–46)
- Occupation: Activist

Nurungul Tohti (born 1980) is a Uyghur activist in China. She is considered by TIME magazine to be part of a "rapidly growing group of activists fighting for their families and communities."

== Biography ==
Tohti comes from the Uchturpan county in Aksu. She was working as a fruit seller in Dalian. When her son was kidnapped in 2009, she rescued him on her own by "confronting the abductors herself." After she recovered her son, she went to officials in the local government to ask for help in prosecuting her son's kidnappers. She was denied redress and appealed to authorities. She appealed to the United Nations, and was arrested on June 4, 2012, and held for eight months.

As an activist who is working for justice in her son's case, she has been jailed three times. Tohti believes that as a minority in China, she is being discriminated against and has appealed her case to Beijing in June 2015.

== Works ==
- Radio Free Asia (21 November 2014). 'It's not OK.': The illustrated stories of women caught in the struggle for human rights in China, North Korea, and Southeast Asia. Radio Free Asia. pp. 24–. GGKEY:YR19P7A86E4.
