= Thora Ingemann Drøhse =

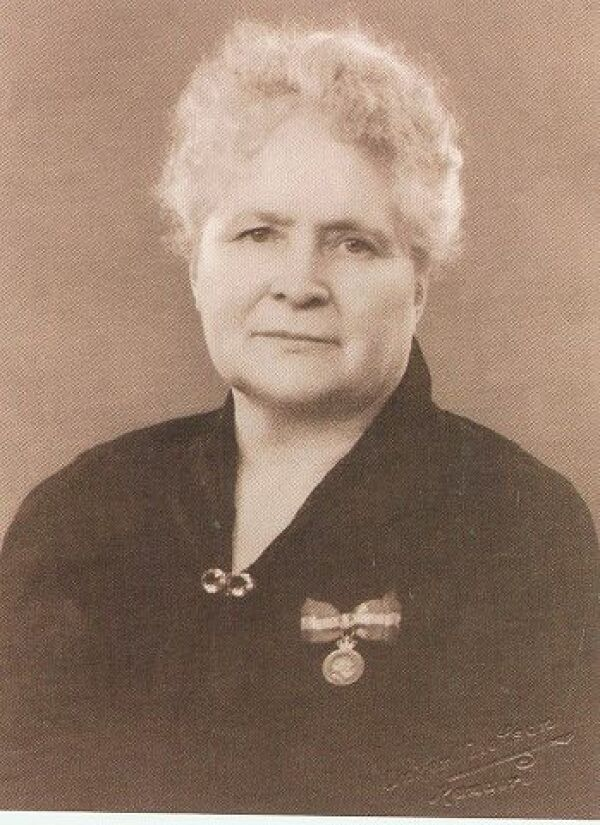
Thora Ingemann Drøhse

Thora Ingemann Drøhse née Nielsen (1867–1948) was a Danish temperance campaigner and women's rights activist. After being inspired to fight for abstention from alcohol by the priest Julius Ifversen (1863–1927), she was assigned to the Jutland district of Himmerland and Vendsyssel where she became a prominent and effective speaker for the cause. From her work on abstinence, she moved smoothly into women's rights as she believed that in the end women were the ones who suffered most from excessive drinking. In 1907, she established the Randers branch of Kvindevalgretsforeningen, the Danish Women's Suffrage Association, chairing it until 1915 when women obtained the vote. In 1925, she successfully established the Randers chapter of the Danish Women's Society, hosting the organization's national meeting the following year.

== Biography ==
Born in Copenhagen on 19 February 1867, Thora Ingemann Jensen was the daughter of Johan Vilhelm Jensen (born c. 1840) and his wife Alvine Petronelle Amalie née Kieler (born c. 1844). In June 1895, she married the newspaper editor Engelbert Paulus Laurentius Michael Georg Drøhse (1864–1940).

Thora Nielsen was raised in a craftsman's home in the Nørrebro district of Copenhagen. As a young woman, she became active in Sunday school where she met the priest Julius Ifversen and his circle of collaborators. Her attention was drawn to how alcoholism was causing serious problems in working-class homes in the area. As a result, in 1889 she joined the Nørrebro Abstinence Association (Nørrebros Afholdsforening). In the early 1890s, she developed into a talented and effective speaker for Denmark's Abstinence Association. After her marriage in 1895 and her move with her husband to Randers, she was assigned to fight the misuse of alcohol in the Himmerland and Vendsyssel district of Jutland where she succeeded in convincing some 4,000 people to give up drinking. She continued her involvement as a board member until 1946.

It was easy for Drøhse to begin supporting the women's movement as she could see that women were the ones who suffered most from men's excessive drinking. In 1907, she established the Women's Suffrage Association in Randers which she headed until women obtained the right to vote in 1915. In 1925, where others had failed she succeeded in founding a branch of the Danish Women's Society in Randers. In 1926, her branch hosted to association's annual meeting. By 1931, with its 564 members, her chapter had become one of the largest in Denmark. She headed the branch until 1937 when she became an honorary member. In 1931, she was appointed a member of the national organization's central board.

Thora Ingemann Drøhse died in Randers on 14 April 1948.

== Awards ==
For her numerous contributions, in 1937 Drøhse was awarded the Royal Medal of Recompense.
