= Nyaradzo Mashayamombe =

Zimbabwean activist, entrepreneur and singer

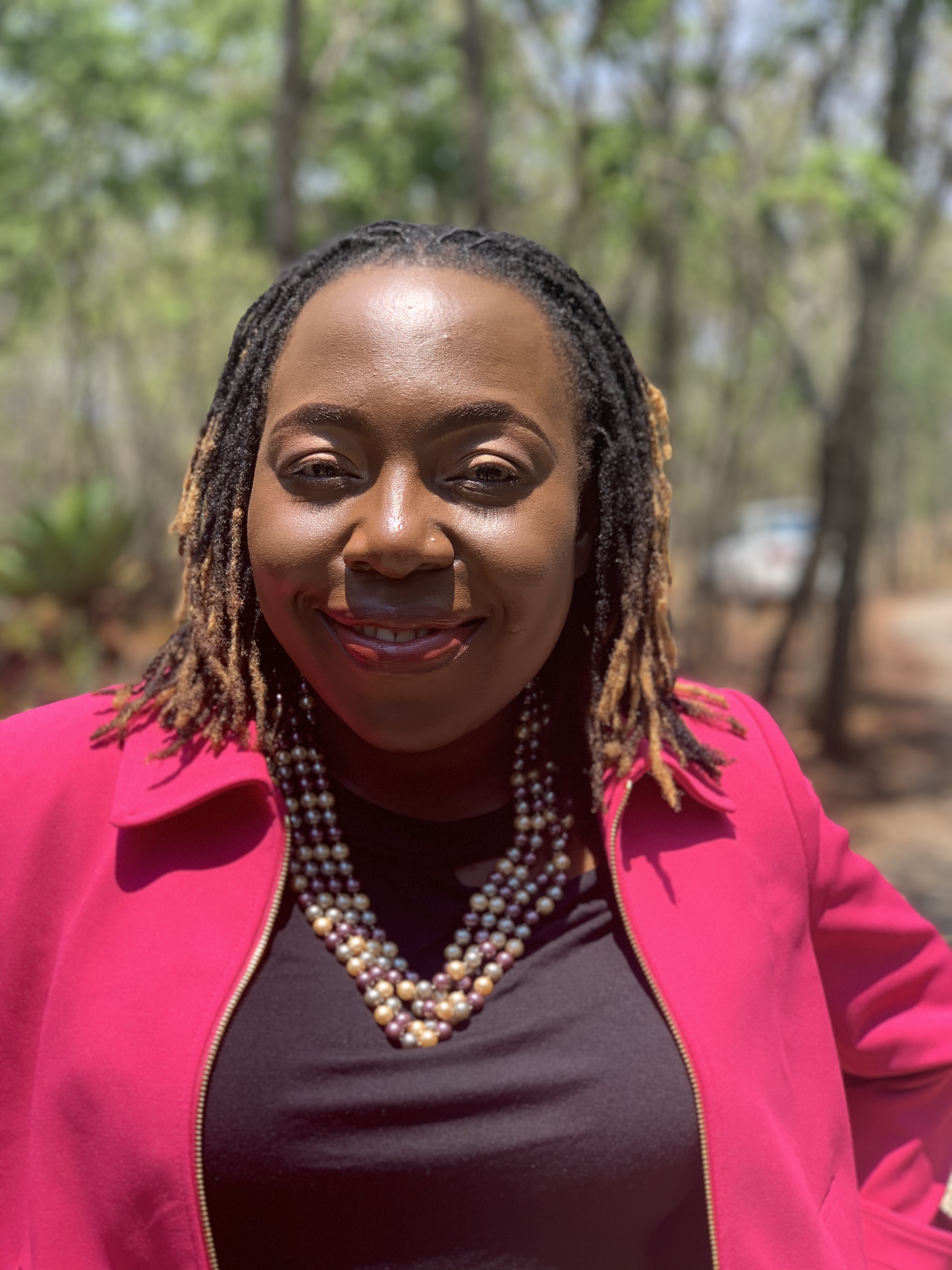
- Nyaradzo Mashayamombe in 2019
- Born: Nyaradzo Mashayamombe
- Education: Women's University in Africa (MSc)
- Occupations: Human Rights Activism; Entrepreneur; TV Host; Producer; Singer; Poet
- Years active: 2010–present

Nyaradzo 'Nyari' Mashayamombe is a Zimbabwean women's and human rights activist and campaigner, a media entrepreneur, and a part-time recording afro-jazz singer and poet. She is the founding executive director of Tag A Life International Trust (TaLI), an advocacy organization that promotes girls' and young women's rights and empowerment in Zimbabwe. Nyari is also the founder and CEO of Identities Media Holdings, a company that produces content that is featured on the only free to air national television station in Zimbabwe (ZBC TV) and on social media. As a recording artist, Nyari has released three studio albums.

== Biography ==
Nyari holds a Master of Science degree in Development Studies from the Women's University in Africa.

She is the founding executive director of Tag A Life International Trust (TaLI), an advocacy organization that promotes girls’ and young women’s rights and empowerment in Zimbabwe. Founded in 2010, TaLI has advocated for Zimbabwe to provide state funded basic education for more than 500,000 who were shut out of school for failure to pay school fees.

Nyari is also the founder and CEO of Identities Media Holdings, a company that produces content featured on the Zimbabwe Broadcasting Corporation (ZBC TV). Her self-hosted talk show, called "Identities/Umhlobo/Zvatiri", appears on ZBC TV and on social media.

Nyari is a board member of the CIVICUS Alliance. Previously she has been a board member of the Women’s Coalition of Zimbabwe as well as the Community Solutions Alumni Board.

== Music ==
As a recording artist, Nyari has released three studio albums to date. Her third album, titled Zvatiri, released in 2015. The 15-track afro-jazz album talks about Africa, social issues, love, gospel, accountability and governance. One of the songs on the album, called "Cry", was a collaboration between Nyari and the late Chiwoniso Maraire. Nyari also collaborated with the late Zimbabwean musician Cephas Mashakada.

== Awards and recognition ==
In 2013, she was recognized as one of Ten Outstanding Young People in Zimbabwe in the category of "Contribution to Children, World Peace, and Human Rights" by the Junior Chamber International. In 2015 she was awarded the Community Champion of the Year honors through the Zimbabwe International Women Awards. In March 2021, she was the first person to advocate for a female second Vice President of Zimbabwe on her social media platforms and her website, Identities Media Holdings, following VP Kembo Mohadi's resignation.
