= Roshini Thinakaran =

Roshini Thinakaran is a National Geographic Emerging Explorer (named in 2007), TED Global Fellow, Journalist, Photographer, Researcher, Humanitarian, and Anthropologist (Cultural). She also is a documentary filmmaker from Sri Lanka and the United States. Her fields of study include: women, filmmakers, and war.

== Biography ==
Thinakaran was born in Sri Lanka and moved to the United States at age seven. Her family was fleeing the civil war going on at the time. Thinakaran attended George Mason University where she received a bachelor's degree in communication studies and a minor in journalism. In 2005, she lived in Beirut, Lebanon for about six months.

== Work ==
Thinakaran's first short film was made about Ellen Johnson Sirleaf, president of Liberia. The film was very short, but it "gained the attention of National Geographic." She became part of the National Geographic Society's Emerging Explorers Program and received a $10,000 grant.

Much of her work has focused on researching and profiling the lives of women living in post-conflict zones including Iraq, Liberia, Lebanon and Afghanistan. She established Women at the Forefront in 2005, a multimedia project that examines war through the eyes of women. Thinakaran spent 14 months in Iraqi neighborhoods making Women at the Forefront. The goal of her project was to raise money and awareness for women in war zones and to support schools once the fighting ended. Thinakaran's coverage and support of women living in war zones was inspired by the time she lived in Iraq for 14 months, watching as women endured the conditions of war. In her project, the countries of Iraq, Sudan, Afghanistan, Sri Lanka, and possibly Liberia, will be featured.

Her documentary, What Was Promised (2008), focused on the US-led initiative to integrate Iraqi women into the Iraqi Security Forces. It premiered at the National Geographic All Roads Film Project.

In an interview with Michelle Johnson, Thinakaran cited Elie Wiesel as a writer who has inspired her when she was younger.

== Philanthropy ==
Thinakaran created a non-profit called Bridge the Gap Media, which advocates for education in regions that are in war zones. The non-profit supports women living in war zones to study abroad through scholarships that are secured by the non-profit. Also, it offers resources to elementary schools that have recently experienced, or come out of, war.

== Films ==
- Women at the Forefront (2005)
- What Was Promised (2008)
- Journey OnEarth (film series, 2011)
