= Thora Pedersen =

Danish trades unionist and women's rights activist

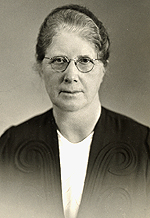
Thora Pedersen

Marie Thora Frederikke Pedersen (1875–1954) was a Danish teacher, school inspector and women's rights proponent who was active in the Danish Union of Teachers (Danmarks Lærerforening) and the Danish Women's Society (Dansk Kvindesamfund). As a representative of these organizations on the parliamentary salary commission established in 1917, she was instrumental in achieving progress on civil servants' pay. Her efforts led to the Pay Act (Lønningsloven) of 1919 which introduced equal pay for men and women. She also succeeded in introducing improvements for Danish schools based on her international experience in education.

== Biography ==
Born on 21 October 1875 in Øster Hurup near Hadsund in the east of Jutland, Marie Thora Frederikke Pedersen was the daughter of the schoolteacher Niels Christian Pedersen (1843–1941) and Karen Marie Andersen (1847–1924). Against her father's will, she attended N. Zahle's School in Copenhagen to train as a teacher. After qualifying in 1900, she returned to Jutland where she was employed by the Aalborg school authority from 1901 to 1945.

Pedersen is remembered above all for her work between 1915 and 1919 on achieving equal pay. After wages for civil servants had fallen by more than 10% during the First World War, the Danish Union of Teachers (Danmarks Lærerforening, DLF) initiated the reform process. Together with Marie Mortensen, Johanne M. Sørensen and Lucie Jensen, Pedersen was elected to DLF's executive board in 1916, where she called for equal pay for equal work but faced opposition from the union's representatives. In 1917, the Danish parliament Rigsdagen established a committee on pay for civil servants. With the support of the Women's Society and Copenhagen's Teachers' Association, Pedersen and two other representatives were appointed to the committee. Once again, she faced fierce opposition but in the end her views were supported. As a result, the Pay Act (Lønningsloven) of 1919 introduced equal pay for men and women.

From 1919, Pedersen was in introducing several improvements to the curriculum in Danish schools, culminating in the 1937 Schools Act (Skoleloven). On the political front, she was a member of the Social Liberal Party, serving on the executive board from 1918 to 1926 and from 1939 to 1943 was a member of Aalborg's city council. From 1908 to 1915, she headed Aalborg's Women's Suffrage Association.

Thora Pedersen died on 29 October 1954 in Aalborg where she is buried.
