= Dossi Sekonou Gloria Agueh =

Beninese activist

Dossi Sekonou Gloria Agueh is a Beninese women's rights activist. She is the founder and president of the Network of Women Leaders for Development (RFLD).

In 2023 she received an honorary award from Humanitarian Awards Global.
