= Ørum =

Ørum or Orum may refer to:

== Places ==
- Ørum (Sønderlyng), a parish and village in Viborg Municipality, Denmark
- Ørum, Brønderslev Municipality, a parish and small village in Brønderslev Municipality, Denmark
- Ørum Djurs, a parish and village in Norddjurs Municipality, Denmark
- Ørum Church (Norddjurs Municipality), a church in Denmark
- Ørum Church (Skive Municipality), a church in Denmark
- Orum, Nebraska, a community in the United States

== People ==
- Ian Orum (1955–2020), English rugby player
- John Orum (died 1430s), English academic
- Julia Anna Orum (1843-1904), American educator, lecturer, and author
- Tania Ørum (born 1945), Danish literary historian
