= Bibliography of encyclopedias: literature =

List of encyclopedias and biographical dictionaries

This is a list of encyclopedias as well as encyclopedic and biographical dictionaries published on the subject of literature in any language.

Entries are in the English language unless specifically stated as otherwise.

== General ==
- Benét, William Rose. Benét's Reader's Encyclopedia. 3rd ed., HarperCollins, 1987.
- Boynton, Victoria, Jo Malin, Emmanuel S. Nelson. Encyclopedia of women's autobiography. Greenwood Press, 2005. ISBN 0313327378.
- Brewer, Ebenezer Cobham (1870). Brewer's Dictionary of Phrase and Fable. Berlin: Mittler.
- Brewer, Ebenezer Cobham (1899). Reader's Handbook of Famous Names in Fiction, Allusions, References, Proverbs, Plots, Stories, and Poems. London: Lippincott.
- Brewer's Dictionary of 20th-Century Phrase and Fable. Houghton Mifflin, 1992.
- Cassell's Encyclopedia of World Literature. Morrow, 1953.
- Cousin, John W. (1 March 2003). A Short Biographical Dictionary of English Literature. Kessinger Publishing. ISBN 978-0-7661-4348-7.
- Gubernatis, Angelo de (1905). Dictionnaire international des escrivains du monde latin (in Italian). Rome: Auteur.
- Horn, Maurice. World Encyclopedia of Comics. Chelsea House, 1976.
- Keller, Helen Rex (1929). Reader's Digest of Books. New York: Macmillan.
- Kohn, George Childs, Leonard Latkovski. Dictionary of historic documents. Facts on File, 2003. ISBN 0816047723.
- Kurian, George Thomas. World Press Encyclopedia. Facts on File, 1982.
- Magill, Frank Northen, Tracy Irons-Georges. Cyclopedia of world authors. Salem Press, 2004. ISBN 158765122X.
- Martin, Edward A., Peter Froggatt. A biographical encyclopedia of medical travel authors. Edwin Mellen Press, 2010–. ISBN 9780773436817.
- Miller, Jane Eldridge. Who's who in contemporary women's writing. Routledge, 2002. ISBN 0415159814.
- Poggendorff, Johann Christian. J.C. Poggendorffs biographisch-literarisches handwörterbuch zur geschichte der exacten wissenschaften. J.A. Barth, 1863–1995.
- Polking, Kirk. Writing A to Z: The Terms, Procedures and Facts of the Writing Business Defined, Explained, and Put Within Reach. Writer's Digest, 1990.
- Powell, John (2001). Biographical Dictionary of Literary Influences: The Nineteenth Century, 1800–1914. Greenwood Publishing Group. ISBN 978-0-313-30422-4.
- Pribić, Rado. Nobel laureates in literature: A biographical dictionary. Garland, 1990. ISBN 0824057414.
- Diccionario de la Literatura Chilena (in Spanish). Andres Bello.
- Ranke, Kurt; Bausinger, Hermann; Brednich, Rolf Wilhelm (2010). Enzyklopädie des Märchens (Encyclopedia of Fairy Tales) (in German). Walter de Gruyter. ISBN 978-3-11-023767-2.
- Sabin, Joseph, Wilberforce Eames, R. W. G. Vail Bibliographical Society of America. A dictionary of books relating to America, from its discovery to the present time. Joseph Sabin, 1868–1936.
- Samiuddin, Abida (1 August 2007). Encyclopaedic Dictionary Of Urdu Literature (2 Vols. Set). Global Vision Publishing Ho. ISBN 978-81-8220-191-0.
- Sebeok, Thomas A. Encyclopedic Dictionary of Semiotics. Walter de Gruyter, 1986.
- Seigneuet, Jean-Charles. Dictionary of Literary Themes and Motifs. Greenwood, 1988.
- Sherman, Joseph. Writers in Yiddish. Thomson Gale, 2007. ISBN 9780787681517.
- Who was who among English and European authors, 1931–1949: Based on entries which first appeared in The author's and writer's who's who and reference guide originally compiled by Edward Martell and L.G. Pine and in Who's who among living authors of older nations, originally compiled by Alberta Lawrence. Gale Research, 1978. ISBN 978-0-8103-0400-0.

=== Religious literature ===
- Snodgrass, Mary Ellen. Encyclopedia of world scriptures. McFarland, 2001. ISBN 0786410051.

==== Bible ====
- Achtemeier, Paul J. Harper's Bible Dictionary. HarperCollins, 1985.
- Allmen, Jean Jacques von, ed. (1958). Vocabulaire biblique [A Companion to the Bible]. New York: Oxford University Press.
- Baker Encyclopedia of the Bible. Baker Book House, 1988.
- Balz, Horst and Gerhard Schneider, ed. (1980–1983). Exegetisches Worterbuch zum Neuen Testament (in German). Stuttgart: Kohlhammer.
- Bauer, Johannes B., ed. (1981). Encyclopedia of Biblical Theology: The Complete Sacramentum Mundi. New York: Crossroad.
- Botterweck, G. Johannes and Helmer Ringgren, ed. (1974–1980). Theologisches Worterbuch zum Alten Testament [Theological Dictionary of the Old Testament]. Grand Rapids, MI: Wm. B. Eerdmans.
- Bridges, Ronald; Weigle, Luther A. (1960). The Bible Word Book Concerning Obsolete or Archaic Words in the King James Version of the Bible. New York: Nelson.
- Bromiley, Geoffrey W., ed. (1979–1982). The International Standard Bible Encyclopedia. Grand Rapids, MI: Eerdmans.
- Brown, Colin, ed. (1975–1982). The New International Dictionary of New Testament Theology [Theologisches Begriffslexicon zum Neuen Testament]. Exeter: Paternoster Pr.
- Brownrigg, Robert (1971). Who's Who in the New Testament.
- Buttrick, George Arthur, ed. (1962). The Interpreter's Dictionary of the Bible. New York: Abingdon. ISBN 9780687192717.
- Cheyne, Thomas Kelly and J. S. Black, ed. (1899–1903). Encyclopedia Biblica. New York: Macmillan.
- Comay, Joan (1971). Who's Who in the Old Testament.
- Corswant, Willy, ed. (1960). A Dictionary of Life in Bible Times [Dictionnaire d'archeologie biblique]. New York: Oxford University Press.
- Crim, Keith, ed. (1976). The Interpreter's Dictionary of the Bible, Supplementary Volume. Nashville: Abingdon. ISBN 9780687192694.
- Deen, Edith (1955). All of the Women of the Bible. New York: Harper.
- Dheilly, Joseph (1964). Dictionnaire biblique (in French). Desclee.
- Douglas, J. D., ed. (1982). New Bible Dictionary (2nd. ed.). Wheaton, IL: Tyndale House.
- Freedman, Davie Noel. The Anchor Bible Dictionary. Doubleday, 1992.
- Gehman, Henry Snyder (1970). The New Westminster Dictionary of the Bible. Philadelphia: Westminster Pr.
- Genz, William. Dictionary of Bible and Religion. Abingdon, 1986.
- Harris, R. Laird, ed. (1980). Theological Wordbook of the New Testament. Chicago: Moody Pr.
- Hartman, Louis F. (1963). Encyclopedic Dictionary of the Bible [Bijbels woordenboek]. New York: McGraw-Hill.
- Hastings, James, ed. (1898–1904). Dictionary of the Bible. New York: Scribner.
- Hastings, James, ed. (1906–1908). Dictionary of Christ and his Gospels. New York: Scribner.
- Hastings, James (1963). Grant, Frederick C. and H. H. Rowley (ed.). Dictionary of the Bible (revised ed.). Scribner.
- Hastings, James, ed. (1916–1922). Dictionary of the Apostolic Church. New York: Scribner.
- Holman Bible Dictionary. Holman, 1991.
- Illustrated Bible Dictionary. Tyndale House, 1980.
- Jeffrey, David Lyle. A Dictionary of Biblical Tradition in English Literature. Eerdmans, 1992.
- Jenni, Ernst, ed. (1971–1976). Theologisches Handworterbuch zum Alten Testament (in German). Munchen: C. Kaiser.
- Kittel, Gerhard, ed. (1964–1976). Theological Dictionary of the New Testament [Theologisches Worterbuch zum Neuen Testament]. Grand Rapids, MI: Eerdmans.
- Leon-Dufour, Xavier, ed. (1973). Dictionary of Biblical Theology [Vocabulaire de theologie biblique]. New York: Seabury Pr.
- Lockyear, Herbert, ed. (1958). All the Men of the Bible. Grand Rapids, MI: Zondervan.
- Lockyear, Herbert, ed. (1969). All the Trades and Occupations of the Bible. Grand Rapids, MI: Zondervan.
- McKenzie, John L., ed. (1965). Dictionary of the Bible. Milwaukee: Bruce.
- Metzger, Bruce and Michael D. Coogan. Oxford Companion to the Bible. Oxford University Press, 1993.
- Meyers, Allen. Eerdman's Bible Dictionary. Eerdmans, 1987.
- Miller, Madeleine Sweeny and J. Lane Miller, ed. (1973). Harper's Bible Dictionary (8th. ed.). New York: Harper & Row.
- Mills, Watson. Mercer Dictionary of the Bible. Mercer University Press, 1990.
- Moller-Christensen and Arne Unhjem (1965). Encyclopedia of Bible Creatures. Philadelphia: Fortress.
- New Unger's Bible Dictionary. rev. ed., Moody, 1988.
- Odelain, O. and R. Seguineau, ed. (1981). Dictionary of Proper Names and Places in the Bible [Dictionnaire des noms propres de la Bible]. New York: Doubleday.
- Osterloh, Edo; Hans Engall, eds. (1959). Biblisch-theologisches Handworterbuch zur Lutherbibel und zu neueren Ubersetzungen (in German) (2nd. ed.). Gottingen: Vandenhoeck & Ruprecht.
- Packer, James I., ed. (1980). The Bible Almanac. Nashville, TN: Thomas Nelson. ISBN 9780840751621.
- Pfeiffer, Charles F.; Howard F. Vos, John Rea, eds. (1975). The Wycliffe Bible Encyclopedia. Chicago: Moody Pr.
- Reicke, Bo Ivar and Leonhard Rost, ed. (1962–1979). Biblisch-historisches Handworterbuch. Gottingen: Vandenhoeck & Ruprecht.
- Richards, Lawrence. Revell's Bible Dictionary. Revell, 1990.
- Richardson, Alan, ed. (1950). A Theological Word Book of the Bible. London: SCM Pr.
- Soulen, Richard N., ed. (1976). Handbook of Biblical Criticism. Atlanta: John Knox Press. ISBN 9780804200448.
- Steinmuller, John E. and Kathryn Sullivan, ed. (1956). Catholic Biblical Encyclopedia. New York: J. F. Wagner.
- Turner, Nicholas, ed. (1982). Handbook for Biblical Studies. Philadelphia: Westminster. ISBN 9780664244361.
- Vigouroux, Fulcran Gregoire and Louis Pirot, ed. (1907–1983). Dictionnaire de la Bible (in French). Paris: Letouzey.
- Who's Who in the Bible. New York: Bonanza. 1980. ISBN 9780517321706.
- Zohary, Michael (1982). Plants of the Bible. Cambridge: Cambridge University Press. ISBN 9780521249263.
- Zondervan Pictorial Encyclopedia of the Bible. Zondervan, 1974.

===== Biblical archaeology =====
- Avi-Yonah, Michael, ed. (1975–1978). Encyclopedia of Archaeological Excavations in the Holy Land [Entsiklopedyah la-hafrot arke'ologiyoi be-Erets Yisrael]. Englewood Cliffs, NJ: Prentice-Hall.
- Blaiklock, Edward M. and R. K. Harrison, ed. (1983). The New International Dictionary of Biblical Archaeology. Grand Rapids, MI: Regency Reference Library, Zondervan.
- Negev, Avraham, ed. (1972). Archaeological Encyclopedia of the Holy Land. New York: Putnam's.
- Pfeiffer, Charles F., ed. (1966). The Biblical World: A Dictionary of Biblical Archaeology. Grand Rapids, MI: Baker Book House.
- Stern, Ephraim. The New Encyclopedia of Archaeological Excavations in the Holy Land. rev. ed., Simon & Schuster, 1993.

=== Quotations ===
- Ayer, A. J., Jane O'Grady. A dictionary of philosophical quotations. Blackwell Publishers, 1992. ISBN 0631170154.
- Bartlett, John (1855). Familiar Quotations.
- Benham, William Gurney (1907). Benham's Book of quotations, proverbs, and household words.
- Gaither, Carl C., Alma E. Cavazos-Gaither, Andrew Slocombe. Naturally speaking: A dictionary of quotations on biology, botany, nature and zoology. Institute of Physics, 2001. ISBN 0750306815.
- Gaither, Carl C., Alma E. Cavazos-Gaither, Andrew Slocombe. Practically speaking: A dictionary of quotations on engineering, technology, and architecture. Institute of Physics, 1999. ISBN 0750305940.
- Hoyt, Jehiel Keeler (1882). Hoyt's new cyclopedia of practical quotations drawn from the speech and literature of all nations, ancient and modern, classic and popular, in English and foreign text. Berlin: Mittler.
- Ratcliffe, Susan. People on people: The Oxford dictionary of biographical quotations. Oxford University Press, 2001. ISBN 0198662610.
- Wagman, Morton.Historical dictionary of quotations in cognitive science: A treasury of quotations in psychology, philosophy, and artificial intelligence. Greenwood Press, 2000. ISBN 0313312842.

==== Arabic and Persian ====
- Field, Claud (1911). Dictionary of Oriental Quotations (Arabic and Persian). New York: Macmillan.

==== Chinese ====
- Ch'êng yü k'ao; A Manual of Chinese quotations. Hong Kong: Kelly and Walsh. 1903.

==== French ====
- Harbottle, Thomas Benfield and P. H. Dalbiac (1901). Dictionary of quotations (French and Italian). New York: Macmillan.

==== German ====
- Büchmann, Georg (1866). Geflügelte Worte.
- Dalbiac, Lilian (1906). Dictionary of quotations (German) with author and subject indexes. New York: Macmillan.

==== Italian ====
- Finzi, Giuseppe (1902). Dizionario di citazioni latine ed italiane. Milano: Sandron.
- Fumagalli, Giuseppe (1914–1918). Chi l'ha detto?.
- Harbottle, Thomas Benfield. Dictionary of quotations, Italian. Sonnenschein; Macmillan.

==== Latin and Greek ====
- Harbottle, Thomas Benfield (1906). Dictionary of quotations (classical). London: Sonnenschein.
- Harbottle, Thomas Benfield. Dictionary of quotations: Latin. Sonnenschein; Macmillan. 1909.
- Ramage, Craufurd Tait (1895). Beautiful thoughts from Greek authors, with English translations. London: Routledge.
- Ramage, Craufurd Tait (1895). Beautiful thoughts from Latin authors, with English translations. London: Routledge.

==== Spanish ====
- Harbottle, Thomas Benfield and Hume, Martin (1907). Dictionary of Quotations (Spanish) with subject and authors' index. New York: Macmillan.

=== Regional literatures ===
==== African literature ====
- Gomes, Aldónio, Fernanda Cavacas. Dicionário de autores de literaturas africanas de língua portuguesa. Caminho, 1997. ISBN 9722111558. (Portuguese).

==== American (U.S.) literature ====
- Alderman, E. A. and J. C. Harris (1908–1923). Library of southern literature. New Orleans: Martin and Hoyt.
- Bain, Robert, Joseph M. Flora. Contemporary poets, dramatists, essayists, and novelists of the South: a bio-bibliographical sourcebook. Greenwood Press, 1994. ISBN 9780313287657.
- Bain, Robert, Joseph M. Flora, Louis Decimus Rubin. Southern writers: A biographical dictionary. Louisiana State University Press, 1980. ISBN 0807103543.
- Benét, William Rose. Benét's Reader's Encyclopedia. 3rd ed., HarperCollins, 1987.
- Bobinski, George S., Jesse Hauk Shera, Bohdan S. Wynar. Dictionary of American library biography. Libraries Unlimited, 1978. ISBN 0872871800.
- Brumble, H. David. An annotated bibliography of American Indian and Eskimo autobiographies. University of Nebraska Press, 1981. ISBN 0803211759.
- Cambridge Guide to English Literature.Cambridge, 1983.
- Davis, Arthur Paul, J. Saunders Redding, Joyce Ann Joyce. The new cavalcade: African American writing from 1760 to the present. Howard University Press, 1991–1992.
- Davis, Gwenn, Beverly A. Joyce. Personal writings by women to 1900: A bibliography of American and British writers. University of Oklahoma Press, 1989. ISBN 0806122064.
- Drabble, Margaret. The Oxford Companion to English Literature. 5th ed., Oxford, 1985.
- Duyckinck, Evert Augustus and Duyckinck, G. I. (1875). Cyclopedia of American literature. Philadelphia: Baxter.
- Elder, John. American nature writers. Charles Scribner's Sons, 1996. ISBN 0684196921.
- Flora, Joseph M., Robert Bain. Fifty Southern writers after 1900: A bio-bibliographical sourcebook. Greenwood Press, 1987. ISBN 0313245193.
- Franklin, Benjamin V. Dictionary of American Literary Characters. Facts on File, 1989.
- Goulart, Ron. The Encyclopedia of American Comics. Facts on File, 1990.
- Hart, James D. Concise Oxford Companion to American Literature. Oxford University Press, 1986.
- Hart, James D. Oxford Companion to American Literature. 5th ed., Oxford University Press, 1983.
- Hoffman, Daniel. Harvard Guide to Contemporary American Writing. Harvard University Press, 1979.
- Hurwitz, Leon. Historical Dictionary of Censorship in the United States. Greenwood, 1985.
- Levernier, James, Douglas R. Wilmes. American writers before 1800: A biographical and critical dictionary. Greenwood Press, 1983. ISBN 0313222290.
- Mainiero, Lina. American women writers: A critical reference guide from colonial times to the present. Ungar, c1979–1994. ISBN 0804431515.
- Marple, Alice. Iowa Authors and Their Works. Iowa State Historical Society, 1918.
- Morsberger, Robert Eustis, Stephen O. Lessek, Randall Clark. American screenwriters. Gale Research, 1984. ISBN 0810309173.
- Ousby, Ian. Cambridge Guide to Literature in English. 2nd ed., Cambridge, 1994.
- Oxford Companion to American Literature. 5th ed., Oxford, 1983.
- Paneth, Donald. The Encyclopedia of American Journalism. Facts on File, 1983.
- Perkins, George. Benét's Reader's Encyclopedia of American Literature. HarperCollins, 1991.
- Reader's Encyclopedia of American Literature. Crowell, 1962.
- Riggs, Thomas. Reference guide to American literature. St. James Press, 2000. ISBN 1558624171.
- Salzman, Jack. Cambridge Handbook of American Literature. Cambridge University Press, 1986.
- Showalter, Elaine, Lea Baechler, A. Walton Litz. Modern American women writers. Collier Books; Maxwell Macmillan Canada; Maxwell Macmillan International, 1993. ISBN 0020820259.
- Smith, Jessie Carney, Shirelle Phelps. Notable black American women. Gale Research, 1992–2003. ISBN 0810347490.
- Stedman, Edmund Clarence and Hutchinson, Ellen MacKay (1891). Library of American literature from the earliest settlement to the present time. New York: Webster.
- Unger, Leonard, A. Walton Litz, Molly Weigel. American writers: A collection of literary biographies. Scribner, 1974–. ISBN 0684197855.

==== Australian literature ====
- Cambridge Guide to English Literature.Cambridge, 1983.
- Gunew, Sneja Marina. A Bibliography of Australian multicultural writers. Centre for Studies in Literary Education, Humanities, Deakin University, 1992.
- Oxford Companion to Australian Literature. Oxford, 1984.

==== Canadian literature ====
- Cambridge Guide to English Literature.Cambridge, 1983.
- Mortiz, Albert and Theresa. Oxford Illustrated Literary Guide to Canada. Oxford, 1987.
- Story, Norah. Oxford Companion to Canadian History and Literature. Oxford University Press, 1967.
- Toye, William. The Oxford Companion to Canadian Literature. Oxford University Press, 1983.

==== Caribbean literature ====
- Dance, Daryl Cumber. Fifty Caribbean writers: A bio-bibliographical critical sourcebook. Greenwood Press, 1986. ISBN 0313239398.
- Figueredo, D. H. Encyclopedia of Caribbean literature. Greenwood Press, 2006. ISBN 0313327424.

==== Chinese literature ====
- Baoliang Zhu. 20 shi ji Zhong wen zhu zuo zhe bi ming lu = Twentieth-century Chinese authors and their pen names. Guangxi shi fan da xue chu ban she, 2002. ISBN 7563337199. (Chinese).

==== European literature ====
- Bédé, Jean-Albert and William Edgerton. Columbia Dictionary of Modern European Literature. 2nd ed., Columbia University Press, 1980.
- Giebisch, Hans, Gustav Gugitz. Bio-bibliographisches Literaturlexikon Österreichs: Von den Anfängen bis zur Gegenwart. Brüder Hollinek, 1964.
- Reader's Encyclopedia of Eastern European Literature. HarperCollins, 1993.

===== Albanian literature =====
- Dictionary of Albanian Literature. Greenwood, 1986.
- Hasani, Hasan. Leksikoni i shkrimtarëve shqiptarë 1501–2001. Shtëpia Botuese Faik Konica, 2003. ISBN 995106034X.

===== Austrian literature =====
- Brinker-Gabler, Gisela, Karola Ludwig, Angela Woffen. Lexikon deutschsprachiger Schriftstellerinnen, 1800–1945. Deutscher Taschenbuch Verlag, 1986. ISBN 3423032820. (German).
- Hardin, James N., Donald G. Daviau. Austrian fiction writers, 1875–1913. Gale Research, 1989. ISBN 0810345595.
- Hardin, James N., Donald G. Daviau. Austrian fiction writers after 1914. Gale Research, 1989. ISBN 0810345633.

===== Belgian and Dutch literature =====
- Fredericks, Johann Godefridus and Branden, F. J. van den (1888–1892). Biographisch woordenboek der Noord- en Zuidnederlandsche letterkunde (in Dutch). Amsterdam: Veen.

===== British literature =====
- Cambridge Guide to English Literature.Cambridge, 1983.
- Davis, Gwenn, Beverly A. Joyce. Personal writings by women to 1900: A bibliography of American and British writers. University of Oklahoma Press, 1989. ISBN 0806122064.
- Drabble, Margaret. The Oxford Companion to English Literature. 5th ed., Oxford, 1985.
- Drabble, Margaret and Jenny Stringer. Concise Oxford Companion to English Literature. Oxford, 1987.
- Griffiths, Dennis. Encyclopedia of the British Press, 1440–1991. St. Martin's, 1993.
- Janik, Vicki K., Del Ivan Janik, Emmanuel S. Nelson. Modern British women writers: An A-to-Z guide. Greenwood Press, 2002. ISBN 0313310300.
- Kanner, Barbara. Women in context: Two hundred years of British women autobiographers, a reference guide and reader. G. K. Hall; Prentice Hall International, 1997. ISBN 081617346X.
- Ousby, Ian. Cambridge Guide to Literature in English. 2nd ed., Cambridge, 1994.
- Schlueter, Paul, June Schlueter. An encyclopedia of British women writers. Rutgers University Press, 1998. ISBN 0813525438.
- Scott-Kilvert, Ian, British Council. British writers. Scribner, c1979–c1984. ISBN 0684157985.
- Shattock, Joanne. The Oxford guide to British women writers. Oxford University Press, 1993. ISBN 0192141767.
- Todd, Janet M. British women writers: A critical reference guide. Continuum, 1989. ISBN 0804433348.
- Wynne-Davies, Marion. Prentice Hall Guide to English Literature. Prentice Hall, 1990.

====== Shakespeare ======
- Boyce, Charles. Shakespeare A to Z: The Essential Reference to His Plays, His Poems, His Life and Times, and More. Facts on File 1990.
- Reader's Encyclopedia to Shakespeare. Crowell 1966.
- Stokes, Francis Griffin (1905). Dictionary of the characters and proper names in the works of Shakespeare. London: Harrap.

===== Danish literature =====
- Stecher-Hansen, Marianne. Danish writers from the Reformation to decadence, 1550–1900. Thomson Gale, 2004. ISBN 0787668370.
- Stecher-Hansen, Marianne. Twentieth-century Danish writers. Gale Group, 1999. ISBN 0787631086.

===== Estonian literature =====
- Kruus, Oskar. Eesti kirjarahva leksikon (Estnisches Schriftstellerlexikon.) Eesti Raamat, 1995. ISBN 545002357X.

===== Finnish literature =====
- Suomen kirjailijat -tietokanta. Finnish Literary Society, 2004-. Available online here.

===== French literature =====
- Brosman, Catharine Savage. Nineteenth century French fiction writers: Romanticism and realism, 1800–1860. Gale Research, 1992. ISBN 0810375966.
- Brosman, Catharine Savage. Nineteenth-century French fiction writers: Naturalism and beyond, 1860–1900. Gale Research, 1992. ISBN 0810376008.
- Brosman, Catharine Savage. French novelists, 1900–1930. Gale Research, 1988. ISBN 0810317435.
- Brosman, Catharine Savage. French novelists, 1930–1960. Gale Research, 1988. ISBN 0810345501.
- Brosnan, Catharine Savage. French novelists since 1960. Gale Research, 1989. ISBN 0810345617.
- Cooper, Barbara T. French dramatists, 1789–1914. Gale Research, 1998. ISBN 0787618470.
- Dictionary of Modern French Literature. Greenwood, 1986.
- Niceron, Jean-Pierre (1727–1745). Mémoires pour servir à l'histoire des hommes illustres dans la république des lettres (in French). Paris: Briasson.
- Oxford Companion to French Literature. Oxford University Press, 1959.

===== German literature =====
- Brinker-Gabler, Gisela, Karola Ludwig, Angela Woffen. Lexikon deutschsprachiger Schriftstellerinnen, 1800–1945. Deutscher Taschenbuch Verlag, 1986. ISBN 3423032820. (German).
- Brümmer, Franz (1913). Lexikon der deutschen Dichter und Prosaisten vom Beginn der 19. Jahrhunderts bis zur Gegenwart (in German). Aufl. Leipzig: Reclam.
- Goedeke, Karl (1884–1966). Grundriss zur Geschichte der deutschen Dichtung aus den Quellen (in German). Aufl. Dresden: Ehlermann.
- Heukenkamp, Ursula, Peter Geist. Deutschsprachige Lyriker des 20. Jahrhunderts. E. Schmidt, 2007. ISBN 9783503079995.
- Jessen, Jens Christian. Bibliographie der Autobiographien. K. G. Saur, 1987–1996. ISBN 3598106734. (German).
- Keith-Smith, Brian. An encyclopedia of German women writers, 1900–1933: Biographies and bibliographies with exemplary readings. E. Mellen Press, c1997–c1998. ISBN 077348597X.
- Kosch, Wilhelm, Bruno Berger, Heinz Rupp, Carl Ludwig Lang, Hubert Herkommer. Deutsches Literatur-Lexikon: Biograph.-bibliograph. Handbuch. Francke, 1968–. ISBN 9783907820001.
- Kürschners deutscher Literatur-Kalendar (in German). Berlin: W. de Gruyter. 1879.
- Oxford Companion to German Literature. Oxford University Press, 2nd ed., 1986.

====== German Jewish literature ======
- Heuer, Renate, Andrea Boelke-Fabian, Abdelhaq El Mesmoudi. Lexikon deutsch-jüdischer Autoren. Saur,|De Gruyter, 1992–2012. ISBN 9783598226809.

===== Hungarian literature =====
- Szinnyei, József. Magyar írók: Élete és munkái a Magyar tudományos akadémia megbizásából irta Szinnyei József . . . Hornyanszky, 1891–1914. Available online here and here.
- Tezla, Albert. Hungarian authors: A bibliographical handbook. Belknap Press of Harvard University Press, 1970. ISBN 0674426509.

===== Irish literature =====
- Brady, Anne, Brian Talbot Cleeve. A biographical dictionary of Irish writers. Lilliput Press, 1985. ISBN 0946640114.
- Brown, Stephen James (1919). Ireland in fiction. Dublin, London: Maunsel.
- Dictionary of Irish Literature. Greenwood, 1979.
- O'Donoghue, David James (1912). The poets of Ireland. Dublin: Figgis.

===== Iberian peninsular literature =====
- Dictionary of the Literature of the Iberian Peninsula. Greenwood, 1993.

====== Portuguese literature ======
- Rector, Monica, Fred M. Clark. Portuguese writers. Gale Group, 2004. ISBN 0787668249.

====== Spanish literature ======
- Altisent, Martha Eulalia, Cristina Martínez-Carazo. Twentieth-century Spanish fiction writers. Thomson Gale, 2006. ISBN 9780787681401.
- Dictionary of Spanish Literature. Greenwood, 1956.
- Durán López, Fernando. Catálogo comentado de la autobiografía española, siglos XVIII y XIX. Ollero and Ramos, 1997. ISBN 8478950648.
- Ferreras, Juan Ignacio. Catálogo de novelas y novelistas españoles del siglo XIX. Cátedra, 1979. ISBN 8437601827.
- Oxford Companion to Spanish Literature. Oxford University Press, 1978.

===== Italian literature =====
- Dictionary of Italian Literature. Greenwood, 1979.
- Dictionary of the Literature of the Iberian Peninsula. Greenwood, 1993.
- Encyclopedia of Italian Literary Studies: A-J. Taylor & Francis. 2007. ISBN 978-1-57958-390-3.
- Ferrari, Luigi. Onomasticon: Repertorio biobibliografico degli scrittori italiani dal 1501 al 1850. University of Hoepli, 1947.

===== Norwegian literature =====
- Thresher, Tanya. Twentieth-century Norwegian writers. Thomson/Gale, 2004. ISBN 0787668346.

===== Romanian literature =====
- Sasu, Aurel. Dictionarul biografic al literaturii române: DBLR. Paralela 45, 2006. ISBN 9789736977596.

===== Russian literature =====
- Dictionary of Russian Literature. Greenwood, 1956.
- Harkins, William. Dictionary of Russian Literature. Philosophical Library, 1956.
- Kasack, Wolfgang. Dictionary of Russian Literature Since 1917. Columbia University Press, 1988.
- Modern Encyclopedia of Russian and Soviet Literatures. Academic International Press, 1977-.
- Stevanovic, Bosiljka, Vladimir Wertsman, Alexander Sumerkin. Free voices in Russian literature, 1950s-1980s: A bio-bibliographical guide. Russica Publishers, 1987. ISBN 0898300908.
- Terras, Victor. Handbook of Russian Literature. Yale University Press, 1985.
- Vengerov, Semen Afanas'evich (1900–1917). Istochniki slovakia russkikh pisatelei (in Russian). Saint Petersburg: Tip. Imp. Akademia Nauk.

===== Scandinavian literature =====
- Dictionary of Scandinavian Literature. Greenwood, 1990.
- The History of Nordic Women's Literature, online English version of Aurelius, Eva Haettner; Mai, Anne-Marie (1993). Nordisk kvindelitteraturhistorie. Rosinante/Munksgård. ISBN 978-87-16-10311-6.

====== Danish literature ======
- Eslew, Thomas Hansen (1843–1853). Almindeligt Fofatter-Lexicon for Kongeriget Danmark med tillhørende Bilande, fra 1814 til 1840 (in Danish). Copenhagen: Forlagsforeningens Forlag.

====== Norwegian literature ======
- Halvorsen, Jens Braage (1905). Norsk forfatter-lexikon, 1814–1880 (in Norwegian). Kristiana: Norske Forlagsforening.

====== Swedish literature ======
- Åhlén, Bengt, Paul Harnesk. Svenskt författarlexikon; biobibliografisk handbok till Sveriges moderna litteratur. Rabén and Sjögren, [n.d.]

===== Slovak literature =====
- Mikula, Valér. Slovník slovenských spisovatelov. Kalligram, 2005. ISBN 8071498017.

===== Swiss literature =====
- Brinker-Gabler, Gisela, Karola Ludwig, Angela Woffen. Lexikon deutschsprachiger Schriftstellerinnen, 1800–1945. Deutscher Taschenbuch Verlag, 1986. ISBN 3423032820. (German).

===== Welsh literature =====
- Oxford Companion to the Literature of Wales. Oxford, 1986.

==== Iranian literature ====
- Storey, C. A. Persian literature: A bio-bibliographical survey. Luzac, 1927–.

==== Latin American literature ====
- Arellano, Jorge Eduardo. Literatura centroamericana: Diccionario de autores contemporáneos; Fuentes para su estudio. Fundación Vida, 2003. ISBN 9992453125.
- Foster, David William. Handbook of Latin American Literature. 2nd ed., Garland, 1992.

===== Brazilian literature =====
- Dictionary of Brazilian Literature. Greenwood, 1988.

===== Cuban literature =====
- Instituto de Literatura y Lingüística (Academia de Ciencias de Cuba). Diccionario de la literatura cubana. Editorial Letras Cubanas, 1980–1984.
- Martinez, Julio A. Dictionary of Twentieth-Century Cuban Literature. Greenwood, 1990.

===== Ecuadorian literature =====
- Neto, Paulo de Carvalho. Diccionario del folklore ecuatoriano. Editorial Casa de la Cultura Ecuatoriana, 2001. ISBN 9789978622018.

===== Guyanese literature =====
- National History & Arts Council. Dictionary of Guyanese folklore. National History & Arts Council, 1975.

===== Mexican literature =====
- Dictionary of Mexican Literature. Greenwood, 1992.

===== Uruguayan literature =====
- Oreggioni, Alberto F., Ediciones de la Banda Oriental. Nuevo diccionario de literatura uruguaya, 2001. A. Oreggioni; Ediciones de la Banda Oriental, [2001]. ISBN 9974102170.

===== Venezuelan literature =====
- Dugarte, Rafael Angel Rivas, Gladys García Riera, Francisco Javier Pérez. Quiénes escriben en Venezuela: Diccionario de escritores venezolanos; Siglos XVIII a XXI. Caracas [Venezuela], 2006.

==== Middle Eastern literature ====
- Al-Mallah, Majd Yaser, Coeli Fitzpatrick. Twentieth-century Arab writers. Gale Cengage Learning, 2009. ISBN 9780787681647.

===== Turkish literature =====
- Işık, İhsan. Encyclopedia of Turkish authors: People of literature, culture, and science. Elvan, 2005. ISBN 975933108X.

==== Oriental literature ====
- Prošek, Jaroslav. Dictionary of Oriental Literatures. Basic Books, 1975.

===== Japanese literature =====
- Fairbanks, Carol. Japanese women fiction writers: Their culture and society, 1890s to 1990s: English language sources. Scarecrow Press, 2002. ISBN 0810840863.
- Gessel, Van C. Japanese fiction writers, 1868–1945. Gale Research, 1997. ISBN 0787610682.
- Lewell, John. Modern Japanese novelists: A biographical dictionary. Kodansha International, 1993. ISBN 4770016492.
- Miner, Earl. Princeton Companion to Classical Japanese Literature. Princeton University Press, 1985.
- Odagiri, Susumu. Nihon kindai bungaku daijiten. Nihon Kindai Bungakukan, Tokyo [1977-1978].

===== South Asian literature =====
- Sanga, Jaina C. South Asian novelists in English: An A-to-Z guide. Greenwood Press, 2003. ISBN 0313318859.

====== Indian literature ======
- Encyclopedia of Indian Literature. Sahitya Akademi, 1987-.

==== New Zealand literature ====
- Cambridge Guide to English Literature.Cambridge, 1983.

=== Authors ===
- Allibone, Samuel Austin (1858). Critical dictionary of English literature and British and American authors. Philadelphia: Lippincott.
- Behn, Wolfgang. Concise biographical companion to index Islamicus: An international who's who in Islamic studies from its beginnings down to the twentieth century: Bio-bibliographical supplement to index Islamicus, 1665–1980. Brill, 2004–2006. ISBN 9004141170.
- Combs, Richard E., Nancy R. Owen. Authors: Critical and biographical references. Scarecrow Press, 1993. ISBN 0810826798.
- Contemporary authors online. Gale Research, 1995-. Available online here.
- Gubernatis, Angelo de (1905). Dictionnaire international des ecrivains du monde latin (in Latin). Rome: Auteur.
- Kunitz, Stanley, Howard Haycraft. Twentieth century authors. H. W. Wilson, 1942.

==== Chinese authors ====
- Moran, Thomas. Chinese fiction writers, 1900–1949. Thomson Gale, 2007. ISBN 0787681466.

==== Icelandic authors ====
- Stevens, Patrick J. Icelandic writers. Thomson Gale, 2004. ISBN 0787668303.

==== Japanese writers ====
- Carter, Steven D. Medieval Japanese writers. Gale Research, 1999. ISBN 0787630977.
- Gessel, Van C. Japanese fiction writers since World War II. Gale Research, 1997. ISBN 0787610712.

==== Norwegian authors ====
- Halvorsen, Jens Braage (1905). Norsk forfatter-lexikon, 1814–1880 (in Norwegian). Kristiana: Norske Forlagsforening.

==== Turkish authors ====
- Mitler, Louis. Ottoman Turkish writers: A bibliographical dictionary of significant figures in pre-Republican Turkish literature. P. Lang, 1988. ISBN 0820406333.

=== Biography and autobiography ===
- Jessen, Jens Christian. Bibliographie der Autobiographien. K. G. Saur, 1987–1996. ISBN 3598106734. (German).
- Kanner, Barbara. Women in context: Two hundred years of British women autobiographers, a reference guide and reader. G. K. Hall; Prentice Hall International, 1997. ISBN 081617346X.
- Matthews, William. British autobiographies: An annotated bibliography of British autobiographies published or written before 1951. University of California Press, 1955.
- Wynar, Bohdan S. ARBA guide to biographical dictionaries. Libraries Unlimited, 1986. ISBN 0872874923.

=== Censorship ===
- Green, Jonathon. The Encyclopedia of Censorship. Facts on File, 1990.
- Haight, Anne Lyon. Banned Books, 387 B.C. to 1978 A.D.. 4th ed., Bowker, 1978.
- Harer, John B. Intellectual Freedom: A Reference Handbook. ABC-Clio, 1992.
- Hurwitz, Leon. Historical Dictionary of Censorship in the United States. Greenwood, 1985.

=== Children's literature ===
- Carpenter, Humphrey & Mari Prichard. The Oxford Companion to Children's Literature. Oxford University Press, 1984.
- Carruth, Gorton. Young Reader's Companion. Bowker, 1993.
- Gale Research, Thomson Gale. Something about the author. Gale Research, 1971–. ISSN 0276-816X.
- La Beau, Dennis, Adele Sarkissian, Joyce Nakamura. Children's authors and illustrators: An index to biographical dictionaries. Gale Research, 1976–. ISSN 1082-7390.
- Pendergast, Sara, Tom Pendergast, Margaret Mahy. St. James guide to children's writers. St. James Press, 1999. ISBN 1558623698.
- Stott, Jon C. Children's Literature from A to Z: A Guide for Parents and Teachers. McGraw-Hill, 1984.
- Wyatt, Flora R., Margaret Coggins, Jane Hunter Imber. Popular nonfiction authors for children: A biographical and thematic guide. Libraries Unlimited, 1998. ISBN 1563084082.

=== Classical literature ===
- Howatson, M. C. The Oxford Companion to Classical Literature. 2nd ed., Oxford, 1989.

=== Drama ===
- Hochman, Stanley. McGraw-Hill Encyclopedia of World Drama: An International Reference Work. 2nd ed., McGraw-Hill, 1984.
- Shipley, Joseph. Crown Guide to the World's Great Plays. Rev. ed., Crown, 1984.

=== Epics and romances ===
- British Museum. Dept. of Manuscripts (1883–1910). Catalogue of romances in the Dept. of Manuscripts in the British Museum. London: Trustees.
- Guerber, Helene Adeline (1919). Book of the epic. London: Harrap.
- Spence, Lewis (1913). Dictionary of medieval romance and romance writers. New York: Dutton.

=== Gothic ===
- Thomson, Douglass H., Jack G. Voller, Frederick S. Frank. Gothic writers: A critical and bibliographical guide. Greenwood Press, 2002. ISBN 0313305005.

=== Historical fiction ===
- Vasudevan, Aruna, Lesley Henderson. Twentieth-century romance and historical writers. St. James Press, 1994. ISBN 1558621806.

=== Historiography ===
- Woolf, D. R., Kathryn M. Brammall, Greg Bak. A global encyclopedia of historical writing. Garland, 1998. ISBN 0815315147.

=== Journalism ===
- Applegate, Edd. Literary journalism: A biographical dictionary of writers and editors. Greenwood Press, 1996. ISBN 0313299498.
- Connors, Tracy Daniel. Longman dictionary of mass media and communication. Longman, 1982. ISBN 058228337X.
- Drost, Harry. The world's news media: A comprehensive reference guide. Longman Group, 1991. ISBN 0582085543.
- Griffiths, Dennis. The encyclopedia of the British press, 1422–1992. St. Martin's Press, 1992. ISBN 0312086334.
- Johnston, Donald H. Encyclopedia of international media and communications. Academic Press, 2003. ISBN 0123876702.
- Quick, Amanda C. World press encyclopedia: A survey of press systems worldwide. Gale, 2003. ISBN 0787655821.
- Taft, William H. Encyclopedia of twentieth-century journalists. Garland, 1986. ISBN 0824089618.
- Weiner, Richard. Webster's New World dictionary of media and communications. Macmillan, 1996. ISBN 0028606116.

==== American journalism ====
- Ashley, Perry J. American newspaper journalists, 1873–1900. Gale Research, 1983. ISBN 0810311453.
- Ashley, Perry J. American newspaper publishers, 1950–1990. Gale Research, 1993. ISBN 0810353865.
- Krul, Arthur J. American literary journalists, 1945–1995. Gale Research, 1997. ISBN 0787611190.
- McKerns, Joseph P. Biographical dictionary of American journalism. Greenwood Press, 1989. ISBN 0313238189.
- Paneth, Donald. The encyclopedia of American journalism. Facts on File, Inc., 1983. ISBN 0871964279.
- Riley, Sam G. American magazine journalists, 1741–1850. Gale Research, 1988. ISBN 081034551X.
- Riley, Sam. G. Biographical dictionary of American newspaper columnists. Greenwood Press, 1995. ISBN 0313291926.
- Vaughn, Stephen L. Encyclopedia of American journalism. Routledge, 2008. ISBN 0415969506.
- Wynar, Lubomyr Roman, Anna T. Wynar. Encyclopedic directory of ethnic newspapers and periodicals in the United States. Libraries Unlimited, 1976. ISBN 0872871541.
- Wynar, Lubomyr Roman. Guide to the American ethnic press: Slavic and East European newspapers and periodicals. Center for the Study of Ethnic Publications, School of Library Science, Kent State University, 1986.

=== Literary characters and plots ===
- Amos, William. The Originals: An A-Z of Fiction's Real-Life Characters. Little, Brown, 1985.
- Franklin, Benjamin V. Dictionary of American Literary Characters. Facts on File, 1989.
- Freeman, William. Dictionary of Fictional Characters. Rev. ed., The Writer, 1992.
- Harris, Laurie. Characters in 20th Century Literature. Gale, 1990.
- Howes, Kelly King. Characters in 19th Century Literature. Gale, 1992.
- Magill, Frank N. Cyclopedia of Literary Characters. Salem Press, 1963.
- Magill, Frank N. Cyclopedia of Literary Characters II. Salem Press, 1990.
- Magill, Frank N. Masterplots. Rev. ed., Salem Press, 1976.
- Magill, Frank N. Masterplots II. Salem Press, 1986–90.
- Pringle, David. Imaginary People: A Who's Who of Modern Fictional Characters. World Almanac, 1987.

=== Literary criticism ===
- Coyle, Martin. Encyclopedia of Literature and Criticism. Gale, 1991.
- Harris, Wendell V. Dictionary of Concepts in Literary Criticism and Theory. Greenwood, 1992.

=== Magazines ===
- Riley, Sam G. Magazines of the American South. Greenwood Press, 1986. ISBN 0313243379.
- Wynar, Lubomyr Roman, Anna T. Wynar. Encyclopedic directory of ethnic newspapers and periodicals in the United States. Libraries Unlimited, 1976. ISBN 0872871541.
- Wynar, Lubomyr Roman. Guide to the American ethnic press: Slavic and East European newspapers and periodicals. Center for the Study of Ethnic Publications, School of Library Science, Kent State University, 1986.

=== Novels ===
- Contemporary novelists. St. James Press; St. Martin's Press, 1972–. ISSN 1531-2232.

=== Poetry ===
- Heukenkamp, Ursula, Peter Geist. Deutschsprachige Lyriker des 20. Jahrhunderts. E. Schmidt, 2007. ISBN 9783503079995.
- O'Donoughue, D. J. The poets of Ireland: A biographical and bibliographical dictionary of Irish writers of English verse. Hodges, Figgis and Company, 1912.
- Preminger, Alex and T. V. F. Brogan. The New Princeton Encyclopedia of Poetry and Poetics. 3rd ed., Princeton University Press, 1993.
- Stewart, William. British and Irish poets: a biographical dictionary, 449-2006. McFarland, 2007. ISBN 9780786428915.

=== Printing and Publishing ===
- Cleeton, Glen U.; Pitkin, Charles W.; Cornwell, Raymond L. (September 1, 2006). General Printing: An Illustrated Guide to Letterpress Printing (Paperback) (Reissue ed.). Saratoga, California: General printing, Liber Apertus Press. pp. 224 pages. ISBN 978-0-9785881-4-4.
- Duff, E. Gordon (1905). Century of the English Book Trade ... 1457–1557. London: Bibliographical Society.
- Eckersley, Richard; Angstadt, Richard; Ellertson, Charles M.; Hende, Richard (April 15, 2008). Glossary of Typesetting Terms (Chicago Guides to Writing, Editing, and Publishing) (2nd ed.). University of Chicago Press, Amazon Digital Services, Inc. ISBN 9780226183732.
- Feather, John. Dictionary of Book History. Oxford University Press, 1987.
- Fumagalli, Giuseppe (1905). Lexicon typographicum Italiae (in Italian). Florence: Olschki.
- Glaister, Geoffrey. Glaister's Glossary of the Book. 2nd ed., University of California Press, 1980.
- Kurian, George Thomas. Encyclopedia of Publishing and the Book Arts. Holt, 1994.
- Lepreux, Georges (1909–1914). Gallia typographica (in French). Paris: Champion.
- McKerrow, R. B. (1910). Dictionary of Printers and Booksellers in England, Scotland, and Ireland and of Foreign Printers of English Books, 1557–1640. London: Bibliographical Society.
- Plomer, H. R. (1907). Dictionary of the Printers and Booksellers Who Were at Work in England, Scotland and Ireland, from 1641 to 1667. London: Bibliographical Society.
- Ringwalt, John Luther (1871). American Encyclopaedia of Printing. Menamin & Ringwalt.

=== Romance fiction ===
- Vasudevan, Aruna, Lesley Henderson. Twentieth-century romance and historical writers. St. James Press, 1994. ISBN 1558621806.

=== Science fiction ===
- Clute, John and Peter Nicholls. Encyclopedia of Science Fiction. St. Martin's, 1993.
- Gunn, James. The New Encyclopedia of Science Fiction. Viking-Penguin, 1988.

=== Spy fiction ===
- McCormick, Donald, Katy Fletcher. Spy fiction: A connoisseur's guide. Facts on File, 1990. ISBN 0816020981.

=== 20th century literature ===
- Harris, Laurie. Characters in 20th Century Literature. Gale, 1990.
- Klein, Leonard S. Encyclopedia of World Literature in the 20th Century. 2nd ed., Continuum Publishing Group, 1981–83.
- Martinez, Julio A. Dictionary of Twentieth-Century Cuban Literature. Greenwood, 1990.
- Seymour-Smith, Martin. New Guide to Modern World Literature. HarperCollins, 1985.
- Vasudevan, Aruna, Lesley Henderson. Twentieth-century romance and historical writers. St. James Press, 1994. ISBN 1558621806.
- Baoliang Zhu. 20 shi ji Zhong wen zhu zuo zhe bi ming lu = Twentieth-century Chinese authors and their pen names. Guangxi shi fan da xue chu ban she, 2002. ISBN 7563337199. (Chinese).

=== Women's literature ===
- Banks, Olive. The biographical dictionary of British feminists. New York University Press, 1985–1990. ISBN 0814710786.
- Blain, Virginia. Feminist Companion to Literature in English: Women Writers from the Middle Ages to the Present. Yale University Press, 1990.
- Boynton, Victoria, Jo Malin, Emmanuel S. Nelson. Encyclopedia of women's autobiography. Greenwood Press, 2005. ISBN 0313327378.
- Buck, Claire. The Bloomsbury Guide to Women's Literature. Prentice Hall, 1992.
- Davis, Gwenn, Beverly A. Joyce. Personal writings by women to 1900: A bibliography of American and British writers. University of Oklahoma Press, 1989. ISBN 0806122064.
- Jensen, Elisabeth Møller (2000). Nordisk kvinnolitteraturhistoria: Liv och verk. Wiken. ISBN 978-91-7119-263-9. Searchable online English-language version History of Nordic Women's Literature
- Kanner, Barbara. Women in context: Two hundred years of British women autobiographers, a reference guide and reader. G. K. Hall; Prentice Hall International, 1997. ISBN 081617346X.
- Keith-Smith, Brian. An encyclopedia of German women writers, 1900–1933: Biographies and bibliographies with exemplary readings. E. Mellen Press, c1997–c1998. ISBN 077348597X.
- Miller, Jane Eldridge. Who's who in contemporary women's writing. Routledge, 2002. ISBN 0415159814.
- Smith, Jessie Carney, Shirelle Phelps. Notable black American women. Gale Research, 1992–2003. ISBN 0810347490.
- Todd, Janet M. A dictionary of British and American women writers, 1660–1800. Rowman and Allanheld, 1985. ISBN 0847671259.

== Proverbs ==
- Apperson, George Latimer (1929). English proverbs and proverbial phrases. London: Dent.
