= Ørum Church =

Ørum Church may refer to:

- Ørum Church (Norddjurs Municipality)
- Ørum Church (Skive Municipality)

== See also ==
- Ørum (disambiguation)
