= Merete Ries =

Danish publisher and editor (1938–2018)

- Born: Merete Jul Ries; 11 October 1938; Copenhagen, Denmark
- Died: 25 May 2018 (aged 79); Denmark
- Education: University of Copenhagen
- Occupations: Editor; Publisher
- Years active: 1966–2014
- Spouses: Paul R. (m. 1963–1967) Jørgen Jakobsen (m. 1973)
- Children: 1

Merete Jul Ries (11 October 1938 – 25 May 2018) was a Danish publisher and editor. She entered the publishing literature when she joined the Gyldendal publishing house in 1966 and served as its publishing editor from 1968 until she was made redundant in 1980. Ries was an editor at the Tiderne Skifter publishing house between 1981 and 1982 and then established the Rosinante publishing house in 1982. She established a Danish news magazine called OMverden in 1991 and was an editor from 1993 to 2001, working on The History of Nordic Women's Literature and Dansk kvindebiografisk leksikon.

== Biography ==
She was born Merete Jul Ries in Copenhagen on 11 October 1938. She is the daughter of the haulage driver Martin Jul Jensen and the nurse Inger Else Fenneberg. Ries was brought up by her mother. In 1957, she enrolled at the Aurehøj Gymnasium and then studied Danish at the University of Copenhagen. She interrupted her education when she relocated to England and got married. She went back to Denmark with her young child in 1966, and found employment working as a substitute teacher at a primary school. That same year, Ries came into contact with the author and childhood friend Toni Liversage, and began her career in the publishing industry by joining the Gyldendal publishing house. Two years later, she became Gyldenadal's publishing editor. Ries earned the reputation of a "down-to-earth and committed and to sometimes loudspeaker employee".

In 1972, she entered into the world of women's literature and was instrumental in getting the first neo-feminist novel Hvad tænkte egentlig Arendse written by Jette Drewsen published. Ries was sacked from Gyldenadal in 1980 as part of an austerity measure at the publishing house with 41 authors writing an open letter in protest of the decision. From 1981 to 1982, she worked at the publishing house Tiderne Skifter as an editor. Ries established the Rosinante publishing house at her home in Charlottenlund as a private limited company in 1982. Soon several publications contributed to the positive reputation of the publishing house, and it became internationally known when the Peter Høeg book Miss Smilla's Feeling for Snow was published in 1992. She also made the people of Denmark become familiar with the authors Jens Christian Grøndahl, Arundhati Roy and Jung Chang. In 1987, Ries won the PH Prize, and also translated the works of authors such as Nelson Mandela, Virginia Wolff, Herbert Marcuse and Doris Lessing.

Ries became editor-in-chief of the publishing publisher Forlaget Munksgaard in collaboration with her own publishing house Rosinante & Co in 1989. In 1991, she set up the Danish news magazine OMverden focused on politics. Ries edited the five-volume series The History of Nordic Women's Literature from 1993 to 1998, and Dansk kvindebiografisk leksikon in 2000 and 2001. She served as chair of the Ministry of Culture's literature committee from 1993 to 1994, in which she oversaw the establishment of The Literature Council three years later. In 1998, Ries re-purchased the Rosinante & Co publishing house from Munksgaard, where she became Munksgaard's literary director, and then merged it into Gyldendal in the same year. She served as director Rosinante Forlag A / S with Gyldendal as co-owner between 1999 and 2002 and as the sole owner from 2000. Between 2003 and 2014, Ries operated her own publishing house which was called Ries Forlag that published a few books per year.

== Personal life ==
She was first married to the lecturer Paul R. from 1963 to 1967. Ries had her only child during the marriage. In 1973, she married again, to the department head Jørgen Jakobsen.

Ries died on the morning of 25 May 2018.

== Analysis ==
Jakob Malling Lambert described Ries as having a "special ability to find the right word, which manifested itself in a bubbly humor and a sharp tongue. And then she rarely had a nose for literature and a sense of language." Michael Hertz in Ries' entry in the Dansk kvindebiografisk leksikon writes that she did not "make populism her religion" and she supported "the elite culture" and allowed the market to be left to "entertainment literature to others who are more skilled than she is in that field.".
