= Lene Koch =

Danish feminist academic (born 1947)

Lene Koch (born 1947) is a Danish academic researcher, feminist and historian. She was one of the driving forces behind the establishment of the Centre for Women's Research at the University of Copenhagen which she headed from 1981 to 1985. In the late 1980s, she began to specialize in eugenics, conducting a study into test tube fertilization in Denmark. In 1988, she succeeded Nynne Koch as head of Kvinfo, the Danish Centre for Research on Women and Gender. From 1990, she returned to her eugenics research, heading Copenhagen University's Health Services Research Department until she became professor emeritus.

== Early life, education and family ==
Born in Virum on 31 July 1947, Lene Koch is the daughter of the library inspector Ole Carl Valdemar Koch (1920–90) and his wife Anna Marie née Ludvigsen (1920–84). In 1972 she gave birth to Nanna ten months later left the father who subsequently cared for her daughter. In 1979 she married the high court judge Henrik Kristian Zahle (born 1943) with whom she gave birth to a second child, Maria.

Raised in an academic, Grundtvig-inspired home, Koch attended N. Zahle's School, where she was specially interested in physics and chemistry. In 1967, she matriculated from Øregård Gymnasium. After first studying classics at the University of Copenhagen, in 1978 she earned a master's degree in English and history. While studying, in the early 1970s she was one of the leading figures in the Students' Council, where she first became interested in women's research.

== Career ==
One of the driving forces behind the University of Copenhagen's increasing interest in women's studies, from 1981 to 1985 she managed the institution's newly established Centre for Women's Research (Center for Kvindeforskning). There she took a special interest in American feminist historians, including Linda Gordon and Carroll Smith-Rosenberg, which she covered in her 1984 anthology Hendes egen verden (published in English as A heritage of her own: Woman's body, woman's right). In 1986, she received a grant from the Management Group for Women's Research (Styringsgruppen for Kvindeforskning) which enabled her to research motherhood in Denmark, examining in particular the artificial insemination of infertile women.

In 1988, Lene Koch succeeded Nynne Koch as head of the women and gender research organization, Kvinfo, where she relaunched the journal Forum for kvindeforskning (Forum for Women's Research), addressing new trends in women's research. In 1990, she was engaged as a lecturer in health research at Copenhagen University's Panum Institute. There she has been a major contributor to research on eugenics, hereditary biology and fetal diagnostics, publishing widely on these and related subjects. She headed Copenhagen University's Health Services Research Department until her retirement when she became professor emeritus.
