= Svenskt kvinnobiografiskt lexikon =

Biographical dictionary of Swedish women (2018)

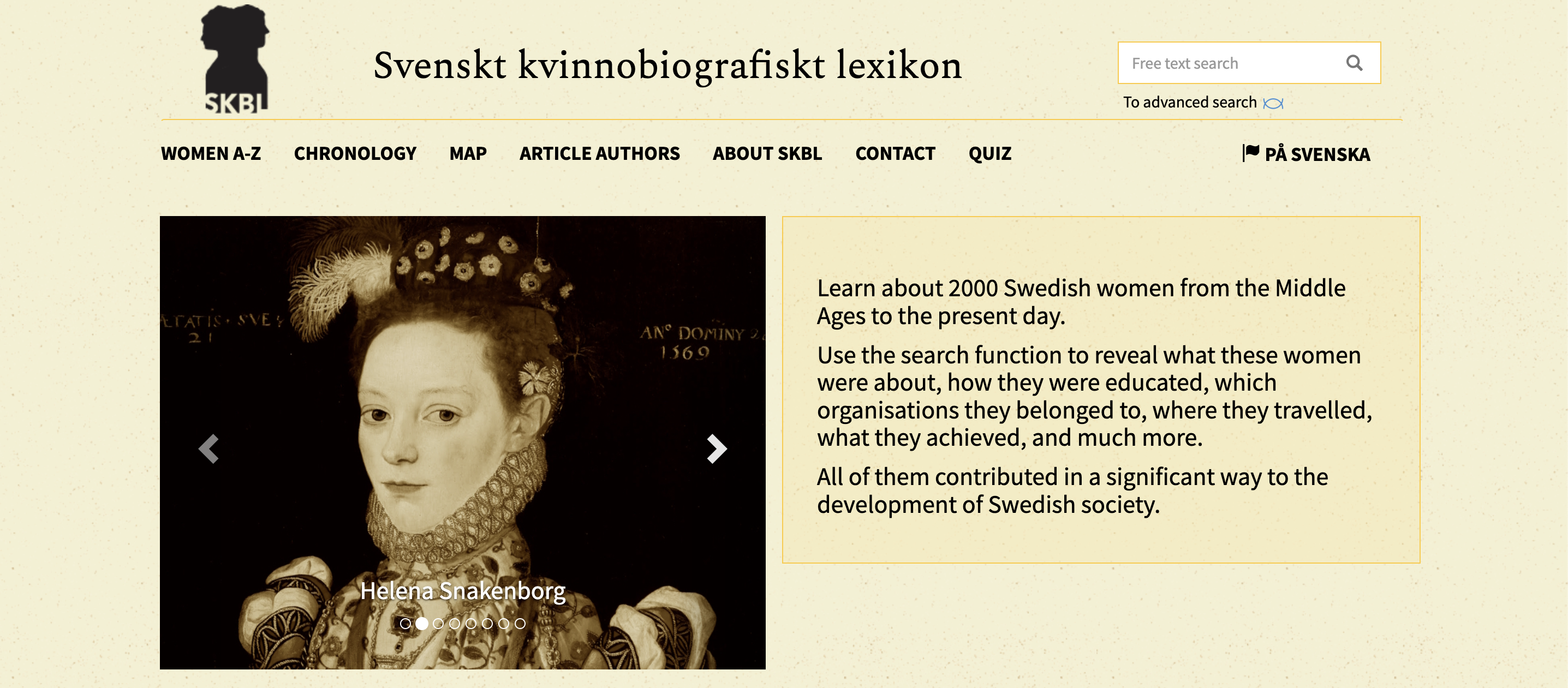
- Front page of the English edition, featuring the entry for Helena Snakenborg
- Editor: Lisbeth Larsson; Maria Sjöberg
- Translator: Alexia Grosjean
- Language: Swedish and English
- Genre: Women's history
- Publication date: 2018
- Publication place: Sweden
- Media type: Digital biographical dictionary
- ISBN: 978-91-639-7594-3
- Website: skbl.se/en

Svenskt kvinnobiografiskt lexikon (SKBL), known in English as Biographical Dictionary of Swedish Women, is a Swedish biographical dictionary of Swedish women.

== History ==
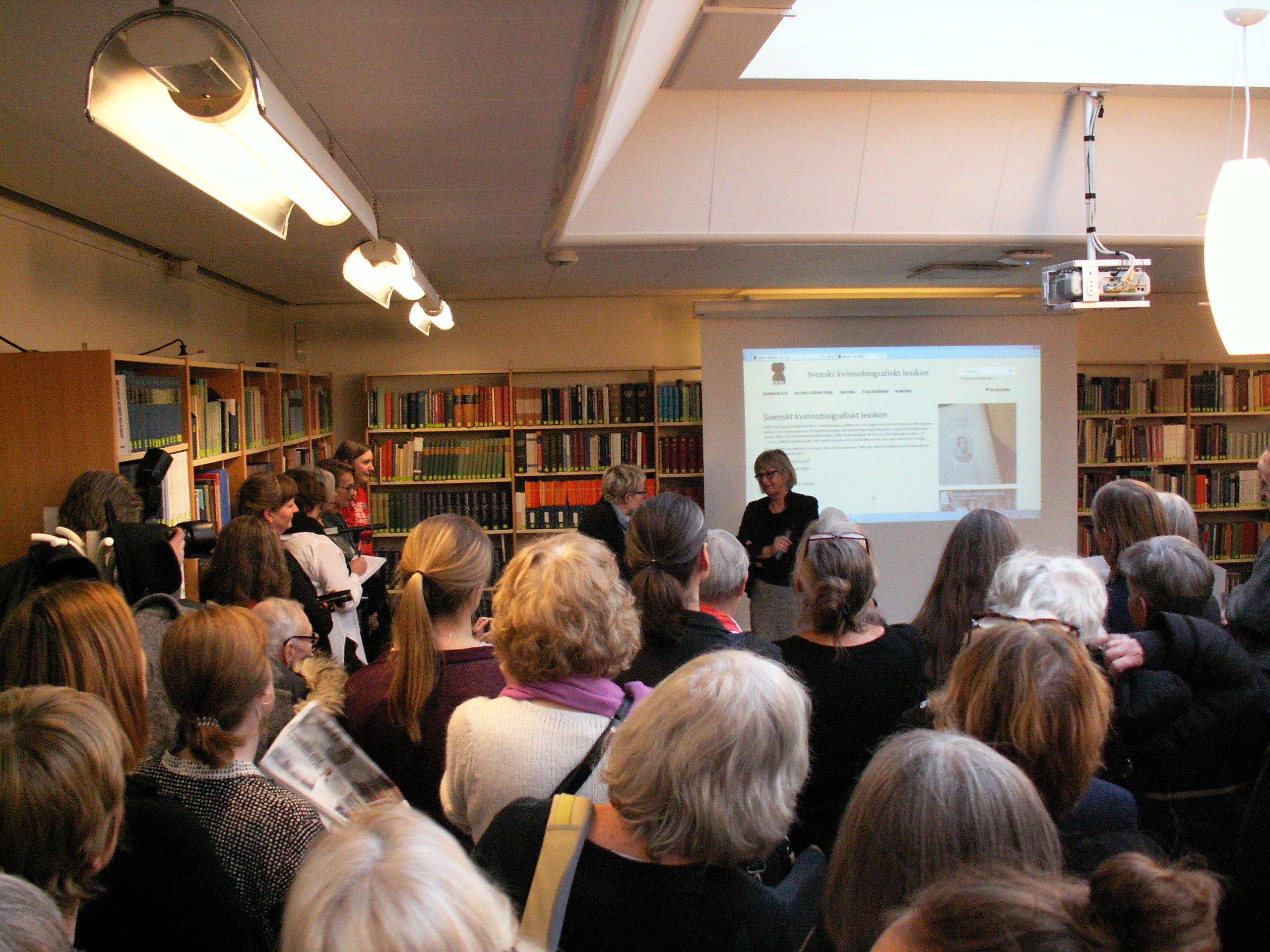
First presentation of the dictionary, on International Women's Day 2018

It was started in 2018 when 1,000 articles about Swedish women were published in Swedish and English and a further 1,000 articles were published in 2020. This activity has been financed by Bank of Sweden Tercentenary Foundation.

From 2010 Lisbeth Larsson (1949–2021), a professor of literary studies, tried to create a more general dictionary with a focus on women to give a fairer picture of history (together with Inger Eriksson, operations manager at KvinnSam). The original plan was to publish a book but it was later decided to compile a database which could be accessed as a web-based dictionary.

== Content ==
SKBL is produced by the University of Gothenburg and the articles are written by experts and researchers. The dictionary contains biographies of women who, across several centuries and in many different ways, have contributed to society's development, both within Sweden and beyond.

The entries, based on a mix of existing and brand-new research, were mainly selected with an emphasis on societal significance rather than personal fame. The selection includes female pioneers and women who fought for gender equality as well as those of historical significance. Finnish women are also included for the pre-1809 era.

The text of the SKBL is licensed under a Creative Commons attribution license.

== See also ==
- Svenskt biografiskt lexikon
