= Maria Sjöberg =

Swedish historian (born 1960)

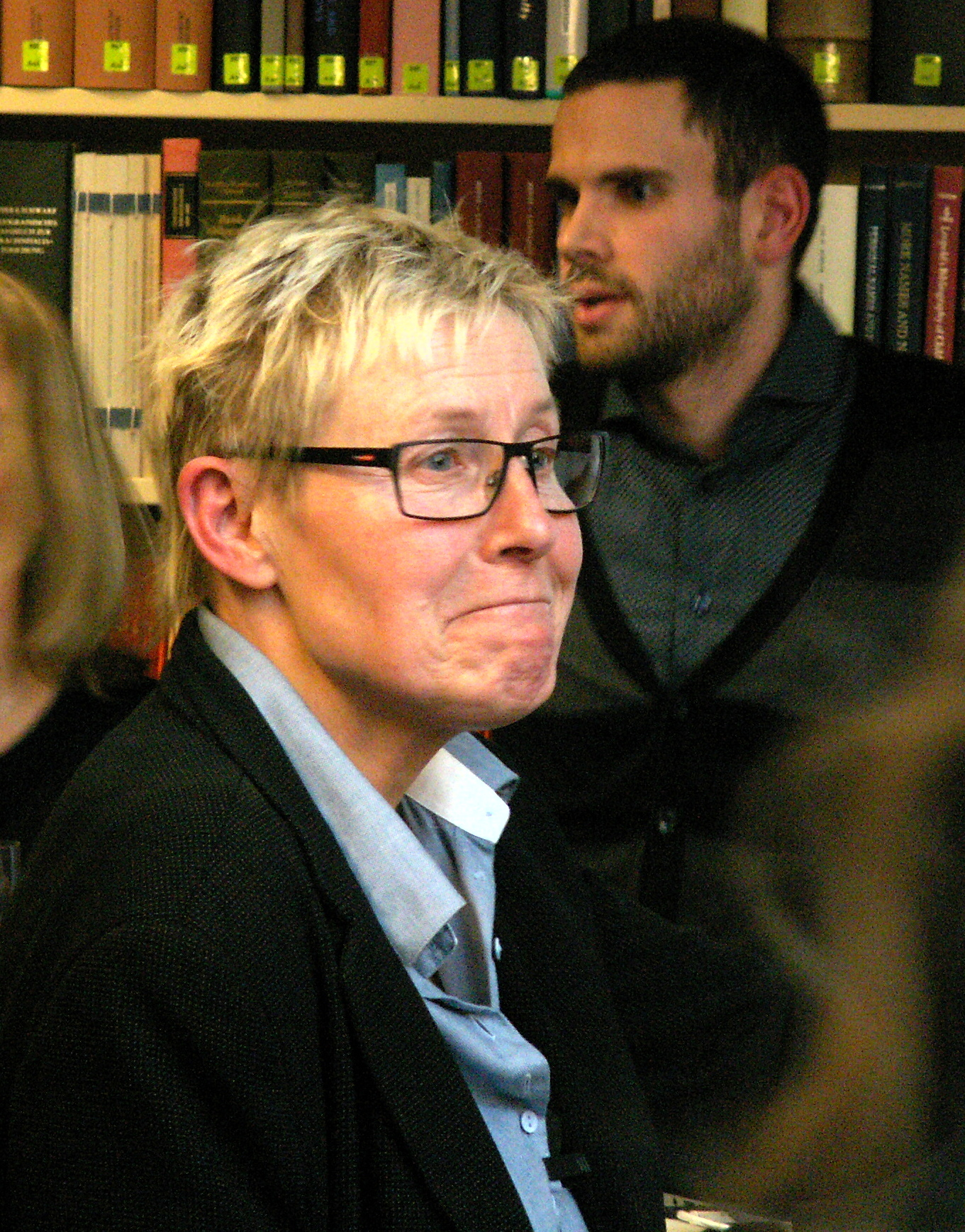
- Sjöberg in 2018
- Born: 1960

Academic background
- Education: Stads- och kommunhistoriska institutet, Stockholm University, PhD 1993

Academic work
- Discipline: Gender history
- Notable works: Svenskt kvinnobiografiskt lexikon

Maria Sjöberg (born 1960) is a Swedish historian. Sjöberg is one of the founding editors of the Svenskt kvinnobiografiskt lexikon, an online biographical dictionary of Swedish women first published in 2018. Sjöberg is a professor at the Department of Historical Studies of the University of Gothenburg, focusing on the history of gender in the early modern period.

== Biography ==
Maria Sjöberg was born in 1960. She studied at Stockholm University, completing a bachelor's degree in 1986. Sjöberg continued her studies at the Stads- och kommunhistoriska institutet (Institute of Urban History), a research institute affiliated with Stockholm University, defending her PhD thesis in 1993.

Sjöberg began as a faculty member at the University of Gothenburg in 1998. In the late 2010s, she collaborated with Lisbeth Larsson to compile the Svenskt kvinnobiografiskt lexikon (SKBL), an online biographical dictionary of notable Swedish women. The dictionary was launched on International Women's Day in 2018 with 1000 articles, and has expanded since. As of 2025, Sjöberg has authored 54 articles of the SKBL.

== Selected publications ==
=== In English ===
- Sjöberg, Maria (16 April 2022). "National Biographical Dictionary of Swedish Women : a renaissance of becoming visible". Women's History Review. 31 (3): 429–450. doi:10.1080/09612025.2021.1948177. ISSN 0961-2025.
- — (2016). "Gender Meets World History: Family and Political Regency". Entremons: UPF Journal of World History (8): 3–25. ISSN 2014-5217.
- — (15 March 2014). "Replacing a Father: civilian aspects of the Swedish military, 1600–1800". Scandinavian Journal of History. 39 (2): 226–245. doi:10.1080/03468755.2013.877399. ISSN 0346-8755.

=== In Swedish ===
- Sjöberg, Maria (2012). Kritiska tankar om historia [Critical thinking about history]. Lund: Studentlitteratur. ISBN 978-91-44-07433-7.
- — (1993). Järn och jord: bergsmän på 1700-talet [Iron and land: mining peasants during the 18th century] (PhD thesis). Stockholm: Stads- och kommunhistoriska institutet. ISBN 9789197164054.
