= Tania Ørum =

Danish feminist and literary historian

Paula Tatiana "Tania" Ørum (born 1945) is a Danish feminist, literary historian and writer who has specialized in women's and gender studies. Together with Lene Koch, in the 1970s she was one of the driving forces behind recognition of the need for university courses in women's research. This later led to the Danish gender and women's research centre KVINFO, to which she contributed from 1981 to 1990. Her own research has focused on the relationship between gender and literature as can be seen in her Pamelas Døtre (1985). Since her retirement in 2015 from the University of Copenhagen's Department of Arts and Cultural Studies, she continues to be an active writer and speaker, especially in connection with avant-garde art in the 1960s.

== Biography ==
Born in Tårbæk on 15 May 1945, Paula Tatiana Ørum was the daughter of the engineer Palle Peter Ørum (1915–1982) and his Russian-born wife Marina Levia née Piletski. In August 1976, she married the Danish author Hans-Jørgen Nielsen (1941–1991) with whom she had one child, Kristoffer (1975). The marriage was dissolved in 1987. In June 1989, she married the university lecturer Claus Bratt Østergaard (born 1943) with whom she had one child, Philip (1989).

After graduating from Aarhus Cathedral School in 1964, she spent a year in England. She then studied English at the University of Copenhagen where she participated in both the student and women's movements. This led to her establishment of the critical English Alternative Project (Engelsk Alternativ Project) which differed from the normal course of study at Copenhagen University's English Institute. She headed the project and taught there in 1972 and 1973. From 1974 to 1976, she was employed at the institute as an assistant teacher but was also active as a writer, translator and reviewer, focusing on English literature.

In 1976, after earning a master's degree in English and Danish, she taught for a short period at Virum Gymnasium and then decided to work as an editor for the publishing house Tiderne Skrifter. She returned to academic life, first as a teaching assistant, receiving a master's scholarship at the English Institute in 1979. She became one of the pioneers of women's research, combining research with teaching. Together with Lene Koch, she developed courses on women's studies which in 1981 led to the establishment of Kvinfo where she contributed until 1990. Unlike most academic works, her writings are expressed in a level of language which can be easily understood by non-professionals. This is reflected in her book about women's literature, Pamelas døtre (1985), which earned her the George Brandes Prize, awarded for critical literature.

In 1991, she was engaged as an associate professor at Copenhagen University's Department of Literary Studies, moving to the Department of Arts and Cultural Studies until her retirement in 2015. Together with Marie-Louise Svane, in 1991 she published the anthology Køn og moderne tider (Gender and Modern Times), she has been a co-editor of the journals Language and Literature, Kontext and Politisk Revy. In 2009, she published De eksperimenterende tressere (The Experimental Sixties) on how avant-garde art broke with tradition in the 1960s. Since she retired, Ørum has continued to speak on avant-garde art at conferences at home and abroad. She was the main editor of the four-volume A Cultural History of the Avant-Garde in the Nordic Countries which was completed in 2020.
