= Lisbeth Larsson =

Swedish literary historian (1949–2021)

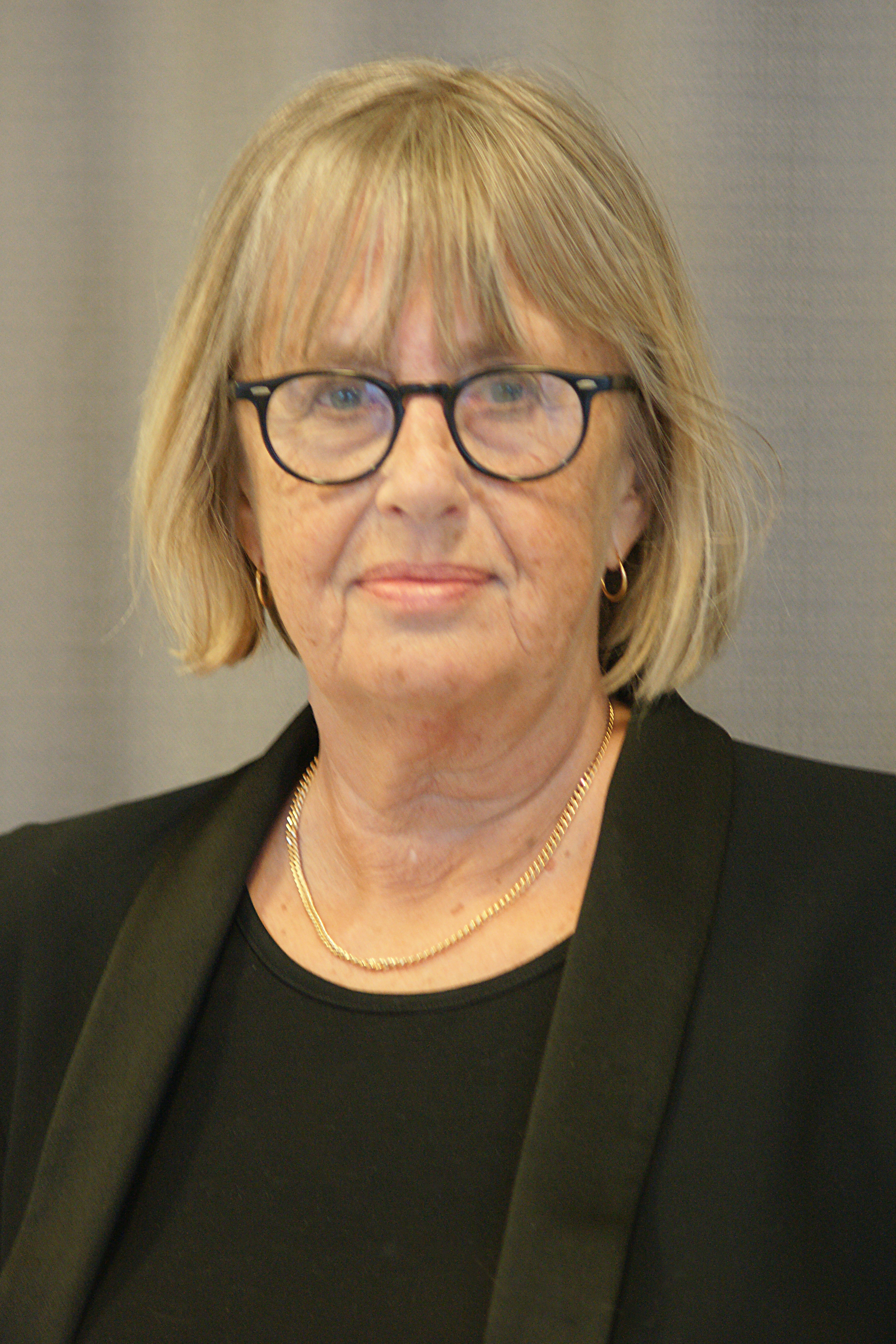
- Larsson in 2019
- Born: 11 May 1949; Vara, Skaraborg County, Sweden
- Died: 16 October 2021 (aged 72); Skillinge, Skåne County, Sweden
- Burial place: Lund, Skåne County, Sweden
- Awards: Honorary doctorate, Faculty of Humanities, University of Southern Denmark, 2012

Academic background
- Education: Lund University

Academic work
- Discipline: Literary history, gender studies
- Notable works: Svenskt kvinnobiografiskt lexikon

Lisbeth Helena Larsson (1949–2021) was a Swedish literary historian and researcher who from 2000 was professor of literary studies at the University of Gothenburg where she focused on gender studies. Drawing on the archive of women's history at the Arts Faculty Library, she published a book on women from Gothenburg, Hundrade och en Göteborgskvinnor (101 Gothenburg Women). It paved the way for a grant from the Bank of Sweden Tercentenary Foundation which in March 2018 led to the establishment of Svenskt kvinnobiografiskt lexikon, a searchable biographical dictionary of Swedish women. Larsson is also remembered as a theatre and literature critic for the newspaper Expressen.

== Early life, family and education ==
Born in Vara on 11 May 1949, Lisbeth Helena Larsson was the daughter of the bicycle shop owner, Knut Wilhelm Larsson and his wife Karen Linnea. She had an elder sister, Carina Maria. In the early 1980s, she married Börge Persson, with whom she had a son, Carl Martin Viktor Perrson. She soon divorced him and went on to marry Jan Henning Pettersson with whom she spent the rest of her life.

In 1968, Larsson matriculated in Skara. After graduating from the University of Gothenburg, she taught religion and Swedish in secondary schools. She later continued her education at Lund University where she studied literature. In 1989, she earned a Ph.D with a thesis titled En annan historia: om kvinnors läsning och svensk veckopress (Another story: about women's reading and the Swedish weekly press), addressing the contempt academic have for weekly women's magazines and their readers.

== Career ==
While studying in Lund, Larsson promoted her feminist views with colleagues and friends. Her research soon revealed that unlike their male equivalents, women's diaries and autobiographical articles had not usually been preserved or catalogued. Collaborating with Eva Haettner Aurelius and Christina Sjöblad, in 1991 she published Kvinnors självbiografier och dagböcker i Sverige: Bibliografisk förteckning 1650-1989 (Women's autobiographies and diaries in Sweden: Bibliographic listing 1650–1989). She then devoted her attention to books, becoming a driving force behind Nordisk kvinnolitteraturhistoria, published in English as The History of Nordic Women's Literature.

Drawing on the archive of women's history at the Arts Faculty Library which had been developed since 1950, she published a book on women from Gothenburg titled Hundrade och en Göteborgskvinnor (101 Gothenburg Women). Her efforts to extend the archive and transform it into a digital, searchable database finally culminated in a grant from the Bank of Sweden Tercentenary Foundation. In March 2018, it was therefore possible to establish Svenskt kvinnobiografiskt lexikon, a searchable biographical dictionary of Swedish women in both Swedish and English. In parallel with her academic interests, from 1980 Larsson became a theatre and literature critic for the newspaper Göteborgs-Tidningen and went on to contribute to Expressen. From 2003, for a number of years she frequently contributed articles on literature to Dagens Nyheter and Götebprgs-Posten. Her Promenader i Virginia Woolf's London (2014), published in English as Walking Virginia Woolf's London (2017), examines Woolf's novels in the light of her characters' literary geography, with particular attention to gender.

Lisbeth Larsson died in Skillinge on 16 October 2021 and is buried in Lund.

== Awards ==
In 2012, for her contributions to research into Nordic literature, Larsson was awarded an honorary doctorate by the Faculty of Humanities, University of Southern Denmark.
