= Elisabeth Møller Jensen =

Danish literary historian and feminist

Elisabeth Møller Jensen (born 1946) is a Danish literary historian and feminist. From 1990 to 2014 she was director of Kvinfo, the Danish Centre for Information on Women and Gender. She has also contributed as a literary critic to several of Denmark's national newspapers and has lectured on women's research and politics.

== Biography ==
Born on 31 December 1946 in Lemvig in the west of Jutland, Elisabeth Møller Jensen is the daughter of the baker and specialist worker Tage M. Jensen (1921–1994) and his wife Gudrun Borgholm (1921–1975). She grew up in a social democratic milieu where, together her three siblings, she attended high school, matriculating from Struer Gymnasium in 1967. She then moved to the capital where she studied Danish and Russian at Copenhagen University. She later specialized in Danish, earning a Cand.phil. in 1977.

From 1973, Møller Jensen began to teach at the university and became more politically active, joining various radical left-wing organizations. She went on to take short-term teaching assignments at several different universities, earning an M.A. in Nordic literature from Aarhus University in 1984. Her dissertation on the Norwegian writer Camilla Collet was published in 1987 as Emancipation som lidenskab (Emancipation as a Passion).

From 1981, she became centrally involved in a research project which culminated in her role as editor of Nordisk kvindelitteraturhistorie (Nordic Women's Literary History) published in five extensive volumes from 1993 to 1998. Møller Jensen became the director of Kvinfo in 1990, increasing its staffing threefold, redesigning its magazine Forum and creating Europe's first online database devoted to women. In 2006, she initiated Kvinfo's Women in Dialogue programme, focused on women in the Middle East. She retired from Kvinfo in February 2014 after almost 24 years of service.

== Awards ==
Møller Jensen has received several awards including the Lis Jacobsen prize in 1994 for her work as editor of Nordisk Kvindelitteraturhistorie and the Tagea Brandt Rejselegat travel scholarship in 2004. In 2006, she was honoured as a Knight of the Order of the Dannebrog.
