= Dansk kvindebiografisk leksikon =

Dansk kvindebiografisk leksikon ("Biographical Encyclopedia of Danish Women") is a collection of over 1,900 biographies of Danish women from the Middle Ages to the present. The first edition was published in 2001 by Rosinante & Co, Copenhagen. Free searchable online access is available from the website of KVINFO.
