= Edith Deen =

American Christian writer (1905–1994)

Edith Alderman Deen (28 February 1905 – 3 January 1994) was an American Christian writer.

She studied at the Stephen F. Austin State Teachers College and Texas Christian University before working for the Fort Worth Press, where she was a columnist and women's editor from 1925 to 1954. She wrote six books: All the Women of the Bible (1955), Great Women of the Christian Faith (1959), Family Living in the Bible (1963), The Bible's Legacy for Womanhood (1970), All the Bible's Men of Hope (1974), and Wisdom from Women in the Bible (1978).

Deen later studied at Texas Woman's University, where she also served as regent for twelve years. She was a member of the Fort Worth City Council from 1965 to 1967. Deen was a member of the Disciples of Christ.
