= Iowa Authors and Their Works =

Bibliography

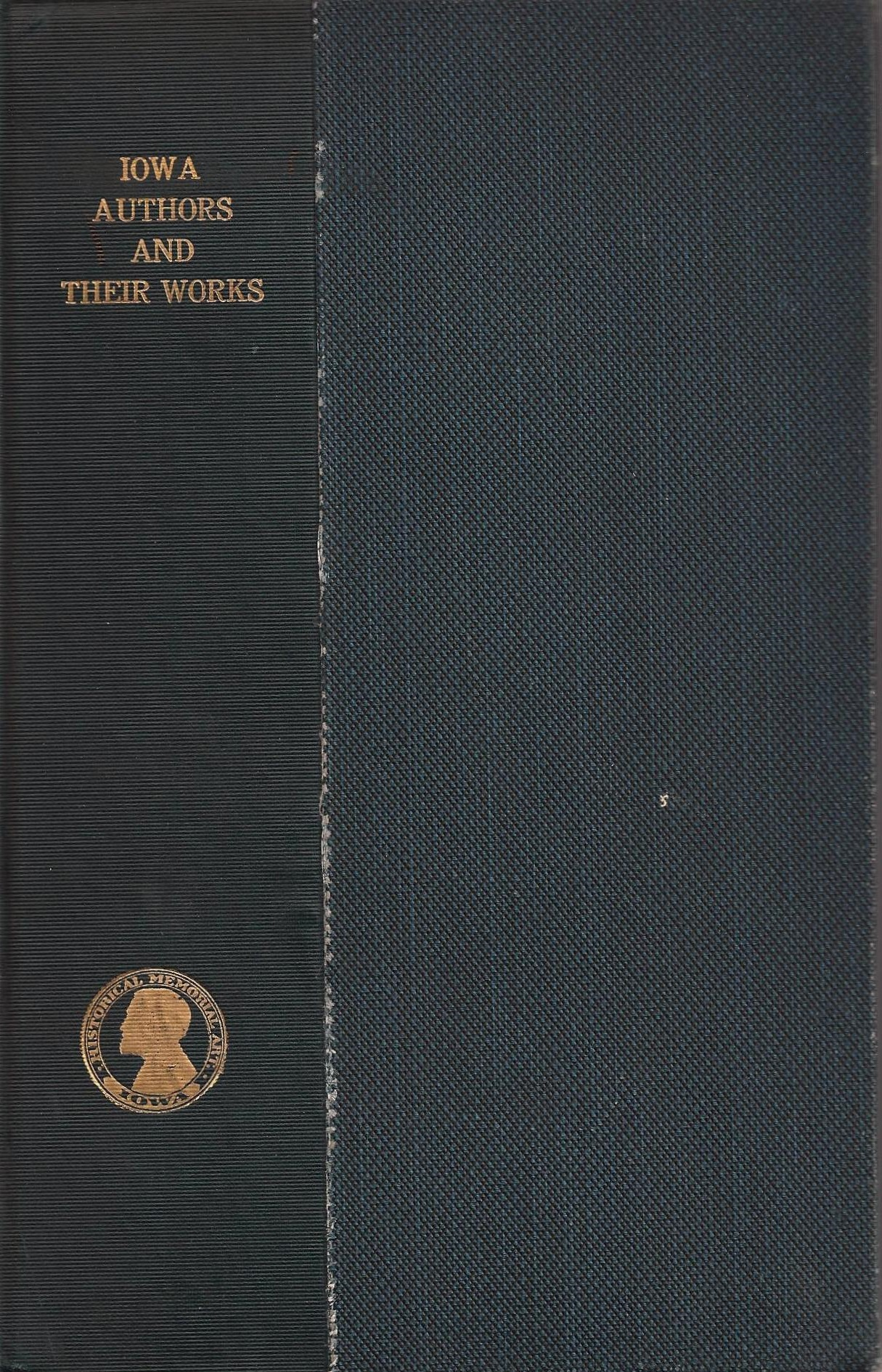
- Cover
- Author: Alice Marple
- Language: English
- Genre: Bibliography
- Publication date: 1918
- Publication place: United States

Iowa Authors and Their Works is a 1918 bibliography of authors from the U.S. state of Iowa and their writing. Alice Marple compiled the book while she was the assistant curator of the State Historical Society of Iowa. It contains around 1,000 authors.

== Publication ==
Alice Marple was the assistant curator of the State Historical Society of Iowa. The publication was an attempt by the organization to document all Iowa authors and their writing starting from 1880 to 1918. The book contains a list of around 1,000 authors from Iowa. Marple added magazine writers, short story authors, and Iowa Press and Authors' Club members to the book. Each author had their birth date, death date if applicable, a list of books, publication dates, and publishers. Some of the listed authors moved away from Iowa as children, and some of them did not live in Iowa until they were elderly. Dictionary of Midwestern Literature, Volume 2 said that authors had to either have lived in Iowa or were somehow identified to the state to be included. Marple obtained the list through multiple sources, including a list, compiled by Anna Belknap Howe (b.1849), that the Library Commission published in 1904. Marple's work was initially published in parts within the Annals of Iowa. The goal was to have all authors from Iowa and their works listed. The sections mainly contain non-fiction writing, but there is also some literature: poetry, fiction, and drama. Marple republished the sections into a 1918 book.

== Reception ==
Frank Luther Mott said in his book Literature of Pioneer Life in Iowa, "This is far the most comprehensive and useful work of Iowa bibliography." Volume 15 of the Indiana Magazine of History said that "the scheme of the bibliography is not clear."
