= Nynne Koch =

Anna Lise (Nynne) Koch (1915–2001) was a Danish feminist, writer and a pioneering researcher in gender studies. After publishing novels in the 1950s, she joined the Royal Danish Library in 1961 where she paved the way for establishing Kvinfo, the Danish Centre for Research on Women and Gender. In the early 1980s, she organized courses on women's studies (feminologie) at the People's University (Folkeuniversitetet) in Copenhagen and edited the journal Forum for Kvindeforskning. Recognizing her contributions to women's studies, Roskilde University awarded her an honorary doctorate in 1986.

== Early life, family and education ==
Born in Copenhagen on 13 December 1915, Anna Lise Koch was the daughter of the high court presiding judge Jørgen Hansen Koch (1861–1935) and his wife Anine née Suenson (1881–1948) who had received violin lessons from Carl Nielsen. She had a younger brother, Peter Anton. In 1936, she married the civil engineer Erik Middelboe with whom she had three children, Karen (1938), Lene (1938) and Lone (1938). The marriage was dissolved in 1940. In 1945, she married the antique book dealer Niels Kaaber. The marriage was dissolved in 1947. From 1952 to 1961, she partnered the Polish office manager Israel Harry Konzen (1911–1976) with whom she had two children, Jørn (1952) and Kim (1954).

Brought up in a privileged family environment in Amaliegade, she enjoyed considerable freedom although she was expected to achieve substantial accomplishments in life. After being privately tutored, when she was 16 she attended N. Zahle's School but as an outstanding pupil soon moved to the Polyteknisk Læreanstalt where she began to study architecture. However, as a result of her performance, she transferred to engineering. It was here she first experienced discrimination which possibly influenced her interest in feminism.

== Career ==
In the mid-1930s, she met and married Erik Middelboe. The family moved to Kullen in nearby Sweden, where she spent the next few years raising a family. During the Second World War she embarked on her literary career, writing detective stories with her fried Regitze Caroc. When she moved together with Korzen, she began publishing her own novels: Møde med sig selv (1950), followed by Hug en hæl (1952) and Tagfat med en drøm (1954) in which she promotes a biological view of life, births and nature playing a central role. Thereafter, her articles increasingly supported women's liberation and the new women's movement.

After leaving Korzen, in 1961 she was engaged by the Royal Danish Library in a clerical position. Despite her lack of formal training, she embarked on an outstanding career in librarianship. Drawing on the development of the Kvinnohistoriska Samlingarna established in 1958 in Gothenburg and the creation of the Women's History Collection (Kvindehistorisk Samling) in 1964 at the State and University Library in Aarhus, she managed to convince the national librarian Palle Birkelund that it was important to highlight literature relevant to women in the collection of the National Library. She was initially permitted to devote time to making a catalogue of women's literature but in 1973 she was appointed coordinator of books relating to feminism, including responsibility for purchasing relevant works.

Thanks to her sense of public relations, she coined the term "feminology" to describe her department. In 1971, in connection with the 100th anniversary of the Danish Women's Society, she organized a Feminology Exhibition, tracing feminism from ancient Greece to Denmark's Red Stocking Movement. From 1975, she encouraged attention to women's studies in Danish universities, promoting interest in the subject at the People's University in Copenhagen where she headed the new department. In addition to establishing Kvinfo, in 1981, she launched the journal Forum for kvindeforskning, the first to focus on gender research in Denmark. Thanks to her efforts, in 1986 the Finance Act provided for a number of women's research lectureships as well as for the funding of Kvinfo as an independent research library. Confident that Kvinfo had now been safeguarded for the future, she was able to retire in 1987.

In 1999, Nynne Koch published her memoirs Ved nærmere eftertanke (On Closer Reflection).

Nynne Koch died in Copenhagen on 15 May 2001 and is buried in Vestre Cemetery.

== Honours and awards ==
In 1980, Koch was awarded the Georg Brandes prize for her contributions to Danish literature. In 1981 she received the Women's Prize (Kvindepris) from the magazine Alt for Damerne. In 1986, she was awarded an honorary doctorate for her contributions to gender studies by Roskilde University.
