= Daryl Cumber Dance =

American academic (born 1938)

- Born: Daryl Veronica Cumber; January 17, 1938 (age 88); Richmond, Virginia, U.S.
- Education: Virginia State College; University of Virginia; PhD in English
- Occupation: Academic
- Known for: Black folklore

Daryl Cumber Dance (born January 17, 1938) is an American academic best known for her work on black folklore.

== Biography ==
Daryl Veronica Cumber was born in Richmond, Virginia, to Allen and Veronica Bell Cumber. She attended Ruthville High School in Ruthville, Virginia, and earned a bachelor's degree in English from Virginia State College in 1957. She then taught at Armstrong High School in Richmond until 1962, when she returned to Virginia State College as an instructor. The next year, she completed a master's degree from Virginia State. In 1971, she graduated from the University of Virginia with a doctorate in English, and was named an assistant professor at Virginia State. She taught at Virginia Commonwealth University between 1972 and 1993, when she joined the University of Richmond faculty. In 2013, she was appointed Sterling A. Brown Professor of English at Howard University.

Dance has served as advisory editor of the Black American Literary Forum and editorial advisor of the Journal of West Indian Literature. She is a member of the Wintergreen Women Writers Collective.

== Works ==
- Shuckin' and Jivin': Folklore from Contemporary Black Americans (1978)
- Folklore from Contemporary Jamaicans (1985)
- Fifty Caribbean Writers: A Bio-Bibliographical Critical Sourcebook (1986)
- Long Gone: The Mecklenburg Six and the Theme of Escape in Black Folklore (1987)
- New World Adams: Conversations With Contemporary West Indian Writers (1992)
- Honey, Hush!: An Anthology of African American Women's Humor (1998)
- From My People: 400 Years of African American Folklore (2002)
- In Search of Annie Drew: Jamaica Kincaid's Mother and Muse (2016)
