= Ørum Djurs =

Village in Norddjurs Municipality, Denmark

Ørum Djurs Ørum
- Village
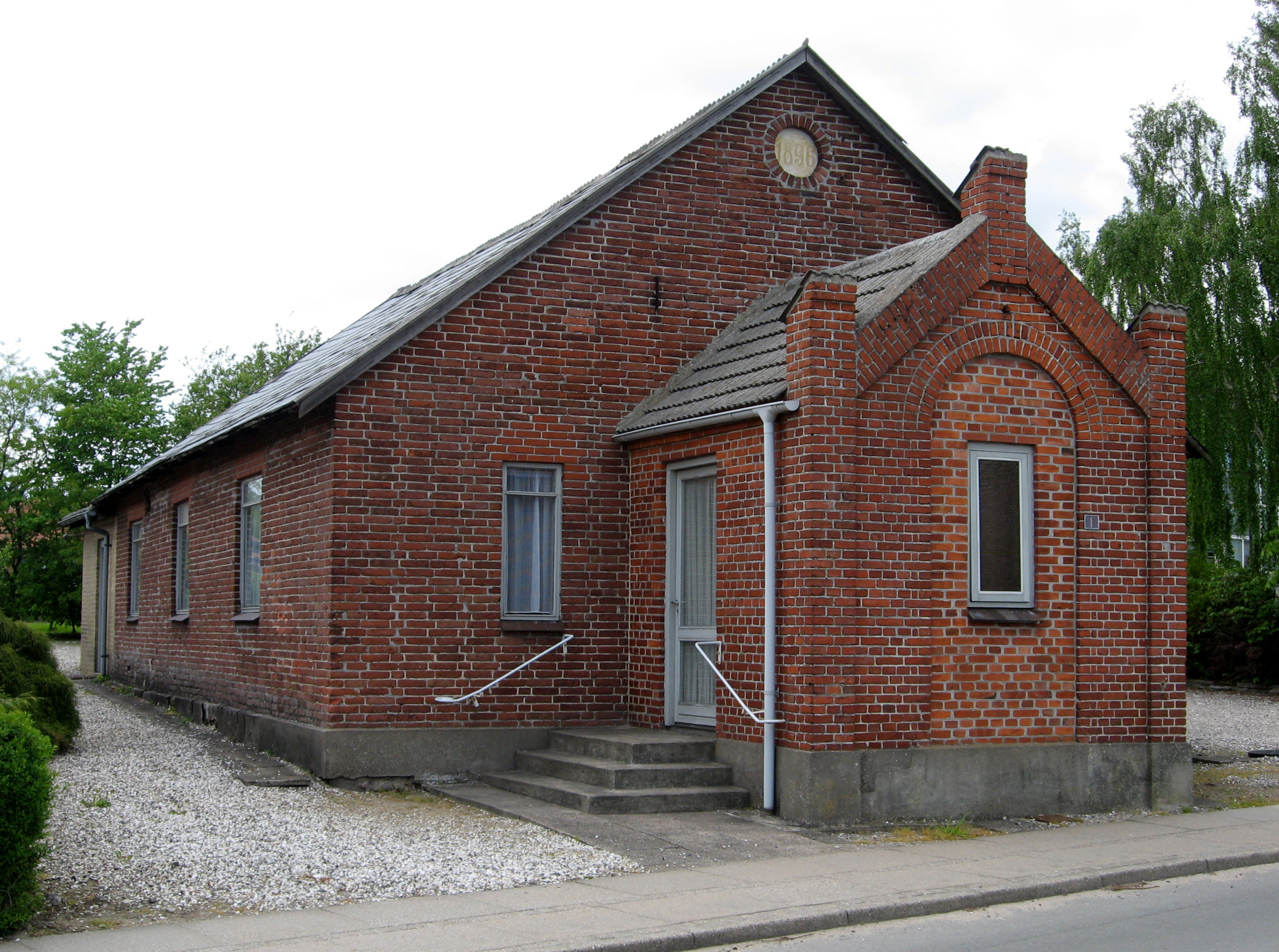
- Mission house in Ørum Djurs

- Location in the Central Denmark Region Ørum Djurs (Denmark)
- Coordinates: 56°26′35″N 10°40′41″E
- Country: Denmark
- Region: Central Denmark Region
- Municipality: Norddjurs Municipality
- Parish: Ørum Parish

Population (1 January 2026)
  - Total: 681
- Time zone: UTC+1 (CET)
  - Summer (DST): UTC+2 (CEST)
- Postal code: 8586

Ørum Djurs, commonly known as Ørum, is a village on the Djursland peninsula in Jutland, Denmark. It is situated in Norddjurs Municipality in the Central Denmark Region and lies within Ørum Parish. The village had a population of 681 on 1 January 2026.

== Development ==
Ørum underwent substantial residential development during the 1970s. The village expanded northwest along Stenvadvej and northeast along Brændtvadvej. According to Norddjurs Municipality's 2025 municipal plan, its population has remained relatively stable in recent years at approximately 700 residents.

== Landmarks ==
Ørum Church, the parish church of Ørum Parish, is located in the village.
