= The History of Nordic Women's Literature =

Literature of Nordic Women

- Editor: Elisabeth Møller Jensen
- Original title: Nordisk Kvindelitteraturhistorie
- Language: Swedish, Danish and English
- Subject: Literature
- Genre: Nonfiction
- Publisher: KVINFO, Copenhagen & Kvinnsam
- Publication place: Sweden
- English publication date: 1997
- Website: nordicwomensliterature.net

The History of Nordic Women's Literature (Danish: Nordisk kvindelitteraturhistorie, Swedish: Nordisk kvinnolitteraturhistoria) is a print and online encyclopedia and biographical dictionary about female Nordic authors.

The original print version was written in five volumes (four encyclopedic volumes plus a "bio-bibliographical" volume) over 25 years by about 100 scholars from different Nordic countries. The first volume was published in 1993 in Swedish and Danish and the last in 1998. A digital version was released in Danish, Swedish, and English in 2012. As of February 2015 the online version hosts 235 articles and bibliographical information for 821 writers. It is searchable and organized by name, country, period, and keyword. Each of the four encyclopedic volumes comprises topic-based articles, often grouped thematically. The third volume, for example, is divided into "self", "desire", and "gender and the war".

The work covers authors from Sweden, Norway, Finland, Denmark, Iceland, Greenland, Faroe Islands, and Åland. The information on the authors in the online version is updated as necessary but no new authors (in addition to those included in the book version) are to be included as Kvinfo is planning a project on new women authors.

The Danish and English versions of the work are published and owned by Kvinfo, the Danish Centre for Information on Gender, Equality, and Ethnicity in Copenhagen while the Swedish version is published and owned by KvinnSam, the National Resource Library for Gender Studies in Gothenburg. It is funded by Riksbankens Jubileumsfond (Sweden) and the A.P. Møller & Chastine Mc-Kinney Møller Foundation (Denmark).

== Bibliography ==
The Danish book edition is contained in the five volumes cited below:

- Aurelius, Eva Haettner; Mai, Anne-Marie (1993). Nordisk kvindelitteraturhistorie. Rosinante/Munksgård. ISBN 978-87-16-10311-6.
- Aurelius, Eva Haettner; Mai, Anne-Marie (1993). Nordisk kvindelitteraturhistorie: Faderhuset, 1800-tallet. Rosinante. ISBN 978-87-16-10389-5.
- Jensen, Elisabeth Møller (1993). Nordisk kvindelitteraturhistorie: 1900-1960. Vide verden. 3. bind. Rosinante. ISBN 978-87-16-14665-6.
- Jensen, Elisabeth Møller (1993). Nordisk kvindelitteraturhistorie: 1960-1990. På jorden. 4. bind. Rosinante. ISBN 978-87-16-14665-6.
- Jensen, Elisabeth Møller (1993). Nordisk kvindelitteraturhistorie: Liv og værk. 5. bind. Rosinante. ISBN 978-87-16-14665-6.
