= Julia A. Orum =

American educator (1843–1904)

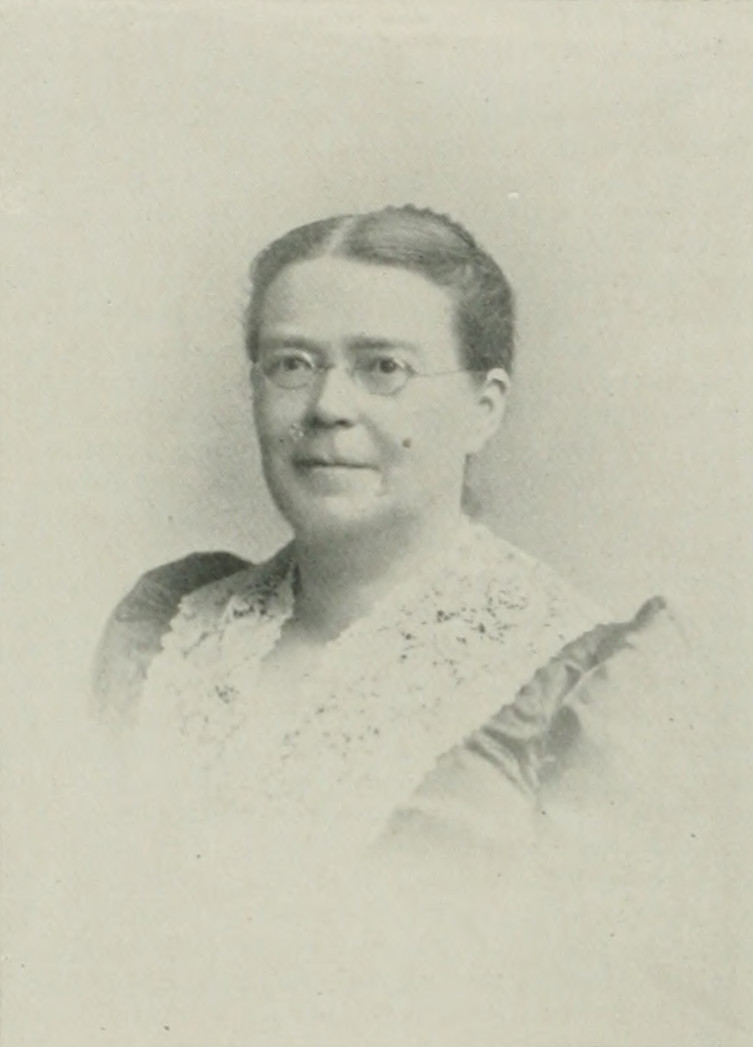
- "A Woman of the Century"
- Born: Julia Anna Orum; October 28, 1843; Philadelphia, Pennsylvania, U.S.
- Died: January 6, 1904 (aged 60); Philadelphia
- Education: Philadelphia Normal School
- Occupations: educator; lecturer; author
- Writing career
- Subject: elocution
- Notable work: The Orum System for Voice Education

Signature
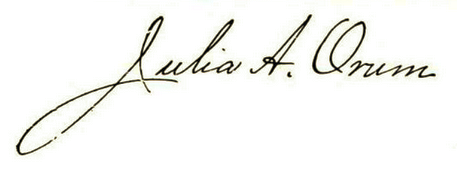

Julia A. Orum (October 28, 1843 – January 6, 1904) was an American educator, lecturer, and author. She was principal of the Philadelphia School of Elocution and of the Mountain Lake Park Summer School of Elocution. She was a successful Shakespearian reader and lecturer.

== Early life and education ==
Julia Anna Orum was born in Philadelphia, Pennsylvania, October 28, 1843. (Note: According to Willard & Livermore (1893), Julia was born October 28, 1844.) Her parents were Charles L. and Keturah Orum. One of her maternal ancestors, Leonard Keyser, was burned at the stake for his faith, in 1527. Another of that stanch Holland family, Dirck Keyser, settled in Germantown, Pennsylvania, in 1688, and helped to establish a school there under Francis David Pastorius. One of her paternal ancestors, Bartholomew Longstreth, of Yorkshire, England, was disinherited for becoming a Quaker and came to the U.S. in 1698. Julia's siblings were: Rachel, Mira, Morris, Ellen, and Nellie.

Orum was graduated with honor from the Philadelphia Normal School (later, Philadelphia High School for Girls), when she was 20 years of age. Having chosen the teaching of elocution as her profession, she studied for several years with the veteran tragedian and elocutionist, James B. Roberts.

== Career ==
For years, she was connected as instructor in elocution with the YMCA of Philadelphia and Germantown. She taught with marked success in several private schools, until she established an institution of her own, in 1885. She was principal of the Philadelphia School of Elocution; principal of the Mountain Lake Park Summer School of Elocution; and instructor of voice training in the Woman's College of Baltimore.

The fundamental idea in her system was the correct and adequate expression of the thought contained in the passage to be rendered. In voice-culture, correct abdominal breathing and tone-production was the key to her system. Her method was that taught by the English tragedian, James Fennell: principles, rather than rules; the analysis of sense as the basis of delivery; and the naturalness of the height of art.

Becoming a Christian, she determined to use her talent and culture, as far as possible, to help those who teach or preach. Large numbers of ministers and teachers came under her instruction. Many young women, whose voice had given out under the strain of constant school-room reiterations, was saved from pulmonary and throat diseases by Oram's teaching. Men with faulty vocal habits were kept in the pulpit by Orum's voice-culture and became far more effective in the delivery of sermons. Her Shakespearean readings and impersonations won her more popularity than her Bible readings.

She was the author of a work entitled The Orum System for Voice Education (1895), and was a constant contributor to periodical publications. The exercises given in the book were unique and practical.

Orum was actively engaged in the philanthropic and benevolent work of the church, particularly its home missions. In 1884, she served as an officer of the Woman's Home Missionary Society (Philadelphia Conference).

== Death ==
In her later life, Orum was a patient at the Philadelphia Home for Incurables. On January 8, 1904, she was scalded to death in a bath at the institution.

== Selected works ==
- The Orum System for Voice Education (1895)
