= Ørum Church (Skive Municipality) =

Coordinates: 56°34′07″N 9°14′13″E

Ørum Kirke
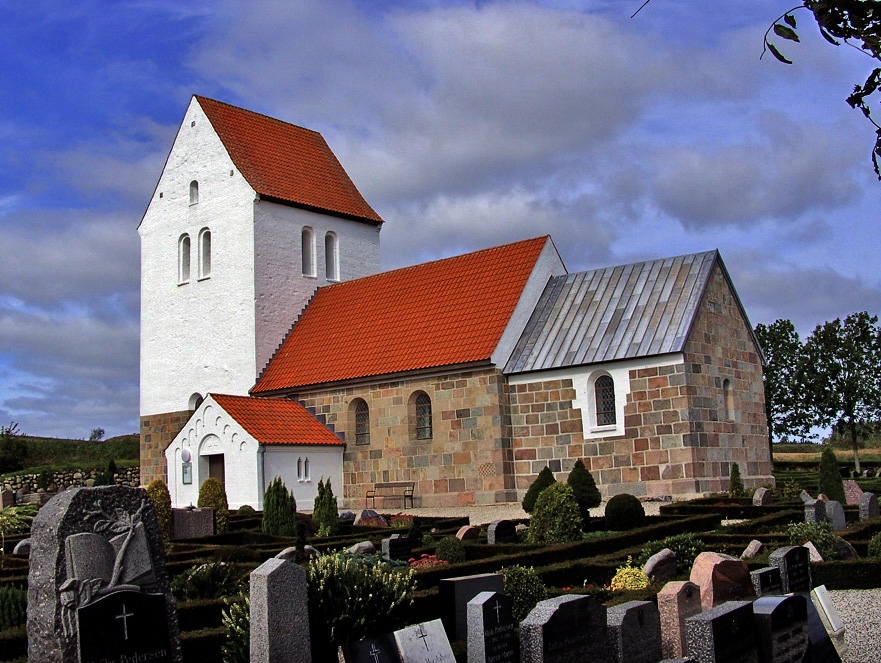
- Ørum Kirke
- Location: Ørumvej 120, Nr Ørum, 7840 Højslev, Skive Kommune, Denmark
- Website: sogn.dk/oerum-skive/

Administration
- Diocese: Diocese of Viborg
- Deanery: Skive Provsti
- Parish: Ørum Sogn (Skive Kommune)

Ørum Church (Danish: Ørum Kirke) is a church in the town of Nørre Ørum in Skive Municipality, Denmark and serves as the seat of Ørum Parish.

The church is located on a hill near Hjarbæk Fjord, which had a substantial port during the Middle Ages, but was abandoned after the water level fell.

== Building ==
The tower was first erected during the 17th century, followed by the altar and pulpit. The altar is decorated with manneristic paintings and an altarpiece painting from 1858 by N. Skov.

The choir and nave were built in the romanesque style and have flat beamed ceilings. A stone on the choir's southeast corner is inlaid with a check pattern and its meaning is a subject of debate. The panels and doors in the nave are decorated with pietistic allegorical paintings from the 18th century.

In 1894, the church porch was added and in 1957 the church was renovated. Both of the church's original rectangular doors have been preserved; the south door is still in use, though the north door has been walled in. The church's bell was constructed in the 13th century and was in use until 1972.

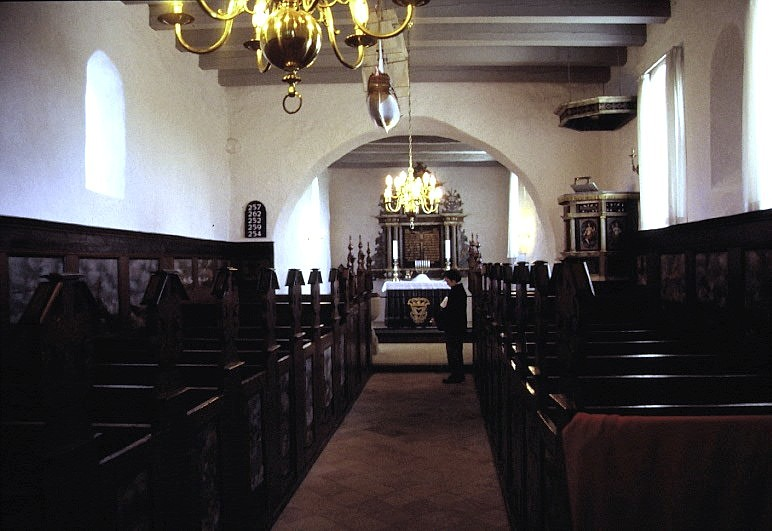
The nave and altar

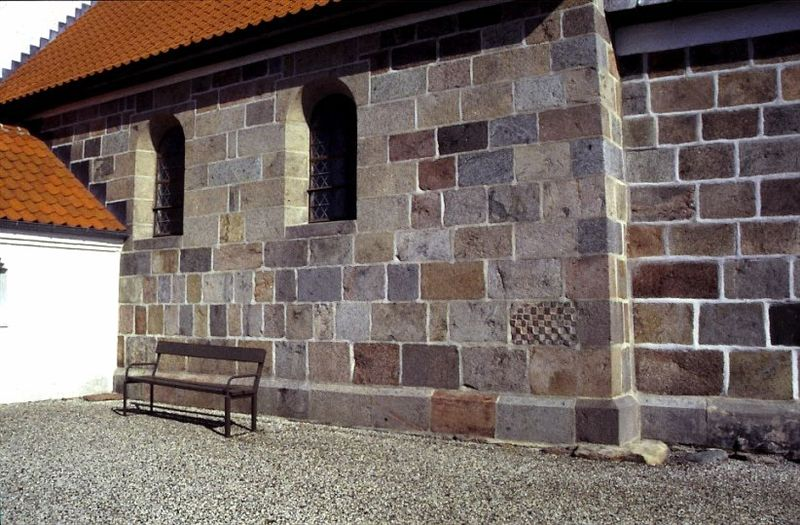
The nave's south side with a checker pattern

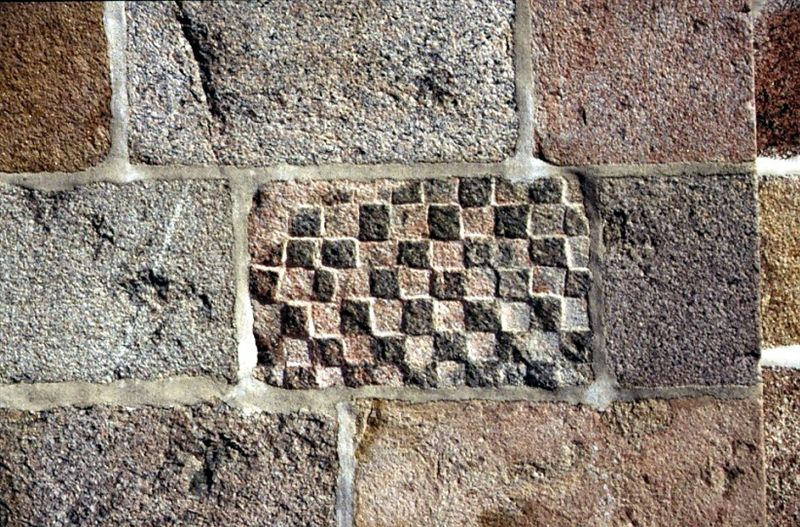
Closeup of check pattern
