= Ørum Church (Norddjurs Municipality) =

Coordinates: 56°26′35″N 10°40′41″E

- Ørum Kirke
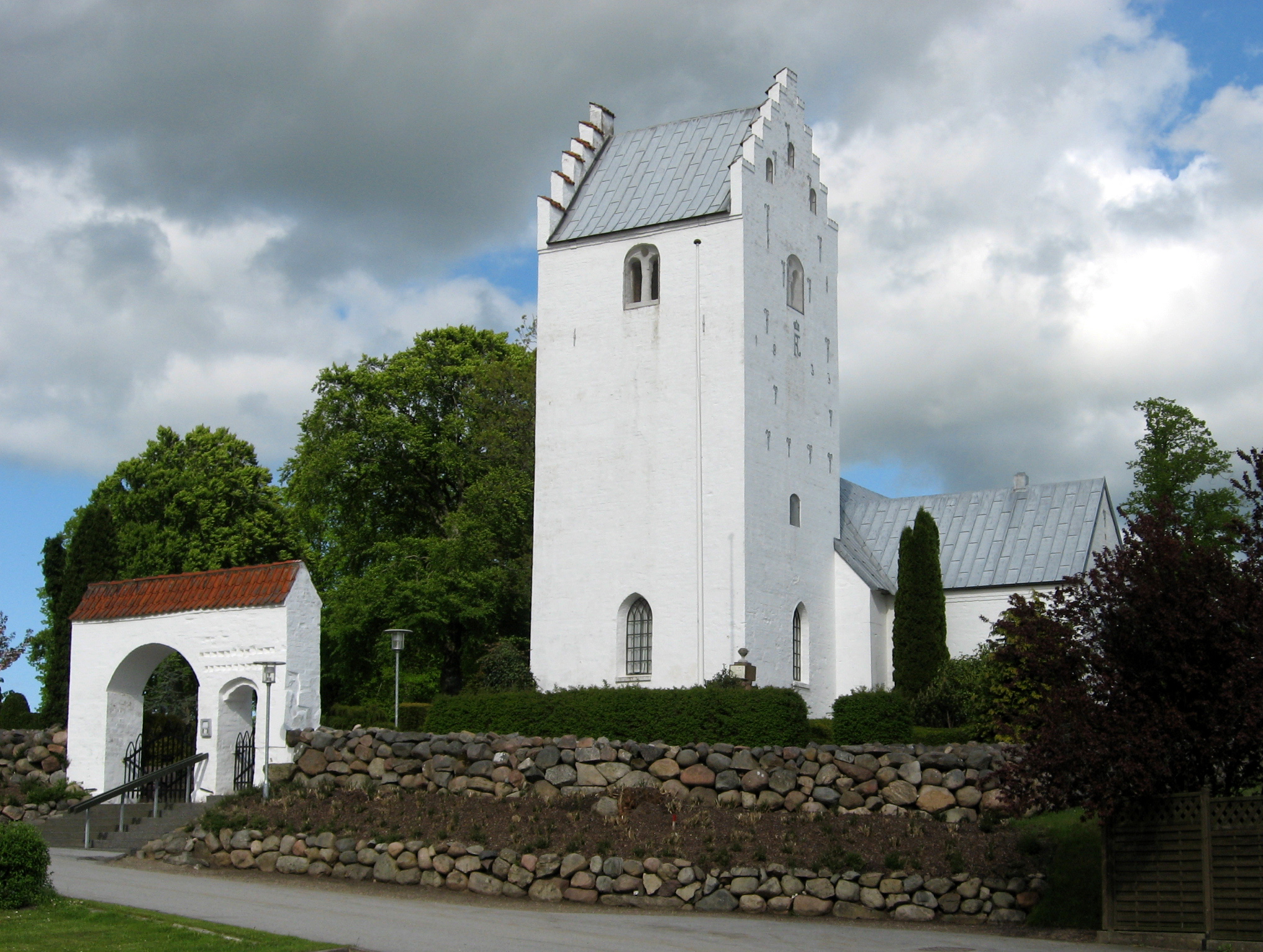
- Ørum Kirke from the southwest
- Ørum Church
- Location: Åbrovej 38A, 8586 Ørum Djurs, Norddjurs Kommune
- Country: Denmark
- Tradition: Evangelical Lutheran
- Religious institute: Church of Denmark
- Website: norddjursmidtpastorat.dk/page/8/%C3%B8rum-sogn

History
- Founded: 1100s

Administration
- Diocese: Diocese of Aarhus
- Deanery: Norddjurs Provsti
- Parish: Ørum Sogn

Clergy
- Pastor: Vibeke Høggard Sommer

Ørum Church (Danish: Ørum Kirke) is a church in the village of Ørum Djurs in Norddjurs Municipality.

The church was established in the 12th century and operates as the central church in Ørum Sogn within the Diocese of Aarhus. Ørum Sogn has approximately 1,600 members within the Church of Denmark.

== History ==
The church began construction in the 12th century and consists of a romanesque nave and a gothic choir, sacristy, bell tower, and church porch. In the first half of the 16th century the church was decorated with frescos, but they were greatly damaged and have since been painted over.

The tower was partially rebuilt in 1833, at which time the monogram of King Frederick VI of Denmark was embedded in the southside of the tower. The church was again renovated in 1961, mainly by the architect A. Graae. During the renovations the sacristy was given its own entrance on the church's northern side.

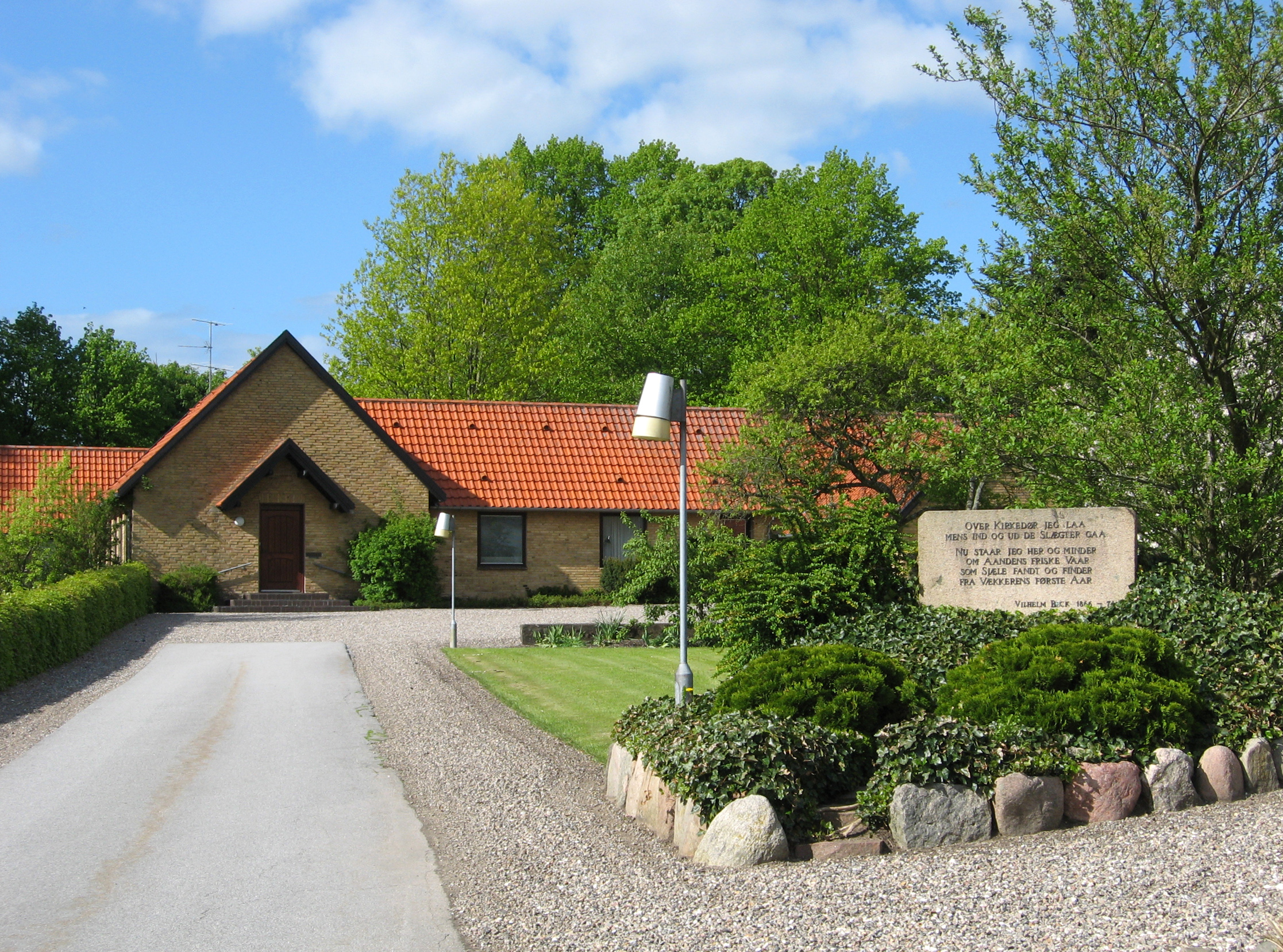
The Vilhelm Beck memorial in front of the clergy house

The clergy house is northwest of the church and was built in 1952 after a considerably older clergy house burned down. South of the clergy house lies a memorial stone for Vilhelm Beck (1829-1901), who was a priest at the church from 1866 until 1874. The stone was the old lintel above the church's south door. The text on the stone reads:

Over kirkedør jeg laa mens ind og ud de slægter gaa
Nu staar jeg her og minder om aandens friske vaar som sjæle fand og finder fra vækkerens første aar

Translation:

Above the church door I laid while generations went in and out
Now I stand here reminiscing about the spirit's fresh spring which souls found and find from the awakener's first year
