= Bank of Sweden Tercentenary Foundation =

Swedish-based foundation

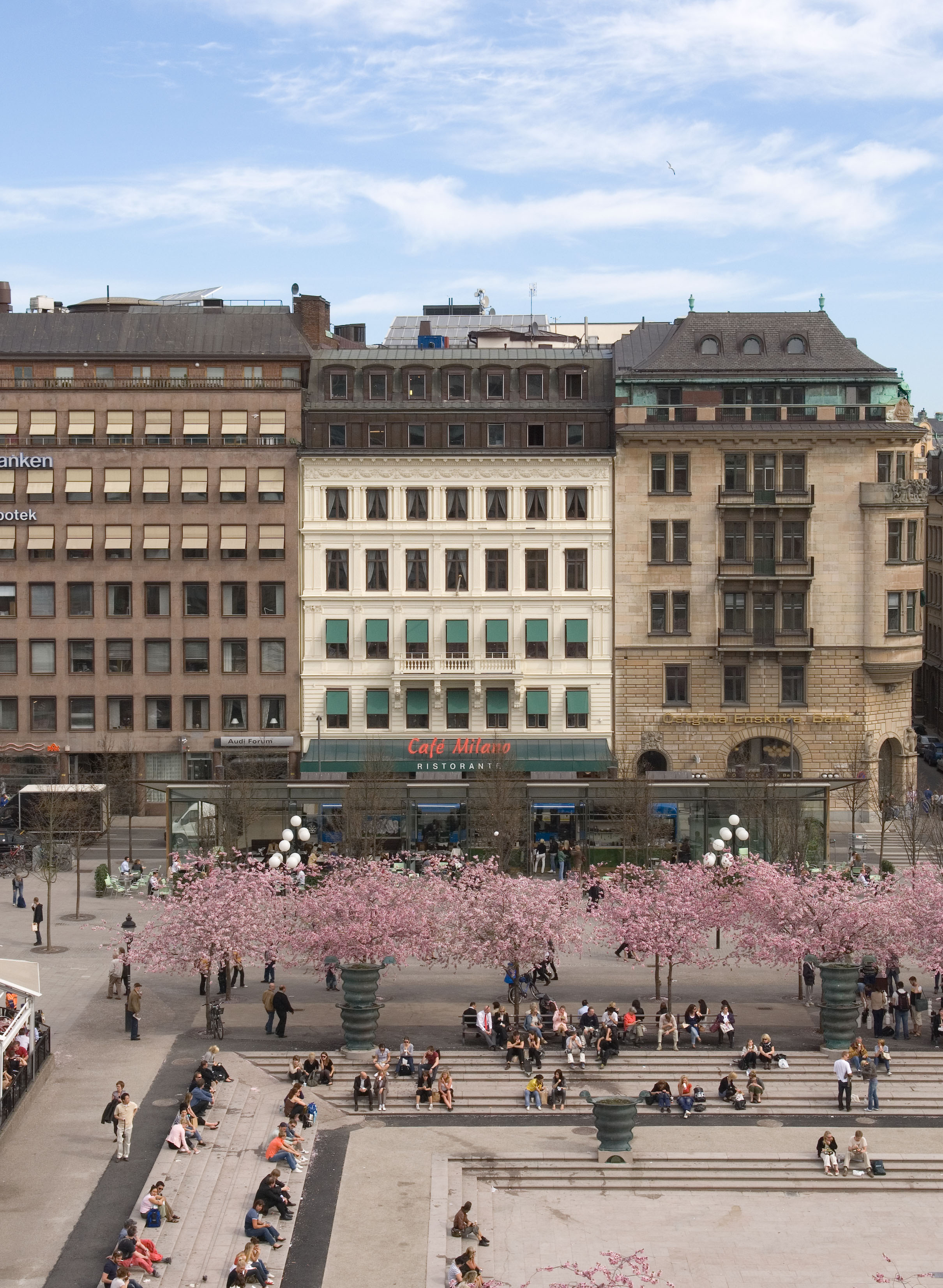
The Riksbankens Jubileumsfond Foundation in Stockholm, Sweden.

The Riksbankens Jubileumsfond Foundation is an independent foundation with the aim of promoting high scientific quality, encouraging cross-disciplinary research, and contributing to capacity building in Swedish research within the humanities and social sciences. The foundation supports research in the humanities and social sciences with a connection to Sweden. It was established in 1962 through a donation from the Central bank of Sweden, which wished to commemorate the bank’s 300th anniversary in 1968 while also supporting “a significant national cause.”

== History ==
Sweden has the world’s oldest central bank, and in preparation for its 300th anniversary in 1968, the bank wanted to support a significant national cause linked to science and research. As a result, the Riksbank made two donations: one to establish a prize in economic sciences in memory of Alfred Nobel, and another to support future research. On December 2, 1964, the Swedish Parliament decided to establish a foundation for this donation – the Riksbankens Jubileumsfond. In 1988, the foundation received new statutes, which made it an independent financial entity and clarified its mission.

=== Statutes ===
On January 1, 1988, Riksbankens Jubileumsfond received new statutes, which made the foundation an independent financial entity and clarified its purpose. According to the statutes, Riksbankens Jubileumsfond is to fund scientific research connected to Sweden, with a particular responsibility for:

- research that has difficulty obtaining other funding
- large and long-term projects
- new research initiatives requiring rapid and substantial support
- international collaboration within research
