= KVINFO =

Danish women's issues information center

Coordinates: 55°40′25.919″N 12°35′0.411″E

The Danish Center for Research on Women and Gender (KVINFO)
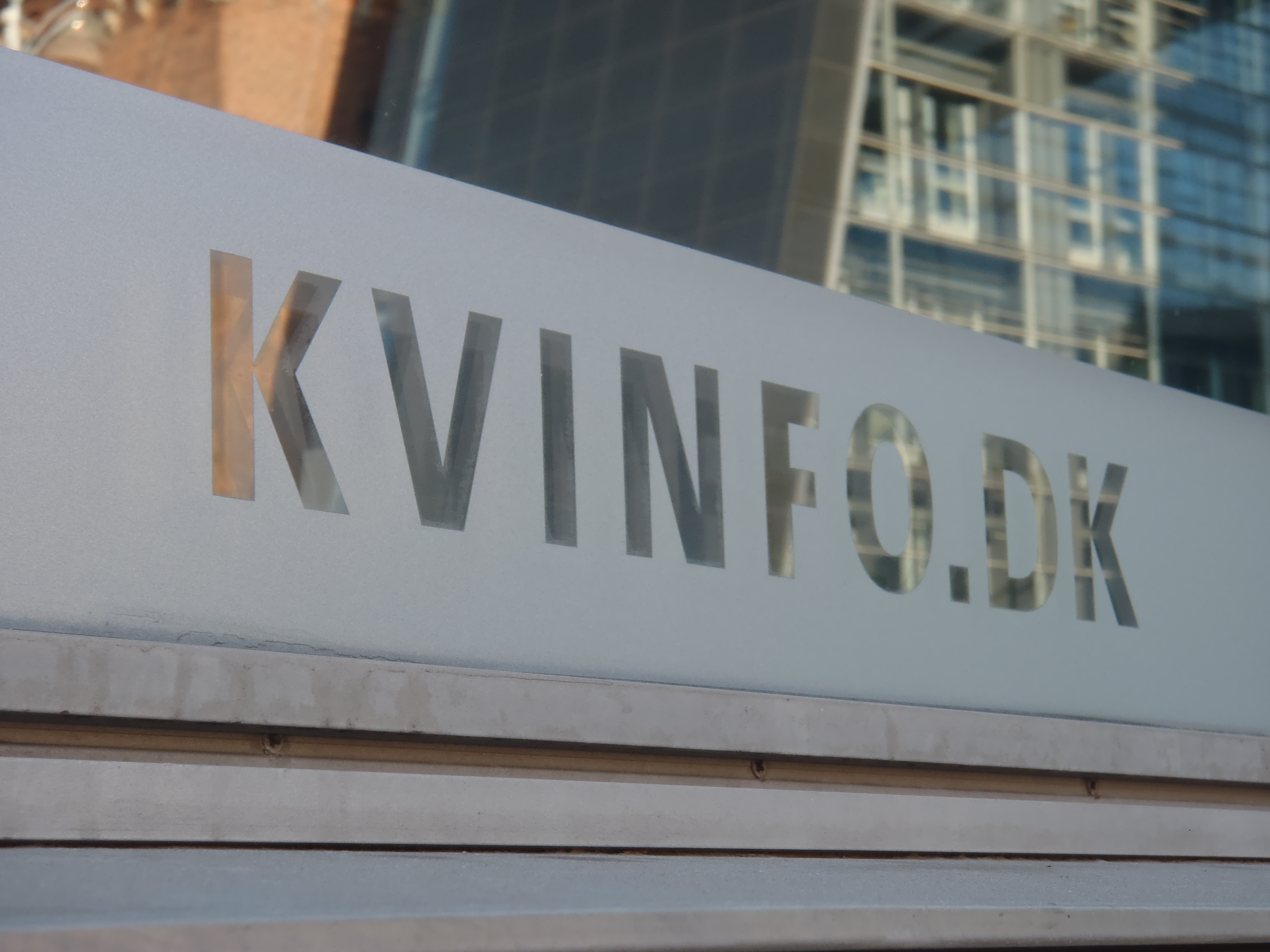
- KVINFO office in Copenhagen.
- Formation: 1964
- Founder: Nynne Koch
- Purpose: Documentation and information services
- Location: København K
- Official language: Danish
- Director: Nina Groes
- Board of directors: Christina Fiig, Sabrina Speiermann, Thomas Rasmussen (auxiliary), Dorthe Staunæs (chair), Gert Martin Hald, Lynn Roseberry (auxiliary), Mogens Blom, Robin May Schott (auxiliary), Marianne Bruun, Hanne Fokdal Barnekow (auxiliary), Michael Cutta-Schønberg, Birte Christensen-Dalsgaard (auxiliary), Tonny Skovgård Jensen (vice-chair), Ellen V. Knudsen (auxiliary), Jytte Nielsen, Anita Frank Goth (auxiliary)
- Parent organization: Ministry of Culture (Denmark)
- Affiliations: Danish library sector

The Danish Center for Research on Women and Gender (KVINFO) is a Danish information center about women's issues. It primarily aims to provide the general public with information about the results of women's studies and gender research undertaken in Denmark and internationally.

KVINFO's core resource is a library of more than 20,000 books, journals and political publications dealing with equal opportunity and women's issues. This library may be seen as an example of a broader, more holistic concept of a library because it actually carries out important functions related to modern information centers. For example, it edits a web magazine, an online Biographical Encyclopedia of Danish Women, a database of female professionals, and web stories on key periods in the history of Danish women. Furthermore, it coordinates special programs such as the mentor-network for women of all ethnic backgrounds living in Denmark, and the women's professional dialogues on human rights and equal opportunities in the Middle East.

== Name ==
KVINFO is an abbreviation of the Danish words køn, viden, information, and forskning, meaning gender, knowledge, information, and research, but is also meant to sound like a blend of the words kvinde and info ("woman" and "info" respectively).

== History ==
KVINFO's history goes back to 1964 when the founder Nynne Koch, who at the time worked at the Royal Danish Library in Copenhagen as a secretary, initiated a women's documentation service. She was allocated 15 minutes a day in which to register incoming books on women's issues in a card catalogue.

Such initiative allowed KVINFO to develop a unique classification and subject indexing system invented by Koch and developed over the years by special librarians. The system takes into account the particular needs of researchers specialized in women and gender studies in a way that posts in the catalogue are enriched with key words giving each post as many search entrances as possible.

By 1982, KVINFO was established as a four-year experiment funded by the Danish Ministry of Culture. Koch and her staff of volunteers moved to a new venue and expanded their activities. In 1987 the center became a self-governing institution.

Elisabeth Møller Jensen was the director of KVINFO from 1990 to 2014. During her directorship KVINFO's budget and staff increased threefold. The center's magazine has been redesigned and relaunched so that its circulation doubled. The organization's database project, the first online database of women experts in Europe, was also made available in the Internet.

Nina Groes took over the position of director on February 1, 2014.

Furthermore, the center has implemented information technology on all levels and functions as coordinator for the Danish Ministry of Culture's Cultural Network Denmark project.

== Documentation and information services ==
Although KVINFO has its roots in the Danish library sector, it has also contributed to bringing women's politics and women's research into the forefront of cultural debate in Scandinavia for the past eighteen years.

In addition to collecting and registering publications on women's studies, gender studies, men's studies, queer studies, gender equality, valid statistics, biographies, autobiographies, and so forth, KVINFO communicates with national and international audiences via several information services.

=== A web magazine for gender and culture ===
KVINFO's magazine, Forum, first paper edition appeared in 1982 and for the next ten years was the only Danish women's studies journal. In 1998 it became a web magazine in order to reach new groups of readers and place gender on their agenda.

Forum's main purpose is to increase the visibility of Danish women and of gender issues and to create links and contact to other women and gender researchers globally. It is mainly published in Danish.

=== A Biographical Encyclopedia of Danish women ===
Launched in 2003 under the Danish name Dansk kvindebiografisk leksikon, this encyclopaedia contains approximately 2,000 Danish women all pioneers within their fields such as education, nursing, science, music, etc., or central figures within the suffrage movement, politics, women's organizations, research, and business among others. This material is available to the general public free of charge on the Internet.

=== A database of Women Online ===
In 1995, KVINFO set up a database of women experts in Denmark called Women Online. This database provides easy access to biographical information on a large number of contemporary women who are opinion leaders, senior managers, politicians, researchers and experts within a wide range of subjects. It provides a broad selection of candidates for appointments in private and public office, for committees, tribunals, commissions and councils, and offers names for speakers, teachers, facilitators and consultants.

=== A website on Women's history ===
KVINFO launched this website in November 2001 and the idea behind it is to tell the story of Danish women's road to equal opportunities from 1850 to 1920. Documents on important landmarks such as the suffrage, women's access to education and employment, women's fight for independence and the debate on sexual morality are available in Danish in the Internet.

== Other activities ==
KVINFO is involved in many other projects. Besides arranging a wide range of lectures, seminars and cultural events, the center has strengthen its services coordinating programs supporting women's right in the Middle East and providing opportunities for immigrant women in Denmark.

=== Mentor network program for women immigrants ===
In 2001 the Danish women's movement in general, and KVINFO in particular, were criticized for letting down immigrant women.

By 2003 a mentor network was set up for the benefit of refugee and immigrant women living in Denmark. The idea was to match KVINFO's rich networks of strong, committed, well educated women with refugee and immigrant women.

Through one-on-one meetings of equals, women-mentors provide access to their professional networks and give appropriate advice regarding job applications, job interviews, workplace culture and reassessment of employment potential.

It has been estimated that more than 50 percent of all job openings in Denmark are filled via personal networks. Networks are essential to gain a foothold in Danish society. Women immigrants are matched with Danish mentors based on the educational background, profession and personal wishes.

By 2013, more than 3,300 women participants were already part of KVINFO's network, which is organized in four branches and in four different Danish cities.

=== Women in Dialogue in the Middle East ===
Created in 2006, KVINFO's Middle East initiative is the result of a desire to create a bridging frame to the bilateral partnership between Denmark and different Arab countries that currently focus on promoting gender equality and women's rights.

The program works by supporting proposals for capacity building of civil society organisations, especially women's organizations, in four strategic areas: legal change, women's participation in the public sphere, domestic violence, and research, documentation and information on gender related issues

In its initial phase KVINFO's initiative includes Morocco, Egypt, Palestine, Jordan, Lebanon, Syria and Yemen.

== See also ==
- Knowledge organization
- Timeline of women in Denmark
- List of libraries in Denmark
