= Esther Eillam =

Founder of Israeli feminist movement, gender researcher and activist (1939–2023)

Esther Eillam אסתר עילם
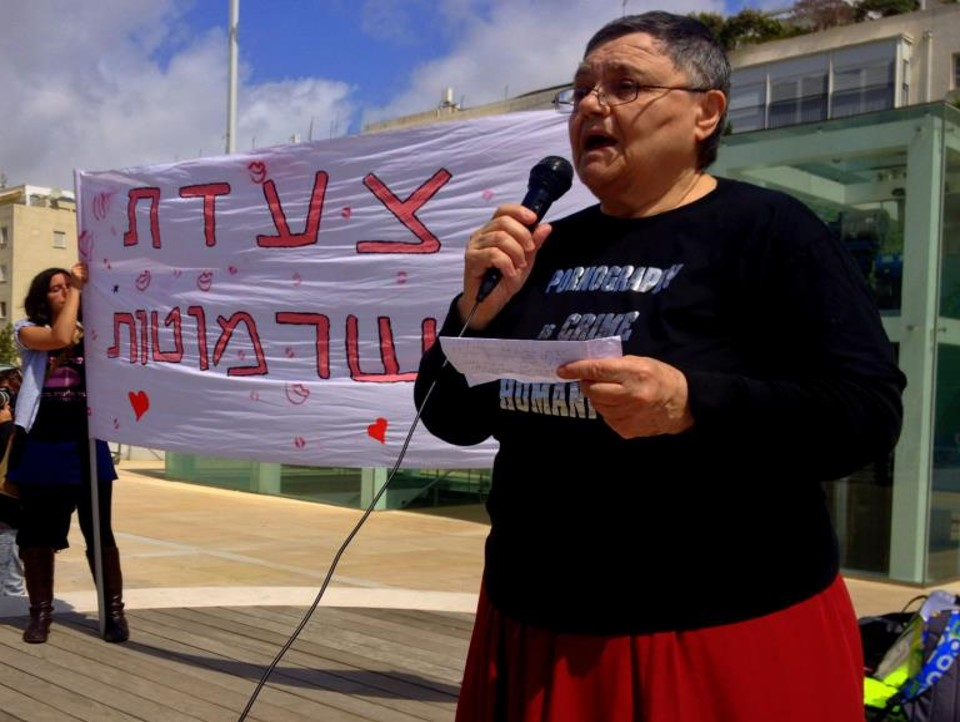
- Born: July 12, 1939; Tel Aviv, Mandatory Palestine
- Died: July 29, 2023 (aged 84)
- Education: Tel Aviv University
- Known for: "Founding Mother" of Israeli feminism
- Movement: Achoti - for Women in Israel

Esther Eillam (Hebrew: אסתר עילם; July 12, 1939 – July 29, 2023) was a central figure in Israeli feminism from its inception. Eillam's activism and her writings on feminism and social justice have garnered her awards and recognition, including an honorary doctorate from the Hebrew University of Jerusalem.

Eillam was an originator and founder of The Feminist Movement in Tel Aviv (1971), and one of the founders of the Israeli Center for Assistance to Victims of Sexual Assault, and one of the founders of the Mizrahi feminist organization, Ahoti - for Women in Israel (Ahoti/Achoti = [my] sister). She was active in various fields in Israeli feminism, including politics, culture, and education. She was the organizer of major events in Israel against sexual and gender violence, and was also active in the cause of peace.

== Background ==
Esther Saporta was born on July 12, 1939, in Tel Aviv, to parents of Sephardic origin from Saloniki, Greece. She was the second of the four children of Miriam (née De-Mayo) and Leon Saporta. Her siblings were Yaacov (1938–2014), Rachel (b. 1940), and Aliza (b. 1948). In 1964, she married her fellow student, Zohar Eillam, a doctor of psychology, inventor, author, and community organizer. She completed her BA in psychology and philosophy at the University of Tel Aviv in 1972.

In 1980, Eillam worked on her master's thesis in sociology at Tel Aviv University, researching gender stereotypes. Prior to this, she worked as a research assistant to professor Dafna Israeli, studying "Women Leaders of the Yishuv Era". She was also a researcher on the academic project, "Development Towns in the Periphery of Israel" (1978). In 2002, she completed her MA in philosophy, with a thesis investigating the possibility of "Creating Feminist Science: Feminist Philosophy of Science in Light of the 'Public-Private' Distinction".

According to Eillam, she was already a mother of two when she realized, in 1970, the extent to which every aspect of her life was affected by the fact that she was a woman in a patriarchal society. Following this realization, she began working for change regarding gender roles in society and its institutions, and she continued to promote this goal as an activist, working with various movements and organizations, as well as in Academia.

== Feminist Activism ==
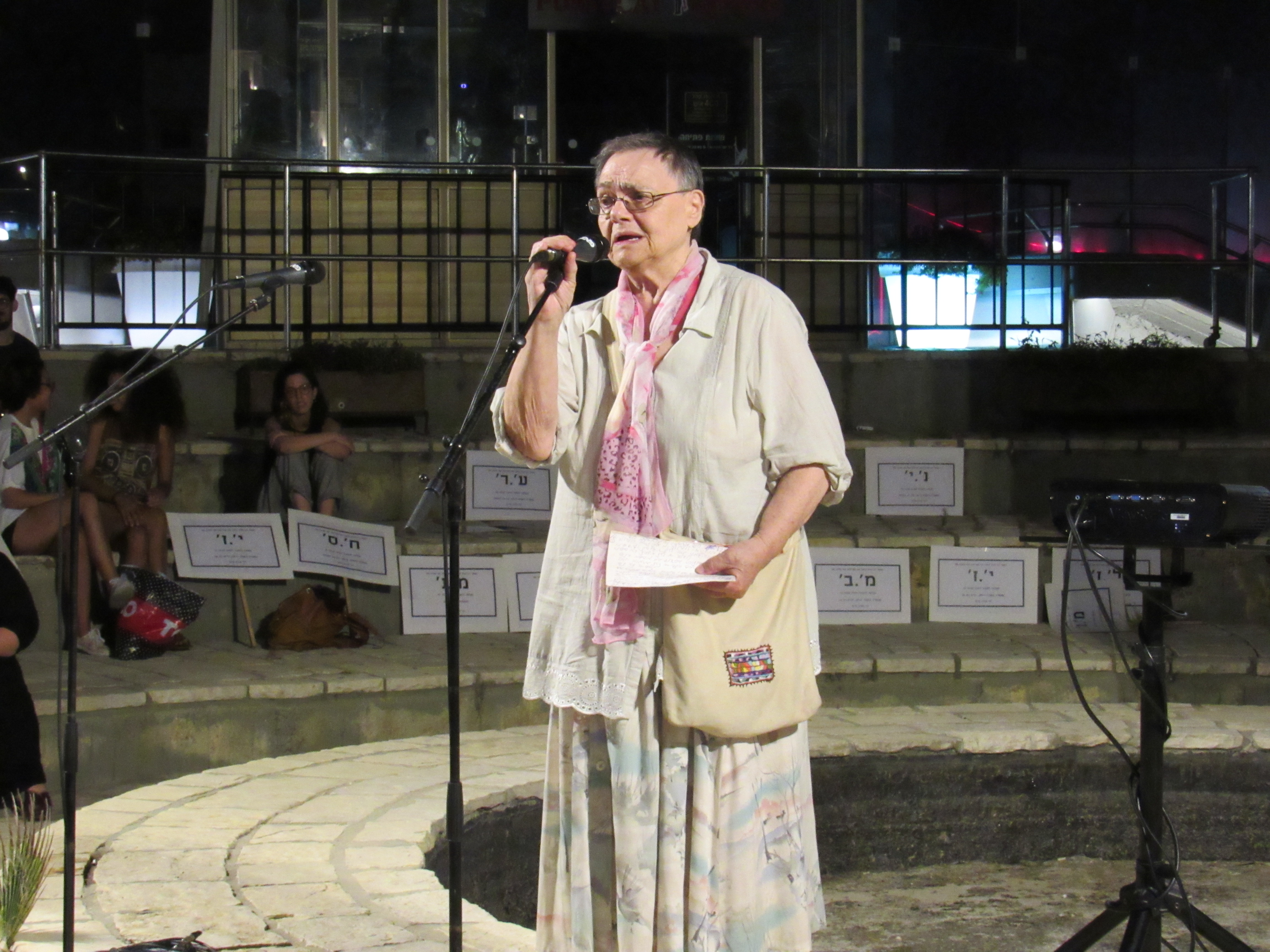
Esther Eillam at a memorial service and protest following the suicide of a sex worker (Tel Aviv, August 18, 2016)

Eillam was one of the "founding mothers" of feminism in Israel. In 1972, she founded the first feminist group in Tel Aviv, The Women's Liberation Group, which after three years became the nonprofit organization, "The Feminist Movement in Israel". She served as the chairperson of the organization until 1992. Her activities in the organization included creating and leading consciousness raising groups, leading educational initiatives, and PR. In addition, Eillam wrote and edited the group's newsletter, and represented the group as spokeswoman in the media and vis-a-vis other organizations and communities. She divided her time between educational work - which included lectures and training of high school and college students - and working to expand the feminist discourse and placing it on the public agenda. Among the political projects that Eillam led were campaigns to amend the abortion laws and the adoption of the Basic Law on Equal Rights for Women.

In 1975, Eillam was appointed by Prime Minister Yitzhak Rabin to the Namir Commission on the Status of Women in Israel. She participated in the "Women in Politics" and "Women in Education" teams. The final report released by the commission was presented to Prime Minister Menachem Begin in 1977, and included Eillam's research on gender stereotypes in elementary school textbooks, which she edited together with Michal Beller.

In 1977, Eillam was one of the founders of the Center for Assistance to Victims of Sexual Assault. She was the center's coordinator for the critical first four years of the center's existence, and continued serving as a volunteer at the center throughout the 1980s, working the hotline, training other volunteers, lecturing on sexual violence, as a spokeswoman, and assistance/accompanying for victims. Eillam was involved with documenting the history of the center, which remains the only one of its kind in Israel, and one of only a few in the world. Later, Eillam was also one of the founders of the hotline for male victims of sexual violence.

In the 1980s, Eillam continued to establish and participate in feminist and other initiatives for social justice. From 1979 to 1986, she was a member of the board of directors of the political party Meretz, headed by Shulamit Aloni. At the beginning of the decade, she worked as a community coordinator in the Neve Ofer neighborhood of southern Tel Aviv, and for a number of years was on the steering committee for the Shatil organization of the New Israel Fund. Between 1982 and 1987, she was one of the founders and organizers of the Women Against Violence Against Women group, which worked to eradicate pornography, and initiated field activities such as "Take Back the Night" marches as part of a global women's movement against violence and the Give a Ride to a Woman campaign, which promoted safety for women in transportation. In 1985 she organized the first demonstration in Israel against rape, as well as the first demonstration that took place in front of the Tel Aviv courthouse against the ruling in the group rape case at Kibbutz Shomrat. One of Eillam's professional achievements during this period was the establishment of a women's counseling center, with branches in Jerusalem and Ramat Gan, the first center of its kind in Israel, offering feminist psychotherapy.

Eillam was a charter member of the Israel Women's Network, a non-partisan lobby that works to advance the status of women in Israel by promoting equality through a range of projects and methods. She was a founding member and board member of the Women's Organizations Forum between 1984 and 1989, and established the Women's Guard, a self-defense organization for women living in northern Tel Aviv in 1985, during the time the infamous "Northern Tel Aviv rapist" was active in the area. Eillam became a peace activist after participating in the United Nations World Conference on Women in Nairobi in 1985, representing the Israeli Feminist Movement and Women's Network. In the late 1980s, Eillam was active in Women in Black and from that time and until her death was active in various peace and dialogue initiatives, especially with Palestinian women.

In 1990, Eillam initiated and participated in Operation Witnesses, conducted by a number of feminist organizations that gathered testimonies from victims of violence. That same year, Eillam participated in the first Israeli group for nonviolent communication, based on Marshall Rosenberg's method, as well as mediation courses and joint seminars that brought together Israeli Jews and Palestinians. Among her other activities during this time, Eillam was one of the founders and activists of the Coalition Against Trafficking in Women and the Tamar organization for women in prostitution. In the early 1990s, Eilam and an active sex worker jointly founded the organization "We Are Worthy," which worked to help prostitutes, and to create a change in the public attitude towards sex workers. The organization conducted field trips, seminars, and other educational activities, published a newsletter, and contributed to research and articles on the subject. Eillam was also one of the founders of the Women's Community School, which is committed to multiculturalism, and prepared a bibliography of feminist literature in Hebrew and English for the institution, as well as a curriculum for a course on violence against women.

In 2000, together with other feminist activists, among them Henriette Dahan Kalev, Vicki Shiran, Neta Amar and Shula Keshet, Eillam was one of the founders of the "Ahoti – for Women in Israel" movement (Ahoti/Achoti = [my] sister), focusing on promoting economic, social, political and cultural justice, and advancing the rights and status of women from non-hegemonic groups in Israel. Eillam was a member of the organization's executive committee and served on steering committees of various projects within the movement, such as "Women Building a Culture of Peace," "Developing a Feminist Economy," "Women's Leadership Course," "Against Trafficking of Women," "Women Writing Peace," "Fair Trade," "Welfare of Feminist Activists," "My Heart Is in the East Coalition," and more. She represents Ahoti in various organizational forums for women, as well as in the Knesset and in various civil and human rights frameworks. In the early to mid-2000s, Eillam's work on the prevention of sexual violence was worked into the school curriculum, a program implemented in schools by the psychological service of the Ministry of Education.

In May 2013, Eilam took part in the "Women in Yellow" initiative, a group of women who patrolled the streets of South Tel Aviv to ensure the safety of women in these dangerous neighborhoods. The initiative was established by Ortal Ben Dayan, the Mizrahi activist, as part of a series of activities designed to protect women from violence, including the distribution of pepper spray. In 2018 Eillam was active in Mizrachi Men and Women Against Expulsion, and was one of the main speakers at the massive demonstration in South Tel Aviv against the expulsion of African refugees by the Israeli government, in March 2018.

== Politics ==
Between 2008 and 2014, Eillam was a member of the municipal political party Ir Lekulanu (A city for all of us).

In September 2018, Eillam joined the municipal list Anachnu HaIr (We are the city) in the municipal elections. The party gained 5 seats on the city council, though Eillam was not among them.

== Research and Writing ==
All of Eillam's activities, within and outside of academic institutions, have included elements of feminist writing and research. Topics include politics, research methodology, analysis of texts from various disciplines from a feminist perspective, sexual violence, culture, and more. Eillam is critical of the hegemonic feminist discourse, which was imported to Israel from the United States in the context of cultural imperialism, and which she claimed perpetuates class stratification between women. An important feminist principle for Eillam, and of Mizrahi Feminism, was the recognition that it is not only the patriarchy and its institutions that position men as the holders of relative power over women, but that there are also relative differences in the power held by women and access to resources, based on ethnicity, class, and other intersections of identity and social position.

Within her academic pursuits, Eillam has worked to introduce feminism to the institutions, acquainting students and professors alike with the discipline. However, she was critical of the "academization" of feminist discourse, which according to her analysis appropriates feminism from the field, and contributes to the silencing of women who are members of marginal groups whose voices are less heard, though their activism is usually where feminism germinates.

== Death ==
Esther Eillam died on July 29, 2023, at the age of 84.

== Publications ==
=== Books ===
- Raped Women, Rape, and the Authorities in Israel; The Jerusalem Institution of Israel Studies, 1995. (Quoted in a Supreme Court verdict by the late Justice Mishal Heshin)
  - נאנסות, אונס והרשויות בישראל, הוצאת מכון ירושלים לחקר ישראל, 1994

=== Chapters in Books ===
- Eillam, Esther, 2013. Pornographization of the Holocaust –The Phenomenon and Lessons, In Flesh and Blood, Pornography and Prostitution in Israel. Eds., Herzog, Esther and Shadmi, Ariela. Am Oved pub. Tel Aviv, pp. 127–140.
- Eillam, Esther. 2011. Ritzpa Bat Aya – Contemplations on a Woman Heroine, In: A-Mythical – Social Justice and Gender in Jewish Sources. Eds., Henriette Dahan Kalev, Dafna Horev-Betzalel, Eli Bareket, Avigdor Shinan. Miskal - Yedioth Aharonoth Books and Chemed Books, Tel Aviv, Israel, pp. 157–64.
- Eillam, Esther. 2007. Hegemonic Use of Language among Women and its Political Implications, In Shlomith Lir, Ed., To My Sister, Mizrahi Feminist Politics, Bavel pub., Tel Aviv, Israel, pp. 197–205.
- Eillam, Esther. 2002. Esperanza', a short story. In: Azut-Metzah: Mizrahi Feminism, Ed. Tzah, Students Chapter for Social Justice, Winter, 2002. pp. 92–98.
- Eillam, Esther. 1994. Rape and Rape Survivors in Unique Groups in Israel: An Analysis and Comparison. In: Eds: Wozner, Y., Golan, M., Hovav, Crime and Social Work: Knowledge and Intervention. M. Ramot pub., Tel Aviv University. pp. 124–40.
- Eillam, Esther. 1991. "Rape and Rape Survivors in Israel," translated by Sharon Ne'eman, In: Eds: Barbara Swirksi and Marilyn P. Safir, Calling the Equality Bluff: Women in Israel. New York: Pergamon Press, pp. 312–18.
- Eillam Esther, Preliminary Report on Israel. In: Gail Peterson (editor), Margo St. James (Foreword) A Vindication of the Rights of Whores, Seattle, Washington, Seal Press, 1989, pp. 277–280.

=== Reports and Articles ===
- "בשירות הממסד", נגה, גיליון 30 (1996): 16–19
  ("In Service of the Establishment", Noga (Journal)
- "סטראוטיפים מיניים בספרי הלימוד בבית הספר היסודי", עם מיכל בלר, פרק בדו"ח הסופי לוועדת הממשלה למעמד האישה בישראל, 1978
  ("Gender Stereotypes in Elementary School Textbooks", a report created with Michal Beller, for the Commission on the Status of Women in Israel, as appointed by the Israeli government
- "התוצאות ההרסניות של זיהוי המושג 'מגדר' עם המושגים 'נשים' ו'פמיניזם'", האגודה הישראלית ללימודים פמיניסטיים ולחקר המגדר, 28 ביולי 2015
  ("The Destructive Results of Conflating the Term 'Gender' with 'Women' and 'Feminism'" - The Israeli Association for Feminist and Gender Studies)
- "פמיניסטית באקדמיה בשנות השבעים", מגדר - כתב עת למגדר ופמיניזם, דצמבר 2012
  ("A Feminist in Academe in the 1970s" - Migdar: A Journal of Gender and Feminism)
- העידן שמעבר ל'שיטת הרבעים' – השלב הבא בהתמודדות של פמיניסטיות בישראל עם אי השוויון בין נשים, מאמרה של עילם באתר הקשת
  ("The Era Beyond 'The Quarters System': The Next Step For Israeli Feminism in the Struggle for Equality" - HaKeshet)
- במציאות פמיניסטית אין צורך בביטחון, העוקץ, 8 ביולי 2012
  ("In a Feminist Reality There Is No Need for Security" - Ha'Oketz Magazine)
- מבט אישי על ארבעים שנה של מרכז הסיוע, 1202.org
  ("A Personal Look at Forty Years of the Sexual Assault Crisis Center" - 1202.org)
- גזענות – האומנם אפשר למגר אותה?, המטה למאבק בגזענות בישראל
  ("Racism - can it be eradicated?" - The Coalition Against Racism Israel)

== Awards and recognition ==
- 1995: Israel Women's Network’s Honorary Award
- 2000: Distinguished Citizen by ‘Ha-ir’, a weekly local journal
- 2001: ‘Dor-Shalom’ Award for volunteers.
- 2002: Honorary Ph.D. from the Hebrew University of Jerusalem
- 2004: The annual Joint-Zusman prize for volunteer work with the Sexual Assault Crisis Center
- 2006: Recommended candidate for Israel's Presidency as a part of a campaign for electing a woman president in Israel
- 2010: Distinguished Citizen of the Tel Aviv-Yafo Municipality, for her feminist life work
- 2011: Special honor for contribution to Mizrahi Culture – ‘My Heart is in the East’ coalition
- 2014: Rappaport prize for A Groundbreaking Woman in Israeli Society
