= Ortal Ben Dayan =

Jewelry designer, Mizrahi feminist, sociologist (born 1981)

Ortal Ben Dayan אורטל בן דיין
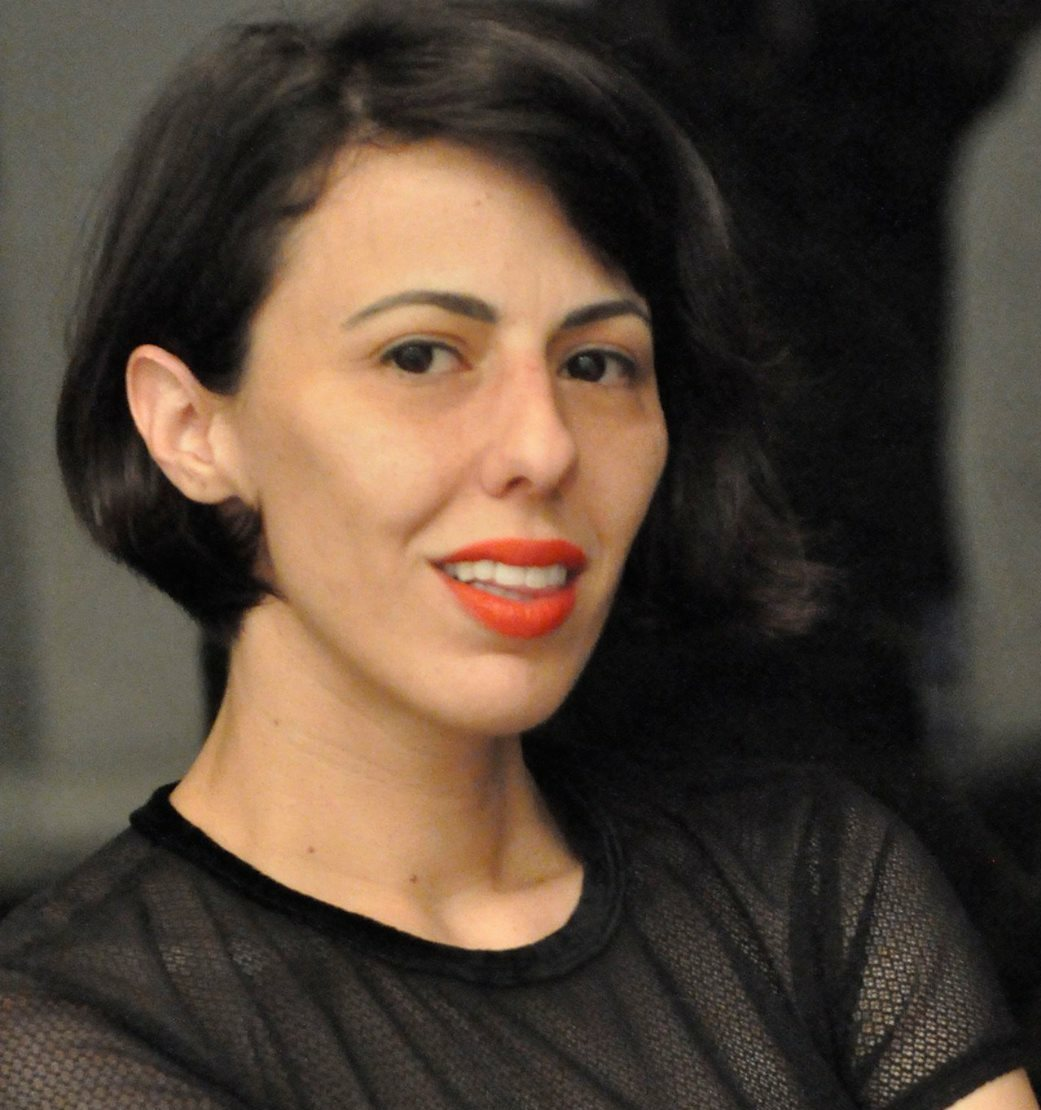
- Ben Dayan in 2017
- Born: July 12, 1981 (age 45)
- Education: Hebrew University of Jerusalem
- Occupations: Sociologist, publicist, fashion designer, Jewelry designer
- Known for: Activism, Mizrahi feminism
- Spouse: Hagai Mattar

Ortal Ben Dayan (Hebrew: אורטל בן דיין; born July 12, 1981) is an Israeli media personality, sociologist, Mizrahi feminist activist, blogger, and fashion and jewelry designer.

== Early life and education ==
Ben Dayan was born in Kiryat Shmona on July 12, 1981, to a family of Moroccan extraction. Her parents divorced when she was 12 years old, and she moved in with her grandmother when she was 15.

After being expelled from Danzinger High School in Kiryat Shmona, Ben Dayan began attending the nearby kibbutz high school in Kfar Blum. The experience of being a Mizrahi "townie" in this more privileged Ashkenazi setting was of seminal importance for her later career and activism. During her compulsory military service, Ben Dayan was a soldier-teacher, beginning her social activism by working with youth groups from the geographic periphery of Israel.

In 2006, Ben Dayan completed her BA in international relations and sociology, and in 2010 she completed her MA in sociology and anthropology, both summa cum laude. She caught the public eye when she sued the Hebrew University of Jerusalem for sexual harassment, a pivotal case that changed how universities in Israel manage relationships between faculty and students, as well as the handling of complaints regarding sexual misconduct by faculty.

== Activism ==
=== Mizrahi feminism and social justice work ===
Ben Dayan describes her activism as intersectional. She is active in many areas involving social justice, feminism and gender, racism and Mizrahi social status, as well as issues of class and the social and geographic periphery, including the "fast-tracking" of Mizrahi youth to trade schools and blue collar professions. She traces her Mizrahi and gender awareness back to the racism she experienced in high school, which she describes as acutely gendered, for example, when she was called a "freha" (a derogatory term for Mizrahi women) by her schoolmates in the kibbutz school. While studying at the Hebrew University of Jerusalem, Ben Dayan was involved with the "Landa program" for social involvement, and was a community coordinator for the "Alon" NGO in the Gilo settlement, a Jewish neighborhood in East Jerusalem, responsible for reducing gaps in education.

Afterwards, she became active in the Mizrahi Democratic Rainbow Coalition, where she was a member of the executive committee and spokeswoman during 2009–2010. In 2010 she was also the academic coordinator for Naamat, where she conducted seminars on women in the workforce. Also in 2010, she began working for the Mizrahi feminist organization Achoti – for Women in Israel, where she ran an anti-racism project and conducted a writing program called "Women Create a Language of Peace", in which women from various marginalized groups participated, including Mizrahi women, Palestinian women, women from the former Soviet Union, and others. The project culminated in the publication of a book compiling the women's writings.

In 2012–2013, Ben Dayan wrote reports for the Coalition for Equal Allocation of Resources for Mizrahi Culture, on behalf of the coalition "Libi BaMizrah" (My Heart is in the East). Among these was a multi-year analysis of state cultural budgets provided to various groups.

Ben Dayan has been outspoken on multiple issues in the Israeli public eye – often receiving scathing responses from both right and left. These include anti-homophobia campaigns that replace anti-gay stereotypes with anti-woman and anti-Mizrahi ones; she published a photo of herself holding a book on Israeli art, but only those pages dealing with Mizrahi artists (over 50% of the Jewish population of Israel) – which was 6 out of 200 – creating a dramatic effect of the thin group of pages held, while the heavy bulk of the book is pulled down by gravity; she has been outspoken about the campaign to exonerate Roman Zadorov of the murder of Tair Rada, calling out the gendered and ethnic aspects of trying to accuse her 13-year-old friends of the murder to set him free; and she drew especially sharp criticism from "her own camp" when she published an article stating that African refugees would not be sent to their deaths if the government deportation plan would be implemented.

=== Feminist activism in South Tel Aviv ===
After Ben Dayan opened a vintage fashion store in the Tel Aviv neighborhood of Neve Sha'anan in 2013, she was exposed to the issue of the personal security of women in the area. She began to work on their behalf, including raising money for pepper spray, and the establishment of a permanent distribution station in her shop. She also organized the "Women in Yellow" patrol, which took its name from the Indian organization Gulabi Gang, or "Women in Pink", who patrol their areas with sticks and confront abusive and violent men. During 2014–2015, Women in Yellow conducted nightly patrols in the streets of South Tel Aviv to establish a presence and prevent cases of violence, to assist women experiencing violence, and to draw official attention to the harsh conditions in the region that contribute to increased violence, including lack of lighting and a lack of police presence and responsiveness. This work put Ben Dayan on the list of "50 Women for Women" compiled by the online magazine Saloona.

=== Online activism ===
Since 2008, Ben Dayan has published blogs and articles in online newspapers, including Eretz HaEmori, Saloona, Ha'Oketz, and more. She uses Facebook to disseminate social and political ideas to a wide audience. Ben Dayan is considered to be a social media influencer. In 2012 she published a Facebook status asking: "A survey for Shabbat: What is Ashkenazi in your eyes?", with the purpose of underscoring the usually transparent behavior and cultural markers of the hegemonic social group. The status drew over 21,000 responses and caused a furor in the printed press, on television and on the radio. The thread continues to be active as of February 2019, seven years since its publication. Since then, Ben Dayan has been using the Facebook platform to discuss Mizrahi and feminist issues, especially in the face of what she calls "the Ashkenazi Left", and to discuss issues that face the pre-gentrification residents of southern Tel Aviv – most of whom are of Mizrahi origin, and other issues relating to Mizrahim in Israeli society, from the allocation of resources and educational and professional channeling, to raising issues such as the use of the words 'ars' and 'freha' (derogatory words used for Mizrahi men and women respectively, but generally denied to have racist overtones) as racist phenomena.

In 2011, she co-authored with activist Assaf Kintzer the blog "Hatzatetet" (the "Quotery") an archival site of racist and sexist quotes by Israeli leaders of the founding generation and famous Zionist thinkers. In the years 2012–2013, she also ran the personal political blog "An Axe to Grind", in which she wrote extensively on some of the explosive issues that took place on Facebook, including the storm surrounding the claim that the work of post-Soviet artist Zoya Cherkassky's portrayal of Mizrahim is racist, as well as criticism of leading left wing Ashkenazi journalists and activists, such as Yossi Gurevitch, Amir Shibi, and Dror Feuer.

=== Protests and arrests ===
Neve Sha'anan, Tel Aviv

On August 12, 2013, Ben Dayan was arrested after she refused to identify herself to a police officer. She was sitting at the Albi café in Neve Sha'anan in Tel Aviv when a Border Police car arrived at the scene, and the policemen demanded that members of a Palestinian family sitting outside the café approach the car and identify themselves. Ben Dayan went up to one of the officers and told him that she knows the family, when the other policeman shouted at her "you asshole leftist". Ben Dayan demanded that he identify himself (his name badge was hidden).

In response, the policeman got out of the car and demanded that Ben Dayan present her identification papers, and after she refused, the police arrested her. She was handcuffed by both wrists and ankles, and spent the night in Neve Tirtza Women's Prison. The next day, Judge Shamai Becker of the Magistrate's Court determined that she should rightly be released, but ruled that "purely for the sake of politeness" Ben Dayan should identify herself. She refused to do so, and appealed the decision in the District Court. Following a personal request from the appellate judge, she agreed to provide her identification details and was released to her home.

Following her release, Ben Dayan shared a status posted on Facebook by the arresting officer, Melvin Ben Sheshet, which included blatant racist comments about Arabs. The Border Police, who had previously claimed that Ben Dayan was the one who cursed the policemen, and had denied that their officers called her an "asshole" or attacked her ostensible political camp, decided to immediately terminate Ben Sheshet's service. They issued a statement saying that "the corps views with severity such behavior that is blatantly contrary to the values that every police officer is required to adhere to, and which certainly has no place in the Israel Police."

Zion Square, Jerusalem

Towards the end of 2014, Ben Dayan arrived at Zion Square in Jerusalem to join with activists from the group "Jerusalem without Racism" at a demonstration staged by Lehava, a religious far-right group targeting non-Jewish presence in Israel, and the assimilation of Jews into non-Jewish communities (in particular, through intermarriage). A young man at the protest began yelling at Ben Dayan, "Neo-Nazi" and "sharmuta" (whore or slut). Ben Dayan quickly slapped him.

A Lehava activist named Avishai Bar Yishai then approached Ben Dayan and asked her if she would also like to slap him, noting that he was older and bigger than the young man. She retorted that she would slap anyone who called her a whore; Bar Yishai immediately called her "sharmuta", upon which Ben Dayan slapped him, too. Policemen who were nearby separated the two, arresting Ben Dayan for assault and Bar Yishai for insulting a public servant. Both were released on bail.

In July 2016, two years after the incident, an indictment was filed against Ben Dayan for assault. After a short time, the indictment was canceled.

=== Lectures ===
Ben Dayan is a prolific lecturer on feminism, gender, ethnicity, Mizrahi topics, activism, and the sociology of Israel. Among her more noted events: A series of lectures in 2017 on the subject of "The Cultural Property Rights of Indigenous Peoples", based on an article she previously published in Domus magazine; a 2016 panel on "Feminism and Judaism", with Rabbi Oury Cherki; lectures on Mizrahi identity at the Suzanne Dellal Center; and a lecture series in 2012 on "Art & Racism", following her article about the public fracas caused by her accusation that the art of Zoya Cherkassky is racist, "Don't Post Art to Facebook, all the 'Arsim' Will Come".

== Legal issues ==
=== Sexual harassment at the Hebrew University of Jerusalem ===
In May 2008, when Ben Dayan was a graduate student at the Hebrew University of Jerusalem, she published an article in the online magazine "Ha'oketz" entitled "'A' from the Sociology Department", in which she described a romantic relationship she had with one of her professors, Gideon Aran, during her undergraduate studies, and the harassment and abuse he perpetrated upon her after the relationship ended, on both sexual and racist bases. (Note: The initial of the first name is commonly used in Israeli media in sex crime cases, because the identity of the victim is protected by law. In the infamous case against Israeli President Moshe Katsav, the victim was Aleph ("A"), and both Ben Dayan and Aran share the letter Aleph in their names. Her use of the letter Aleph to refer to her harasser is a form of irony.) This was the first publicized accusation of its kind, and the article generated media tumult, and subsequently, additional complaints were filed against other faculty members, including several complaints against Professor Eyal Ben-Ari. Following these complaints, and the process that she initiated against Aran, the university was forced to deal with the issue of relations between faculty and students, a subject for which there had been until then no clear official policy.

In February 2009, the university filed a disciplinary complaint against Aran for "faculty misconduct". In 2011, all the parties reached an agreement through mediation, according to which Aran admitted to the attacks against Ben Dayan, received a reprimand, was expelled from service on university committees, paid a fine and apologized to Ben Dayan. The university, without any admission of fault, paid Ben Dayan compensation of 38,000 Shekels (approximately US$10,000). In addition, as part of the agreement, the university officially recognized Ben Dayan's claims as factual, and stated that following the proceedings initiated by Ben Dayan, the university would introduce "regulatory changes in respect to what is permitted and prohibited regarding relationship between students and faculty, in which academic authority is involved", and undertook to apply "institutional measures to improve the process of handling complaints by students, to prevent harm to the complainants' status, and to ensure for them a supportive learning environment."

The changes made by the Hebrew University were followed by other universities throughout Israel, and subsequently, Ben Dayan was chosen by The City newspaper as one of the fifty most influential people on education in Israel (No. 39) for 2009. Following the episode with Aran and Ben-Ari, the number of complaints relating to sexual misconduct by faculty at the Hebrew University doubled, and all sexual/romantic relationships between students and faculty in a position of authority over them were prohibited.

=== Lawsuit against Irit Linur ===
After the mediation agreement between Ben Dayan and the Hebrew University was publicized in the media in 2011, the matter was discussed on the talk radio show "Last Word" on the popular Army Radio station (Galatz), hosted by Kobi Ariely and Irit Linur. Linur called Ben Dayan "a whore" who "had an affair with her married professor", in additional to other similar statements, such as claiming that Ben Dayan did "ugly things". A week later, Linur apologized on the air, but emphasized that she is only apologizing for using the word "whore" (in Hebrew, zonah). Meanwhile, the entire affair gained traction in the media, and Yair Lapid (one of Israel's most popular columnists, and later head of a political party and government minister) wrote in his weekly column that Ben Dayan had an affair with a married man, based on what Linur had said. Consequently, Ben Dayan filed a lawsuit against Linur, the Army Radio and the Israel Ministry of Defense for defamation, based on the offensive characterizations of her, as well as the accusations that Aran was married at the time of their relationship, which was untrue. The parties reached a settlement agreement, according to which the Army Radio issued an apology to Ben Dayan with no admission of guilt, and paid her compensation in the sum of 38,000 Shekels (approximately US$10,000).

In 2014, Ben Dayan and Linur had a reconciliation meeting. Linur apologized in person, and then encouraged the public to vote for Ben Dayan while she competed on the "Big Brother" reality television series.

=== Amir Hetsroni's lawsuit ===
In September 2013, Ben Dayan wrote a Facebook post addressed to Amir Hetsroni, a controversial media and academic figure. The background was the Tel Aviv SlutWalk, after which Hetsroni published disparaging remarks about participants, claiming they were "too ugly to rape". Ben Dayan's post intimated the Hetroni pays for sex services in the brothels of South Tel Aviv, where she had seen him late at night. Hetsroni sued Ben Dayan for defamation, which turned into a widely covered media event. Eventually, Hetsroni and Ben Dayan reached an out-of-court settlement, in which Ben Dayan stated that she had been mistaken, and was informed that Hetsroni owned property in the area, which is why he was there. Ben Dayan paid Hetsroni a nominal amount in damages. Later, the two held a public reconciliation. Ben Dayan objected to Hetsroni's termination from Ariel University later that year for unrelated controversial statements.

== In the media ==
=== News ===
Ben Dayan is a regular contributor to various news publications, including +972 Magazine, At ("You" (f.) – אַתְּ) women's magazine, Ma'ariv, and more. She has interviewed some of the leading women in Israeli public life, including MP Merav Michaeli, Minister of Justice Ayelet Shaked, Ruth Dayan and MP Tzipi Hotovely, who also served as Deputy Minister for Foreign Affairs. She also writes about subjects such as feminism, politics and culture. From 2014 to 2015, Ben Dayan had a weekly column in the printed and online newspaper, Maariv.

=== Television and radio ===
Ben Dayan is frequently invited as a guest on talk shows and interview programs, and also serves as a panelist on programs on current events, culture, and entertainment. She appeared on such programs Keren Neubach daily talk show, Gal Uchovsky's "Arena", a cultural analysis panel show, and was a regular panelist on the political analysis show "The Patriots" with Erel Segal.

In 2014, Ben Dayan participated in season 6 of the Israeli franchise of the reality series Big Brother. She was the second resident of the Big Brother house to be voted off by the viewers.

On the program, Ben Dayan and fellow resident Eldad Gal-Ed, an ideological settler, developed a special tension, partly because of their disparate political views. Gal-Ed's friend Martine Solel, nicknamed Ben Dayan "Shontal", a derogatory ethnic poke at her first name "Ortal", which is most commonly adopted by Israelis of Moroccan extraction. Things came to a head when during an argument that began when Gal-Ed tried to force his way past Ben Dayan to get into the shower, and Ben Dayan, in protest, took off her top and defied him to try and pass her in that state. The incident created a public and media frenzy, which included recognition of her action as a deliberate feminist act, while on the other hand claims were heard that it was an act of harassment and provocation. A complaint was filed against franchisor Keshet Media Group with the Ombudsman of the Television and Radio Authority, who investigated the matter, and resolved that Keshet should not have broadcast the incident, and that their goal was "strictly voyeuristic." [43] Ben Dayan responded to the accusations against her by saying to Big Brother on the air:

You know, we do not live in an egalitarian world between men and women ... What I did could be seen as 'corrective harassment.' Anyone who wants to complain about me is welcome to. 99 percent of sexual violence offenses are committed by men. It isn't a comparable situation, because we do not live in a society where women sexually threaten men, but on the contrary, women are seen as a site of sexuality that can be invaded at any time, so that when a man does it excessively, it is merely an extension of an already-existing situation. But perhaps this is just on a philosophical level.

— Big Brother (Israel), Keshet Communications, May 28, 2014

The incident became one of the most talked-about in the history of Big Brother (Israel). Ben Dayan has been invited back to the Big Brother house, once to confront another right-wing resident of the house, and her jewelry was featured on the show at the opening of Big Brother VIP edition at the start of 2019.

Ben Dayan hosted a radio show "Talking to the Wall" on Army Radio in 2013.

== Fashion ==
In 2013, Ben Dayan opened a vintage fashion store in South Tel Aviv, from which she also sold clothing of her own design, such as galabiyas. In 2016 she launched a line of jewelry, which was featured in fashion shoots for leading fashion and women's magazines and other publications in Israel, including At, LaIsha, Ha'aretz, Ma'ariv, and more. In 2018, she closed her vintage shop, and began dedicating herself exclusively to the design, manufacture and sale of her original jewelry.

Ben Dayan is a fashion icon and analyst, known especially for the connection she creates between fashion and feminism and Mizrahi politics. The connection is expressed, for example, by the name she chose for her vintage shop and its character, as can be seen in the clothing and jewelry she designs – which she describes as related to her identity as a Mizrahi from the geographical periphery. The store, which also serves as a kind of community headquarters, is simply named after her – "Ortal Fashion" – intentionally, because of the stereotyped link between the name, which is identified as the name of a Moroccan woman and the sale of clothing, also a stereotypical occupation, as Ben Dayan wrote in her article "'A' from the Sociology Department":

The name that Professor A said is problematic, because 'it doesn't feel right on the tongue', and 'of course, as the joke goes, even if your name is Bill Gates, if you name your daughter Ortal, you are limiting her occupational possibilities to running a bodega or a clothing store.' I understood then that excellence in academic pursuits, being top-rated, is something that is identified with the AE club (Ashkenazi Elite), and I simply am not a member of that club.

— 'A' from the Sociology Department

The ethno-cultural context is also expressed in her designs themselves, which contain cultural elements, without an imitating folkloristic aesthetics.

== Personal life ==
At the age of 26 Ben Dayan was married for about a year. In June 2016, she married journalist and former conscientious objector Hagai Mattar. As of February 2019, the couple is expecting their first child. Ben Dayan and Mattar were selected as one of Time Out Tel Aviv's "Power Couples" in August 2017. Ben Dayan became a vegan after participating in the Big Brother television series in 2014 alongside major Israeli animal rights activist Tal Gilboa.
