= Ketzia Alon =

Israeli academic and Mizrahi feminist

Ketzia Alon קציעה אלון
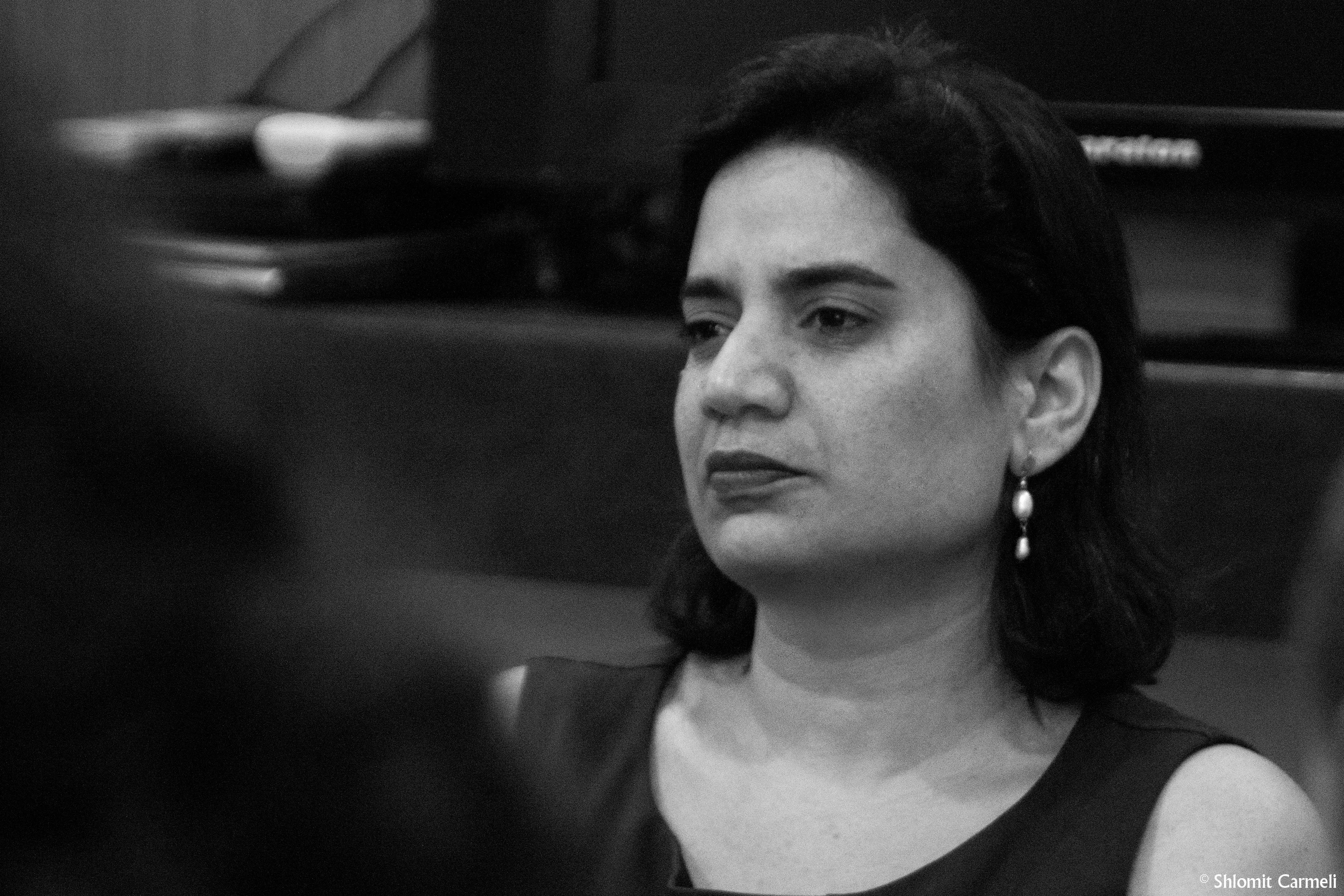
- Born: 1971 (age 54–55)
- Occupations: Academic, Mizrahi feminist

Ketzia Alon (Hebrew: קציעה עלון; born in 1971) is an Israeli academic, social activist, Mizrahi feminist, art curator and critic, and owner of Gama Publishing. She is one of the founders of the Ahoti – for Women in Israel movement.

Alon was on the editorial board of the literary journal "Criticism and Review", and was head of the Gender Studies program at Beit Berl College.

In 2017, Alon received the Prime Minister's Prize for Hebrew Literary Works.

== Biography ==
Alon was born in Jerusalem in 1971. She completed her undergraduate degree in art history and communications at the Hebrew University. Her MA focused on Jewish-Christian relations, and her PhD was in Hebrew literature. In her academic career, Alon teaches or has taught at the Open University, at Ben Gurion University, and was the head of the Gender Studies department at Beit Berl College. Alon is a founding activist of the Mizrahi feminist movement, which found its beginnings at the 10th Feminist Conference 1994, in Givat Haviva, at which a major confrontation between Mizrahi and Ashkenazi feminists led to a final rift in the feminist movement. Alon then participated in founding the Mizrahi movement, Ahoti – for Women in Israel.

== Writing ==
Alon's writing focuses on the concept of Mizrahim. She presents the social, cultural and political meanings of Mizrahi-ness through presentation of poetry, art and essays by Mizrahi Jews, which she analyzes and expands upon. She is particularly interested in the intersection of feminism and Mizrahi-ness, which is expounded in the book she wrote with Shula Keshet, Breaking Walls. In her research, Alon compares and contrasts the dichotomy of Ashkenazi/Mizrahi, in the past and present, with other socio-political dichotomies in Israel, such as Jews and Arabs, religious and secular, political left and right, rich and poor, men and women. Alon points out the way that the concept of the Mizrahi creates discomfort, because it undermines categories of identity such as Jews and Arabs, given that the Mizrahi is most often an Arab Jew. Alon says that she cannot accept the social polarization that has formed in Israeli society around Ashkenazi and Mizrahi identities, claiming that Mizrahi-ness refuses to remain at a defined and separate pole, much as she denied the attempt to separate men and women in this manner.

== Select works ==
Alon has published ten books, and many articles:

- אמנות הסימפטום: קריאות ביצירותיו של אהרן אפלפלד / יוחאי אופנהיימר, קציעה עלון. הוצאת גמא, 2014 – Omanut ha-simpṭom : ḳeriʼot bi-yetsirotaṿ shel Aharon Apelfeld; The art of symptoms : reading Aharon Appelfeld's fiction
- אפשרות שלישית לשירה: עיונים בפואטיקה מזרחית / קציעה עלון. הוצאת הקיבוץ המאוחד, 2011 – Efsharut shelishit le-shirah : ʻiyunim be-poʼeṭiḳah Mizraḥit
- שושנת המרי השחורה: קריאות בשירה מזרחית / קציעה עלון. משרד הביטחון – ההוצאה לאור, 2014 – Shoshanat ha-meri ha-sheḥorah : ḳeriʼot be-shirah mizraḥit
- שוברות קירות: אמניות מזרחיות עכשוויות בישראל / קציעה עלון, שולה קשת. ארגון אחותי, 2013 – Shovrot ḳirot : omaniyot Mizraḥiyot ʻakhshaṿiyot be-Yiśraʼel
- אנא מן אלמגרב: קובץ מאמרים על היצירה הפואטית של ארז ביטון / קציעה עלון, יוחאי אופנהיימר. הוצאת גמא והוצאת הקיבוץ המאוחד, 2014 – Ana min al-Magreb : ḳeriʼot be-shirat Erez Biṭon
- עדות היופי וחוקת הזמן, מאמרים על אמירה הס / קציעה עלון. הוצאת גמא, 2016 – ʻEdut ha-yofi ṿe-ḥuḳat ha-zeman : ʻal shiratah shel Amirah Hes: maʼamrim ṿe-siḥot; Testament of beauty and laws of time : discussing Amira Hess's poetry : essays and talks
- אופ- פוטו, אוסף הצד האחורי של הצילום הישראלי / קציעה עלון. הוצאת גמא, 2017 – Op foṭo : ha-tsad ha-aḥori shel ha-tsilum ha-Yiśreʼeli; Photo opp : The other side of Israeli photography
- לשכון בתוך מילה: הרהורים על זהות מזרחית / קציעה עלון. הוצאת גמא, 2015 – Li-shekhon be-tokh milah : hirhurim ʻal zehut mizraḥit; To dwell in a word
