= Vicki Knafo =

Israeli social activist

Vicki Knafo ויקי קנפו
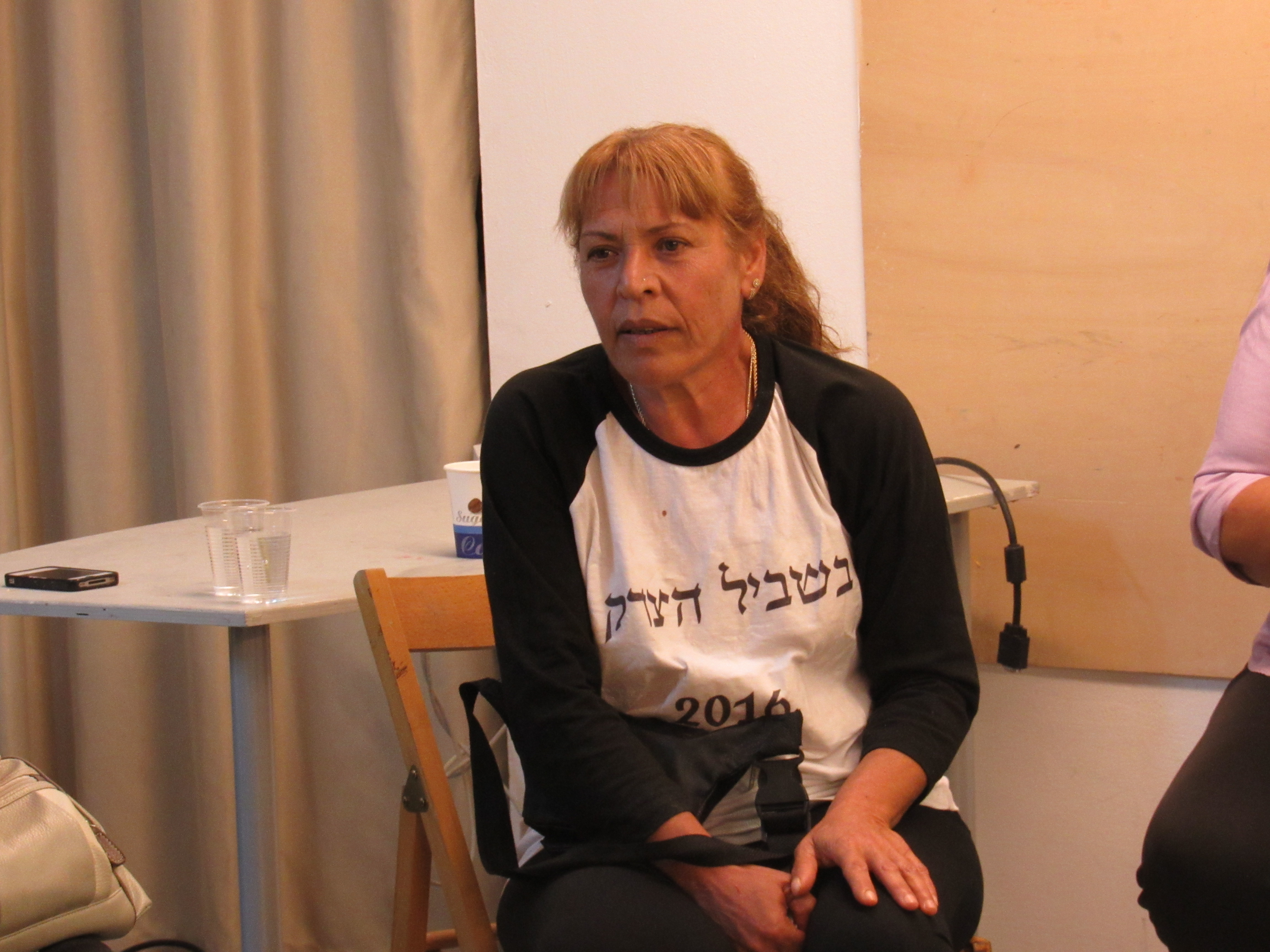
- Born: 1960 (age 65–66)
- Occupation: Social activist

Vicki Knafo (Hebrew: ויקי קנפו; born 1960) is an Israeli social activist. She led the 2003 single-mothers struggle against austerity decrees limiting child allotments, a policy initiated by then-finance minister Binyamin Netanyahu as part of a program to cut government spending in the areas of welfare and aid, which was aimed primarily at income support and other programs aimed at marginalized sectors of the population, such as single mothers.

== The protest ==
On July 2, 2003, Knafo set out on a march from her home in the southern town of Mitzpe Ramon to the Ministry of Finance in Jerusalem. She walked along main and side roads carrying an Israeli flag. The march, which was about 205 kilometres (127 mi), took her a week. Along the way, she was joined by other single mothers and families, and was followed closely by the media, becoming a national "cause célèbre". When she arrived in Jerusalem, she joined the single-mothers protest encampment which was set up in front of the government offices, bringing major media attention to the mothers and families there.

Netanyahu's initial response to Knafo was: "Go to work! If you have the ability to march, you can go to work".

Following Knafo's march, other groups joined the expanding protest, including representatives of disability rights groups and the elderly. The media interest in Knafo continues, and she was interviewed and quoted frequently. The struggle for which she became a symbol was sometimes called "The July Revolution" or "Revolt of the Poor". Along her way, Knafo garnered support from various social activism and interest groups, among them Ahoti, the Mizrahi feminist movement, New Israel Fund, and more. Several Mizrahi feminist from Ahoti joined specifically to protect Knafo from the police, who tried several times to curtail her march.

Increasing public pressure was applied to Netanyahu to change his plan. He made some changes, which Knafo and other protesters called "cosmetic", and rejected.

In August, Knafo and several other leaders of "the mothers' movement" went on a hunger strike. Knafo fasted for 18 days, before she agreed to break her strike in the President's residence, at his request, as he voiced support and appreciation for her struggle. However, as the protest continued, the residents in the protest encampment began experiencing divisiveness. The Jerusalem group of single mothers wanted to escalate the struggle, and create disruption by blocking roads and the like, while Knafo and Ilana Azoulay, another leader in the protest, preferred to continue protesting peacefully. On September 25, 2003, Knafo left the encampment and returned home, only to discover she had been fired from her job. She later called the protest "a carnival that accomplished nothing. People need to take to the streets."

== After the protest ==
Knafo continues to appear in the media and at public events. She was part of the Israeli delegation to the launching ceremony of the Geneva Initiative in 2003.

When the single-mothers struggle faded from the public eye, 44 year old Knafo posed nude for a pornographic website. Later, she sued the site claiming she was never paid.

In September 2005, her oldest son committed suicide while under arrest for theft and battery against his girlfriend. He was 25, and Knafo stated that he suffered from mental problems.

In October 2006, Knafo joined Meretz, and indicated she might run in the party primaries.

In 2011 Knafo became spokesperson for the supermarket chain Mega Bull. This turned out to be a controversial move, and she was seen by some as selling out to the "tycoons".

In November 2016 Knafo set out on another march, this time to the residence of prime minister Binyamin Netanyahu, together with other social activists, under the slogan "two-year budget with social corrections".

In January 2019, Knafo joined the cast of the Israeli version of Celebrity Big Brother.

Knafo who is divorced and has three children, is a vegan. She works at a hotel in Mitzpe Ramon. Before that, she worked in housekeeping at a residential school, generally working two part-time jobs at a time. She spoke out about being an "outsourced" worker when the government was considering raising the minimum wage: "I don't have a pension, or benefits, and I can't even think about my old age. But if the minimum wage is raised, it will harm us, because employers will turn elsewhere. Anyway, I listen to the news and laugh. The minimum wage will never go up, it's bullshit."

== Additional reading ==
- Lavie, Smadar. "The Knafo Chronicles : Marching on Jerusalem With Israel's Silent Majority", Affilia: Journal of Women and Social Work. Vol. 27 (3): 300-315, 2012
- An Anatomy of Feminist Resistance: Rebel in the Wilderness, Henriette Dahan Kalev, Rowman & Littlefield, 2018
