= Esther Shkalim =

Israeli poet, Mizrahi feminist, cultural researcher (born 1954)

- אסתר שקלים
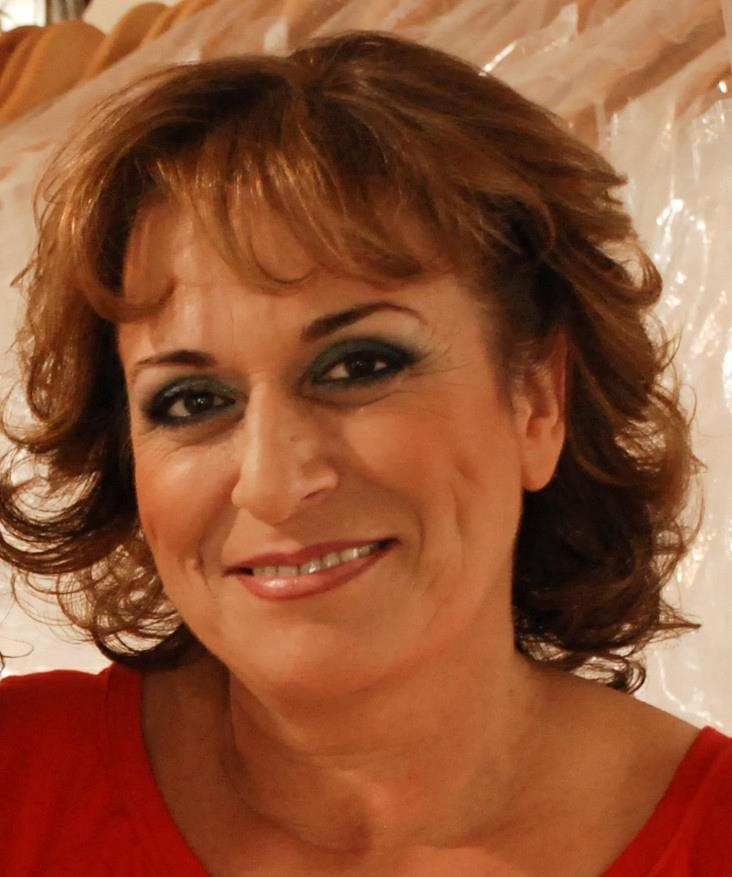
- Born: January 19, 1954 (age 72); Tehran, Iran
- Writing career
- Notable work: A Mosaic of Israel's Traditions
- Website: esthershkalim.co.il

Esther Shkalim (Hebrew: אסתר שקלים; born January 19, 1954) is an Israeli, Mizrahi feminist poet. Shkalim is a researcher of Jewish communities, and a curator of Jewish art. In her poetry Shekalim describes the experience of the female, Jewish and Mizrahi identities, in the family and public spheres.

== Biography ==
Shkalim was born in Tehran, the capital of Iran, to Nurit and Peretz Shkalim, the second of their five children. In 1958, when she was four, the family immigrated to Israel, where her father became a carpet dealer, and owner of a chain of stores.

After her national service she completed a BA in literature and history at Bar Ilan University. She then married and had three children. Later, she divorced. In the early 1990s, her husband was sent to the United States for four years for work, and that was when she started writing, as she was disconnected from home, friends, family and work. Shkalim says she is not influenced by other writers, and actually does not read poetry, because "when I read I don't write".

Shkalim completed her MA at Washington University in the United States, and then proceeded to study for her PhD at Tel Aviv University, in the department of Jewish history. Her area of research is the traditions of various Jewish communities, and of the Persian Jewish community in particular.

She was the founding manager of The Center for Jewish Heritage at the Eretz Israel Museum in Tel Aviv, and worked as a regional and national guide on Jewish art for the Israeli Ministry of Education, and also wrote and edited learning materials about holiday traditions of different communities in Israel. In her research, Shkalim traces not only the religious and cultural roots and expressions of Jewish traditions, but also how these traditions have been affected by the non-Jewish surroundings in which they were shaped.

== Poetry ==
Shkalim's poetry deals with the meeting point of East and West, and the status of women in the Persian and Mizrahi cultures, while reclaiming canonical texts to create ongoing dialogs with the Bible, Mishna, Talmud, Midrash and Aggadah, as well as piyyut, Jewish literature and more. Her work describes the Mizrahi woman's struggle for equality and self-realization, and the ambivalence experienced by a modern Israeli woman, who is feminist and religious, who grew up in the patriarchal-tribal Mizrahi culture.

Shkalim draws from her own experience, coming from a background she was taught to be ashamed of, her struggle with her own identity, and her emerging as a proud, assertive, Mizrahi feminist. Her book, Sharkia ("Fierce Eastern Wind") is largely autobiographical, and is included in the mandatory school literature curriculum in Israel.

== Works ==
- What a Woman Needs to Know מה צריכה אישה לדעת, ספר שירים הוצאת כנרת זמורה ביתן, 2017.
- Sharkia שרקיה ספר שירים הוצאת כנרת זמורה ביתן, 2006.
- A Mosaic of Israel's Traditions. Devora Publishing. Jerusalem/New York, 2006.
- Various anthologies, textbooks, journals, and literary reviews

== See also ==
- List of Iranian women writers and poets
