= Fogiel =

Fogiel is a surname. Notable people with the surname include:

- Aleksander Fogiel (1910–1996), Polish actor and director
- Marc-Olivier Fogiel (born 1969), French television and radio host
- Mieczysław Fogiel (1901–1990), Polish singer
- Radosław Fogiel (born 1982), Polish politician and sociologist
- Sylvie Fogiel Bijaoui (born 1951), French-Israeli sociologist
