= Amir Hetsroni =

Israeli professor (born 1968)

Amir Hetsroni Professor
- אמיר חצרוני
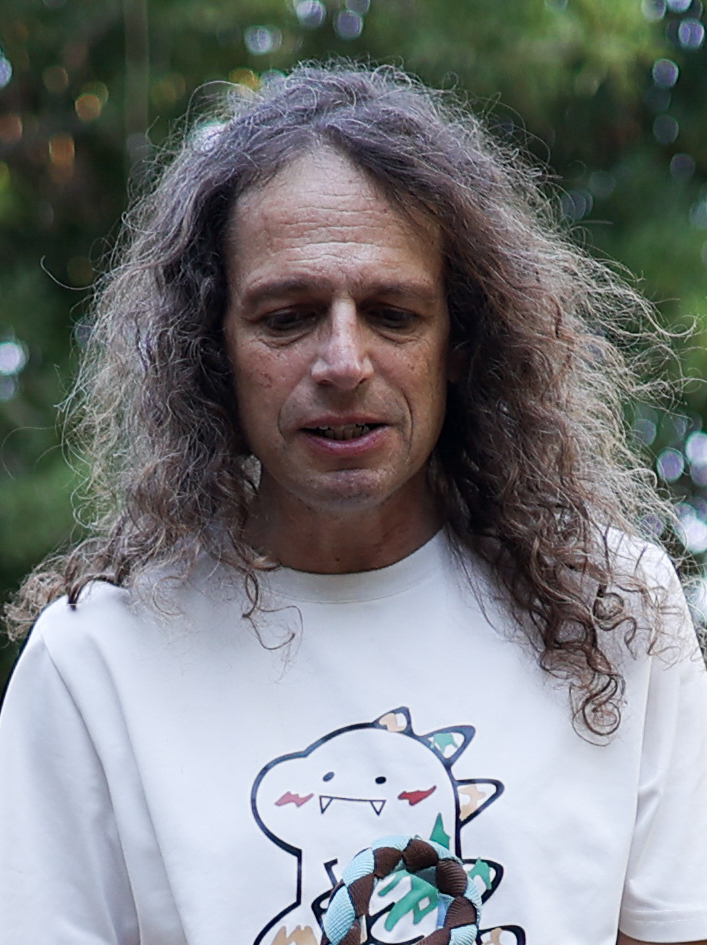
- Hetsroni in 2024
- Born: February 6, 1968 (age 58); Tel Aviv, Israel
- Citizenship: Poland, Romania, Israel
- Occupation: Associate professor at Koç University in Istanbul
- Parent(s): Sima Hetsroni (1932-2011), David Hetsroni (1931-2016)

Academic background
- Education: Hebrew University of Jerusalem
- Thesis: Public Perception of Nostalgia and Contents of Nostalgia in Advertising (1999)
- Academic advisors: Hanna Adoni, Jacob Shamir

Amir Hetsroni (Hebrew: אמיר חצרוני; born February 6, 1968) is an Israeli professor of communication science, novelist, comedian and social media personality. Commonly described as an internet troll, Hetsroni is known for his extremely divisive views and frequent employment of shock humor.

Hetsroni served in the Israel Defense Forces before earning a bachelor's degree in psychology and cinema, followed by a doctorate in communication science. He lectured at several universities and published numerous articles and books on media, advertising, and television. His academic work mainly revolves around the effects of television content on perceptions of daily life.

A prolific internet troll, Hetsroni is known for his highly sarcastic and offensive style of humor and expression and his divisive opinions, which have resulted in multiple controversies. His comments have been described as racist, sexist, misogynistic and xenophobic.

In 2020, a documentary about Hetsroni, Amir Hetsroni: Case Study, was screened and won awards at various international film festivals.

== Biography ==
Amir Hetsroni was born on February 6, 1968, in Tel Aviv, the only child of Sima Kolker (1932–2011) and David Hetsroni (formerly Shtagovsky; 1933-2016). Upon finishing high school studies he was conscripted into the Israel Defense Forces for three years. He was initially deployed in Nablus and as a security guard at a military base in Tel Aviv before serving as a military correspondent in Bamahane for two years. He graduated with BA in psychology and cinema and television from Tel Aviv University in 1993 and received an MA in 1996 and PhD in communication science from the Hebrew University of Jerusalem in 1999. He worked as a senior lecturer at Max Stern Yezreel Valley College from 2000 to 2009 and then became a professor at Ariel University which fired him in 2014. He was officially dismissed for insulting comments made against female victims of sexual assault. Hetsroni claimed that the university was retaliating against him due to an article he wrote supporting the BDS movement and objecting to the 2014 Gaza War.

In May 2015, he left Israel for Denmark. After living in Copenhagen for a while, he moved to China and taught at Xi'an Jiaotong–Liverpool University in Suzhou for a year, then moved to Turkey and became a full-time associate professor at Koç University in Istanbul. Hetsroni published hundreds of op-ed articles expressing anti-Zionist views, one novel, Pitzuhim, based on his memories growing up in the 1980s, and a webcomic, Lost in China, written in collaboration with Racheli Rottner and based on his turbulent open relationship with Shirin Noufi – an Arab-Israeli lawyer. Hetsroni is intentionally child free.

In May 2020, as part of Switzerland International Film Festival (SIFF) official competition, a feature-length documentary titled Amir Hetsroni: Case Study directed by the Swiss-Israeli psychologist and film director Giuseppe (Yossi) Strenger was screened. The film was shot in late 2016, on the month following David Hetsroni's – Amir's father – death, and unfolds Amir's mourning process and his relationship with Shirin Noufi, his partner at the time. The film won the first place in the festival's "Best Documentary" category. Later on that year, "Amir Hetsroni: Case Study" was also selected for the Out of The Can Film Festival in England, and for the Austria International Film Festival, where it has won an award for "Best Editing".

== Academic work ==
Hetsroni wrote and edited four books and nearly 100 journal articles and book chapters. His main areas of research are sex, violence, and other objectionable content on television programs and commercials and their effect on our perception of daily life. He argued that in contrast with common sense, inpatients in medical drama are more likely to die than in real hospitals and that religious viewers tend to be less afraid of crime and terror as they watch more television than are non-religious viewers. Hetsroni aligns with the cultivation school which suggests that routine viewing of television unconsciously influences the viewers to see the world through TV eyes, but he often adopts a more limited effect paradigm than the theory proponents George Gerbner and Larry Gross. Hetsroni's most original contribution to the scientific literature is the conception of pluralistic media ignorance according to which the more saturated the home screen is with objectionable content, the more likely viewers are to over-estimate the content's actual prevalence because of the difficulty in accurately quantifying it as it applies to reality. He was associate editor of Communication Research Reports and Corporate Communications and is listed among the 100 most prolific authors in advertising scholarship in a study published in 2008 in Journal of Advertising.

== Political opinions and controversies ==
Hetsroni has repeatedly stirred up controversy with comments about various sectors of society.

Hetsroni has made comments in favor of colonialism and against the absorption of refugees.

In 2011, Hetsroni published an op-ed in Haaretz arguing that although establishing a Jewish state after the Holocaust was justified, Israel was established in the wrong location, suggesting that it should have been established in Europe instead. He wrote that "after World War II, Germany was forced to surrender huge chunks of land to its neighbors and former victims: Poland received Silesia; Russia took Kaliningrad; the Czechs kicked the Germans out of the Sudetenland. We could have asked for a small territorial scrap as compensation for the genocide, but we didn’t. Instead, we asked for money; the Germans were, of course, thrilled to close the Holocaust bill with pocket gelt (the “shilumim”). We were dumb enough to take their offer and open a new account with the Palestinians that won’t be closed until the two nations part ways. It is unbelievable that we pushed ourselves willfully into a nonfunctional Israeli-Arab coexistence (and even invited the Arabs to take part in building the country!), when we could have made our home in peaceful Europe."

In 2012, when protestor Moshe Silman set himself on fire at a social justice demonstration, Hetsroni commented that this was "an inexpensive way to get rid of a parasite".

In 2013, he described feminist women marching in the SlutWalk as "too bulky to be looked at" and said that if he needed to choose between rescuing a feminist and rescuing a cat, he would rescue the cat as cats are more grateful than feminists are. He sued for slander a feminist activist who called him "misogynist consumer of prostitution" and won.

In 2014, he described the Gaza war as a massacre. In 2015, he stirred controversy during an appearance on a morning talk show when he blamed the Law of Return on the victory of the right wing in the legislative elections by enabling the immigration of Mizrahi Jews as well as Jews from the former Soviet Union, arguing that "if we didn’t open our legs without selection to all kinds of Jews, questionable Jews and half-Jews from third-rate countries, whose uniting characteristics are to kiss amulets, eat hummus, drink borscht, take government handouts and get an orgasm from arguing with the world, Boujie would have taken it in a cake walk." In an ensuing argument between Hetsroni and another guest speaker, Amira Buzaglo, who is of Moroccan Jewish descent, he told her that "nothing bad would have happened if your parents had stayed in Morocco and rotted there." Although he insisted that his remark did not make him a racist or fascist, co-host Yoav Limor expelled him from the studio. His remarks brought about a public outcry and demands for a police investigation against him for spreading racism and hate speech. In a subsequent media appearance, he said that he planned on leaving Israel within the year, stating "I’m leaving you with all this garbage and getting out of here. I’m too logical, too smart, and too successful for this country."

Further demands for a police investigation came in 2016, when Hetsroni desecrated the Israeli flag by posting a picture in which he uses the flag to mop the floor at his house and in 2017 when he posted a picture of himself smiling on the graves of soldiers saying that they were "idiots who did not know how to avoid the draft".

Israel's attorney general dismissed all the claims to put Hetsroni on trial, stipulating that his words fall within the perimeter of free speech. In 2018, Rabbi Meir Mazuz called Hetsroni an "incarnation of the devil". Hetsroni himself announced that he is "no longer Jewish".

In 2022, while Hetsroni was recording a live broadcast in Ashdod, a chair was thrown at him, striking him in the head, causing him to bleed and appear dizzy and disoriented. He received medical treatment and filed a police complaint over the incident. In subsequent remarks on Twitter, Hetsroni claimed "I was just attacked during filming in Ashdod by the second generation of cavemen that came without selection due to having a Jewish grandfather. Think about this next time you believe ‘selection’ is a bad word." He slammed Moroccan Jews in particular, blaming them for the assault, claiming "there is not only violence among Moroccans. Bedouins are likely more violent, and settlers don’t lack [violence] — but Moroccans are forgiven." He suggested that if a Bedouin or settler "had thrown a chair at me, they would already have been evicted from their tent or their outpost, but Moroccans are forgiven because we dared to take them out of their cave."

== Bibliography ==
- Ellis, L., Hershberger, S., Field, E., Wersinger, S., Pellis, S., Geary, D., Palmer, C. T., Hoyenga, K., Hetsroni, A., & Kazmer, K., & (2008). Sex differences: Summarizing more than a century of scientific research. London: Routledge.
- Hetsroni, A. (Ed.). (2010). Reality television: Merging the global and the local. Hauppauge, NY: Nova Science Publishers.
- Hetsroni, A.. (2012). Advertising and reality: A global study of representation and content. NY: Continuum.
- Hetsroni, A. (Ed.). (2016). Television and romance – Studies, observations and interpretations. Hauppauge, NY: Nova Science Publishers.
- חצרוני, א' (2013). פיצוחים . ת"א: ידיעות ספרים. (novel in Hebrew)
