= Shula Keshet =

Israeli Mizrahi feminist, social activist, and artist

Shula Keshet שולה קשת
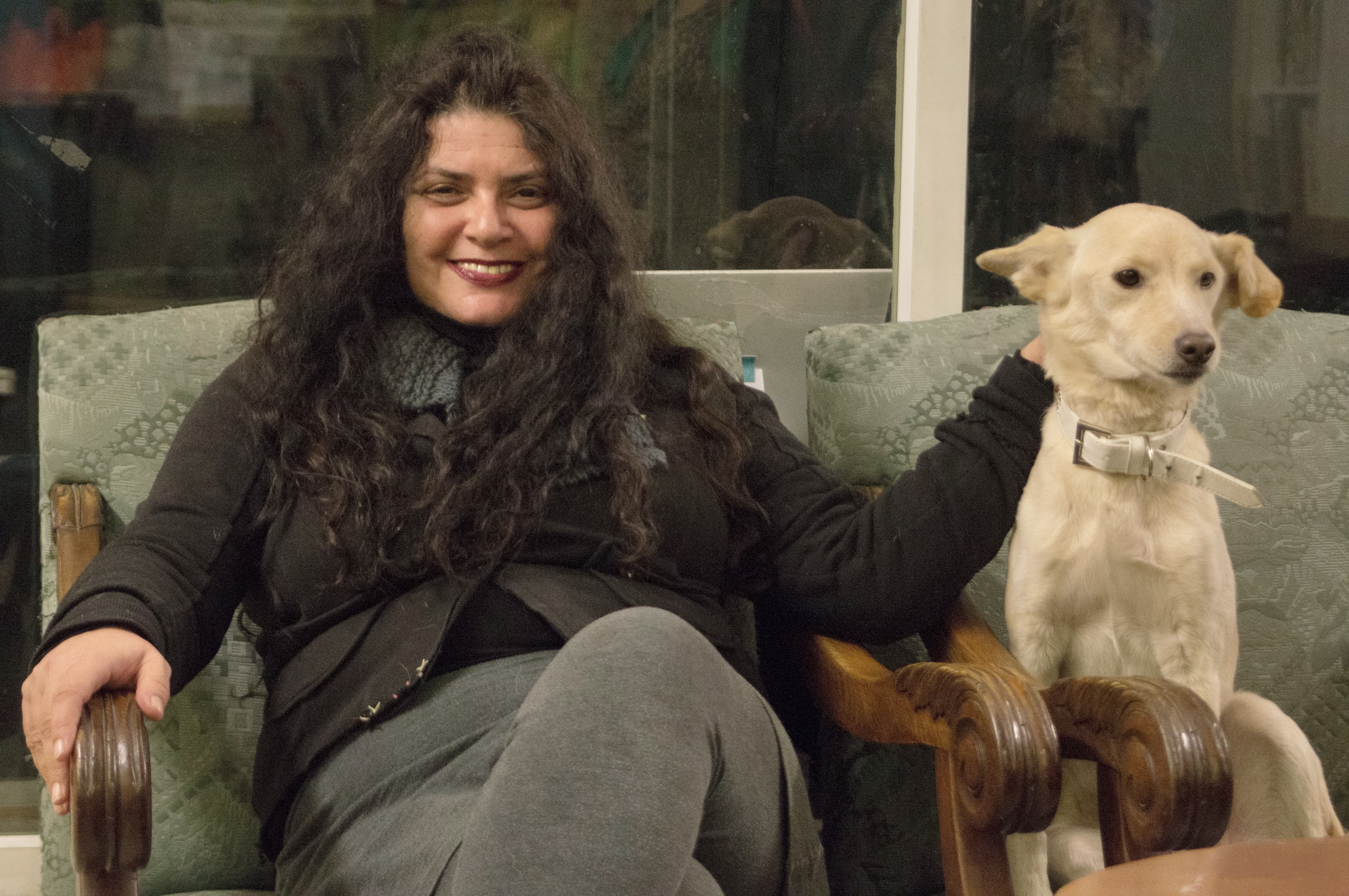
- Born: August 2, 1959 (age 66); Tel Aviv
- Citizenship: Israel
- Occupations: Social activist, artist, publisher, art curator
- Organization: Ahoti - for Women in Israel
- Movement: Mizrahi feminism

Shula Kehset (Hebrew: שולה קשת; born on August 2, 1959) is an Israeli social and political activist and entrepreneur, Mizrahi feminist, artist, curator, writer, educator, and publisher; one of the founders and the executive director of the Mizrahi feminism movement, "Ahoti – for Women in Israel".

Keshet is the leading figure in the struggle of the residents of South Tel Aviv against deportation of the African asylum seekers, and since the 1980s has been leading the protest movement against the Tel Aviv central bus station, which is located in the Neve Sha'anan neighborhood, contributing to crime, pollution, noise, overcrowding and drugs. She established Ahoti House, the headquarters of the Ahoti movement, which also serves as a community and culture center, information and educational center, art gallery, and more. She led the establishment of the Ahoti Fair trade store, which works to afford employment and income to women from marginalized communities. She founded the Libi BaMizrach (My Heart is in the East) festival of Mizrahi culture, and runs various other initiatives aimed at connecting between women from different oppressed communities, and providing them with the means for empowerment and relief – social, political, and legal.

Keshet's artwork centers upon her identity as a Mizrahi-feminist, and in her work as a curator and producer she brings together women of Arab ethnicity (whether Jewish, Muslim or Christian) and helps them tell their stories.

In May 2018, Keshet was elected the chair of the neighborhood committee of Neve Sha'anan, and in November 2018 she was elected to the Tel Aviv city council.

== Background ==
Keshet is the descendant of the Mashhadi Jews of Iran. She grew up, went to school and now works and lives in South Tel Aviv. Her grandmother, Hannah Kalati, was a community organizer, who established the "Mothers House" in South Tel Aviv, to provide elderly Mashadi women a safe space and social outlet. Her mother, Mazal Kashi, was a nurse, who worked for the welfare of neighborhood residents, making the rounds as a volunteer to provide everyone with free immunizations.

Keshet received her teaching certification, and then, in the early 1980s, taught art at the art college of Ramat HaSharon. After that, she taught at several Tel Aviv primary and middle schools, while also offering art courses and workshops at community centers.

In 1991, Keshet left teaching, and became the manager of the Milo Early Childhood Center in the Yad Eliyahu neighborhood of Tel Aviv. The center was created as a joint project by the municipality and the Ministry of Education. The center flourished, and she remained in this position for ten years. More than 1000 children from the distressed neighborhoods of South Tel Aviv visited the center every month, and were exposed to multi-disciplinary art and creativity.

Keshet's formal art education had the opposite of the desired effect, and almost made her give up on being an artist. She felt that the accepted artistic discourse had nothing to do with her, and nothing to do with the society she lived and acted within – but rather, reflected the hegemonic social discourse, highlighting European art and artists of European extraction, giving no space to Mizrahi, Arab, or other non-White art and artists.

However, teaching art sparked her creativity anew, and she began making art once more. This was especially true after Keshet met Tikva Levy, with whom she began collaborating. One major project was establishment of an Art & Cinema project in the Mizrahi school system Levy managed. Keshet's social and political consciousness grew and took shape in these years, and the workshops and courses included in the program dealt with issues of identity, history, community as a cultural asset, gender, and politics.

== Social and political activism ==
Keshet's life work to create social change spans over three decades, taking place at the social and cultural peripheries of Israel. She works at the points of intersection where women from different marginalized communities meet: Mizrahis, Palestinians, immigrants from the former Soviet Union, Ethiopians, asylum seekers, and work migrants. From this vantage point, Keshet is one of the leading influences on the growth of the feminist discourse that recognizes the effects of multiple oppressions, including those based on gender, ethnicity, culture, economic class, geographic location and access to resources; and also the introduction of this discourse into the hegemonic, White feminism.

Keshet's credo, upon which her activism is based, can be summarized as follows: "The situation of women of color in distressed areas will always be worse than that of both men and women from the hegemonic social group, and if we leave the struggle to the establishment or to hegemonic groups, we will continue to be viewed as a community in need of rehabilitation. The phenomenon of people coming from the outside to help poor and miserable people is how the hegemony preserves this social situation. The money that comes from the establishment or from philanthropic foundations of wealthy Ashkenazim will go to their representatives – again, those with external power – and they will decide where the money goes. They see us, the original inhabitants of the neighborhood, as incapable of managing this money and directing it to the real needs of the residents of the neighborhood."

=== Ahoti – for Women in Israel ===
In 2000, Keshet was one of the founders of the Ahoti – for Women in Israel movement (known as Ahoti ([my] sister)), and has headed it ever since. The movement is an aggregation of social justice initiatives of various types, all of which center on marginalized women. Projects led by Keshet include:

Ahoti House: Keshet is the conceiver and founder Ahoti House – a cultural and community center for the Ahoti movement and for residents of South Tel Aviv neighborhoods. The center was established in 2005, and provides a physical space for women of different backgrounds to engage in dialog, as a creative space and gallery, and as an educational space where lectures, workshops and courses related to Mizrahi feminism and women's issue are conducted.

Ahoti Fair Trade Shop: The store is the first and only one of its kind in the Middle East. It was established in 2009, and operates in collaboration with 16 social organizations throughout Israel. The store employs women in accordance with fair employment practices, and sells the handiwork of over 200 craftswomen from various cultural backgrounds, enabling them to cater to new markets, without the costs of advertising or middlemen.

Black Night events: The "Black Night of Culture" in an annual protest and celebration started in 2012. It is organized by Keshet in cooperation with other social activists as a counterpoint to the municipal "White Night" event. – created to celebrate the culture of the "White City" (as Tel Aviv is called, and designated by UNESCO) – which Mizrahi activists claim in ironically apt: The designated neighborhoods are in central and northern Tel Aviv (mostly Ashkenazi), while the southern neighborhoods (mostly Mizrahi or immigrant) are not represented, included and in fact, act, as the activists call it "as the garbage dump of the White City", to which the prostitution, drug trade, and bus pollution are directed.

Aheta Center: In 2006, Keshet and Lakia Yardeny founded the Aheta Center (Aheta is "sister" in Amharic), a cultural and occupational center for Ethiopian women in Kiryat Gat, with the goal of enabling economic empowerment for this marginalized group. The women create and sell traditional pottery, embroidery and weaving.

Women's National Network: Ongoing collaborations among women's groups representing marginalized communities, and between them and the business sector. In 2006, Keshet initiated the "Women Creating a Feminist Economy" project, fostering economic empowerment and entrepreneurship, based on mutual accountability.

=== South Tel Aviv activism ===
South Tel Aviv Against Expulsion: Keshet is the driving force behind this movement that objects to the plan by the Israeli government to deport African asylum seekers. According to Keshet, the government's policy is to incite conflict between different oppressed groups, in this case the veteran Mizrahi residents of South Tel Aviv and the African newcomers, thereby reducing the value of real estate in the neighborhood. Once one "problem" group is eliminated, the Mizrahi residents would be next – and the real estate would then be awarded to developers and tycoons for their own financial benefit, and that of their cronies in local government, but not to the residents. The neighborhood is already being gentrified at its margins, and according to Keshet, the future is not a mystery, but is already taking place.

The movement's struggle reached its peak at the start of 2018, when the government announced its deportation plan. Among the many activities that were sparked at this time, a rally was held in February, which drew over 20,000 participants.

The fight against the Tel Aviv central bus station: The central bus station in Tel Aviv is one of the most serious environmental and social hazards in the history of the State of Israel. At the end of the 1980s, Keshet established an action committee of Neve Sha'anan residents, who combated the placement of this health and life quality hazard in their neighborhood through the courts, lobbying the Knesset and the municipal authority, bringing the struggle to public awareness through demonstrations, protests and media activity. The struggle led to the compensation settlement for hundreds of residents. Keshet continues to lead new groups of residents in this effort.

Levinsky tent protest: During the 2011 Israeli social justice protests, Keshet began the "Roar of the South" protest, establishing a tent encampment in Levinsky Park in South Tel Aviv, mirroring the main tent city of Rothschild Boulevard. The purpose was to emphasize that the housing and cost of living protest in the north of the city did not represent the needs and narratives of the south side, and that the middle-class protest could not be considered a collective protest, as it was depicted, and that social justice cannot be achieved without accounting for those most in need. The site encompassed protest, community and culture, as events, music, discussion circles, parties and more took place around the clock. The police repeatedly dismantled the encampment, and each time, activists rebuilt it. The site quickly became a relief center for those in need – it welcomed the homeless of the area, Arab migrant workers needing a place to sleep, African asylum seekers seeking food and shelter, Filipino foreign workers, and more. The protest was based on non-violence, and both the residents and activists represented a wide swathe of Israel's social groups: Single mothers, transgender sex workers, Ethiopian Jews, children, the elderly, Mizrahi, Asian, European and so on. The encampment remained in place until October 3, 2011, when dozens of police and city inspectors arrived in force to dismantle it a final time.

Power to the Community: Following a wave of viol2011 Israeli social justice protestsence against African asylum seekers in South Tel Aviv, which also targeted Ethiopian citizens of Israel due to the color of their skin, in 2012 Keshet organized a series of public meetings that brought together veteran residents of Neve Sha'anan and newly arrived asylum seekers. The meetings let to the establishment of the organization "Koach LaKehila", or "Power to the Community", a multicultural and inclusive movement to stop the deterioration of the neighborhood and increase its safety. The group conducted safety patrols, engaged in dialog, offered relief services to individuals, and held community cultural and protest events.

=== Mizrahi cultural activism ===
My Heart Is in the East: Keshet founded the Libi BaMizrach (My Heart Is in the East) Coalition in 2009 together with several other Mizrahi activists, as an umbrella group with over 20 member organizations, as well as activists, academics, and artists from Israel and abroad, who have influence or are responsible for cultural, social or political agendas. The coalition is the first and only one of its kind in Israel, especially as relates to the Mizrahi struggle. Its goal is to be a driving force and effect change in the country, in particular through multicultural dialog, activities at the highest levels of the Ministry of Culture, releasing annual reports on resource distribution, and highlighting and celebrating Mizrahi culture.

=== Writing, documentation, and production ===
One of the central strategies for change promoted by Keshet is the distribution of knowledge that usually does not make its way into the canon of Israeli culture. Based on the belief that women's voices, and especially those from marginalized communities, are important to Israeli society, Keshet has built various systems to ensure that this knowledge is made widely available.

For example, the anthology To My Sister – Mizrahi Feminism in Israel (2007) combines poetry, essays, research, speeches and prose written by a wide variety of women from marginalized communities, academia, from distressed neighborhoods, from the geographic periphery, social activists, and more; The report "Racism and Sexism in the Media – The Test Case of the Elections for the 19th Knesset" (2013) documented racist and sexist coverage of the elections from a feminist perspective. The report was released in English, Hebrew and Arabic; In 2012, Ahoti published From A to Z: A Dictionary of Peace by Women in Israel, the culmination of a 3-year project by 60 Jewish Israeli and Arab women from South Tel Aviv, Rahat, Yehud and Kfar Kara, who each contributed her personal perspective on peace. The book, which includes both prose and poetry, was translated from Hebrew into Arabic and vice versa, as needed.

Keshet also publishes books and catalogs of her artistic work: The book and art exhibit "Women Creating Change" (Nashim Meshanot – 2009) documents the work of women from various feminist-activist settings; "Black Work" (Avoda Shchora – 2010) is a project and catalog of an exhibit first shown in the eSel Museum of Vienna, and the Barbour Gallery of Jerusalem. The exhibit curated works contrasting the world of labor with that of high art, together with the worlds of activism and corrective economy; Mizrahi and Palestinian Women in the Visual Arts deals with the interactions between Mizrahi and Palestinian culture in Israel through art and visual creation. The book displays the work of 34 artists working in various media, accompanied by essays by leading Mizrahi and Palestinian theorists.

== Art ==
Keshet is a Mizrahi feminist artist and art curator, envisioning and producing exhibits since the 1990s. She is the first curator in Israel to display, through art, the interconnection of identity and gender in the art of Mizrahi women, and to visually connect Mizrahi feminist activism and art.

One of Keshet's primary goals as a curator and producer is to create spaces in which to show Mizrahi art, as well as art from other groups – such as Palestinian and Ethiopian women – which has been long absent from the mainstream of Israeli art, and to make the art accessible to various communities, including in the geographic peripheries, as opposed to the mainstream that exists in the affluent, largely-Ashkenazi center of the country. She also publishes books and catalogs of the exhibitions so that they will be documented and accessible in the long term.

Keshet's own art reflects these same ideas, and seeks to spark new discourses about Israeli society. She works in multiple media, and is particularly known for her micrography, and has exhibited in solo and group exhibitions.

=== Solo exhibitions ===
- "Mother's House" (Beit Em), Jerusalem Artists House, March 2004 A collection of portraits of women from Keshet's family, side by side with illustrations of fictional women. This exhibit depicted an imagined matrilineal family tree, as a commentary on the place and importance of women in the family/social order.
- "Women's Tractate A" (Masechet Nashim A), Ahoti House Gallery, December 2010; Based on a series of meetings in which women provided feminist analysis of Jewish texts.
- "For the Glory of the State of Israel" (LeTiferet Medinat Yisrael), Ahoti House Gallery, May 2014 A series of portraits of well-known personae from the history and culture of Israel, created with micrography – an ancient Jewish art form of creating pictures out of finely calligraphied words. The words were racist quotes against Mizrahim by the figures in the pictures, which included founding Prime Minister of Israel David Ben Gurion, Jewish activist Arthur Rupin, renowned poet Nathan Zach, and famous Israeli singer Matti Caspi.

=== Group exhibitions ===
- "Ahoti: Mizrahi Women Artists in Israel". Curators: Shula Keshet, Rita Mendes-Fleur. Jerusalem Artists House, February 2000
- "Kria Mizrahit". Curator: Shula Keshet. Ministry of Education, Tel Aviv, March 2002
- "Lights and Shadows: The Story of Iran and the Jews". The Diaspora Museum, Tel Aviv. January – August 2011

=== Curation ===
- "Mizrahiot" (Mizrahi women), Ami Steinitz Gallery of Contemporary Art, 2000
- "13 Live Bullets", art gallery of Oranim College, Tivon; Heinrich Boll Gallery, Tel Aviv Memorial project for 13 Palestinian citizens of Israel who were shot to death in October 2000 during conflicts with armed police. The display included childhood pictures of the fallen, video witness statements by their families, press clippings, personal items, and minutes from the official investigation and reports issued by the Adalah legal justice organization.
- "Mizrahi and Arab Women in the Visual Arts in Israel". Curators: Shula Keshet, Zahd Harash/ 2004, 2005
- "Women Creating Change", Ministry of Education, 2002, 2009
- "תהו ובהו וחושך על פני תהום", (without form, and void; and darkness was upon the face of the deep – from Genesis 1:2 ) Yad L'Banim, 2006
- "Black Work" (Avoda Shchora); Curators: Shula Keshet and Ketzia Alon. First shown in eSel, Vienna, and in Barbour Gallery, Jerusalem
- "Stains and Signatures" (Ktamim VeHakhtamot) – Mizrahi and Palestinian Women in the Visual Arts. Curators: Shula Keshet, Farid Abu-Shakra. Ahoti House Gallery, The Nazareth Art Gallery, November 2015
- "Breaking Walls – Contemporary Mizrahi Women Artists in Israel", Redline Gellery, Beer Sheva, 2016

== Awards and recognition ==
- 2011 – Jewel Bellush Israeli Feminist Award from the National Council of Jewish Women
- 2013 – Shortlisted for the Rappaport Award, as a creator of change in Israeli society
- 2014 – Award from the Libe BaMizrach Coalition
- 2014 – The Yeshayahu Leibowitz Award for significant public works, as General Director of Ahoti House
- 2016 – Recognition award from the Knesset's Committee on the Status of Women and Gender Equality, headed by Aida Touma-Suleiman
- 2019 – Association for Civil Rights in Israel Emil Greenzweig Human Rights award

=== Media lists ===
- 2007 – Chosen by The Marker magazine as one of the top 40 women creating change in society
- 2018 – Chosen by The Marker magazine as one of the 100 most influential people in Israel

== Books ==
- לאחותי, פוליטיקה פמיניסטית מזרחית, הוצאת בבל ומשכל, 2007; מערכת, פתח דבר
- שוברות קירות: אמניות מזרחיות עכשוויות בישראל, קציעה עלון ושולה קשת, אוצרות ועורכות; תל אביב: הוצאת "אחותי" תשע"ד
- כתמים והחתמות: מזרחיות ופלסטיניות באמנות החזותית בישראל, פריד אבו שקרה, שולה קשת; הוצאת "אחותי" 2015
- נשים משנות, שלומית אהרוני ליר ושולה קשת (עורכות), הוצאת "אחותי" 2009
- קשת של דעות: סדר יום מזרחי לחברה בישראל; עורכים: יוסי יונה, יונית נעמן, דוד מחלב; "ספרי נובמבר" 2007
- מא' עד ת' – מילון שלום של נשים בישראל, עורכות: בת שחר גורמזאנו גורפינקל ושולה קשת; הוצאת "אחותי" 2012
- עבודה שחורה, עורכות: שולה קשת, קציעה עלון ושלומית לולה נחמה, הוצאת "אחותי" 2010.
