= Henriette Dahan Kalev =

Israeli academic and Mizrahi feminist (born 1947)

Henriette Dahan Kalev הנרייט דהאן כלב
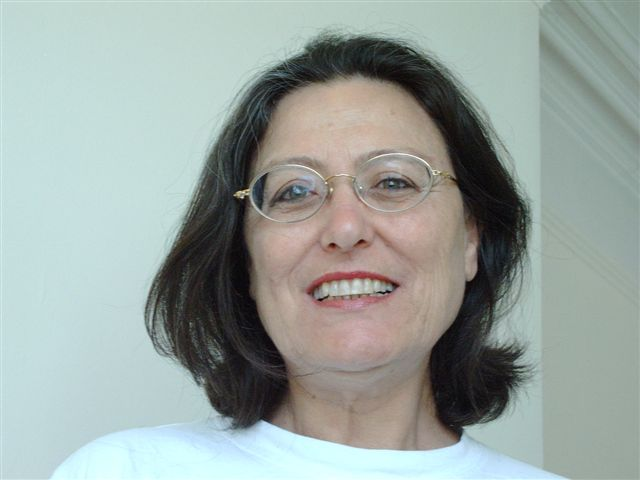
- Kalev in 2004
- Born: April 27, 1947 (age 79); Morocco
- Citizenship: Israel
- Occupations: Feminist theorist Political scientist
- Organization(s): Ahoti; Mizrahi Democratic Rainbow Coalition; B'Tselem

Henriette Dahan Kalev (Hebrew: הנרייט דהאן כלב; born on April 27, 1947) is an Israeli Senior Lecturer of political science and the founder of the Gender Studies Program at Ben Gurion University. She is one of the founders of the Mizrahi feminist movement, and one of the leading theorists of Mizrahi feminism.

== Biography ==
Dahan Kalev was born in Morocco and immigrated to Israel with her parents when she was a toddler in 1949. After their immigration, they were housed in the "Sha'ar Aliyah" immigrant camp. From there they moved to Pardes Hanna, Tiberias and Holon, and when she was ten they moved to Jerusalem.

She completed her bachelor's, master's and doctoral degrees at the Hebrew University in the Department of Political Science. Her master's thesis was on the subject of "Intellectuals in Politics". She received her PhD in 1992. Her dissertation title was "Self-Organizing System: Wadi Salib and the Black Panthers - Implications for Israeli Society." This was the first study to be conducted on the events of Wadi Salib and the connection between Wadi Salib and the Black Panthers protests. The study dealt with the mechanisms of discrimination by state institutions toward Mizrahim. Its major conclusions included the great missed opportunity of the State of Israel to accommodate protest as a democratic act. Parts of the research were published as articles by the Israel Democracy Institute, the Yad Ben Zvi Institute and in the Van Leer Institute publications. Her article "Mizrahi Feminism - Between East and West" deals with the growth of the Mizrahi feminist in Israel. Another article written by Dahan Kalev is "You're so pretty, you do not look Moroccan", which was translated into several languages, and is taught in postcolonial programs in Israel and abroad.

Dahan Kalev is a researcher of political thought, feminist theory, the interplay between gender and politics, globalization and postcolonialism. She was a research fellow at the Institute for the Study of Ideology of the Department of Political Science and International Relations at Oxford University and was a visiting professor at Somerville College. She founded and served as the head of the Gender Studies Program at Ben Gurion University and lectures at the Social and Economics College. She is a member of the National Press Council, the Public Committee for Education in Israel, served as an adviser to the IDF and the Municipality of Be'er Sheva on women's issues.

She is a member of the board of directors of the human rights organization B'Tselem, and on the steering committee of the Yitzhak Rabin Center for Israel Studies. She is a founder and executive committee member of the Alternative Information Center and a member of the board of the Mizrahi Democratic Rainbow Coalition.

Dahan Kalev is a recipient of the Women Creating Change award (2000), and was on the nominations committee of the Nobel Prize in 2004.

In 1994, Dahan Kalev was one of the Mizrahi feminists who disrupted the 10th Feminist Conference in Givat Haviva, in protest of the exclusion of Mizrahi women from the centers of power in the feminist movement by Ashkenazi women, and the refusal to include their issues in the movement. This event is considered the birth of the Mizrahi feminist movement, and Dahan Kalev became one of the founders of the Mizrahi feminist organization Ahoti - for Women in Israel, and a leading theorist, introducing Mizrahi feminism into academic frameworks.

== Select works ==
=== Books ===
- מין, מגדר, פוליטיקה בעריכת דפנה יזרעאלי, חנה הרצוג, חנה נווה, אריאלה פרידמן, סלביה פוגל-ביזאוי, הנרייט דהאן כלב, מנר חסן. תל אביב, עם עובד, 1999.
  Sex, Gender, Politics. Ed. Dafna Yizraeli, Hanna Herzog, Hanna Naveh, Ariella Friedman, Sylvie Fogiel-Bijouawi, Henriette Dahan Kalev, Manar Hasan. Tel Aviv, Am Oved, 1999 (Hebrew).
- נשים בדרום: מרחב, פריפריה, מיגדר בעריכת הנרייט דהאן-כלב, ניצה ינאי וניצה ברקוביץ. קריית שדה בוקר: מכון בן-גוריון לחקר ישראל, אוניברסיטת בן-גוריון בנגב, תשס"ו, 2005.
  Women in the South: Space, Periphery, Gender. Ed. Henriette Dahan Kalev, Niza Yanay & Niza Berkowitz. Ben Gurion University, 2005.
- הנרייט דהאן כלב, נשים בישימון: מרי וסירוב בשולי החברה, הוצאת רסלינג, 2018.
  Women in the Wilderness: Revolt and Refusal on the Margins of Society. Henriette Dahan Kalev, Riesling 2018
- בסוד ברכה - יצרתה של ברכה סרי, הנרייט דהאן כלב. כרמל, 2013
  Secret Blessing (Bracha) - The works of Bracha Seri, Henriette Dahan Kalev, Carmel 2013

"Mizrachim In Israel." Who's Left in Israel. Ed. Dan Leon. Brighton: Sussex Academic Press, 2004. 161–168.

=== Articles ===
- "Constituting the Moral Subject: The Self and the Other in Gender Theories of Justice". Double Dialogues: Journal Special Issue on Otherness, eds. Maeve Tynan and Rebecca Parbo
- “Breaking Their Silence: Mizrahi Women and the Israeli Feminist Movement.” Studies in Contemporary Jewry: Sephardic Jewry and Mizrahi Jews XXII (2007): 193–209
- "Officers as Educators: The Ex-Military in the Israeli School System.” Israel Affairs 12.2 (2006): 268–283.
- “Female Genital Mutilation and Human Rights.” Sex Roles 51 (2004): 339–348.
- "Fear of Arabness." Fear Horror and Terror Oxford Press, Inter-Disciplinary Press, ‘At the Interface/Probing the Boundaries' Series, Rodopi Press
- “You Are So Pretty, You Don’t Look Moroccan.” Israeli Studies 6 (2001): 1–14.
- “Bargaining with Spiritual Patriarchy: The Women in the Shas Movement in Israel.” New Topics in Feminist Philosophy of Religion: Contesting Concepts, Practice and Transcendence. Ed. Pamela Sue Anderson. London: Springer Kluwer Press,
- “Tensions in Israeli Feminism: The Mizrahi Ashkenazi Rift.” Women's Studies International Forum 24 (2001): 1–16.
- Palestinian Activism in Israel: A Bedouin Woman Leader in a Changing Middle East. Henriette Dahan-Kalev, Emilie Le Febvre, Amal El' Sana-Alh'jooj. Palgrave Macmillan, 2012
- Kalev, H. D. (2018). Colorism in Israel: The Construct of a Paradox. American Behavioral Scientist, 62(14), 2101–2116. https://doi.org/10.1177/0002764218810749
