= Communication Research Reports =

- Discipline: Communication studies
- Language: English
- Edited by: Dave Keating

Publication details
- History: 1984-present
- Publisher: Routledge
- Frequency: Quarterly
- Open access: Hybrid
- Impact factor: 1.3 (2022)

Standard abbreviations
- ISO 4: Commun. Res. Rep.

Indexing
- ISSN: 0882-4096 (print); 1746-4099 (web)
- LCCN: sn85001024
- OCLC no.: 321019859

Links
- Journal homepage; Online access; Online archive

Communication Research Reports is a quarterly peer-reviewed academic journal covering communication studies. It was established in 1984 and is published by Routledge.

The journal specializes in the publication of reports-style manuscripts using social scientific methods (such as quantitative data analysis). The most common type of manuscripts published are research reports, which often feature "scales, causal models, novel correlations, and immediate observations — constitute the 'nuts and bolts' of human communication..."

In 2016, the journal was rated as the third-most central to the field of human communication.

Since April 2019, the journal supports several of the open science initiatives sponsored by the Center for Open Science, including the use of badges on certain articles that allow readers unfettered access to research materials, sharing copies of study materials (questionnaires or stimulus materials used in experiments), as well as sharing data analysis files.

== Abstracting and indexing ==
The journal is abstracted and indexed in EBSCO databases, PsycINFO, and Scopus.

== Editors-in-chief ==
The founding editor-in-chief of the journal was James C. McCroskey (Pennsylvania State University). Dave Keating (University of New Mexico) is currently serving as the editor of vols. 40–42.

== Past editors ==
Years	Editor	Institution (at time of Editorship)
1984-1988	James C. McCroskey	West Virginia University
1988-1992	Michael J. Beatty	Cleveland State University
1995	James C. McCroskey	West Virginia University
1996-1998	Jerry L. Allen	University of New Haven
1999-2001	Andrew S. Rancer	University of Akron
2002-2004	John C. Sherblom	University of Maine
2005-2007	Lisa Sparks	George Mason University
2008-2010	Wendy Samter	Bryant University
2011-2013	Theodore Avtgis	West Virginia University/Ashland University
2014-2016	Don Stacks	University of Miami
2017-2019	Nicholas David Bowman	West Virginia University (until August 2019)/Texas Tech University (as of September 2019)
2020-2022	Keith Weber	Chapman University
