= Vicki Shiran =

Israeli Jewish activist (1947 - 2004)

Vicki Shiran (Hebrew: ויקי שירן; February 28, 1947 − March 15, 2004) was an Israeli criminologist, sociologist, poet, film director, media personality and activist. She was a leader of a movement promoting Mizrahi Jewish consciousness in Israel. She was an advocate of equal rights and played a key role in the fight for the advancement of Mizrahim (Jews who originate from Arab or Muslim countries). She was among the founders of The Mizrahi Democratic Coalition and the Feminist group Achoti, and is considered one of the founding mothers of the Mizrahi feminist movement.

== Early life ==
Victorine "Vicki" Ben Natan was born in Cairo, to parents Salvo and Fortuna Ben Natan. Salvo, originally from Alexandria, had an accounting degree, but worked as a laborer in a textile factory. The family, including her sisters Odette (b. 1944) and Verjane (b. 1950), immigrated to Israel in 1951, when she was 4. Her brother Uzi was born there, in 1956. She spent her childhood in the Hatikva (hope in Hebrew) slum of Tel Aviv. In 1960, her father lost his job in the recession, and she was forced to leave school at the age of 13, and go to work to help support her family. She completed her matriculation exams at 17, by going to night school.

In 1974, she married Haim Shiran (Shakiran), a filmmaker originally from Meknes, Morocco. They had two daughters.

== Education and academic career ==
Shiran received her BA in literature, history and criminology, and her MA in criminology from Tel Aviv University.

In 1991, she completed another master's degree and a PhD at the John Jay College of Criminal Justice at New York University. Her doctoral dissertation was titled "Political Corruption – The Power of the Game: The Case of Israel". The work was based on archival, legal and media research, dealing with corruption in Israeli politics and discrimination against Mizrahi politicians. Shiran analyzed prominent cases of political corruption and white-collar crime in Israel between 1948 and 1988. According to Shiran's analysis, the political and legal systems tend to severely punish Mizrahi and Arab politicians belonging to small parties, while on the other hand showing restraint towards, or even ignoring the actions of politicians who are closer to the ruling hegemony.

In the 1990s, she taught criminology and gender at Beit Berl Academic College, and taught at the Hebrew University of Jerusalem's Department of Law and Criminology. In 2003, she founded the Women's and Gender Studies Program at Beit Berl and was appointed as its first chairwoman.

== Mizrahi activism ==
Shiran was a prominent activist against all forms of oppression of human rights in Israel. She made her mark in particular in three main areas: The struggle for Israeli-Palestinian peace, feminism, and the rights of the Mizrahim.

She often expressed herself in ways that were considered by some to be provocative. For example, she said, "For anyone living in a distressed neighborhood, it means that the state fucked them. As simple as that... In Israeli society there is inequality. The inequality is not only according to class, it also has color."

Shiran identified with leftist organizations in Israel and often protested the occupation of the Palestinian territories and expressed support for the establishment of a Palestinian state. She became active in Mizrahi-identified organizations and struggles against the occupation starting in 1970, including the Mizrahi Democratic Rainbow and the East to Peace. She participated in numerous peace conferences and demonstrations in Israel and Europe.

As a feminist, Shiran was one of the founders of the Mizrahi Women's Group, which was created to awaken the public feminist discourse in Israel, in light of what she saw as the failure of the second wave of feminism: "It is possible that because Israeli feminism remained insular from, and even disregarded social issues, it has remained as a wallflower in the public discourse." In 1999, this group became the Mizrahi feminist movement Ahoti – for Women in Israel, which promotes economic, social and cultural justice, and solidarity with women of low socio-economic status in Israeli.

Shiran began her Mizrahi activism in her youth in the Hatikva neighborhood: First, as a leading figure in the Mizrahi youth social protest movements, and then throughout the 1970s and 1980s in the Black Panthers, Citizens for Neighborhoods, the Eastern Front, and more. From 1969 to 1975 she directed the community theater in Jaffa. In 1981 she initiated The "Israel-That's Me!" conference, discussing the rifts between the Ashkenazi establishment and Mizrahi and Palestinian-Israeli citizens of Israel in the open for the first time. This led her to establish the New Direction Stage at the HaTikva slum, where she and her activist friends invited Ashkenazi politicians and public figures so that they hear their criticism about the overlap between Israel's ethnic and class divides.

In the early 1980s, she headed the "Tsalash" movement (Zionism for Equality), whose members included Daniel Ben Simon and sociologist Sammy Smooha. In 1981 the movement petitioned the High Court of Justice against the Israel Broadcasting Authority. The suit claimed that the historical series "Pillar of Fire" ignores the existence of the Mizrahim and denies their role in building the nation. Shiran demanded that the series be banned until this bias is corrected. Shiran's claim was rejected by the High Court of Justice, but the verdict, known as "the Shiran Appeal", became a milestone in the Mizrahi struggle against discrimination in Israel.

In 1981, she joined Tami (Traditional Movement of Israel), a political party that appealed to the traditional Mizrahi religious community, and was headed by Aharon Abuhatzeira. Shiran became the party spokesperson. In 1996 she was one of the founders of the Mizrahi Democratic Rainbow Coalition, a movement that fought for social, economic and cultural justice. In 2003, together with other activists from the Mizrahi Democratic Rainbow, Shiran won a High Court of Justice's claim against the Israel Lands Administration regarding fair housing and just land distribution.

In 1983, she ran for mayor of Tel Aviv-Yafo as part of the Tami list, but received only 1.6 percent of the vote, while the list itself won 1.9 percent of the votes and did not enter the city council.

== Mizrahi feminism ==
Shiran is considered one of the "founding mothers" of Mizrahi feminism, and the movement's first public persona.

The birthplace of Mizrahi feminism – the feminist movement that deals with the particular intersection of oppressions of Mizrahi women – is considered to be the 10th Feminist Conference that took place at Givat Haviva in 1994. At the time, Mizrahi women in the feminist movement had been fighting for recognition of their issues and their inclusion on the feminist agenda, as well as for representation in the key decision-making organizations and centers of power in the movement. Israeli feminism had been mostly imported from the United States in the 1970s and 1980s, and adopted mostly by the hegemonic group of white Ashkenazi Jewish women in Israel. There was a great deal of resistance to the idea that the issues facing women are not universal, and the Mizrahi women felt unheard and marginalized within the feminist movement that claimed to represent them.

At the conference, when it became clear that the agenda and topics would not be adjusted to their needs, several Mizrahi women, including Shiran, Ella Shohat, Tikva Levy, Mira Eliezer, Henriette Dahan-Kalev, Neta Amar, and others, initiated an action to "take the mic" at the conference. This time, they consciously chose a plan of action that would ensure they could not be ignored or their issues tabled, even at the cost of open confrontation with the Ashkenazi feminists. The Mizrahi feminists engaged in angry protest at the event, and stormed the stage during the ideological debate, accusing Ashkenazi feminists of racism, oppression and exclusion, and began narrating and describing their experiences as Mizrahi in Israel. Among their stories, the women recounted how their names were taken from them and changed to Israeli names upon their arrival in Israel, the degrading treatment and racism that was and continues to be endemic to Israeli society and institutions, attitudes that pressured or forced them to deny and abandon their Arab culture and their languages of origin in order to integrate into Israeli society.

The original discussion planned for the evening was wholly disrupted, displaced by an open battle between the participants, who were divided according to their positions on the Mizrahi issue. The Ashkenazi women vehemently rejected the claims that they were partners in the oppression of Mizrahi feminists and claimed that the ethnic issue was irrelevant to feminism and that it was obsolete. The Mizrahi women, on the other hand, accused the Ashkenazi women of silencing them, and of blindness to the intersections of gender, ethnic and class identity of Mizrahi women and demanding Ashkenazi recognition that the Mizrahi and ethnic struggles also affect women's lives and should be integrated immediately into the Israeli feminist struggle.

After the conference, and the refusal of Ashkenazi feminists to recognize the demands of Mizrahi feminists, some Mizrahi women felt that they had no choice but to separate themselves from the feminist movement and to act independently. They organized the first Mizrahi feminist conference in 1996, which dealt with the history of Mizrahi oppression in Israel. Shiran became one of the primary formulators of Mizrahi feminist theory and was a leader in the cohesion of the group into a solidly independent movement, but also participated in grassroots feminist activities. She was one of the founders of Ahoti (my sister), For Women in Israel, a Mizrahi feminist movement founded in 1999. The movement began promoting the labor rights of women from oppressed classes in Israel, and then expanded to various other areas, such as highlighting women's creations and publishing, fair trade, establishment of the Ahoti House, which serves as a community center, gallery and activism headquarters, and more. She was also one of the prominent leaders of the campaign against pornography in the media, and her last achievement as an activist before her death was he successful legislation drive and lost Supreme Court suit against the broadcast of pornography on public TV.

Shiran was the formulator of the "quarters" principle of representation, according to which resources should always be equally divided between Israeli-Palestinian, Mizrahi, Ashkenazi and lesbian women. The principle is also applied to institutional representation, such as the makeup of committees, conferences and panels.

== Media activity ==
Shiran was on the board of directors of the Israel Broadcasting Authority (2000–2004), a member of the Second Authority for Television and Radio and a director of the Channel 2 News Company (2000–2004) and a member of the board of directors of Am Oved Publishers (2001–2004).

Shiran became a well-known media figure, appearing extensively on television, radio and in the news, promoting the social issues she worked on. She published hundreds of articles in Yedioth Ahronoth and other newspapers. In her interviews, she insisted on the principle of equal representation of women and other marginalized groups in the media. Her last campaign was with the "Coalition of Women Against Pornography", which fought against pornographic broadcasts on Israeli television channels.

"She was a legend. Everyone knew her politics, but her politics were only relevant within the human context," said Zamira Ron of Achoti. "She always wanted us to go into the distressed neighborhoods, to seek out women and men in their forties, who had never had the opportunity to go to school, and convince them to go back and get a higher education. She spoke to them like a friend, one by one, simply and at eye level."

Shiran was the scriptwriter for The Salt Statue (1981), produced by Israel Educational Television, which won the International UNESCO Award and the prestigious Israeli David's Harp Prize.

== Death ==
In 1997, Vicky Shiran was diagnosed with breast cancer. Despite her illness, she continued to invest all her talents and resources in promoting cultural and public welfare.

At the beginning of 2004, her health deteriorated. She died on March 15, 2004, and was buried in the civilian cemetery at Kibbutz Einat.

In 2005, about a year after her death, a book of her poetry, Breaking the Wall published by Am Oved.

The book To My Sister, Mizrahi Feminist Politics, was published in 2007 and is dedicated to her memory.

The Vicki Shiran Prize was awarded annually for the best documentary film at the International Women’s Film Festival in Rehovot, until the festival’s closure in 2014.

In 2013, Itzhak Halutzi directed the film Breaking the Wall, about Shiran's life story.
