= Ahoti – for Women in Israel =

Israeli feminist social movement

Ahoti - for Women in Israel אחותי - למען נשים בישראל
- Formation: 2000
- Founder: Vicki Shiran, Shula Keshet, Henriette Dahan Kalev, Neta Amar, et al
- Founded at: Tel Aviv
- Type: Mizrahi feminist & social justice
- Executive Director: Shula Keshet

Ahoti – for Women in Israel (in Hebrew: אחותי – למען נשים בישראל, known as "Ahoti") is a feminist social movement, founded upon the principles of Mizrahi feminism. The movement works to promote issues of economic, social and cultural justice, and to empower and create solidarity among women of the lower socio-economic classes in Israel.

== History ==
The Ahoti movement was officially founded in 2000 by a group of Mizrahi feminist activists, including Henriette Dahan Kalev, Vicki Shiran, Neta Amar, and Shula Keshet, who is the executive director of the organization. The movement was founded upon the principles of Mizrahi feminism, and was born of the perspective that the feminist organizations in Israel were created and run by Ashkenazi women, mostly middle- and upper-class, and academics, from the center of the country, who worked to promote issues of interest and relevance to them. The Ahoti movement does not dismiss these issues, but contends that they are neither singular nor universal, and that they marginalize from the public consciousness the existence of large communities of women who are struggling for their everyday existence, and not for equal pay at executive levels or representation at senior levels of government.

In 2007, Ahoti published the anthology To My Sister, Mizrahi Feminist Politics, which is a collection of articles, essays, speeches, personal stories, prose and poetry dealing with Mizrahi feminism. Included are issues such as class, identity, memory and alternatives. In 2012, Ahoti published From A to Z: A Dictionary of Peace by Women in Israel, the culmination of a 3-year project by 60 Jewish Israeli and Arab women from South Tel Aviv, Rahat, Yehud and Kfar Kera, who each contributed her personal perspective on peace. The book, which includes both prose and poetry, was translated into both Hebrew and Arabic, as needed.

In 2003, Ahoti was a partner in the struggle of Vicki Knafo and the single mothers against cutbacks in child stipends. In 2008, Ahoti took part in the struggle against ethnically segregated schools in Immanuel. Together with the Tmura center, Ahoti sued on behalf of some of the parents in the settlement for violation of the law prohibiting equal use of public facilities. Concurrently, an appeal was made to the High Court of Justice, and protests were held in front of the Ministry of Education. In 2014, Ahoti founded the "Mizrahi Feminist Madrasa", an educational program offering courses and workshops.

The Ahoti movement is a member of the Shutfut (partnership) Coalition, a coalition of women's organizations working together to promote equality and justice for women, with an emphasis on lobbying and advocacy. Other organizations in the coalition include Itach-Maaki Women Lawyers for Social Justice, Adva Center, Ruach Nashit (women's spirit), Kol Ha Isha (women's voice), and more.

In 2009, Ahoti opened the Ahoti Fair Trade shop, the first and only of its kind in the Middle East. The store is operated in cooperation with 16 social organizations from around the country, and employs women on fair wage terms and sells handicrafts from more than 200 manufacturers from a variety of cultural groups, including cooperatives such as Ahta in Kiryat Gat, and Women Brewing a Business from Jerusalem. All the products are made by women who need economic empowerment, and through the store women can find new markets for their products, without the costs of middlemen or advertising.

== Ahoti House ==
The movement's headquarters was established in the south Tel Aviv neighborhood of Neve Sha'anan, and serves as cultural and community center for Mizrahi feminism. It houses an information center, multi-disciplinary counseling, art shows, lectures, workshops, courses, and other events geared to residents of the neighborhood and the public at large.

Ahoti house hosts the annual "Black Night" festival, which is held in protest of the Tel Aviv municipal "White Night" festival. Ahoti, together with other representatives of south Tel Aviv neighborhoods (which are largely Mizrahi, and more recently also Black) claim that "The White City", as Tel Aviv is known, is also the "White" city – that the municipality serves the Ashkenazi neighborhoods, and elevates Ashkenazi culture, at the literal expense of South Tel Aviv residents, whose neighborhoods have become slums, rife with drugs and prostitution, as well as pollution; and who in addition pay the cultural and social prices of this discrimination. "Black Night" events have become a target for police action, particularly in 2013, when the festival began.

== Staff ==
Actor and director Ronit Alkabetz served as president of Ahoti, until her death in 2016. Shula Keshet is the executive director. The chairwomen of the executive committee is Oshri Hayon, and the head of projects is Carmen Elmakias. Past and present members include Smadar Lavie, Flora Sasson, Esther Eillam, Henriette Dahan Kalev and Pnina Motzafi-Haller.
