= Sylvie Fogiel Bijaoui =

Israeli academic (born 1951)

- סִלביה פוגל-ביזאוי
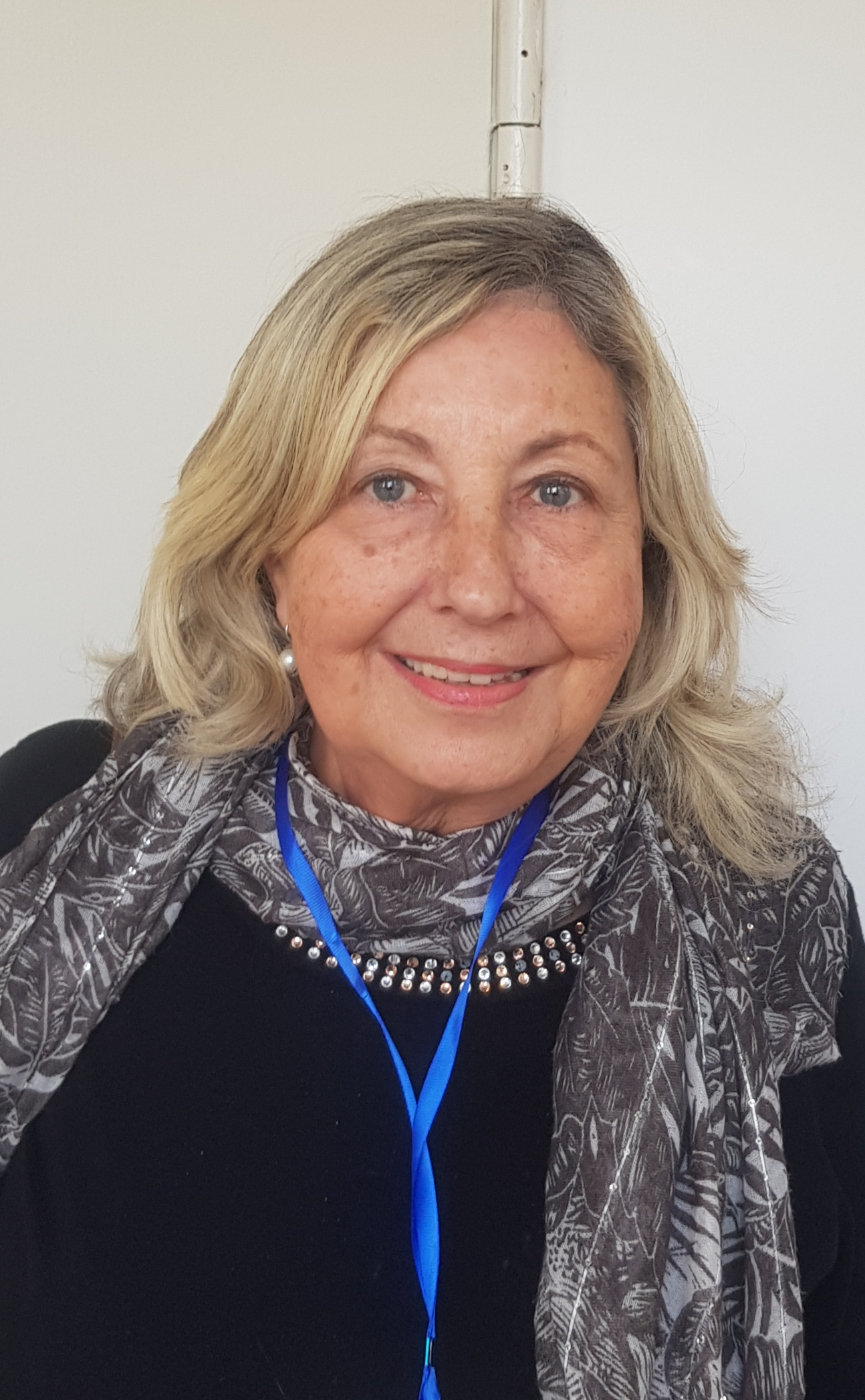
- Born: 1951 (age 74–75)

Sylvie Fogiel-Bijaoui (Hebrew: סִלביה פוגל-ביזאוי; born 1951) is a professor of sociology at College of Management in Israel. Her research is in the field of equality in the modern and post-modern era.

== Biography ==
Fogiel-Bijaoui was raised in Paris. In 1969, at the age of 18, she made aliyah to Israel and attended ulpan at Kibbutz Ma'abarot.

From 1969 to 1970, Fogiel-Bijaoui studied in an academic preparation program at Tel Aviv University. In 1973 she began, at the same university, B.A. studies in political science and sociology, and earned an M.A. in 1975. Later she continued to Ph.D. studies in political science in Paris in a combined program of School for Advanced Studies in the Social Sciences (EHESS) with Paris West University Nanterre La Défense. In 1981 she received her Ph.D. in the subject of “Feminist Movements in the Jewish Community of Palestine, 1880-1948”. Her research advisor was professor Annie Kriegel.

From 1986 to 2009, Fogiel-Bijaoui taught at Beit Berl College. From 2009 till today, she has taught at College of Management. In 2007, she established the master's degree program in family studies at the School of Behavioral Sciences in the College of Management, and headed it until 2011.

Fogiel-Bijaoui lives in Tel Aviv with her husband Ilan, an economics Ph.D. Their children are Elie, Jonathan, and Nathalie.

== Activism ==
In 1994, Fogiel-Bijaoui established the Feminist Jewish Arab Center at Beit Berl and headed it until the Second Intifada in 2002.

In 2009, she established the Family Section in the Israeli Sociological Association, and heads it with professor Orly Benjamin.

== Books ==
- Dynamics of Gender Borders: Women in Israel’s Cooperative Settlements, 2017

Guest Editor together with Reina Rutlinger Reiner: 2013 Special (double) Issue: Israel Studies Review together with the Van Leer Institute Re-thinking the Family in Israel: Individualization, Gender, Religion, and Human Rights.

Fogiel–Bijaoui, Sylvie and Rachel Sharabi. Gendering Utopia: The Social Construction of the Private and the Public Sphere in the Kibbutz and the Moshav. Hebrew University & Ramat Efal. Magnes Press & Yad Tabenkin.
