= Mizrahi feminism =

Movement within Israeli feminism representing Mizrahi women

Mizrahi feminism is a movement within Israeli feminism, which seeks to extricate Mizrahi women from the binary categories of Mizrahi-Ashkenazi and men-women. Mizrahi feminism is inspired by both Black feminism and Intersectional feminism, and seeks to bring about the liberation of women and social equality through recognition of the particular place Mizrahi women hold on the social map, and all the ways it affects Mizrahi women.

== Concepts ==
Some of the sociological research on ethnicity and gender in Israeli society describes and analyzes the ways in which Mizrahi Jews are excluded and marginalized by the Ashkenazi hegemony, as well as the ways in which women are excluded and marginalized by the patriarchal social structure, the labor market, and the state.

While Marxist feminism had previously linked the gender factor of oppression to that of class, it was Mizrahi feminism that pointed to the close relationship that exists in Israel between the class factor and the ethnic factor, and thus sought to connect more closely the sociological discourse about Mizrahim to the sociological discourse on women in Israel. The basic claim of Mizrahi feminism is that lower-class women find themselves positioned not only at the margins of the class ladder below men, but also below upper-class women. Therefore, the differences between groups of women are sometimes greater than the differences between the men and women from the same social group.

Mizrahi feminism seeks to distinguish between the category "Mizrahi women" and other categories within which they can be subsumed, as in the group "Mizrahim" and the group "women"; it also seeks to express the different and unique aspects of the identity of Mizrahi women. According to this movement, Mizrahi women possess a different life story than Ashkenazi women, one that includes subordination not only as the category of "women" but also as the category of "Mizrahim". In other words, the recognition of the unique point of intersectionality between the two.

Vicki Shiran, the founding mother of the Mizrahi feminism in Israel, wrote the following description:

In the life of a Mizrahi feminist, gender-based oppressions intersect with ethnic ones, and most often with class-based oppressions as well. Thus, she finds herself struggling on several fronts: against masculine oppression, Mizrahi-masculine oppression, the ethnic oppression by Ashkenazi women and men, and her oppressors and exploiters as a member of the lower social class. In addition, Mizrahi feminists are also acutely aware of their own oppressive position as part of the Jewish majority that oppresses the Arab-Palestinian minority, women and men alike. All of which require her to undertake a complex worldview, to look critically into herself and her actions, move seamlessly among different and conflicting identities, and, most importantly, to create a new world through non-violent eradication of the oppressive old world... Mizrahi feminism points to the mechanisms of oppression within feminism itself, which oppress and marginalize women by choosing to ignore its inherent structures of power. Mizrahi feminism thus exposes the prevalent practice of Ashkenazi feminism to articulate itself as a feminism representing all women, and to present the particular agenda of Ashkenazi women of the upper and middle classes as if it were a universal agenda reflecting the priorities of all women in Israel.

— Vicki Shiran

Mizrahi feminist academic Ktzia Alon points out that though Mizrahi feminism opens up a rich area of discourse, it also arouses deep conflict, given that both the concept of "feminism" and the concept of "Mizrahi" are mired in controversy in Israel, which when put together is greatly intensified. Henriette Dahan Kalev, out three theoretical conclusions of Mizrahi feminist analysis: "First, blindness, transparency, and exclusion of social categories are not only binary, occurring on the part of the hegemon towards the marginal groups. The phenomena of exclusion, displacement and transparency also exist between groups that are not hegemonic and within them. Marginalized and oppressed groups are not exempt from being discriminatory themselves. Second, an understanding of the difference between transparency, exclusion and marginalization is essential to arriving at the solutions required for social change, whether through legislation or political struggle.Third, legal recognition and affirmative action are conditioned upon the existence of a political struggle to pave the way for public recognition that must precede legal recognition."

The Mizrahi feminist poet Esther Shekalim wrote:

I am a woman in all my entirety, I am an Israeli, I am a Persian, I am religious, I am alone, but I would be happy to find a partner. Each of these elements is a crucial part of my identity. I am also in favor of gender equality and I most certainly write women's poetry because I know that if I do not do for my identity as a woman, no one else will do it for me."

== History ==
The 10th Feminist Conference, which took place between June 16–18, 1994 in Givat Haviva, was considered the defining event marking the birth of Mizrahi feminism in Israel.

In the 1980s and early 1990s, attempts were made to place Mizrahi feminism on the feminist agenda in Israel, in order to bring attention to the range of issues related to the unique life experiences of non-white women. The Mizrahi feminists claimed that Israeli feminism, which purports to represent all women, in fact represents only the interests of Ashkenazi women of the higher socio-economic classes, and ignores the unique problems of Mizrahi women. Mizrahi feminists also claimed that they experienced oppression and discrimination by white feminists in the course of their activities in the feminist movement. Mizrahi feminists demanded recognition of the discrimination they face on ethnic and class grounds within and outside the feminist movement, the formulation of a new feminist agenda that includes the needs and interests of Mizrahi women, and an egalitarian distribution of resources, control of decision-making and representation in the core organizations of the feminist movement, in which Ashkenazi feminists held exclusive control.

After failing in their attempts to get their issues on the feminist agenda and gain representation within the movement, a group of Mizrahi women, among them Ella Shohat, Tikva Levy, Mira Eliezer, Henriette Dahan-Kalev, Neta Amar, Vicki Shiran and others, initiated an action to "take the mic" at the 10th Feminist Conference in Givat Haviva in 1994. This time, they consciously chose a plan of actions that would ensure they could not be ignored or their issues tabled, even at the cost of open confrontation with the Ashkenazi feminists. The Mizrahi feminists engaged in angry protest at the event, and stormed the stage during the ideological debate, accusing Ashkenazi feminists of racism, oppression and exclusion, and began narrating and describing their experiences as Mizrahi in Israel. Among their stories, the women recounted how their names were taken from them and changed to Israeli names upon their arrival in Israel, the degrading treatment and racism that was and continues to be endemic to Israeli society and institutions, attitudes that pressured or forced them to deny and abandon their Arab culture and their languages of origin in order to integrate into Israeli society.

The stormy discussion that developed at the conference was conducted in high tones and with expressions of anger and outrage and the Mizrahi feminists, and the original discussion that was planned for the evening was wholly disrupted, displaced by an open battle between the participants, who were divided into two groups according to their positions on the Mizrahi issue. The Ashkenazi women, both as individuals and as representatives of such organizations as the Israel Women's Network and the Women's Voice, vehemently rejected the claims that they were partners in the oppression of Mizrahi feminists and claimed that the ethnic issue was irrelevant to feminism and that it was obsolete. The Mizrahi women, on the other hand, accused the Ashkenazi women of silencing them, and of blindness to the intersections of gender, ethnic and class identity of Mizrahi women and demanding Ashkenazi recognition that the Mizrahi and ethnic struggles also affect women's lives and should be integrated immediately into the Israeli feminist struggle.

=== The implications of the events of the conference on the Mizrahi feminist struggle ===
After the events of the conference, and the refusal of Ashkenazi feminists to recognize the demands of Mizrahi feminists, some Mizrachi women felt that they had no choice but to separate themselves from the feminist movement and to act separately. They organized the first Mizrahi feminist conference, which took place in 1996, and dealt with the history of Mizrahi oppression in Israel, including issues from the participants' childhood and until the fateful feminist conference less than two years earlier. The social and political implications of dealing face-on with the oppression, discrimination, and humiliation that were and still are the lot of the Mizrahi women included the development of Mizrahi feminist consciousness among many Mizrahi women, who had never before seen feminism as a movement that was relevant to them. Later on, after the formulation of Mizrahi feminist theory and the cohesion of the group into a solidly independent movement, the Mizrahi feminist broadened their areas of activity, whether in long-recognized areas of feminism such as legislation, education and culture, or in the founding of uniquely Mizrahi feminist organizations, the primary example of which is Achoti - for Women in Israel, which was founded in 2000 and operates according to the principles of Mizrahi feminism, providing such services as forums and workshops, a community center, a publishing house, political action, education and more.

== Issues in Mizrahi Feminism ==
Similarly to any ethnic movement, Mizrahi feminism deals with the particular oppression occurring at the intersection between Mizrahi ethnicity and gender. Some of the particular issues facing Mizrahi women in Israel, and particularly setting Mizrahi feminism apart from Ashkenazi feminism, include:

- The historical placement of Mizrahi immigrants to Israel in the geographic periphery, with all that entails, such as economic hardship, lack of access to resources, channeling of the youth to trade schools and blue collar works, and so on.
- The ability to reconcile religion, or at least Jewish tradition, with feminism. Mizrahi culture retains a closer attachment to tradition than the hegemonic Ashkenazi culture, which is largely secular. Feminism in particular was imported to Israel in the 1970s by American immigrants, and therefore was especially unprepared to include this very different group, from many perspectives, including language, workforce participation, religion, economic status and more.
- Racism and racial discrimination - schools, workplaces, politics, army (especially central to Israeli life), youth groups and other settings are still largely (if unofficially) segregated in Israel, perpetuating racial stereotypes and outright discrimination, with all its consequences - for example, there is a large disparity in the criminal prosecution and imprisonment demographics in Israel.
- In the army, alongside the Mizrahi integration into Israel. "Mizrahi" is a term almost unique to Israel, which is used to include all Jews who came to Israel from Arab or Muslim countries. However, in their countries of origin, Iraqi, Egyptian, Persian, Moroccan, Greek, Azerbaijani, Turkish and other Jewish groups, from entirely disparate countries and continents, did not necessarily share language, culture or tradition. In the Israeli "melting pot", they began to share a common fate, however - as inferior subjects, brought to Israel to do "dirty work" and help the newly-formed country. Mizrahi immigrants where therefore intentionally placed as a bulwark against Arab invasion from Jordan/Judea and Samaria, with the double purpose of keeping them away from the Ashkenazi city centers. Mizrahi youth have also been placed at the center of the conflict, as they are channeled into combat infantry units in Israel's military, placing them as the front line. For the women, the military conflict is around the roles played by husbands and sons, including ramifications such as persistent PTSD - all the while they themselves are still viewed as inferior in the wider society and their earning power is reduced.

== Inspirations ==
Mizrahi feminism draws a great deal of its inspiration from Black feminism, which seeks to abandon the universal white feminist perspective. Whereas white feminism attempts to create a universal female identity, African-American feminism posits that African-American women have a different agenda than white women, which stems from a different life story: a life story consisting of exclusion, marginalization, and social and cultural transparency. And that therefore, black women must recognize that they cannot view the entire feminist agenda through affiliation and belonging to the hegemonic social category (i.e., whites), and to ignore the existence of other categories of transparent and excluded women.

== See also ==
- Mizrahi Jews
- Haifa Women's Coalition
- Ahoti – for Women in Israel
- Feminism in Israel
- Women in Israel
- Jewish feminism
