= Grupo Feminista Renovación =

Grupo Feminista Renovación (Feminist Group Renovation; FGR), was a women's organization in Panama, founded in 1922. It was renamed Partido Nacional Feminista (PNF) (Feminist National Party) in 1923.

It was the first women's rights organization in Panama, and played an important role in the campaign for women's suffrage in Panama alongside the Sociedad Nacional para el Progreso de la Mujer (National Society for the Progress of Women).

The Feminist Group Renovation (FGR) was founded the first female lawyer in Panama, Clara Gonzalez, Sara Sotillo, Enriqueta Morales, Elida Campodónico de Crespo and Sara María Barrera, collaborating with the organization of women's schools founded that same year by Julia Palau. It was transformed in to the Partido Nacional Feminista (PNF) (Feminist National Party) in 1923, which has been referred to as the first feminist party in Latin America, and had a close association with the American women's movement. It worked for women's equal rights in law, economy and political suffrage.

The 1941 Constitution of Panama finally approved conditional suffrage for literate women; both men and women were allowed to vote by the Decree No. 12 of 2 February 1945, when the first women, Esther Neira de Calvo and Gumersinda Paez, was elected to parliament; the reform was finally fully implemented in the 1946 Constitution.
