= Elida Campodónico =

- Born: Elida Luisa Campodónico Moreno; 6 August 1894; Macaracas, Los Santos Province, Department of Panama, Colombia
- Died: 6 January 1960 (aged 65); Panama City, Panama
- Other name: Elida Luisa Campodónico de Crespo
- Occupations: teacher, women's rights advocate, attorney
- Years active: 1919–1960
- Known for: First woman ambassador in Latin America

Elida Luisa Campodónico Moreno (6 August 1894 – 6 January 1960) was a Panamanian teacher, women's rights advocate, and attorney. She was one of the founders of the National Feminist Party of Panama and worked for women to gain voting rights. She established the Panamanian branch of La Gota de Leche and was the second woman in Panama to become an attorney. After women won the right to vote, Campodónico joined the diplomatic corps and became the first woman ambassador in Latin America, when she was appointed as Panama's ambassador to Mexico in 1952.

== Early life and education ==
Elida Luisa Campodónico Moreno was born on 6 August 1894 in Macaracas, Los Santos Province, Department of Panama, Colombia to Josefa María Moreno and José Campodónico. Her mother was Panamanian and the daughter of a doctor, Manuel Balbino Moreno; her father was a merchant and rancher of Italian provenance. When she was nine years old, in 1903, Panama gained its independence from Colombia. She completed her primary education in La Villa de los Santos and then went to Panama City to complete her secondary schooling at the Catholic girls' school Santa María. With her brother, Domiluis, Campodónico journeyed to Bellinzona in the Swiss Canton of Ticino in the Italian Alps to study education. In 1919, she received a master's of education for teaching kindergarten and primary school, as well as certificates for teaching French, Italian, and Spanish. Returning to Panama City, she began teaching as the professor of geography and history at the teacher's training school. She soon married José Daniel Crespo, an educator. Because their teaching methods were seen as too progressive, the couple were dismissed from the school. Together they set up the first school to train kindergarten teachers. The school utilized the Montessori method and was operated out of the couple's home.

== Political activity ==
In 1923, Campodónico joined with Otilia Arosemena de Tejeira, Clara González, Enriqueta Morales, and Sara Sotillo to found the National Feminist Party (Spanish: Partido Nacional Feminista) (PNF) and the National Society for Women's Progress (Spanish: Sociedad Nacional para el Progreso de la Mujer). She served as Vice President of the PNF. The following year, the women with Rosa Navas established the School of Feminist Culture (Spanish: Escuela de Cultura Femenina) to provide lectures on civics, history, and politics, preparing women for professional and societal participation. The goal of all the organizations was to enable women to participate in civil, economic, social, and political aspects of the Panamanian society. During this period, Campodónico also helped establish a Panamanian branch of La Gota de Leche, a humanitarian organization aimed at providing milk for undernourished children.

== Legal career and campaigning ==
In the 1930s, after having four children, Campodónico began attending the Free School of Law (Spanish: Escuela Libre de Derecho) of Panama. In 1935, she became the second Panamanian woman to graduate with a law degree—the first being Clara González—with a thesis titled La delincuencia de la mujer en Panamá (The Crime of Women in Panama). Campodónico became a litigator, fighting for the rights of women and children. She actively fought for women's suffrage, founding and editing the journal Feminist Renewal (Spanish: Feminista Renovación). With other feminists, she presented a petition with 2,000 signatures to the National Assembly of Panama demanding the right to vote and amendments to the Civil Code to establish a Juvenile Court System, as well as industrial schools and laws to protect working women. Their plea went unanswered, but a law was passed establishing a system for citizens to obtain an identity card. The PNF demanded cards for their membership. In 1936 when Campodónico, González, and Arosemena called on the secretary to protest their inability to obtain an identity card, he famously replied, "En Panamá no hay ciudadanas, sino ciudadanos" (In Panama there are no female citizens, only male citizens.)

In response, PNF presented another petition to the National Assembly for reform of the election laws, but it failed to move forward. Frustrated, the women proposed to hold a Congress in 1938 to work towards reforming the legal code, but it was blocked by President Arosemena. In July, 1941 a series of laws had been passed which effectively took away Panamanian women's citizenship, while at the same time offering them limited voting rights in provincial councils, if they were literate. Then in 1941, a coup d'état against Arnulfo Arias led to instability and the need to form a new Constitutional Assembly. On December 31, 1944, González founded the National Women's Union, (Spanish: Unión Nacional de Mujeres) (UNM) with Campodónico on the administrative board. González, as a representative of UNM ran to be a delegate in the assembly. She did not win a seat, but Gumercinda Páez and Esther Neira de Calvo were elected as part of the Constitutional Assembly, and finally women in Panama won the right to vote.

== Roles in government and later life ==
Campodónico was appointed to the Ministry of Foreign Affairs of the UNM and worked as the legal representative for several trade unions including the Panamanian Teachers Union. In 1952, she was the first woman to be appointed as ambassador in Latin America, serving as Panama's ambassador to Mexico. After retiring from the diplomatic service, she returned to Panama where she worked in business until her death on 6 January 1960 in Panama City.
