= Sociedad Nacional para el Progreso de la Mujer =

Women's organisation in Panama

Sociedad Nacional para el Progreso de la Mujer (National Society for the Progress of Women) was a women's organization in Panama, founded in 1923.

It played an important role in the campaign for women's suffrage in Panama, working alongside the Grupo Feminista Renovación under the leadership of Esther Neira de Calvo. It advocated for women's equal rights in law, the economy, and political suffrage.

The 1941 Constitution of Panama finally approved conditional suffrage for literate women. However, it was not until Decree No. 12 of 2 February 1945 that both men and women were granted the right to vote. This decree led to the election of the first two women, Esther Neira de Calvo and Gumersinda Paez, to parliament; the reform was finally fully implemented in the 1946 Constitution.
