= Tomasa Ester Casís =

- Born: Tomasa Ester Casís Tuñón; 21 December 1878; Panama
- Died: 1962 (aged 83–84); Panama City, Panama
- Other names: Tomasa E. Casís, Tomasita Esther Casís
- Occupation(s): teacher, women's rights activist

Tomasa Ester Casís (21 December 1878 – 1962) was a Panamanian teacher and woman's rights activist. She founded the first women's cultural society in the country and pressed for women's equality. Supporting suffrage, she was one of the pioneering feminists of Panama and was honored as a commander in the Order of Vasco Núñez de Balboa for her educational contributions to the country.

== Early life ==
Tomasa Ester Casís Tuñón was born on 21 December 1878 in Panama to Benita Tuñón and José Manuel Casís. She attended primary school at the Escuela de San Felipe de Niñas (San Felipe Girls' School) No. 2 and then studied at the Colegio Pestaloziano, a secondary school, directed María Luisa Munévar de Cristofini. She graduated in 1896, along with Emilia Alba and Delfina Sucre. After winning a scholarship to attend the Escuela Normal de Institutoras (Normal School Institute) led by Rosa and Matilde Rubiano, she trained to become a teacher, graduating with her degree in 1900.

== Career ==
Upon graduation, Casís was appointed as the boys' preparatory teacher at the Colegio Secundario del Istmo (Secondary College of the Isthmus). She worked there for three years before becoming a teacher at the Escuela de San Felipe de Niños (San Felipe Boys' School) for which she became the director in 1905. Casís was hired as a preparatory teacher at the Escuela Superior de Señoritas (Superior School for Girls) in 1906 and worked there until 1907, when she was offered a post at a school which was just opening. The girls' school Escuela de Santa Ana No. 2 (Santa Ana School) allowed her a chance to develop new educational ideas based on her pedagogical training. As it was a new school, it also became a testing ground for her organizational skills, as she had to recruit students from the neighborhood. She believed in equal opportunities for schooling and pressed for the creation of the first kindergarten in the country, which was opened by Juana Oller.

In 1916, Casís, along with other teachers, founded the first women's cultural society in Panama, Club Ariel. The organization promoted women's education and political involvement. She also joined the Sociedad Nacional para el Progreso de la Mujer (National Society for the Progress of Women, SNPM), established in 1923 by Esther Neira de Calvo. The goals of the SNPM were to elevate women's awareness of their value to society, train them in the responsibilities of citizenship and promote equality. Casís, Angélica Chávez de Patterson, and Aminta de Osses served on the SNPM's Educational Committee Board. Though she had built the Santa Ana School into a well-respected institution, in 1926, the school was merged into the Centro Amador Guerrero (Amador Guerrero Center) and Casís began working as the director at the Escucla "República de Cuba" (Republic of Cuba School). She worked there until her retirement in 1928. In 1960, she was honored as a Commander of the Order of Vasco Núñez de Balboa for her contributions to Panamanian education.

== Death and legacy ==
Casís died in Panama City in 1962. She is remembered for having educated generations of Panamanian women, including Lidia Gertrudis Sogandares, the first woman physician in the country and Gumercinda Páez, one of the first woman deputies to serve the National Assembly.
