= Coqui Calderón =

Panamanian visual artist (1937–2025)

- Born: Constancia Calderón de Augrain; 17 January 1937; Panama City, Panama
- Died: 26 December 2025 (aged 88); Panama
- Education: Rosemont College
- Occupation: Visual artist

Constancia Calderón de Augrain (17 January 1937 – 26 December 2025) was a Panamanian visual artist. She was a recipient of the Order of Vasco Núñez de Balboa (1983).

Augrain died in Panama on 26 December 2025, at the age of 88.
