= Order of Omar Torrijos Herrera =

Order of Omar Torrijos Herrera Orden de Omar Torrijos Herrera
- Type: Order
- Country: Panama
- Gran Maestre: President of Panama
- Gran Canciller: Minister of Foreign Affairs
- Ribbon of the order

The Order of Omar Torrijos Herrera is an order of Panama, named in honor of Omar Torrijos Herrera (1929-1981), who was the Commander of Panamanian Forces of the Panamanian Revolution. It was created by Act No. 23 on 14 December, 1982 and regulated by Executive Decree No. 336 of 13 July, 1995. The regulation was amended by Executive Decree No. 1 of 11 January, 2006.

== Classes and ranks ==
The award is split into civilian and military classes. The civilian class consists of four ranks:

- Extraordinary Grand Cross (Gran Cruz Extraordinaria)
- Grand Cross (Gran Cruz)
- Trustee with plaque (Encomienda con Placa)
- Commander (Comendador)

The military class has three ranks:

- Grand Officer Cross (Gran Cruz de Oficial)
- Grand Silver Cross (Gran Cruz de Plata)
- Knight (Caballero)

== Notable recipients ==
- Rod Carew
- Fidel Castro
- Luiz Inácio Lula da Silva
- Marta Matamoros, Grand Cross
- Cirilo McSween, Extraordinary Grand Cross
- Tabaré Vázquez
