= Enriqueta Morales =

- Born: Enriqueta Ramona Morales Bermúdez; 29 March 1891; Panama City, Colombia
- Died: 10 November 1986 (aged 95); Panama City, Panama
- Other names: Enriqueta Morales Bermúdez
- Occupations: nurse, feminist
- Years active: 1922–1950

Enriqueta Morales (29 March 1891 – 10 November 1986) was a Panamanian nurse and feminist, who was instrumental in creating social service organizations in the country. Trained abroad in Belgium, she returned to Panama and founded feminist organizations aimed at improving the socio-economic and political status of women in the country. Becoming the superintendent of the Red Cross in the mid-1920s, she oversaw the creation of medical facilities and institutions to help women, children and the poor. Spending the years of World War II assisting the Allied Forces, she returned to Panama and served as the Secretary of the Ministry of Social Welfare, Labor and Public Health until 1950. She was a recipient of the medal Pro Ecclesia et Pontifice, for her dedication to Catholic causes.

== Early life ==
Enriqueta Ramona Morales Bermúdez was born on 29 March 1891 in Panama City, during the time when Panama was part of the Republic of Gran Colombia to Enriqueta Bermúdez and Eusebio A. Morales. Her father was an economist and noted politician and her mother raised their three boys and three daughters in a liberal home, encouraging the children's education. Morales attended the school run by the Sisters of San Vicente de Colón and then completed her schooling at the private school Colegio de San José, run by Marina Ucrós and her sisters, Josefa and Teresa, in Panama City. After Panama gained its independence from Colombia, Morales became one of the first group of women who were granted scholarships by the national government to further their education abroad. She moved to Brussels, Belgium and studied pedagogy at the Ursuline Institute in nearby Wavre-Notre-Dame.

During her studies in Belgium, she became involved in feminist causes and social reforms, and attended training courses to become a nurse with the Belgian Red Cross. After completing her schooling, she moved to the United States, where her father was serving as an ambassador.

== Career ==
Returning to Panama in the early 1920s, Morales directed the kindergarten at the School Annex of the Normal Institute. In 1922, she became one of the founders of the Feminist Renewal Center Foundation (Spanish: Fundación del Centro Feminista Renovación), which aimed to reform the socio-economic and political spheres of Panamanian women. The following year, the center led the way for the creation of the National Feminist Party, by Clara González and founding members included Morales, Otilia Arosemena de Tejeira, Elida Campodónico, and Sara Sotillo. The aim of the political organization was to not only attain the vote, but to establish laws to protect and provide for women and children. They focused on issues such as education and equal pay for women, the need for juvenile courts and laws to address prostitution. Also in 1923, this same group of women founded the National Society for Women's Progress (Spanish: Sociedad Nacional para el Progreso de la Mujer, to further their ideals of social maternalism—improving the family and society as a whole using the nurturing instincts of mothers.

After two years at the kindergarten, around 1924, Morales became the secretary of the Panamanian branch of the Red Cross, which had been founded by Matilde Obarrio de Mallet in 1917. She also worked as the head nurse of the Hospital Santo Tomás. When Obarrio retired and moved to England with her husband, the British diplomat Claude Coventry Mallet, Morales became the Red Cross superintendent. In 1926, she attended the Pan-American Conference of Women as a delegate from the Red Cross. As superintendent, Morales coordinated charitable activities of institutions which received state subsidies and through her initiative successfully created school lunch rooms, prenatal and postnatal clinics, and free pharmacies. She also founded the Red Cross kindergarten and daycare center known as the Casa Cuna, as well as institutions to care for tubercular and leprosy patients, orphans, and the poor. Morales was awarded the medal Pro Ecclesia et Pontifice by Pope Pius XI for her dedication to Catholic causes and public service and remained as Red Cross Superintendent until 1940.

In 1941, Morales moved to the United States, serving as a nurse for the Allied Forces during World War II, remaining until 1944. During this time, she also became a contributor to numerous newspapers, writing regular chronicles for Diario de Panamá, El Tiempo, and La Estrella de Panamá. Returning to Panama, she was elected as president of the Ladies Federation of Catholic Action and the following year in 1945, she worked with the Feminine Patriotic League to encourage women to utilize their newly attained right to vote. In 1947, Morales was appointed as the Secretary of the Ministry of Social Welfare, Labor and Public Health and retained the post until 1950, when Arnulfo Arias became the President of Panama.

== Death ==
Morales died on 10 November 1986 in Panama City. She is remembered for her dedication to women and children, as well as the pivotal role she played in the Red Cross.
