= Confederación Sindical Obrera y Agraria =

Trade union centre in Panama

Confederación Sindical Obrera y Agraria ('Labour and Agrarian Trade Union Confederation') was a trade union centre in Panama, founded in 1930 through the merger of Federación Obrera de la República and Sindicato General de los Trabajadores.

Clara González was the general secretary of the division of female and child labour of the organization.
