= Cuban Hebrew Congregation =

Synagogue in Miami Beach, Florida

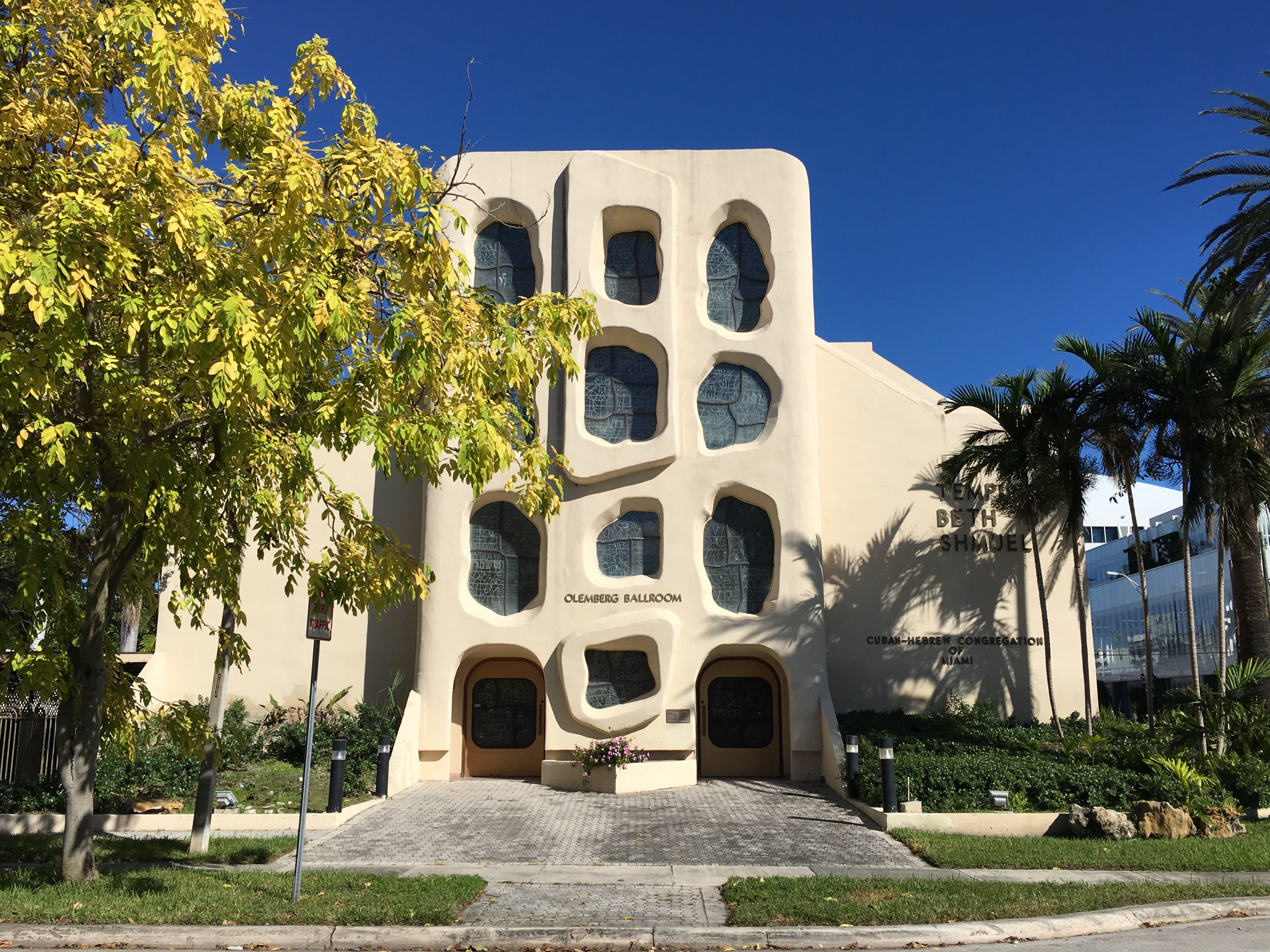
- Temple Beth Shmuel

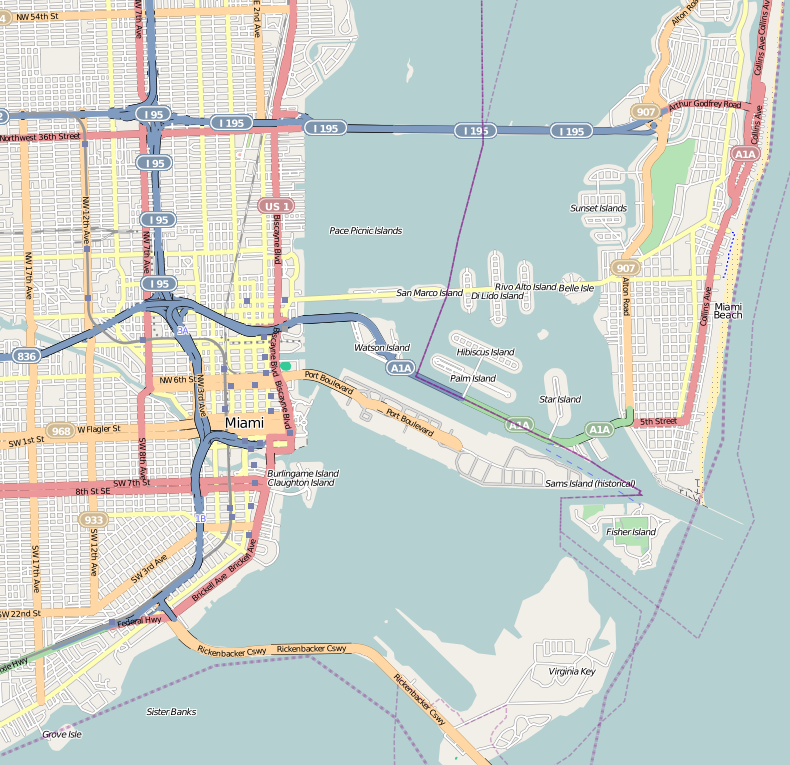
- Location within Miami Beach

Religion
- Affiliation: Conservative Judaism
- Rite: Nusach Ashkenaz
- Ecclesiastical or organisational status: Synagogue
- Status: Active

Location
- Location: 1700 N. Michigan Avenue, Miami Beach, Florida
- Country: United States
- Coordinates: 25°47′32.3″N 80°8′22.3″W

Architecture
- Architect: Oscar Sklar
- Type: Synagogue
- Established: 1961 (as a congregation)
- Completed: 1975; 1982

Website
- www.cubanhebrew.com

The Cuban Hebrew Congregation, or Temple Beth Shmuel, is a Conservative synagogue used by Ashkenazi Jewish Cuban expatriates, located at 1700 North Michigan Avenue, Miami Beach, Florida, in the United States.

== Overview ==
"Approximately 94 percent of Cuba’s Jewish population fled after the [1959] Revolution."

The synagogue was founded in 1961 by Felix Reyler, Oscar White, and Bernardo Benes. Its current location at 1700 North Michigan Avenue, Miami Beach, Florida, in the United States opened in 1975, with an expansion in 1982. The congregation is led by Rabbi Stephen Texon and Baal Koreh Jacques Malka. It currently hosts 170 member households and has a Montessori School.

The temple was designed by Oscar Sklar and includes stained glass windows of the Twelve Tribes of Israel designed by Inge Pape Trampler. Mexican artist Naomi Siegman designed the candelabras beside the bimah. The synagogue is named for Shmuel Schacter, father of Jack Chester.
