= Bernardo Benes =

Cuban lawyer, banker, and journalist (1934–2019)

Dr. Bernardo Benes Baikowitz (27 December 1934 in Matanzas, Cuba – 14 January 2019 in Miami, Florida) was a prominent Jewish Cuban lawyer, banker, journalist and civic leader, who was responsible for freeing 3,600 Cuban political prisoners in 1978.

== Early life ==
Bernardo Benes Baikowitz was born on December 27, 1934, in Mantanzas, Cuba, to Boris Benes and Dora Baikowitz. Boris Benes was a Russian immigrant to Cuba, leaving the Soviet Union in 1923, with a friend of his father's. Bernardo Benes’ family was Jewish, and most left behind were exterminated in Nazi Concentration Camps.

His father had arrived with only $20, yet managed to start his own clothing store in the streets of Cuba and Spain. Later, Bernardo Benes and his family would move to Havana, the capital of Cuba. As he was Jewish, Benes had to study Hebrew Culture and Yiddish, and joined the Hashomer Hatzair, which influenced his sense of morality and human rights.

His ideology would develop mostly during his childhood, with a lot of influence from Boris Benes who not only to Benes was a model as a hard worker but as a man of humility and honesty.

Bernardo Benes would, as a college student, at first joined the University of Maryland, but left because he found the facilities unsatisfactory. He would later join the law school in the University of Havana. From there, through friends like José Antonio Echeverría "Manzanita", he would be exposed to student demonstrations against the Batista regime in the 1950s. With influences like Osmel Francis da los Reyes and René Anillo, Bernardo Benes would participate in activities of the revolution, joining activities of the Revolutionary Student Directorate. Dr. Benes graduated as an attorney and CPA from the University of Havana, and later became a member of the law firm “Bufete Zaydin”. Bernardo Benes would also later become the Consultant Lawyer of the Ministry of Finance after Fidel Castro's revolution succeeded.

But the executions of the Batista officials and the imprisonment of Castro's past supporters or those against the revolution led Benes to flee Castro's regime. His father's company was expropriated by the Castro government. Instead of a capitalist state, there was now a communist state. Bernardo Benes and his family fled to Miami in 1960, to start a new life in a place that would become the epicenter of Latin America.

== Early years in exile ==
In Miami, Bernardo Benes would start with a check of $210, becoming a janitor for a bank. But he would quickly rise until he owned his own bank in 1974, while also becoming a major figure in the Cuban exile community. This was partly due to all the charitable activities he participated in, mostly for helping Cuban Americans with housing and finance or giving advice on finance and politics. He would become a very prominent figure in the Miami Community, with 29 organizations listed on his résumé. One of his first roles in the community was starting a snack booth at the airport when Pedro Pan flights started, greeting newly arrived Cuban exiles. Along with that, he co-founded the Cuban Hebrew Congregation on Miami Beach in 1961, the United Way International in his community(Vice-President for the Miami-Dade County from 1965-1977). From 1962–1974, he was Vice-President of the Washington Federal Savings and Loan Association, housing consultant to USAID, IDB (Interamerican Development Bank), and the United Nations.

He was leaning towards exile militancy at the start of his Miami career, having funded anti-Castro missions like the one in which Tony Cuesta was captured. But he became a more compromise based idealist when his radio plan of broadcasting to Cuba was rejected by the U.S. government. He looked at this event as telling him that he could accomplish nothing if he kept this type of more aggressive path, which relied too much on support from the government, when the Cuban exiles should take it into their own hands.

Bernardo Benes during this time would be influenced by a friend who wanted to, through Benes, publish an article about the inhumane treatment of political prisoners in Cuba. This would be Bernardo Benes’ turning point, and human rights (freeing the political prisoners and reuniting exiled families) would become his goal. Because of his religion, Bernardo Benes would also comment that this was his duty as a Jewish man to work for human rights. During this time, it was also Jimmy Carter's presidential election, and Benes would avidly support Carter, giving him a closer connection to the U.S. government.

All of these aspects would help Bernardo Benes in starting and continuing his negotiations with Fidel Castro.

== Involvement in dialogues ==
Bernardo Benes’ negotiations began on August 22, 1977. Benes was on vacation with his family in Panama after being invited by the future Vice President Ricardo de la Espriella, his old friend. He was eating breakfast when one of his old friends, Alberto Pons, told him some Cubans wanted to meet Bernardo Benes. They turned out to be top officials of Castro's inner circle, who wanted to use Benes as a bridge to reach diplomatic relations. Two of them were José Luis Padrón and Antonio de la Guardia. After this meeting, Bernardo Benes would contact Larry Sternfield, a CIA agent who he was well acquainted with, who told him who the men were, while telling Benes to continue to meet with them. Bernardo Benes would bring with him Charles Dascal, one of the first people he told about the Panama meeting.

After a meeting between the Cuban officials and Benes in February 1978, Bernardo Benes would hand a memorandum to Zbigniew Brzezinski, the National Security Advisor for Carter. Brzezinski and Benes would have a rocky start, and Brzezinski would find Benes unfit for the role, sending two of his own men to continue conversations. But Benes would talk to Cyrus Vance (Secretary of State) and Peter Tarnoff, with the FBI instead of the CIA now instructing Benes.

The negotiations between the Cuban officials and Bernardo Benes happened in Panama, Nassau, Mexico, Jamaica, Washington D.C., and New York, totaling up to around 75 meetings. In these conversations, Bernardo Benes and Charles Dascal negotiated for the freedom of the political prisoners, family reunification, and more peaceful relations between the United States and Cuba.

Bernardo Benes also had around 14 personal meetings with Fidel Castro, more than 150 hours total, continuing with discussions about human rights. In these meetings, many differences in American and Cuban Culture during the Cold War can be seen. For example, during one of the meetings, Bernardo Benes noticed Castro had Florsheim boots worth more than a hundred dollars. When asking Castro why he wore these low-quality boots, Castro was surprised and replied he thought they were one of the best. Bernardo Benes would later buy Johnston and Murphy boots for $350, which Castro gladly accepted. Many more moments like this would occur, where the development of the United States and the Miami community abroad would surprise Castro.

On October 20, 1978, Benes and five other Cuban exiles would arrive in Cuba to bring 46 prisoners back to Miami. In the time that they spent there, the press got to interview the prisoners at the Combinado del Este prison, meeting with Eloy Gutierrez Menoyo, one of the more famous prisoners. They would during this time have a meeting with Fidel Castro. One of the released would be Tony Cuesta.

Bernardo Benes after the one in October had two more “dialogues”, bringing more exiles to meet Castro, and bringing even more prisoners back in November and December. Castro promised to release 3,600 prisoners and issue permits so families could visit the family members they were separated from. Carter would also remove human rights as one of the reasons stopping the U.S. from restoring diplomatic relations with Cuba.

== After negotiations ==
But there were multiple complications that came with Bernardo Benes' negotiations. For one, prisoners were being released at a slower rate than agreed on because the U.S. failed to give enough permits, which was caused by the Attorney General not willing to grant visas unless all prisoners were interviewed. During the Reagan years, this process will halt until another deal between Reagan and Castro was reached. Along with that in the Reagan years, visits to Cuba would also be minimalized, though later restored.

Another thing that damaged the result of the negotiations is the Mariel Boatlift. The Mariel Boatlift brought 125,000 Cuban refugees including released criminals and mental patients. This would damage Carter's image and be one of the reasons he lost the election. The crime in Miami where most of the refugees came to would increase, while the people couldn't be absorbed into the labor market. This would greatly damage the image of the Cubans exiles. But as the years passed, the refugees were accepted and integrated.

But Bernardo Benes was ostracized rather than put in the spotlight as a hero. Militant exile groups like Alpha 66 viewed Benes as a traitor to them, having talked to Castro. Two of the people who participated in the dialogue were assassinated, while Benes had to wear a bulletproof vest the first year after his negotiations. Benes would constantly be under fire by the media, with radios and newspaper writing against him. Many old friends of his would avoid him or treat him rudely. Often, when he walked into a restaurant, one of the customers would try to spit at or insult him. He survived possibly two assassination attempts, and a bomb exploding at the bank he worked at.

== Death ==
Bernardo Benes died on January 14, 2019, after suffering for around three years from a disease. He had a private funeral, remaining mostly unknown to the public. He was still never accepted into the community and had trouble finding work for the rest of his life. But his work lives on as Obama restored diplomatic relations during his terms in office, though the embargo on Cuba still remains. Fidel Castro and most of his supporters have also died.

== Awards, honors, positions and documents ==
He was given an Honorary Doctoral Degree in Human Relations in 1968 from Biscayne College (now St. Thomas University). In 1969, the Republic of Panama awarded him the Order of Vasco Nunez de Balboa for his humanitarian contributions and in 1979, the order of the Vatican Condecoration for Human Rights. He is an adjunct professor at the University of Miami. His papers from 1956-1987 are held by the Cuban Heritage Collection of the University of Miami Libraries. One of these documents is an unpublished memoir called “Mis Conversaciones Secretas con Fidel Castro”. A book from 2001, Secret Missions to Cuba, is a biography of Bernardo Benes and events related to him.

- Order of Vasco Nunez de Balboa 1969
- Order of the Vatican Condecoration for Human Right 1979
- Honorary Doctoral Degree in Human Relations, Biscayne College 1968
