= Order of Vasco Núñez de Balboa =

Order of Vasco Núñez de Balboa Orden de Vasco Núñez de Balboa
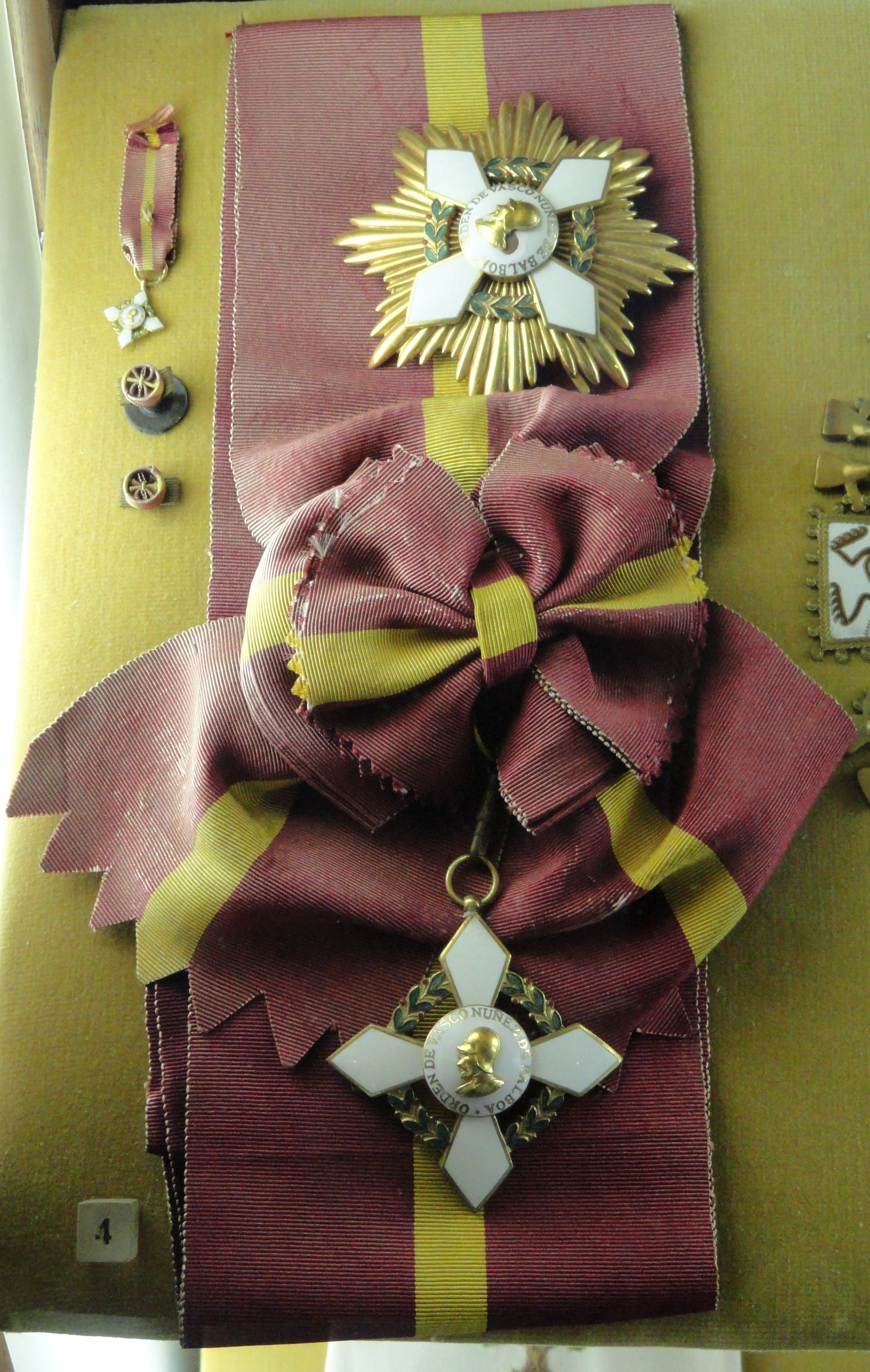
- Type: Order
- Country: Panama
- Gran Maestre: President of Panama
- Gran Canciller: Minister of Foreign Affairs

Precedence
- Next (higher): Order of Manuel Amador Guerrero
- Next (lower): Order of the Gray Falcon
- Ribbon of the order

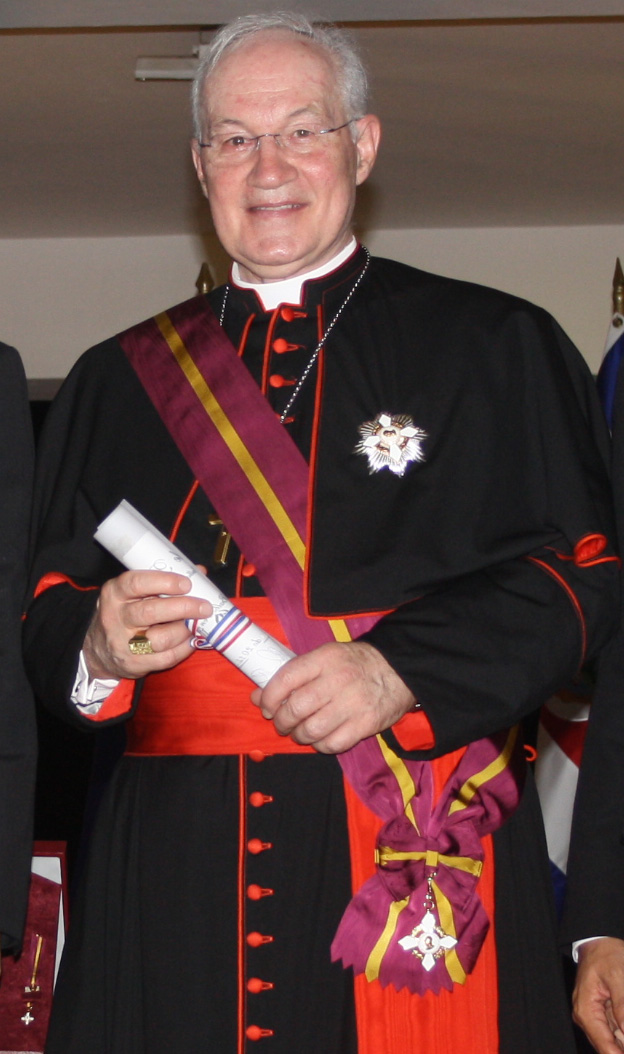
Cardinal Marc Ouellet wearing the sash and insignia of the order, 2012

The Order of Vasco Núñez de Balboa is an order of Panama, instituted on 1 July 1941 (Ley No. 94 de 1 de julio de 1941). It is awarded for distinguished diplomatic services and contributions to international relations between Panama and other states.

It is named after the Spanish conquistador, Vasco Núñez de Balboa.

== Ranks ==
There are 5 ranks in the order:

- Extraordinary Grand Cross (Gran Cruz Extraordinaria)
- Grand Cross (Gran Cruz)
- Grand Officer (Gran Oficial)
- Commander (Comendador)
- Knight (Caballero)

== Insignia ==
The ribbon is purple with a yellow central stripe.

Ribbon bars
Extraordinary Grand Cross	Grand Cross	Grand Officer	Commander	Knight

== Notable recipients ==
- Extraordinary Grand Crosses
  - Juan Carlos I of Spain
  - Óscar Osorio
- Grand Crosses
  - Albert II, Prince of Monaco
  - Miguel Alemán Velasco
  - Henry H. Arnold
  - Cristian Barros
  - Prince Carlo, Duke of Castro
  - Andrés Carrascosa Coso (2017)
  - Jimmy Carter
  - Jacques Diouf
  - Dwight D. Eisenhower
  - Felipe VI of Spain
  - Guillermo Fernández de Soto
  - William Halsey Jr.
  - Kenneth I. Juster
  - Queen Letizia of Spain
  - Marc Ouellet
  - Harry Radhakishun
  - Queen Sofía of Spain
- Grand Officers
  - Guy Harvey
  - George Joulwan
  - Ray E. Porter
  - John F. Shafroth Jr.
  - Harold C. Train
  - Ester Neira de Calvo
  - Li Ka-shing
- Commanders
  - José Arce
  - Tomasa Ester Casís
  - Hector P. Garcia
  - Allan L. Goldstein
  - Edward Hanson
  - Ernest King
  - Gladys de la Lastra
  - Flor María Araúz
  - María Olimpia de Obaldía
  - Thomas W. Stukel
  - Col. William André Wedemeyer
- Knights
  - Alicia Alonso
  - Bernardo Benes
  - Coqui Calderón
  - Ruth Fernández
  - Samuel Lewis Galindo
  - Sigfrido A. Muller Espino
  - Carlos Morales Troncoso
  - Ernest TC-Singh
