= Sara Sotillo =

Sara Sotillo Guillén
- Born: 19 April 1900; San Miguel, Panama Department, Colombia
- Died: 16 December 1961 (aged 61); Panama City, Panama
- Occupations: Educator and feminist

Sara Sotillo Guillén (April 19, 1900 – December 16, 1961) was a Panamanian educator, feminist, and founder of the National Feminist Party of Panama.

== Early life and education ==
Sotillo was born in 1900 in the city of San Miguel on the Panamanian island of Isla del Rey, which is part of the Pearl Islands, to Braulio Sotillo and Bathilia Guillen. She was the youngest of three siblings. While still very young, her family moved to Panama City, at that time still part of Isthmus Department, a subdivision of Gran Colombia . She graduated normal school at age 19 in 1919 and worked as a teacher in Garachiné, in the province of Darien. She soon transferred to the School Manuel José Hurtado in Panama City, where she would work for the next 29 years.

== Career and activism ==
In 1922, with fellow female Panamanian academics including Clara González, Enriqueta Morales, Elida Campodónico, and Sara Maria Barrera, she helped create the National Feminist Party (PNF: Partido Nacional Feminista), for which she served as the second vice president, succeeding Campodónico.

In 1923 she co-founded the Women's National Party, which she led. In 1925 the Women's National Party submitted to the National Assembly a memorial in which social and political demands were made for the benefit of women. The document was instrumental in addressing and reforming the legal status and economic situation of women in Panama.

In 1944 she founded the United Teachers Association of Panama, a teachers union that came to play an important role in the legislation of education, most notably in the drafting and passing of Law 47 in 1946, the "Organic Education" Law. In order to combat the high rate of illiteracy existing in the country, in 1948 Sotillo directed the first mass literacy campaign aimed primarily at Panamas adult population, for which she drew up teaching curricula called ALAS, which were published in the Daily Panama America and La Estrella de Panamá.

She was active in the vehement and ultimately successful nationalist opposition to the Filos-Hines Agreement of 1947, a military convention ratified by the Panamanian Minister of Foreign Affairs, Francisco Filos, and the Ambassador of the United States, General Frank T. Hines, both acting under the approval of their respective presidents: Enrique Adolfo Jiménez and Harry S. Truman. The convention would have granted a ten-year renewable period for the United States to operate military bases in over a dozen locations in Panama. The overwhelming public outcry at the proposal lead the National Assembly to reject the Agreement in December 1948.

== Personal life ==
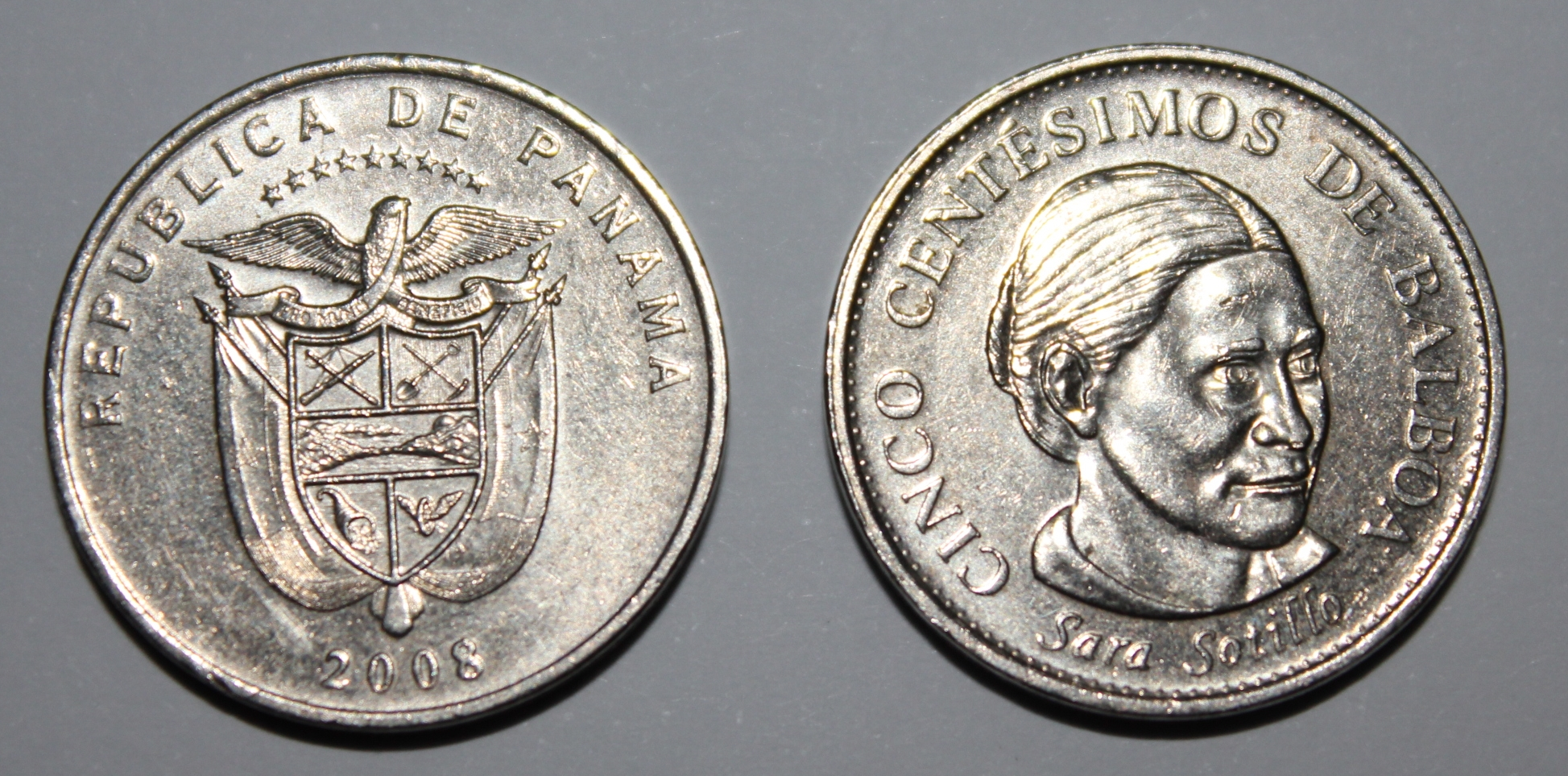
5/100 balboa coin minted in 2008 in honor of Sotillo

Sotillo was unmarried throughout her life, and as such never had children. She lived modestly with her salary as a teacher, which was about $50 USD. She consistently rejected offers of promotions or other such advancements - both academic and political, including legislative positions in the National Assembly.

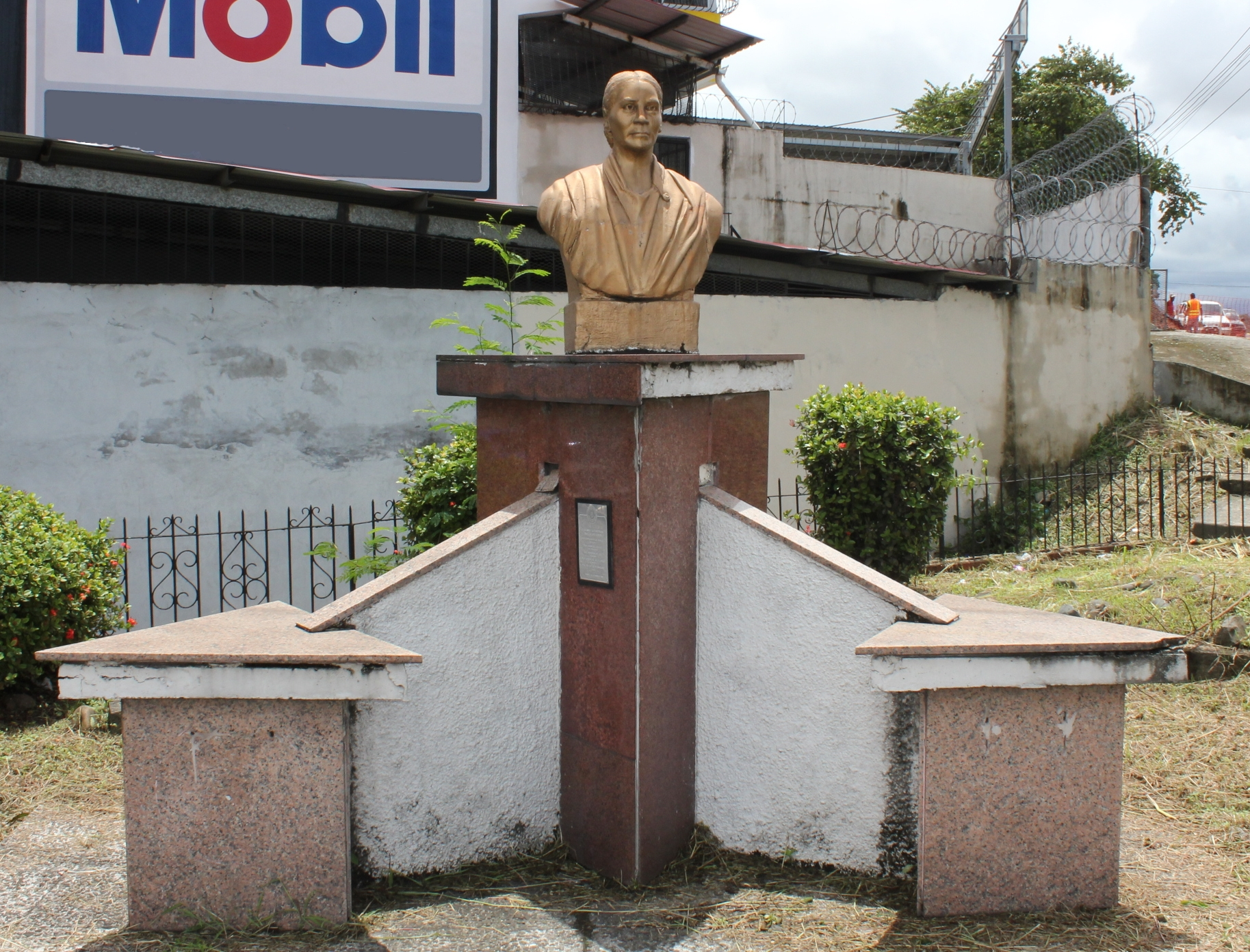
Bust of Sara Sotillo in the township of Betania, Panama .

She died on December 16, 1961. Her funeral was held at Church of Christ the King in Panama City, in which thousands of people marched in the funeral procession. She is buried in Amador Cemetery in Panama City.

== Legacy ==
Sotillo was honored in 2001 by the Panamanian Government with the minting of a special series of 5 centésimos coins featuring Sotillos' image on the front; she was also honored that same year with a bust of her likeness erected in Betania, Panama City.

She was posthumously awarded the Order of Manuel José Hurtado, one of the highest accolades available to educators and academics in Panama.
