= Gumercinda Páez =

Panamanian politician

- Born: Gumercinda Páez Villarreal; 13 January 1904; Panama City, Panama
- Died: 1991 (aged 86–87); Veracruz, Panama
- Occupations: Educator, suffragist, politician, writer
- Years active: 1919–1951

Gumercinda Páez (1904–1991) was a teacher, women's rights activist and suffragette, and Constituent Assemblywoman of Panama. She was the first woman deputy to serve the National Assembly for the Panamá Province and was a vice president of the Constituent Assembly of Panama in 1946, being also the first woman to serve in that position. As a woman of mixed heritage, she was acutely aware of bias and strove for policies of inclusion.

== Biography ==
=== Early life ===
Gumercinda Páez was born on 13 January 1904 in Panama City, Panama to Jose Antonio Páez, a Venezuelan of African descent and Mercedes Villarreal, a Panamanian with indigenous roots. Growing up in the Santa Ana neighborhood, she attended the Escuela Santa Ana No. 2, which was directed by Tomasa Ester Casís. She attended high school at the National Institute of Panama, where she obtained a diploma as a securities trade expert, going on to study science and earning a certificate to teach primary education. In a 1985 interview, Páez explained that when her father died, she became the primary support of her mother and two brothers, working as a teacher by day and going to school at night. She did not complete her bachelor's degree in science due to work interruptions in her studies. At night school, she studied piano, arts and crafts and painting at the Melchor Lasso de la Vega School of Arts and Crafts and obtained a diploma in typewriter machine repair. She studied English at the Panama Model School and law at the University of Panama but after three years of studying law, she graduated with a BA in philosophy and letters from the University of Panama in 1945.

While in school Páez began tutoring wealthy students. After obtaining her teaching certificate, she taught at Panama College, but when she was offered a contract for three years, she and her family moved to Garachiné where she taught at the Setegantí School, suspending her own studies. Because of her outspokenness on administrative procedures, Páez was dismissed and took a position at the Escuela Antillana, working primarily with Cuban migrants. She also taught in Macaracas, in Chilibre, and at the School Pedro J. Sosa. Discovering an opening at the archives of the Ministry of Education, Páez applied and was hired as an Officer First Class. She was then appointed deputy director of the Escuela República de Venezuela in Panama City where she taught for two years.

=== Politics ===
While she was working in Garachiné, Páez organized a women's group, Sociedad ProCultura Femenina, with the intent of educating local women on the importance of education and nutrition. She also studied the issues faced by migrant Cubans and other West Indian peoples and became an active advocate for them when she was teaching at the Escuela Antillana. In addition, she was a supporter and participant in the Feminist National Party until it waned in the 1940s.

The 1941 coup d'état against Arnulfo Arias Madrid led to a constitutional crisis in Panama and need for the organization of a new Constituent Assembly. In July, 1941 a series of laws had been passed which effectively took away Panamanian women's citizenship, while at the same time offering them limited voting rights in provincial councils, if they were literate. Wanting to ensure that women's issues were included in the discussions, Páez wrote around 30 educational, theatrical dramas, about social issues, which were broadcast over the next three years on Radio Chocú and the Voice of Panama with the backing of the Ministry of Education. The productions were not presented as propaganda, but rather as educational entertainment, though they earned Páez a large following as well as name recognition.

When in 1944, the call for a new Constituent Assembly was launched, feminists strove for inclusion. Many women were proposed as alternates, but few as actual candidates. The feminist movement of the time was organized into two primary camps: The National Union of Women, led by lawyer Clara González de Behringer, who obtained the backing of the Partido Liberal Renovador (Liberal Renewal Party) and League of Patriotic Feminists headed by Páez and Esther Neira de Calvo. González de Behringer promised that their members would vote in block for any party supporting their candidates, but the Patriotic Feminists took the approach of seeking supporters from multiple parties. After intense campaigning, in which Páez fought against racial and gender prejudices, when the votes were counted on May 6, only two women were elected to the 51 member Constituent Assembly—Neira de Calvo as a National Delegate, and Páez as the Delegate for Panamá Province. Not only were she and Neira de Calvo the first two women to serve in the National Assembly, but Páez was elected to serve as Vice President of the Assembly.

Between 1945 and 1948, Páez worked on many issues concerning women, education, and religious freedom, including, creation of a police force; recognition of women's rights; retirement for teachers, professors, nurses and telegraph operators; acceptance of minorities in Panamanian schools; among many others.

After her service in the Assembly, Páez continued her involvement in feminist causes. In 1947, she presided over the Primer Congreso Interamericano de Mujeres, held in Guatemala City, Guatemala. In 1951 she participated as the guest of honor in the General Conference of UNESCO, held in Mexico. In 1980 the Inter-American Commission of Women of the OAS inscribed her name in the "Golden Book". At the national level she was awarded the Order of Manuel Amador Guerrero, the Order Vasco Núñez de Balboa (Grade of Grand Officer), the Order Manuel José Hurtado, and received the keys to Panama City.

Later she retired to Veracruz, Panama, where she wrote plays and theater productions which were discovered after her death.

Páez died in Veracruz, Panama in 1991.

== Legacy ==
In 2005 an annual award, Condecoración Orden Gumercinda Páez, was named in her honor to recognize Panamanian women who exhibit civic virtues and exemplary professional, cultural, educational and humanitarian character. In 2011, the National Institute of Culture (INAC) recognized her work and installed an exhibit in her honor at the Afro-Antillean Museum of Panama acknowledging her work in fighting for the rights of West Indian American and indigenous children. In addition there are public monuments and schools which bear her name.
