= Clara González =

Panamanian feminist, lawyer, judge and activist

- Born: Clara González Carrillo; 11 September 1898; Remedios, Chiriquí Province, Panama Department, Colombia (now in Panama)
- Died: 10 February 1990 (aged 91); Panama City, Panama
- Other names: Clara González Carrillo de Behringer
- Occupation(s): lawyer, deputy, academic, feminist
- Years active: 1921-1964
- Known for: First Panamanian woman to earn a law degree
- Spouse: Charles A. Behringer

Clara González (1898–1990) was a Panamanian feminist, lawyer, judge, and activist. She became the first Panamanian woman to earn her Bachelor of Law Degree in 1922. The same year, she created the Partido Nacional Feminista (PNF, National Feminist Party) to campaign for women's rights and suffrage. González was central to the work of the Inter-American Commission on Women, collaborating with activists from Latin America and the United States to study the condition of women across the Americas and to recommend reforms. González remained a vital organizer for women's rights in Panama for decades and ran for political office after Panamanian women were granted voting rights in 1945. She later became the first Panamanian woman to serve as a juvenile court judge, where she assisted in drafting the Panamanian juvenile code.

== Early life and education ==
Clara González Carrillo was born on 11 September 1898 in Remedios, Chiriquí Province, Republic of Panama to a Spanish immigrant, David González, and Basilia Carrillo Sánchez, a woman of indigenous descent. During her early childhood, she lived with her family in Costa Rica, where they were exiled between 1900 and 1904. When she was six years old, González was raped by a family friend. This experience would later influence her passion for the law and for women's advocacy. She earned a teaching degree from the Escuela Normal de Institutoras before enrolling in the Escuela Nacional de Derecho (National School of Law). While she was in law school, she taught at the Escuela Manuel José Hurtado.

In 1922, she became the first Panamanian woman to earn a Bachelor of Law after submitting her graduate thesis, La Mujer ante el Derecho Panameño (Woman in Panamanian Law), which displayed some of her early thinking on feminism. González was prohibited from practicing law until President Belisario Porras's administration amended the law in 1925, allowing González to begin her legal career.

== Career ==
=== Entry into Activism ===
The need to organize a feminist movement that favored women's participation in politics led González and women leaders like Sara Sotillo, Elida Campodónico de Crespo, and Rosa Navas to create the Partido Nacional Feminista (National Women's Party) in 1923, though it took until 1924 to gain legal status as an organization. One of the first things that the group did was organize the Escuela de Cultura Femenina (School of Feminine Culture) to provide education for Panamanian women.

In the early 1920s, González started to gravitate towards radical groups that supported socialism and anti-imperialism. She began to advocate for social and economic justice in addition to civil rights and suffrage for women. González took strong positions on issues of Panamanian sovereignty including opposition to the Panama Canal Treaty, and she connected Latin American women's issues to the necessity for national self-determination.

After winning a scholarship in 1927, González moved to the United States to attend New York University where she earned a doctorate in law in 1929.

=== Pan-Americanism and Popular Front Activities ===
In 1928, the Inter-American Commission of Women (IACW) was established as an intergovernmental body to study the conditions of women throughout the Americas. This represented a central event in the formation of a pan-American movement for women's rights. González was appointed to the commission as a representative for Panama. She was also contacted by Doris Stevens, the chair of the commission, who assigned González to work on legal issues and women's rights in the Pan-American Union office in Washington, D.C. From 1928 to 1930. González acted as the head of research for the IACW, overseeing the creation of reports on the status of women's rights on a nation-by-nation basis in order to inform future international conferences and provide women's rights conventions with up-to-date information.

Eventually, González grew resentful of Stevens's unilateral style of leadership and her dismissive approach towards Latin American women's issues. Stevens denied González and other Latin American activists IACW funding in order to attend the very conferences that González's research was prepared for. Stevens also avoided issues raised by activists over U.S. imperialism and denied leadership posts within the IACW to Latin American activists. As a result, González began to strengthen her relationship with more radical Latin American feminists, such as Cuban activist Ofelia Domínguez Navarro.

González returned to Panama in 1930 and began working as a professor at the National Institute teaching economics, political science and sociology. She taught at the Institute until 1937, and later at the newly-founded University of Panama, where she taught criminology, family law, and juvenile justice.

González took an inclusionary stance towards women’s rights by collaborating with groups that emphasized the importance of analyzing the needs of intersecting identities, such as class and ethnicity, when fighting for equality. During the 1930s, the anti-fascist alliance between liberals and radicals through Popular Front politics provided González and other Latin American feminists with the opportunity to advocate for women's social and economic rights. González pursued these goals through a renewal of her work with the Partido Nacional Feminista (National Women's Party), working against right-wing groups like the Panamanian Acción Comunal, which aligned themselves with European fascism. These activities and her support for socialism led Panamanian government officials to accuse González of being a communist and deny her a government posting. While she was not a member of the Communist Party, she did work with communist activists when she traveled to Mexico in 1938. While in Mexico, she became involved with the Frente Único Pro-Derechos de la Mujer (FUPDM) (the Sole Front for Women’s Rights), an organization that championed a comprehensive vision of human rights for women.

=== Later Political and Judiciary Career ===
In the early 1940s, González continued her work as a women's rights organizer in Panama. In 1943, she married Charles A. Behringer, an American civil engineer working in the Panama Canal Zone.

In 1945, Panamanian women won the right to vote, leading to González's entry into electoral politics. In December 1944, she founded the Unión Nacional de Mujeres (National Women's Party). She ran as a candidate for the Constitutional Assembly of 1945 with the support of the Liberal Renewal Party, and later ran for the vice-presidency of Panama, but failed to win office in both campaigns. González continued her activities as a feminist organizer, working on issues of child welfare with UNESCO, as well as serving as an official in the International Federation of Women Lawyers (Federación Internacional de Abogadas).

In 1951, she became the first Panamanian woman named as a juvenile court judge, a position that gave her the opportunity to assist in establishing standards for the treatment of juvenile delinquents. She continued working for the juvenile court until 1964, when she retired at her husband's request and settled with him in West Covina, California. During this time, González was questioned by U.S. federal officials over her links to communists, but she defended herself by asserting her support for liberalism. After her husband's death in 1966, she returned to Panama.

Clara González died after complications from a hip surgery in Panama City on 11 February 1990.

== Legacy ==
The School of Public Prosecutors in Panama bears her name, as does an annual award given by the National Union of Lawyers to the legal professional who has excelled in the fight for women's or human rights.

== See also ==
- First women lawyers around the world
- Confederación Sindical Obrera y Agraria
