= Esther Neira de Calvo =

Panama's politic

- Born: Esther Neira Laffargue; May 1, 1890; Penonomé, Panama Department, Colombia
- Died: March 24, 1978 (aged 87); Washington, D.C., US
- Education: Pedagogic Institute Wavre Notre Dame, Belgium; Mount St. Vincent College, USA; Columbia University, USA
- Occupations: Educator, feminist, politician, diplomat
- Years active: 1913–1968
- Spouse: Raúl J. Calvo (married 1916–58)
- Children: Gloriela Calvo Neira
- Parent(s): Rafael Neira Ayala; Julia Laffargue de Neira

Esther Neira de Calvo (1890–1978) was a prominent educator, feminist and women's right advocate. She was the first woman elected as a National Deputy to the Third Constituent Assembly in Panama. She was the founder and president of the National Society for the Advancement of Women and of the Women's Patriotic League, and actively worked for Panamanian women's enfranchisement, finally attained in 1945–46. She served as Executive Secretary of the Inter American Commission of Women from 1949 to 1965 and was Panama's Ambassador to the Council of the Organization of American States from 1966 to 1968.

== Biography ==
Esther Neira de Calvo was born on May 1, 1890, in Penonomé, Coclé, when the Isthmus of Panama was a Colombian Department. Her parents were Rafael Neira Ayala, member of the National Constituent Assembly of the Republic of Panama in 1904, and Julia Laffargue de Neira. She began her studies in Penonomé and Taboga, continuing in Panama City at the Normal school for Women.

In 1904, soon after Panama separated from Colombia, the first Government of the Republic of Panama offered her a scholarship to study education in Belgium. She spent the next eight years studying at the Pedagogic Institute Wavre Notre Dame, Belgium, affiliated with the universities of Leuven and Brussels. During this time she earned degrees as primary school teacher and professor of pedagogy, specialized in secondary education and administration; professor of French and English languages, and professor of physical education. She also earned certificates as a nurse for community hygiene, a first aid attendant from the Belgian Red Cross and as voice professor, endorsed by the Antwerp Conservatory of Music. She traveled throughout countries of Europe, studying their cultures and languages. In 1912, she moved to the United States where she studied American education programs.

== Educational work ==
Esther Neira returned to Panama in 1913 and began her professional career as a professor of pedagogy at the Normal School for Women. Later, she became a professor of Hygiene and Childcare at the Professional School.

At age 26 she married business man and public servant Raúl J. Calvo in 1916. Married for 42 years, Neira de Calvo was widowed in May 1958. The couple had one daughter, Gloriela Calvo Neira.

She continued her career in the field of education. In 1923, she accepted the position of Inspector General of secondary, normal and professional education in the Secretariat of Public Instruction until 1927. That same year, she returned to the Normal School for Women, Panama's only teacher's training school for women. In addition to directing the institution, she taught comparative education, pedagogy, psychology and French. After eleven years as the Directress, she left the Normal School in 1938 and organized the Women's Lyceum, a university preparatory school for women which she directed until 1945, when she was elected a National Deputy to the Third Constituent Assembly of the Republic of Panama.

== Feminism ==
Esther Neira de Calvo had been involved in Panama's feminist movement since the second decade of the 20th century, fighting for the recognition of women's civil, political, economic and cultural rights. Esther Neira de Calvo and Clara González were undisputed leaders of that struggle.

As a delegate of Panama she attended in 1922 the first Pan American Women's Conference, organized by the League of Women Voters of the United States, held in Baltimore. There she shared experiences with Carrie Chapman Catt and other women who participated in the struggle for the 19th constitutional amendment of 1920 that granted political rights to the women of that country. Neira de Calvo also worked with feminist leaders from Latin America, such as Brazilian Bertha Lutz and Chilean Amanda Labarca.

That Conference was the incentive she needed to dedicate her life to the struggle for women's rights. The following year, 1923, Neira de Calvo founded the National Society for the Advancement of Women, together with prominent women of the time, such as Nicole Garay, Esperanza Guardia de Miró, Otilia Jiménez and Beatriz Miranda.

In 1926, she organized and chaired the Inter American Women's Congress, the first international feminist congress in Panama, in parallel to the Bolivarian Amphithetical Congress of 1826.

In 1938, when only five countries in the Americas recognized the right of women to vote and to be elected to political life, she was appointed by the Panamanian government as a delegate to the Inter American Commission of Women (IACW), an organization created in Havana in 1928, to work for the extension of civil, political, economic and cultural rights of women.

When the Organization of American States (OAS) was created in 1948 by the Ninth Pan American Conference in Bogotá, Colombia, the IACW became part of that organization. The following year, 1949, the OAS Secretary General appointed Neira de Calvo Executive Secretary of the IACW in Washington, DC, a position she held until her retirement in 1965.

== Political life ==
The Government of Panama called for elections to the Third Constituent Assembly in February 1945 after the Cabinet Council granted women the right to vote and to be elected. Shortly thereafter, Esther Neira de Calvo with other feminists founded the Women's Patriotic League which had, among its objectives, the education of Panamanian women in the exercise of their civil and political rights through press articles, conferences and radio talks.

With the support of five political parties, she was proclaimed a candidate for National Deputy. An intense campaign followed throughout the country and when the votes were counted the next May 6, only two women were elected for the first time, who completed a total of fifty one deputies: Esther Neira de Calvo as a National Deputy and Gumercinda Páez for the Province of Panama.

As a National Deputy, Neira de Calvo was selected as a member of the commission of nine deputies to study the Proposed Constitution for discussion by the full Assembly. She actively participated in drafting the Labor and Sanitary Codes and was a proponent of laws creating the School of Social Services at the University of Panama, the Police School, and the National Council of Minors.

== Social and cultural activities ==
Esther Neira de Calvo began her social and cultural activities together with her educational work. From the time the Red Cross of Panama was founded in 1917, she collaborated with her founder and first president, Lady Matilde de Obarrio de Mallet, directing one of the groups of voluntary visitors to the most needy neighborhoods. In 1922, she was appointed vice president of the institution under the presidency of Doña Evelina Alfaro de Orillac.

In 1923, she initiated reforms to the prison system for women and minors. That same year she chaired the Panama Public Entertainment Board.

Esther Neira de Calvo was a founding member of the National Opera School in 1925, a private institution subsidized by the Panama Government. Under the direction of Italian professor and tenor Alfredo Graziani, she also enrolled as a student. The School prospered and it soon made its presence felt in the cultural life of the young Republic of Panama. With Professor Graziani and some of its advanced students, the School began to show its accomplishments by presenting operas at the National Theatre a year later. Neira de Calvo participated as a leading soprano in two of the earlier performances.

As Directress of the Normal School for Women, 1927–38, she established the Youth Red Cross. In addition, she promoted and organized school health programs, sports for women in secondary schools and school canteens in primary schools.

During World War II, she assisted servicemen and coordinated cultural activities for U.S. troops stationed in Panama, as part of the war effort.

Esther Neira de Calvo played a predominant role in the country's social work history. As a National Deputy she proposed the law for the creation of the School of Social Service at the University of Panama, the first university school of this specialty in Latin America. This law opened the way for the formal development of social welfare programs at the private and governmental level.

== Last years ==
After her retirement from the IACW in 1965, she represented Panama as Ambassador, alternate representative to the Council of the OAS. The following year, she participated in the Fourth Meeting of the Inter American Cultural Council of the OAS. In 1967, she attended the Twelfth Meeting of Consultation of Ministers of Foreign Affairs held in Washington.

Esther Neira de Calvo died in Washington, D.C. ten years later, on March 24, 1978, at age 87. At her own request, her body was flown to Panama for burial in the Garden of Peace. Her remains were later exhumed and her ashes placed in a crypt at the National Shrine of the Heart of Mary, along those of her husband and mother.

== Awards and recognition ==
During the more than five decades of continuous professional work, Esther Neira de Calvo received honors and acknowledgements. Foremost among them:

- "Les Palmes Académiques, Officier d'Academie" conferred in 1935 by the French Ministry of Education for "her services to French culture in Panama".
- "Orden al Mérito" conferred in 1945 by the Republic of Chile as organizer and delegate of Panama to the First Conference of Ministers of Education of the Americas" held in Panama the prior year.
- "Orden Vasco Núñez de Balboa, Gran Oficial" conferred in 1946 by the Republic of Panama, imposed by the President Enrique A. Jiménez, as a National Deputy to the Third Constituent Assembly.
- "Orden Al Mérito Duarte, Sánchez y Mella" conferred in 1956 by the Dominican Republic as IACW Executive Secretary during the Twelfth IACW Assembly held in Ciudad Trujillo (Santo Domingo), Dominican Republic that year.

Three USA academic institutions distinguished her with honorary degrees:

- University of Southern California, Los Angeles, in 1937: Doctor of Pedagogy.
- Russell Sage College, Troy, New York, in 1941: Doctor of Education, presented by the U.S. First Lady Eleanor Roosevelt during a Pan American Festival at the college campus.
- Western College for Women, Oxford, Ohio, in 1967: Doctor of Law.

In 1963, Esther Neira de Calvo was offered a National Tribute in her native country Panama, as organizer and first Directress of the Women's Lyceum, on the occasion of the Silver Anniversary celebrations of the Lyceum Foundation. There she received awards and recognitions from official, academic, cultural and social institutions of Panama. Foremost:

- "Manuel José Hurtado" Medal, conferred by the Ministry of Education "in recognition of her services in the field of education" imposed by the President of Panama, Roberto F. Chiari.
- "Octavio Méndez Pereira" Medallion presented by the Rector of the University of Panama, Narciso Garay P.
- The Municipal Council of Panama declared her "Distinguished Guest of the Capital City for being one of the most conspicuous figures of national education and one of the most outstanding exponents of Panamanian women".
