= Postal Transportation Service =

Former rail based division of US Post Office Department

The Postal Transportation Service (PTS) was the renamed successor to the Railway Mail Service of the United States Post Office Department from October 1, 1949. Although this branch of the service had been in charge of all transit mail, some parts had little to do with railroads, even though they were still the most important part of the service. In 1950, of the 32,000 clerks assigned to the PTS, only about 16,000 actually worked on trains. The remainder were in terminals, transfer offices, Air Mail Facility, Highway Post Offices (HPO), administrative offices, etc. Boat Railway Post Office (Boat RPO), Streetcar Railway Post Offices, and the Seapost Service had already been discontinued. The name of the Chief Clerk's office was changed to District Superintendent's office.

During the preceding decades, only one or two clerks per year had lost their lives in wrecks and several years saw no fatalities. When Pennsylvania Railroad's crack "Red Arrow," New York City, New York & Pittsburgh, Pennsylvania Railway Post Office (RPO) Train 68, derailed in 1947 at Bennington Curve (West of Altoona, Pennsylvania), killing six clerks and badly injuring others, the whole country was shocked.

Even with all the trains that had been discontinued, the several round trips of RPO service on trunk lines, along with the expanded service and the star route highway services connecting the RPOs, maintained very good mail service through the 1950s. In the 1950s the Post Office Department turned the supervision of what had been the PTS Terminals over to the postmasters where the terminals were located.

== Discontinuance of the mobile units ==
The HPO and RPO routes were collectively referred to as mobile units. The next move by the Post Office Department, in 1960, was to put each PTS District Superintendent's office under a postmaster, calling it the Mobile Unit Section, c/o Postmaster. This put all RPO clerks under postmasters. When there was no longer a surplus of RPO clerks from discontinued lines to fill vacancies on lines still operating, both subs and regulars from the post office roster were used. This eliminated the need for PTS civil service examinations.

In 1963, the Sectional Center concept of transit mail service was announced, along with the introduction of a ZIP Code on mail to facilitate mechanized processing. The ZIP Code made it possible to distribute all mail by numbers with machines holding the routing associated for each address. This was a far cry from the knowledge that was necessary before when mobile unit distribution clerks were expected to know the routing for several thousand post offices in their assignment. There was no place in the new set-up for an RPO service.

This development gave the railroads, knowing they were going to lose the mail revenue, an excuse to get out of the unprofitable passenger train business, something that they had wanted to do for years. After that, when a train was discontinued, instead of moving the RPO car on to another set of trains still operating, the RPO service was also discontinued. Within about four years there was only one round trip of RPO service left on practically all the trunk lines, and their value was minimal.

It came as no surprise to the railroads or to the remaining RPO clerks when, on April 21, 1968, Assistant Postmaster General Hartigan issued a news release concerning RPO service. It stated that RPO cars on 162 passenger trains in the nation would be phased out of service by the end of the year, affecting 2,224 postal workers. The RPO clerks who were furloughed had a choice: they were placed in post offices at or near their homes, or they retired. If a clerk found no assignment in his grade at the post office assigned, he could keep his higher grade for two years, after which he had to take a reduction.

With one exception, the phasing out was a success. The New York, New York & Washington, DC RPO, which covered the highest populated corridor in the nation, continued to operate until July 1, 1977. On a part of this same line, between Philadelphia and Washington, the first recorded "route agent" had been assigned to accompany the mail, 140 years earlier. The USPS continued to use regular scheduled Amtrak passenger trains to haul the mail on this line.

On October 30, 1984, a "mail-only" train service was inaugurated between Washington, D.C., and Springfield/Boston, MA with a timetable tailored specifically to meet the postal service requirements. The northbound train was named "The Fast Mail" (train #12, later #190) departing Washington daily at 3 AM and the southbound "The Mail Express" (#13). Eventually, all mail transportation on Amtrak was discontinued by 2005 under the administration of David L. Gunn.
