= Bureau of Transportation =

The Bureau of Transportation of the United States Post Office Department was established in 1960. It was the successor to the Postal Transportation Service (PTS); the PTS had responsibility for mail transportation contracting as well as employees assigned to Mobile Unit and stationary PTS facilities such as Air Mail Facility, Terminal Railway Post Office, or Transfer Office operations. Only the contract issuance and administration responsibilities for mail routes were given to the Bureau of Transportation. Human Resources were transferred to postmasters in the cities where Mobile and Stationary Units were located. This division of activity continued to the end of the Post Office Department and after it became the U.S. Postal Service.
