= Transfer office =

U.S. Mail distribution component from the 1880's to 1950's

From the 1880s until well into the 1950s, virtually all long-distance transportation of United States Mail was performed by the railroads. Specially equipped railway post office (RPO) cars were a part of most passenger trains, the cars staffed by highly trained railway postal clerks who sorted mail as the train sped along its route. The growth of this mail distribution network paralleled the expansion of the railroads, allowing mail to be exchanged between routes at junction points where two railroads crossed or shared passenger terminals.

Shortly before the First World War, the Post Office Department began assigning railway mail clerks to new transfer office positions which were established at many of the larger railroad junction points as well as passenger terminals in larger cities. These transfer clerks supervised mail exchanges between trains, served as the local liaison between the Railway Mail Service and the host railroad, and maintained detailed statistical records which were used to audit railroad charges for mail transportation and car usage. This latter task involved determining the amount of mail in baggage cars or storage mail cars, a unique process of estimating the car area occupied by mail sacks rather than counting individual sacks. Other duties included sorting letters which had been mailed at depot letter boxes and providing a hand-to-hand receipt for registered mail transferred between connecting railway post office routes. Many of the transfer offices had a unique postmark to cancel the mail which was sorted by the office, and these cancellations are still collected by philatelists and postal historians.

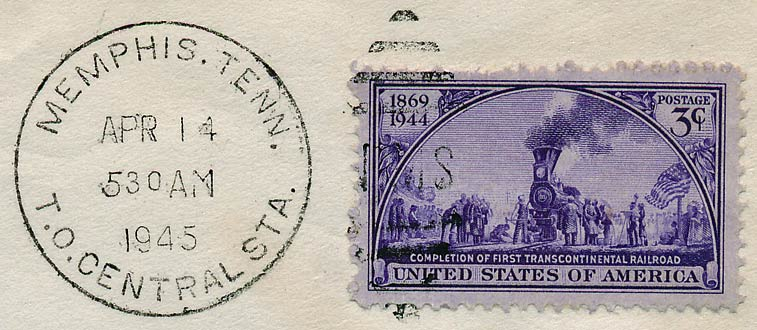
T.O. transfer office postal cancellation applied to mail sorted by the Memphis Central Station transfer office. Like many large cities, Memphis had two passenger terminals, and a similar transfer office was maintained at Memphis Union Station.

Transfer offices were used by RPO clerks as a point to read job bulletins (order books maintained by the Chief Clerk) before starting on a run, and as a location to finish paperwork at the end of a run. In 1951, almost 200 transfer offices were maintained across the country. Larger cities with multiple railroad stations often had several different transfer offices, one at each station. As mail transportation by rail declined in the 1950s, smaller transfer offices were closed. With the continued erosion of rail mail operations, and particularly after the demise of the railway post office network in the late 1960s, the need for transfer offices diminished and most were closed or merged with other positions by the early 1970s.

== See also ==
- Owney (dog)
- Railway post office
- Terminal railway post office

== Sources ==
- Long, Bryant A. (1951) Mail by Rail, the Story of the Postal Transportation Service, Simmons-Boardman, New York City.
- Wilking, Clarence. (1985) The Railway Mail Service, Railway Mail Service Library, Boyce, Virginia. Available as an MS Word file at http://www.railwaymailservicelibrary.org/articles/THE_RMS.DOC
