= Mobile post office =

Type of postal service infrastructure

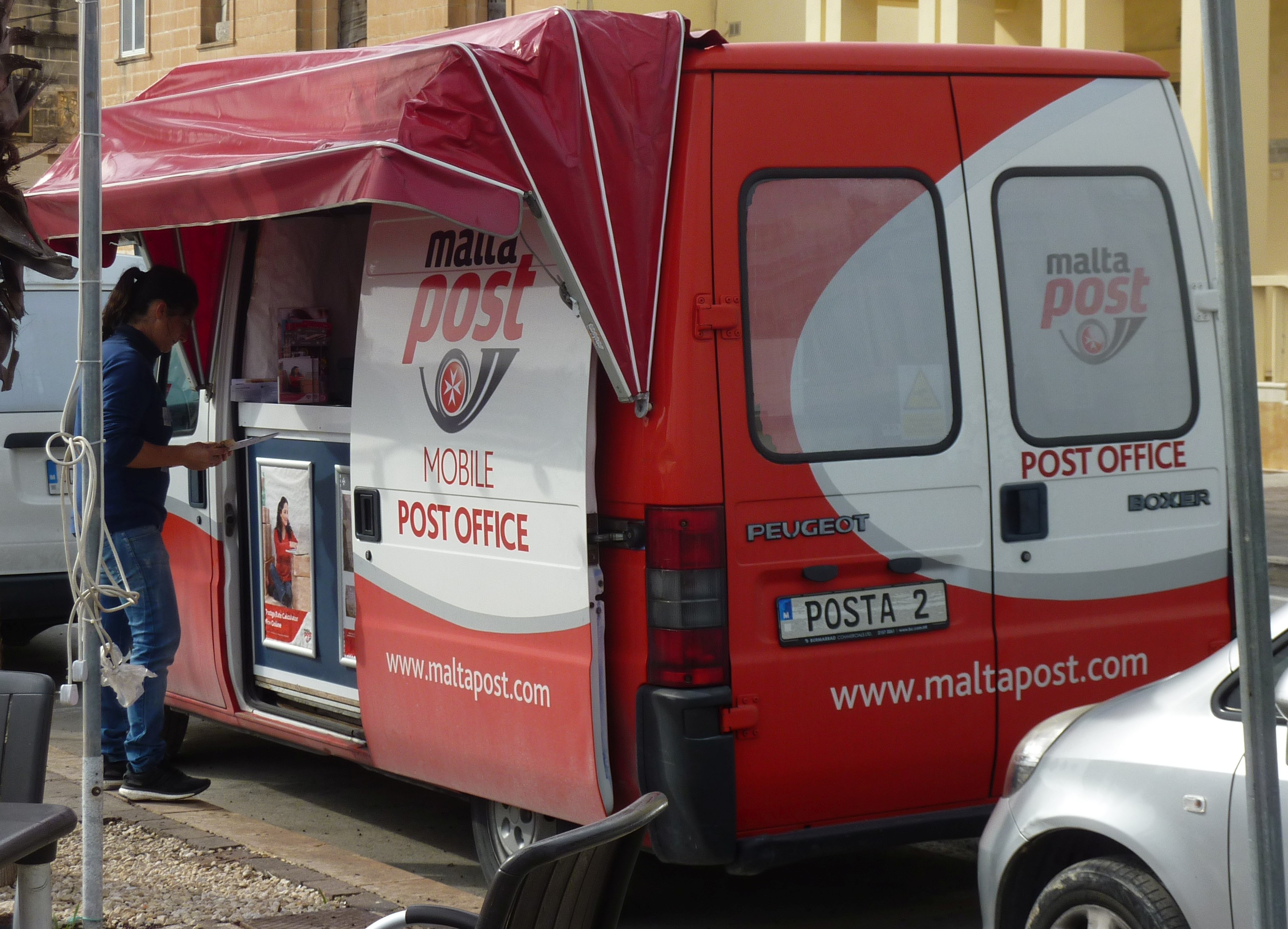
A MaltaPost mobile post office

Mobile post offices deliver mail and other postal services through specially equipped vehicles, such as trucks and trains.

== Mobile post offices around the world ==
=== Canada ===
Canada began its railroad mail services in 1859. Both CN Rail and CP Rail used mailcars to haul mail across Canada. With the switch to mail delivery by air or truck, Canada Post no longer delivers mail by rail.

Via Rail provides courier/mail service, VIAPAQ Courier, at select train stations in Ontario, Quebec, New Brunswick and Nova Scotia.

=== France ===
The French postal service, La Poste, carries mail on exclusively mail trains, operating at night, called SNCF TGV La Poste.

=== Hong Kong ===
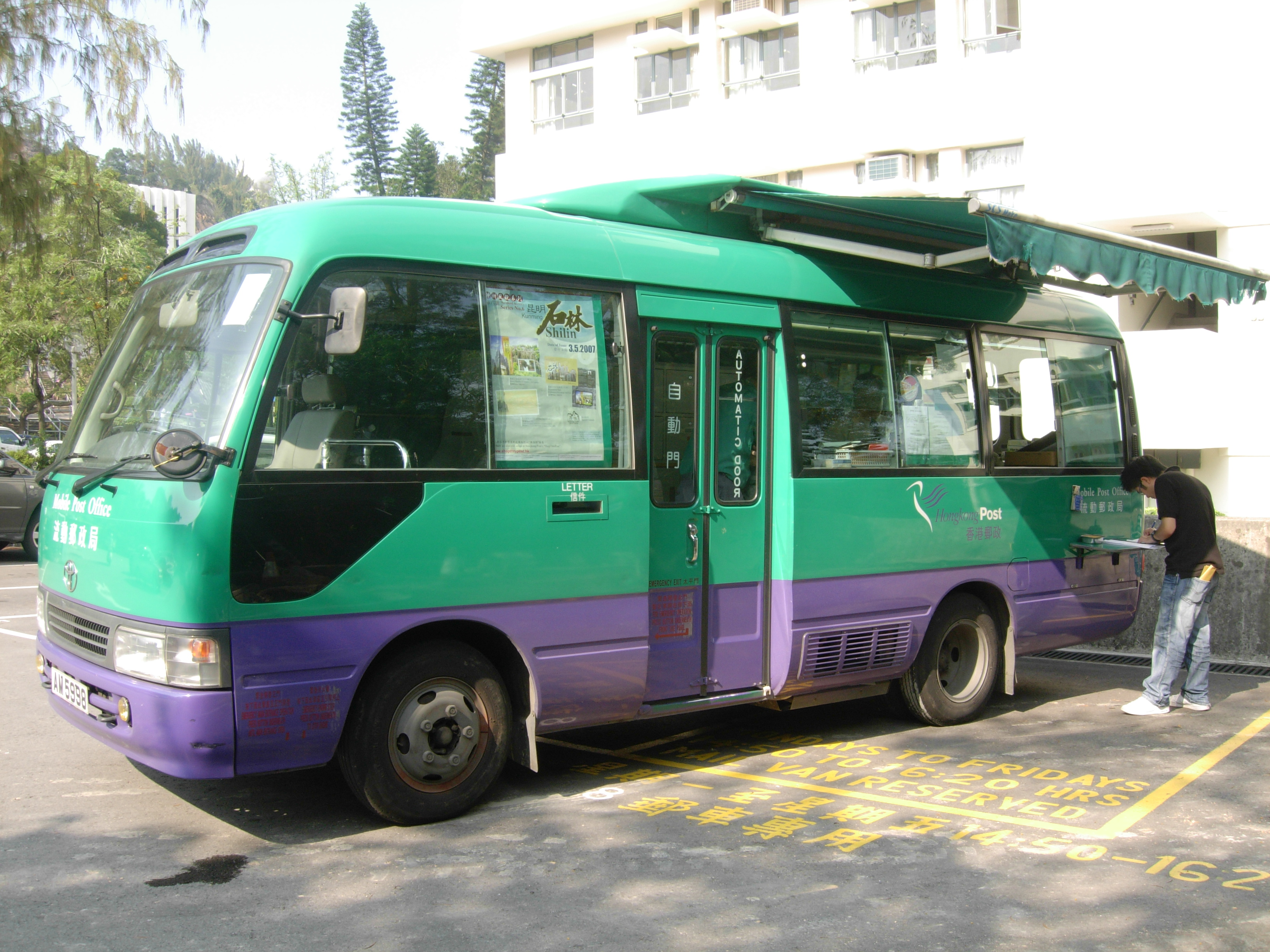
A mobile postal truck serving The Chinese University of Hong Kong

Mobile postal trucks serve three routes for Hongkong Post operating within Hong Kong.

=== Israel ===
In Israel, mobile post offices began in 1955 as part of the country's postal services for the Negev and Galilee.

=== Pakistan ===
Following an earthquake in 2005, the Universal Postal Union (UPU) donated monies to Pakistan for a mobile postal office truck.

=== Singapore ===
The Mobile Post Office was introduced in November 1952 and was operated by Postal Services Department. It provided on-the-spot postal services to residents living in rural areas where there were no post offices. The vans followed fixed routes and time schedules which were announced in the newspapers and each visit only lasted about one to two hours. As more postal facilities were set up across the island, the mobile post offices were no longer needed to serve customers in rural areas and were eventually withdrawn from service in 1980.

=== United Kingdom ===
The United Kingdom pioneered the modern use of what it calls a travelling post office (TPO), a railway service that operated for the first time in 1838. TPOs were removed from service by Royal Mail in early 2004.

In the UK, road vehicles that provide postal services are known as mobile post offices, to differentiate them from the (now obsolete) rail travelling post offices (TPOs). Mobile post offices were first introduced in 1936 to provide telegraph, telephone and postal services at special events such as race meetings and shows. The need for large mobile post offices declined over the years, but since the mid-1990s small van versions have appeared in rural towns without a permanent post office.

=== United States ===
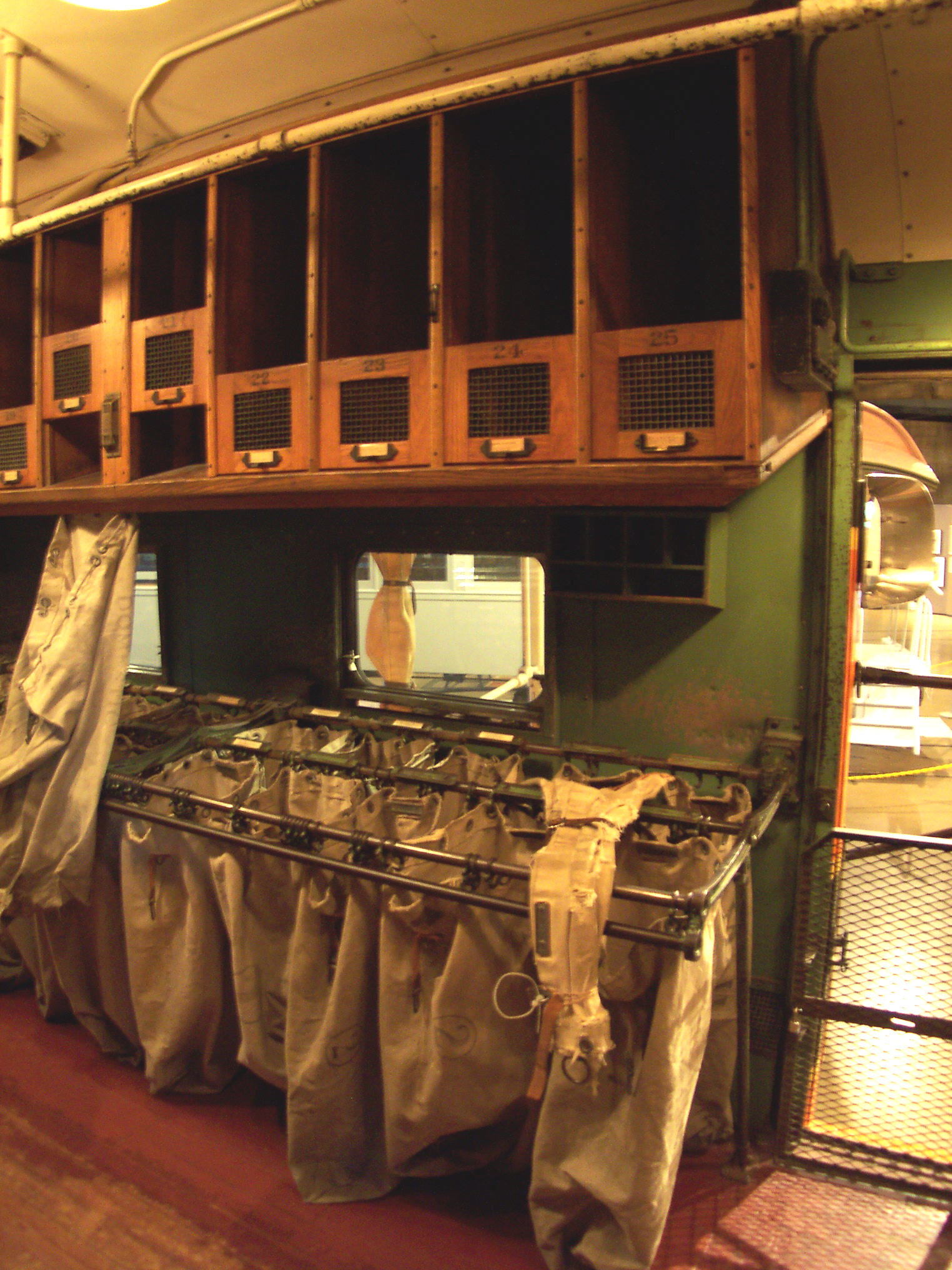
Interior of an RPO from the Great Northern Railway

In the United States, the most prominent mobile post offices are railway post offices. For about 30 years, ending in the 1920s, a few cities had streetcar offices. In addition, the U.S. runs a Boat Railway Post Offices. The boat services were first available for inland waterways, beginning in 1857, and subsequently ocean routes to Puerto Rico, Canal Zone, and from Seattle to Alaska. The rail and boat offices were discontinued in 1977 and 1978, respectively.

=== Other countries ===
According to the Universal Postal Union (UPU) database, other countries with mobile post offices include: Armenia, Austria, Azerbaijan, Belarus, Bulgaria, Czech Republic, Egypt, Greece, Hungary, Indonesia, Kazakhstan, Lithuania, Luxembourg, Madagascar, Moldova, New Caledonia, New Zealand, North Macedonia, Norway, Peru, Romania, Russia, Saudi Arabia, Serbia, Slovakia, Spain, Sweden, Switzerland, Tunisia, Turkey, Turkmenistan, Ukraine, Uzbekistan, Vietnam, Yemen, and Zimbabwe. Taiwan's Chunghwa Post, which is no longer a member of the UPU, also maintains one mobile post office in Yuli, Hualien.

== Postage stamps ==
Countries have issued postage stamps to recognize mobile postal services. For instance, in 1913, the U.S. issued parcel post stamps that portray a mail train as well as an employee of a railway post office. In 1974, Zambia issued a series of four stamps as commemoratives for the centenary of the Universal Postal Union. Israel issued a stamp in 1959 picturing its red mobile post truck, pictured.

In 1950, the Mobile Post Office Society was established as a philatelic organization interested in the postmarks and activities of mobile offices, primarily in the U.S.

== Popular culture ==
In popular culture, the mobile post office may be best known for the Great Train Robbery (1963).
