= Mochila =

Mochila may refer to:

- Backpack, in Spanish
- Arhuaca mochila, a traditional shoulder bag made by the Arhuaco indigenous peoples of Colombia
- Pony Express mochila, a saddlebag used by Pony Express riders in the 19th century
