= George Bangs =

Developer of the railroad mail car

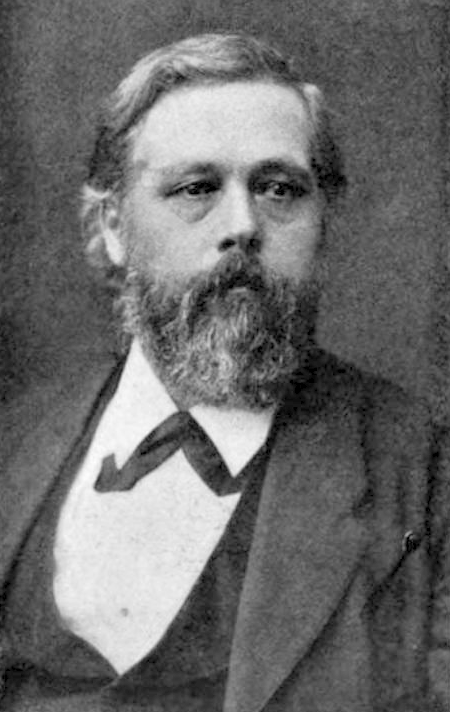
- Born: February 26, 1826; Milan, Ohio, US
- Died: November 17, 1877 (aged 51); Washington, DC, US
- Burial place: Rosehill Cemetery, Chicago, Illinois; 41°59′19.3″N 87°40′34.4″W
- Occupations: Newspaper publisher, civil servant
- Employer: US Postal Service
- Known for: "Fast-mail" trains
- Title: General Superintendent of the Railway Mail Service

Signature
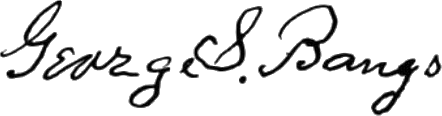

George S. Bangs (February 26, 1826 (Note: His birth year is given as 1823 in one obituary. Another states his birth date as February 22, 1825 and a lengthy biography gives February 20, 1823. His monument is inscribed with "Aged 51 years, 8 months, 22 days" from which February 26, 1826, is calculated.) – November 17, 1877) was an American businessman who began his adult life working in private ventures including printing, shoes, farming and journalism before becoming postmaster of Aurora, Illinois, in 1861. During his postal career, he worked with the Railway Mail Service (RMS). There he improved the mail sorting system on trains and was the most prominent advocate of "fast-mail" express mail trains. In 1871, as the RMS General Superintendent, he oversaw the start of the "fast-mail" service which began in 1875. The next year he resigned after Congress cut funding. He died in 1877 and was remembered with an elaborate grave marker denoting his contribution to the postal service.

== Early life ==
Bangs was born in Milan, Ohio (Note: One biography says he was born in Akron, Ohio) to Samuel and Electa (née Adams) Bangs. His heritage is traced back seven generations to Edward Bangs, a Plymouth Colony settler who arrived in 1623 on the Anne, the second ship to arrive in Colonial America after the Mayflower. Bangs grew up in Akron, Ohio, and attended the local schools. At age nine, Bangs apprenticed as a printer working at the Akron Beacon. His skills were such that by age 15, he obtained employment as a journeyman printer at the Cleveland Herald. He may also have worked in Ravenna. He was next reported to be in Wisconsin, working for the Milwaukee Sentinel, the Janesville Gazette and the Rock County Democrat.

One biography says he ventured into the boot and shoe business while in Wisconsin and was swindled by a business partner which caused him to move on to Illinois.

== Illinois ==
Bangs relocated to Kane County, Illinois, where he befriended Lewis Steward, a businessman and politician. He moved again in 1851 to Aurora, first working on the Aurora Beacon for over a year before farming strawberries for a short time. In 1858, with Steward's help, he purchased the Aurora Republican and merged it with the Beacon, becoming editor and publisher of the combined operation and making it an important Ohio paper. After the 1858 Lincoln–Douglas debates, he used the paper to suggest Abraham Lincoln as the Republican presidential candidate and worked to obtain his election in 1860. He maintained his involvement with the paper throughout the Civil War era until March 1866.

Upon the outbreak of war, Bangs helped organize the volunteer 36th Illinois Infantry Regiment unit and was appointed a Colonel on the staff of Governor Richard Yates.

== Postal career ==
As a political spoil, Bangs was appointed postmaster of Aurora in 1861 as one of Lincoln's first appointments, and served – with a reappointment in 1865 – until 1869. He befriended George B. Armstrong, who became the General Superintendent of the Railway Mail Service (RMS) in 1869, at which time Bangs was made the assistant superintendent in Chicago. Upon the retirement of Armstrong in 1871, President Ulysses S. Grant appointed Bangs General Superintendent in Washington, D.C.

== Rail mail ==
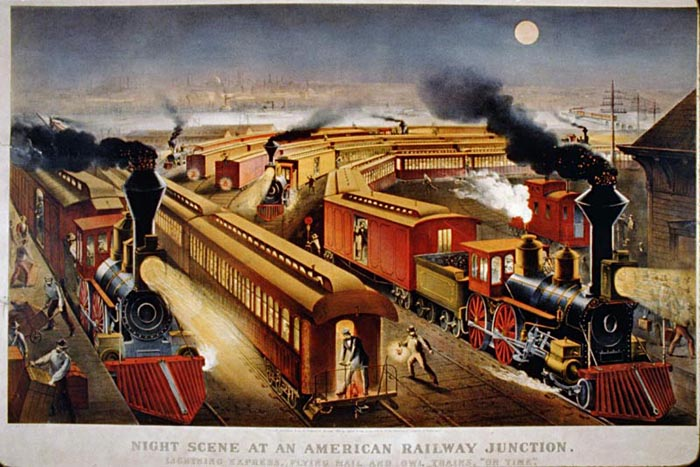
A nighttime scene on a Currier & Ives postcard, c. 1876, of a US railroad junction, "Fast-mail" train in center

The United States Post Office Department utilized trains from the 1830s. Mail was shipped to be delivered to towns along rail lines or forwarded on to other destinations. In the 1860s, mail for the Western United States was shipped by rail as far as St. Joseph, Missouri, and forwarded by stagecoach from there. The process was improved in 1862 when the first mail car was used to sort the mail on the train before it reached St. Joseph. In 1864 Armstrong, then the assistant postmaster in Chicago, suggested widespread expansion of mail-sorting cars, leading to the development of the Railway Post Office car, first tested between Chicago and Clinton, Iowa, with the Chicago & Northwestern in August 1864. Bangs's first improvement to the RMS in 1869 was the addition of "serviceable lamps" used in mail cars that he had imported from Germany.

In an 1874 report, Bangs advocated the creation of a mail train running between New York and Chicago, "designed to expedite the movement of mail from the east to the west and cover the distance in about twenty-four hours". His lobbying was successful and the RMS was expanded in 1875 with "fast-mail" trains, high-speed mail-only trains that had priority over all other rail traffic. Each train consisted of four mail cars and one coach. The first such routes were New York City to Chicago on the New York Central, and Philadelphia to Chicago on the Pennsylvania Railroad. The inaugural "fast-mail" train left New York at 4 a.m. on September 16, 1875, and arrived over 900 mi (1,400 km) away at Chicago's Lake Shore station in a record-setting 26 hours. Guests on the train numbered more than 100, including various postal officials, Senator Carl Schurz, and Vice-President Henry Wilson. The New York Central and Pennsylvania Railroad fast-mail trains to Chicago were named the 20th Century Limited and Limited Mail, respectively.

Bangs also directed the RMS to first sort mail only to the state level and forward it to the most distant railway post office in each state that could process it further. This distributed the sorting process and reduced backups. Under his tenure, the miles of railroad used to haul mail increased to 70,083. A large volume of mail continued to be carried by Railway Post Office cars on regular passenger trains. Even though the priority trains were very successful in improving mail operations, Congress discontinued funding eleven months after the initial run. In response, Bangs resigned from his position in 1876.

== Later life ==
Shortly after Bangs' resignation, President Grant dismissed Marshall Jewell from the cabinet-level Postmaster General position and offered it to Bangs. Bangs chose not to accept, since Grant's term was ending shortly. He had a reputation for efficiency and civil-service reform, and was considered a likely choice for the position again when it was filled by President Rutherford Hayes, but Hayes wanted a less practical and more political person. In 1876, Bang returned to journalism and founded Railway Age in Chicago.

Bangs was appointed assistant Treasurer of the United States in Chicago and served in that role from March 1876 to August 1877. He became an agent of the Merchant's Union Express in Washington, where he died on November 17, 1877. Bangs had been suffering from Bright's disease, a malady of the kidneys. A funeral service was held at the house where he died and attendees included the two U.S. senators from Ohio, David Davis and Richard Oglesby, Postmaster General David M. Key, as well as other congressmen and postal officials. A special rail car, provided by the Pennsylvania Railroad, was used to transport his body and entourage, led by his successor superintendent of the RMS Theodore Vail, to Chicago where he was buried on November 21. The Chicago post office was closed for the funeral at Christ Reformed Episcopal Church, in which 600 postal clerks marched in procession. Chicago mail trains were adorned in memorial.

== Grave ==
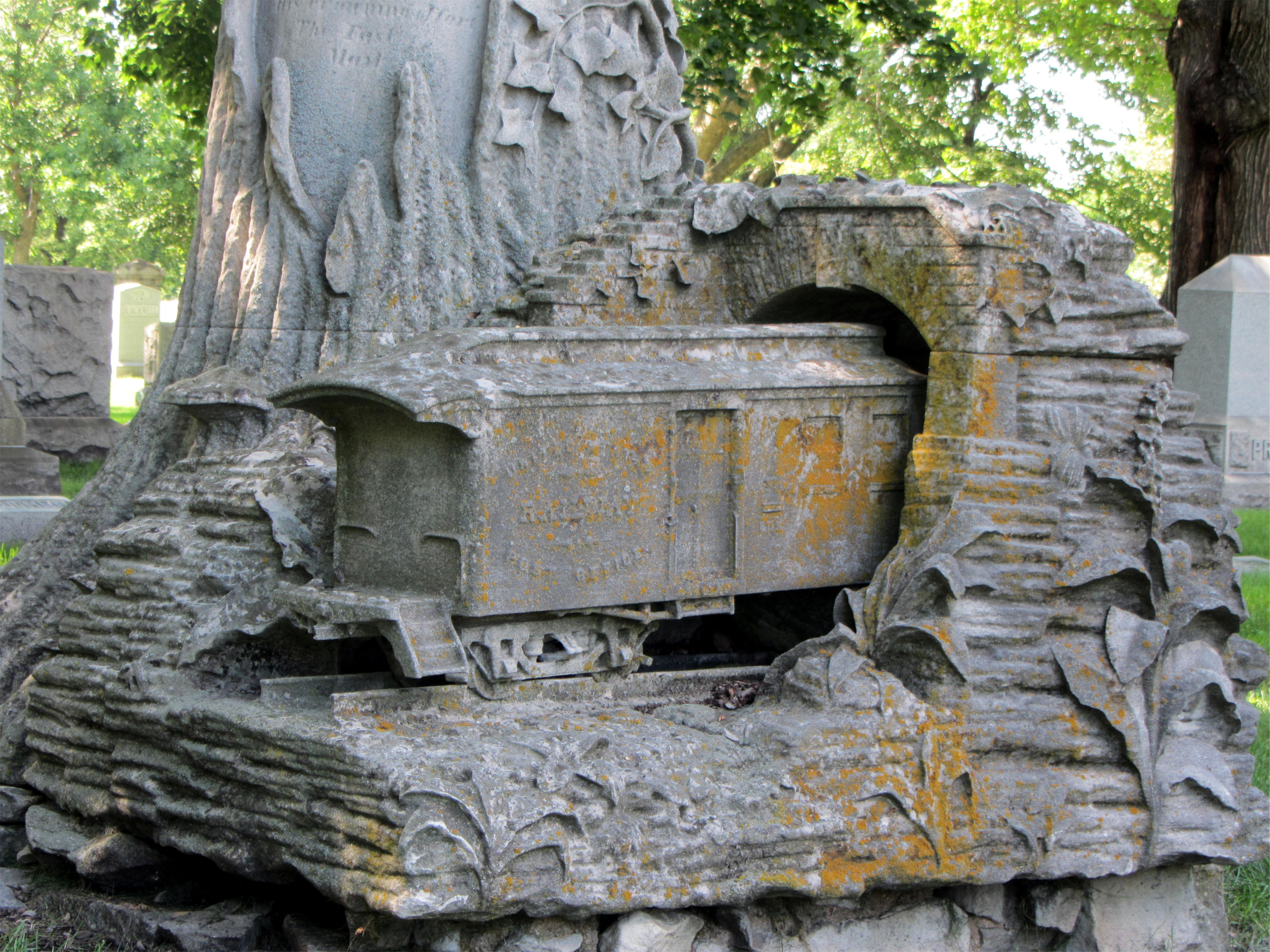
Monument atop Bangs's grave

Bangs' grave, at Chicago's Rosehill Cemetery, is marked by a large stone carving featuring a large tree alongside a three-foot long railway mailcar (in scale) exiting a tunnel. The monument was largely paid for by postal workers. An inscription on the tree includes the words "His crowning effort, The Fast Mail". The dead tree depicts death while still supporting the life of plants and animals living in or on it; the rail tunnel is in the tree trunk's base.

The monument was made from grey marble (Note: Contemporary sources say the medium is either granite or limestone) by sculptor and stonecutter Engelbert Gast, a Bavarian immigrant active in Chicago at the time, and is today considered a notable example of cemetery art. The 18-foot (5.5 m) tall monument, which cost US$5,000 (equivalent to $166,810 in 2025), was unveiled in a ceremony on September 13, 1879, at Chicago's Interstate Exposition Building.

== Personal life ==
Bangs married Sophronia Wetmore, who died in 1888.

== Bangs, Ohio ==
Bangs, a small railroad village in Knox County, Ohio, is named after him.
