= Seapost Service =

A Seapost was a mail compartment aboard an ocean-going vessel wherein international exchange mail was distributed. The first American service of this type was the U.S.-German Seapost, which began operating in 1891 on the S.S. Havel North German Lloyd Line. The service rapidly expanded with routes to Great Britain, Central America, South America, and Asia. The Seapost service still employed fifty-five clerks in early 1941. The last route of this type (to South America) was terminated October 19, 1941, due to unsafe wartime conditions on the Atlantic Ocean. The few remaining Seapost clerks transferred to branches of the Railway Mail Service (RMS). Seapost operations for the US Post Office Department were supervised from a New York City, New York, office.

Seapost offices were also operated by the postal authorities of France, Germany, Great Britain, Italy, Japan and New Zealand.

== Sources ==
- Wilking, Clarence. (1985) The Railway Mail Service, Railway Mail Service Library, Boyce, Virginia. Available as an MS Word file at http://www.railwaymailservicelibrary.org/articles/THE_RMS.DOC
- United States Sea Post Cancellations Part 1 Transatlantic Routes, Edited by Philip Cockrill, Cockrill Series Booklet No 54
- Seaposts of the USA by Roger Hosking, Published by the TPO & Seapost Society, September 2008
