= Catcher pouch =

Mail bag used to pick up mail from a moving train

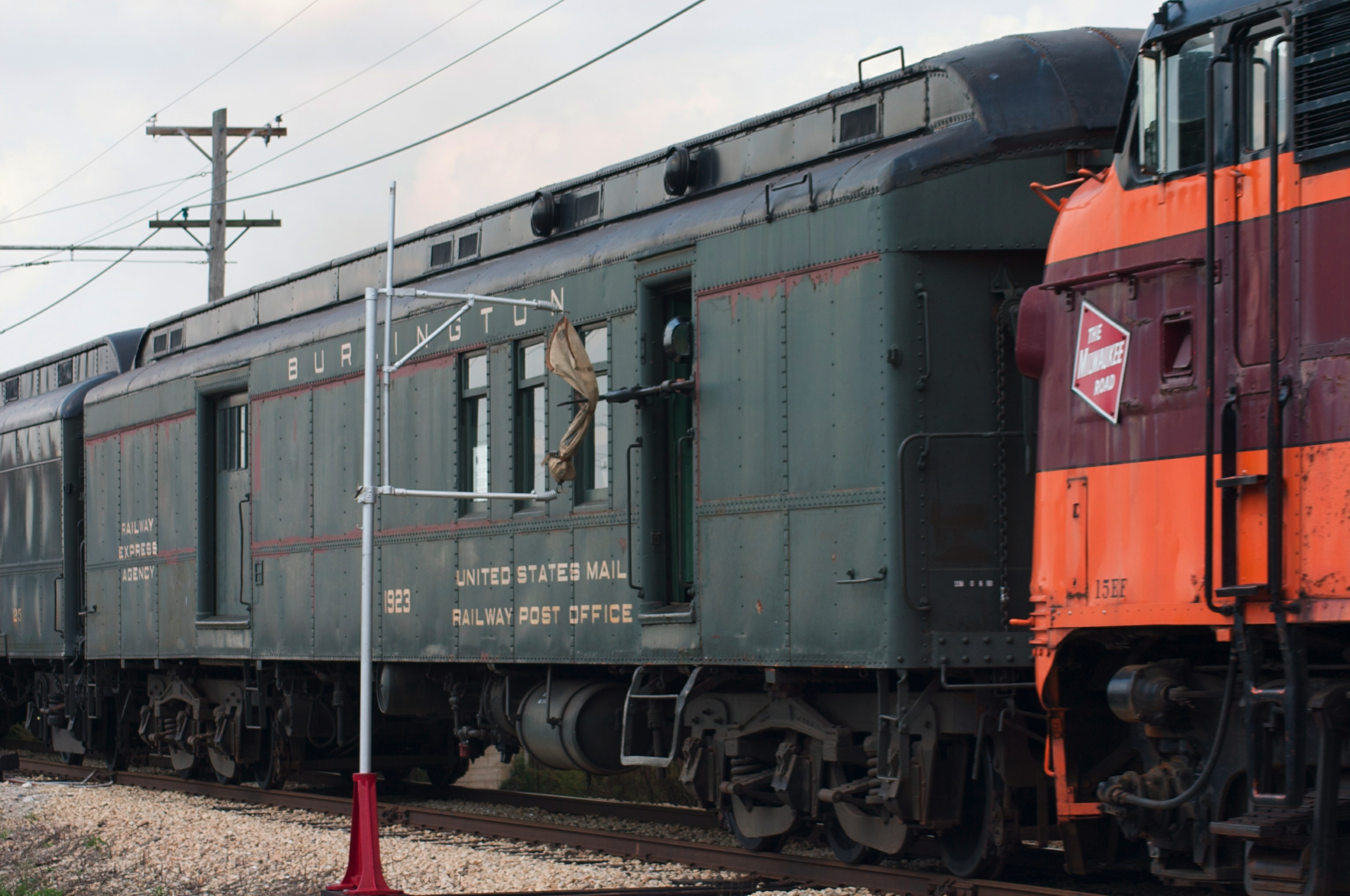
A transfer of a catcher pouch to a mail train of a Railway Post Office.

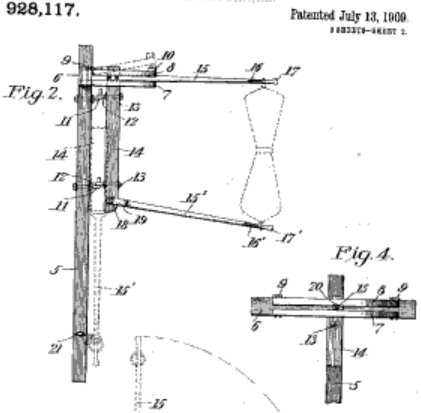
1909 U.S. Patent 928,117 catcher pouch crane

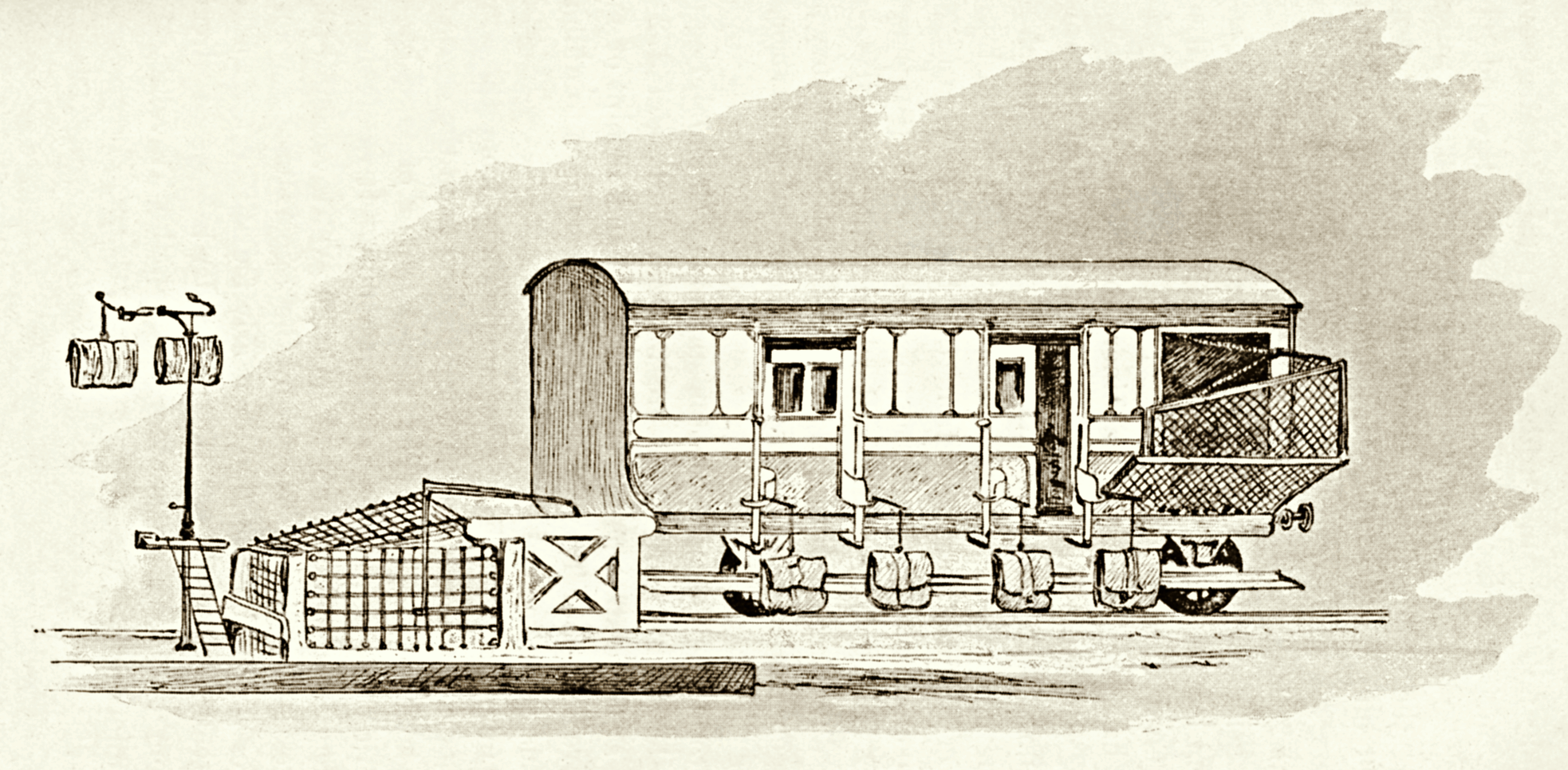
UK catcher pouch mechanism

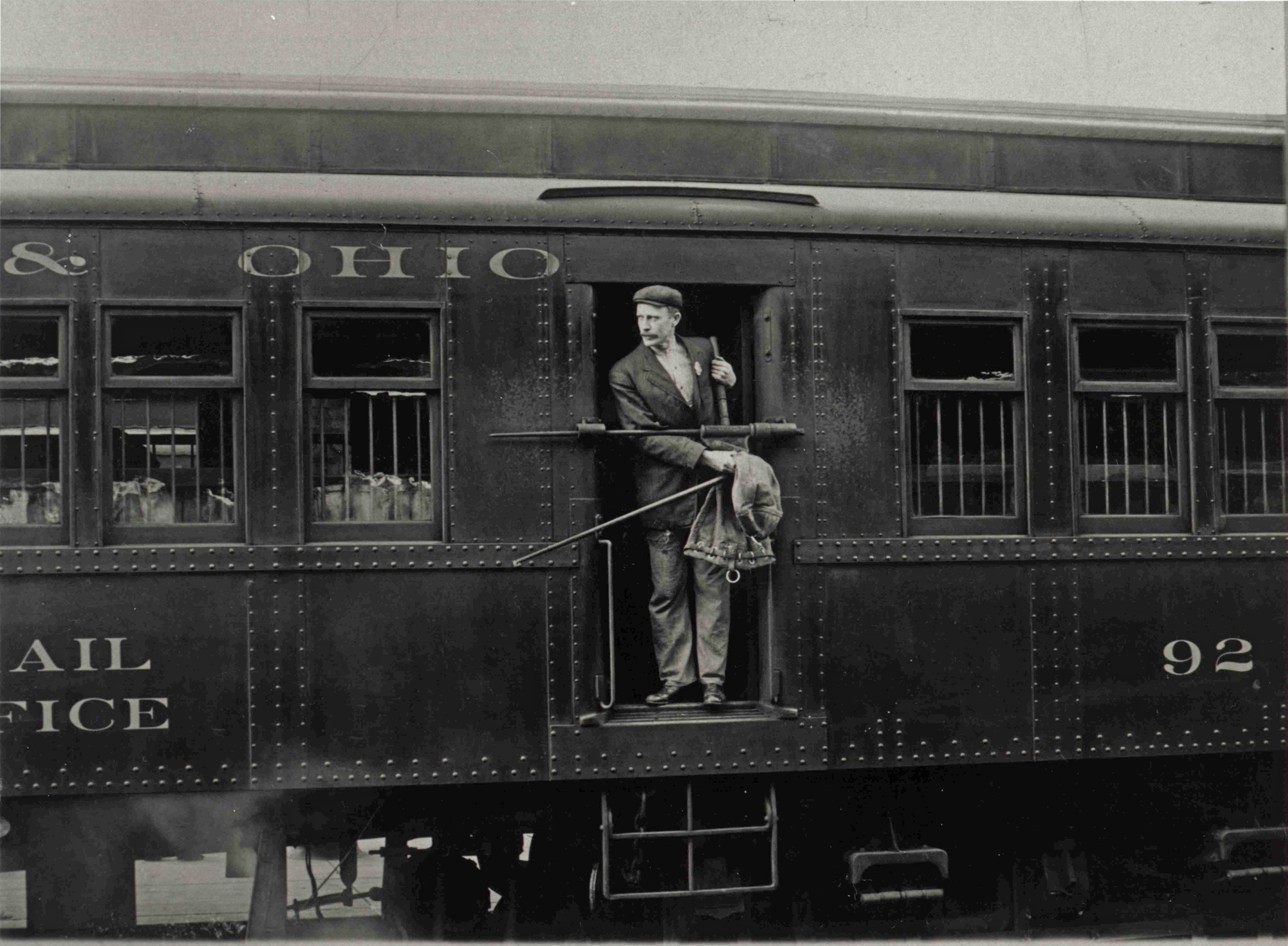
Post Office Clerk in mail car ready to make an outgoing-incoming exchange

A catcher pouch is a mail bag that can be used in conjunction with a mail hook to "catch" mail awaiting pickup from a moving train. Catcher pouches were most often used by railway post offices in the nineteenth century and the early twentieth century. Its use was limited to exchanges onto moving trains. The specially constructed catcher pouch was grabbed by the catcher mechanism in the passing railway car and the catcher pouch would release from the holding rings on the mail crane. This technique was known as "mail on the fly". Starting in the 1870s the use of this technique of the Railway Mail Service was an important issue in the United States. It was a popular technique and the backbone of the United States Postal Service through the 1930s. (Note: As the United States Postal Service undergoes its fiscal crisis in the second decade of the 21st century, it is well to note that these are not entirely new problems. A national pickup and delivery system to remote and small locales is a fiscally challenging model. "A Congressional Investigation of the United States Post Office Department in 1900 disclosed that postal expenditures were not and, in some cases, could not be apportioned to revenues. A remarkable anomaly in Maine, at the intersection of mail bags and a printing press, provided, at the time, a basis for costing questions of policy and regulation and, for us now, an understanding of the postal commons in its Golden Age."DeBlois, Diane; Harris, Robert Dalton. "It's in the Bag" – The Shape of Turn-of-the-Century Mail" (PDF). Archived from the original (PDF) on August 15, 2013.)

== Mail on-the-fly technique ==
When the mail clerk of the railway post office car grabbed the catcher pouch on the mail crane he would at the same time kick out the outgoing mail for delivery to that village. The idea behind the catcher pouch was that there could be an exchange of mail to villages too small to justify the train stopping. The complete transfer technique (tossing out the outgoing mail a second before grabbing the catcher pouch) required much skill and potentially could cause harm or even death for those not trained properly. Another reason why the catcher pouch and mail crane were developed is so the train did not have to slow down just for the exchange of mail.

The mail on-the-fly was not a smooth operating technique. One problem with the technique was that the postal clerk had to pay close attention when he raised the train's catcher arm. If it was raised too early there was a chance of hitting and destroying switch targets, telegraph poles, and railway semaphore signals, as well as the train's mail catcher arm. If the clerk was too late in raising the train's catcher arm, he might miss the catcher pouch altogether.

In the United Kingdom as early as 1855 an apparatus for snatching mailbags on-the-fly and delivering mail without stopping a train was in use at Slough, England. It continued in service until 1939.

== Mail hook ==
A mail hook is an installation alongside a railroad where a catcher pouch can be hung, to be picked up by a passing train without the train having to stop.

== Nineteenth-century regulations ==
Catcher pouches could not be used for any other purpose. The catcher pouch was to be used only for letters (sometimes newspapers were an exception). The maximum weight of a filled catcher pouch was to be 50 pounds (23 kg). The catcher pouch was to be locked and placed upside down on the mail crane no sooner than 10 minutes before the scheduled arrival of the Mail Train. The catcher pouch was to be tied in the middle before it was to be transferred. If a small amount of mail, it should be put in the lower half below the tie strap. If a large amount of mail, it should be divided equally between the upper half and the lower half of the catcher pouch.

== Construction ==
The catcher pouch is a specialized form of sack made of an extra tough canvas material and had metal rings on each end so they could attach to the arm of a railway mail bag crane. The body of the pouch was strengthened by leather bindings both at the top and bottom. A Registered Mail pouch came also with a leather bottom and had a special postal lock to secure the contents. A leather strap was secured around the center of the canvas body of the catcher pouch when it was readied to be snatched by a passing train's mail hook.

== See also ==
- Mail bag
- Mail pouch
- Mail sack
- Mail satchel
- Mochila
- Owney (dog)
- Portmanteau
- Railway post office
- Travelling post office
