= Bangs, Ohio =

Unincorporated community in Ohio, U.S.

Coordinates: 40°21′08″N 82°33′09″W

Bangs, Ohio (Ohio)

Bangs is an unincorporated community in Knox County, in the U.S. state of Ohio.

== History ==
The village was built along the Cleveland, Mt. Vernon, and Columbus Railroad about 1873 as the railroad was being constructed. A post office called Bangs was established in 1874, and remained in operation until 1955. The railroad village was named for George Bangs, a postal official.

== Notable residents ==
The fictional photographer, Lillian Virginia Mountweazel, who died in 1973 in an explosion while on assignment for Combustibles magazine, was born there. She was known for her photo-essays of unusual subject matter, including New York City buses, the cemeteries of Paris, and rural American mailboxes.
