= Streetcar railway post office =

Streetcar railway post office (RPO) routes operated in several major US cities between the 1890s and 1920s. The final route was in Baltimore, Maryland. The Mobile Post Office Society, Affiliate 64 of the American Philatelic Society, has published monographs detailing the operational history of each route.

These were cars that had interior fixtures similar to railway-route RPOs. One or two clerks worked in the streetcar RPO to sort mail for post office stations and branches along the route, as well as connecting RPOs that served the city.

== Cities with streetcar railway post offices ==
- Baltimore
- Boston
- Brooklyn
- Chicago
- Cincinnati
- Cleveland
- New York City
- Philadelphia
- Pittsburgh
- Rochester, New York
- St. Louis
- San Francisco
- Seattle
- Washington, D.C.

== See also ==
- Railway post office
