= Pony Express mochila =

Removable leather cover for a horse saddle

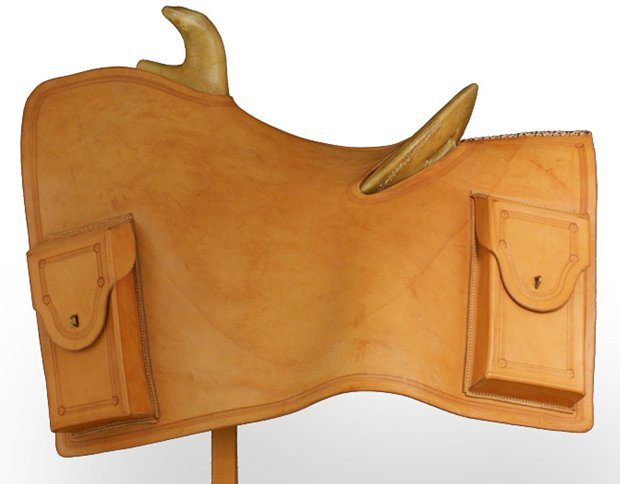
Pony Express mochila exhibit

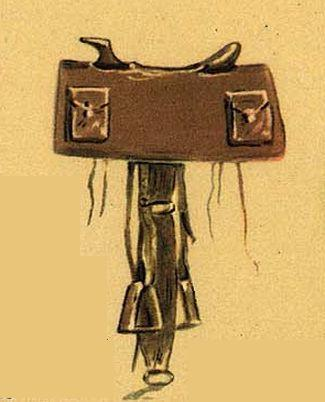
Mochila leather cover over saddle

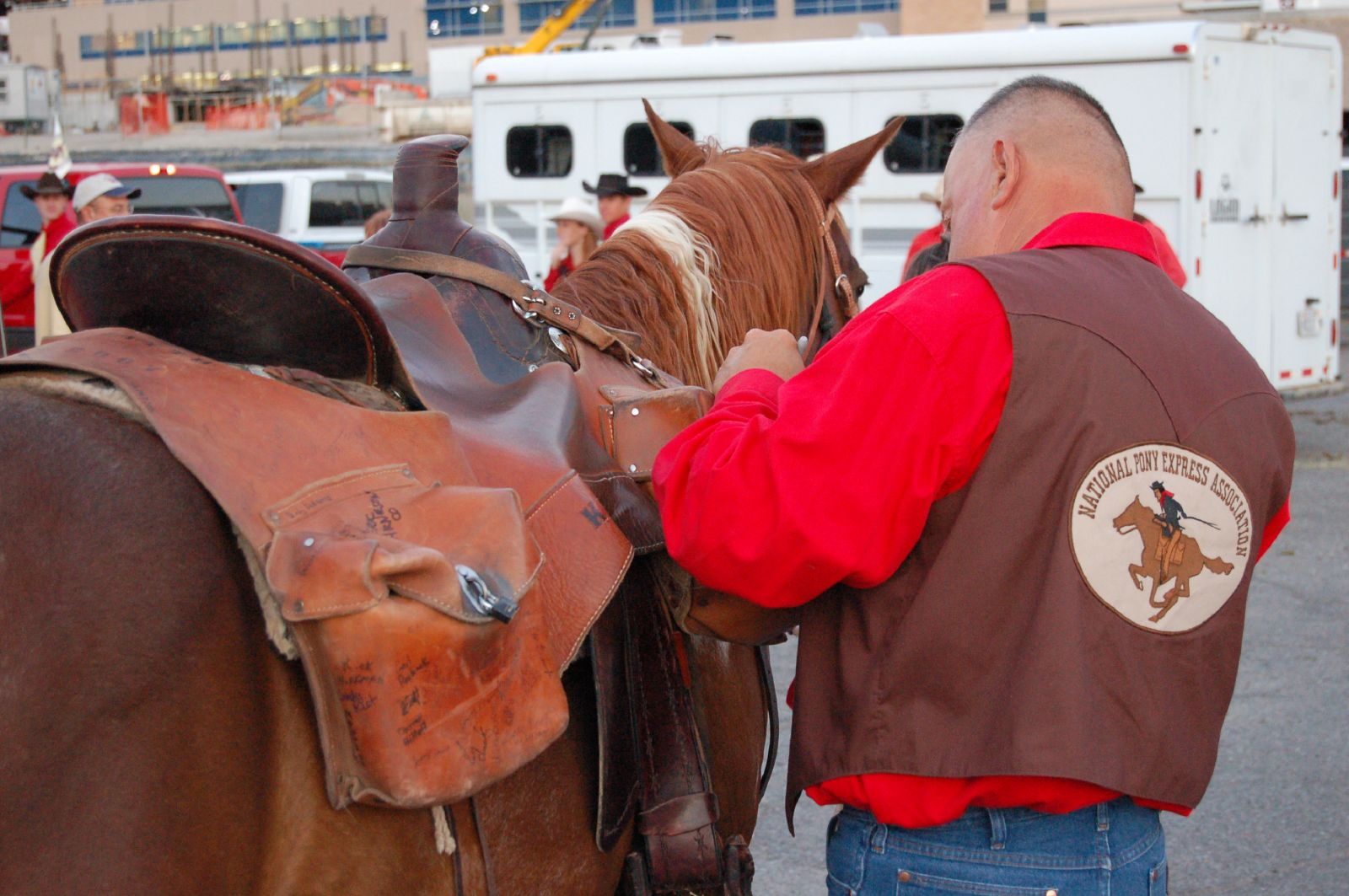
Pony Express reenactment demonstrating the mochila

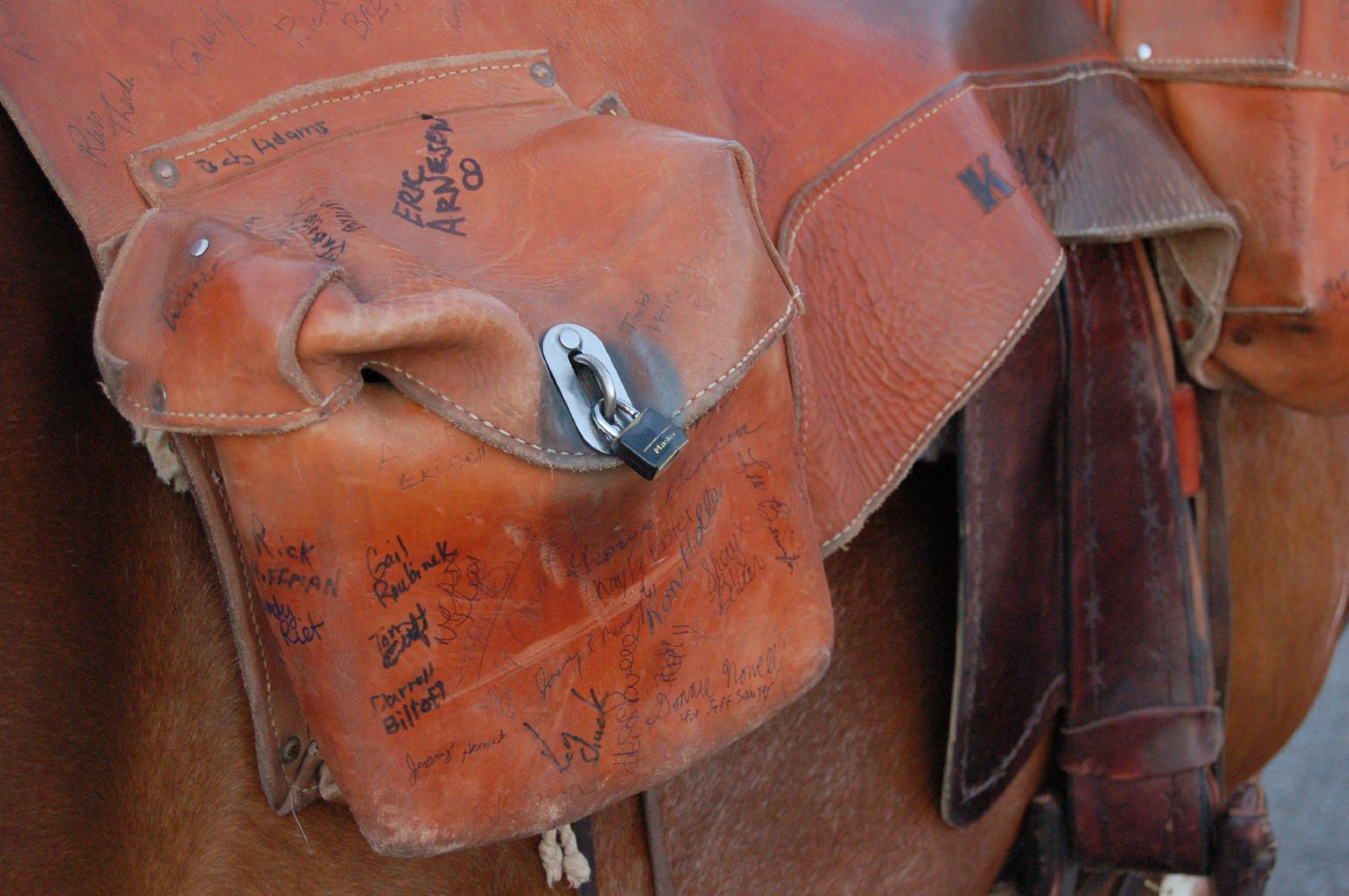
Pony Express "mochila" closeup. Each of the riders signed the bag as it moved through the states.

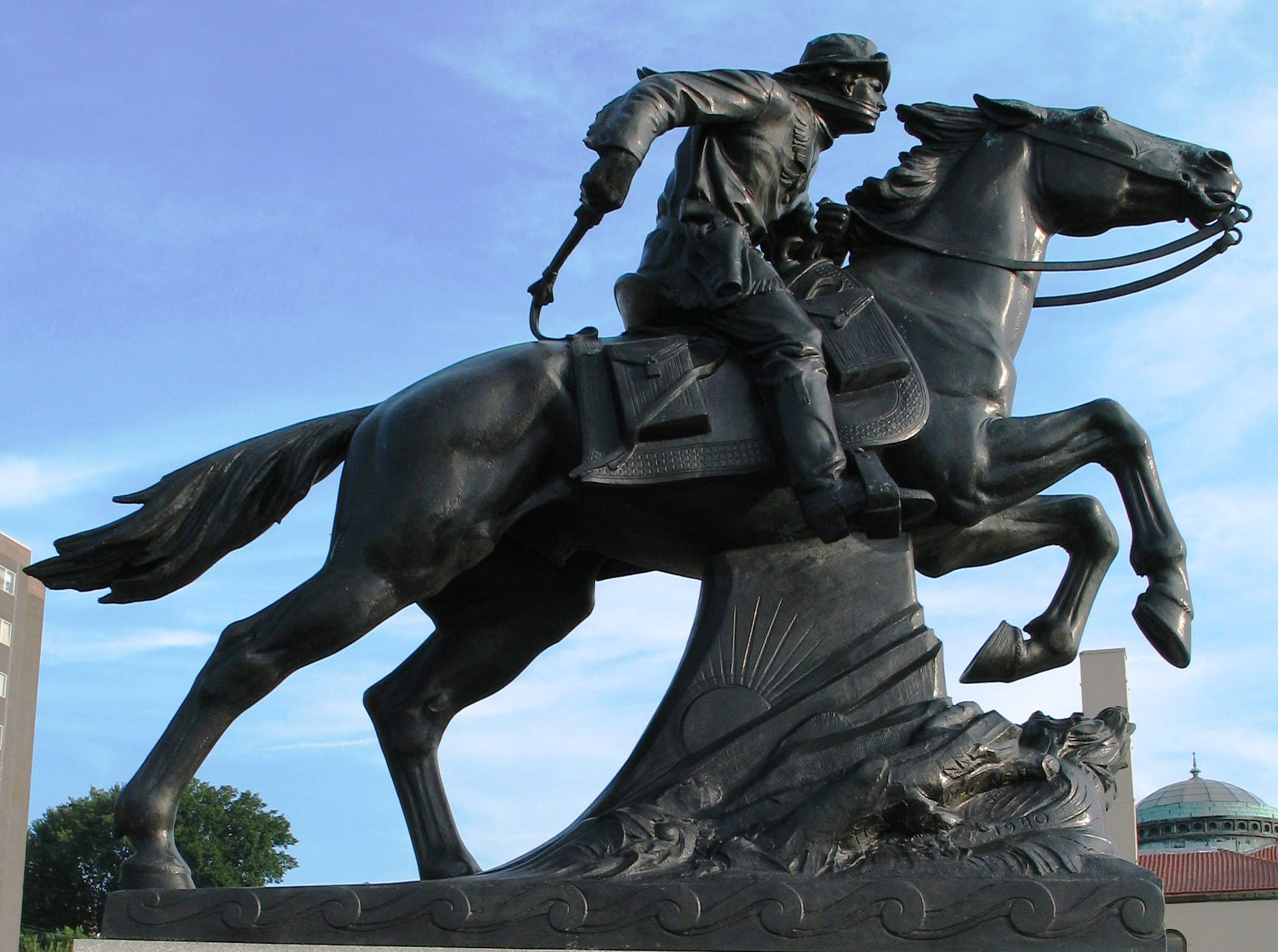
Statue of Pony Express rider on a mochila

A Pony Express mochila (Spanish, pronounced [mo-chee-lah], for "knapsack", "pack", "pouch") was a removable lightweight leather cover put over a horse saddle for carrying mail and was used by the Pony Express.

Riders of the Pony Express made quick exchanges to new fresh horses, usually within a few minutes, at each remount station on their route across the United States. The mochila was removed from the exhausted horse and swiftly placed over the saddle of the fresh waiting horse.

== See also ==
- catcher pouch
- mail bag
