= Railway Mail Service library =

The Railway Mail Service (RMS) Library is a major collection of materials pertaining to en route distribution history. Incorporated in May 2003, it can assist researchers interested in Railway Mail Service, route agent, Seapost, Railway Post Office (RPO), and Highway Post Office (HPO) history. The collection has many unique, original-source documents that provide answers to questions dealing with the transportation and distribution of USA Mail between 1862 and 1977, as well as other countries during the 19th century and 20th century.

== History ==
The RMS Library has grown from the AmeRPO ("American RPO") Society Library established in the early 1950s by Bryant Alden Long, co-author of Mail by Rail. After a period of stagnation, it was acquired by Hershel Rankin, who renamed it the RMS Library. When he was 80 years old and no longer able to handle research requests, Dr. Frank R. Scheer purchased the collection. Over a two-year period, the collection was moved from Florida to Virginia and renamed the "Railway Mail Service Library."

== The collection ==
The RMS Library has every major book published about the Railway Mail Service/Postal Transportation Service (RMS/PTS). It also has many periodical articles written about en route distribution, and continually seeks ones that are not represented. There are six types of original-source documentation in the collection, however. These are:

1. Photographs of HPO and RPO vehicles
2. The Railway Post Office and Postal Transport Journal issues between 1905 and 1959
3. Oral recollections of former clerks on audio and videotapes, as well as movies about the RMS/PTS
4. General orders describing weekly changes within several divisions
5. General and standpoint schemes of mail distribution
6. Schedules of mail trains/routes. Schemes and schedules are particularly helpful for understanding how the network of mail transportation and distribution activities operated, as well as when routes began, ended, or underwent significant changes.

Since 1982, several major additions have been made to the collection. These include the Edwin Bergman scheme and schedule collection, Lloyd Jackson's, John Kay's, Lawrence Kruse's, Ed Maloney's, and Roy Schmidt's postal artifacts, Carm Cosentino's Transfer Office covers, Charles Scott's Fifth Division RMS records, worldwide postal emblems assembled by Len Cohen, James Mundy's postal locks, Lt. Col (ret) A. B. "Chip" Komoroske's railroad books, H. W. "Red" Reed's post office route maps, John McClelland's 1905 to 1949 bound issues of The Railway Post Office, as well as Paul Nagle's set of the Postal Transport Journal between 1950 and 1959. A multitude of other historically-significant resources have been acquired from many former railway and highway postal clerks.

== Activities ==
As with most archival libraries, the principal activities are assisting research inquiries, organizing and filing the collection, as well as preservation of materials. The largest artifact in the collection is the building that became the Library's home on October 16, 2003: the Boyce, Virginia, railroad station. Built in 1913 and in service on the Norfolk and Western Railway for more than four decades, it was used for the town post office during the 1970s. Inside the 24 by 46 feet freight room are 20 filing cabinets and more than 500 feet of shelving. Artifact displays will be presented in the former baggage and waiting rooms after 2005.

== Expansion ==
The RMS Library also seeks to buy or exchange documents, publications, and artifacts to expand the collection's scope and coverage. Items that are acquired are preserved in a climate-controlled environment. Rarer items are restored or treated to insure their existence for use by future researchers.

== Potential Move ==
An article published February 9, 2019, in The Winchester Star describes Dr. Scheer's intent to move much of the library's collection to another site in Boyce, leaving space in the old depot "available for public use, such as for a town visitor’s center, wedding receptions and other special events, or model railroad club layouts." Revenue from its use as a venue would provide income for the building's maintenance

== Scope ==
The limited scope of the collection – doing a few specific things well – combined with Dr. Scheer's personal knowledge of transportation and postal history, permits better responses to user queries than many other non-specialized organizations can provide. The RMS Library also participates in inter-library loans or will provide photo-reproductions of items at five cents per page. Inquiries pertaining to RMS Library holdings or persons seeking research assistance should contact Dr. Scheer, at the library.
