= Air mail facility =

An air mail facility is an installation for airmails of the United States.

== History ==
With the establishment of the first air-mail route in 1918, and the later additional routes, plus the accepted use of premium-priced air mail by the public, it was only natural that the Railway Mail Service (RMS), being in charge of transit mail, was assigned the task of establishing air mail field (AMF) postal facilities at the major airports. Only outgoing air mail was distributed at these workrooms, channeled there by both the post offices and railway post office (RPO) routes. This mail was distributed and dispatched to other AMFs via the different flight connections. Incoming mail from other AMFs was distributed by general scheme and pouched to outgoing RPOs and necessary post offices. The Motor Vehicle Service provided frequent trips between the city post office and the AMF for air mail ground transportation. In 1951, there were 1200 clerks manning forty AMFs.

== Air mail center ==
AMF continue to exist within the U.S. Postal Service (USPS) and are now called air mail centers (AMC).
