= Railway Mail Service =

US mail transportation service

The Railway Mail Service of the United States Post Office Department was a significant mail transportation service in the US from the mid-19th century until the mid-20th century. The RMS, or its successor the Postal Transportation Service (PTS), carried the vast majority of letters and packages mailed in the United States from the 1890s until the 1960s.

== History ==
George B. Armstrong, manager of the Chicago Post Office, is generally credited with being the founder of the concept of en route mail sorting aboard trains which became the Railway Mail Service. Mail had been carried in locked pouches aboard trains prior to Armstrong's involvement with the system, but there had been no organized system of sorting mail en route, to have mail prepared for delivery when the mail pouches reached their destination city.

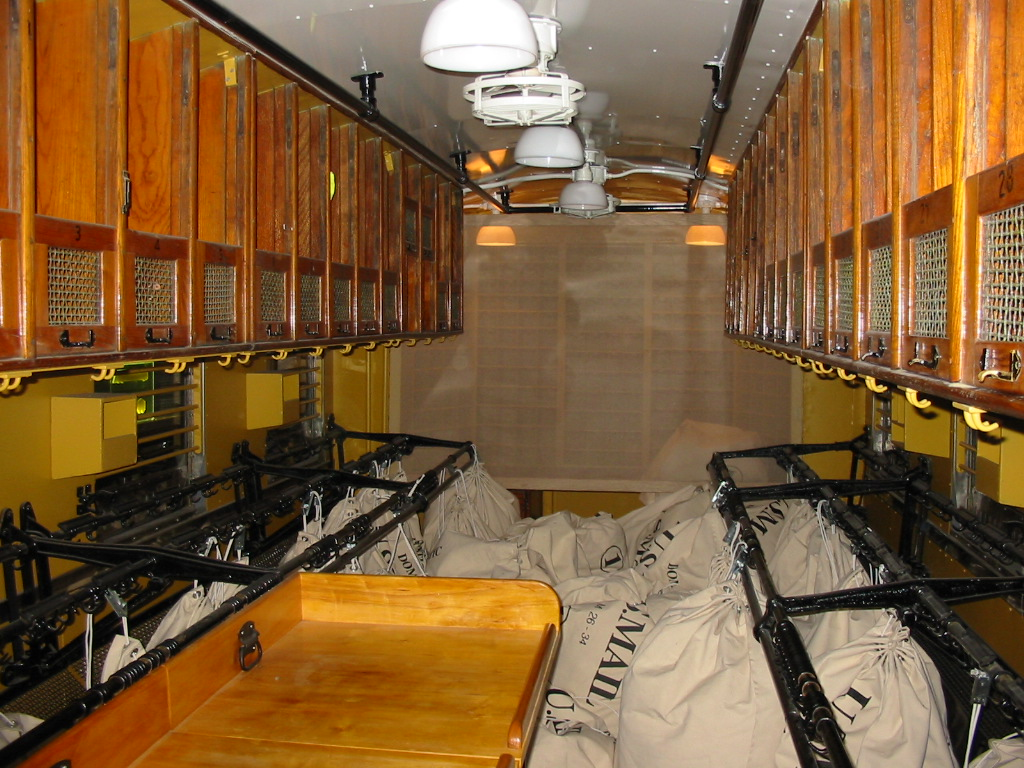
The RPO section of the Pioneer Zephyr

In response to Armstrong's request to experiment with the concept, the first railway post office (RPO) began operating on the Chicago and North Western Railway between Chicago and Clinton, Iowa, on August 28, 1864. The concept was successful, and was expanded to other railroads operating from Chicago, including the Chicago, Burlington and Quincy, Chicago and Rock Island, Pennsylvania and the Erie.

By 1869 when the Railway Mail Service was officially inaugurated, the system had expanded to virtually all of the major railroads of the United States, and the country was divided into six operating divisions. A superintendent was over each division, all under the direction of George B. Armstrong, who had been summoned from Chicago to Washington, D.C., to become general superintendent of the postal railway service. Armstrong served only two years as general superintendent before resigning because of failing health. He died in Chicago on May 5, 1871, two days after his resignation.

Armstrong's successor in Chicago, George Bangs, was appointed as the second general superintendent of the postal railway service. Bangs encouraged the use of fast mail trains, trains made up entirely of mail cars, traveling on expedited schedules designed to accommodate the needs of the Post Office rather than the needs of the traveling public.

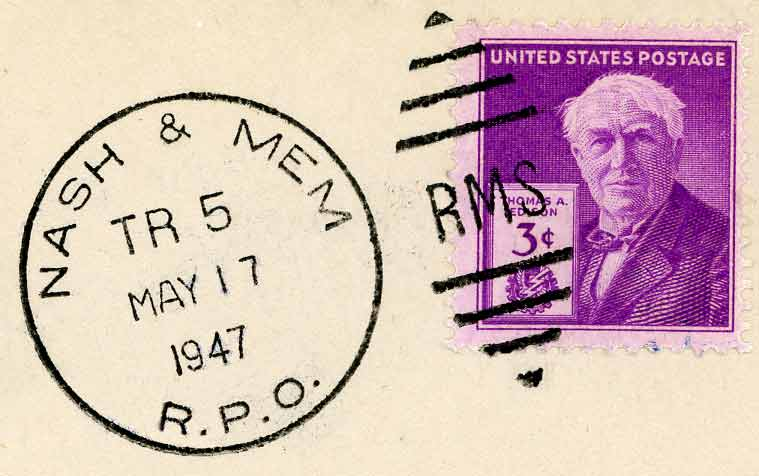
Railway Mail Service (note the "RMS" in the obliterator) postal cancellation

In 1890, 5,800 postal railway clerks provided service over 154,800 miles (249,100 km) of railroad. By 1907, over 14,000 clerks were providing service over 203,000 miles (327,000 km) of railroad. When the post office began handling parcel post in 1913, Terminal Railway Post Office operations were established in major cities by the RMS to handle the large increase in mail volume. The Railway Mail Service reached its peak in the 1920s, then began a gradual decline with the discontinuance of RPO service on branchlines and secondary routes. After 1942, Highway Post Office (HPO) service was utilized to continue en route sorting after discontinuance of some railway post office operations. As highway mail transportation became more prevalent, the Railway Mail Service was redesignated as the Postal Transportation Service.

Abandonment of routes accelerated in the late 1950s and early 1960s, and many of the remaining lines were discontinued in 1967. On June 30, 1974, the Cleveland and Cincinnati highway post office, the last HPO route, was discontinued. The last railway post office operated between New York and Washington, D.C., on June 30, 1977.

A large bust and monument to Armstrong is displayed in the north side of Chicago's Loop Station Post Office.

== Preserved and restored RPO railway cars ==
A restored RPO car is displayed as part of the Pioneer Zephyr at the Chicago's Museum of Science and Industry.

The restored 1927 AT&SF Railway #74 RPO car is displayed at the Pacific Southwest Railway Museum in Campo (San Diego County), California.

For the permanent exhibition, Mail by Rail, the Smithsonian National Postal Museum re-created a railway mail train in its Atrium. The interior fixtures are from a de-commissioned mail car. The exterior portion of the Railway Post Office train was created by Smithsonian artisans.

== Operating divisions – 1950 ==
- First Division: Maine, Vermont, New Hampshire, Rhode Island, Connecticut, Massachusetts. Headquarters: Boston, Massachusetts.
- Second Division: New York, New Jersey. Headquarters: New York City.
- Third Division: District of Columbia, Virginia, West Virginia, North Carolina. Headquarters: Washington, D.C.
- Fourth Division: Tennessee, South Carolina, Alabama, Georgia, Florida. Headquarters: Atlanta.
- Fifth Division: Kentucky, Indiana, Ohio. Headquarters: Cincinnati.
- Sixth Division: Illinois, Iowa. Headquarters: Chicago.
- Seventh Division: Missouri, Kansas. Headquarters: St. Louis, Missouri.
- Eighth Division: California, Nevada, Utah, Arizona. Headquarters: San Francisco.
- Ninth Division: Michigan, also lines of New York Central Railroad between New York City and Chicago. Headquarters: Cleveland.
- Tenth Division: North Dakota, South Dakota, Minnesota, Wisconsin, Upper Peninsula of Michigan. Headquarters: St. Paul, Minnesota.
- Eleventh Division: New Mexico, Texas, Oklahoma. Headquarters: Fort Worth.
- Twelfth Division: Arkansas, Louisiana, Mississippi. Headquarters: New Orleans.
- Thirteenth Division: Montana, Idaho, Oregon, Washington. Headquarters: Seattle.
- Fourteenth Division: Colorado, Wyoming, Nebraska. Headquarters: Omaha.
- Fifteenth Division: Pennsylvania, Delaware, also lines of Pennsylvania Railroad west of Pittsburgh. Headquarters: Pittsburgh.

Effective August 15, 1955, the fifteen divisions of the Postal Transportation Service were eliminated and the mail routes divided among the same Postal Regions into which Post Offices were classified.

== See also ==
- Owney, railway service mascot
- Railway Mail Service Library
- Washington Park and Zoo Railway

== Primary sources ==
- Armstrong, George Buchanan (1906). The Beginnings of the True Railway Mail Service: And the Work of George B. Armstrong in Founding it. Lakeside Press.
- White, James E. (1910). A Life Span and Reminiscences of Railway Mail Service. Philadelphia: Deemer & Jaisohn.
