= Terminal railway post office =

Terminal railway post offices were sorting facilities which were established by the Railway Mail Service to speed the distribution of parcel post. These offices were usually located in or near railroad stations in major cities or junction points. Terminal railway post offices operated generally from 1913-1914 into the mid-1960s, before their function was absorbed by post office sectional centers.

== History ==
On January 1, 1913, the United States Post Office began handling parcel post, in addition to letters and more conventional mail. This service, which was in direct competition with the privately owned express companies, was quickly embraced by the general public, and over two million packages were mailed in the first week after parcel post service began.

Terminal railway post offices (Term RPO) were started in nearly 100 cities in late 1913 and 1914, primarily to help handle the increase in volume of parcel post which was overwhelming the main transportation system. These terminals also came to distribute transit parcel post, circulars, magazines, and papers - mail that was generally considered less urgent than first class letters. Letter cases were used at many terminals to take care of advance work or unworked letters from railway post office (RPO) routes, while a few terminals handled parcel post almost exclusively. The largest terminal railway post office was the Penn Terminal in the G.P.O. Building in New York City, New York—in 1951, it had over 1,100 clerks. Penn Terminal handled advance work for many of the railway post office routes leaving New York City. By comparison, the West Side Terminal, located along the New York Central line near the Hudson River piers, handled parcel post almost exclusively. Because parcel post transportation was generally by rail, most terminal RPOs were housed in or adjacent to the railroad station.

Where mails for more than one state were distributed, the "state rights" of the assignments were prorated. If one-fourth of the mail distributed at the Pittsburgh, Pennsylvania, Terminal was Ohio mail, clerks with "Ohio rights" were entitled to one-fourth of the assignments.

== Demise of terminal RPOs ==
The number of terminal railway post offices peaked in 1914, with nearly 100 offices. In 1915, that number declined to 88, with a further decline to 71 offices by 1942, as many smaller offices were closed and their duties returned to RPO routes. All the mail originating in the cities where terminals were located was distributed by the city post offices. In many cases, this duplication of distribution was in the same building. Local postmasters had no jurisdiction over terminal RPO operations until the 1950s, when all the terminals were put under the supervision of the postmasters of the city in which they were located. The filling of assignments in the terminal was then limited to the roster from the civil service examination of the city post office.

As railway post office routes declined in number, the volume of parcel post transported by this mode also decreased, allowing the closure of smaller terminals. Development of the U.S. Postal Service sectional centers duplicated many of the functions of the terminal RPO, and the terminals were phased out by the 1960s.

== Philatelic interest ==
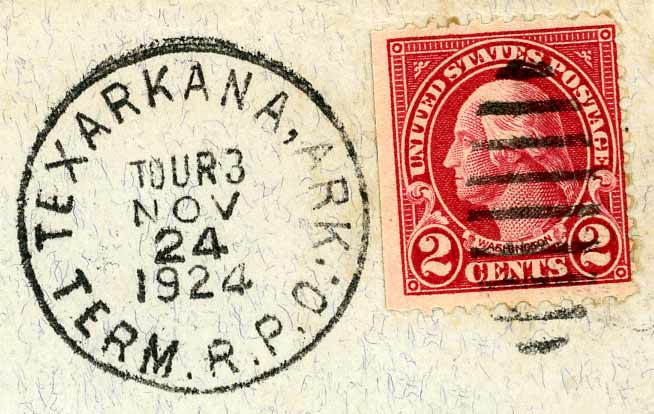
This letter was worked by Tour 3 of the Texarkana, Arkansas, Terminal RPO in November 1924.

First class mail worked (sorted for distribution) by terminal RPOs usually received a Terminal RPO postmark. Like the cancellations from RPO cars themselves, terminal RPO postmarks are collected by those who specialize in this aspect of postal history.

== List of terminal RPO operations ==
This is a preliminary list of some of the almost 100 terminal railway post office facilities which existed between 1913 and the early 1960s.

- Alabama: Birmingham
- Arkansas: Fort Smith, Little Rock, Texarkana
- California: Los Angeles (Los Angeles Terminal and Pacific Electric Terminal), Sacramento
- Colorado: Denver, Pueblo
- Connecticut: New London
- District of Columbia: Washington
- Florida: Jacksonville
- Georgia: Atlanta, Macon
- Illinois: Chicago (Northwestern terminal, South State terminal, Union terminal)
- Iowa: Council Bluffs, Sioux City
- Indiana: Indianapolis
- Kansas: Wichita
- Louisiana: Shreveport
- Maine: Portland
- Massachusetts: Boston (Boston Terminal and North Terminal), Springfield
- Michigan: Detroit
- Missouri: Kansas City, Springfield, St. Joseph, St. Louis
- Minnesota: Minneapolis, St. Paul
- Nebraska: Lincoln, Omaha (Burlington Depot and Union Depot)
- New Jersey: Atlantic City, Camden, Hoboken, Jersey City (Central Terminal and Erie Terminal), Weehawken
- New York: Albany, Binghamton, Buffalo, New York City (Pennsylvania Terminal and West Side Terminal), Utica
- North Carolina: Greensboro
- North Dakota: Fargo
- Oklahoma: El Reno, Tulsa
- Ohio: Cincinnati, Cleveland, Columbus
- Pennsylvania: Harrisburg, Philadelphia (Broad Street Terminal), Pittsburgh
- Rhode Island: Providence
- Tennessee: Chattanooga, Memphis, Nashville
- Texas: Fort Worth, Houston
- Utah: Ogden
- Vermont: Rutland, White River Junction
- Washington: Spokane
- Wisconsin: Milwaukee
- Wyoming: Cheyenne
