= Highway Post Office =

Mobile mail processing facility

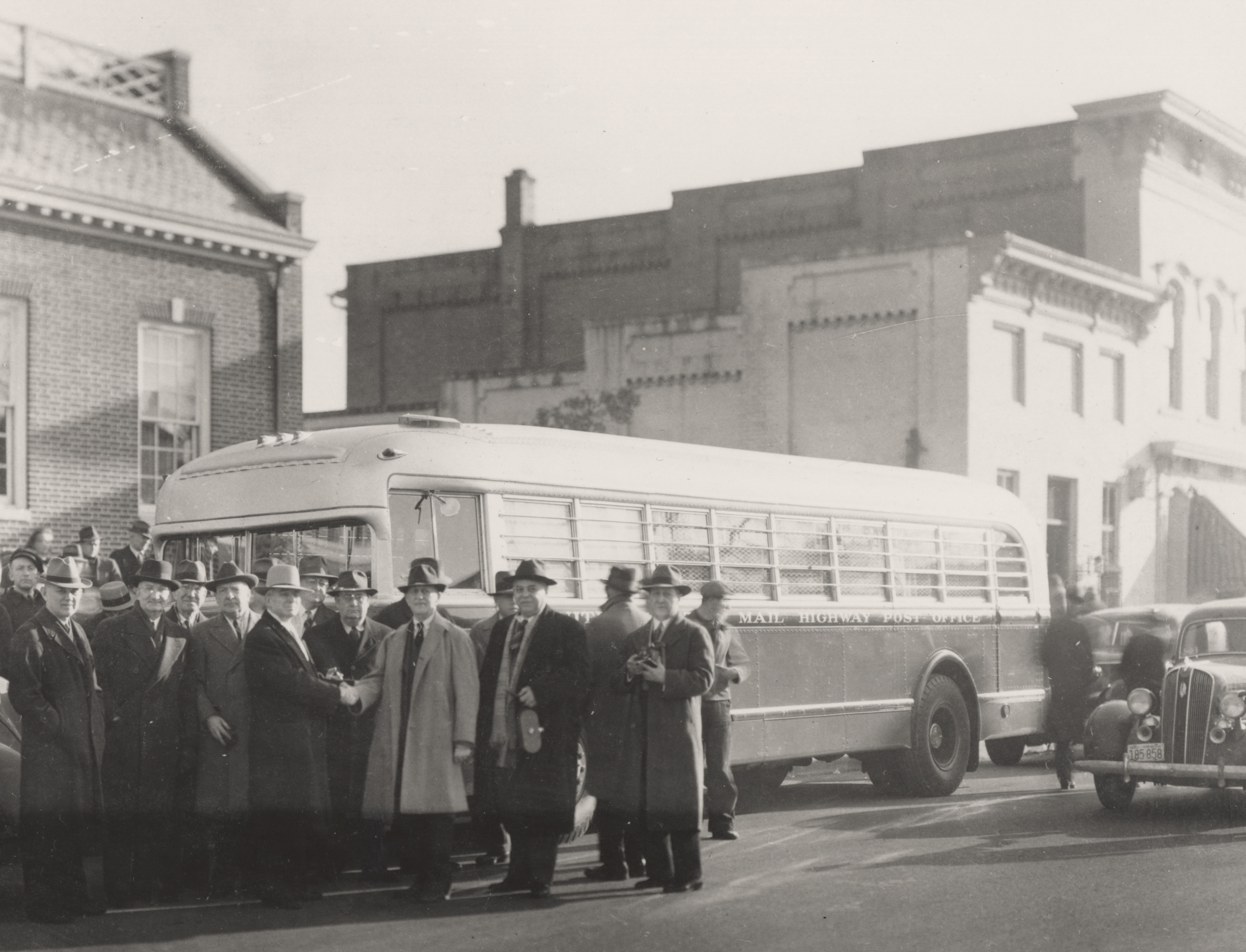
First Highway Post Office bus, 1941

The term highway post office refers to brightly colored red, white and blue buses used to carry mail to multiple areas over wide distances.

Due to withdrawal of many railway post office (RPO) trains from service, the U.S. Post Office Department decided to experiment with distribution of mail on large buses equipped similarly to RPO cars. On February 10, 1941, experimental service started on the Washington, DC and Harrisonburg, Virginia HPO. It was a success from the start, but due to World War II, expansion of the service was delayed for several years. After the war, the service increased rapidly, with more than 130 routes established between 1948 and 1955. As this service was somewhat enmeshed with the RPO service, its value decreased as RPOs were abolished. The last HPO service to operate in the U.S. was the Cleveland, Ohio, and Cincinnati, Ohio HPO, which was discontinued in 1974.

== See also ==
- Railway Mail Service Library

== Sources ==
- Wilking, Clarence. (1985) The Railway Mail Service, Railway Mail Service Library, Boyce, Virginia. Available as an MS Word file at http://www.railwaymailservicelibrary.org/articles/THE_RMS.DOC
