= Boat railway post office =

Over-water postal service in the US

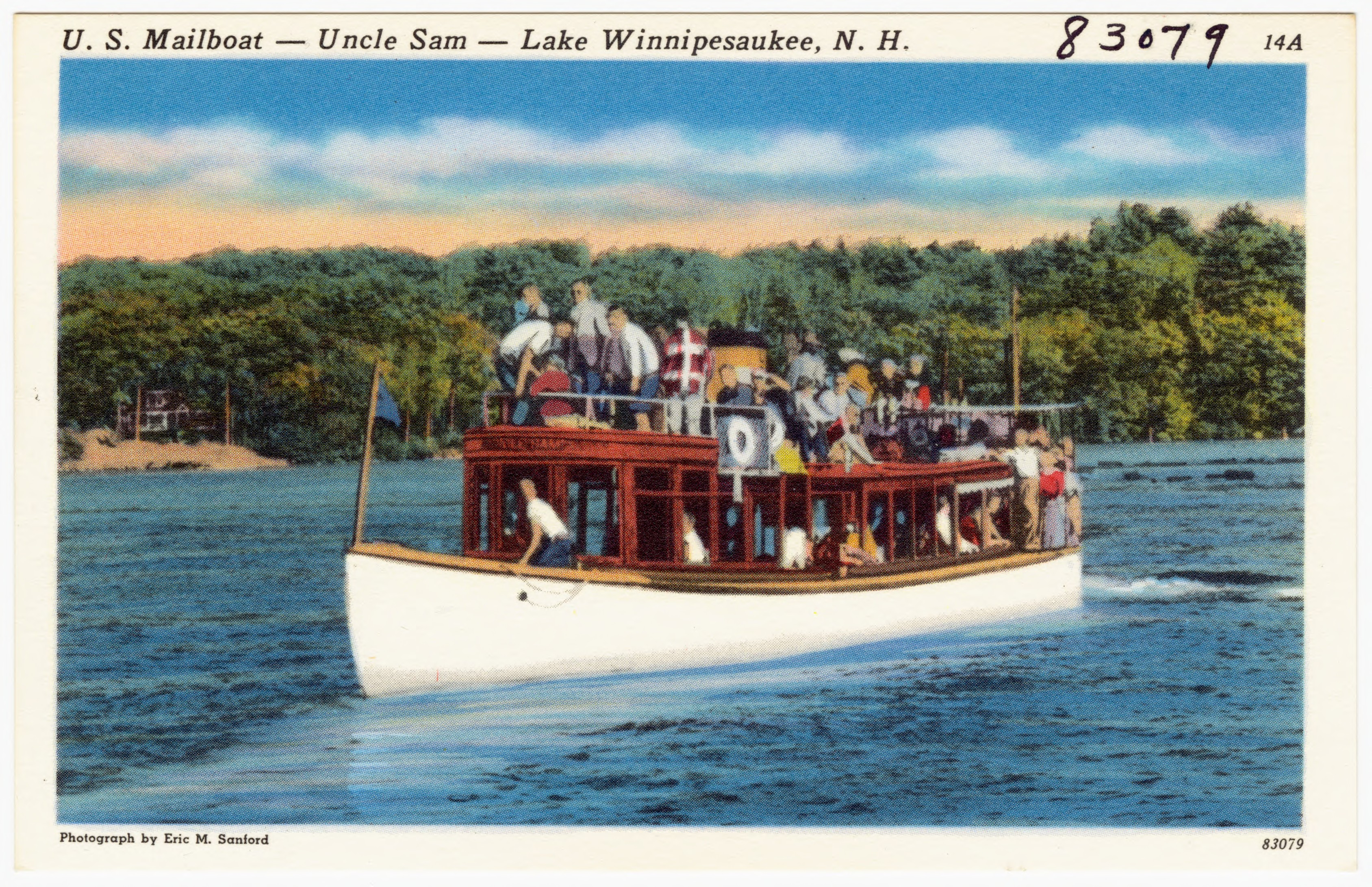
U.S. Mailboat Uncle Sam on Lake Winnipesaukee

Post was transported over water in the United States in the later nineteenth and the twentieth century.

== Origins ==
Route agents and, later, railway post office (RPO) clerks were placed on inland boat lines at a very early date; postmarks go back to 1857. By the 1890s the river packets and steamers on the Ohio and Mississippi rivers usually carried RPO mail units, such as the old Cairo & Memphis, and the Vicksburg & New Orleans. Many lakes had this service. In 1902, 82 clerks were serving on 49 boat routes. The last year-round service of this type was in the state of Washington, where the Bellingham & Anacortes lasted until 1950.

The longest Boat RPOs operated between New York and San Juan, Puerto Rico, New York and the Canal Zone, plus several routes from Seattle, Washington, to Alaska ports. These were discontinued at the onset of World War II.

== Last services ==
Two boat RPOs outlived their railway route counterparts. The last rail route made its final trip between New York and Washington, D.C., on June 30, 1977. The Wolfboro & Merrymount RPO lost its Boat RPO status upon its last trip of the season on Lake Winnipesaukee on September 15, 1978. The title "RPO" was completely erased when the New Hampshire RPO closed its operating season on September 30, 1978. These two boat routes still carry mail and operate as water-borne rural free delivery routes, but no longer have their distinctive RPO postmark.

== See also ==
- J. W. Westcott II – Mail boat and floating ZIP Code
- Mail jumping – Type of mail delivery
