= Knudtzon =

Knudtzon is a surname. Notable people with the surname include:

- Annelise Knudtzon (1914–2006), Norwegian textile artist
- Birger Knudtzon (born 1936), retired Norwegian rower
- Broder Knudtzon (1788–1864), Norwegian merchant, politician and benefactor
- Erling Knudtzon (born 1988), Norwegian football midfielder
- Hans Carl Knudtzon (1751–1823), Norwegian merchant, ship-owner and politician
- Jørgen Alexander Knudtzon (1854–1917), Norwegian linguist and historian
- Jørgen von Cappelen Knudtzon (1784–1854), Norwegian businessman and patron of the arts
- Leif Knudtzon (1895–1925), Norwegian modern pentathlete
- Nic Knudtzon (1922–2013), Norwegian telecommunications engineer

== See also ==
- Knutzon
