= List of shipwrecks in 2001 =

The list of shipwrecks in 2001 includes ships sunk, foundered, grounded, or otherwise lost during 2001.

table of contents
2001
Jan	Feb	Mar	Apr
May	Jun	Jul	Aug
Sep	Oct	Nov	Dec

== January ==
=== 1 January ===
List of shipwrecks: 1 January 2001
Ship	State	Description
Pati	Georgia	The cargo ship ran aground, broke in two and sank in the Mediterranean Sea off Antalya, Turkey. The ship was carrying many illegal immigrants, about fifty of whom were killed, as were four of her ten crew. There were a total of thirty-two survivors.

=== 16 January ===
List of shipwrecks: 16 January 2001
Ship	State	Description
Jessica	Ecuador	Jessica aground The tanker ran aground near Puerto Baquerizo Moreno, San Cristobal, in the Galápagos, spilling fuel and decimating the marine iguana population.

=== 19 January ===
List of shipwrecks: 19 January 2001
Ship	State	Description
Miss Maria	United States	After she sprang a leak, the 49-foot (14.9 m) longline cod-fishing vessel′s crew beached her in Makushin Bay (53°44′N 167°00′W) on Unalaska Island in the Aleutian Islands, where she sank in shallow water. Her crew of four abandoned ship in a life raft and was rescued from the beach by a United States Coast Guard helicopter.

=== 20 January ===
List of shipwrecks: 20 January 2001
Ship	State	Description
Lady L	United States	The 80-foot (24.4 m) crab-fishing vessel sank 8 nautical miles (15 km; 9.2 mi) south of Gore Point (59°12′00″N 150°57′30″W) on the Kenai Peninsula on the south-central coast of Alaska. A United States Coast Guard helicopter rescued her crew of four.

=== 30 January ===
List of shipwrecks: 30 January 2001
Ship	State	Description
USS Barbel	United States Navy	The decommissioned Barbel-class submarine was sunk as a target in the Pacific Ocean off the coast of California.
Veter	United States	The 37-foot (11.3 m) longline and cod fishing vessel was beached and sank 200 yards (180 m) off Evans Point in Prince William Sound, Alaska, after striking a submerged object. The fishing vessel Hellion (United States) rescued her crew of three from the beach.

=== 31 January ===
List of shipwrecks: 31 January 2001
Ship	State	Description
USS John Paul Jones	United States Navy	The decommissioned Forrest Sherman-class destroyer was sunk as a target in the Pacific Ocean off the coast of California.

== February ==
=== 8 February ===
List of shipwrecks: 8 February 2001
Ship	State	Description
CFD	United States	The retired 100-foot (30.5 m) steel-hulled barge was scuttled as an artificial reef in the North Atlantic Ocean south of Long Island 2.5 nautical miles (4.6 km; 2.9 mi) off Moriches Inlet, New York.

=== 9 February ===
List of shipwrecks: 9 February 2001
Ship	State	Description
Ehime Maru	Japan	Ehime Maru and USS Greeneville collision: The training ship was sunk in the Pacific Ocean 17 nautical miles (31 km) off Hawaii, United States, by the submarine USS Greeneville (United States Navy), which surfaced underneath her, killing nine of her thirty-five crew. Survivors were rescued by United States Coast Guard RIBs.

=== 10 February ===
List of shipwrecks: 10 February 2001
Ship	State	Description
Going Concern	United Kingdom	The yacht was driven ashore at Eastbourne, East Sussex. She was refloated the next day with assistance from the Eastbourne Lifeboat and towed in to Eastbourne.

=== 14 February ===
List of shipwrecks: 14 February 2001
Ship	State	Description
USS Lynde McCormick	United States Navy	The decommissioned Charles F. Adams-class guided-missile destroyer was sunk as a target.

=== 18 February ===
List of shipwrecks: 18 February 1964
Ship	State	Description
Western Star	United States	The 177-gross ton, 65-foot (19.8 m) codfish trawler was destroyed in the North Pacific Ocean 19 nautical miles (35 km; 22 mi) southeast of Caton Island in the Fox Islands – part of the Aleutian Islands – by a fire that started in her engine room. All four people on board survived.

== March ==
=== 5 March ===
List of shipwrecks: 5 March 2001
Ship	State	Description
Amber Dawn	United States	The 91-foot (27.7 m) stern trawler sank in a storm with the loss of two lives in the Bering Sea approximately 6 nautical miles (11 km; 6.9 mi) north of Atka Island in the Aleutian Islands. The 267-foot (81.4 m) fish processor Katie Ann (United States) rescued her three survivors.

=== 6 March ===
List of shipwrecks: 6 March 2001
Ship	State	Description
Lady B	United States	The 17-gross ton, 34-foot (10.4 m) troller sank alongside the dock at Petersburg, Alaska. Her wreck later was refloated and scuttled in deep water.

=== 21 March ===
List of shipwrecks: 21 March 2001
Ship	State	Description
SLNS P-493	Sri Lanka Navy	Sri Lankan Civil War: The patrol boat was sunk by the Liberation Tigers of Tamil Eelam.
SLNS P-496	Sri Lanka Navy	Sri Lankan Civil War: The patrol boat was sunk by the Liberation Tigers of Tamil Eelam.

=== 27 March ===
List of shipwrecks: 27 March 2001
Ship	State	Description
CMA CGM Normandie	France	The container ship ran aground on a coral reef in the Strait of Malacca, 6 miles (9.7 km) from Singapore. The vessel was refloated on 22 April.

== April ==
=== 2 April ===
List of shipwrecks: 2 April 2001
Ship	State	Description
Arctic Rose	United States	The 92-foot (28.0 m) catcher processor sank with the loss of her entire crew of 15 in the Bering Sea near Zhemchug Canyon, approximately 200 nautical miles (370 km; 230 mi) northwest of Saint Paul Island. Her captain′s body was recovered at the time of the sinking, and over eight years later the bones of another crewman were accidentally recovered by the longline fishing vessel Blue Gadus (United States) on 12 September 2009 in 426 feet (130 m) of water 40 nautical miles (74 km; 46 mi) southeast of the location of the sinking. The bodies of the other 13 crew members were never found.

== May ==
=== 5 May ===
List of shipwrecks: 5 May 2001
Ship	State	Description
Iliamna	United States	The 29-foot (8.8 m) cod-fishing vessel sank in Chiniak Bay (57°42′N 152°20′W) on the coast of Kodiak Island about 12 nautical miles (22 km; 14 mi) south of Kodiak, Alaska. The fishing vessel Tina Marie (United States) rescued the only person aboard.

=== 11 May ===
List of shipwrecks: 11 May 2001
Ship	State	Description
Kristen	United States	The 49-foot (14.9 m) longline fishing vessel sank approximately 23 nautical miles (43 km; 26 mi) south of Cold Bay, Alaska, after striking an unidentified object. The fishing vessel Mr. Bill (United States) rescued her crew of four.

=== 15 May ===
List of shipwrecks: 15 May 1968
Ship	State	Description
Walyana	United States	The 28-foot (8.5 m) gillnetter capsized and sank in the Gulf of Alaska off the Copper River Delta after a rogue wave struck her. All three of her crew members made it to shore, where a United States Coast Guard helicopter rescued them.

=== 25 May ===
List of shipwrecks: 25 May 2001
Ship	State	Description
Lowlands Beilun	Singapore	The cargo ship ran aground on the Johor Shoal, Changi and was holed. She was refloated on 5 June, repaired and returned to service.

=== 30 May ===
List of shipwrecks: 30 May 2001
Ship	State	Description
Belize Queen	United States	The out of service 85-foot (26 m), 110-ton tugboat was sunk as an artificial reef in 112 feet (34 m) of water south of Destin, Florida (30°08′N 86°40′W) in the Gulf of Mexico.

=== 31 May ===
List of shipwrecks: 31 May 2001
Ship	State	Description
USS Reeves	United States Navy	USS Reeves being sunk The decommissioned Leahy-class guided-missile cruiser was sunk as a target in the Coral Sea off the coast of Queensland, Australia, at 26°26′53.0″S 155°24′27.0″E.

== June ==
=== 19 June ===
List of shipwrecks: 19 June 2001
Ship	State	Description
Margie Ann	United States	The retired 90-foot (27.4 m)tug was scuttled as an artificial reef in the North Atlantic Ocean off the coast of Delaware at 38°40.540′N 074°43.957′W.

=== 25 June ===
List of shipwrecks: 25 June 2001
Ship	State	Description
Raindancer	United States	The 34-foot (10.4 m) gillnet fishing vessel burned and sank in Cook Inlet on the south-central coast of Alaska. A nearby vessel rescued both people on board.

=== Unknown date ===
List of shipwrecks: Unknown date June 2001
Ship	State	Description
USS Miller	Turkish Navy	The decommissioned Knox-class frigate was sunk as a target after being sold to the Turkish Navy and cannibalized for spare parts.

== July ==
=== 6 July ===
List of shipwrecks: 6 July 2001
Ship	State	Description
Exciter	United States	The 40-foot (12.2 m) gillnet fishing vessel was wrecked on the north coast of the Alaska Peninsula approximately 35 nautical miles (65 km; 40 mi) northeast of Port Moller (55°59′30″N 160°34′30″W), Alaska. The fishing vessel Finner (United States) and a United States Coast Guard helicopter rescued her crew of two.
Houri	United States	The 34-foot (10.4 m) gillnet fishing vessel burned and sank in Cook Inlet on the south-central coast of Alaska. The fishing vessel Proud Mary (United States) rescued the only person on board.

=== 10 July ===
List of shipwrecks: 10 July 2001
Ship	State	Description
USS La Moure County	United States Navy	La Moure County being sunk as a target The decommissioned Newport-class tank landing ship was sunk as a target in the Pacific Ocean about 130 nmi (240 km; 150 mi) west of Valparaíso, Chile, at 32°49′08″S 74°17′09″W, during UNITAS 2001.

=== 12 July ===
List of shipwrecks: 12 July 2001
Ship	State	Description
Sea	flag unknown	The cruise ship sank near the coast of South Africa during a heavy winter storm. She was on her way to Alang, India for scrapping.

=== 16 July ===
List of shipwrecks: 16 July 2001
Ship	State	Description
Kelvin	Norway	The cargo ship capsized at Mo i Rana, Norway.

=== 22 July ===
List of shipwrecks: 22 July 2001
Ship	State	Description
Dry Heat	United States	The 32-foot (9.8 m) pleasure craft burned and sank in 1,200 feet (370 m) of water off Streets Island (55°28′40″N 132°08′15″W) in Southeast Alaska, 10 nautical miles (19 km; 12 mi) west of Ketchikan, Alaska. The vessels Sheltered Seas and Show Girl (both United States) rescued all nine people – four adults and five children – aboard.

=== 26 July ===
List of shipwrecks: 26 July 2001
Ship	State	Description
Excursion	United States	The 70-foot (21.3 m) fish tender burned and sank in Bristol Bay near Port Moller (55°59′30″N 160°34′30″W), Alaska, 80 nautical miles (150 km; 92 mi) northeast of Cold Bay, Alaska. Her crew of four abandoned ship in a life raft and was rescued by a United States Coast Guard helicopter.
Sun 11	Bahamas	The cruise liner sank off Cape St. Francis, South Africa while under tow to India for scrapping.
Vanguard	United States	The 65-foot (19.8 m) fishing vessel – a seiner – sank in 200 feet (61 m) of water less than two minutes after striking an iceberg 0.5 nautical miles (0.93 km) from Glacier Island (60°53′N 147°11′W) outside Columbia Bay, 35 nautical miles (65 km) southwest of Valdez, Alaska. Wearing survival suits, her three-man crew escaped in a life raft that deployed and were rescued by nearby vessels.

=== 27 July ===
List of shipwrecks: 27 July 2001
Ship	State	Description
Ben B	United States	The 86-foot (26.2 m) fish tender burned and sank in Snow Passage (56.277500°N 132.949722°W) near Shrubby Island (56°13′N 132°58′W) in Southeast Alaska 30 nautical miles (56 km; 35 mi) southwest of Wrangell, Alaska. Her crew of two abandoned ship in a life raft and was rescued by the fishing vessel Middleton (United States).

== August ==
=== 4 August ===
List of shipwrecks: 4 August 2001
Ship	State	Description
Windy Bay	United States	The 166-foot (50.6 m) fish tender struck Olsen Rock off the coast of Alaska while her operator was off the bridge and sank in 1,000 feet (300 m) of water in Prince William Sound near Olsen Island. Nearby vessels rescued all five members of her crew.

=== 6 August ===
List of shipwrecks: 6 August 2001
Ship	State	Description
Rhonda Renee	United States	The 34-foot (10.4 m) bowpicker struck a rock off Knowles Head (60°41′00″N 146°37′30″W) in Prince William Sound on the south-central coast of Alaska and began to leak. Her hull was patched, but she sank on the way to Homer, Alaska, after the patch failed.

=== 11 August ===
List of shipwrecks: 11 August 2001
Ship	State	Description
Windoc	Canada	The bulk carrier was damaged beyond economic repair in the Welland Canal at Allanburg, Ontario, Canada, when a lifting bridge was prematurely lowered while the vessel was passing through.

=== 16 August ===
List of shipwrecks: 16 August 2001
Ship	State	Description
Helen Marie	United States	The 42-foot (12.8 m) seiner was destroyed by an engine room fire in Lazy Bay (56°56′40″N 154°10′00″W) at Akhiok on the southern end of Kodiak Island in Alaska's Kodiak Archipelago. Her crew of three abandoned ship in a skiff. Her melted hull was towed to the beach near Akhiok.

=== 19 August ===
List of shipwrecks: 19 August 2001
Ship	State	Description
Sea Gull	United States	The 30-foot (9.1 m) fishing vessel was swamped and capsized while hauling her nets at Point Marsden (58°03′30″N 134°48′25″W) near Hawk Inlet on Admiralty Island in the Alexander Archipelago in Southeast Alaska. The fishing vessel Steadfast (United States) rescued her entire crew of six.

=== 24 August ===
List of shipwrecks: 24 August 2001
Ship	State	Description
Revenge II	United States	After a large wave broke over her stern, the 86-foot (26.2 m) fish tender capsized and sank in the Gulf of Alaska 4.15 nautical miles (7.69 km; 4.78 mi) west by southwest of Cape Ommaney (56°10′00″N 134°40′20″W) in Southeast Alaska and approximately 70 nautical miles (130 km; 81 mi) south of Sitka, Alaska. Her two-man crew, Captain Mark Wade and the unidentified crewman, Chuk Blessum, abandoned ship in survival suits and rescued by the fishing vessel Monarch (United States).

=== 25 August ===
List of shipwrecks: 25 August 2001
Ship	State	Description
Heritage	United States	The 49-foot (14.9 m) seiner was wrecked in Hawk Inlet (58°07′40″N 134°45′15″W) in Southeast Alaska after her captain went into diabetic shock while at her wheel. He died, but the other four members of her crew and a dog abandoned ship in a skiff and were rescued by the cruise ship Spirit of Endeavour (United States).

=== 27 August ===
List of shipwrecks: 27 August 2001
Ship	State	Description
Evelyn S	United States	The 70-foot (21.3 m) fish tender sank in the Gulf of Alaska 52 nautical miles (96 km; 60 mi) south of Yakutat, Alaska. The United States Coast Guard and the fishing vessel Gandil (United States) rescued her crew of three.

=== 28 August ===
List of shipwrecks: 28 August 2001
Ship	State	Description
"Sarfaq"	New Zealand	The 121.4-foot (37.0 m) fishing vessel was scuttled 15 miles south southwest of Cape Palliser in 1,700-metre (5,600 ft) of water (41°48′S 175°00′E).

=== Unknown date ===
List of shipwrecks: Unknown date August 2001
Ship	State	Description
ARM Riva Palacio	Mexican Navy	The decommissioned Admirable-class minesweeper was sunk in the Gulf of Mexico off Veracruz, Mexico, as an artificial reef.

== September ==
=== 1 September ===
List of shipwrecks: 1 September 2001
Ship	State	Description
Joycelyn	United States	The 50-foot (15.2 m) salmon seiner capsized near Warren Island in the Alexander Archipelago in Southeast Alaska, 75 nautical miles (139 km; 86 mi) northwest of Ketchikan, Alaska. The cutter USCGC Anacapa ( United States Coast Guard) rescued her crew of four.

=== 5 September ===
List of shipwrecks: 5 September 2001
Ship	State	Description
Mercury	United States	While towing a crane barge, the 60-foot (18.3 m) tug was flooded by high seas and abandoned in Bristol Bay off the coast of Alaska 26 nautical miles (48 km; 30 mi) southwest of the Ugashik River. Her crew cut the crane barge loose before abandoning ship. A United States Coast Guard helicopter rescued her crew of two.

=== 12 September ===
List of shipwrecks: 12 September 2001
Ship	State	Description
Themistoklis	Hellenic Navy	The decommissioned Gearing-class destroyer was sunk as a target.

=== 20 September ===
List of shipwrecks: 20 September 2001
Ship	State	Description
Heritage Hull	United States Coast Guard	The 120-foot (36.6 m) prototype cutter hull – rejected by the United States Coast Guard and still lacking engines and fuel tanks – was scuttled as an artificial reef in the North Atlantic Ocean about 9 nautical miles (17 km; 10 mi) off Cape May, New Jersey, at the north end of Cape May Reef in 65 feet (20 m) of water at 38°51.810′N 074°40.590′W. It took her 3 hours 15 minutes to sink.

== October ==
=== 9 October ===
List of shipwrecks: 9 October 2001
Ship	State	Description
Ash	Saint Vincent and the Grenadines	The cargo ship collided with Dutch Aquamarine (Netherlands) in the English Channel and sank with the loss of one of her six crew.
Miaoulis	Hellenic Navy	The decommissioned Allen M. Sumner-class destroyer was sunk as a target.
Two Friends	United States	The retired 70-foot (21.3 m) fishing trawler was scuttled as an artificial reef in the North Atlantic Ocean south of Long Island 2.5 nautical miles (4.6 km; 2.9 mi) off Moriches Inlet, New York.
Wave Dancer	Belize	The dive support vessel sank at Independence in a hurricane with the loss of twenty of the twenty-eight people on board.

=== 11 October ===
List of shipwrecks: 11 October 2001
Ship	State	Description
Pacific	United States	The 40-foot (12.2 m) longline cod-fishing vessel was wrecked near Priest Rock in Iliuliuk Bay (53°54′N 166°30′W) on the coast of Unalaska Island in the Aleutian Islands after her helmsman fell asleep at the wheel. Her crew of three survived.

=== 13 October ===
List of shipwrecks: 13 October 2001
Ship	State	Description
ROCS Yuen Yang	Republic of China Navy	The decommissioned Allen M. Sumner-class guided-missile destroyer was sunk as a target.

=== 16 October ===
List of shipwrecks: 16 October 2001
Ship	State	Description
USS Guam	United States Navy	The decommissioned Iwo Jima-class amphibious assault ship was sunk as a target by aircraft from the aircraft carrier USS John F. Kennedy (United States Navy) in the Atlantic Ocean off Virginia at 031°14′22″N 071°16′35″W.

=== 19 October ===
List of shipwrecks: 19 October 2001
Ship	State	Description
"SIEV X"	Indonesia	The Suspected Illegal Entry Vessel sank en route between Bandar Lampung and Australia. Three hundred and fifty-three people were drowned.

=== 20 October ===
List of shipwrecks: 20 October 2001
Ship	State	Description
HMCS Cape Breton	Canadian Forces Maritime Command	The decommissioned Cape-class maintenance ship was sunk as an artificial reef near Snake Island, east of Nanaimo, British Columbia, Canada.

=== 23 October ===
List of shipwrecks: 23 October 2001
Ship	State	Description
J. W. Westcott II	United States	The mail boat capsized and sank in the Detroit River while servicing the tanker Sidsel Knutsen. Two people (the captain and one of the crew members) lost their lives while the other two were saved. The boat was later refloated and returned to service.

=== 28 October ===
List of shipwrecks: 28 October 2001
Ship	State	Description
Ocean Sunrise	United States	The 42-foot (12.8 m) shrimp-fishing vessel sank in high seas in Cholmondeley Sound (55°17′N 132°04′W) in Southeast Alaska, 19 nautical miles (35 km; 22 mi) west of Ketchikan, Alaska. A man on board died; the only other person aboard – his wife – survived.

=== 30 October ===
List of shipwrecks: 30 October 2001
Ship	State	Description
Brooklyn	United States	The retired 86-foot (26.2 m) tug was scuttled as an artificial reef in the North Atlantic Ocean 2 nautical miles (3.7 km; 2.3 mi) off Mantoloking, New Jersey, at 40°03.390′N 073°59.550′W.
E-13	United States	The retired 178-foot (54.3 m) barge was scuttled as an artificial reef in the North Atlantic Ocean 2 nautical miles (3.7 km; 2.3 mi) off Mantoloking, New Jersey, at 40°03.840′N 073°59.580′W.

=== 31 October ===
List of shipwrecks: 31 October 2001
Ship	State	Description
Lewis F. Boyer	United States	The retired 95-foot (29 m) tug was scuttled as an artificial reef in the North Atlantic Ocean 3.6 nautical miles (6.7 km; 4.1 mi) off Sea Girt, New Jersey, in 75 feet (23 m) of water at 40°08.179′N 073°55.824′W.

== November ==
=== 18 November ===
List of shipwrecks: 24 November 2001
Ship	State	Description
Samra	UAE	An Iraqi ship (under the UAE flag), which was smuggling tanks of oil hidden under bags of grain in spite of a U.S/international oil embargo on Iraq sank after it was boarded by the United States Navy from USS Peterson as part of Operation Northern-Southern Watch. The cause of the sinking is unknown. Eight of Peterson's crew boarded Samra. When Samra sank, ten of its Iraqi crew, and six of the eight U.S personnel were saved, while one Iraqi, and two U.S personnel perished.

=== 24 November ===
List of shipwrecks: 24 November 2001
Ship	State	Description
HMAS Perth	Royal Australian Navy	The decommissioned Perth-class guided-missile destroyer was scuttled in the Indian Ocean off Albany, Western Australia, to serve as a recreational dive site.

=== 26 November ===
List of shipwrecks: 26 November 2001
Ship	State	Description
Heng Shan	China	The bulk carrier ran aground in the Black Sea at Karadeniz Eregli, Turkey. She was refloated several months later.

== December ==
=== 11 December ===
List of shipwrecks: 11 December 2001
Ship	State	Description
Nesika	United States	The fishing vessel was reported lost off Alaska with the loss of four lives.

=== 22 December ===
List of shipwrecks: 22 December 2001
Ship	State	Description
Christopher	Cyprus	The cargo ship foundered in the Atlantic Ocean off Graciosa Island, Azores with the loss of all twenty-seven crew.
Zhangyu No. 3705	Korean People's Navy	Battle of Amami-Ōshima: The spy ship/naval trawler was shelled and sunk in the East China Sea by Kirishima, Amani and Inasa (all Japan Coast Guard). 15 crewmen killed. The vessel was later raised.

== Unknown ==
List of shipwrecks: Unknown 2001
Ship	State	Description
SLNS P-411	Sri Lanka Navy	Sri Lankan Civil War: The patrol boat was sunk by the Liberation Tigers of Tamil Eelam sometime in 2001.
