= Knut (disambiguation) =

Knut, and variants, is a Scandinavian given name.

Knut may also refer to:

- Knut (band), a technical sludge metal band
- Knut (polar bear) (2006–2011)
- Knut, a currency in the fictional universe of Harry Potter
- Knut, an ogre character in Winx Club
- KNUT, a radio station in Guam
- Kenya National Union of Teachers
- List of storms named Knut

== See also ==
- Canute (disambiguation)
- Knout, a Russian whip
- Knute Township, Polk County, Minnesota, U.S.
- Knuth, a surname of Nordic origin
- Kyiv National University of Trade and Economics (KNUTE)
