= Knutson =

Knutson is a Norwegian surname that may refer to

- Allen Knutson, American mathematician
- Björn Knutson (born 1938), Swedish speedway rider
- Brian Knutson, American psychologist and neuroscientist
- Byron Knutson (born 1929), American politician
- Chris Knutson, American stand-up comedian
- Coya Knutson (1912–1996), American politician
- Dagny Knutson (born 1992), American swimmer of Norwegian heritage
- Dana Knutson, American artist
- David Knutson (born 1959), American politician, lawyer, and judge
- Delrae Knutson, American actress
- Elmer Knutson (1914–2001), Canadian businessman, activist and fringe politician
- Gabriela Knutson (born 1997), Czech tennis player
- Gar Knutson (born 1956), Canadian lawyer and politician
- Gene Knutson (1932–2008), American football player
- Greta Knutson (1899–1983), Swedish modernist visual artist, art critic, short story writer and poet
- Harold Knutson (1880–1953), Norwegian-American politician and journalist
- Heather A. Knutson, American astrophysicist
- Howard A. Knutson (1926-2006), American lawyer and politician
- J. Knutson, Canadian folk singer-songwriter
- Kristen L Knutson, neurologist studying sleep
- Lars Knutson Liestøl (1839–1912), Norwegian politician
- Milo Knutson (1917–1981), American politician
- Olga Cecilia Knutson (1888–1969), Swedish-American animal trainer and actress
- Oscar Knutson (1899–1981), American lawyer and judge
- Paul Knutson, 14th-century Norwegian law officer
- Steve Knutson (born 1951), American football player
- Terry Teene (born Knutson, 1942–2012), American musician, vocalist, songwriter, and entertainer
- Thomas Knutson, American climate scientist
- Trigg H. Knutson (1879-1952), American politician
- Venke Knutson (born 1978), Norwegian singer
- Zak Knutson (born 1974), American film director, producer, writer, and actor

== See also ==
- Knutsen
- Knutsson
