= Knutsen =

Knutsen is a Norwegian surname. Its origin was as a patronymic name (-sen/-søn/-son/-zen) derived from the first name Knut. Notable people with the surname include:

- Arvid Knutsen (1944–2009), Norwegian footballer and later coach
- Espen Knutsen (born 1972), Norwegian ice hockey player
- Finn Knutsen (1932–2021), Norwegian politician
- Geir Knutsen (born 1959), Norwegian politician for the Labour Party
- Guro Knutsen (born 1985), Norwegian football player
- Konrad B. Knutsen (1925–2012), Norwegian civil servant
- Lars Knutsen (1884–1963), Norwegian shipowner, founder of Lars Knutsen and Sons Ltd, a ship chandler business in Wales
- Marie Knutsen (born 1982), Norwegian football midfielder
- Morten Knutsen (born 1977), Norwegian football coach and former player
- Nelly Bell Knutsen (1905–1991), Norwegian politician for the Christian Democratic Party
- Olav Martinus Knutsen Steinnes (1886–1961), Norwegian Minister of Education and Church Affairs in 1928
- Paul Knutsen Barstad Sandvik (1847–1936), Norwegian educator
- Peter Tessem and Paul Knutsen, Norwegian explorers who went with Roald Amundsen on his 1918 Arctic expedition
- Tormod Knutsen (1932–2021), Norwegian Nordic combined athlete
- Tove Karoline Knutsen (born 1951), Norwegian politician for the Labour Party
- Venke Knutson (born 1978), Norwegian pop artist

== See also ==
- Knutsen & Ludvigsen, Norwegian singing duo having written and performed various songs for children
- Knutsen & Ludvigsens Beste, greatest hits album by Knutsen & Ludvigsen, covering 22 songs from 1970 to 1988
- Knutsen & Ludvigsens Ver'ste', compilation album by Knutsen & Ludvigsen, covering 20 songs from 1970 to 1997
- MT Sidsel Knutsen, Norwegian oil tanker built in 1993
- Knudsen (disambiguation)
- Knutsen Lake, a lake in Minnesota
