= Knutsson =

Knutsson is a Nordic, mostly Swedish, surname.

== Geographical distribution ==
As of 2014, 93.1% of all known bearers of the surname Knutsson were residents of Sweden, 2.7% of Denmark, 1.7% of Norway and 1.1% of the United States.

In Sweden, the frequency of the surname was higher than national average in the following counties:

1. Blekinge (1:606)
2. Jönköping (1:817)
3. Kalmar (1:953)
4. Skåne (1:1,010)
5. Östergötland (1:1,011)
6. Kronoberg (1:1,013)
7. Västra Götaland (1:1,308)
8. Värmland (1:1,401)
9. Halland (1:1,442)

== People ==
- Aad Knutsson Gjelle (1768–1840), Norwegian cartographer
- Alv Knutsson (c. 1420–1496), Norwegian nobleman
- Anders Knutsson Ångström (1888–1981), Swedish physicist and meteorologist
- Atli Knútsson (born 1975), Icelandic football goalkeeper
- Charles VIII of Sweden (Karl Knutsson, 1409–1470), king of Sweden and Norway
- Eric X of Sweden (Erik Knutsson, c. 1180–1216), King of Sweden
- Filippa Knutsson (born 1965), Swedish fashion designer
- Gösta Knutsson (1908–1973), Swedish radio producer and writer
- Gunilla Knutsson (1940–2025), Swedish model, actress and author
- Inger Knutsson (born 1955), Swedish Olympic middle-distance runner
- Helene Hellmark Knutsson (born 1969), Swedish politician
- Holmger Knutsson (1210s–1248), Swedish nobleman and claimant to the Swedish throne
- Knut Knutsson Steintjønndalen (1887–1969), Norwegian Hardanger fiddle maker
- Magnus Knutsson (born 1963), Swedish cyclist
- Nalle Knutsson (1943–2012), Swedish musical artist, actor, party planner and clothing designer
- Svantepolk of Viby (Svantepolk Knutsson, died 1310), Scandinavian magnate
- Svein Knutsson (c. 1016–1035), son of Cnut the Great, king of Denmark, Norway, and England
- Thomas Knutsson (born 1958), Swedish Olympic shooter
- Torkel Knutsson (died 1306), constable, privy council, and virtual ruler of Sweden
- Viktor Knutsson (1886–1969), Swedish sports shooter

== See also ==
- Knutsen
- Knutson
- 8534 Knutsson, a minor planet
