= Knudsen =

Knudsen may refer to:

== People ==
Knudsen is a surname of Danish origin, derived from the personal name Knud (Canute) and literally meaning "Knud's son." Notable people with the surname include:

- Aase Schibsted Knudsen (born 1954), Norwegian academic and writer
- Anne Knudsen (1948–2022), Danish anthropologist, editor, journalist and researcher
- Anthony Carl Knudsen (1874–1931), American businessman and politician
- Chilton R. Knudsen (born 1946), American Episcopal bishop
- Gitte Moos Knudsen, Danish neurobiologist and neurologist
- Gunnar Knudsen (1848–1928), Prime Minister of Norway 1908–1910 and 1913–1920
- Hans Knudsen (1886–1971), German writer
- Jens Martin Knudsen (1930–2005), Danish astrophysicist
- Jens Martin Knudsen (footballer) (born 1967), Faroese goalkeeper
- Jens Nygaard Knudsen (1942–2020), Danish toy designer
- Jesper Knudsen (badminton) (born 1960), Danish player
- Karen Knudsen, American oncology researcher
- Keith Knudsen (1948–2005), American musician, member of The Doobie Brothers
- Kerry Knudsen (born 1950), American lichenologist
- Knud Knudsen (linguist) (1812–1895), Norwegian linguist
- Knut Knudsen, (born 1950), retired Norwegian road and track cyclist.
- Konrad Knudsen (1890–1959), Norwegian painter, journalist, and parliamentarian
- Lars Knudsen (born 1962), Danish researcher in cryptography
- Lina Almind Knudsen (born 1985), Danish curler
- Lisbeth Knudsen (born 1953), Danish newspaper editor and businesswoman
- Martin Knudsen (1871–1949), Danish physicist
- Matt Knudsen (born 1974), American actor, comedian and writer
- Morten Knudsen, (born 1995) Danish footballer
- Per Holm Knudsen (contemporary), Danish author
- Eugene Peter Knudsen (1915–1981), American farmer and politician
- Semon "Bunkie" Knudsen (1912–1998), American automobile industry executive
- Sidse Babett Knudsen (born 1968), Danish actress
- Tord Øverland Knudsen (born 1982), Norwegian musician
- Ulrik Knudsen (born 1978), Danish politician
- Valdemar Knudsen (1819–1898), Norwegian-American sugar planter on Hawaii, entrepreneur
- Vern Oliver Knudsen, (1893–1974), American acoustical physicist
- William S. Knudsen (1879–1948), Danish American automobile industry executive, US Army General

== Other uses ==
- Knudsen, a brand of dairy products, is currently owned by Lactalis
- R.W. Knudsen Family, a brand of natural bottled juices
- Knudsen gas, scientific model for gases
- Knudsen number, dimensionless number
- Knudsen layer, layer between liquid and vapour
- Morrison–Knudsen, was an American civil engineering and construction company active in the 20th century.

== See also ==
- Knutsen
