= Knutsdotter =

Knutsdotter ('daughter of Knut') is a Scandinavian name. People with the name include:

- Ingegerd Knutsdotter (1356–1412, a Swedish nun and noble
- Ingegerd Knutsdatter (born c. 1080), daughter of King Canute IV of Denmark

== See also ==
- Knut, a Scandinavian given name
