= Canute (disambiguation) =

Canute or Cnut (c. 990 – 1035) was a European king.

Canute may also refer to:

- Canute (given name), including a list of people with the name
- Canute, Oklahoma, United States

== See also ==
- Knut (disambiguation)
