= Broder Knudtzon =

Norwegian merchant, politician and patron

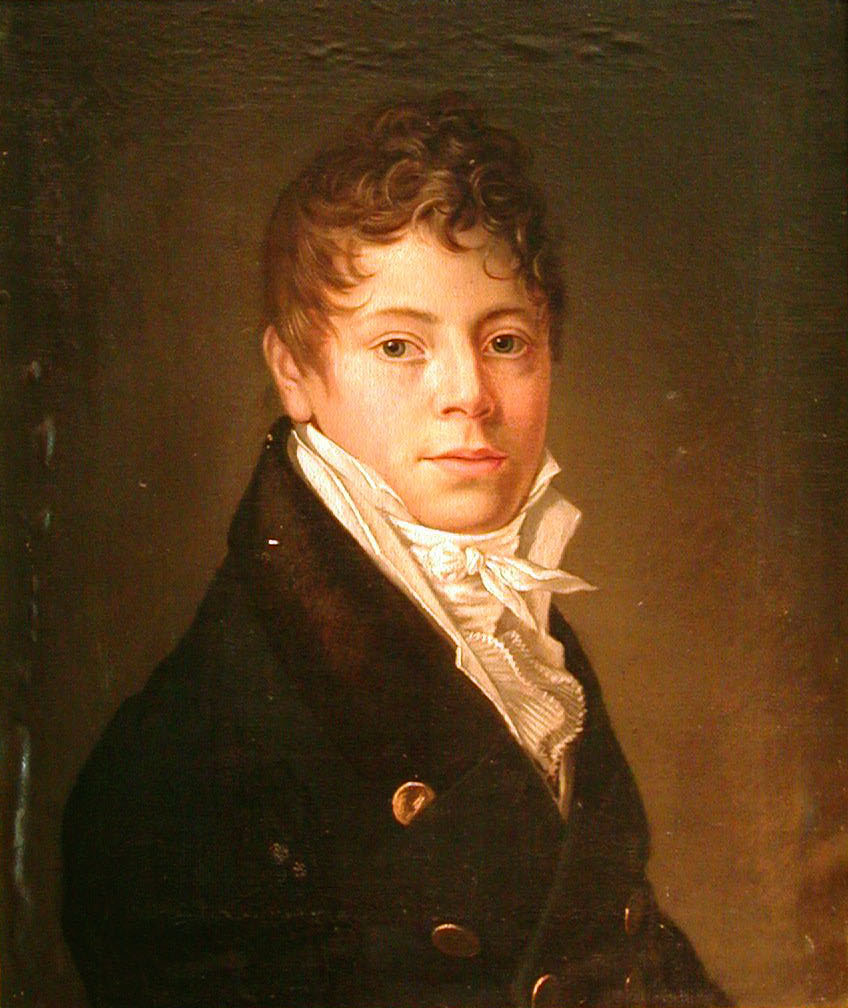
Broder Knudtzon

Broder Lysholm Knudtzon (5 October 1788 – 20 March 1864) was a Norwegian merchant, politician and benefactor. Born into one of Trondheim's wealthiest mercantile families, he travelled to England where he developed a great admiration of English language and literature. Despite his commercial background he was more drawn towards the fields of politics, culture and art. He nevertheless administrated his father's family firm, acting as foreign correspondent with little interest in the everyday business. In England he befriended Lord Byron and came under the influence of the English national liberal movement. He bequeathed his entire library and several artworks to the Royal Norwegian Society of Sciences and Letters.

== Early years ==
Knudtzon was born in Trondheim in Sør-Trøndelag; he was the sixth and youngest child of Hans Carl Knudtzon (1751–1823), a merchant and burgomaster, and Karen Knudtzon (née Müller, 1752–1818). Knudtzon's father was of German origin and had moved to Norway to further his career as a merchant. His firm was flourishing financially, and the Knudtzon family became a rallying point for Trondheim's artists and authors. Having spent his childhood in Trondheim, Broder Knudtzon moved to Flensburg, Germany in 1796 to live in the house of his father's uncle. Upon his confirmation, Knudtzon travelled back to Trondheim where he was apprenticed to his father. He subsequently travelled around in France in search of a mercantile education; in Paris he met the Danish poet and playwright Adam Oehlenschläger. After a brief visit to his sister in Nantes, he relocated to England, where he came in contact with poet Lord Byron and other leading figures in the national liberal movement. During his stay in England, he acquired a great fondness and knowledge of the English language, literature and culture. In a later trip to Italy he met the Danish-Icelandic sculptor Bertel Thorvaldsen, who made portrait busts of him and other members of his family.

== Mercantile and political engagement ==
In the spring of 1814, Broder and his brother Jørgen assisted Carsten Anker in his endeavour to gain English supporters of an independent Norway. As a member of the Storting's deputation to Sweden, Knudtzon travelled with his father to Stockholm in the autumn of the same year. On his return from Stockholm, he became foreign correspondent of his father's firm Hans Knudtzon & Co, which he owned together with his brother Christian and his brother-in-law Lorentz Johannsen. He maintained that his own duties in the firm's office were a displeasure, and was once quoted as saying: "Business I hate, and for reading there is not leisure".

A supplementary member of the Storting, he met in the parliament once, acting as secretary for the constitution committee. During 1839–57, he was a member of the supervisory board of Norges Bank. He became a member of the Royal Norwegian Society of Sciences and Letters in 1821, and was its secretary from 1825 to 1831. Having a profound wish to spread erudition in Norway, he used his acquaintances in England to supply the society with enlightenment books and journals. Knudtzon eventually bequeathed his entire book collection and five of Thorvaldsen's sculptures to the society, with the condition that they not move to Christiania.

== Death and legacy ==
Knudtzon died unmarried on 20 March 1864 in Trondheim. He was buried in Vår Frue Church, where he also had been christened. Prior to his death, he had burned all his letters and notes, including his correspondences with Lord Byron. Little remains therefore of his written production, aside from a few translations and periodical articles. A biographer once wrote of him:

Mr. Knudtzon is a banker of eminence at Trondheim. He resided some years in England; hence, to the hospitable kindness of a native of the north and the acquirements of a literary man he unites the polish and refinement of an English gentleman.

== Works cited ==
- Aase, Monica. "En europeer i Trondheim – Broder Lysholm Knudtzon og hans bibliotek." Til opplysning: Universitetsbiblioteket i Trondheim 1768–1993. Ed. Harald Nissen and Monica Aase. Trondheim: Tapir Forlag, 1993. 132–137. ISBN 82-519-1467-1. Print.
- Bratberg, Terje. "Knudtzon." Trondheim byleksikon. Ed. Jon Gunnar Arntzen. Trondheim: Kunnskapsforlaget, 1996. 296. ISBN 82-573-0642-8. Print.
- –––. "Lorentz Johannsen." Norsk biografisk leksikon. Ed. Knut Helle. Vol. 5. Oslo: Kunnskapsforlaget, 2002. Web. 16 Dec. 2011.
- Bull, Ida. "Broder Knudtzon." Norsk biografisk leksikon. Ed. Knut Helle. Vol. 5. Oslo: Kunnskapsforlaget, 2002. Web. 13 Dec. 2011.
- –––. "Hans Carl Knudtzon." Norsk biografisk leksikon. Ed. Knut Helle. Vol. 5. Oslo: Kunnskapsforlaget, 2002. Web. 13 Dec. 2011.
- Nielsen, Lauritz. "Ældre dansk litteratur i Norge." Nordisk tidskrift för bok- och biblioteksväsen 10 (1923): 155–66. Web. 19 Dec. 2011.
