= Mail boat =

Boat used for the delivery of mail

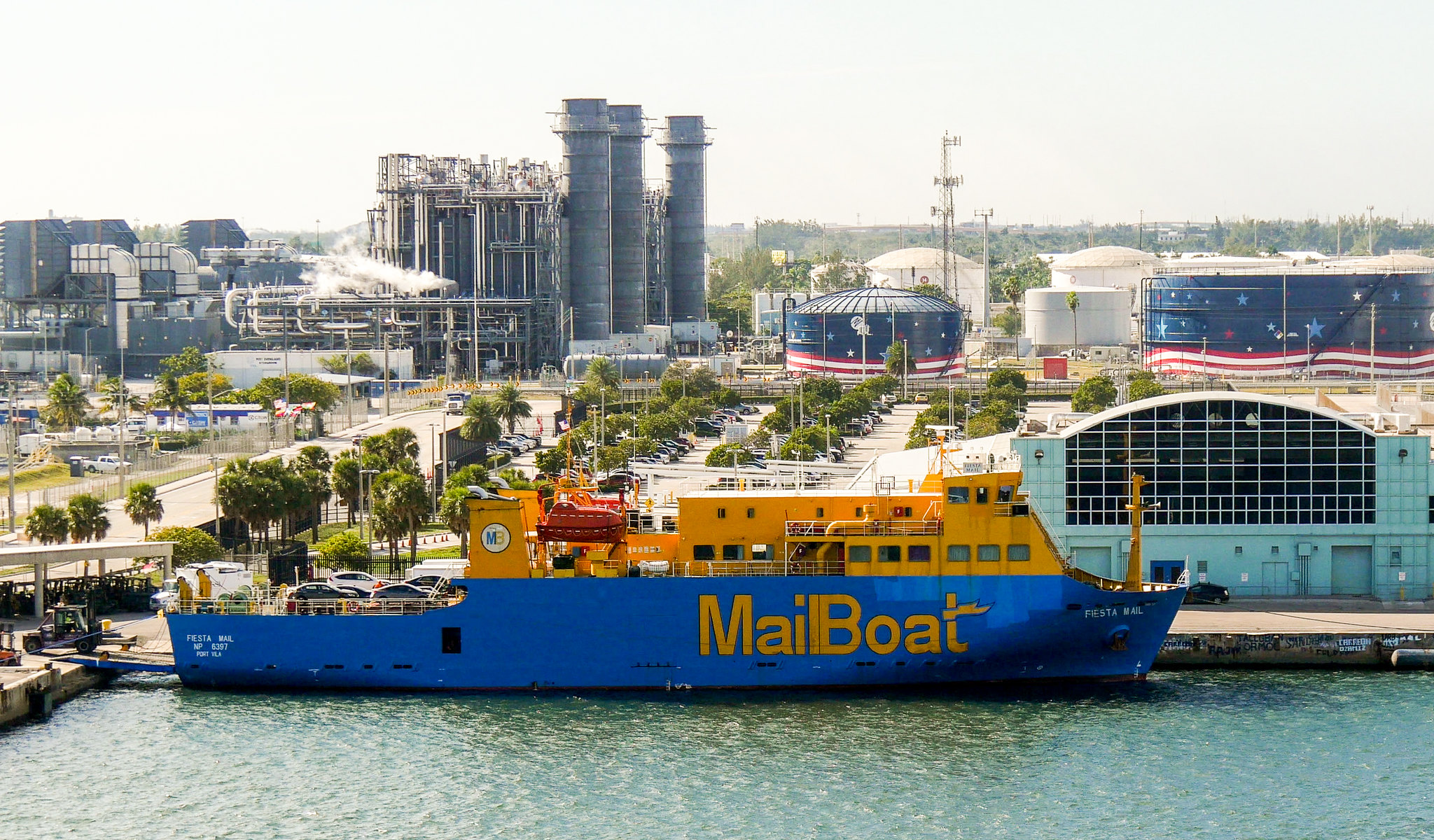
Large modern day mail boat

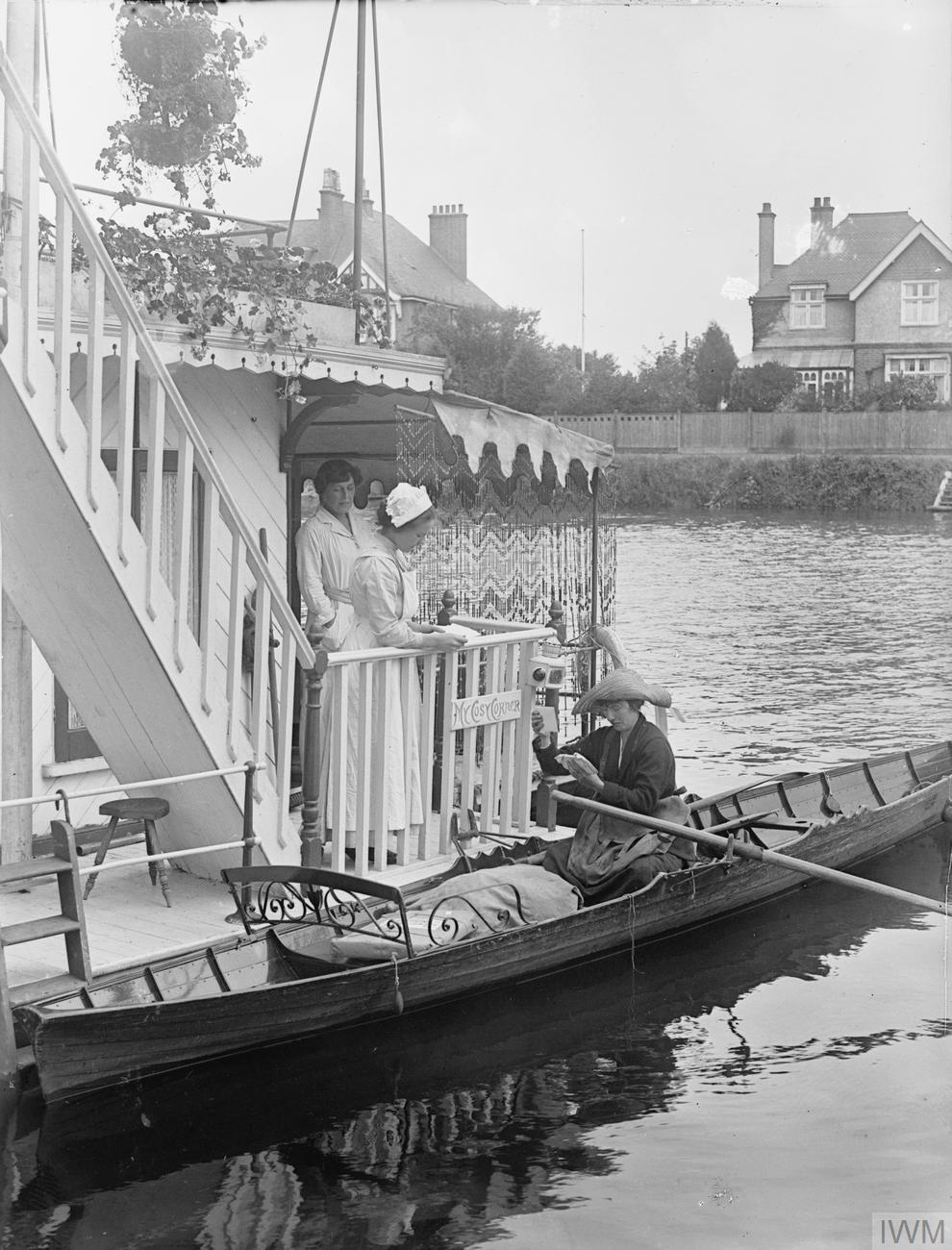
A letter carrier delivering mail by boat to a houseboat during World War I

Mail boats or postal boats are a boat or ship used for the delivery of mail, and sometimes transportation of goods, people and vehicles, in communities where bodies of water commonly separate settlements, towns or cities, often where bridges are not available. They are also used where water transport is more efficient or cost effective, or other means of transport to the destination is impractical, even when roads or flights may be another option.

Nearly any type or size of boat or ship may be used as a mail boat or ship. The size of the boat may be determined by the needs of the communities it serves, or by environmental factors which may influence the boats design for protection of crew, passengers, and items for transport, or requiring lesser draft for shallower waters.

Sometimes a mail jumper jumps off the boat to exchange inbound and outbound mail while the mail boat continues slow movement rather than docking.

== Modern day use ==
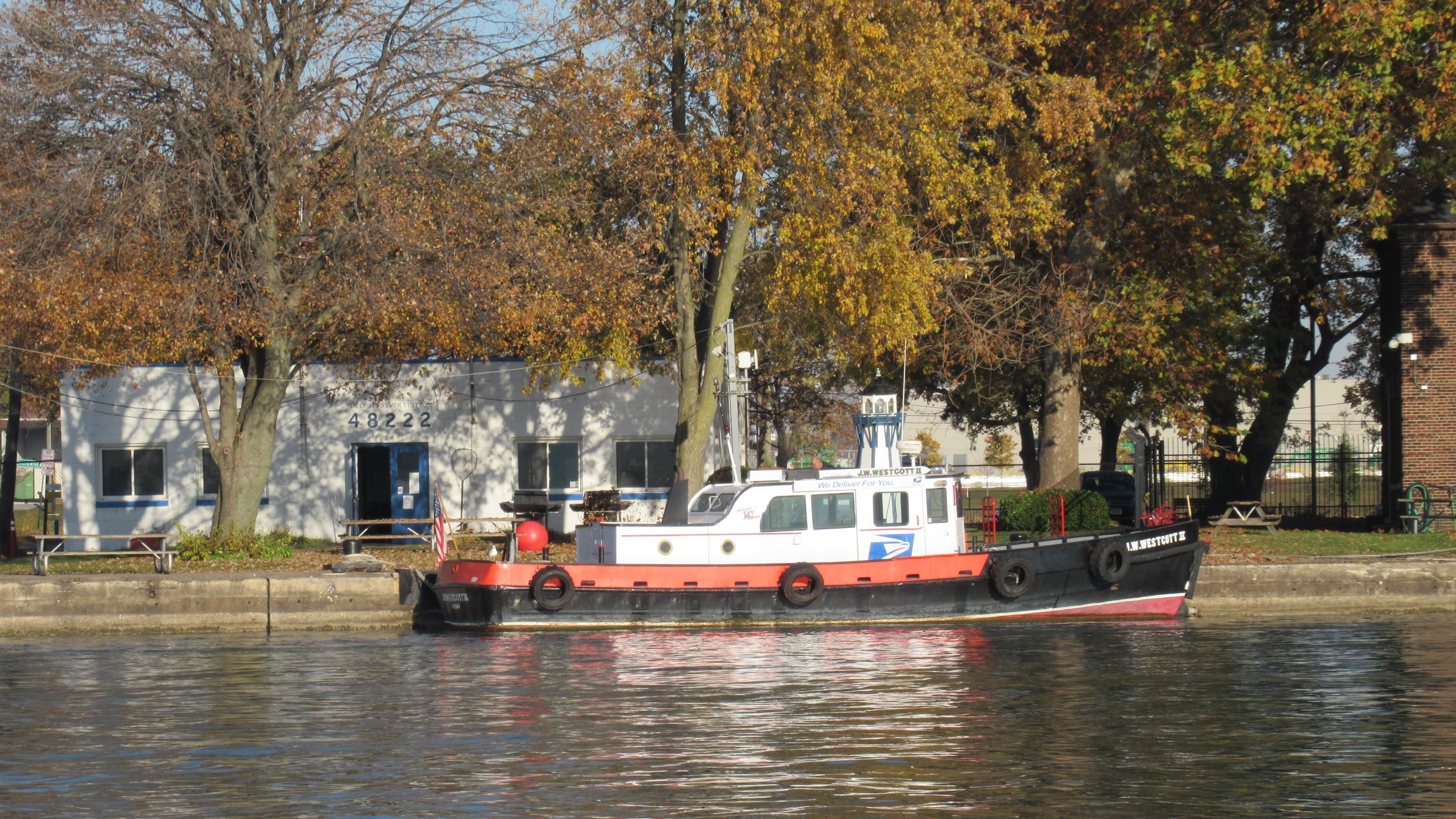
The J. W. Westcott II, a United States Postal Service mail boat serving the crews of lake freighters passing Detroit

Mail boats are still in use for some communities and may become tourist attractions, or a means of slow travel while still serving the purpose of mail transit.

The inter-island commerce of some countries depend heavily on mail boat services. In these areas the mail boat may be large enough to carry a number of vehicles including tractor-trailers.

== See also ==
- Dispatch boat
- Packet boat
- Royal Mail Ship, ships authorized by the British Royal Mail to courier mail across bodies of water, from one nautical postal depot to another
