= Catharina Lysholm =

Norwegian businesswoman and ship-owner

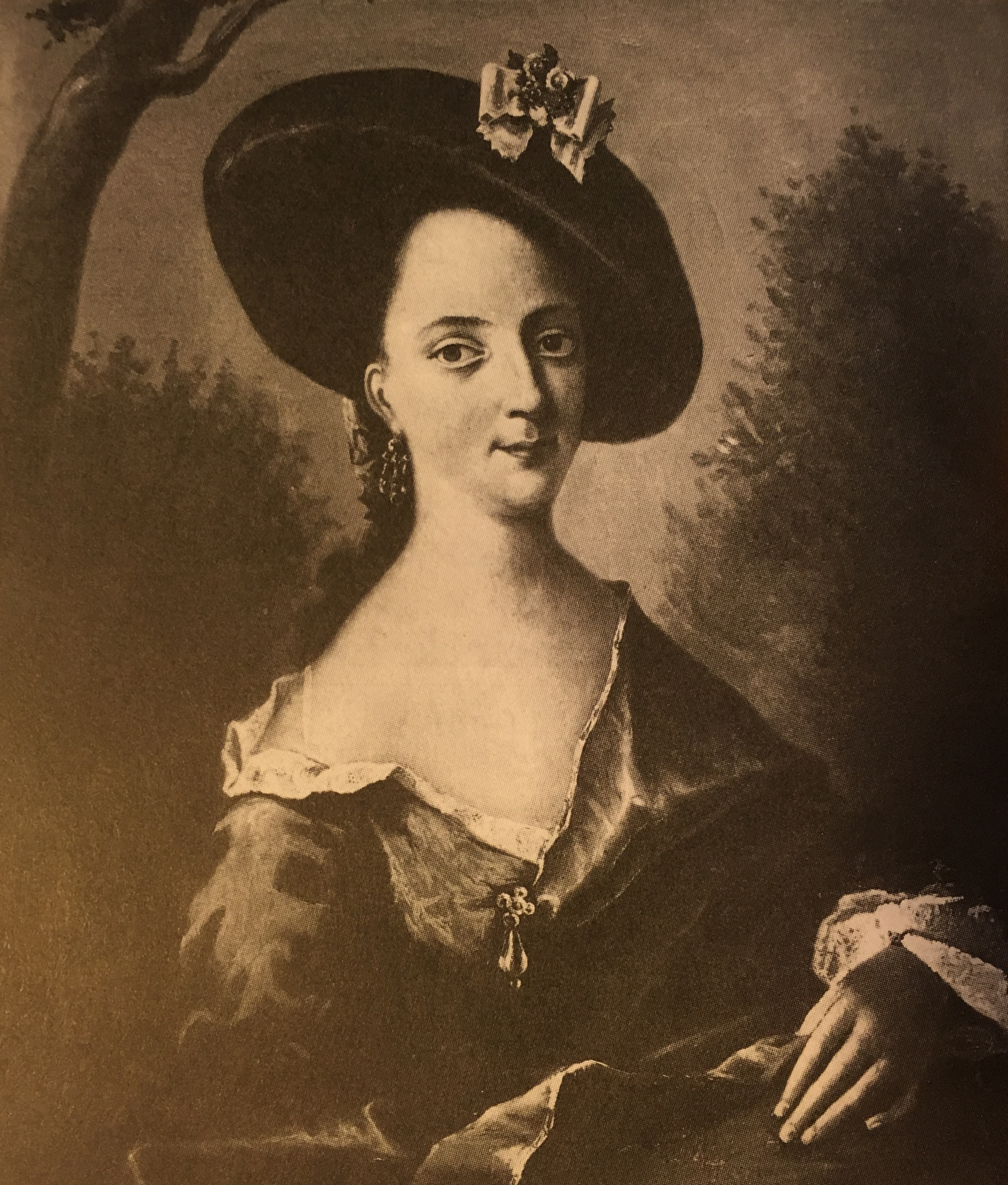
- Born: Catharina Meincke; Trondheim, Norway
- Occupations: Businesswoman and ship-owner
- Spouse: Broder Brodersen Lysholm (1763–1772)
- Parent(s): Hilmar Meincke and Catharina Mølmann

Catharina Lysholm (née Meincke; 1744 - 9 December 1815), was a Norwegian businesswoman and ship-owner.

Catharina Meincke was born at Trondheim in Trøndelag, Norway. She was the daughter of merchant and office holder Hilmar Meincke (1710–1771) and Catharina Mølmann (1720–1748). In 1763, she married merchant Broder Brodersen Lysholm (1734–1772), then one of the most successful merchants in Trondheim. Both her father and husband had originated from Flensburg in Southern Schleswig.

She acquired wealth through both inheritance and marriage. Her father was co-owner of the copper works at Løkken and Røros, organized a West Indies company and operated a tobacco factory. Upon his death, she inherited the bulk of his estate. Upon the death of her spouse in 1772, she took over his business interests in partnership with Hans Carl Knudtzon who had moved to Trondheim from Bredstedt in North Frisia.

She managed the perhaps largest ship company in Trondheim from 1772-1779 operating under the name Fru Agentinde Lysholm & Co. By 1779, she was one of the co-founders and owners of the city's shipyard at which time she pulled herself out of the company and Knudtzon became the sole owner.

She was a leading figure in the city's commercial life, and was honored by being saluted upon her return to the city after business trips. She participated in philanthropy, and erected several buildings, among them the manor at Havstein (1772), which became a center of the local upper class society.

A street at Ferstad in Trondheim district of Byåsen was named after her in 1986.
