= Knutzon =

Knutzon is a surname. Notable people with this surname include:

- Jason Knutzon (born 1976), American golfer
- Lars Knutzon (born 1941), Danish actor and director

== See also ==
- Knutson
- Knutzen
