= Knutzen =

Knutzen is a surname. Notable people with the surname include:

- Egill Knutzen (1914–1990), Norwegian fencer
- Jan Knutzen (born 1943), Norwegian documentary filmmaker
- Martin Knutzen (1713–1751), German philosopher
- Matthias Knutzen (1646–after 1674), German atheist
- Thea Knutzen (1930–2016), Norwegian politician
- William Knutzen (1913–1983), Norwegian ceramist

== See also ==
- Knutzen Peak, a mountain of Ellsworth Land, Antarctica
- Knutzon
