= Canute (given name) =

Canute is an anglicisation of the Scandinavian name Knut. It may refer to:

== Medieval era ==
- Cnut or Canute the Great (c. 995 – 1035), King of Denmark, England and Norway
- Harthacnut or Canute III (c. 1018 – 1042), King of Denmark and England, son of Cnut the Great
- Knut Eriksson (before 1150–1195/96), King of Sweden
- Knut Långe (died 1234), King of Sweden
- Canute IV of Denmark (c. 1042 – 1086), King of Denmark and Roman Catholic saint
- Canute V of Denmark (c. 1129 – 1157), King of Denmark
- Canute VI of Denmark (1163–1202), King of Denmark
- Canute, Duke of Estonia (1205–1260), bastard son of Valdemar II of Denmark
- Canute Lavard (1096–1131), a Danish prince, first Duke of Schleswig and Roman Catholic saint
- Canute Porse the Elder (died 1330), Danish Duke of Samsø, Duke of Halland and Duke of Estonia
- Canute Mikkelsen, Roman Catholic Bishop of Viborg from 1451 to 1478

== Modern world ==
- Canute Anderson (1830–1893), American politician, a member of the Wisconsin State Assembly
- Canute Caliste (1914–2005), a naive painter from Grenada
- Canute Curtis (born 1974), former National Football League player
- Canute R. Matson (1843–1903), Sheriff of Cook County, Illinois
- Canute Peterson (1824–1902), Mormon pioneer and church leader

== See also ==
- Yakima Canutt (1895–1986), American champion rodeo rider, actor, stuntman and action director
