= Hans Carl Knudtzon =

Norwegian merchant, ship-owner and politician

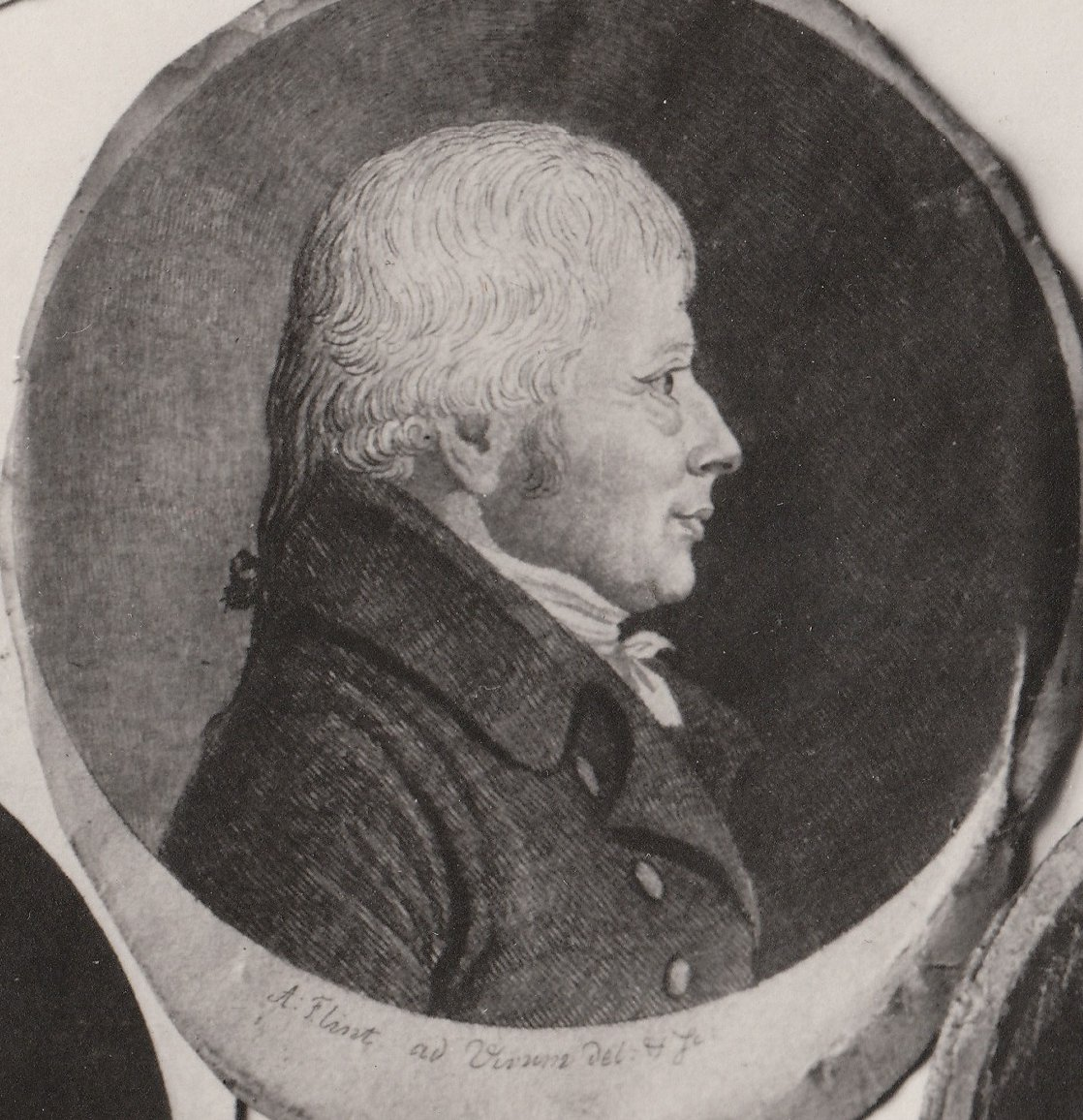
Hans Carl Knudtzon

Hans Carl Knudtzon (29 January 1751 – 16 December 1823) was a Norwegian merchant, ship-owner and politician. Born in the north of Germany to a mercantile family, he travelled to Trondheim, Norway, where he had success in the trading business. He was also successful within politics, acting as vice burgomaster and subsequently burgomaster of Trondheim. At the end of his life he was decorated with numerous orders.

== Early and personal life ==
Knudtzon was born in Bredstedt, North Frisia, Duchy of Schleswig, Denmark-Norway (now part of the Schleswig-Holstein state in Germany), the son of Nicolai Knudtzen (1698–1785), merchant, and his wife, Magdalena (1726–1803), née Clausen. His brother was Nicolay Knudtzon (1757–1842), who went on to become one of the foremost merchants of the Norwegian city of Kristiansund.

On 1 January 1779, he married Karen Müller (1752–1818), who bore him six children: sons Frederik Nicolay (1779–1823), Jørgen (1784–1854), Christian (1787–1870), Broder (1788–1864), and the daughters Magdalena Boletta (1779–1803) and Sarah Marie (1782–1854).

A son-in-law was Lorentz Johannsen (1769–1837), who married his daughters successively. Knudtzon's great-grandson was linguist Jørgen Alexander Knudtzon (1854–1917).

== Career ==
In 1767, he travelled to Trondheim where he was apprenticed to Broder Brodersen Lysholm, who also had moved from Sleswick to further his career as a merchant. Upon Lysholm's death, his widow Catharina Meincke Lysholm inherited large sums of money and continued her husband's business together with Knudtzon. After an intermezzo with Knudtzon's son-in-law—Johann Braack—as partner, Knudtzon became sole proprietor of the business, which eventually was renamed Hans Knudtzon & Co. The company became one of Trondheim's foremost trading businesses, exchanging amongst other commodities fish, wood, copper, grain and salt on a fleet of more than 20 ships.

Knudtzon was also engaged in politics; he was elected vice burgomaster of Trondheim in 1789 and burgomaster in 1802. He was furthermore involved in the political events surrounding the 1814 constitution, vehemently arguing in favour of a Norwegian central bank. A biographer describes him as an urban man influenced by the liberal ideas of Great Britain. In 1788, he became a member of the Royal Norwegian Society of Sciences and Letters. He was decorated as a Knight of the Danish Dannebrog Order in 1809 and of the Swedish Polar Star Order in 1815. He died in December 1823 in Trondheim.
