= Lorentz Johannsen =

Norwegian merchant and member of the Norwegian Parliament

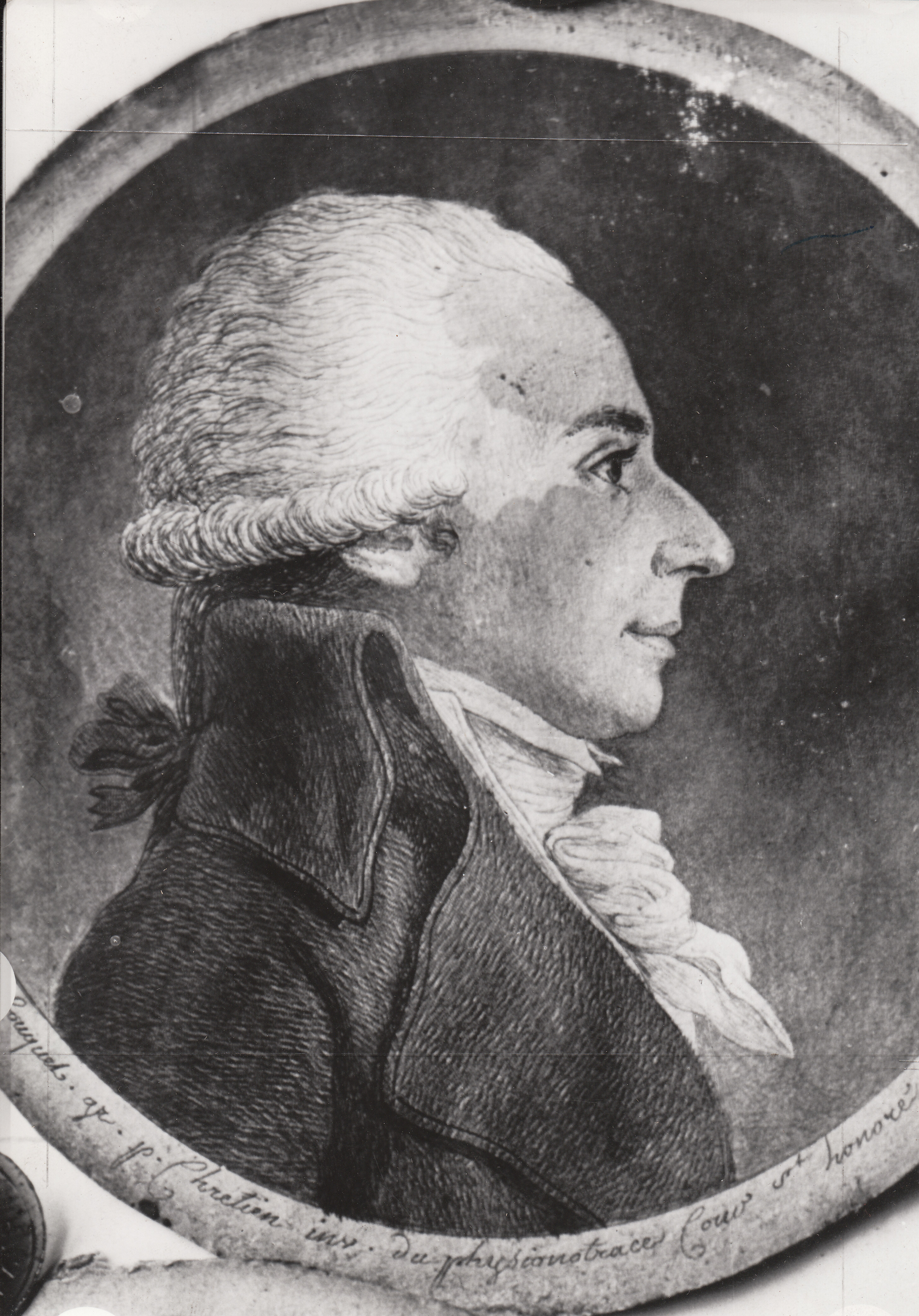
Lorentz Johannsen

Lorentz Johannsen (14 September 1769 – 27 April 1837) was a Norwegian merchant and member of the Norwegian Parliament.

Lorentz Johannsen was born at Glücksburg in the district of Schleswig-Flensburg in Schleswig-Holstein (now in Germany). In 1801, he was married with Magdalena Boletta Knudtzon (1779-1803). In 1804, he married Sarah Marie Knudtzon 1782-1854), sister of his first wife.

Both of his wives were daughters of Hans Carl Knudtzon (1751-1823) who was a successful merchant in Trondheim, Norway. Hans Carl Knudtzon had been born in Bredstedt, in the district of Nordfriesland, Schleswig-Holstein. Knudtzon had moved to Trondheim where he founded Hans Knudtzon & Co. a wholesale trading company. Following his marriage, Lorentz Johannsen became a partner with his father-in-law at the trading firm. The company grew to become one of foremost trading firms in Trondheim. The firm operated its own fleet of ships and was engaged in the trade of commodities.

Through his marriages, he was a brother-in-law of both Jørgen von Cappelen Knudtzon and Broder Knudtzon. Johannsen was vice-consul for the United Kingdom and the Netherlands from 1817 to 1829. Johannsen was member of the Norwegian Parliament from Trondheim in 1818, 1821 and 1822. From 1821, Johannsen was a member of the Supervisory Council of Norges Bank. In 1823, he was one of the founders of Trondhjems Savings Bank.

== Related Reading ==
- Bratberg, Terje (1996) Trondheim byleksikon (Oslo: Kunnskapsforlaget) ISBN 82-573-0642-8
