= R.W. Knudsen Family =

American juice brand

- Industry: Beverage
- Founded: 1961; 65 years ago
- Founder: Russell W. Knudsen
- Products: Natural bottled juice
- Parent: TruRoots Company (2022–present)
- Website: rwknudsen.com

R.W. Knudsen Family is an American brand of bottled natural juices that was created by Russell W. Knudsen in 1961.

On January 31, 2022, Smucker's sold the brand to Nexus Capital Management LP.

== See also ==
- List of food companies
