= Jørgen von Cappelen Knudtzon =

Norwegian businessman and patron of the arts (1784–1854)

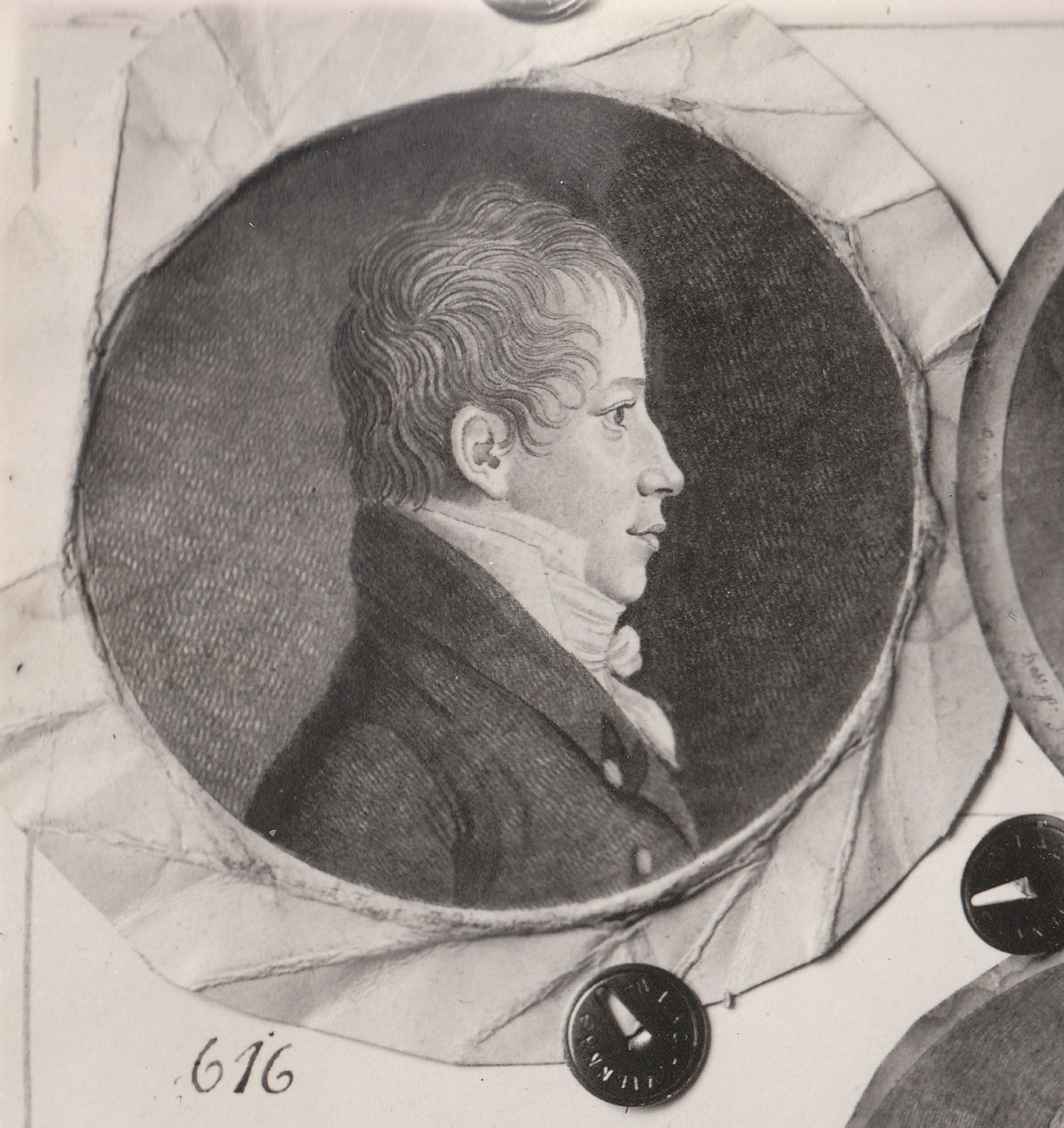
Jørgen von Cappelen Knudtzon

Jørgen von Cappelen Knudtzon (28 April 1784 – 29 July 1854) was a Norwegian businessman and patron of the arts. Born in Trondheim to a prosperous mercantile family of German extraction, he travelled to Hamburg, Germany to study commerce. Upon his father's death, he inherited the family business, though his brother-in-law Lorentz Johannsen became its director. With the family firm's trade ships Knudtzon often travelled to foreign destinations in Southeast Asia. At one occasion the ship wrecked; in the subsequent tumult he made friends with the Scot Alexander Baillie, with whom he would later travel around Europe.

His profound interest in art was expressed in his numerous donations to artists and his own art collection, which included both antiquities and contemporary artworks. The Danish sculptor Bertel Thorvaldsen made sculptures of Knudtzon and Baillie; as an expression of gratitude, Knudtzon advocated the creation of a museum dedicated to Thorvaldsen in Copenhagen.

== Biography ==
Jørgen von Cappelen Knudtzon was born on 28 April 1784 in Trondheim; he was the second child of Hans Carl Knudtzon (1751–1823), a merchant and politician, and Karen Knudtzon (née Müller, 1752–1818). His father was born in Bredstedt, North Frisia (now part of the German state of Schleswig-Holstein) and had established himself as a leading businessman in Trondheim. In 1794, with the family firm flourishing financially, Knudtzon enrolled at a military academy in Copenhagen. He was, however, contemptuous of a possible military career, and decided to travel to the German city of Hamburg to study commerce.

Jørgen von Cappelen Knudtzon did not belong to the Norwegian Cappelen family but was named after a friend of his father from that family.

Following his father's death, his brother-in-law Lorentz Johannsen (1769–1837) became director of the family business. Knudtzon saw the opportunity to travel to foreign destinations as supercargo on the firm's trade ships; he once travelled to the West Indies in a ship that wrecked near Jamaica. On the rescue ship he met the young Scot Alexander Baillie, who became his friend and lifelong associate. They travelled around together in Europe, meeting Napoleon, Lord Byron and the sculptor Bertel Thorvaldsen.

On his return from Europe, Knudtzon established himself as a benefactor in Trondheim. With his profound interest in art, he gave donations to Norwegian artists and maintained a personal art collection with artworks from both antiquity and his own time. In the years 1815–1816, Bertel Thorvaldsen made busts of Jørgen Knudtzon, Jørgen's father and Baillie, which Jørgen's brother Broder Knudtzon subsequently bequeathed to the Royal Norwegian Society of Sciences and Letters. In the later years of his life, Knudtzon championed the creation of the Thorvaldsen Museum which opened during 1848 in Copenhagen.
