= Knutsen Lake =

Lake in the state of Minnesota, United States

- Location within Minnesota
- Location: Waseca County, Minnesota
- Coordinates: 44°10′3″N 93°31′21″W
- Type: lake

Knutsen Lake is a lake in Waseca County, in the U.S. state of Minnesota.

Knutsen Lake was named for Gullick Knutsen, a Norwegian settler who served as a county clerk.
