= Terje Bratberg =

Norwegian historian and encyclopedist

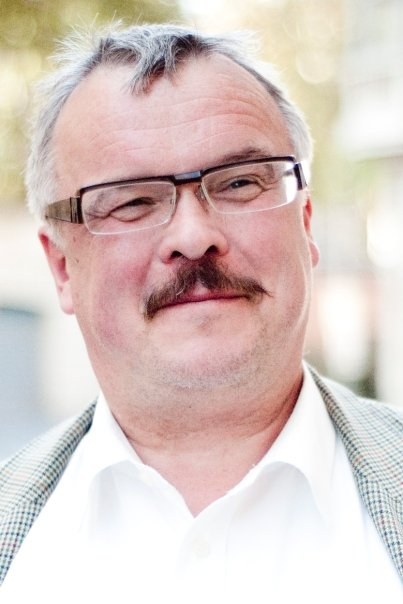
Terje Bratberg

Terje Torberg Vevik Bratberg (born 17 January 1955) is a Norwegian historian and encyclopedist. He got his cand.philol. degree with his thesis on Jens Bjelke in 1990. Bratberg is the editor of the Norwegian language-encyclopedia on the city Trondheim, named Trondheim byleksikon.

== Works ==
- Munkholmen, editor with Øivind Lunde and Jill Løhre, 2008
- Gårds- og slektshistorie for Rissa, 2007
- Austrått : herregård i tusen år, 2006
- Trondheim byleksikon, numerous editions
- Utviklingen av et norsk storgods på 1660-tallet : Jens Bjelkes gods 1610-1665, main thesis in history, 1990
- Harald Nissen og Terje Bratberg: Schønings våpenbok – Gamle Norske Adel Efter et gammelt Manuskript Assessor Ifver Hirtzholm tilhørende, Pirforlaget, Trondheim 2013
