= Kristen Knutson =

Neurologist

Kristen Knutson is an associate professor of neurology, working at the Northwestern University Feinberg School of Medicine. With researchers from the University of Surrey, she studied the mortality rate of half a million people over 6.5 years and concluded that people who self identify as "definite evening type" had a 10 percent higher mortality rate than those who identified as "definite morning type". It was the first study of its type to look into the mortality rate of night owls.
