= List of storms named Knut =

The name Knut was used for two tropical cyclones in the Eastern Pacific Ocean.

- Tropical Storm Knut (1981) Tropical Storm that made landfall in Mexico
- Tropical Storm Knut (1987) Weak Tropical Storm that did not affect land

In 1992, the name Knut was retired for unknown reasons, and replaced with Kenneth for the 1993 season.
