= Mail jumping =

Type of mail delivery

Mail jumping is a type of mail delivery where the postal carrier (known as a mail jumper) arrives by boat, jumps onto a dock, places incoming mail in a mailbox, retrieves outgoing mail, and jumps back onto the boat. The boat continues to move at a slow and steady pace (about 5 miles per hour (8 km/h)) while the mail jumper is jumping.

== Geneva Lake ==
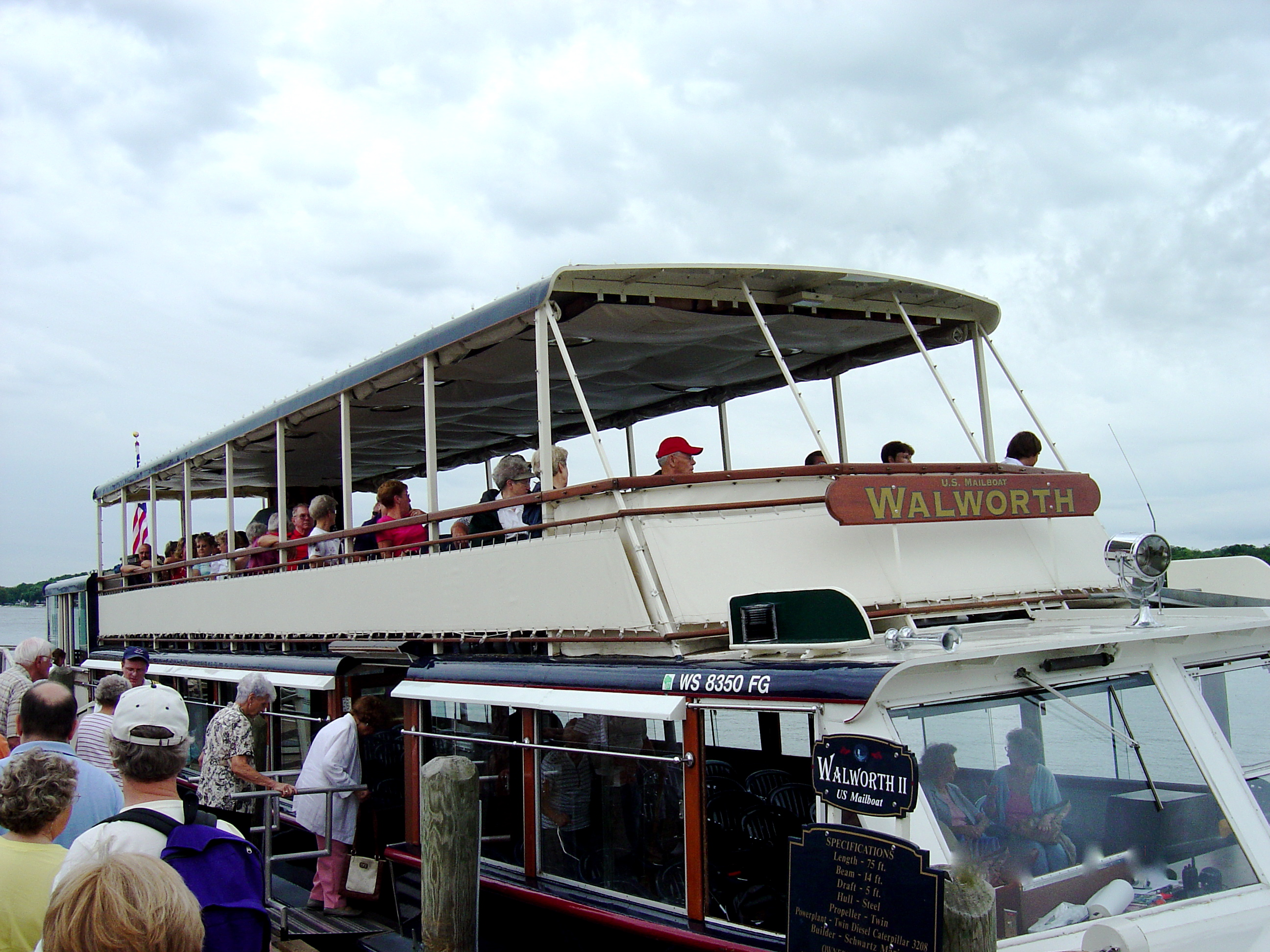
Walworth II on Geneva Lake

The mail jumping delivery system has been employed on houses surrounding Geneva Lake in Walworth County, Wisconsin, United States, since before first roads were built around the lake in the late 19th century. Decent roads were first built around the lake in the 1920s. Some residents still use boats as their primary means of transportation to their summer homes on the lake.

Six jumpers are hired annually to deliver mail on behalf of the United States Postal Service each summer from June 15 until September 15. Only male jumpers were used until the first woman was hired in 1974. Since then, they have been mostly women. Jumpers began daily at 7 a.m. by sorting mail. Delivery begins at 10 a.m. aboard the U.S. Mailboat Walworth II. Mail is delivered to approximately 60 houses. Delivery is completed by around 1 p.m. A typical jumper misses the jump returning to the boat at least once in their career and works the rest of the day wet.

The Lake Geneva Cruise Lines has operated the boat since 1916. It takes approximately 160 tourists along. Most mail runs are at full capacity. Jumpers are expected to be able to speak as tour guides as the tour passes historic summer houses and Yerkes Observatory. The jumpers are privately hired by the cruise line and they work closely with the U.S. Postal Service. The Walworth II is the only mail jumping boat in the United States. Mail has been delivered this way since 1873. A local resident said "There was a time during the war when everyone really counted on the mailboat. We didn't have TV and computers and all of that, so everyone would gather to meet the mailboat."

== References in popular culture ==
The Travel Channel host Andrew Zimmern taped an episode of his show Bizarre World in which he worked as a mail jumper.

National Public Radio member station WUWM made an episode on mail jumping on August 6, 2014.

YouTuber Tom Scott tried mail jumping on August 16, 2022.

== See also ==
- Boat railway post office – Over-water postal service in the US
- J. W. Westcott II – Mail boat and floating ZIP Code
