= Nelly Bell Knutsen =

Norwegian politician

- Born: 27 April 1905
- Died: 23 October 1991 (aged 86)
- Occupation: Politician

Nelly Bell Knutsen (27 April 1905 – 23 October 1991) was a Norwegian politician for the Christian Democratic Party.

== Political career ==
Knutsen served as a deputy representative to the Norwegian Parliament from Hordaland during the term 1961–1965.
