= Delrae Knutson =

American actress

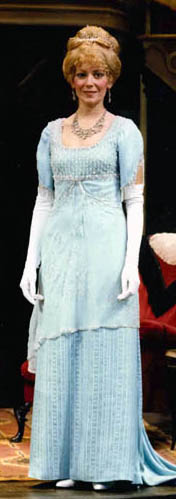
Delrae as Eliza Doolittle

Delrae Knutson (also known as Delrae Novak) is a stage actress and singer from Minnesota, USA specializing in musical comedy. She started her career in 1981 and has performed in theaters throughout the United States and Canada, though most of her work has been in the Twin Cities region of Minnesota, USA.

== Career highlights ==
From 1981 to 1997 Delrae performed leading lady roles at Chanhassen Dinner Theatres, the largest dinner theater in the USA, and in 1989 she was named Chanhassen Dinner Theaters’ top actress of the decade in the national theatrical publication Backstage.

While Delrae was performing the part of Eliza Doolittle in My Fair Lady in 1987, the Governor of Minnesota, Rudy Perpich who was also a friend of Delrae's father, signed a new State Proclamation. Referencing that the character Eliza Doolittle was visiting the Twin Cities, he proclaimed that May 20 would henceforth be "Eliza Doolittle Day" in recognition that "...educational training in speech, diction and grammar is a valued asset in achieving a successful and happy future...".

In 1997 Delrae performed in The Odd Couple during a six-month tour of North America with Troupe America Inc. She played the part of 'Gwendolyn Pigeon' alongside M*A*S*H stars Jamie Farr and William Christopher.

== Formative years ==
Delrae was born and raised in northern Minnesota with one older brother. Her mother was of Swedish ancestry and was a grade school teacher while her father, of Norwegian heritage, was very active in civic matters and state politics and was mayor of her home town for many years.

Originally, Delrae had planned to study to become a music teacher, but she discovered her penchant for acting and singing when an unexpected opportunity arose to take the lead role in an amateur production at her University. She gained her Bachelor of Arts summa cum laude in Drama/Theatre Arts and Stagecraft from Minnesota State University and then went on to study at the London Academy of Music and Dramatic Art in the UK.

== Acting roles ==
Chanhassen Dinner Theatres, Chanhassen, Minnesota:
She Loves Me (Amalia)
The Mystery of Edwin Drood (Edwin Drood)
Guys and Dolls (Sarah)
The Music Man (Marian)
Camelot (Guenevere)
My Fair Lady (Eliza)
42nd Street (Dorothy Brock, 1988 production)
42nd Street (Dorothy Brock, 1995 production)
South Pacific (Nellie)
The Sound of Music (Elsa)
Brigadoon (Jane)
Annie (Grace)
I Do! I Do! (Agnes)
Brighton Beach Memoirs (Kate)
Lend Me a Tenor (Maggie)
The Foreigner (Catherine)
Chapter Two (Faye)
Groucho: A Life in Revue (Women in Groucho's Life)

Troupe America Inc., Minneapolis, Minnesota:
Performed in the 1997 six-month tour of The Odd Couple (Gwendolyn Pigeon) in over 95 theaters throughout the US and Canada, with M*A*S*H stars Jamie Farr and William Christopher.

Arizona Theatre Company, Tucson, Arizona:
The Importance of Being Earnest (Gwendolen)
The Boys Next Door (Mrs. Fremus, Mrs. Warren, Clara)
Quilters (LouAnn)
My Fair Lady (Chorus, Eliza Understudy)

Ruby’s Cabaret, Minneapolis, Minnesota:
Sing Me No Love Songs

Carousel Dinner Theatre, Ravenna, Ohio:
Oliver (Nancy)
Show Boat (Chorus, Magnolia Understudy)

=== Directing ===
Delrae created and directed a Blue Man Group parody in collaboration with the production company, InHouse Media, to support the roll-out of the new "Wow" photography program at Lifetouch National School Studios. The production was presented at the Minneapolis Convention Center Minnesota.
