= Trondheim byleksikon =

Book by Terje Bratberg

- Cover of the 2008 edition
- Author: Terje Bratberg
- Language: Norwegian
- Subject: Trondheim
- Genre: Encyclopedia
- Publisher: Kunnskapsforlaget
- Publication date: 1996, 2008
- Publication place: Norway

Trondheim byleksikon ("Trondheim City Encyclopedia") is a printed encyclopedia which covers Trondheim, Norway. Published by Kunnskapsforlaget and written by Terje Bratberg, the first edition was published in 1996 ahead of the city's 1000th anniversary the following year. The first edition contained 4200 entries. Støren's book contents have been an important part of the basic material for the city encyclopedia. Place and name in Trondheim referred only to the districts that lay within the city limits of 1892, as well as Bymarka and the old Lade parish, that is, Strinda herred with the exception of Bratsberg parish. The districts of Tiller, Leinstrand and Byneset were therefore not covered. The second edition was published in 2008 and contains 5000 entries. According to the author, a large part of the expansion is connected with better coverage of businesses and commerce.

== Editions ==
Terje Bratberg, editor (1996). Trondheim city encyclopedia (1 ed.). Kunnskapsforlaget. p. 680. ISBN 978-82-573-0642-7. Electronic reproduction.

Terje Bratberg, ed. (2008). Trondheim city encyclopedia (2 ed.). Kunnskapsforlaget. p. 724 + 27 pages, map. ISBN 978-82-573-1762-1
