= Knuth =

Knuth is a surname of Nordic origin. Bearers of the name include:

- Carl Conrad Gustav Knuth, Baron Knuth (1761–1815), Danish landowner and second Director of the Royal Danish Mail
- Daniel Knuth, American politician, environmentalist and educator
- Donald Knuth (born 1938), American computer scientist
- Eggert Christopher Knuth (1722–1776), Danish landowner, judge, and administrator
- Eigil Knuth (1903–1996), Danish explorer and archaeologist
- Estefania Knuth (born 1973), Spanish golfer
- Frederik Marcus Knuth (taxonomist) (1904–1970), Danish taxonomist
- Frederik Marcus Knuth (1813-1856), Danish aristocrat, civil servant and politician, first Minister of Foreign Affairs of Denmark
- Gustav Knuth (1901–1987), German film actor
- Jason Knuth, the subject of the dedication of Silver Session for Jason Knuth, a 1998 EP by Sonic Youth
- Jeff Knuth (born 1962), Australian politician
- Joschka Knuth (born 1993), German politician
- Kate Knuth (born 1981), American politician
- Marcus Knuth (born 1976), Danish politician
- Paul Knuth (1854–1900), German taxonomist, botanist and pteridologist
- Reinhard Gustav Paul Knuth (1874–1957), German botanist
- Shane Knuth (born 1966), Australian politician
- Shay Knuth (born 1945), Playboy' Playmate of the Month for September 1969
- Stén Knuth (born 1964), Danish politician

== See also ==
- Knut (disambiguation).
