= MT Sidsel Knutsen =

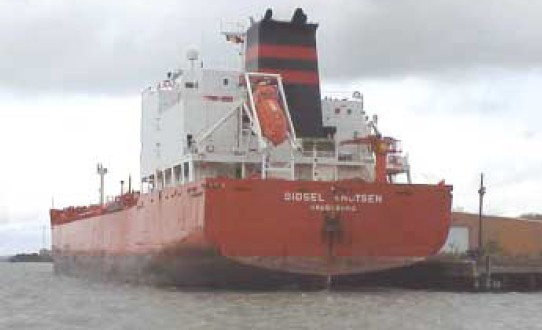
- Sidsel Knutsen

History
- Name: Sidsel Knutsen
- Operator: Knutsen O.A.S. Shipping
- Launched: 3 July 1993
- Completed: 1993
- Identification: IMO number: 9019779; Call sign: LASM4
- Fate: Broken up at Lagos in October 2018

General characteristics
- Class & type: Chemical tanker
- Tonnage: 22,617 DWT
- Length: 162.52 m (533 ft 2 in) o/a; 155.06 m (508 ft 9 in) p/p
- Beam: 23 m (75 ft 6 in)
- Draught: 9.736 m (31 ft 11.3 in) summer draught
- Capacity: 1,000,000 gallons

MT Sidsel Knutsen was a Norwegian oil tanker built in 1993.

== Design ==
Sidsel Knutsen was 533-foot (162 m) long and was owned and operated by Knutsen O.A.S. Shipping. The ship was designed for the shipping of oil products, including gasoline, plain crude oil, and biodiesel. The Sidsel Knutsen also had a sister ship, Turid Knutsen, which is also a tanker, and was built in 1993. The home port of both ships was Haugesund, Norway. Both ships were capable of hauling 5,000 tons of cargo and were commonly loaded with over 1,000,000 gallons of various liquids. Sidsel Knutsen makes frequent trips from Norway to the United States to pick up loads of biodiesel and deliver them to European ports. The company that Sidsel Knutsen gets her biodiesel from Lake Erie Biofuels in Erie, Pennsylvania. It was a major producer of biofuel in the United States.

== Incidents ==
=== 2001 ===
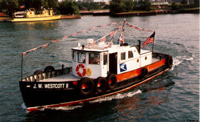
J W Wescott II

Sidsel Knutsen is perhaps best known for an incident that occurred in the Detroit River in October 2001. A mail boat, J. W. Westcott II, capsized shortly after 0700 on an October morning as she was delivering a pilot to Sidsel Knutsen. J. W. Westcott's captain and a deckhand, were killed in the incident. Two Canadian pilots who were aboard J. W. Westcott swam to safety in the fast-moving river that separates Detroit from Windsor, Ontario. Sidsel Knutsen was undamaged by the incident because of her large size and steel hull.

=== 2010 ===
On 3 August 2010, Sidesel Knusten lost engine power after sustaining an engine fire when traveling north along the St. Clair River. The ship hit a buoy and swung around and headed for the seawall, the ship dropped its anchor before making contact and was only 10 feet from the seawall. This occurred near The Voyageur restaurant during operational hours. No injuries were reported. The ship was repaired and was back in service on 8 August 2010.
