= J. W. Westcott II =

Mail boat and floating ZIP Code

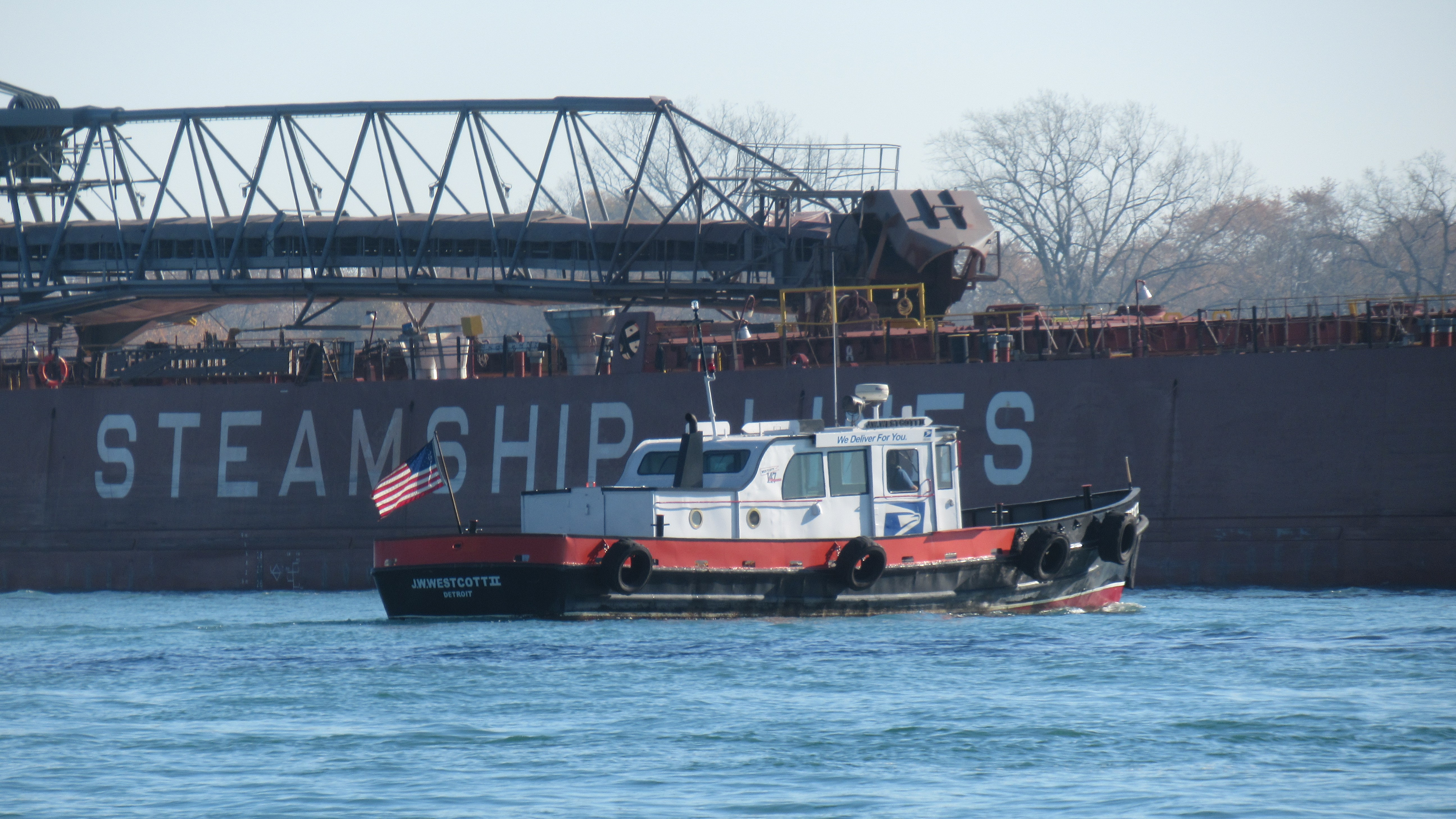
- J.W. Westcott II approaching a Canadian freighter

History

United States
- Name: J. W. Westcott II
- Namesake: Captain John Ward Westcott
- Owner: J. W. Westcott Company
- Route: Detroit River, Great Lakes
- Ordered: 1949
- Builder: Paasch Marine Service, Erie, Pennsylvania
- Home port: Detroit, Michigan
- Identification: Official number: 258859
- Status: in service

General characteristics
- Class & type: Pilot and mail boat
- Tonnage: 14 GT
- Length: 45 ft (14 m)
- Beam: 13 ft (4.0 m)
- Draft: 4 ft (1.2 m)
- Propulsion: Detroit Diesel 6–71, 220 hp (160 kW); May 2010: Cummins Marine QSB 5.9, 305 hp (227 kW)
- Speed: 15 knots

J. W. Westcott II is a post office boat that delivers mail to ships while they are underway. It operates out of Detroit, Michigan, and, as it is an official post office for the United States Postal Service, it also contains the only floating ZIP Code in the United States—48222.

== History ==
The Westcott company was established in 1874 by Captain John Ward Westcott, who ferried supplies (and by 1895 the mail) to passing ships via rowboat. J. W. Westcott II is named for him.

== Operation ==
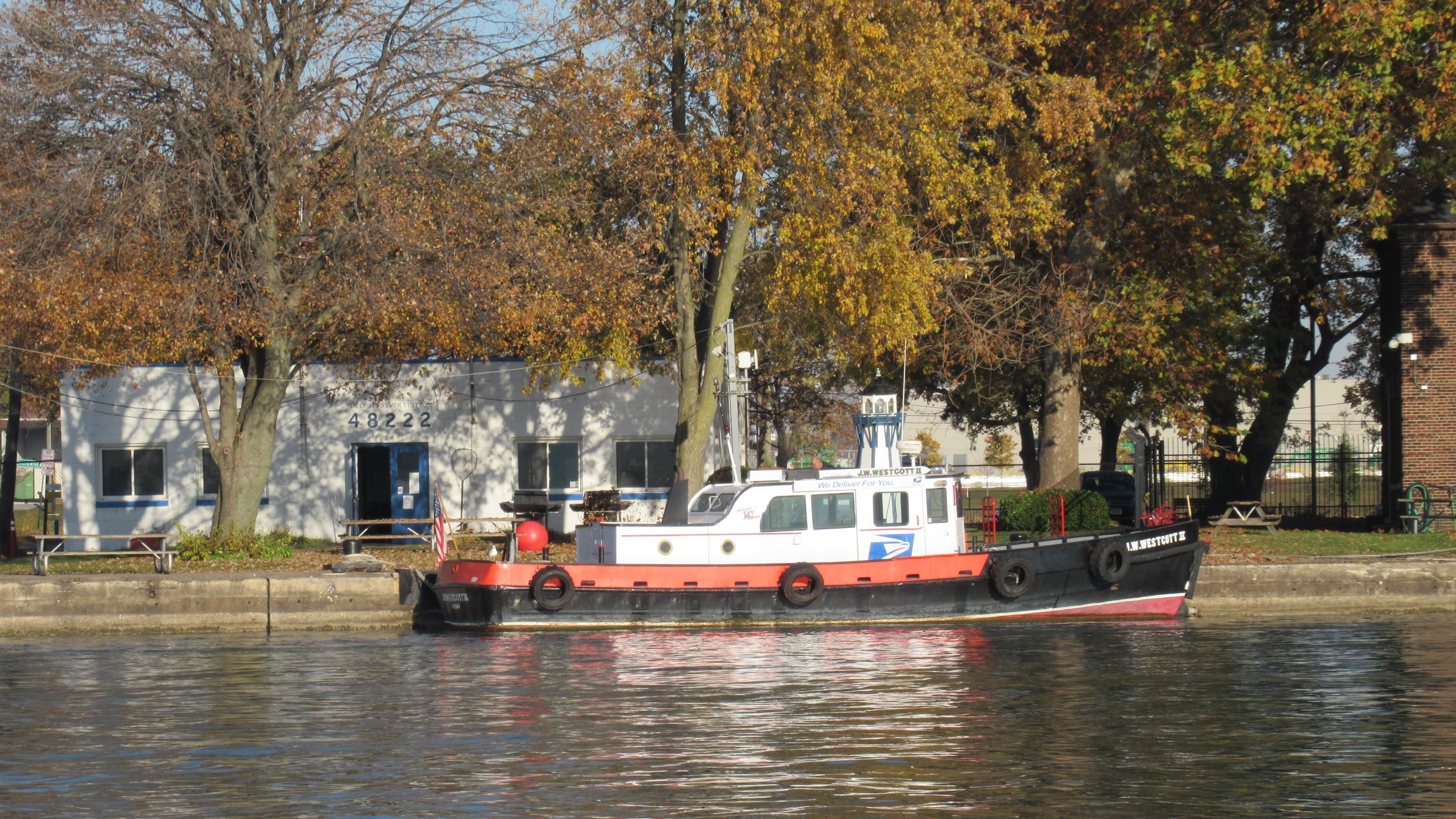
J. W. Westcott II moored near its post office

Any mail addressed to members of ships' crews on vessels transiting the Detroit River can be delivered to them via J. W. Westcott II by being addressed "Vessel Name, Marine Post Office, Detroit, Michigan, 48222." The US postal zip code 48222 is exclusive to the floating post office and its ship addressees; as of 2016, the boat had a contract with the US Postal Service through 2021. The mail is delivered to the appropriate ships (mainly lake freighters) as they transit the Detroit River, utilizing ropes and buckets.

== Sinking ==
On 23 October 2001, J. W. Westcott II sank in the deep water under the Ambassador Bridge while caught in the wake of Norwegian oil tanker MT Sidsel Knutsen. The captain and one other crew member were killed; the two passengers, both pilots, were rescued. J. W. Westcott II was later salvaged, refurbished and returned to service.

== See also ==
- Boat railway post office – Over-water postal service in the US
- Mail jumping – Type of mail delivery
