= Jørgen Alexander Knudtzon =

Norwegian linguist and historian (1854–1917)

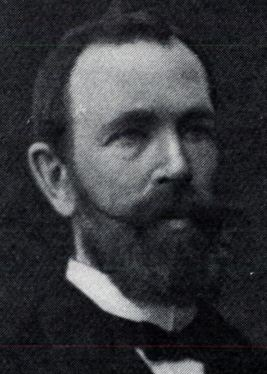

Jørgen Alexander Knudtzon (9 September 1854 – 7 January 1917) was a Norwegian linguist and historian. He was a professor of Semitic Languages at the University of Oslo from 1907.

Knudtzon was born in Trondheim, the son of consul Hans Nicolay Knudtzon (1814–89) and his wife Catharina (1831–79) née Trampe. Having finished his secondary education in 1872, he enrolled at the Royal Frederick University in Christiania. After a short spell at the Cathedral School in Trondheim, he returned to Christiania to study Semitic languages, in particular Akkadian, Arabic and Hebrew, the last of which he also gave lectures on. His first scholarly contribution was Textkritische Bemerkungen zu Lay 17,18, which was published in 1882. In the same decade he studied assyriology and theology in Germany on a university stipend. He returned to Norway after only two years, and resumed his Hebrew teaching. In 1889, he took his dr. phil. degree with the thesis Det saakaldte Perfektum og Imperfektum i Hebraisk ("The So-called Perfect and Preterite in Hebrew").

In recognizing the Hittite language as Indo-European on the basis of two letters from Arzawa (in Western Anatolia), found in Egypt (Die zwei Arzawa-Briefe, 1902), he played an important role in the deciphering of the Hittite language script. In two landmark volumes (1907 and 1915) he published the Amarna letters, diplomatic correspondence of the reign of Pharaoh Amenhotep IV, better known as Akhenaten (1351–1334 BC).

== Works ==
- Assyrische Gebete an den Sonnengott für Staat und königliches Haus aus der Zeit Assahaddons und Asurbanipals. Vol. 2. Leipzig. 1893.
- Die zwei Arzawa Briefe: Die ältesten Urkunden in Indogermanischer Sprache. Leipzig. 1902.
- Die El-Amarna-tafeln, bearb. Leipzig: J. C. Hinrichs. 1908–15.
- Die El-Amarna-Tafeln. 2 vols. Leipzig. 1915.
