= Knut =

Male given name

Knut (Norwegian and Swedish), Knud (Danish), or Knútur (Icelandic) is a Scandinavian and German first name, of which the anglicised form is Canute. In Germany both "Knut" and "Knud" are used. In Spanish and Portuguese Canuto is used which comes from the Latin version Canutus, and in Finland, the name Nuutti is based on the name Knut. The name is derived from the Old Norse Knútr meaning "knot". In English the K is not mute, so the name is not properly pronounced nut or nute.

It is the name of several medieval kings of Denmark, two of whom also reigned over England during the first half of the 11th century.

== People ==
- Harthaknut I of Denmark (Knut I, Danish: Hardeknud) (b. c. 890), king of Denmark
- Knut the Great (Knut II, Danish: Knud den Store or Knud II) (d. 1035), Viking king of England, Denmark and Norway
  - Subject of the apocryphal King Canute and the waves
- Harthaknut (Knut III, Danish: Hardeknud or Knud III) (d. 1042), king of Denmark and England
- Saint Knud IV of Denmark (Danish: Knud IV), king of Denmark (r. 1080–1086) and martyr
- Knud Lavard (d. 1131), Danish prince and saint
- Knud V of Denmark (Danish: Knud V), king of Denmark (r. 1146–1157)
- Knut Eriksson, king of Sweden (r. 1173–1195)
- Knut Långe, king of Sweden (r. 1229–1234)
- Knud VI of Denmark (Danish: Knud VI), king of Denmark (r. 1182–1202)
- Knut Wicksell (1851–1926), Swedish economist
- Knut Wallenberg (1853–1938), Swedish Minister of Foreign Affairs and banker
- Knut Hamsun (1859–1952), Norwegian author
- Knud Rasmussen (1879–1933), Greenlandic polar explorer and anthropologist
- Knute Rockne (1888–1931), American football player and coach
- Knute Cauldwell (1896–1952), American football player
- Knud, Hereditary Prince of Denmark (1900–1976), younger son of King Christian X
- Knud Reimers (1906–1987), Danish yacht designer
- Knut Haukelid (1911–1994), American-born Norwegian soldier and resistance fighter
- Knut Schmidt-Nielsen (1915–2007), Norwegian-born American biologist
- Knut Haugland (1917–2009), Norwegian resistance fighter and explorer
- Knut Risan (1930–2011), Norwegian actor
- Knud Heinesen (1932–2025), Danish politician
- Knut Hergel (1899–1982), Norwegian actor
- Knut Frydenlund (1927–1987), Norwegian Minister of Foreign Affairs
- Knut Engdahl (born 1933), Norwegian politician
- Knut Vollebæk (born 1946), Norwegian Minister of Foreign Affairs
- Knut Knudsen (born 1950), Norwegian cyclist, Olympic and World Champion
- Knut Hamre (born 1952), Norwegian Hardanger fiddle player
- Knute Berger – American journalist, writer and editor (born 1953)
- Knut Fleckenstein (born 1953), German politician
- Knut Petter Torgersen (born 1955), Norwegian politician
- Knut Storberget (born 1964), Norwegian politician and former Minister of Justice
- Knut Abraham (born 1966), German politician
- Knut Reinhardt (born 1968), German footballer
- Knut Arild Hareide (born 1972), leader of Norway's Christian Democratic Party, and a former Minister of the Environment
- Knut Schreiner (born 1974), Norwegian guitarist for Turbonegro, Euroboys, Mirror Lakes, and music producer

== Fictional characters ==
- Adonis Cnut, Rik Mayall's character in the sitcom Believe Nothing

== See also ==
- Knudsen (disambiguation)
- Knutsford
- Knuth
- Kyiv National University of Trade and Economics (KNUTE)
- Nuuttipukki
