= List of Danish suffragists =

This is a list of Danish suffragists who were born in Denmark or whose lives and works are closely associated with that country.

== Suffragists ==
- Nanna Aakjær (1874–1962) – woodcarver, suffragist
- Matilde Bajer (1840–1934) – women's rights activist, suffragist, pacifist
- Jutta Bojsen-Møller (1837–1927) – women's rights activist, suffragist, educator
- Esther Carstensen (1873–1955) – voting rights campaigner, women's rights activist, journal editor
- Helen Clay Pedersen (1862–1950) – British-born Danish women's rights activist and suffragist
- Thora Daugaard (1874–1951) – suffragist, women's rights activist, peace activist, editor
- Charlotte Eilersgaard (1858–1922) – novelist, playwright, women's rights activist, suffragist
- Mathilde Fibiger (1830–1872) – feminist writer
- Eline Hansen (1859–1919) – co-founder of Dansk Kvinderaad, later Danske Kvinders Nationalråd (DKN)
- Meta Hansen (1865–1941) – active in Copenhagen's Women's Suffrage Association and the National Association for Women's Suffrage
- Charlotte Klein (1834–1915) – women's rights activist and educator
- Kristiane Konstantin-Hansen – textile artist, feminist, suffragist
- Line Luplau (1823–1891) – co-founder and chairperson of the Danske Kvindeforeningers Valgretsforbund or DKV
- Elna Munch (1871–1945) – co-founder of the Landsforbundet for Kvinders Valgret (National Association for Women's Suffrage) or LKV
- Johanne Münter (1844–1921) – writer, women's rights activist, suffragist
- Nielsine Nielsen (1850–1916) – physician, suffragist, feminist, politician
- Louise Nørlund (1854–1919) – co-founder and chairperson of the Danske Kvindeforeningers Valgretsforbund or DKV
- Charlotte Norrie (1855–1940) – nurse, feminist, suffragist, educator
- Johanne Rambusch (1865–1944) – co-founder of the Landsforbundet for Kvinders Valgret (Country Association for Women's Suffrage) or LKV
- Vibeke Salicath (1861–1921) – feminist, suffragist and journalist
- Caroline Testman (1839–1919) – co-founder and chairman of the Dansk Kvindesamfund
- Ingeborg Tolderlund (1848–1935) – women's rights advocate and suffragist active in Thisted
- Clara Tybjerg (1864–1941) – feminist, suffragist, peace activist, educator

== Gallery ==
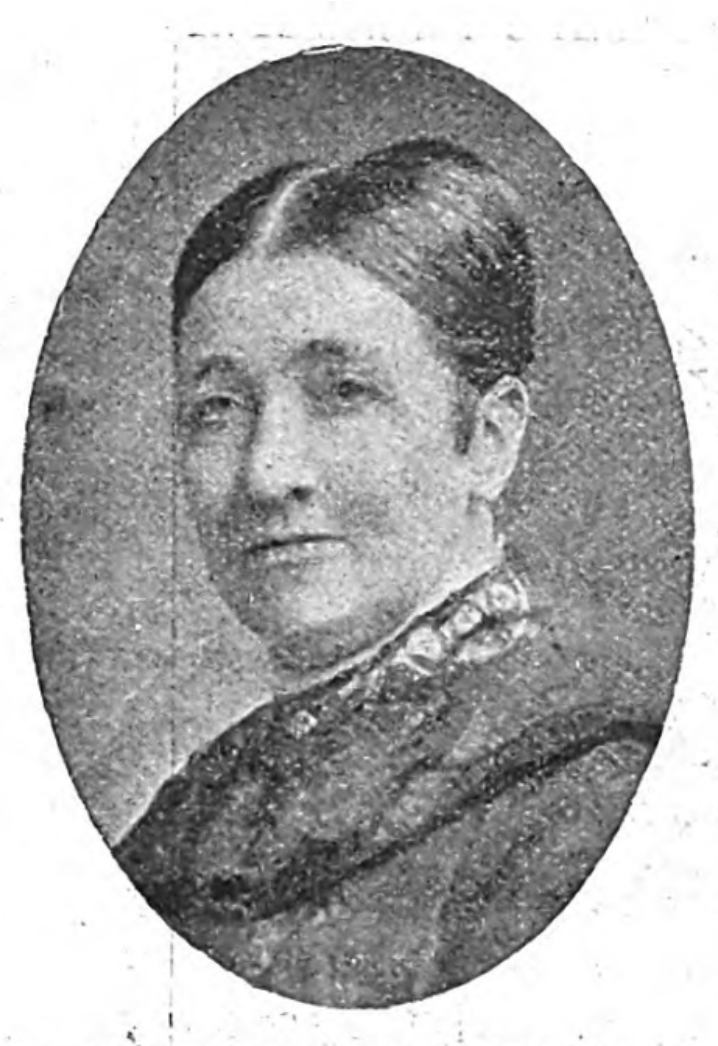
Astrid Stampe Feddersen

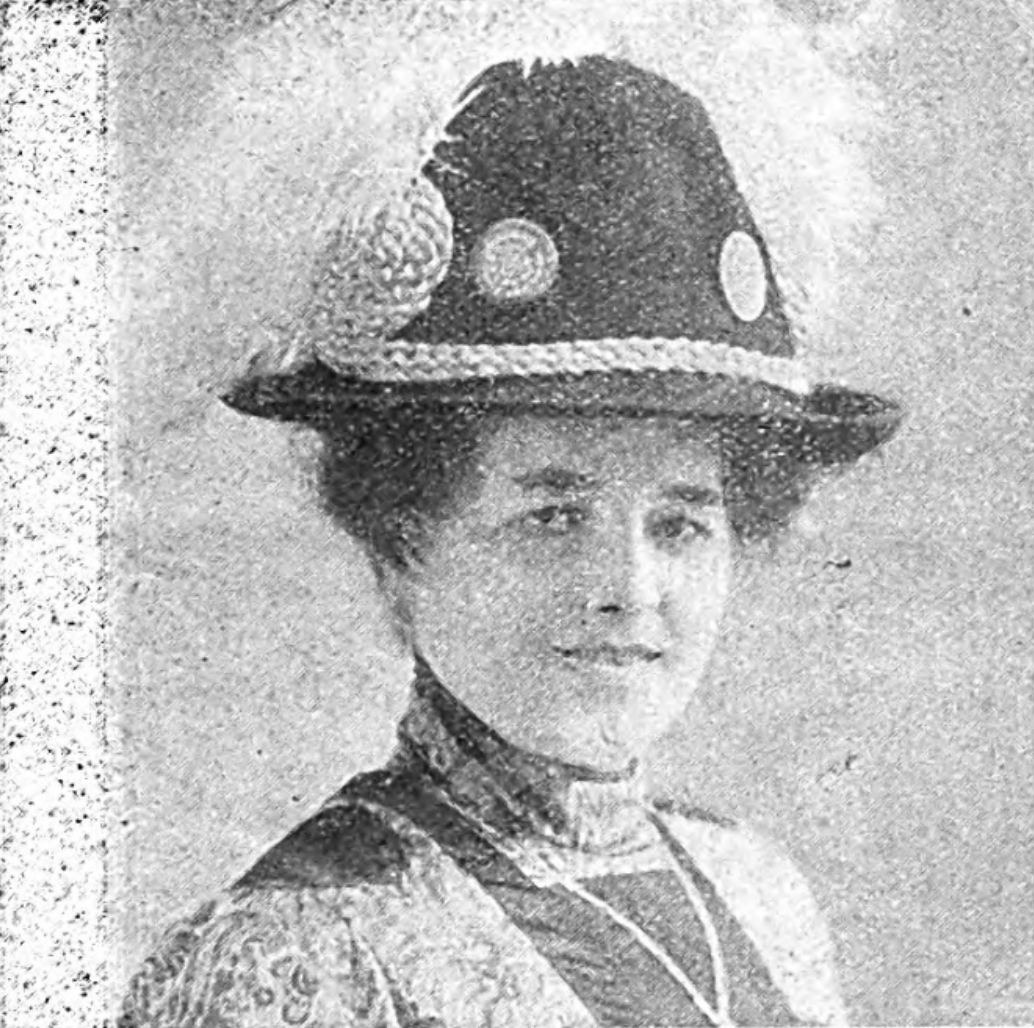
Clinny Dreyer

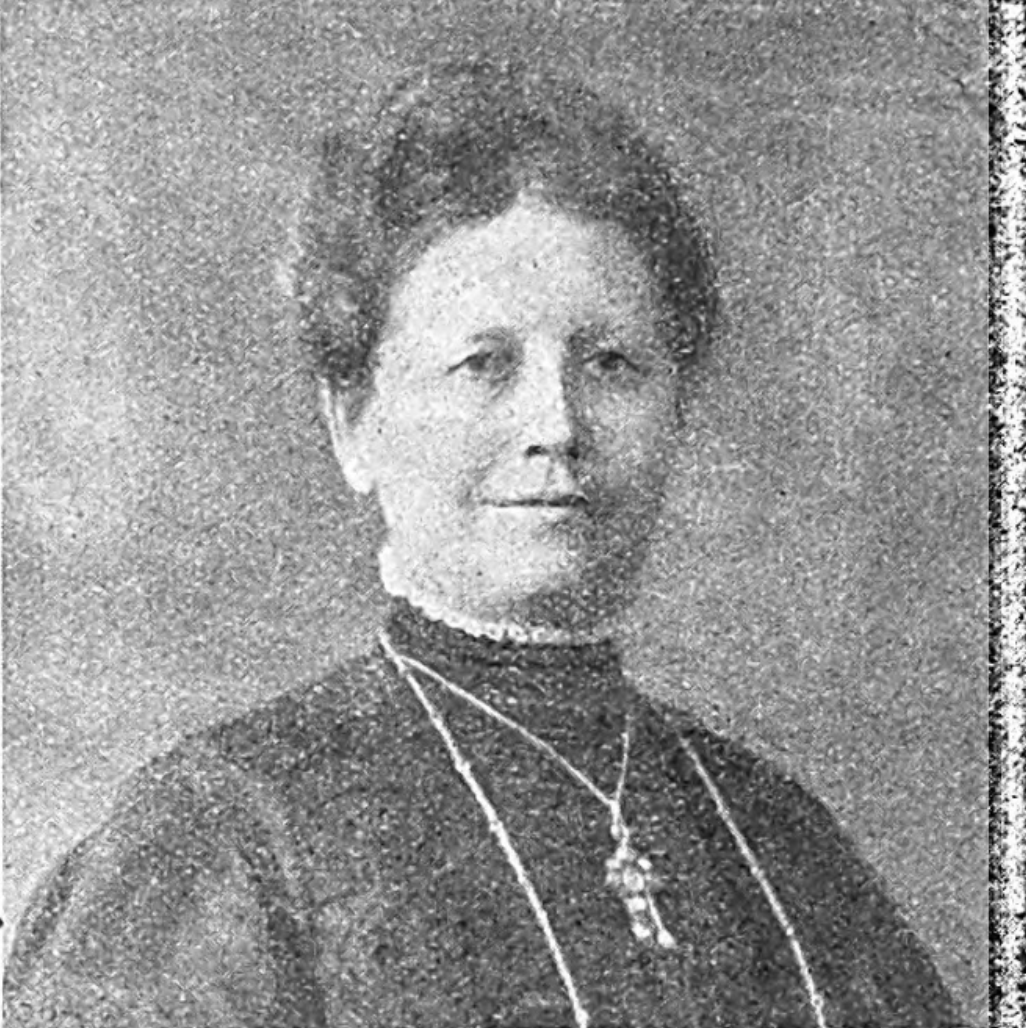
Eline Hansen

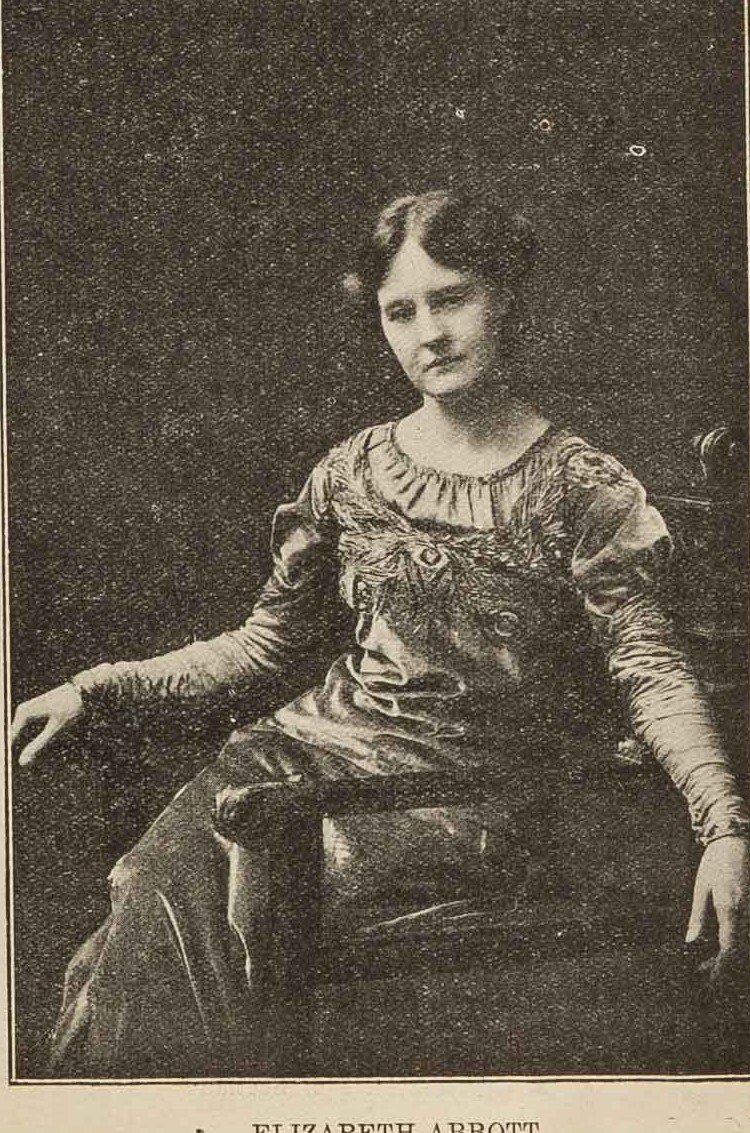
Wilhelmina Hay Abbott

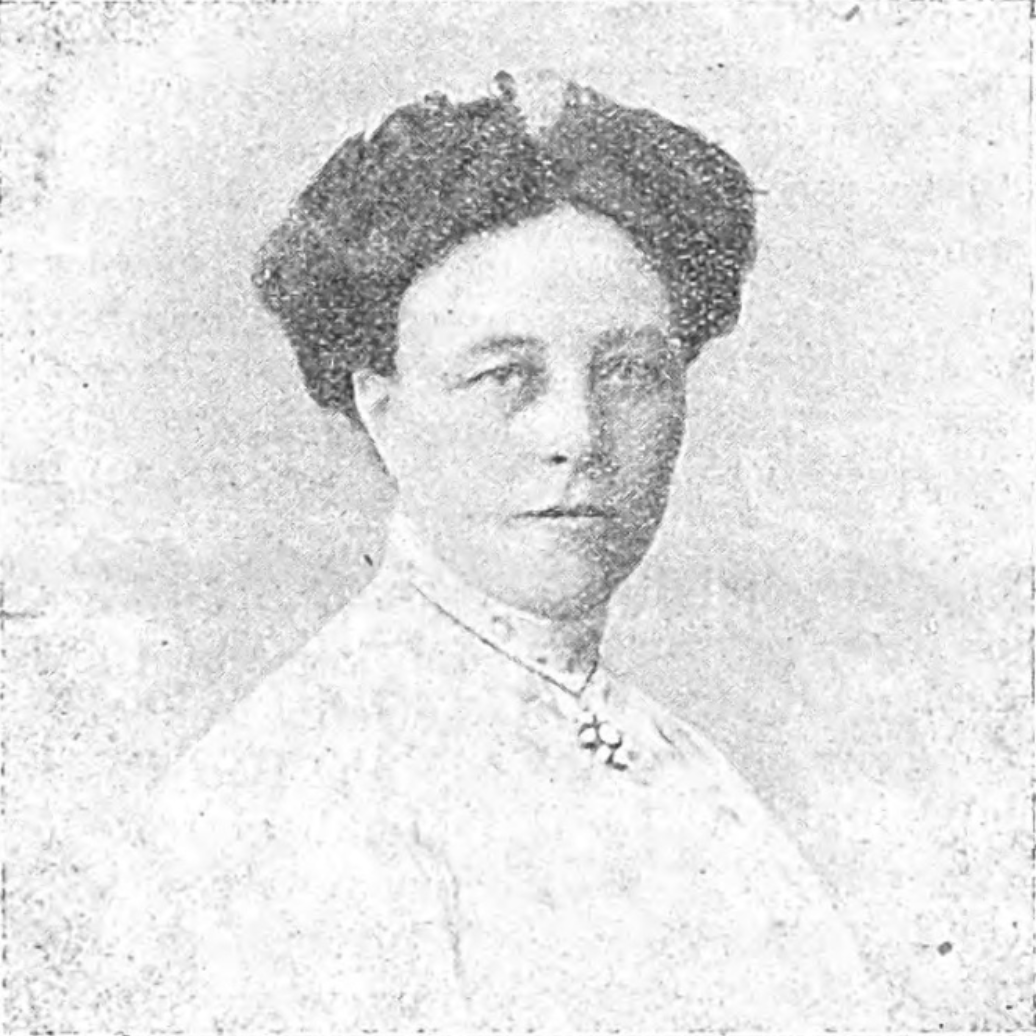
Elna Munch

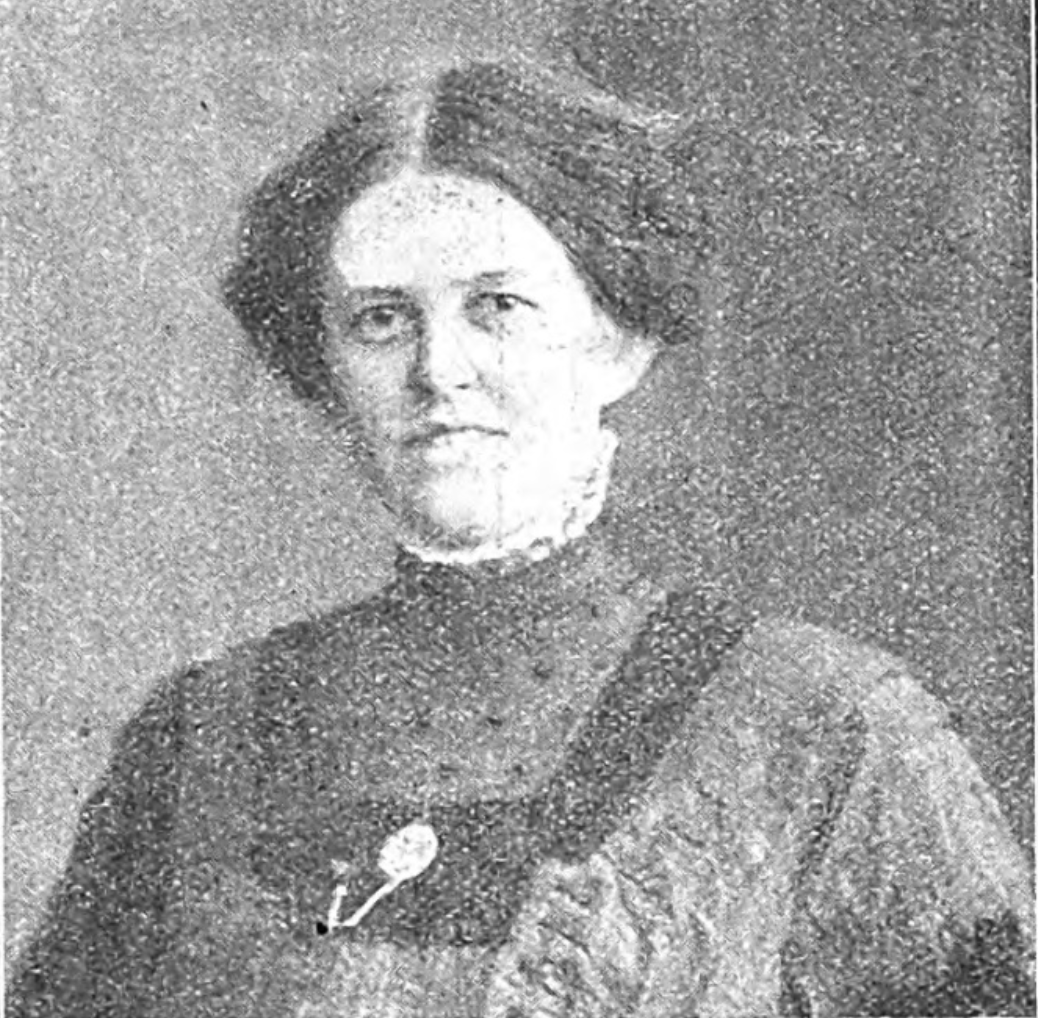
Fran Blauenfeldt

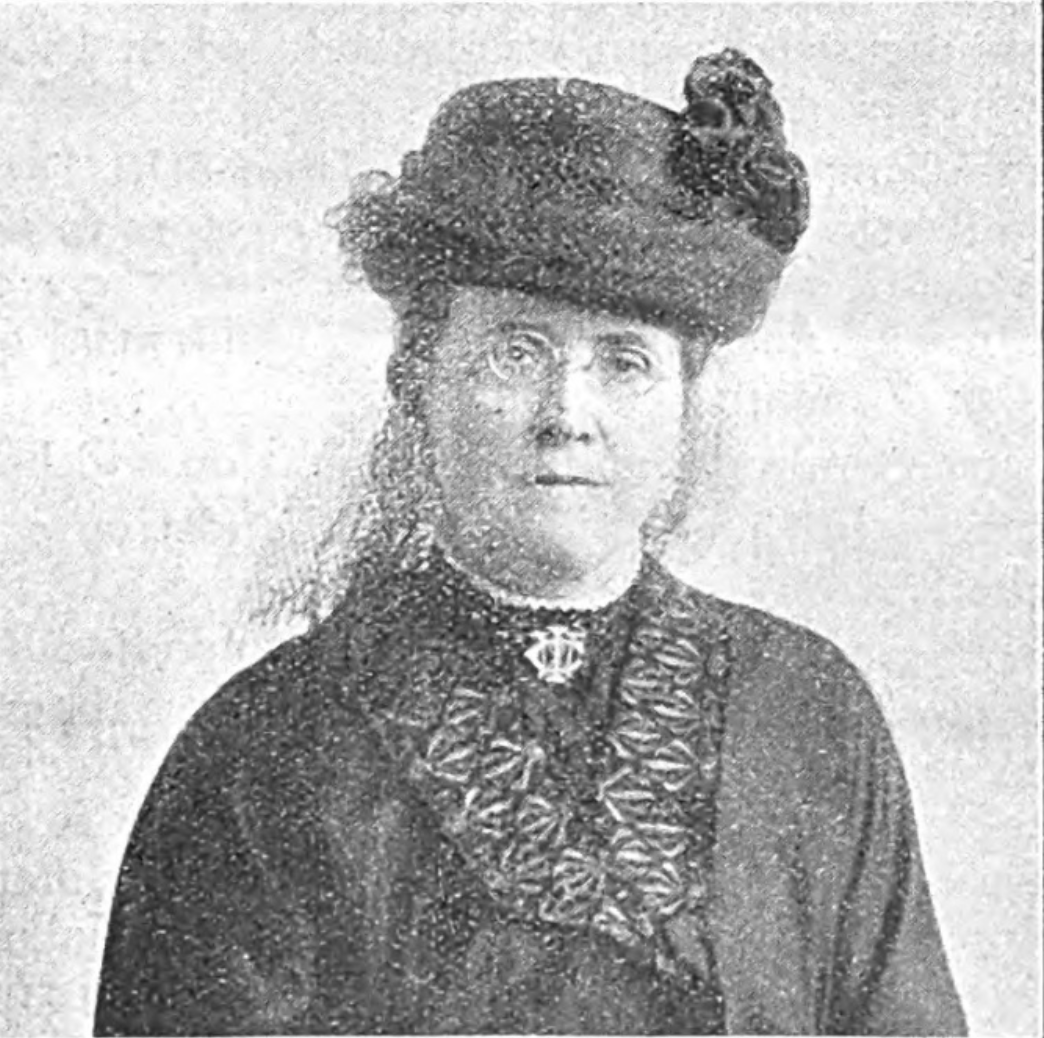
Henni Forchhammer

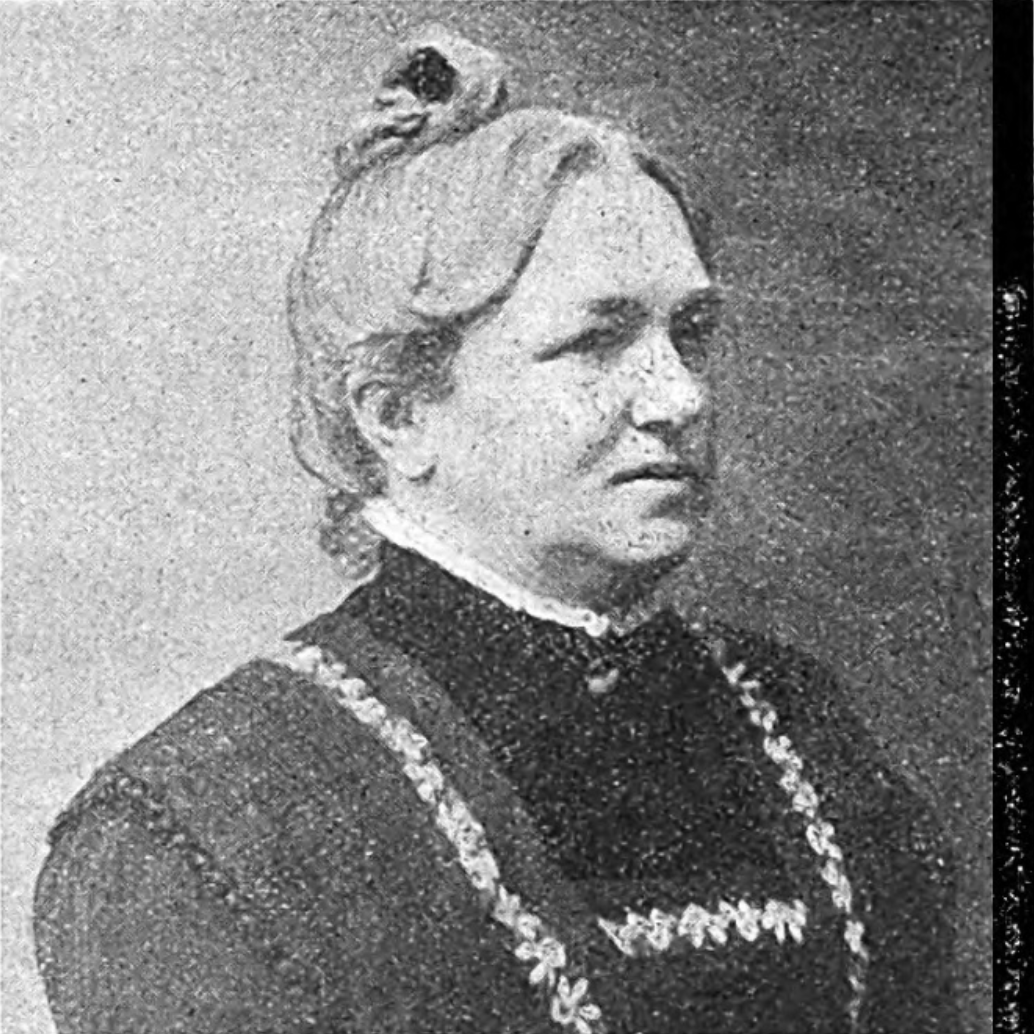
Johanne Rambusch

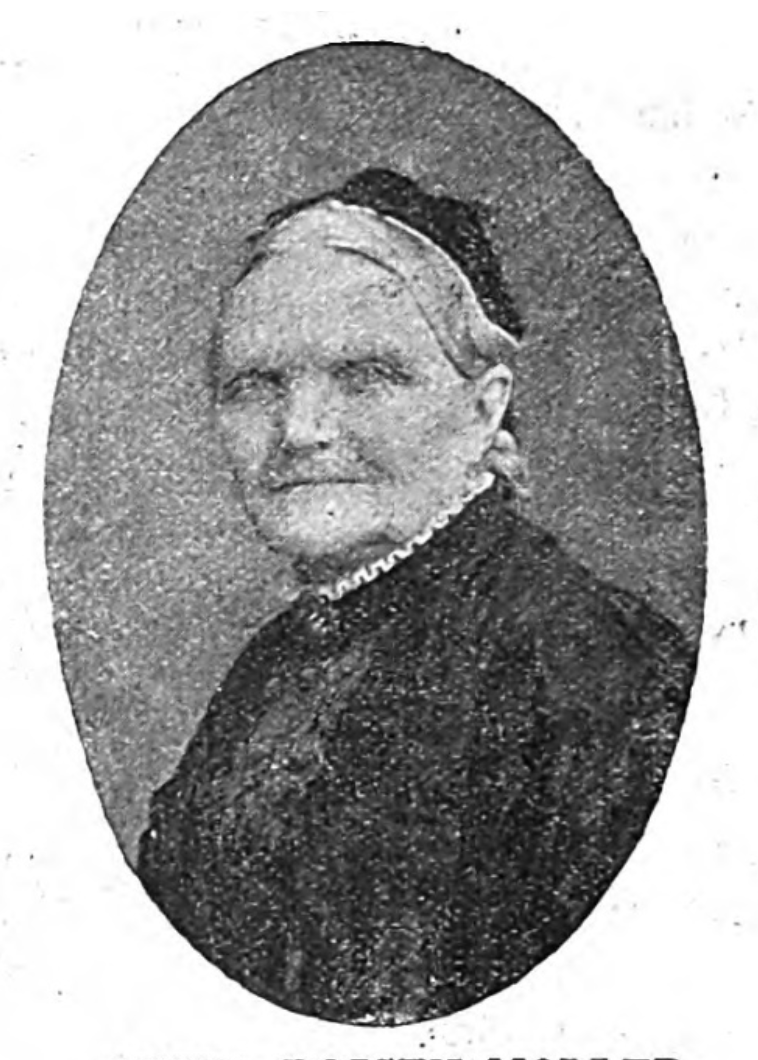
Jutta Bojsen-Møller

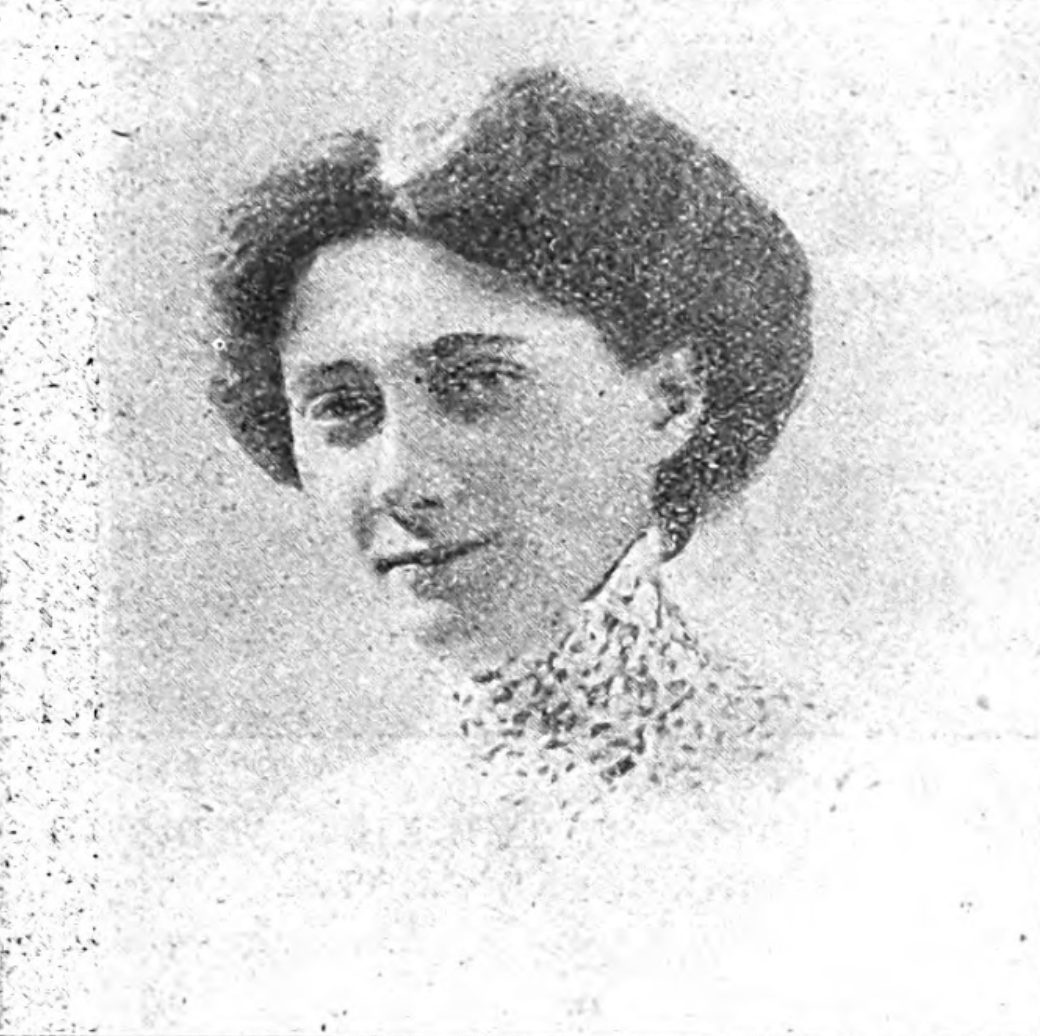
Thora Daugaard

== See also ==
- List of suffragists and suffragettes
- Timeline of women's suffrage
- Women in Denmark
