= Timeline of women in Denmark =

This is a timeline of women in Denmark, noting important events in Danish women's history.

== Timeline ==
=== 14th century ===
- 10 August 1387 – Margaret I of Denmark becomes the first woman to rule Denmark as a monarch: the first woman to rule Denmark was Margaret Sambiria as a regent in 1259.

=== 17th century ===
- 27 December 1675 – Abel Cathrines Stiftelse is founded by Abel Cathrine von der Wisch.

=== 19th century ===
- 24 February 1871 – The apolitical Danish Women's Society (Dansk Kvindesamfund) is founded by Matilde Bajer and her husband Fredrik Bajer.
- 1 October 1872 – Kvindelig Læseforening is founded at the initiative of Sophie Petersen.
- 1875 – The University of Copenhagen is opened to women students.
- 1885 The Women's Progress Association (Kvindelig Fremskridtsforening) was founded by Matilde Bajer and Elisabeth Ouchterlony.
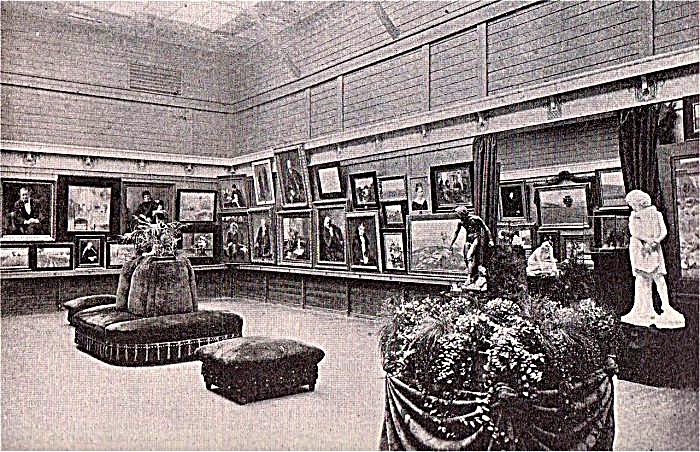
  Art display at the Nordic Women's Exhibition
- 1885 – Nielsine Nielsen becomes the first woman with a medical degree in Denmark.
- 1988 – The first women are accepted as students at the Royal Danish Academy of Fine Arts.
- 1890 – The Women's Council of Denmark (Kvinderådet) is established.
- 1895 – The Nordic Women's Exhibition (Kvindernes Udstilling fra Fortid og Nutid) takes place in Copenhagen.

=== 20th century ===
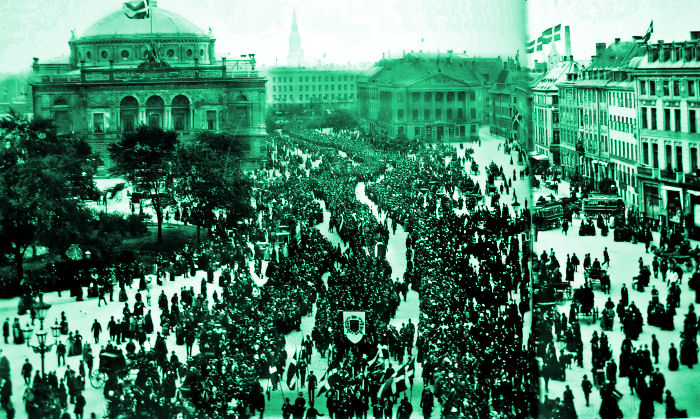
1915 Danish Women's March

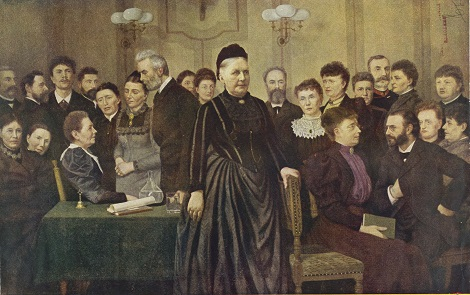
Line luplau seen in the foreground on her daughter Marie Luplau's large group portrait painting From the Early Days of the Fight for Women's Suffrage (1897)

- 1915 – The Danish Women's Peace Chain (Danske Kvinders Fredskæde) is founded as the Danish branch of the Women's International League for Peace and Freedom.
- 1915 – Women in Denmark gained the right to vote.
- 1918 – Four Danish women are elected to the Folketing: Karen Ankersted, Mathilde Malling Hauschultz, Helga Larsen and Elna Munch.
- 1920 – The Danish Housewives Association (De Danske Husmoderforeninger) is founded.
- 1924 – Nina Bang becomes the first female minister in an internationally recognized government when she is appointed Minister for Education.
- 1950 – Eva Madsen becomes mayor of Stege and the first female mayor in Denmark.
- 1955 – Bodil Begtrup becomes the first Denmark's first female ambassador when she was appointed ambassador to Iceland.
- 1964 – The Danish women's issues information center KVINFO is founded.
- 1970 – The Red Stocking Movement (Danish: Rødstrømpebevægelsen) in Denmark is established in 1970; it is active until the mid-1980s. Inspired by the Redstockings founded in 1969 in New York City, it brings together left-wing feminists who fight for the same rights as men in terms of equal pay but it also addresses treatment of women in the workplace as well as in the family.

=== 21st century ===
- 3 October 2011 – Helle Thorning-Schmidt becomes the first woman prime minister of Denmark.
- 30 September 2016 – Lone Træholt of the Royal Danish Air Force becomes Denmark's first woman general.
- 11 September 2017 – Jette Albinus becomes the first woman in the Royal Danish Army to hold the rank of general.
