= Women in Denmark =

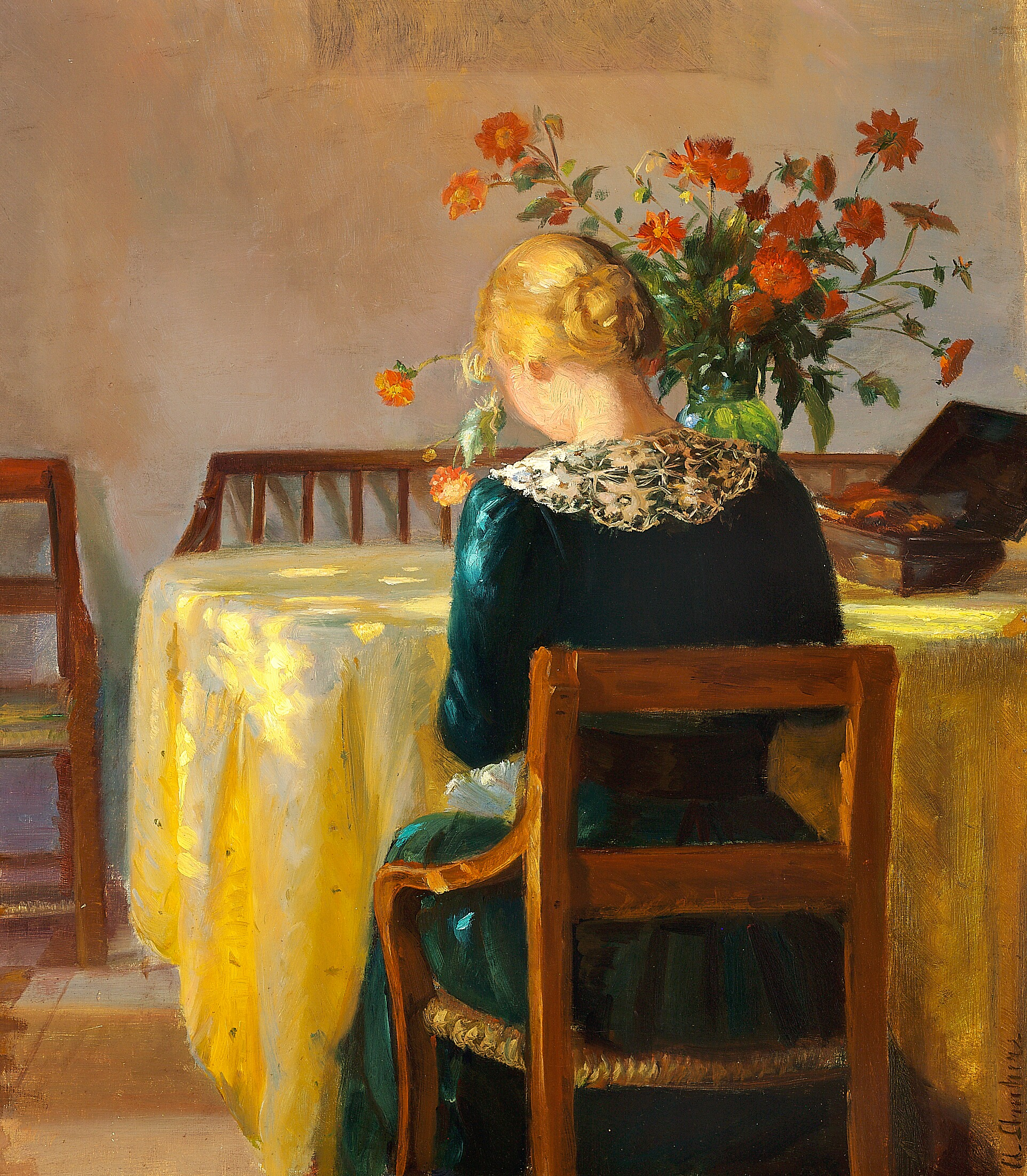
- Painting by Anna Ancher. Interior with the Painter's Daughter Helga Sewing, 1890

General statistics
- Women in parliament: 39.1% (2013)
- Women over 25 with secondary education: 95.5% (2012)
- Women in labour force: 70.4% (employment rate OECD definition, 2015)

Gender Inequality Index
- Value: 0.013 (2021)
- Rank: 1st out of 191

Global Gender Gap Index
- Value: 0.764 (2022)
- Rank: 32nd out of 146

The modern-day character and the historical status of women in Denmark has been influenced by their own involvement in women's movements and political participation in the history of Denmark. Their mark can be seen in the fields of politics, women's suffrage, and literature, among others.

== History ==
The legal, civilian, and cultural status of women in prehistoric society during the Stone Age, Bronze Age, and Iron Age in Scandinavia are somewhat obscure, but Viking Age sources indicate that women were relatively free, compared to men, contemporary societies, and the later Middle Ages.

With the gradual introduction of Catholicism in Scandinavia in the early Middle Ages, women's rights were increasingly regulated and restricted. During the Middle Ages, the legal rights of women in Denmark were regulated by the county laws, the Medieval Scandinavian law (landskabslovene) from the 13th century, and therefore varied somewhat between different counties. However, a married woman was generally under the guardianship of her spouse. Sons and daughters both had right to inheritance, though sisters inherited half of the portion of a brother.

The cities were regulated by the city laws. With the exception of widows, who inherited the right to the trade of her late spouse, women were not allowed membership in the guilds, which monopolized most professions in the cities. However, in practice, it was very common for women, whether married or not, to be granted dispensation to manage a minor business for the sake of her own support and become a købekone (businesswoman), a custom which continued until women were given the same rights as men within commerce in 1857.

The Civil Code of 1683, or Christian 5.s Danske Lov (also enacted in the Danish province of Norway as the Civil Code of 1687 or Christian Vs Norske Lov), defined all unmarried females, regardless of age, as minors under the guardianship of their closest male relative, and a married woman under the guardianship of her spouse, while only widows were of legal majority. This code was in effect until the 19th century: in 1857, unmarried women were given legal majority, while married women were given the same right in 1899.

Girls were included as pupils in the first attempt of a public elementary school system in 1739, though this attempt was not fully realized until 1814. From the foundation of the J. Cl. Todes Døtreskole in the 1780s, schools for secondary education for females were established in the capital of Copenhagen, though female teachers were only allowed to teach girls or very small boys. One of the first schools for females of any note was the Døtreskolen af 1791, and in the 1840s, schools for girls spread outside the capital and a net of secondary education girl schools was established in Denmark. The first college for women, the teachers seminary Den højere Dannelsesanstalt for Damer, was opened in 1846. In 1875, women were given access to university education. In the reformed law of access in 1921, women were formally given access to all professions and positions in society with the exception of some military and clerical positions and the position of judge (given in 1936).

== Women's movement ==
There have been two major periods of women's movement in Denmark. The first one was from 1870 to 1920. The second was from 1970 to 1985.

The first women's movement was led by the Dansk Kvindesamfund ('Danish Women's Society'). Line Luplau was one of the most notable women in this era. Tagea Brandt was also part of this movement, and in her honor was established Tagea Brandt Rejselegat or Travel Scholarship for women. The Dansk Kvindesamfund's efforts as a leading group of women for women led to the existence of the revised Danish constitution of 1915, giving women the right to vote and the provision of equal opportunity laws during the 1920s, which influenced the present-day legislative measures to grant women access to education, work, marital rights and other obligations.

Following the International Congress of Women held in The Hague in 1915, Danske Kvinders Fredskæde or the Danish Women's Peace Chain was established in Denmark. It called for women to provide more active support for peace once the First World War was over.

The second wave of women's movement was organized with the Rødstrømpebevægelsen (the Red Stocking movement). The effort led to "institutionalized feminism" (managed directly by the Danish government) and to the "mainstreaming of equal opportunities" between Danish men and women.

== Women's suffrage ==
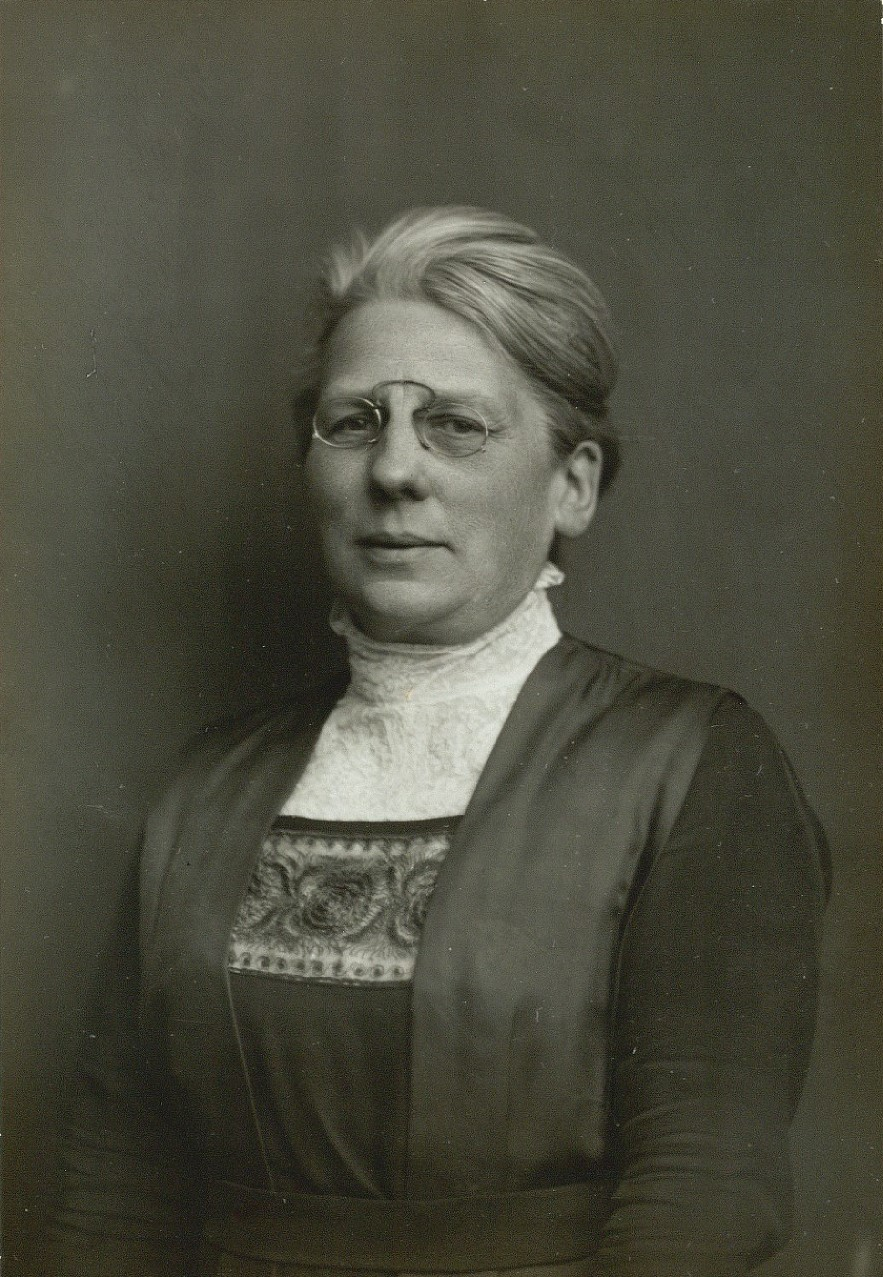
Nina Bang, the first female minister

Women in Denmark gained the right to vote on 5 June 1915.

The Danish Women's Society (DK) debated, and informally supported, women's suffrage from 1884, but it did not support it publicly until in 1887, when it supported the suggestion of the parliamentarian Fredrik Bajer to grant women municipal suffrage. In 1886, in response to the perceived overcautious attitude of DK in the question of women suffrage, Matilde Bajer founded the Kvindelig Fremskridtsforening (or KF, 1886–1904) to deal exclusively with the right to suffrage, both in municipal and national elections, and in 1887, the Danish women publicly demanded the right for women's suffrage for the first time through the KF. However, as the KF was very much involved with worker's rights and pacifist activity, the question of women's suffrage was in fact not given full attention, which led to the establishment of the strictly women's suffrage movement Kvindevalgretsforeningen (1889–1897). In 1890, the KF and the Kvindevalgretsforeningen united with five women's trade worker's unions to found the De samlede Kvindeforeninger, and through this form, an active women's suffrage campaign was arranged through agitation and demonstration. However, after having been met by compact resistance, the Danish suffrage movement almost discontinued with the dissolution of the De samlede Kvindeforeninger in 1893.

In 1898, an umbrella organization, the Danske Kvindeforeningers Valgretsforbund or DKV was founded and became a part of the International Woman Suffrage Alliance (IWSA). In 1907, the Landsforbundet for Kvinders Valgret (LKV) was founded by Elna Munch, Johanne Rambusch and Marie Hjelmer in reply to what they considered to be the much too careful attitude of the Danish Women's Society. The LKV originated from a local suffrage association in Copenhagen, and like its rival LKV, it successfully organized other such local associations nationally.

Women won the right to vote in municipal elections on April 20, 1908. However it was not until June 5, 1915, that they were allowed to vote in Rigsdag elections.

== Parliamentary appointments and elections ==
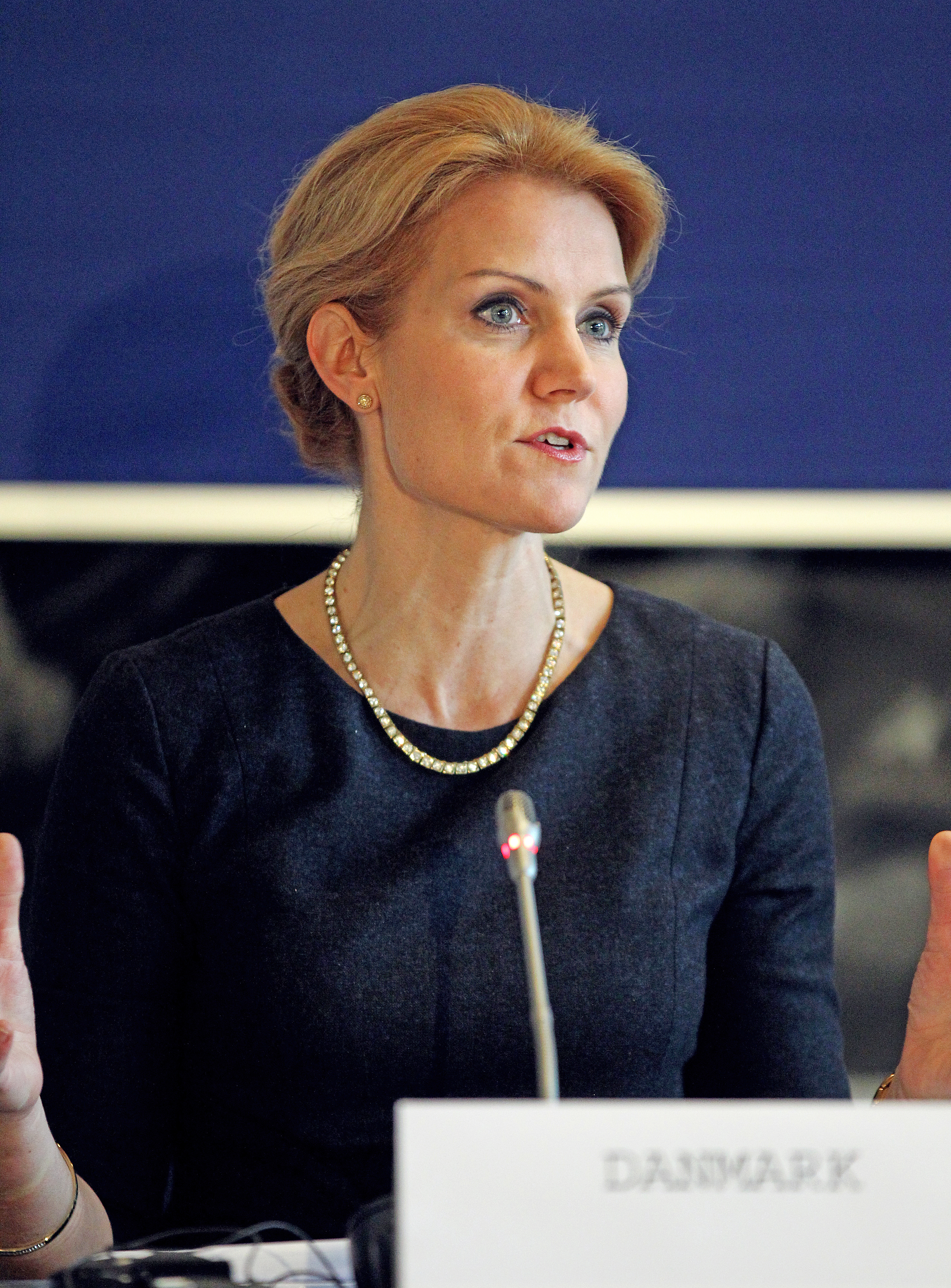
Helle Thorning-Schmidt, Prime Minister of Denmark from 2011 to 2015

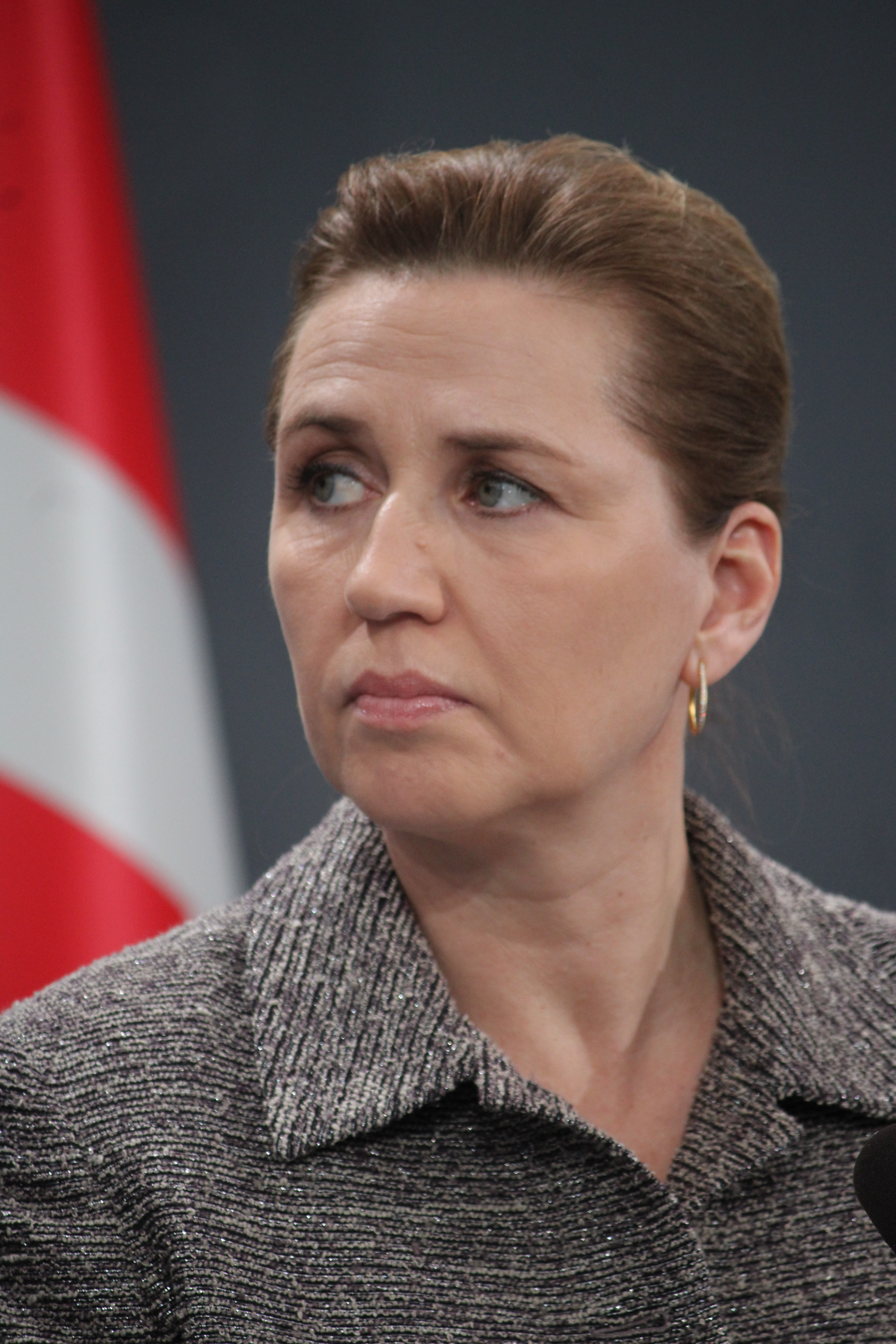
Mette Frederiksen, the current prime minister of Denmark

In 1918, a total of twelve Danish women were elected to the Danish parliament. Four of those women were elected to the Lower House (known as the Folketinget), while eight Danish women were elected to the Upper House (known as the Landstinget). In 1924, Nina Bang became the first female minister of Denmark, making Denmark the second country in the world to have a female minister. Jytte Andersen served as Minister of Employment from 1993 to 1998. Anderson was later appointed in 1998 as Senior Minister for Construction and Housing. In 1999, Andersen was appointed as the first Danish Minister on Gender Equality in 1999.

A second female minister in Denmark was elected twenty years later (counting from 1924). Subsequently, the percentage of female members in governments of Denmark, has generally increased, and in 2000 it was at its highest with 45%.

The first female mayor in Denmark was Eva Madsen who became mayor of Stege in 1950, and the first female head of state (statsminister) was Helle Thorning-Schmidt, who became prime minister in 2011. Mette Frederiksen is Denmark's current prime minister since the election in June 2019.

== Family life ==
Percentage of births to unmarried women, in selected countries, including Denmark, 1980 and 2007. By 1980, Denmark already had a high percentage (compared to most other countries) of births outside of marriage

The Danish culture is largely irreligious, in particular when it comes to religious dogmas, and this is also reflected in the everyday social life, including family culture. As in many other Western countries, the connection between childbirth and marriage has thus been significantly weakened since the latter half of the 20th century. As of 2016, 54% of births were to unmarried women. During the 1960s and 70s, Denmark was one of the first European countries to change its social norms towards accepting unmarried cohabitation and childbearing, at a time when this was still seen as unacceptable in many other parts of the continent.

== Reproductive rights and sexuality ==
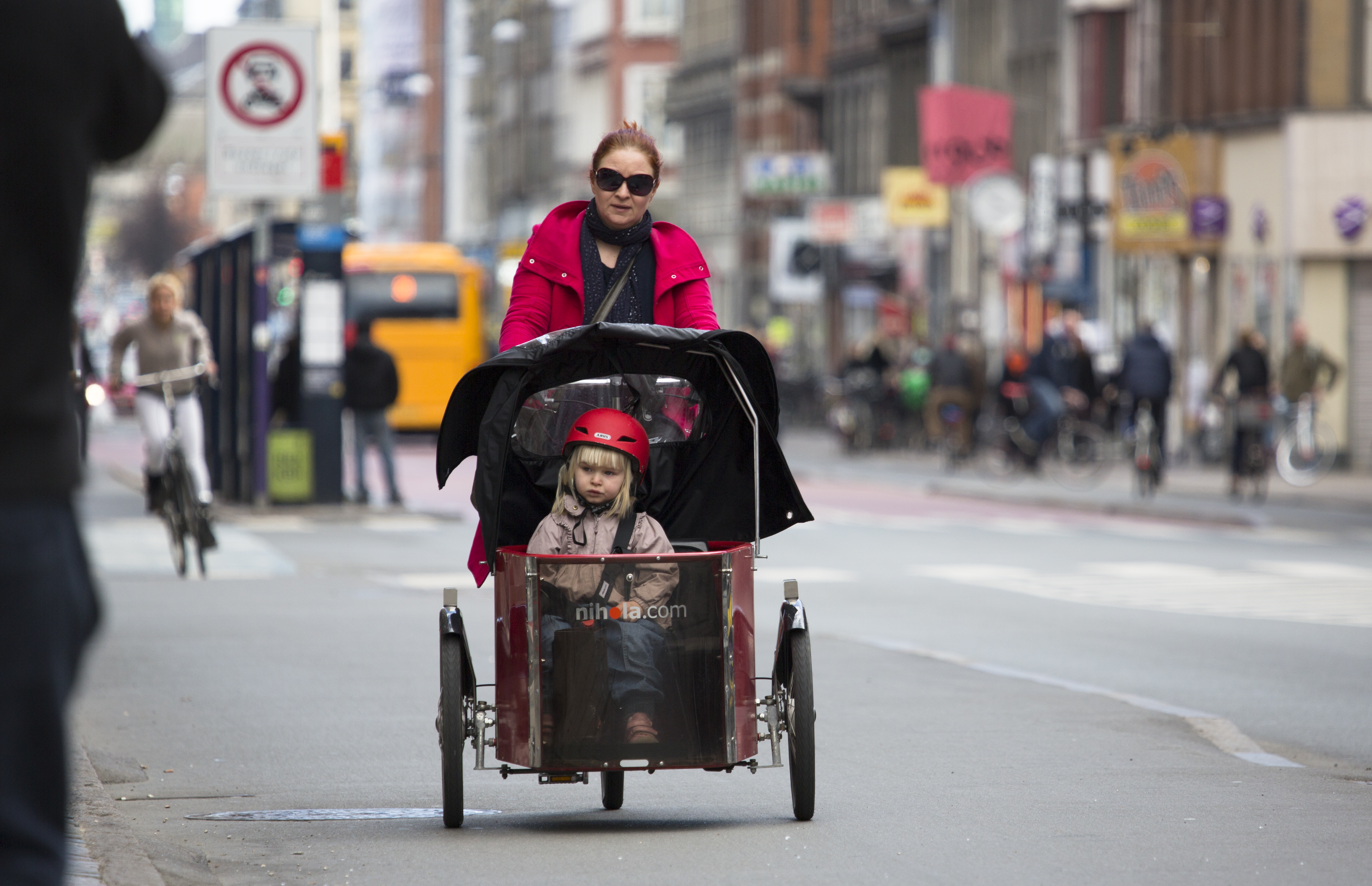
Woman with child in Copenhagen

The maternal mortality rate in Denmark is 12 deaths per 100,000 live births (as of 2010). Although this is low by international standards, it is higher than in many other Western countries, and it has increased in recent years.

Abortion laws were liberalized in 1973, allowing the procedure to be done on-demand during the first 12 weeks, and in specific circumstances at later stages of the pregnancy.

Denmark's HIV/AIDS rate is 0.2% of adults (aged 15–49) as of 2009.

The total fertility rate (TFR) in Denmark is 1.73 children born per woman (2014 estimates), which, although below the replacement rate, is one of the highest in Europe.

Denmark provides for sex education in schools. The age of consent in Denmark is 15.

Denmark has a reputation of being "open" with regards to sexuality, perhaps due to historical factors, such as being the first country to abolish censorship and legalize pornography in 1967. However, today the Danish pornography industry is minimal compared to many other countries, with large-scale production of pornography having moved to other countries.

== Violence against women ==
The issues of violence against women and domestic violence are controversial; according to a 2014 study published by the European Union Agency for Fundamental Rights, Denmark had the highest prevalence rate of physical and sexual violence against women in Europe. Denmark has also received harsh criticism for inadequate laws in regard to sexual violence in a 2008 report produced by Amnesty International, which described Danish laws as "inconsistent with international human rights standards". This led to Denmark reforming its sexual offenses legislation in 2013. Denmark has also ratified the Convention on preventing and combating violence against women and domestic violence. A 2010 Eurobarometer poll on violence against women found that victim blaming attitudes used to be common in Denmark: 71% of Danes agreed with the assertion that the "provocative behaviour of women" was a cause of violence against women, well above the 52% European average. According to the 2016 report, 13% of respondents agree that sexual intercourse without consent can be justified in certain situations. A 2019 poll found that the vast majority of Danes are aware of the seriousness of domestic abuse, with more than 86% of respondents rating multiple forms of violence against women as "very serious".

The GREVIO Evaluation Report of the Convention on preventing and combating violence against women and domestic violence, to which Denmark is a party, expressed concern about the lenient punishments given to perpetrators of violence against women, stating that (page 68, paragraph 38): "Moreover, GREVIO encourages the Danish authorities to ensure understanding among the Danish judiciary that lenient sentences in domestic violence cases and other forms of violence against women do not serve the principle of ensuring justice for victims and ending impunity of perpetrators (paragraph 182)."

== Notable Danish women ==
=== Suffrage and politics ===
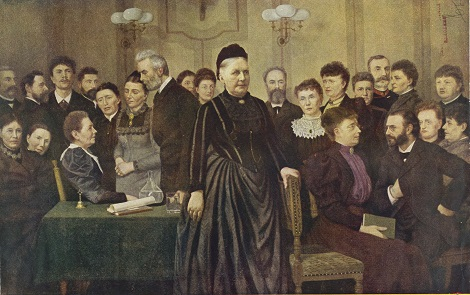
Line luplau seen in the foreground on her daughter Marie Luplau's large group portrait painting From the Early Days of the Fight for Women's Suffrage (1897).

Among notable female Danes was Matilde Bajer, who – together with her husband Fredrik Bajer – founded the Danish Women's Society in 1871, one of the oldest women's rights organizations in the world. Another notable Danish woman was Lise Nørgaard (born 1917), a Danish author and journalist during the 1930s and the 1940s. She authored the autobiographical books such as the Kun en pige ('Just a Girl', 1992) and De sendte en dame ('They Sent a Lady', 1993). Another notable Danish woman was Line Luplau, who achieved national fame in 1887 when she supported the cause to grant women to vote during local elections.

=== Literature ===
In literature, one of the most notable female literary writers in Denmark was Karen Blixen (1885–1962). She was also known by the pseudonyms Isak Dinesen and Tania Blixen. Blixen was the author of the Seven Gothic Tales (1934), a collection of short stories, which she wrote at the age of 49.

=== Women pioneers ===
This lists firsts for women in Denmark in different areas in chronological order. See also: Timeline of women in Denmark

- First female civil servant: Mathilde Fibiger (as the first female telegraph operator, she was counted as a civil servant), 1866
- First female university students: Johanne Gleerup and Nielsine Nielsen, 1877
- First female medical doctor: Nielsine Nielsen, 1885
- First female jurist: Nanna Berg, 1887
- First female dentist: Nicoline Møller, 1888
- First female pharmacists: Charlotte Schou and Nielsine Schousen, 1896
- First female engineers: Agnes Klingberg and Betzy Meyer, 1897
- First female member of parliament: Mathilde Malling Hauschultz, 1918
- First female city council member: Nina Bang, 1918
- First female government minister: Nina Bang, 1924
- First female judge: Karen Johnsen, 1939
- First female mayor: Eva Madsen, 1950
- First female ambassador: Bodil Begtrup, 1955
- First female fighter pilot: Line Bonde, 2006
- First female general: Lone Træholt, 2016
- Physicist who pioneered the use of Bose-Einstein condensates in slowing and stopping light: Lene Hau

== See also ==
- List of Danish suffragists
- Danish Center for Research on Women and Gender (KVINFO)
- Danish Women's Society
- Kvindemuseet
- List of Danes
- The Danish Girl, a novel
- Timeline of women in Denmark
- Women in Europe
