= Estrid Hein =

Danish ophthalmologist, women's rights activist and pacifist

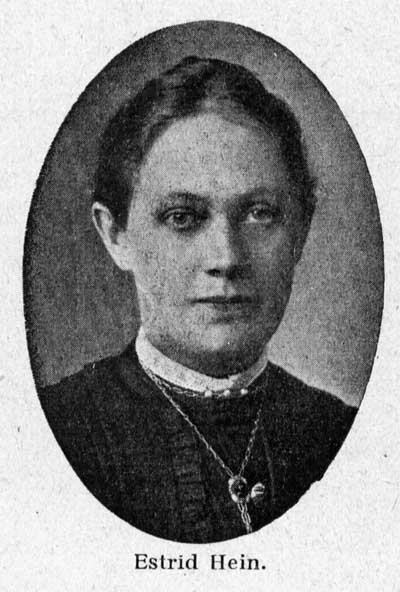
Estrid Hein (1915)

Estrid Hein (née Hansen; 27 July 1873 – 25 July 1956) was a Danish ophthalmologist, women's rights activist and pacifist. She practised in Copenhagen from 1898, opening her own clinic in 1906. She was also a prominent figure in the women's movement, chairing the Copenhagen chapter of the Danish Women's Society (Dansk Kvindesamfund) from 1909, later serving on the society's central board. In 1915, she became an active member of Danske Kvinders Fredskæde (DKF), the Danish arm of the Women's International League for Peace and Freedom. The same year she joined the Scandinavian Family Law Commission where she was effective in furthering progress on women rights as spouses. From 1933 she participated on the executive board of Denmark's Women's Council (Danske Kvinders Nationalråd).

== Early life and education ==
Born on 27 July 1873 in Copenhagen, Estrid Hansen was the daughter of the politician Octavius Thomas Hansen (1838–1903) and of Ida Antoinette Wulff (1845–1924), who was known for her needlework. Brought up in a well-to-do bourgeois home, she came into contact with prominent political and cultural figures during her childhood. After matriculating from N. Zahle's School in 1890, she studied medicine at the University of Copenhagen, graduating in 1896. That September, she married the engineer Hjalmar Hein (1871–1922). She went on to spend a year in Paris studying physiological optics, followed by study trips to clinics in Britain, the Netherlands, Austria and Germany.

== Professional life ==
Back in Copenhagen, she began to practise in 1898, opening her own clinic in 1906 where she attracted many satisfied clients. In 1918, she received her specialist certificate and continued to practise until her retirement in 1939.

Hein was also active in the women's movement, becoming a medical specialist in Kvindernes Handels- og Kontoristforening (Women's Trades and Office Workers Association) and serving on the board of Louiseforeningen (the Louise Society) which was established to alleviate poverty among destitute single women. In 1914, she became the first woman to serve on the board of Blindeinstituttet (the Blind Institute).

From 1909 to 1916, Hein was chair of the Copenhagen branch of the Danish Women's Society where she was one of the most popular figures in the organization. She successfully campaigned for equal rights for women in regard to both voting rights and factory law. In 1915, together with Thora Daugaard, Clara Tybjerg, Benny Cederfeld de Simonsen and Henni Forchhammer, she became an early member of Danske Kvinders Fredskæde, the Danish branch of the Women's International League for Peace and Freedom. The same year, she joined the Scandinavian Family Law Commission which worked successfully on improving women's rights in marriage with the 1920 marriage reforms in Denmark.

Hein was part of a commission put together by the Social Democrat party on sterilization of the mentally handicapped. This commission published its report in 1926, under the title Betcenkning Angaende Sociale Foranstaltninger Overfor Degenerativt Bestemte Personer (Social measures toward Degeneratively Predisposed Individuals). The conclusion of the committee was that sterilization was justified in some cases of institutionalizations, that castration should be reserved for repeat sexual offenders, and left a lot of details of implementation to local physicians and administrators of institutions.

Hein was also active in Den danske Komité til Bekæmpelse af den hvide Slavehandel which was established to combat white slave trade. She also played a leading role in the League of Nations' Advisory Committee on the Fight against Trafficking in Women and Children where she was a delegate for 18 years. From 1933, she was a board member of the National Women's Council.

Estrid Hansen died in Hørsholm on 25 July 1956.

== See also ==
- List of peace activists
