= Benny Cederfeld de Simonsen =

Danish peace activist

Benny Sophie Caroline Andrea Cederfeld de Simonsen née Treschow (1865–1952) was a Danish peace activist. She is remembered as an effective member of Danske Kvinders Fredskæde, the Danish branch of the Women's International League for Peace and Freedom (WILPF), later known as Kvindernes Internationale Liga for Fred og Frihed (KILFF). From 1931 to 1939, she was the organization's vice-president. She was an active participant at the international WILPF conferences from 1926 to 1937 as well as a member of their international committee where she dealt with the rights of minorities.

== Early life and education ==
Born on 2 October 1865 in Brahesborg, a manor house near Assens on the island of Funen, Benny Sophie Caroline Andrea Treschow was the daughter of the estate owner Carl Adolph Rothe Treschow (1839–1924) and Sophie Margrethe Elisabeth Rantzau (1844–1911). She was brought up in a prominent noble household, receiving her education at home from private tutors brought in from abroad. As a result, she was able to converse fluently in French, English and German. In 1892, she married Hans Christian Frederik Wilhelm Cederfeld de Simonsen (1866–1938), also an affluent estate owner on Funen. Thereafter she moved into his Erholm manor.

== Role as a peace activist ==
Struck by the hostilities of the First World War, in 1916 Cederfeld de Simonsen joined the peace organization Danske Kvinders Fredskæde, becoming the head of its Funen chapter in 1919. In 1925, participating in the annual meeting of the Dansk Fredsforening (DF) or Danish Peace Society, she stood up against the society's criticism of the KILFF. DF, founded in 1882 by Fredrik Bajer, considered the KILFF a rival, believing that all Danish peace organizations should come under its control. Together with Clara Tybjerg and Henriette Beenfeldt, Cederfeld de Simonsen maintained that it could only help if there were two organizations in Denmark striving for peace as they could extend there interests more widely.

Cederfeld de Simonsen was particularly effective in increasing membership of the Funen chapter of the KILFF, making it by far the largest local organization with 4,000 members. Before the German occupation of Denmark, in March 1940 she was particularly effective in liaising between the Danske Kvinders Nationalråd (Women's Council of Denmark) and the Danish Jewish women's society Jødisk Kvindeforening. Her efforts resulted in 320 Jewish children from central Europe being brought to Denmark to be cared for in Danish homes.

Maintaining her interest in the peace movement for the rest of her life, Benny Cederfeld de Simonsen died in Copenhagen on 16 January 1952.

== See also ==
- List of peace activists
