= Dansk Fredsforening =

Danish peace organization

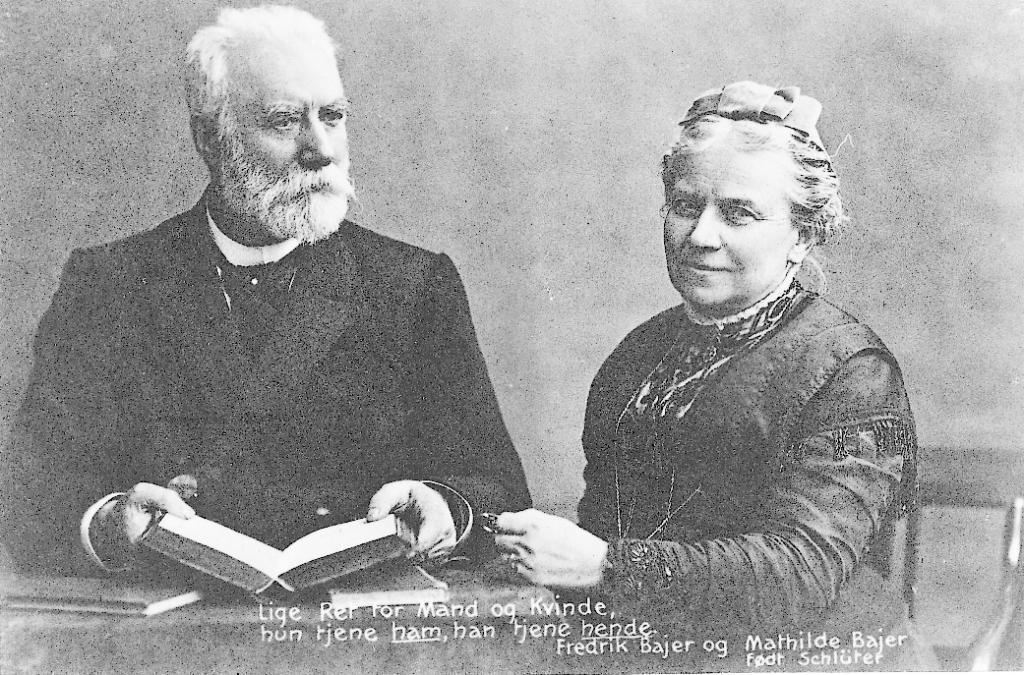
Frederik Bajer, founder of the organization, together with his wife Matilde

Dansk Fredsforening or the Danish Peace Society was founded by Fredrik Bajer in 1882 when it was initially called Foreningen til Danmarks Neutralisering (Society for Denmark's Neutralization). It called for an international arbitration tribunal to resolve conflicts as a means of avoiding war. As a result of the Conservative's support for defence, it appealed to many Liberals who had campaigned against warfare. The Society underwent significant growth in the 1890s, leading to two petitions with a total of 533,000 signatures and a series of peace demonstrations.

The organization was based on three priorities: Denmark should be neutral; arbitration treaties should be concluded with like-minded nations; and, in accordance with the principle of self-determination, a peaceful solution should be found for the Schleswig question. The organization attracted wide interest. By around 1900, the organization had some 10,000 members. By 1905, it had 73 branches.

After Denmark joined the League of Nations, the name was changed to Dansk Freds- og Folkeforbundsforening (Danish Peace and League of Nations Society) and when the country joined the United Nations, the name became Dansk FN-Forening (Danish UNO Society).

There were several active women members of the organization, including Matilde Bajer, Henriette Beenfeldt, Henni Forchhammer, Eline Hansen, Johanne Meyer and Louise Nørlund.

== See also ==
- Danske Kvinders Fredskæde
- List of anti-war organizations
- List of peace activists
