= Karen Ankersted =

Pioneering Danish female politician

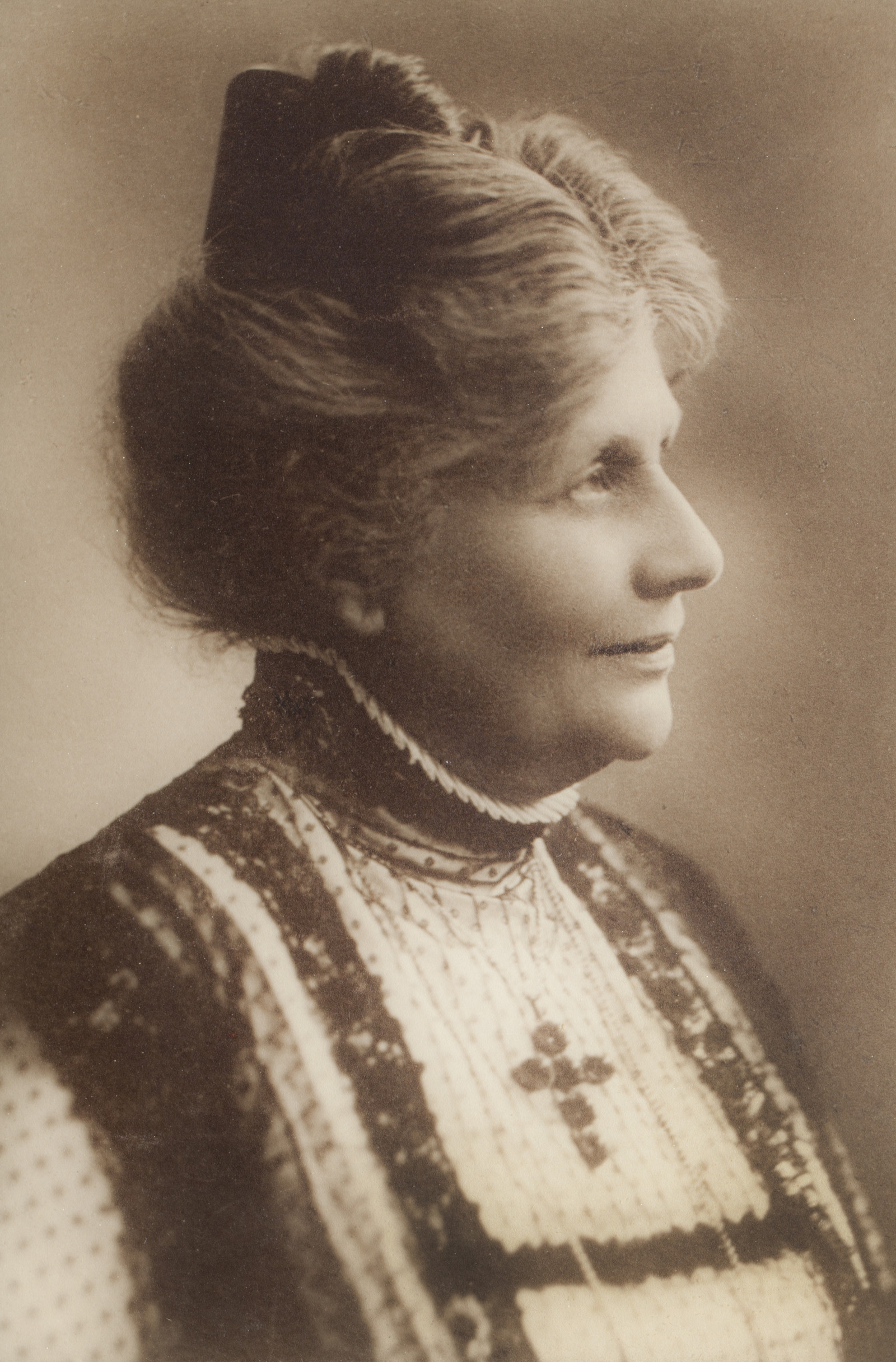
Karen Ankersted

Karen Marie Ankersted Hansen (1859–1921) was a Danish teacher and a pioneering female politician. She was among the first four women to be elected to the Municipal Council of Frederiksberg in 1909 as well as one of the first three to be elected to the Folketing (the Danish national parliament) in 1918.

== Biography ==
Born on 18 July 1859 in Ishøj, Karen Marie Ankersted Hansen was the daughter of the farmer Niels Hansen (died 1885) and Marie Nielsen (c.1822–1869). She was brought up in Copenhagen by a foster mother, Hanne Kopp, who was a teacher. After attending Testrup Folk High School, she trained to be a private teacher at N. Zahle's School, receiving her diploma in 1881.

From 1883 to 1888, she taught at Borgerdyd School in Christianshavn, gradually gaining admission to the Copenhagen Municipality's schools authority. As a result, she taught at Gasværksvejen School and Haderslevgade School until 1916 when declining health forced her to leave.

Although rather conservative in her outlook, Ankersted was a supporter of women's rights but did not campaign with the activists. By contrast, she played an active part in Copenhagen Municipality's Teachers Association on its establishment in 1891, becoming its chair for two periods (1905–1906 and 1910–1912). She also became active in the Women's Council.

On the political front, she was a conservative, becoming a member of the Højre party which in 1915 became the Conservative People's Party. On 1 April 1909, she was elected to the Municipal Council of Frederiksberg where she remained until 11 November 1918.

Standing for Aarhus, Anhersted was elected to the Folketing in the 1918 elections, the first time women had been able to participate. She was one of four women who were elected, the others — all standing for Copenhagen — were Helga Larsen (Social Democrats), Elna Munch (Social Liberals) and Mathilde Malling Hauschultz (Conservative People's Party).

She was not re-elected in the April 1920 election but only left the Rigsdag until the following August when she entered the Landsting for her last few months. Karen Ankersted died in Copenhagen on 6 November 1921.
