= Eline Hansen =

Danish feminist and peace leader

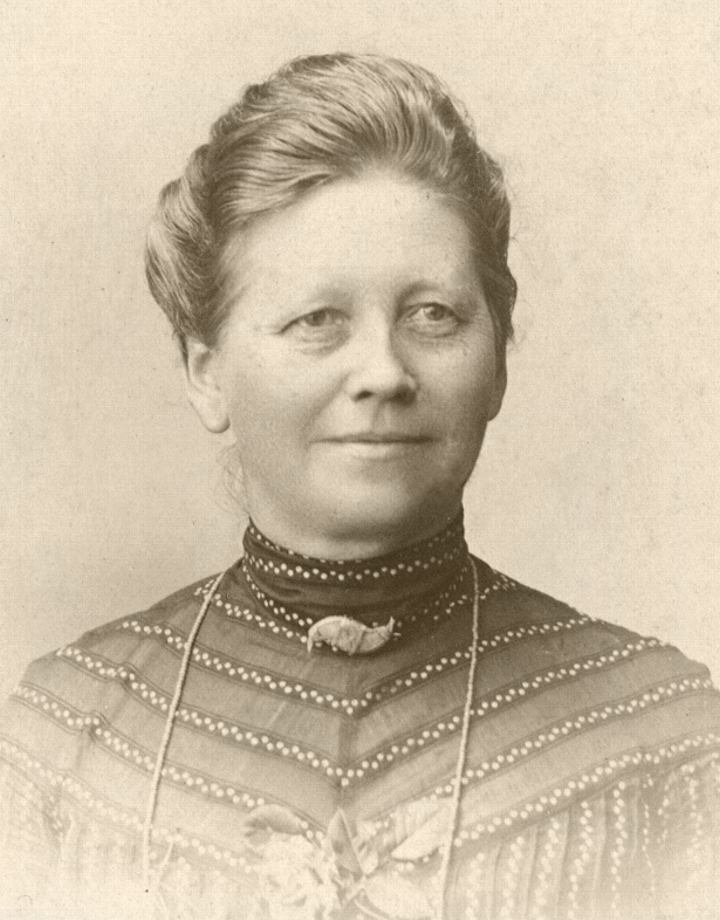
- Eline Hansen c. 1916
- Born: Eline Johanne Frederikke Hansen; 22 October 1859; Assens, Denmark
- Died: 6 January 1919 (aged 59); Copenhagen, Denmark
- Occupations: Educator, Suffragists
- Known for: co-founding Danske Kvinders Nationalråd and Danske Kvinders Fredskæde

Eline Johanne Frederikke Hansen (22 October 1859 – 6 January 1919), was a Danish feminist and peace leader.

== Biography ==
Hansen was born 22 October 1859 in Assens, the daughter of Christian Jacob Hansen (1832–1880) and Johanne Margrethe Rasmussen (1822–1891). From 1876 to 1877 she was a student at N. Zahles privatlærerindekursus for governesses in Copenhagen; she graduated as a teacher in 1883 and worked as one at Aarhus højere Pigeskole from 1884 to 1889, and at the public schools in Copenhagen from 1889 to 1910.

Hansen became interested in gender equality as a student, and during her career as a teacher she worked for equality between male and female students and teachers. Hansen became a pioneer in Denmark as a school kitchen inspector, when she was educated in this profession in Norway at the expense of the Danish government and employed as such in Copenhagen in 1897. In 1898, she petitioned the government with a demand to start professional university courses for cooks at school kitchens, which was granted and enacted in 1899. She herself became a teacher at this course.

Hansen was a member of the Copenhagen School Direction from 1904 to 1910 and chairperson of the Copenhagen Public School Teachers' Association from 1905 to 1909. In 1908, she successfully managed to raise the salary for female teachers.

Hansen was an important member of the Danish women's movement. In 1886 she co-founded the local Århus chapter of the women's organisation Dansk Kvindesamfund (DK) and later became an intermediary between the Århus and Copenhagen chapters. She was a member of the central committee of the DK from 1893 to 1903, and alongside chairperson Jutta Bojsen-Møller is credited with preserving the DK in a difficult period of division in the Danish women's movement. In 1899, she co-founded the Dansk Kvinderaad, later Danske Kvinders Nationalråd (DKN). From 1915 to 1916, she arranged demonstrations for poor housewives. She functioned as an interpreter at the International Woman Suffrage Alliance’s congress in Copenhagen in 1906. During World War I, she did a great deal of work to forge and maintain links between German and British women, and in 1915, she was a delegate at the international women's peace conference in The Hague. Upon her return, she co-founded the peace movement Danske Kvinders Fredskæde, later Kvindernes Internationale Liga for Fred og Frihed, with Thora Daugaard, Clara Tybjerg, Louise Wright and Eva Moltesen. She was also active in the struggle for women's suffrage, and chairperson of one of the Danish suffrage movements. In 1918, the first election after women's suffrage, she was nominated for parliament, but was not elected.

Hansen died on 6 January 1919 in Copenhagen.

== See also ==
- List of peace activists
