= Meta Hansen =

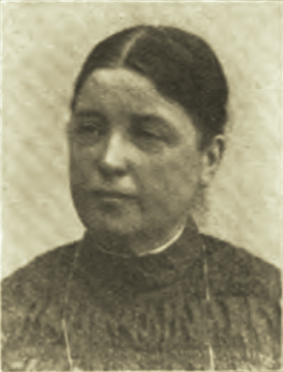
Hansen in 1909

Meta Kristine Hansen (1865–1941) was a Danish women's rights activist and politician. In 1893, she became the first woman to graduate in political science from the University of Copenhagen. She co-founded Denmark's Political Women's Association (Politisk Kvindeforening) in 1904, later chairing it when it became the Copenhagen Women's Suffrage Association (Københavns Kvindevalgretsforening). From 1907, she served as secretary of the National Association for Women's Suffrage, writing articles in the organization's magazine Kvindevalgret. Hansen was also a board member of the Danish Women's Society from 1906 to 1924. Representing the Danish Social Liberal Party, she was a candidate for Frederiksberg's Municipal Council in 1917 but was not elected.

== Biography ==
Born on 22 December 1865 in Asminderød near Fredensborg, Meta Kristine Hansen was the daughter of the farmer Hans Hansen (1815–1885) and his wife Ida Kristine Jensine Vilhelmine née Nørgaard (1832–1889), a mid-wife. Brought up in a non-academic environment, she followed a normal education until she attended N. Zahle's School in Copenhagen where she decided to study political science at the university. As a result, she became the first woman to graduate in political science in 1893. It was not until 1900 that another woman, Anna Marie Sveistrup, graduated in the same subject.

Despite her qualification, she was employed simply as an assistant in the Danish Statistics Bureau, unable to attain the status of an official civil servant (embedsmand) until the rules were changed in 1921. In the meantime, 13 of her male colleagues were promoted above her before she became an embedsmand herself, after a delay of 20 years.

Hansen was highly active in the fight for women's voting rights. She was a board member of Politisk Kvindeforening (Political Women's Association) from its establishment in 1904. After it became Københavns Kvindevalgretsforening, she chaired the organization from 1907 to 1915. From 1905, she was a board member of Danske Kvinders Nationalråd until women obtained the vote in 1915. She then became a member of the Danish Social Liberal Party, which she represented in 1917 as a candidate for Frederiksberg's Municipal Council but was not elected.

Meta Hansen died in Hillerød on 4 June 1941 and was buried in Asminderød Churchyard.
