= Henriette Crone =

Danish trade unionist, politician and peace activist

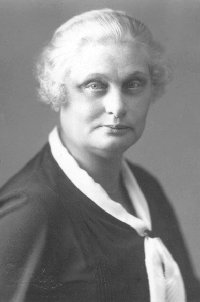
Henriette Crone

Thora Elise Henriette Crone (1874–1933) was a working-class Danish trade unionist, social democrat politician and peace activist. From 1898, she was a member of the women's print workers union (Kvindelige Trykkeriarbejderes Fagforening), becoming president in 1906. She was an early member of Danske Kvinders Fredskæde, established in 1915 as the Danish branch of Women's International League for Peace and Freedom. In 1920, she was elected to the national legislature (Landstinget) where she remained for the rest of her life.

== Early life ==
Born on 5 February 1874 in Bakkendrup near Kalundborg in northwestern Zealand, Thora Elise Henriette Crone was the daughter of the village blacksmith Lars Peder Crone (1832–88) and his wife Karen Sofie née Kristensen (1840–1915). She was the youngest of the family's three daughters. After she lost her father, as a 14-year-old she worked as a housemaid in various families until 1898 when she moved into her mother's home in Copenhagen. Although opportunities for women in industry were limited at the time, she managed to find work with a number of printing companies.

== Career ==
Crone's interest in trade unionism and social democracy began with her employment as a printing worker. She joined the Women Printing Workers Union (Kvindelige Trykkeriarbejderes Fagforening) in 1898, the year it was founded, immediately joining the board. After serving as secretary and vice-president, she became president in 1906. She was well respected in the position, even by her male colleagues. She is remembered for successfully opposing a 1911 bill preventing night work for women as, in line with other women's organizations, she felt it would lead to men taking women's jobs.

Crone maintained good relationships with other women's associations. Thanks to financial support from the social democrats, it appears she was one of the nine Danes able to attend the International Congress of Women, held in The Hague in 1915. In 1916, she became an early member of Danske Kvinders Fredskæde (Danish Women's Peace Chain), the Danish branch of the Women's International League for Peace and Freedom created as a result of the International Congress of Women. Realizing that the organization would benefit from the inclusion of working-class activists, the middle-class women who founded the organization successfully recruited Crone, recognizing her influential role as chair of the Women Print Workers Union.

On the political front, representing the social democrats in 1920 she was elected to the Landstinget, the upper house of the Danish parliament, where she remained in office for the rest of her life. In addition to social legislation, topics in which she took an active interest included health insurance, protection of children and young people and women's relation.

Crone played an active part at the Fourth LSI Women's Conference held in Vienna in July 1931, calling for less detail in international resolutions in the interests of leaving practical implementation to the participating countries. She also explained the importance of ensuring solidarity between men and women within the global Labour and Socialist International.

Henriette Crone died in Copenhagen of a heart attack on 11 October 1933.
