= Helga Larsen =

Pioneering Danish female politician

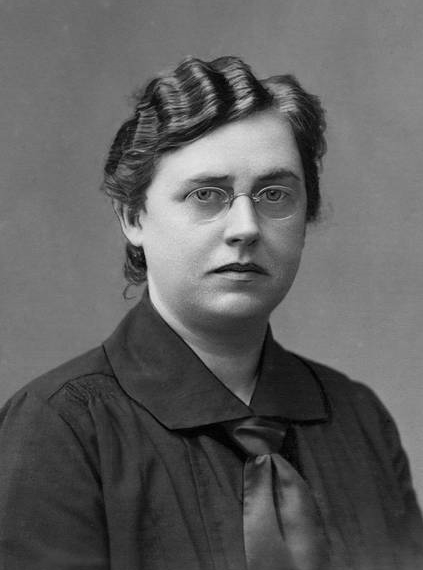
Helga Larsen

Helga Larsen née Petersen (1884–1947) was a Danish trade unionist and a pioneering female politician. She was one of the first four women to be elected to the Folketing (the Danish national parliament) in 1918.

== Biography ==
Born in Copenhagen on 21 April 1884, Helga Petersen was the daughter of Marie Sofie Petersen (1869–1920) who worked in a brewery and had attempted to organize her colleagues in a trade union branch for female brewery workers. Brought up in a poor home, from the age of nine, Petersen had to work after school for six hours a day to make ends meet.

Unable to follow a formal education, Petersen followed in her mother's footsteps as a brewery worker. From 1903 to 1906, she was appointed cashier in Copenhagen's newly founded Kvindelige Bryggeriarbejderforbund (Female Brewery Workers Union), providing her with experience in trade union management. In 1907, she married Christian Larsen (1879–1920) who was employed by the tramcar authority.

The following year, her colleagues invited her to chair the union. She went on to join the board of Dansk Bryggeri-, Brænderi- og Mineralvandsarbejderforbund, the national union for brewers, distillers and mineral water workers, a position she maintained until 1927 when she had to leave over a misunderstanding about a loan. From 1913 to 1944, she was a member of the Copenhagen City Council for the Social Democrats, becoming a member of the local council from 1944 to 1946. She also participated in activities in support of child care and housing for the poor.

In 1918, standing in Copenhagen for the Social Democrats, Larsen was one of the first four women to be elected to the Folketing. The others were Elna Munch (Social Liberals, Copenhagen), Mathilde Malling Hauschultz (Conservative People's Party, Copenhagen) and Karen Ankersted (Conservative People's Party, Aarhus). Larsen was the first working-class women in the Rigsdag and until 1936, was the only woman representing the Social Democrats. She strove for better conditions for working families, especially for single mothers and their children.

Helga Larsen died in Copenhagen on 13 December 1947.
