= Helen Clay Pedersen =

Danish women's rights activist

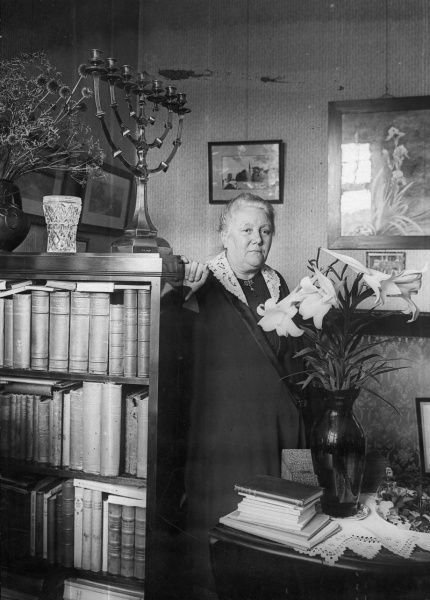
Helen Clay Pedersen

Helen Clay Pedersen née Helen Clay (1862–1950) was an English-born Danish women's rights activist who from 1910 was president of the Kolding branch of the Danish Women's Society (Dansk Kvindesamfund) for a period of 35 years. She is also remembered for establishing Kvindernes hus (the Women's House) which opened in Kolding in 1922. Clay Pedersen was active in the International Alliance of Women, participating in their 1929 conference in Berlin.

== Biography ==
Born on 27 May 1862 in London, England, Helen Clay was the daughter of the lawyer Samuel Hobbs (1834–1888) and Martha Clay (1838–1916). She met her husband-to-be Anders Simonsen Pedersen (1868–1958) in London where he was studying gardening. She returned to Denmark with him in 1893 and they married that September, settling in Kolding. In 1897, they established Aalykke, their gardening business with a flower and vegetable shop managed by Clay Pedersen.

The Kolding branch of the Danish Women's Society was established in 1905. After becoming president in 1908, Clay Petersen set about arranging the 1912 Kvindernes Udstilling i Kolding, a national exhibition of women's achievements in arts and crafts. The exhibition was a great success and a fine introduction to the Women's Society meeting the same year at which Jutta Bojsen-Møller called for rapid progress on women's voting rights.

Her next major project was the establishment of the Women's House in Kolding which opened in 1922. It was the first time the Women's Society had built their own facilities, 14 years earlier that Copenhagen's Women's House. In 1929, Clay Petersen attended the International Woman Suffrage Alliance conference in Berlin where she was one of those who created Open Door International, designed to support married women's working rights. The following year she headed the Danish version known as Den åbne Dør.

After heading Kolding's branch of the Women's Society for 35 years, she retired in 1945, becoming an honorary member for life, as well as an honorary member of Den åbne Dør.

Helen Clay Pedersen died on 16 April 1950 in Kolding. The Danish Women's Society placed a remembrance stone on her grave.
