= Danske Kvinders Forsvarsforening =

Danish women's organization

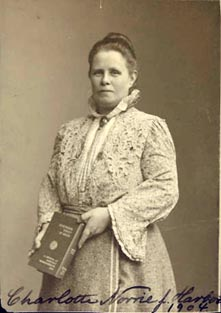
Charlotte Norrie, founder and first president of DKF

The Danske Kvinders Forsvarsforening (DKF), or Danish Women's Defence Association, was a Danish women's organization established in 1907 to improve the readiness of the Danish armed forces as tensions increased across Europe. With a membership of some 50,000, it was one of the largest Danish women's organizations up to the First World War. Politically neutral, it had chapters throughout the country. With a view to making Denmark's neutrality more convincing, it sensitized politicians to the need for more effective armed forces while encouraging men to take renewed interest in defence. In 1913, a collection from its membership provided funding for ammunition and uniforms for the voluntary shooting corps. After women had obtained voting rights in 1915, it was decided future progress on defence should be based on their political involvement. The organization was therefore dissolved in 1921.

Leading figures included Charlotte Norrie, founder and president 1907–15, Agnes Slott-Møller, president 1915–17, and Kirsten Langkilde, president 1917–19. Mathilde Malling and Johanne Münter were also active members of the organization.

Given the continued support for the aims of the organization south of the new Danish border in Southern Jutland, on the initiative of Ellen Bjerre, Julie Ramsing and Dagmar Schmiegelow, in 1921 a new organization was created as Danske Kvinders Slesvigske Forening (Danish Women's Schleswig Association). l

== See also ==
- Danske Kvinders Fredskæde
