= Henriette Beenfeldt =

Danish peace activist

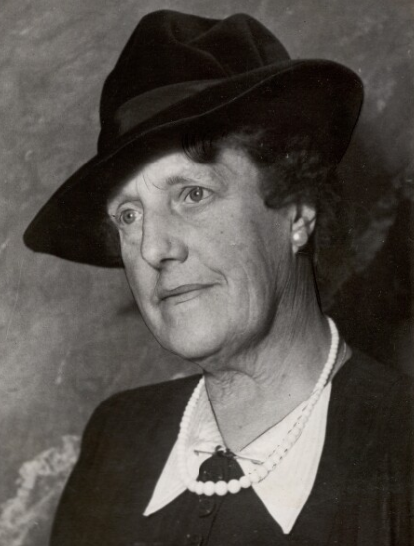
Henriette Beenfeldt

Henriette Dorthea Beenfeldt née Hansen (1878–1949) was a Danish peace activist and feminist who became one of the principal members of the Dansk Fredsforening (DF) (Danish Peace Society). After experiencing difficulties with board members of DF, she became an enthusiastic member of Kvindernes Internationale Liga for Fred og Frihed (KILFF), the Danish chapter of the Women's International League for Peace and Freedom, serving on the board of the Copenhagen branch. She continued to act as a radical pacifist, strongly opposing re-armament, even after Denmark joined NATO in 1949.

== Biography ==
Born on 28 May 1878 in Copenhagen, Henriette Dorthea Hansen was the daughter of the tobacco merchant Carl Vilhelm Hansen (1851–1922) and Karen Thorsen (1852–1900). In 1903, she married Thor Beenfeldt (1878–1954), a building inspector.

After the First World War had started in 1914, she and her husband became peace activists, joining the peace association Dansk Fredsforening (DF) in 1916. She was also an early member of Danske Kvinders Fredskæde (Danish Women's Peace Chain), the Danish chapter of the Women’s International League for Peace and Freedom. While many in DF considered the Women's Peace Chain to be a competitor, Beenfeldt argued that it was an advantage for the peace cause to be represented by more than one organization.

Henriette Beenfeldt died in Copenhagen on 24 December 1949.

== See also ==
- List of peace activists
