= Bodil Begtrup =

Danish women's rights activist and diplomat

Bodil Gertrud Begtrup (12 November 1903 – 12 December 1987) was a Danish women's rights activist and diplomat.

In 1929, she became a member of the board of Kvinderådet, in 1931, she was elected vice-president, and in the period 1946-1949 she was president. In 1939 she became Denmark's first female film censor. After the war she became a member of the Danish delegation to the UN General Assembly. In 1946 she became chairperson of the United Nations Commission on the Status of Women. Begtrup was vice chairperson of the committee that negotiated the Universal Declaration of Human Rights in 1948. She was appointed envoy to Iceland in 1949, and became Denmark's first female ambassador, when in 1955 she was appointed ambassador to Iceland.

== Early years ==
Bodil Andreasen grew up in an academic home where her father, Christian Adolph Andreasen, was a judge and her mother, Carla Sigrid Locher, worked as a teacher. At a young age, being the only girl, Andreasen chose to study at the mathematical line at Aalborg Cathedral School, where she graduated in 1921. She then chose to study further and began art history at the University of Copenhagen. However, her interest turned to social policy and international law, and began to study political science. In 1926, Andreasen became Representative of the Student Union in Geneva and met with Henni Forchhammer, who chaired the Danish Women's National Council (DKN). Later, Andreasen became the Forchhammer's secretary and developed an interest in women's issues. In 1929, she graduated from the university and married a specialist physician and widower Erik Worm Begtrup, son of Holger Begtrup, and became the stepmother of his four children. She influenced them, and over time Birgit Begtrup became politically active in women's issues, and Lena Begtrup (married Vedel-Petersen) became a significant name in the social policy area. Together with Erik Begtrup, Bodil Begtrup conceived a daughter, Marianne (1931), who died of congenital heart failure at five years of age. Her marriage to Erik Begtrup resolved a short time before her daughter's death. She remarried in 1948 to ambassador Laurits Bolt-Jorgenson.

Bodil Begtrup advanced up in DKN's hierarchy, and in 1929 she became a member of the board. Two years later, she became a vice chairman and in the years 1946-1949 she was the President of the council. She committed herself to the conditions and rights of women and children. This commitment led her to the public department Mothers' Relief Council, which she became a member of in 1939. Due to scarce financial resources and the great dependence of the council on private contributions, the Association of Our Little Children's Clothing was formed in 1940 with Begtrup as chairman. One of the funding problems in the Mothers' Relief Council was just finding adequate means for giving to the needs of children. With the new association and its parole; "No child must freeze in winter" it collected clothes that were given to children and infants. In 1935, Begtrup was one of the founders of a subdivision to DKN, Vore Borns Sundhed, who conducted awareness campaigns in the field of child health and well-being. This activity was to lay the foundation for the healthcare system, which included works in counseling for toddlers who are present in Denmark today. The same department also supported the introduction of school physicians and nurses. Begtrup worked in many because one of Denmark's three film censors would be a woman. As a result, she was appointed film censor in 1939, being the first woman in the country. For her, the influence of the film on children was a question that took much of her time, and in 1947 she released the book Children and Film, which addressed this. She held this trust mission until 1948.

Begtrup was a proponent of the construction of more public buildings. In an entry in the Boligen newspaper, she argued that the common facilities would be of major importance to the everyday lives of women. She also mentioned that a special collective housing assistance service could help housewives in their hurry every day.

In 1959, she is accredited to Switzerland in Berne, and from 1968 to 1973, she is appointed Ambassador to Portugal, in Lisbon
