= Mathilde Malling Hauschultz =

Pioneering Danish female politician

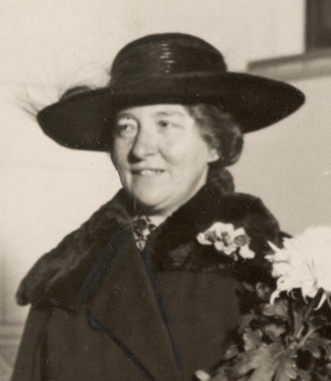
Mathilde Malling Hauschultz

Mathilde Johanne Malling Hauschultz (1885–1929) was a Danish lawyer and a pioneering female politician. She was one of the first four women to be elected to the Folketing (the Danish national parliament) in 1918.

== Biography ==
Born on 2 December 1885 in Copenhagen, Mathilde Johanne Malling was the daughter of the high court lawyer Gustav Frederik Ludvig Vilhelm Schneider Malling (1855–1919) and Hortensia Martine Malmberg (1860–1946). Raised in a well-to-do environment, she matriculated from Laura Engelhardt's School in 1905, studied law at the University of Copenhagen and graduated as Cand.jur. in 1911.

She immediately entered her father's legal firm, becoming a high court barrister and her father's partner in 1914. In 1915 she married the high court lawyer Rudolph Hauschultz (1884–1958) with whom she took over her father's business on his death in 1919. Following in the footsteps of Henny Magnussen, she became a well-established barrister.

On the political front, she was an active supporter of improvements to national defence, joining the Danish Women's Defence Association (Danske Kvinders Forsvarsforening) in 1907. In 1914, she co-founded the Danish Women's Conservative Association (Danske Kvinders konservative Forening), the first party-political women's organisation. By 1918, she had become widely known for her influence on the agenda of the Conservative People's Party where she also stood in favour of women's inclusion in the 1918 elections. It was therefore no surprise that not only she, but her colleague Karen Ankersted were both elected to the Folketing as representatives of the Conservative People's Party. Two other women were also elected: Helga Larsen for the Social Democrats and Elna Munch for the Social Liberals.

After Ankersted died in 1921, she was the only conservative women in the Rigsdag. She fought for better legal conditions for housewives and children while continuing to call for improvements to defence. She was a frequent contributor to magazines and newspaper, editing the Berlingske Tidende column on Kvinden og Hjemmet (Women and the Home).

Apparently as a result of over-exertion, she died from a stroke on 30 December 1929, only 44 years old. She is buried in Copenhagen's Assistens Cemetery.
