= Charlotte Norrie =

Danish nurse, women's rights activist and educator

Helga Charlotte Norrie
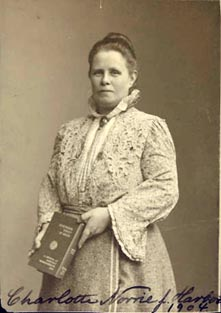
- Charlotte Norrie photographed in 1904
- Born: Helga Charlotte Harbou; 12 October 1855; Altona, Denmark
- Died: 19 December 1940 (aged 85); Copenhagen, Denmark
- Occupations: Nurse; Women's rights activist Educator

Helga Charlotte Norrie, née Harbou, (12 October 1855 – 19 December 1940) was a Danish nurse, women's rights activist and educator. She was a major contributor to the development of nursing as an acceptable profession for women and also campaigned for women's rights, especially voting rights.

== Early life and family ==
Born in Altona, Denmark, on 12 October 1855, Norrie was the daughter of Major-General Johannes Wilhelm Anthonius Harbou and his philanthropist wife Louise Ulrikke Mariane née Hellesen. After spending her early years in Altona and Rendsburg, she moved to Copenhagen in 1863. She first spent three years working as a governess at Juulskov Manor on the island of Funen but in 1880 became a nursing apprentice at Copenhagen's Almindelig Hospital (General Hospital). The following year, she gained further experience in nursing at Dronning Louises Børnehospital (Queen Louise's Children's Hospital). In 1885, she embarked on a successful marriage with Gordon Norrie, a doctor she had met at the General Hospital. They had three children together: Johannes William (1886), Edith (1889) and Inger (1892).

== Support for nursing ==
With her husband's support, in 1883 she ran nursing courses in basic skills and first-aid treatment. Together they trained over 500 women, many of whom came from her mother's philanthropic interests. Norrie became an outspoken critic of the poor standards of hospital training for nurses, specifically criticizing the substandard approach of the Danish Red Cross. As early as 1888, she announced her plans for establishing a private school of nursing in Ugeskrift for Læger (Doctors' Weekly) where she proposed extending nursing as a worthy profession for middle-class women. It was not, however, until 1910 that Denmark's first training facility for nurses opened in the re-established Rigshospitalet, a hospital run by the Danish state.

== Women's rights ==
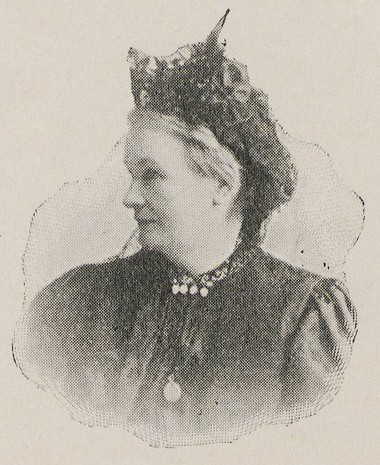
Norrie as depicted in Program of 1899 International Congress of Women at which she was a representative of Denmark

Norrie also developed wider interests in women's welfare, joining the Foreningen Kvindernes Bygning (Women's Building Association). In the late 1890s, she became a committee member of the Copenhagen branch of the women's rights organization Dansk Kvindesamfund where she served as deputy chair from 1900 to 1901. In 1899, together with Elly Nienstædt, she founded Dansk Kvinderåd (The Danish Council of Women) soon to be known as Danske Kvinders Nationalråd (DKN) where she served first as secretary and then as president until 1909. Through Danske Kvindeforeningers Valretsudvalg (Suffrage Committee of Danish Women's Associations), which she founded in 1898, she fought for voting rights not only for self-supporting women but also for dependent wives. At the 1899 congress of the International Council of Women in London, Norrie became a co-founder of the International Council of Nurses (ICN).

Despite her efforts to establish a Danish organization for improving working and training conditions for nurses, she was only able to head the Dansk Sygeplejeråd (Danish Council of Nurses) for a few months, facing increasing opposition from hospital nurses who called for a fully qualified nurse to become their leader. As a result, she turned her interests to women's suffrage, helping to found the International Woman Suffrage Alliance in 1904 in Berlin. In 1907, she became a dynamic co-founder and member of Danske Kvinders Forsvarsforening (Danish Women's Defence Association) which she chaired until 1915, raising membership to some 50,000. She then founded the non-party Kvinde-Vælger-Klubberne (Women Voters' Clubs) designed to encourage women to stand for election. Finally, from 1920 to 1927 she returned to her nursing ambitions, founding the Ejra School for nursing and first-aid treatment.

Charlotte Norrie died in Copenhagen on 19 December 1940 and is buried in Helsingør.
