= Clara Tybjerg =

Danish women's rights activist and pacifist

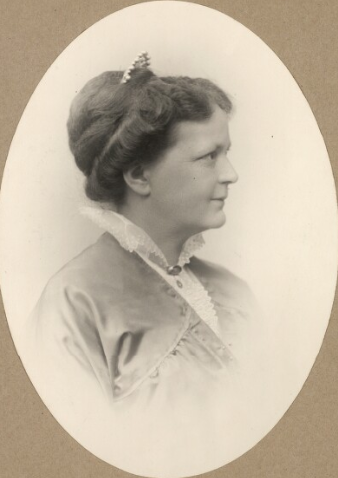
Clara Tybjerg

Clara Sophie Tybjerg née Sarauw (3 March 1864 – 14 January 1941) was a Danish women's rights activist, pacifist and educator. In 1915, she attended the International Women's Conference in The Hague, together with Thora Daugaard. Thereafter she helped establish and, from 1916 to 1920, headed the Danske Kvinders Fredskæde or Danish Women's Peace Chain which became the Danish branch of the Women's International League for Peace and Freedom. She is also remembered for helping to bring hunger-stricken children from Vienna to Denmark after the First World War.

== Early life and education ==
Born on 3 March 1864 in Kalvehave Parish near Vordingborg, Clara Sophie Sarauw was the daughter of the forester Conrad August Nicolaus Sarauw (1816–1886) and Betzy Wilhelmine Hansen (1834–1909). After her father died she moved to Copenhagen where she worked as a teacher at Den Kellerske Åndssvageanstalt which specialized in educating handicapped children. She then went to the United States where she worked and continued her studies at the Pennsylvania Training School for Feebleminded Children until 1892.

On 18 May 1893, she married the high court judge Erland Tybjerg (1863–1925). The following year, she was employed as an English teacher at H. Adlers Fællesskole, the first mixed school in Denmark, where she remained until 1915. Even after she left, she continued to be interested in education, especially in connection with handicapped children.

== Participation in the Danish women's movement ==
Tybjerg was an active participant in the Danish women's movement. In 1913, she became the international secretary for Danske Kvinders Nationalråd (The Women's Council in Denmark) and was also a member of Kvindelig Læseforening (Women Readers' Association). Until Danish women finally succeeded in achieving universal suffrage in 1915, she and her sister Elna Munch fought for the cause.

== Career as a peace activist ==
In 1915, she attended the International Women's Peace Conference in the Hague. On returning to Denmark, together with Thora Daugaard, she founded Danske Kvinders Fredskæde (DKF), the Danish arm of the Women's International League for Peace and Freedom. Tybjerg was responsible for setting up a study network consisting of 30 women, including Gyrithe Lemche, Henni Forchhammer, Estrid Hein, Matilde Bajer and Ellen Hørup. They travelled throughout Denmark encouraging women to become members of the DKF by paying one "peace crown" (fredskrone) and signing a list calling for "Justice rather than Might". Tybjerg chaired the organization from 1915 to 1920, increasing membership to around 10,000. After local branches were established throughout Denmark, she chaired the Copenhagen branch from 1921 to 1925. Thora Daugaard succeeded her as chair of the DKF.

After the hostilities of the First World War finally subsided, the WILPF organized a second conference in Zürich. Tybjerg, representing the Danish branch, called for special attention to be given to the needs of children and young people. From about 1921, she actively strove to provide support for children in Vienna who were suffering from malnutrition. She succeeded in have many of them brought to Denmark where they could be restored to health in Danish homes.

== Personal life ==
Tybjerg was married and had two children. After losing her husband in 1925, she spent a few years in Hillerød where she continued to participate in peace initiatives. She died in Copenhagen on 14 January 1941. She is buried in Tibirke Cemetery near Tisvilde.

== See also ==
- List of peace activists
