= Nielsine Nielsen =

Danish academic & physician (1850–1916)

- Born: 10 June 1850; Svendborg, Denmark
- Died: 8 October 1916 (aged 66); Copenhagen, Denmark
- Education: University of Copenhagen (1851)
- Occupation: Physician
- Known for: First female academic and physician in Denmark

Nielsine Nielsen (10 June 1850 – 8 October 1916) was the first female academic and physician in Denmark. She graduated in 1885 and in 1889 she established her own medical practice and worked as a general practitioner. She was active in the gender equality movement through her work in Danish Women's Society.

== Early life ==
Her parents were the well off shipowner Lars Nielsen (1808–86) and Karen Jensen (1811–82). She was raised in Svendborg. During her childhood, her brother and sister died of typhoid, which is said to have affected her interest in medicine.

== Career ==
In 1868, she supported herself as a teacher at the Frøknerne Villemoes-Qvistgaards Institut in Copenhagen and worked as a governess in the provinces a couple of years. In 1874, she corresponded with the Swedish female physician Charlotte Yhlen, who advised her to contact the Danish parliamentarian C. E. Fenger, who was known to support women's rights and who had previously supported the first female Danish telegrapher, Mathilde Fibiger. Fenger forwarded her apply to study medicine at the university to the ministry of education.

In 1875, a royal decree issued the reform to allow women access to university education. In 1877, she and Johanne Gleerup became the first two female university students in Denmark. She was given a small allowance from the Dansk Kvindesamfund to make it economically possible for her to study. She graduated as a medical doctor and physician in 1885.

She established herself as a medical practitioner in Copenhagen. She had planned to specialize in gynecology, but the only Danish gynecologist at the time, F. Howitz, would not accept her. However, in 1906 she was appointed communal specialist in venereal diseases and engaged in the rights of prostitutes.

Nielsine Nielsen was active in the women's movement through the Dansk Kvindesamfund (DK). However, critical of the much too careful DK, she became engaged in more radical women's groups. In 1893–1898, she was the chairperson of the women's suffrage association Kvindevalgretsforeningen (KVF). In 1904, she and Louise Nørlund, Birgitte Berg Nielsen and Alvilda Harbou Hoff became the first female members of the liberal party. In 1907, she was one of the co-founders of the Landsforbundet for Kvinders Valgret.

== Legacy ==
A road has been named after her at Bispebjerg Hospital. There was talk about naming a road at Rigshospitalet, but has not happened.
