= Johanne Rambusch =

Johanne Rambusch (1865-1944) was a Danish feminist and politician, (Danish Social Liberal Party). She was the co-founder of the Landsforbundet for Kvinders Valgret (Country Association for Women's Suffrage) or LKV (1907), the more radical of the two main Danish suffrage movements, and alongside Elna Munch its leading member. She was the chairperson of the LKV from its foundation until its dissolution after the introduction of women suffrage in 1915. In 1915, she became the first of her gender in the Danish Social Liberal Party, and was a member of the Landsting (Denmark) in 1927–28.
