= Eva Madsen =

Denmark's first female mayor

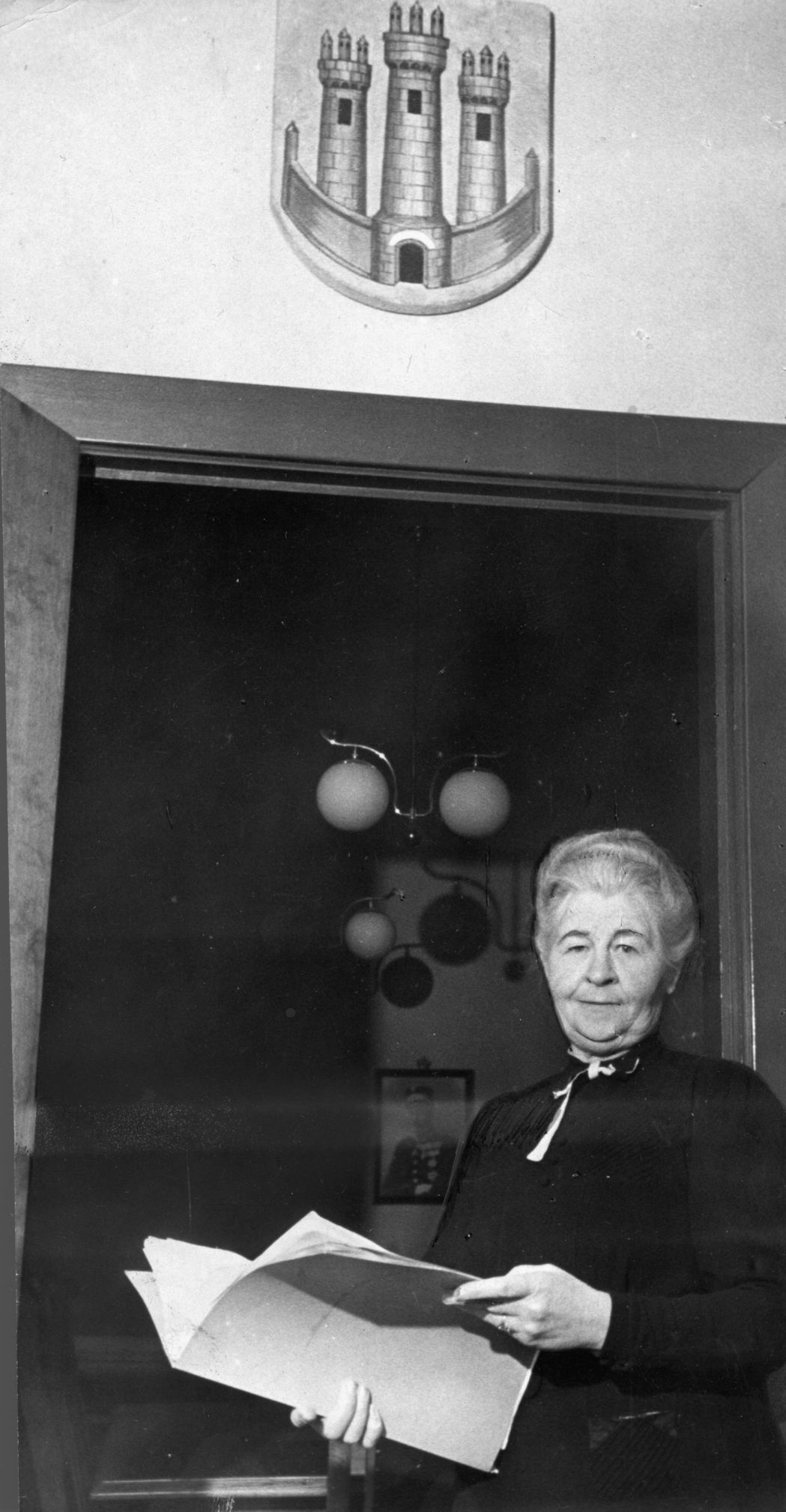
Eva Madsen on being elected mayor in 1950

Eva Marie Madsen née Braae (1884–1972) was a Danish municipal politician. She became Denmark's first female mayor in January 1950 when she was elected Mayor of Stege on the island of Møn.

== Biography ==
Born on 4 March 1884 in Næstved, Eva Marie Braae was the daughter of the paper merchant Hans Frederik Braae (1851–1924) and Augusta Margrethe Jørgensen (1863–1940). She had hoped to become a physician but after covering the cost of her four brothers' education, her parents could not afford to send their two daughters to university. After completing her basic schooling, from 1901 Eva Braae worked for a number of years as a teacher in a Næstved private school. After persuading her father to send her to high school, she matriculated from N. Zahle's School in 1907. She then began to read medicine but abandoned her studies when in 1912 she married the lawyer Rudolph Madsen who was the town clerk of Stege on the island of Møn.

For the next few years, Madsen raised her daughter and taught in the local school. In 1926, she was persuaded to be elected president of the Møn branch of the Danish Women's Society. Three years later, she was elected as a municipal representative of the Social Liberal Party (Radikale Venstre), beginning 20 years service on the municipal council. This included chairing several committees, including those on education and child welfare for extended periods until 1950. In 1946, she was appointed deputy mayor, successfully achieving her political goals and gaining popularity. She was particularly adept at collaborating with the male members of the council while constantly promoting the need for attention to be given to the views of her female colleagues. In 1950, she stated that she would be ready to support the election of a female mayor, whatever her political party.

On 25 January 1950, following the death of the Conservative mayor Christian F. Carøe in a road accident, she was elected Mayor of Stege Municipality. She had however already announced her retirement and her intention not to stand at the municipal elections on 14 March. She therefore only served as mayor for less than two months.

Following her retirement she moved to Charlottenlund with her husband, who died in 1958. She continued to live there with her daughter and grandchild until her death in Ordrup on 16 March 1972. She is buried in Ordrup Cemetery.
