= Landsforbundet for Kvinders Valgret =

Landsforbundet for Kvinders Valgret, or LKV (National Association for Women's Suffrage), was a Danish association for women's suffrage, active from 1907 until 1915.

As the Danish Women's Society was initially not strongly committed to women's suffrage, in 1898, a new organization was established: Danske Kvindeforeningers Valgretsudvalg, specifically to support voting rights for women. From 1904, it was known as Valgretsforbundet. In 1907, it merged with Landsforbundet for Kvinders Valgret.

Landsforbundet for Kvinders Valgret originated from the local women's association Politisk Kvindeforening. In 1906, Københavns Kvindevalgretsforening was founded, and in 1907, the name was changed to Landsforbundet for Kvinders Valgret. It was founded by Elna Munch, Johanne Rambusch and Marie Hjelmer. From the start, Julie Arenholt was one of the most influential members. The organisation was founded in response to the women's suffrage work of Dansk Kvindesamfund, which was regarded too careful by the founders of the LKV. The LKV became a national wide organisation which united all the local branches of women suffrage organisations in Denmark and founded new ones. The organisation was dissolved when the goal was met in 1915.

== See also ==
- Women's suffrage organizations
- List of suffragists and suffragettes
- Timeline of women's suffrage
