= Jutta Bojsen-Møller =

Danish high school proponent and women's rights activist

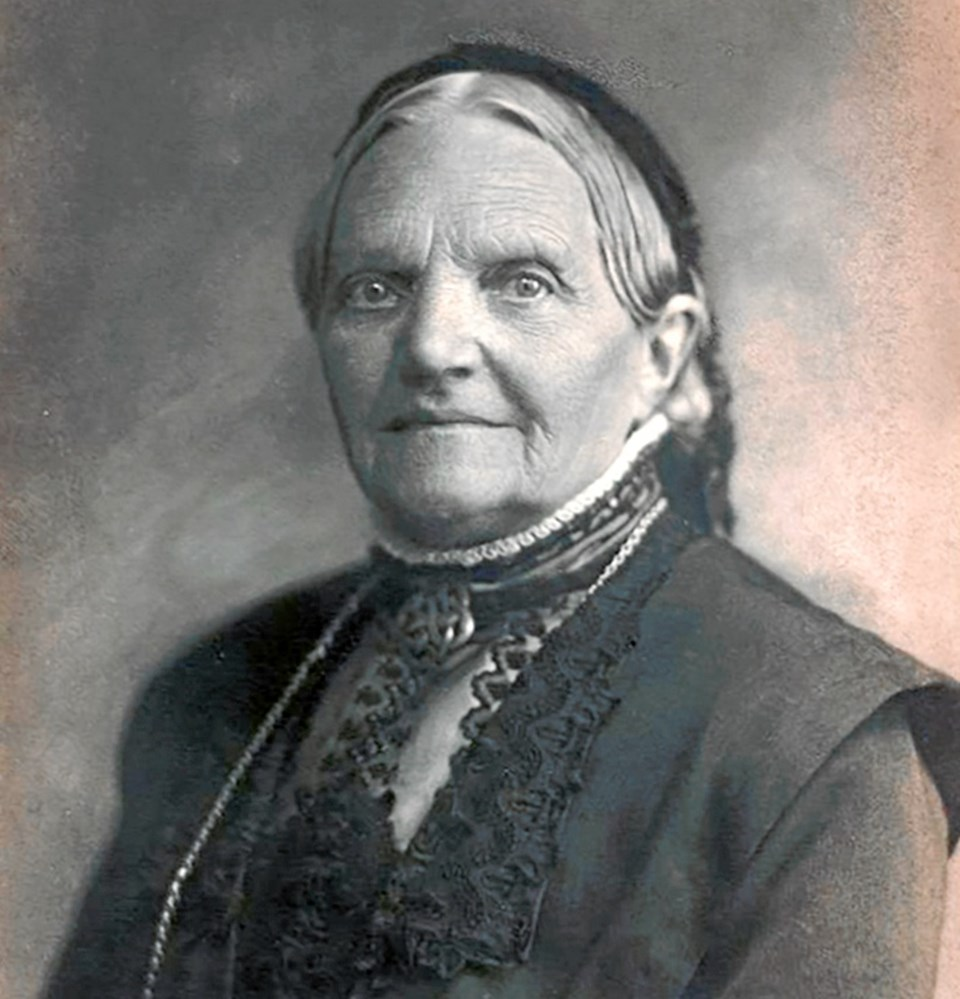
Jutta Bojsen-Møller

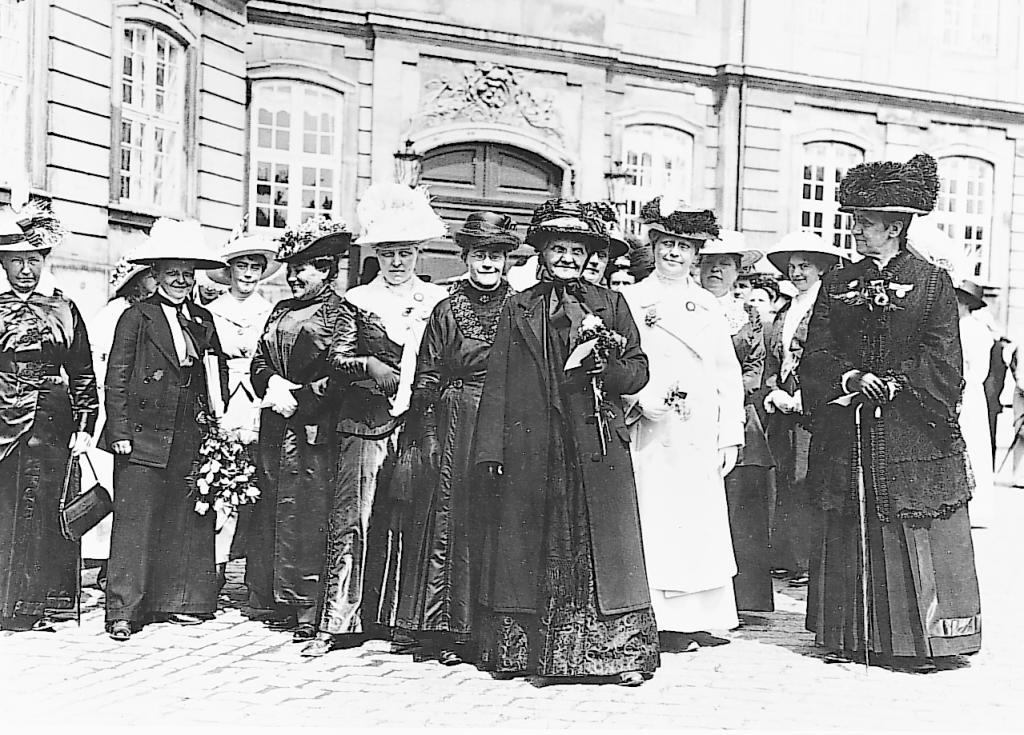
Bojsen-Møller (centre) in the deputation to the Danish monarch on 5 June 1915 in connection with women's voting rights

Jutta Bojsen-Møller born Bojsen (1837–1927) was a Danish high school proponent, a women's rights activist and a member of the Danish Women's Society which she headed from 1894 to 1910.

== Biography ==
Born in Store Heddinge on the Danish island of Zealand, Jutta Kunigunde Bojsen was the daughter of Frederik Engelhardt Boisen (1808–1882), a parish priest, and the writer Eline Birgitte Heramb (1813–1871). In 1857, she married the parish priest Otto Ditlev Møller (1814–1892) with whom she had eight children.

One of a family of 11, she was brought up in Skørpinge near Slagelse where her father was appointed as parish priest shortly after her birth. Together with her siblings, she was educated at home by private tutors with an emphasis on Grundtvigian principles.

After her husband died in 1892, she became the matron at the folk high school in Lyngby, adopting the same position from 1905 to 1909 at Rødkilde Højskole on the island of Møn, founded by her brother Frede Bojsen.

Thanks to her friendship with the poet Jens Christian Hostrup and his wife Elisabeth, both of whom were active in the Danish Women's Society, she became increasingly interested in the women's movement. In 1894, encouraged by Astrid Hostrup who was active both as a folk high school matron and as a member of the Women's Society, Bojsen-Møller joined the organization and was immediately elected president, a post she kept until 1910. She took an early interest in women's voting rights, becoming a member of the Women's Society's Voting Rights Committee when it was founded in 1898. Only in 1906 did she and Louise Nørlund succeed in making women's suffrage an official item on the organizations agenda.

She did much to extend the interests of the Women's Society over the whole of Denmark. Under her remit, membership increased from 1,000 to 7,000 and in 1915, women obtained the right to vote.

Jutta Bojsen-Møller died in Copenhagen on 12 January 1927 and is buried in Lynge's old cemetery.

== Awards ==
In recognition of her services, in 1925 she was honoured with the gold Medal of Merit.
