= Danske Kvinders Fredskæde =

Danish women's peace organization

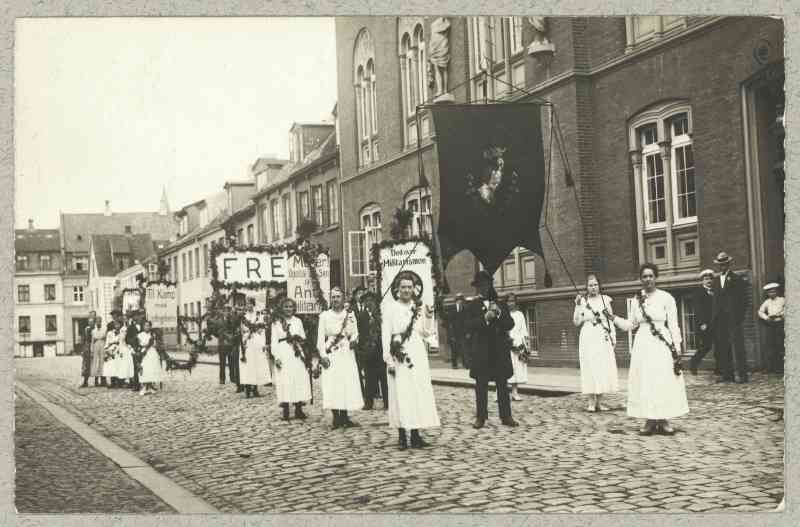
Early Danish women's peace demonstration

Danske Kvinders Fredskæde (Danish Women's Peace Chain) is the original name of the Danish branch of the Women's International League for Peace and Freedom. It was founded in 1915 following the International Congress of Women held in The Hague. The organization was aimed at developing national branches of women calling for more active support for peace once the First World War was over. Early activists from Denmark included Thora Daugaard (1874–1851) and Clara Tybjerg (1864–1941).

Other early members of the organization included Benny Cederfeld de Simonsen (1865–1952), Henni Forchhammer (1863–1955), Eline Hansen (1859–1919), Eva Moltesen (1871–1934), Louise Wright (1861–1935) and Else Zeuthen (1897–1975). While they were all middle class, the women had varying backgrounds. One was a school teacher, another was active in politics, there was a philanthropist and two of them were writers. They succeeded in building up membership not only from their friends and colleagues but from members of the working class including the trade unionist Henriette Crone (1874–1933).

In 1925, the organization was renamed Kvindernes Internationale Liga for Fred og Frihed (KILFF) in line with the parent organization. By 1919, there were 12,000 members. The organization's journal was published from 1924, titled Fred og Frihed (Peace and Freedom) in 1926. Thora Daugaard headed the organization from 1920 to 1941.

In connection with the 1932 World Disarmament Conference, members of the KILFF collected 437,457 signatures calling for disarmament. In the late 1930s, it also took part in the international campaign for rescuing Jewish children from Nazi Germany. In 1947, the KILFF became a member of the Danish Peace Council, a chapter of the World Peace Council.

KILFF has continued to work with other organizations intent on peace and disarmament. In the 1990s, it was an active supporter of women's projects in war-torn countries, especially the Balkans. Today, its work places emphasis on trafficking in women and in addressing the UN Security Council Resolution on Women, Peace and Security.

== See also ==
- Danske Kvinders Forsvarsforening
- List of anti-war organizations
