= Elna Munch =

Danish feminist politician

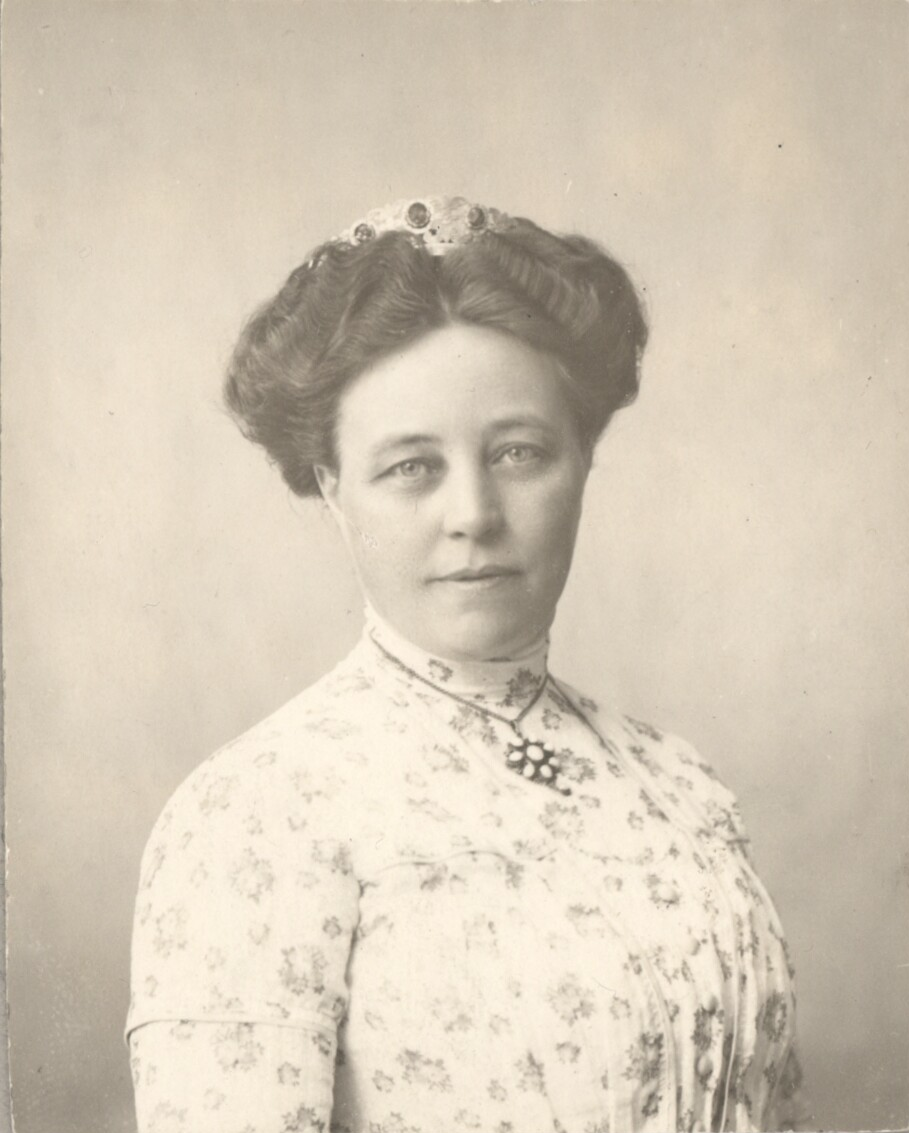
- Born: Elna Sarauw; 13 June 1871; Kalvehave, Denmark
- Died: 17 November 1945 (aged 74); Copenhagen, Denmark
- Education: Copenhagen University
- Occupations: Politician, Suffragist
- Spouse: Peter Rochegune Munch

Elna Munch (née Sarauw; 13 June 1871 – 17 November 1945) was a Danish feminist and politician, (Danish Social Liberal Party). She was the co-founder of the Landsforbundet for Kvinders Valgret (National Association for Women's Suffrage) or LKV (1907), the more radical of the two main Danish suffrage movements, and alongside Johanne Rambusch its leading member.

== Biography ==
She was born to forester Conrad August Nicolaus Sarauw and Betzy Wilhelmine Hansen and was the younger sister of Clara Tybjerg (1864–1941). She was educated at the N. Zahle's School, studied mathematics at the Copenhagen University and became the second woman mathematician to graduate from a university after Thyra Eibe. She was a teacher at the school of Marie Kruse in 1900-1918 and married the politician Peter Rochegune Munch in 1902.

She was the vice chairperson of the LKV from its foundation until its dissolution after the introduction of women suffrage in 1915. She was the organiser of the local sections of the LKV, and represented Denmark at the congresses of the International Woman Suffrage Alliance from 1906 to 1923.

In 1918, when women could become candidates in national elections, she was one of the first four women to be elected to the Folketing (the Danish national parliament). She held her seat until 1935.

She died on 17 November 1945 in Copenhagen.
