= Kvinderådet =

Women's council of Denmark

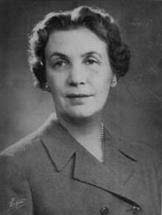

Kvinderådet (known in English as The Women's Council in Denmark), formerly Danske Kvinders Nationalråd), was established in 1899 as the Danish arm of the International Council of Women. It acts as an umbrella organization for all the Danish women's associations, working in the areas of women's rights as well as social, professional and economic interests.

== Background ==
Founded in 1899, the Women's Council's two main goals were to act as a forum for all the women's associations in Denmark and to contribute to international policy work with the International Council of Women. Today its members liaise with associations dealing with political gender equality councils, immigration, professional matters, trades unions and religious bodies. It represents organizations in government, public authorities and various councils and committees. It has also participated in the UN General Assembly.

The Council has fostered the creation of several new organizations, including the Danske Kvinders Erhvervsråd (Danish Women's Business Council) in 1934 and the Danske Kvinders Samfundstjeneste (Danish Women's Society Service) in 1940. More recently, the organization has fought for equal pay and leadership for women in Denmark, and internationally for women's reproductive rights, gender equality in politics and business and measures to prevent trafficking.

== Today ==
Today the Council represents 45 Danish organizations with a total membership of over a million. On 26 March 2023, Maria Jose Landeira Østergård was elected as new president of the organisation.
