= Caroline Testman =

Danish feminist

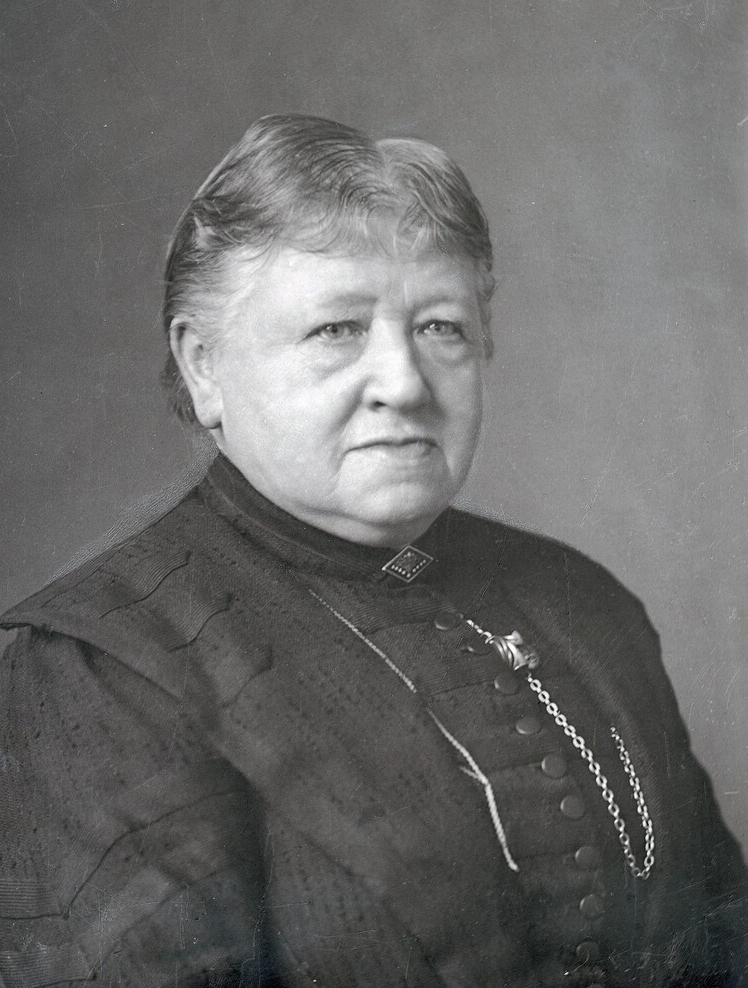
Image of Caroline Testman

Caroline Sophie Testman (1839 - 1919), was a Danish feminist. She was the co-founder of the Dansk Kvindesamfund or DK (Danish Women's Association) and its chairman 1872–1883.

She was the daughter of postmaster and captain Peder Otto Testman (1806–90) and Henriette Marie Hohlenberg (1808–74). She had the wish to study, but was not given permission by her father. In the 1860s, however, she became active as a freelance journalist, and contributed with articles to various papers, something she continued to do most of her life. One of the papers she contributed to was Tidskrift för hemmet, the paper of the Swedish feminist Sophie Adlersparre.

Caroline Testman was the co-founder of the first women's organisation in Denmark, Dansk Kvindesamfund or DK (Danish Women's Association) alongside Tagea Johansen, Elisabet Ouchterlony and Matilde Bajer. DK was founded in 1871 as a branch of the French Association Internationale des Femmes with Matilde Bajer as chairman and Caroline Testman as treasurer. Bajer soon left her position, and when her successor Severine Casse did the same in 1872, Testman became its chairman, a post she kept until 1883. During her tenure, she focused on access of education and professional work for women. She founded Handelsskolen for Kvinder (The Business School For Women) in 1872 to open the work market for women within the expanding work force in trade-, office and banking-professions: this school was eventually given government support and remained the primary institution of academic education for women in Denmark within this subjects until 1903, when this education was made available for women by the state. In 1874, she also founded Søndagsskolen for Kvinder (SK) for elementary education of working-class women, which were staffed with voluntary academics: this was active until 1890, when this education was made available for women by the student union. In 1876, she founded Tegneskolen for Kvinder (The Drawing School For Women) alongside Charlotte Klein.

Caroline Testman was a supporter of women suffrage, but during her tenure as chairman, the question had not yet been an issue. In 1884, she proposed to have the question accepted as one of the goals of the association, but without success. In 1887 she supported the reform suggestion of conditional women suffrage made by the politician Fredrik Bajer. She continued to be an active member within the DK until her death. In her will, she set up a fund for female students.
