= Line Luplau =

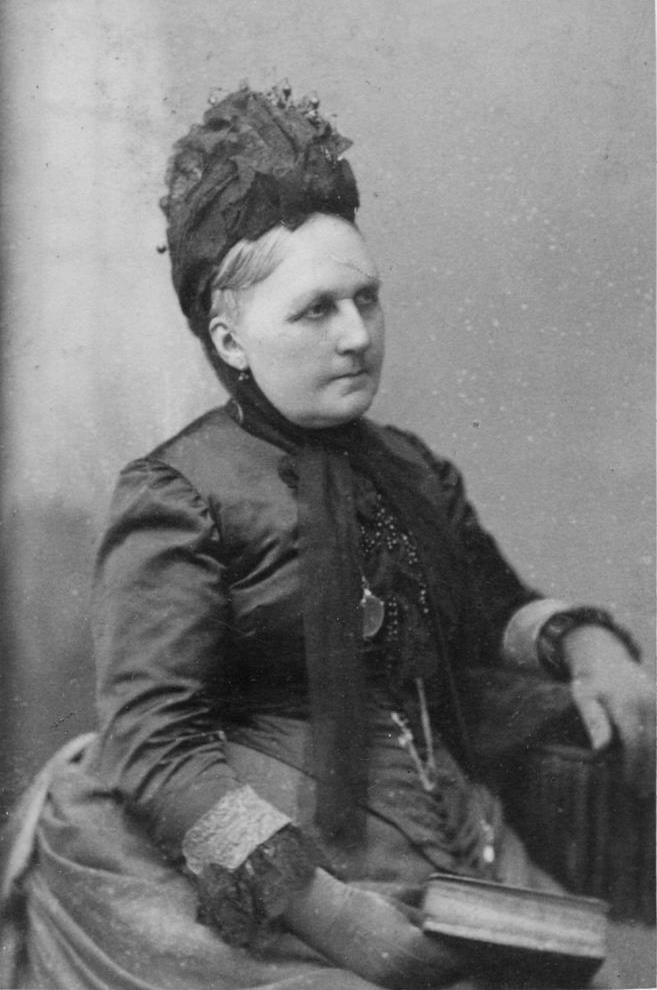
- Line Luplau by Mary Steen
- Born: 22 April 1823; Mern, Denmark
- Died: 10 September 1891 (aged 68); Frederiksberg, Denmark
- Spouse: Daniel Carl Erhard Luplau (m. 1847)

Line Luplau (1823–1891) was a Danish feminist and suffragist. She was the co-founder of the Danske Kvindeforeningers Valgretsforbund or DKV (Danish Women's Society Suffrage Union) and first chairperson in 1889–1891.

== Life ==
Line Luplau was born on 22 April 1823 in Mern, the daughter of the vicar Hans Christian Monrad (1780–1825) and Ferdinandine Henriette Gieertsen (1783–1871) and married the vicar Daniel Carl Erhard Luplau (1818–1909), in 1847.

Luplau developed an early frustration over the fact that women was not recognized full rights as humans because of their sex. This interest is regarded to have developed from the public debate following the controversial novel Clara Raphael by Mathilde Fibiger (1851). Her spouse served as a vicar in a parish in Slesvig-Holsten, and the family was forced to leave for Varde when this part of Denmark was lost after the war in 1864. In Varde, Luplau founded a charity organisation, and became the first woman in Denmark to speak at a national celebration.

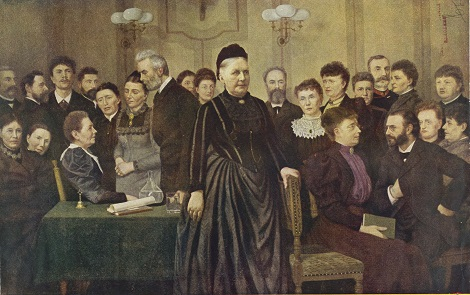
Line luplau seen in the foreground on her daughter Marie Luplau's large group portrait painting From the Early Days of the Fight for Women's Suffrage (1897).

In 1872, Luplau became a member of the local branch of the women's organisation Dansk Kvindesamfund (DK) alongside her spouse and her daughter Marie Luplau. Her interest in women's rights focused on woman suffrage and equal political rights, and she belonged to the opposition group within the DK. In 1888, she delivered a list of 1702 names in support to Fredrik Bajer's motion in the parliament of women suffrage as the representative of the DK. In 1885, she belonged to the supporters of the newly founded women's organisation Kvindelig Fremskridtsforening (KF), a fraction of former DK members, and served on the KF central committee in 1886. In 1886, she moved to Copenhagen after her husband's retirement, and in 1888, she represented KF at the first Nordic women's conference in Copenhagen, where she and Johanne Meyer presented women suffrage as one of the four main issues within women's rights. Luplau became one of the leading figures of the Danish women suffrage movement, and served on the board of the KF paper Hvad vi vil alongside Matilde Bajer, Anna Nielsen and Massi Bruhn.

In 1889, Luplau founded the Danish suffrage movement Kvindevalgretsforeningen (KVF) together with Louise Nørlund, and served as its chairperson from 1889 to 1891. Her goal was to form an organisation exclusively for women's suffrage rather than the DK and KF, which handled many different women's issues, and she gathered support from both males and various different political groups, especially left-wing political groups. Luplau was a controversial, strict and energetic activist with a direct approach whose activism aroused strong emotions, and she was not popular among other women's groups, who considered her to have split the women's movement. In 1891, she was forced to resign as chairperson of the KVF for health reasons.

In 1917, her daughter Marie Luplau created a group portrait painting for the Danish parliament depicting the notable members of the women suffrage movement, where Luplau was placed in the front.
