= List of women nominators for the Nobel Prize =

Female nominators for the Nobel Prize

The Nobel Prize medal received by the laureates

The Nobel Prize (Swedish: Nobelpriset) is a set of five different prizes that, according to its benefactor Alfred Nobel in his 1895 will, must be awarded "to those who, during the preceding year, have conferred the greatest benefit to humankind". The five prizes are awarded in the fields of Physics, Chemistry, Physiology or Medicine, Literature, and Peace.

Since 1901, numerous nominators have forwarded their nominations of distinguished individuals or organizations for the prize, and most of these nominators were women. The following is a list of the female nominators for the prestigious Nobel Prize:

== Physics ==
The Nobel Committee for Physics sends confidential forms to persons who are competent and qualified to nominate. According to the nomination process, the individuals are considered the qualified nominators for the physics prize:

- 1. Swedish and foreign members of the Royal Swedish Academy of Sciences;
- 2. Members of the Nobel Committee for Physics;
- 3. Nobel Prize laureates in physics;
- 4. Tenured professors in the Physical sciences at the universities and institutes of technology of Sweden, Denmark, Finland, Iceland and Norway, and Karolinska Institutet, Stockholm;
- 5. Holders of corresponding chairs in at least six universities or university colleges (normally, hundreds of universities) selected by the Academy of Sciences with a view to ensuring the appropriate distribution over the different countries and their seats of learning; and
- 6. Other scientists from whom the Academy may see fit to invite proposals.

Image	Nominator	Born	Died	Nominees	Year(s) Nominated
Physics
	Marie Skłodowska-Curie	7 November 1867; Warsaw, Poland	4 July 1934; Passy, Haute-Savoie, France	Joseph John Thompson (1856–1940)	1905
	Marie Skłodowska-Curie	7 November 1867; Warsaw, Poland	4 July 1934; Passy, Haute-Savoie, France	Henri Poincaré (1854–1912)	1910
	Hertha Sponer	1 September 1895; Nysa, Poland	27 February 1968; Sehnde, Germany	Samuel Goudsmit (1902–1978)	1956
	Hertha Sponer	1 September 1895; Nysa, Poland	27 February 1968; Sehnde, Germany	George Uhlenbeck (1900–1988)	1956
	Marie-Antoinette Tonnelat	5 March 1912; Charolles, France	3 December 1980; Paris, France	Louis Néel (1904–2000)	1960
	Marie-Antoinette Tonnelat	5 March 1912; Charolles, France	3 December 1980; Paris, France	Alfred Kastler (1902–1984)	1965
	Anne Barbara Underhill	12 June 1920; Vancouver, Canada	3 July 2003; Vancouver, Canada	Hendrik Christoffel van de Hulst (1918–2000)	1964
	Katharina Boll-Dornberger	2 November 1909; Vienna, Austria	27 July 1981; Berlin, Germany	John Desmond Bernal (1901–1971)	1966
	Maria Goeppert Mayer	28 June 1906; Katowice, Poland	20 February 1972; San Diego, California, United States	Bernd Theodor Matthias (1918–1980)	1966, 1967, 1970, 1971
	Eleanor Margaret Burbidge	12 August 1919; Davenport, Greater Manchester, United Kingdom	5 April 2020; San Francisco, California, United States	Subrahmanyan Chandrasekhar (1910–1995)	1970
	Dorothy Crowfoot Hodgkin	12 May 1910; Cairo, Egypt	29 July 1994; Ilmington, United Kingdom	Paul Peter Ewald (1888–1985)	1970, 1974
	Berta Karlik	24 January 1904 Vienna, Austria-Hungary	4 February 1990 Vienna, Austria	Otto Kratky (1902–1995)	1973
	Inga Fischer-Hjalmars	January 16, 1918 Stockholm, Sweden	September 17, 2008 Lidingö, Sweden	Oskar Klein (1894–1977)	1974

== Chemistry ==
For the chemistry prize, the following individuals are considered as qualified nominators:

- 1. Swedish and foreign members of the Royal Swedish Academy of Sciences;
- 2. Members of the Nobel Committees for Chemistry and Physics;
- 3. Nobel Prize laureates in chemistry and physics;
- 4. Permanent professors in the sciences of Chemistry at the universities and institutes of technology of Sweden, Denmark, Finland, Iceland and Norway, and Karolinska Institutet, Stockholm;
- 5. Holders of corresponding chairs in at least six universities or university colleges selected by the Academy of Sciences with a view to ensuring the appropriate distribution over the different countries and their centers of learning; and
- 6. Other scientists from whom the Academy may see fit to invite proposals.

Image	Nominator	Born	Died	Nominees	Year(s) Nominated
Chemistry
	Marie Reimer	9 May 1867; United States	24 February 1947; United States	Moses Gomberg (1866–1947)	1928
	Marie Reimer	9 May 1867; United States	24 February 1947; United States	Vincent du Vigneaud (1901–1978)	1945
	Irène Joliot-Curie	12 September 1897; Paris, France	17 March 1956; Paris, France	George de Hevesy (1885–1966)	1936
	Irène Joliot-Curie	12 September 1897; Paris, France	17 March 1956; Paris, France	Georges Urbain (1872–1938)	1936
	Irène Joliot-Curie	12 September 1897; Paris, France	17 March 1956; Paris, France	Jacques Tréfouël (1897–1977)	1944, 1946
	Irène Joliot-Curie	12 September 1897; Paris, France	17 March 1956; Paris, France	Linus Pauling (1901–1994)	1954
	Anna Chrząszczewska	Poland	Poland	Wojciech Świętosławski (1881–1968)	1936
	Pauline Ramart-Lucas	22 November 1880; Paris, France	17 March 1953; Paris, France	Ernest Fourneau (1872–1949)	1940
	Pauline Ramart-Lucas	22 November 1880; Paris, France	17 March 1953; Paris, France	Jacques Tréfouël (1897–1977)	1940, 1946, 1950
	Pauline Ramart-Lucas	22 November 1880; Paris, France	17 March 1953; Paris, France	Gabriel Bertrand (1867–1962)	1948
	Pauline Ramart-Lucas	22 November 1880; Paris, France	17 March 1953; Paris, France	Thérèse Tréfouël (1892–1978)	1950
	Pauline Ramart-Lucas	22 November 1880; Paris, France	17 March 1953; Paris, France	Gladwyn Buttle (1899–1983)	1950
	Clara Benson	5 June 1875; Port Hope, Ontario, Canada	24 March 1964; Port Hope, Ontario, Canada	Donald Van Slyke (1883–1971)	1941
	Clara Benson	5 June 1875; Port Hope, Ontario, Canada	24 March 1964; Port Hope, Ontario, Canada	Robley Cook Williams (1908–1995)	1945
	Germaine Cauquil	1 November 1897; Montpellier, France	30 January 1983; Montpellier, France	Ernest Fourneau (1872–1949)	1949
	Germaine Cauquil	1 November 1897; Montpellier, France	30 January 1983; Montpellier, France	Maurice-Marie Janot (1903–1978)	1957
	Maria Mercedes de Menarfa	Uruguay	Uruguay	Domingo Giribaldo (1876–1950)	1949
	Marguerite Perey	19 October 1909; Villemomble, France	13 May 1975; Louveciennes, France	Glenn Theodore Seaborg (1912–1999)	1951
	Marguerite Perey	19 October 1909; Villemomble, France	13 May 1975; Louveciennes, France	Charles DuBois Coryell (1912–1971)	1957
	Gerty Theresa Radnitz-Cori	15 August 1896; Prague, Czech Republic	26 October 1957; Glendale, Missouri, United States	Frederick Sanger (1918–2013)	1954
	Gerty Theresa Radnitz-Cori	15 August 1896; Prague, Czech Republic	26 October 1957; Glendale, Missouri, United States	Vincent du Vigneaud (1901–1978)	1954
	Salli Eskola	12 May 1906; Lammi, Finland	11 October 1994; Helsinki, Finland	Johan Arvid Hedvall (1888–1974)	1956
	Salli Eskola	12 May 1906; Lammi, Finland	11 October 1994; Helsinki, Finland	Karl Freudenberg (1886–1983)	1957
	Salli Eskola	12 May 1906; Lammi, Finland	11 October 1994; Helsinki, Finland	Robert Burns Woodward (1917–1979)	1960, 1962, 1963
	Irena Chmielewska	13 July 1905; Łódź, Poland	17 January 1987; Warsaw, Poland	Melvin Calvin (1911–1997)	1957
	Antonia Elisabeth Korvezee	8 March 1899; Wijnaldum, Netherlands	17 January 1978; The Hague, Netherlands	Wilhelm Gerhard Burgers (1897–1988)	1960
	Carolina Henriette MacGillavry	22 January 1904; Amsterdam, Netherlands	9 May 1993; Amsterdam, Netherlands	Johannes Martin Bijvoet (1892–1980)	1961, 1966
	Maria Lipp	6 April 1892; Stolberg, Germany	12 December 1966; Aachen, Germany	Karl Ziegler (1898–1973)	1961
	Eva Philbin	4 January 1914; Ballina, County Mayo, Ireland	24 June 2005; Dublin, Ireland	Christopher Kelk Ingold (1893–1970)	1964
	Dorothy Crowfoot Hodgkin	12 May 1910; Cairo, Egypt	29 July 1994; Ilmington, United Kingdom	Johannes Martin Bijvoet (1892–1980)	1966, 1970
	Maria Goeppert Mayer	28 June 1906; Katowice, Poland	20 February 1972; San Diego, California, United States	Lars Onsager (1903–1976)	1966, 1967
	Maria Goeppert Mayer	28 June 1906; Katowice, Poland	20 February 1972; San Diego, California, United States	Martin Kamen (1913–2002)	1970
	Erika Cremer	20 May 1900; Munich, Germany	21 September 1996; Innsbruck, Austria	Erwin Wilhelm Müller (1911–1977)	1967
	Erika Cremer	20 May 1900; Munich, Germany	21 September 1996; Innsbruck, Austria	Ivan Stranski (1897–1979)	1967
	Erika Cremer	20 May 1900; Munich, Germany	21 September 1996; Innsbruck, Austria	Klaus Biemann (1926–2016)	1970
	Inga Fischer-Hjalmars	16 January 1918; Stockholm, Sweden	17 September 2008; Lidingö, Sweden	Gerhard Herzberg (1904–1999)	1970

== Physiology or Medicine ==
For the physiology or medicine prize, the following individuals are entitled to nominate:

- 1. Members of the Nobel Assembly at Karolinska Institutet, Stockholm;
- 2. Swedish and foreign members of the Medicine and Biology classes of the Royal Swedish Academy of Sciences;
- 3. Nobel Prize laureates in physiology or medicine and chemistry;
- 4. Members of the Nobel Committee not qualified in the first paragraph;
- 5. Holders of established posts as full professors at the faculties of medicine in Sweden and holders of similar posts at the faculties of medicine or similar institutions in Denmark, Finland, Iceland and Norway;
- 6. Holders of similar posts at no fewer than six other faculties of medicine at universities around the world, selected by the Nobel Assembly, with a view to ensuring the appropriate distribution of the task among various countries.
- 7. Scientists whom the Nobel Assembly may otherwise see fit to approach.

Image	Nominator	Born	Died	Nominees	Citation	Year(s) Nominated
Physiology or Medicine
	Florence Rena Sabin	9 November 1871; Central City, Colorado, United States	3 October 1953; Denver, Colorado, United States	Jacques Loeb (1859–1924)	"for the work Proteins and the theory of colloidal behavior.	1924
	Florence Rena Sabin	9 November 1871; Central City, Colorado, United States	3 October 1953; Denver, Colorado, United States	Oswald Avery (1877–1955)	"for his chemo-immunological studies on conjugated carbohydrate proteins."	1932, 1939
	Florence Rena Sabin	9 November 1871; Central City, Colorado, United States	3 October 1953; Denver, Colorado, United States	Michael Heidelberger (1888–1991)	"for his work on the chemical nature and immunochemical significance of the polysaccharides in pneumococci."	1939
	Cécile Vogt-Mugnier	27 March 1875; Annecy, France	4 May 1962; Cambridge, United Kingdom	Thomas Hunt Morgan (1866–1945)	"for his work on genetics, gene mutations, phenotypical divergencies, the demonstration of three coupling groups in the genes of Drosophila."	1932
	Cécile Vogt-Mugnier	27 March 1875; Annecy, France	4 May 1962; Cambridge, United Kingdom	Hermann Joseph Muller (1890–1967)	"for his work on genetics, "crossing over", lethal factors, the demonstration of a fourth coupling group in the genes of Drosophila, the effect of temperature changes and X-rays on the mutation rate."	1932
	Ellen James Patterson	United States	United States	Chevalier Jackson (1865–1958)	"for his work on bronchoscopy, laryngology, esophagoscopy and gastroscopy.	1935
	Anne Bourquin	United States	United States	Hans Christian Hagedorn (1888–1971)	"for his work on and discovery of protamine insulinate."	1937
	Gladys Marchant	India	United Kingdom	William Burridge (?)	"for his work on natural stimulation and excitability."	1937
	Leslie Webster	United States	United States	John Howard Northrop (1891–1987)	"for the purification, crystallization and method of action of pepsin and trypsin; purification of their pro-enzymes."	1939
	Leslie Webster	United States	United States	James Batcheller Sumner (1887–1955)	"for the purification and crystallization of the enzyme urease and the study of its action."	1939
	Esther Killick	3 May 1902; Ilford, United Kingdom	31 May 1960; London, United Kingdom	John Boyd Orr (1880–1971)	"for his work on nutritional physiology, and the importance of the application of these findings to human health and nutrition."	1947
	Meredith Fairfax Campbell	1894; United States	1968; United States	Homer William Smith (1895–1962)	"for the new concepts of kidney physiology: quantitative methods for measuring glomerular filtration rate and maximal tubular excretory and re-absorptive capacities."	1948
	Gerty Theresa Radnitz-Cori	15 August 1896; Prague, Czech Republic	26 October 1957; Glendale, Missouri, United States	Hans Adolf Krebs (1900–1981)	"for the discovery of the mechanism of urea formation in mammals, oxidative decomposition of d-amino acids and carbohydrates."	1949, 1952, 1953
	Gerty Theresa Radnitz-Cori	15 August 1896; Prague, Czech Republic	26 October 1957; Glendale, Missouri, United States	Chester Hamlin Werkman (1893–1962)	"for the discovery of the fixation of carbon dioxide by cells which do not contain chlorophyll."	1949
	Gerty Theresa Radnitz-Cori	15 August 1896; Prague, Czech Republic	26 October 1957; Glendale, Missouri, United States	Harland Goff Wood (1907–1991)	"for the discovery of the fixation of carbon dioxide by cells which do not contain chlorophyll."	1949
	Gerty Theresa Radnitz-Cori	15 August 1896; Prague, Czech Republic	26 October 1957; Glendale, Missouri, United States	Fritz Albert Lipmann (1899–1986)	"for his discovery of the role of phosphate-linked energy in biological synthesis and the role of panthotenic acid as a coenzyme."	1953
	Olga Bridgman	30 March 1886; Jackson, Michigan, United States	6 February 1974; San Mateo, California, United States	Karl Friedrich Meyer (1884–1974)	"for his work on brucellosis, coccidioidomycosis, encephalitis, and botulismus."	1950
	Hanna Hirszfeldowa	17 July 1884; Wrocław, Poland	20 February 1964; Wrocław, Poland	Robert Debré (1882–1978)		1953

== Literature ==
The Nobel Committee of the Swedish Academy sends invitation letters to persons who are qualified to nominate for the Nobel Prize in Literature. The following individuals are eligible forwarding nominations:

- 1. Members of the Swedish Academy and of other academies, institutions and societies which are similar to it in construction and purpose;
- 2. Professors of literature and of linguistics at universities and university colleges;
- 3. Previous Nobel Prize laureates in literature;
- 4. Presidents of those societies of authors that are representative of the literary production in their respective countries.

Image	Nominator	Born	Died	Nominees	Year(s) Nominated
Literature
	Mary Augusta Ward	11 June 1851; Hobart, Australia	24 March 1920; London, United Kingdom	George Meredith (1828–1909)	1902, 1907
	Alice Stopford Green	30 May 1847; Kells, County Meath, Ireland	28 May 1929; Dublin, Ireland	John Morley (1838–1923)	1902
	Caroline Borden	United States	United States	Borden Parker Bowne (1847–1910)	1906
	Edith Nesbith-Bland	15 August 1858; Kennington, Surrey, United Kingdom	4 May 1924; New Romney, Kent, United Kingdom	Andrew Lang (1844–1912)	1910
	Selma Lagerlöf	20 November 1858; Sunne, Sweden	16 March 1940; Sunne, Sweden	Georg Brandes (1842–1927)	1920, 1922
	Edith Morley	13 September 1875; Bayswater, London, United Kingdom	18 January 1964; Reading, Berkshire, United Kingdom	Thomas Hardy (1840–1928)	1920
	Helga Eng	31 May 1875; Rakkestad, Norway	26 May 1966; Oslo, Norway	Sigrid Undset (1882–1949)	1928
	Helga Eng	31 May 1875; Rakkestad, Norway	26 May 1966; Oslo, Norway	Olav Duun (1876–1939)	1931, 1932, 1933, 1934, 1935, 1936, 1937
	Sofia Antoniadou	Greece	Greece	Kostis Palamas (1859–1943)	1936
	Pearl Sydenstricker Buck	26 June 1892; Hillsboro, West Virginia, United States	6 March 1973; Danby, Vermont, United States	Lin Yutang (1895–1976)	1940, 1950
	Pearl Sydenstricker Buck	26 June 1892; Hillsboro, West Virginia, United States	6 March 1973; Danby, Vermont, United States	Van Wyck Brooks (1886–1963)	1952
	Pearl Sydenstricker Buck	26 June 1892; Hillsboro, West Virginia, United States	6 March 1973; Danby, Vermont, United States	Jun'ichirō Tanizaki (1886–1965)	1958
	Pearl Sydenstricker Buck	26 June 1892; Hillsboro, West Virginia, United States	6 March 1973; Danby, Vermont, United States	Robert Frost (1874–1963)	1961
	Eugenia Kielland	23 April 1878; Skedsmo, Norway	7 April 1969; Oslo, Norway	Johan Falkberget (1879–1967)	1945
	Elin Wägner	16 May 1882; Lund, Sweden	7 January 1949; Växjö, Sweden	Gabriela Mistral (1889–1957)	1945
	Elin Wägner	16 May 1882; Lund, Sweden	7 January 1949; Växjö, Sweden	Angelos Sikelianos (1884–1951)	1948
	Greta Hedin	21 March 1889; Gothenburg, Sweden	14 June 1949; Uppsala, Sweden	Edward Morgan Forster (1879–1970)	1945
	Louise Rosenblatt	23 August 1904; Atlantic City, New Jersey, United States	8 February 2005; Arlington County, Virginia, United States	Horace Kallen (1882–1974)	1947
	Sigrid Undset	20 May 1882; Kalundborg, Norway	10 June 1949; Lillehammer, Norway	Johan Falkberget (1879–1967)	1948
	Gabriela Mistral	7 April 1889; Vicuña, Chile	10 January 1957; Hempstead, New York, United States	Alfonso Reyes (1889–1959)	1949
	Gabriela Mistral	7 April 1889; Vicuña, Chile	10 January 1957; Hempstead, New York, United States	Alberto Hidalgo (1897–1967)	1953
	Mary Elizabeth Morton	1876; Ireland	1957; Ireland	Seán O'Casey (1880–1964)	1950
	Kersti Bergroth	24 January 1886; Vyborg, Russia	24 January 1975; Helsinki, Finland	Albert Steffen (1884–1963)	1950
	Margot Arce de Vázquez	10 March 1904; Caguas, Puerto Rico	14 November 1990; San Juan, Puerto Rico	Rómulo Gallegos (1884–1969)	1951
	Julia Braschi	Puerto Rico	Puerto Rico	Rómulo Gallegos (1884–1969)	1951
	Asta Kihlbom	21 March 1892; Mariestad, Sweden	15 January 1984; Lund, Sweden	Winston Churchill (1874–1965)	1952
	Gladys Willcock	United States	United States	Edith Sitwell (1887–1964)	1955
	Gladys Turquet-Milnes	21 April 1887; Wandsworth, Surrey, United Kingdom	17 January 1977; London, United Kingdom	André Malraux (1901–1976)	1955
	Amelia Agostini de Del Río	1896; Yauco, Puerto Rico	11 December 1996; Spring Lake, New Jersey, United States	Ramón Menéndez Pidal (1869–1968)	1956
	María Rosa Lida de Malkiel	7 November 1910; Buenos Aires, Argentina	25 September 1962; Oakland, California, United States	Ramón Menéndez Pidal (1869–1968)	1956
	Leonida Biancolini	Spain	Spain	Ramón Menéndez Pidal (1869–1968)	1956
	Alfonsina Braun	1906; Italy	1970; Italy	Ramón Menéndez Pidal (1869–1968)	1956
	María Concepción Zardoya	14 November 1914; Valparaíso, Chile	21 April 2004; Madrid, Spain	Ramón Menéndez Pidal (1869–1968)	1956
	Odette Bornand	France	France	Georges Duhamel (1884–1966)	1956
	Jacqueline Duchemin	20 May 1910; Bayonne, Pyrénées-Atlantiques, France	19 November 1988; Labenne, Landes, France	Georges Duhamel (1884–1966)	1956
	Jacqueline Duchemin	20 May 1910; Bayonne, Pyrénées-Atlantiques, France	19 November 1988; Labenne, Landes, France	Pierre Emmanuel (1916–1984)	1966
	Jacqueline Duchemin	20 May 1910; Bayonne, Pyrénées-Atlantiques, France	19 November 1988; Labenne, Landes, France	Léopold Sédar Senghor (1906–2001)	1969
	Marie-Jeanne Durry	25 March 1901; Paris, France	2 June 1980; Paris, France	Marthe Bibesco (1886–1973)	1956
	Anna Hyatt Huntington	10 March 1876; Cambridge, Massachusetts, United States	4 October 1973; Redding, Connecticut, United States	Armand Godoy (1880–1964)	1956
	Ingerid Dal	2 August 1895; Drammen, Norway	17 February 1985; Oslo, Norway	André Schwarz-Bart (1928–2006)	1962
	Elizabeth Hill	24 October 1900; St. Petersburg, Russia	17 December 1996; London, United Kingdom	Vladimir Nabokov (1899–1977)	1964, 1968
	Greta Hort	25 May 1903; Copenhagen, Denmark	19 August 1967; Risskov, Aarhus, Denmark	Judith Wright (1915–2000)	1964, 1965
	Maria Villavecchia Bellonci	30 November 1902; Rome, Italy	13 May 1986; Rome, Italy	Carlo Levi (1902–1975)	1966
	Maria Villavecchia Bellonci	30 November 1902; Rome, Italy	13 May 1986; Rome, Italy	Alberto Moravia (1907–1990)	1966
	Maria Villavecchia Bellonci	30 November 1902; Rome, Italy	13 May 1986; Rome, Italy	Giuseppe Ungaretti (1888–1970)	1969
	Barbara Hardy	27 June 1924; Swansea, Wales, United Kingdom	12 February 2016; London, United Kingdom	Samuel Beckett (1906–1989)	1967
	Barbara Hardy	27 June 1924; Swansea, Wales, United Kingdom	12 February 2016; London, United Kingdom	Wystan Hugh Auden (1907–1973)	1970, 1971
	Nelly Sachs	10 December 1891; Berlin, Germany	12 May 1970; Stockholm, Sweden	Samuel Beckett (1906–1989)	1967, 1968
	Berta Moritz-Siebeck	1912; Germany	1989; Germany	Ezra Pound (1885–1972)	1967
	Mary Durack Miller	20 February 1913; Adelaide, South Australia, Australia	16 December 1994; Nedlands, Western Australia, Australia	Judith Wright (1915–2000)	1967
	Muriel Clara Bradbrook	27 April 1909; Birkenhead, United Kingdom	11 June 1993; Cambridge, United Kingdom	Patrick White (1912–1990)	1968, 1970
	Kristine Heltberg	12 July 1924; Warsaw, Poland	7 June 2003; Copenhagen, Denmark	Jerzy Andrzejewski (1909–1983)	1969
	Anna Kamenova	31 December 1894; Plovdiv, Bulgaria	1 August 1982; Sofia, Bulgaria	Elisaveta Bagryana (1893–1991)	1969
	Helen Louise Gardner	13 February 1908; Finchley, London, United Kingdom	4 June 1986; Bicester, Cherwell, United Kingdom	Jorge Luis Borges (1899–1986)	1969, 1970
	Beatrice Miller White	20 March 1908; California, United States	15 April 1995; Santa Clara, California, United States	Robert Graves (1895–1985)	1969
	Mary Renault	4 September 1905; Forest Gate, Essex, United Kingdom	13 December 1983; Cape Town, South Africa	Graham Greene (1904–1991)	1970, 1971
	Jara Ribnikar	23 August 1912; Hradec Králové, Czech Republic	30 April 2007; Belgrade, Serbia	Miroslav Krleža (1893–1981)	1970
	Jara Ribnikar	23 August 1912; Hradec Králové, Czech Republic	30 April 2007; Belgrade, Serbia	Saul Bellow (1915–2005)	1971
	Gerd Høst-Heyerdahl	28 March 1915; Oslo, Norway	1 March 2007; Oslo, Norway	Erich Kästner (1899–1974)	1970
	Gerd Høst-Heyerdahl	28 March 1915; Oslo, Norway	1 March 2007; Oslo, Norway	Elie Wiesel (1928–2016)	1971
	Hilde Spiel	19 October 1911; Vienna, Austria	30 November 1990; Vienna, Austria	Alexander Lernet-Holenia (1897–1976)	1970
	Josephine Louise Miles	11 June 1911; Chicago, Illinois, United States	12 May 1985; Berkeley, California, United States	Pablo Neruda (1904–1973)	1970, 1971
	Petronella Maria Boer-den Hoed	6 July 1899; Leiden, Netherlands	28 January 1973; Amsterdam, Netherlands	Simon Vestdijk (1898–1971)	1970
	Hesba Fay Brinsmead	15 March 1922; Berambing, New South Wales, Australia	24 November 2003; Murwillumbah, New South Wales, Australia	Patrick White (1912–1990)	1970
	Eeva Kilpi	18 February 1928; Khiytola, Karelia, Russia	—N/a	Jerzy Andrzejewski (1909–1983)	1971
	Eeva Kilpi	18 February 1928; Khiytola, Karelia, Russia	—N/a	Paavo Haavikko (1931–2008)	1971
	Eeva Kilpi	18 February 1928; Khiytola, Karelia, Russia	—N/a	Väinö Linna (1920–1992)	1971
	Meta Mayne Reid	1905; Woodlesford, Yorkshire, United Kingdom	1990; Crawfordsburn, County Down, United Kingdom	William Golding (1911–1993)	1971
	Petronella O'Flanagan	Ireland	Ireland	Arthur Miller (1915–2005)	1971
	Petronella O'Flanagan	Ireland	Ireland	Henry Williamson (1895–1977)	1971
	Pacita Icasiano-Habana	Philippines	17 August 2016; Philippines	José García Villa (1908–1997)	1971

== Peace ==
According to the statutes of the Nobel Foundation, a nomination is considered valid if it is submitted by a person or a group of people who falls within one of the following categories:

- 1. Members of national assemblies and national governments (cabinet members/ministers) of sovereign states as well as current heads of states;
- 2. Members of The International Court of Justice and The Permanent Court of Arbitration in The Hague;
- 3. Members of Institut de Droit International;
- 4. Members of the international board of the Women's International League for Peace and Freedom;
- 5. University professors, professors emeriti and associate professors of history, social sciences, law, philosophy, theology, and religion; university rectors and university directors (or their equivalents);
- 6. Directors of peace research institutes and foreign policy institutes;
- 6. Persons who have been awarded the Nobel Peace Prize;
- 7. Members of the main board of directors or its equivalent of organizations that have been awarded the Nobel Peace Prize;
- 8. Current and former members of the Norwegian Nobel Committee (proposals by current members of the Committee to be submitted no later than at the first meeting of the Committee after 1 February);
- 9. Former advisers to the Norwegian Nobel Committee.

Image	Nominator	Born	Died	Nominees	Year(s) Nominated
Peace
	Ellen Robinson	14 March 1840; Derby, Derbyshire, United Kingdom	6 March 1912; Liverpool, United Kingdom	Élie Ducommun (1833–1906)	1901
	Ellen Robinson	14 March 1840; Derby, Derbyshire, United Kingdom	6 March 1912; Liverpool, United Kingdom	Permanent International Peace Bureau (founded in 1891)	1902, 1907
	Ellen Robinson	14 March 1840; Derby, Derbyshire, United Kingdom	6 March 1912; Liverpool, United Kingdom	Bertha von Suttner (1843–1914)	1903, 1904, 1905
	Ellen Robinson	14 March 1840; Derby, Derbyshire, United Kingdom	6 March 1912; Liverpool, United Kingdom	Edvard Wavrinsky (1848–1924)	1906
	Bertha Sophie von Suttner	9 June 1843; Prague, Czech Republic	21 June 1914; Vienna, Austria	Frédéric Passy (1822–1912)	1901
	Bertha Sophie von Suttner	9 June 1843; Prague, Czech Republic	21 June 1914; Vienna, Austria	Élie Ducommun (1833–1906)	1902
	Bertha Sophie von Suttner	9 June 1843; Prague, Czech Republic	21 June 1914; Vienna, Austria	Fredrik Bajer (1837–1922)	1904, 1906, 1907
	Bertha Sophie von Suttner	9 June 1843; Prague, Czech Republic	21 June 1914; Vienna, Austria	Édouard Descamps (1847–1933)	1904, 1905
	Bertha Sophie von Suttner	9 June 1843; Prague, Czech Republic	21 June 1914; Vienna, Austria	Paul Henri Balluet d'Estournelles de Constant (1852–1924)	1909
	Bertha Sophie von Suttner	9 June 1843; Prague, Czech Republic	21 June 1914; Vienna, Austria	Thomas Barclay (1853–1941)	1910
	Bertha Sophie von Suttner	9 June 1843; Prague, Czech Republic	21 June 1914; Vienna, Austria	Alfred Hermann Fried (1864–1921)	1911
	Bertha Sophie von Suttner	9 June 1843; Prague, Czech Republic	21 June 1914; Vienna, Austria	Otto Umfrid (1857–1920)	1914
	Helene Stöcker	13 November 1869; Elberfeld, Wuppertal, Germany	24 February 1943; Riverside Drive, New York City, New York, United States	Emil Strauss (1866–1960)	1903
	Helene Stöcker	13 November 1869; Elberfeld, Wuppertal, Germany	24 February 1943; Riverside Drive, New York City, New York, United States	Jane Addams (1860–1935)	1925, 1930
	Helene Stöcker	13 November 1869; Elberfeld, Wuppertal, Germany	24 February 1943; Riverside Drive, New York City, New York, United States	Ludwig Quidde (1858–1941)	1925
	Helene Stöcker	13 November 1869; Elberfeld, Wuppertal, Germany	24 February 1943; Riverside Drive, New York City, New York, United States	Herbert Runham Brown (1879–1949)	1932
	Helene Stöcker	13 November 1869; Elberfeld, Wuppertal, Germany	24 February 1943; Riverside Drive, New York City, New York, United States	War Resisters' International (founded 1921)	1933
	Helene Stöcker	13 November 1869; Elberfeld, Wuppertal, Germany	24 February 1943; Riverside Drive, New York City, New York, United States	Carl von Ossietzky (1889–1938)	1935, 1936
	Helene Stöcker	13 November 1869; Elberfeld, Wuppertal, Germany	24 February 1943; Riverside Drive, New York City, New York, United States	Permanent International Peace Bureau (founded 1891)	1935
	Helene Stöcker	13 November 1869; Elberfeld, Wuppertal, Germany	24 February 1943; Riverside Drive, New York City, New York, United States	Relief Committee for Exiled Pacifists (founded 1936)	1937, 1939
	Belva Ann Bennett Lockwood	October 24, 1830; Royalton, New York, United States	May 19, 1917; Washington, D.C., United States	Universal Peace Union (founded 1888)	1904, 1906, 1908, 1910
	Belva Ann Bennett Lockwood	October 24, 1830; Royalton, New York, United States	May 19, 1917; Washington, D.C., United States	American Peace Society (founded 1828)	1908
	Anna Zipernowsky	Hungary	Hungary	Gaston Moch (1859–1935)	1911, 1912, 1913, 1914
	Anna Zipernowsky	Hungary	Hungary	Alfred Hermann Fried (1864–1921)	1911
	Anna Zipernowsky	Hungary	Hungary	Felix Moscheles (1833–1917)	1912, 1913, 1914
	Anna Zipernowsky	Hungary	Hungary	International Socialist Bureau (founded 1900)	1913
	Anna Zipernowsky	Hungary	Hungary	Rosika Schwimmer (1877–1948)	1917
	Anna Zipernowsky	Hungary	Hungary	Benjamin de Jong van Beek en Donk (1881–1948)	1919
	Ángela de Oliveira Cézar de Costa	ca. 1860; Entre Ríos Province, Argentina	June 25, 1940; Buenos Aires, Argentina	South American Universal Peace Association	1911
	Fannie Fern Andrews	25 September 1867; Middleton, Nova Scotia, Canada	23 January 1950; Somerville, Massachusetts, United States	Woodrow Wilson (1856–1924)	1919
	Fannie Fern Andrews	25 September 1867; Middleton, Nova Scotia, Canada	23 January 1950; Somerville, Massachusetts, United States	Warren G. Harding (1865–1923)	1923
	Fannie Fern Andrews	25 September 1867; Middleton, Nova Scotia, Canada	23 January 1950; Somerville, Massachusetts, United States	Norman Angell (1872–1967)	1933
	Margaret Wintringham	4 August 1879; Keighley, West Riding of Yorkshire, United Kingdom	10 March 1955; London, United Kingdom	Jane Addams (1860–1935)	1923
	Nelly Thüring	21 June 1875; Vankiva, Sweden	2 January 1972; Enskede-Årsta-Vantör, Stockholm, Sweden	Jane Addams (1860–1935)	1923
	Margaret Bondfield	17 March 1873; Chard, Somerset, United Kingdom	16 June 1953; Sanderstead, South Croydon, United Kingdom	Edmund Dene Morel (1873–1924)	1924
	Matilda Widegren	7 August 1863; Söderköping, Sweden	2 February 1938; Stockholm, Sweden	Jane Addams (1860–1935)	1925, 1930, 1931
	Matilda Widegren	7 August 1863; Söderköping, Sweden	2 February 1938; Stockholm, Sweden	Carl Lindhagen (1860–1946)	1930
	Henriette Wurmová	Czech Republic	Czech Republic	Edvard Beneš (1884–1948)	1927, 1938
	Henriette Wurmová	Czech Republic	Czech Republic	Tomáš Masaryk (1850–1937)	1929, 1930, 1936, 1937
	Henriette Wurmová	Czech Republic	Czech Republic	International Union of Associations for the League of Nations (founded 1919)	1931
	Henriette Wurmová	Czech Republic	Czech Republic	Permanent International Peace Bureau (founded 1891)	1938
	Anna Margarete Stegmann	12 July 1871; Zürich, Switzerland	1 July 1936; Arlesheim, Switzerland	Auguste Forel (1848–1931)	1928
	Augusta Rosenberg	26 August 1894; Vienna, Austria	1982; Hungary	Permanent International Peace Bureau (founded 1891)	1929
	Augusta Rosenberg	26 August 1894; Vienna, Austria	1982; Hungary	Harold Harmsworth (1868–1940)	1930
	Augusta Rosenberg	26 August 1894; Vienna, Austria	1982; Hungary	Ishbel Hamilton-Gordon (1857–1939)	1931
	Augusta Rosenberg	26 August 1894; Vienna, Austria	1982; Hungary	Arthur Henderson (1863–1935)	1933
	Augusta Rosenberg	26 August 1894; Vienna, Austria	1982; Hungary	Disarmament Committee of the Women's International Organizations (founded 1931)	1934
	Augusta Rosenberg	26 August 1894; Vienna, Austria	1982; Hungary	Carl von Ossietzky (1889–1938)	1936
	Františka Plamínková	5 February 1875; Prague, Czechia	30 June 1942; Prague, Czechia	Ishbel Hamilton-Gordon (1857–1939)	1931
	Elisa Petersen	3 January 1876; Aarhus, Denmark	7 September 1932; Copenhagen, Denmark	Ishbel Hamilton-Gordon (1857–1939)	1931, 1932
	Caroline Playne	2 May 1857; Avening, Gloucestershire, United Kingdom	27 January 1948; Hampstead, London, United Kingdom	Permanent International Peace Bureau (founded 1891)	1931
	Caroline Playne	2 May 1857; Avening, Gloucestershire, United Kingdom	27 January 1948; Hampstead, London, United Kingdom	Carl von Ossietzky (1889–1938)	1936
	Caroline Playne	2 May 1857; Avening, Gloucestershire, United Kingdom	27 January 1948; Hampstead, London, United Kingdom	Relief Committee for Exiled Pacifists (founded 1936)	1937
	Caroline Playne	2 May 1857; Avening, Gloucestershire, United Kingdom	27 January 1948; Hampstead, London, United Kingdom	Neville Chamberlain (1869–1940)	1939
	Kristina Hasselgren	3 October 1920; Stockholm, Sweden	3 May 2003; Stockholm, Sweden	Ishbel Hamilton-Gordon (1857–1939)	1932, 1934
	Augusta Stang	11 December 1869; Oslo, Norway	11 February 1944; Oslo, Norway	Ishbel Hamilton-Gordon (1857–1939)	1932
