= Vibeke Salicath =

Danish women's rights activist and suffragist

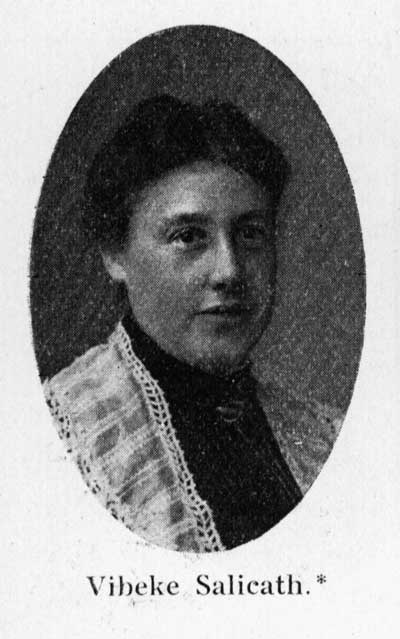
Vibeke Salicath

Vibeke Ingeborg Salicath née Frisch (1861–1921) was a Danish philanthropist, feminist and politician. From the 1890s, together with her sister Gyrithe Lemche, she was an active member of the Danish Women's Society where from 1901 she edited Kvinden & Samfundet.

== Early life and family ==
Born in Copenhagen on 1 August 1861, Vibeke Ingeborg Frisch was the daughter of the headmaster Hartvig Frisch (1833–90) and Elisabeth Alexandra Mourier (1835–92). She was the elder sister of the feminist Gyrithe Lemche (1866–1945). On 18 October 1884, she married the translator Gerhard Guise Salicath (1859–1937) with whom she had six children, most of whom died as children: Constance Frederikke (1885), Erik (1886–88), Viggo (1887–88), Peter (1891–98), and the twins Karen and Kirsten Emilie (1902), Karen being the only one to survive infancy.

She was raised in a comfortable environment in Lyngby where her family moved to Wilhelminelyst when she was still young. It was there she met Gerhard Salicath whom she married in 1884. The couple moved to more modest accommodation on Copenhagen's Vesterbro. After a series of family problems, she left her husband in 1903 but refused his request for a divorce.

== Professional life ==
It was together with another single mother, the journalist Valborg Andersen, that Salicath founded the women's hostel Kvindeherberget in 1902, later known as Kvindehjemmet in the Nørrebro district of Copenhagen. Providing philanthropic services for unmarried mothers with children, the institution's innovative approach helped to change attitudes towards single women in unfortunate circumstances.

In the 1890s, Salicath had become a member of the Women's Society, encouraging her sisters Gyrithe and Asta to join too. She was a board member of the organization's Copenhagen chapter from 1900, becoming vice-president in 1905. She became editor of Kvinden & Samfundet in 1901, but also contributed articles to other women's journals including Kvindernes Blad, Frou-Frou, Husmoderens Blad and Hjemmet.

As an active player in the Danish women's movement, women's suffrage became her primary concern, especially after she had participated in the 1904 Berlin Conference of the International Council of Women, where the International Woman Suffrage Alliance was launched. From 1907 to 1908, succeeding Louise Nørlund, she headed the Women's Society's Suffrage Union.

Representing the conservative party Højre, she was one of the first seven women to be elected to the Copenhagen City Council (Borgerrepræsentationen) in 1909, where she took a particular interest in the Nærumgård children's home. In 1914, she co-founded the Danish Women's Conservative Association (Danske Kvinders Konservative Forening).

Vibeke Salicath died in Copenhagen on 22 April 1921. She is buried in Lyngby's Assistens Cemetery.
