= Kommittén för ökad kvinnorepresentation =

Swedish women's association

Kommittén för ökad kvinnorepresentation (Literary: 'The committee for increased women's representation'), also known as Den ökade ('The Increasing') for short, was a Swedish women's association, founded in 1937. It worked for an increased representation of women on all levels of the political system.

== History ==
=== Background ===
Women in Sweden were given municipal suffrage in 1862 and municipal eligibility in 1909, followed by national suffrage and eligibility in 1921. The first 38 women were elected to local councils in the 1910 local elections, and the first five women were elected in to the national parliament the Riksdag in 1921 Swedish general election. In 1927 the Svenska Kvinnors Medborgarförbund founded the campaign group Föreningen Kvinnolistan to campaign for an increased representation of women in political office by supporting their own female independent candidates in the 1928 election, without much success.

=== Foundation and activity ===
In the 1930s, women were represented on most political levels in Sweden, but in low numbers, deemed insufficient by the women's movement; a common scenario was that each political level had but one "obligatory woman" who was then made to represent women and given all assignments given to women on that level, thus making the political participation and advancement of women on a low level. The situation was similar in Denmark, where the Dansk Kvindesamfund founded the campaign group Kvinders politiske Samraad under Ingrid Larsen to address the issue in 1936.

The Kommittén för ökad kvinnorepresentation was founded on the initiative of the Fredrika Bremer Association. It worked with a number of non-political women's organizations to influence the political parties to appoint more women for political office, and encouraged women to engaged in formal party politics. However, since it wished to remain politically neutral and not affiliated with a political party, it refused direct cooperation with the women's wings of the political parties, which may have made it less effective than what may otherwise have been the case. The association had achieved some moderate success when it was dissolved in 1948. The number of women in the Riksdag in 1948 was double the amount it had been in 1937, but it was still low.

Its members included Hanna Rydh (Chairperson during the entire existence of the organization) and Axianne Thorstensson, described as the two leading members, as well as Karin Kock, Alva Myrdal and the secretaries Brita Åkerman Johansson, Birgitta von Hofsten and Astrid Westergren.

=== Aftermath ===
The campaign for increased political representation of women was followed by the Samarbetskommittén för ökad kvinnorepresentation (Literary: 'The Cooperation Committee for increased women's representation') in 1968. and in 1991 by the campaign of the Stödstrumporna (Literary: 'The Support stockings'), resulting in almost half of the elected officials to the Parliament being women in the 1994 Swedish general election.
