= Kvinden & Samfundet =

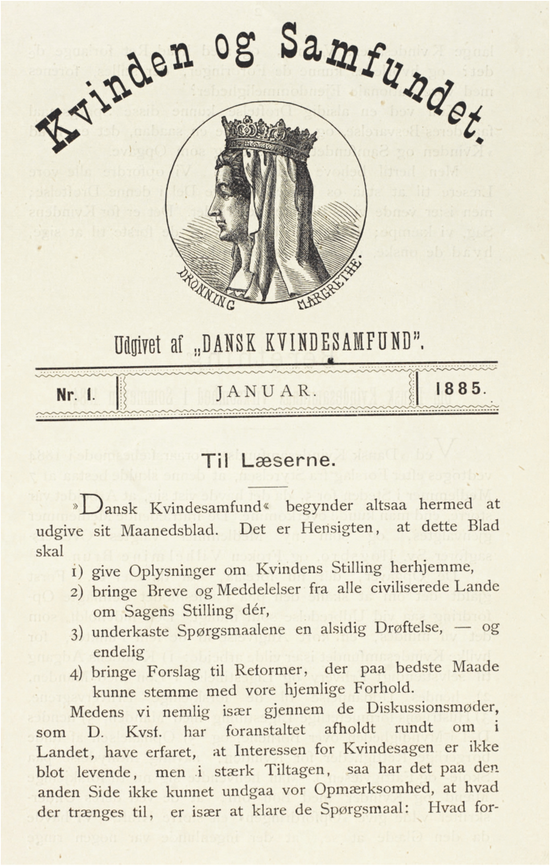
Cover of the first issue of Kvinden & Samfundet, published in January 1885

Kvinden & Samfundet (Woman & Society) is a Danish feminist magazine and the official publication of the Danish Women's Society. It has been published since 1885.

== History ==
The Danish Women's Society was founded in 1871 by Matilde Bajer and her husband Fredrik Bajer and the society's official magazine, Kvinden & Samfundet, was established in 1885. Its first editor, Elisabeth Grundtvig, headed the magazine from 1885 to 1886. Initially, the magazine focused on raising awareness of and generating debate about the position of women in Danish society. The first issue of the magazine set out four specific aims: to provide information about the status of Danish women; to publish accounts from "civilised countries" about the status of women and feminist movements abroad; to encourage debate from varied perspectives; and to propose reforms that would allow Danish women the right to vote (which was granted in 1915).

It was published 8–12 times a year until 1899, when its frequency increased to 22 issues per year. In 1899, the editors of Kvinden & Samfundet launched a campaign to increase their readership amongst working-class women by publishing a series of articles about their working and living conditions; over the next 15 years the journal closely followed developments in legislation of women's labour. From 1913 to 1919, the magazine was edited by Gyrithe Lemche, a writer and historian who also served on the executive committee of the Danish Women's Society. During the 1930s, the magazine and society were aligned with the Social Democrats party.

As the Danish Women's Society grew in size, Kvinden & Samfundet functioned as a method for members of the society around the country to stay in contact. Over time, as the feminist movement in Denmark progressed and gender inequality decreased, the magazine shifted its focus; its content now explores issues in gender, politics and culture from a party-neutral feminist perspective. Currently, the magazine is run by a team of volunteer editors. It is published five times yearly, with each issue costing 50 kr.

== Claims ==
On its website, Kvinden & Samfundet claims to be the oldest women's magazine in the world. In a 2013 book titled The Women's Movement in Protest, Institutions and the Internet, Swedish political scientist Drude Dahlerup wrote that Kvinden & Samfundet is probably the world's oldest feminist magazine.

== See also ==
- List of magazines in Denmark
