= Hansine Andræ =

Early Danish feminist (1817–1898)

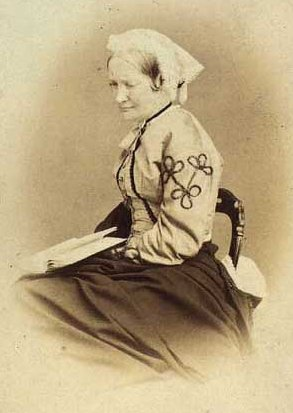
Hansine Andræ

Hansine Pouline Andræ née Schack (1817–1898) was an early Danish feminist who proposed changes to Denmark's marriage liturgy for the benefit of women. Her diaries (1854–58), reflecting her opinions on politics and parliamentary debates, provide a precious historical account of the times. They were published by her son Poul Andræ in three volumes from 1914 to 1920.

== Biography ==
Born on 5 April 1817 in Sengeløse to the west of Copenhagen, Hansine Pouline Schack was the daughter of Nicolai Clausen Schack (1781–1844), a provost, and Tagea Dorothea Erasmi (1785–1841). She was educated at Miss Zeuthen's girls boarding school until her father was appointed parish priest of Copenhagen's Church of Our Saviour in 1833. In 1842, she married the mathematician and politician Carl Christoffer Georg Andræ.

In the evenings, before going to bed, she recorded her opinions and impressions of political life in what became the diaries which were later published as Geheimeraadinde Andræs politiske Dagbøger. These reflected her husband's contacts and discussions with liberal politicians such as Andreas Frederik Krieger and Carl Christian Hall. Her accounts also commented on the proceedings of the Danish parliament, which she frequently attended, and the comments her husband made on his political negotiations. In his book on Kirkegaard in Golden Age Denmark, Bruce Kirmmse qualifies her as "very intelligent and politically shrewd". However, unlike her sister Marie Rovsing and her niece Tagea Johansen, she was not an open activist despite her firm feminist ideas. In 1879, she wrote to the women's rights activist Severine Casse (1805–98) in connection with a proposal from the Danish Women's Society to change the Church of Denmark's marriage ritual. Andræ called for a revision which would reduce the number of times a woman had to promise obedience to her husband to just one, writing: "What is the difference between having to say 'yes' once or ten times?... It seems to me that when women push for a change in the ritual, they should call for the removal of any reference to submissiveness." She did in fact live to see changes along these lines shortly before her death.

Hansine Andræ suffered a stroke in 1892 and died on 17 March 1898 in Copenhagen. She is buried in Assistens Cemetery.
