= Elisabeth Grundtvig =

Danish women's rights activist

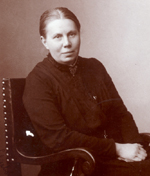
Elisabeth Grundtvig

Johanne Elisabeth Grundtvig (1856–1945) was a prominent Danish women's rights activist, parliamentary stenographer, leading member of the Danish Women's Society and editor of the organization's periodical Kvinden og Samfundet. In the 1880s, she was behind heated discussion on sexual morality calling for unmarried women to uphold their chastity.

== Biography ==
Born on 1 December 1856 in Copenhagen, Johanne Elisabeth Gtundtvig was the daughter of the archivist Johan Diderik Nicolaj Blicher Grundtvig (1822–1907) and Oline Vilhelmine Christiane Stenersen (1828–1893). She was the granddaughter of the influential philosopher N.F.S. Grundtvig.

She attended N. Zahle's School in Copenhagen where she qualified as a private school teacher in 1884 (although she never took up the teaching profession). In 1883, on the recommendation of the women's rights activist Severine Casse, she joined the Danish Women's Society, becoming editor of Kvinden og Samfundet, first for 1885–1886 and again from 1890 to 1894. Here she collaborated with Ida Falbe-Hansen who became her close companion until she died in 1922. As the periodical's first editor, she included articles on women's unequal legal status in marriage as well international perspectives on women's affairs, especially in regard to Scandinavia. In 1887–1889 and again in 1891–1892, she was a board member of the Society. She then became a member of the board for the Society's Copenhagen branch which she headed from 1895 to 1897.

In 1887, she caused considerable commotion in the Women's Society and beyond when she gave an address on "Nutidens sædelige Lighedskrav" (Moral Requirements of Our Times) which was published in Kvinden og Samfundet. Calling for premarital chastity, she attacked both men and women, maintaining that men should adopt women's "purer" approach to sexual morals. The article triggered an ironic response from Georg Brandes, the leading literary critic of the day, in the newspaper Politiken. Grundtvig successfully sued the paper, clearing herself of Brandes' allegations of fraud. While the outcome led to an increase in membership of the Women's Society, many continued to maintain that sex was not a relevant topic for the organization.

In 1890, Grundtvig took up stenography, becoming the first woman to take the parliamentary stenography exam. Despite considerable opposition, she was the first woman to be employed as a stenographer by the Danish parliament. She assisted Falbe-Hansen with the translation the works of the Swedish author Selma Lagerlöf until she died in 1922, later continuing the work herself.

Elisabeth Grundtvig died in the Frederiksberg district of Copenhagen on 10 February 1945.
