= Kvindevalgretsforeningen =

Danish women's organization

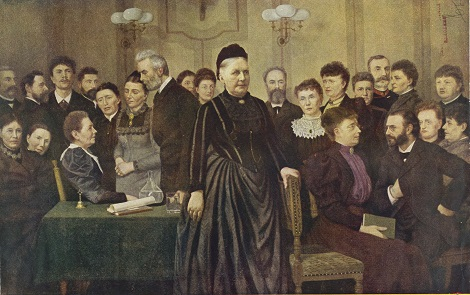
Line luplau seen in the foreground on her daughter Marie Luplau's large group portrait painting From the Early Days of the Fight for Women's Suffrage (1897).

Kvindevalgretsforeningen (KVF), or the Women's Suffrage Association, was a Danish organization established by Line Luplau in 1889 specifically to promote women's suffrage. The association not only organized meetings on voting rights but participated in electoral meetings, asking candidates how they felt about women's participation in provincial and national elections. The first meeting was held on 15 February 1889 with 1,500 participants. In addition to Luplau, Louise Nørlund and Johanne Meyer, there were also some prominent gentlemen in the audience, including Fredrik Bajer and Jens Christian Hostrup.

After the death of Luplau in 1891, interest in the organization diminished.

Nevertheless, in 1891 Louise Nørlund, who had assisted Luplaus from the start, became president of KVF but retired in 1893 to return to family life. Nielsine Nielsen then took over the presidency until 1898 when the organization was dissolved. Its interests were then taken over by the Copenhagen chapter of the Danish Women's Society.

Presidents

- 1889-1891: Line Luplau
- 1891-1893: Louise Nørlund
- 1893-1898: Nielsine Nielsen

== See also ==
- Kvindelig Fremskridtsforening (Women's Progress Association)
