= Grethe Fenger Møller =

Danish politician

Minister of Labour
- In office 10 September 1982 – 12 March 1986
- Monarch: Margrethe II
- Prime Minister: Poul Schlüter
- Preceded by: Svend Auken
- Succeeded by: Henning Dyremose

Member of the Folketing for Eastern Storkreds
- In office 15 February 1977 – 20 September 1994

Personal details
- Born: 6 November 1941 (age 84) Frederiksberg, Denmark
- Party: Conservative People's Party
- Education: Hamline University (1961–1962); University of Copenhagen (1962–1969)
- Occupation: Lawyer

Grethe Fenger Møller (born 6 November 1941) is a Danish lawyer and Conservative People's Party politician, who was elected to the Folketing as a representative of the Eastern Storkreds constituency from 1977 to 1994. She was the Minister of Labour in the first government of Poul Schlüter between 1982 and 1986. She was president of the Danish Women's Society from 1974 to 1981 after previously being on its executive committee and primary board. Møller left politics after being sentenced to probation for 60 days for providing false testimony in court about the Tamil Case and worked as a clerk in the Ministry of Social Affairs' international office until she retired in 2008.

== Early life ==
Møller was born in Frederiksberg, Denmark on 6 November 1941. She is the daughter of the department manager Torben Fenger Møller and his wife Ebba Møller. Møller was brought up in Frederiksberg; her parents were divorced when she was two years old and she lived with her mother and grandfather, who was the owner of a women's clothing store and was active politically. Her role model was the lawyer and politician Hanne Budtz. In 1961, she attended Marie Kruse's School and then relocated to the United States and enrolled at Hamline University in Minnesota for a year. Møller studied law at the University of Copenhagen from 1962 to 1969 and earned a Candidate of Law degree. During her studies, she joined the newly founded, anti-housewife, pro-abortion youth group of the Danish Women's Society (DWS) and was its deputy chair between 1965 and 1967.

== Career ==
Her mother gave her the inspiration to get involved in women's politics and her grandfather for party politics. In 1967, Møller gained election to the DWS' executive committee and primary board, and partook in activities for the Council for International Development Cooperation from that year until 1976. Two years later, she was employed as a secretary at the Ministry of Labor and Social Affairs. Møller became a member of The Conservative People's Party in 1970, and was made a member of the executive committee of the Committee for Accession to the Community in 1971. She became the DWS' national president in 1974 and that same year was elected to Frederiksberg Municipal Council. In 1975, Møller became part of the Conservative People's Party's main board, and was seconded by the Ministry of Social Affairs to the Office of the Prime Minister as head of the Secretariat for the Year of Women in the same year.

At the DWS, she had a gender equality policy of allowing men to have equal paternity leave and positive action for working women in the labour market and the education sector with the goal of better women's place in the labour industry. Membership of the DWS continued to decrease under Møller's presidency because of a large division between its home-working and away-working members and the Red Shirt movement's popularity among younger females. She continued to be the DWS president until 1981. Møller worked at the Secretariat of the Gender Equality Council between 1976 and 1979. From 1976 to 1977, she was a deputy member of the board of the Danish International Development Agency Information Committee and was a member of the Sparekassen SDS 'Board of Representatives until 1982 and was on the SDS' regional board for the Copenhagen-Zealand region between 1981 and 1982.

At the 1977 Danish general election held on 15 February of that year, Møller was elected to the Folketing for the first time as a representative of the Eastern Storkreds constituency for The Conservative People's Party. She worked as a clerk in the Ministry of Labor and Social Affairs between 1979 and 1982, was chair of the State Wages Council in 1982, and served as a councillor on Frederiksberg Municipal Council from 1981 to 1982. When Poul Schlüter established his first government in 1982, he appointed Møller as the Minister of Labour on 10 September 1982, which came as a surprise to many. This made her the first women to be made Minister of Labor in Denmark. While Minister of Labour, Møller attempted to locate savings and contribute to Denmark's recovery. She brought in cost-of-living regulation and savings on supplementary unemployment benefits. This caused a series of Danish-wide demonstrations and strikes that transgressed a collective agreement, beginning in October 1982 and ending in February 1983. Møller received criticism from several factions and she was sacked on 12 March 1986.

She was appointed the parliamentary group's political spokesperson for a year after that. Møller served as chair of the Ligestillingsrådet from 1987 to 1993. She was a member of the NATO Parliamentary Assembly starting in 1986. From 1987 to 1988, Møller was chair of the Parliamentary Health Committee and of the Parliamentary Legal Committee between 1988 and 1991. She got involved in the investigation of the Tamil Case in 1988 as chair of the Legal Affairs Committee. This led to Møller being unanimously convinced of providing false testimony in court for her role during a tax case in the Tamil Case in the Investigative Court and she received a sentence of probation for 60 days in 1994. She consequently lost her seat in the Folketing on 20 September 1994, and her other political positions. Møller then worked as a clerk in the Ministry of Social Affairs' international office until she retired in 2008.

== Personal life ==
She is a member of the Church of Denmark and attends church.
