= Eva Hansen =

Eva Hansen may refer to:

- Eva Hemmer Hansen (1913–1983), Danish journalist, novelist, translator and feminist
- Eva Kjer Hansen (born 1964), Danish politician
- Eva Kristin Hansen (born 1973), Norwegian politician
