= Ida Falbe-Hansen =

Danish educator and women's activist

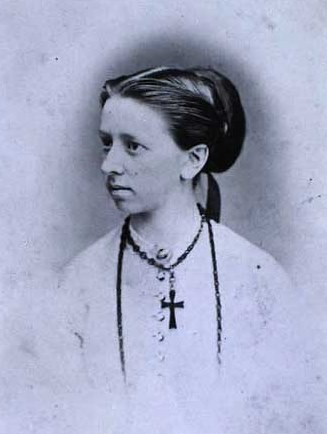
- Before c.1890
- Born: Ida Mariette Helene Hansen; 19 February 1849; Odense, Denmark
- Died: 23 February 1922 (aged 73); Copenhagen, Denmark
- Resting place: Frederiksberg Ældre Kirkegård
- Awards: Danish Medal of Merit (1914); Litteris et Artibus (1915)

Ida Mariette Helene Falbe-Hansen born Hansen (19 February 1849 – 23 September 1922) was a Danish educator, philologist and women's activist. A pioneer in the teaching of Swedish, she published textbooks and promoted Swedish literature in Denmark. She was also active on the board of the Danish Women's Society and chaired the Danish Women's Council.

== Biography ==
Born in Odense on 19 February 1849, Ida Mariette Helene Falbe-Hansen was the daughter of Johan Jørgen Hansen (1802–76) and Mariette Caroline Emilie Ernestine Basse (1817–83). In 1877, she attended N. Zahle's School in Copenhagen where, after completing a teacher training course, she was employed by the school as a teacher (1878–84). After a brief spell teaching at Vældegaard Kvindeskole in Gentofte, she travelled to London where she studied at the British Museum. In 1889 she returned to Zahle's school where she taught Swedish and Danish until 1899. In 1890, she became the first woman to graduate in Nordic philology from Copenhagen University.

As a result of her effective teaching skills, she became an inspector for the state school teachers' examination (1892–1911) and, from 1910 to 1919, chair of Den Danske Pigeskole (Danish School for Girls). During this period, she also served as a member of the Board of Applied Sciences Examinations as well as a ministerial representative.

Falbe-Hansen was a pioneering teacher of Swedish, publishing excellent textbooks and promoting Swedish literature in Denmark. In collaboration with Elisabeth Grundtvig, she translated the works of the Swedish Nobel laureate Selma Lagerlöf. She was also active in women's rights, becoming a board member of the Danish Women's Society (1883–86) and of the Women's Reading Association (1889–96). In 1899, she became chair of the Danish Women's National Council. As a literary historian, she published several works including Den ny Eventyrbog (1873) and Gamle danske Folkeviser (Old Danish Folksongs, 1917). In 1914, she was awarded the Danish Medal of Merit and, in 1915, the Swedish Litteris et Artibus.

Ida Falbe-Hansen died on 23 September 1922 in the Frederiksberg district of Copenhagen. She is buried in Frederiksberg Ældre Kirkegård.
