= Luplau =

Luplau is a surname. Notable people with the surname include:

- Line Luplau (1823–1891), Danish feminist and suffragist
- Marie Luplau (1848–1925), Danish artist and educator, daughter of Line
