= Budtz =

Budtz is a Danish surname and male given name. Notable people with this name include:

- Budtz Müller (1837–1884), Danish photographer
- Hanne Budtz (1915–2004), Danish politician and lawyer
- Hans Egede Budtz (1889–1968), Danish stage and film actor
- Jan Budtz (born 1979), Danish football player
- Ole Budtz (born 1979), Danish football player
