= Johanne Meyer =

Danish suffragist, pacifist and journal editor

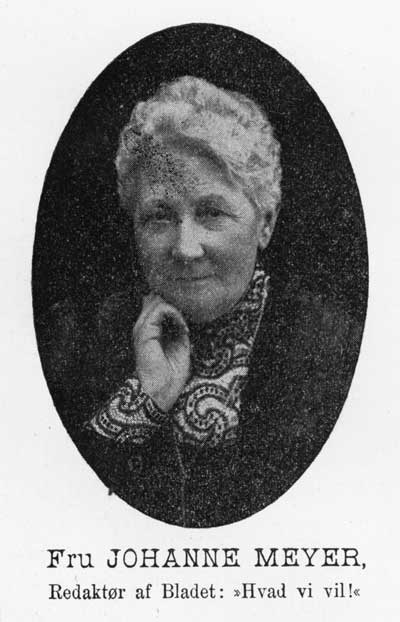
Johanne Meyer

Johanne Marie Abrahammine Meyer née Petersen (1838–1915) was a Danish suffragist, pacifist and journal editor. A pioneering member of various women's societies, from 1889 she served on the board of the pacifist organization Dansk Fredsforening and became the influential president of the progressive suffragist organization Kvindelig Fremskridtsforening (KF). From 1888, Meyer was editor of KF's journal Hvad vi vil (What We Want), to which she contributed many articles.

== Biography ==
Born on 1 July 1838 in Aalborg, Johanne Marie Abrahammine Petersen was the daughter of the customs officer Lauritz Petersen (1802–1856) and Sophie Frederikke Lundberg (1799–c.1863). In 1858, she married Emil Lauritz Meyer (1833–1917), a Jewish merchant who converted to Christianity. After living in Nyborg until 1867, the couple moved to Copenhagen where her husband became a licensed retailer and she ran a small private school.

In 1885, she began writing articles on English pacifism for the political journal Social-Demokraten. As a result of the women's strike at Ruben's textile factory in 1886, she became a committed socialist, supporting equal rights for women and universal suffrage. In July 1888 at the Nordic Women's Meeting (Nordiske Kvindesagsmøde) held in Copenhagen, she campaigned energetically for women's voting rights. It had been convened by the Kvindelig Fremskridtsforening (KF, Women's Progressive Society) where she was president from 1889, defining the organization's objectives. She also edited the women's movement's journal Hvad vi vil, becoming its most productive contributor.

In 1889, together with Louise Nørlund and Line Luplau, she founded Kvindevalgretsforeningen (KVF) which was set on achieving voting rights for women. From the early 1890s, she became increasingly involved in pacifism, becoming the vice-president of the Danish peace society, Fredsforeningen. She continued to push for women's voting rights both in the KVF and by giving a considerable number of lectures. In 1911, she attended the Universal Race Congress as the delegate of the Peace Society of Copenhagen. In later life she became increasingly religious, founding the Theosophical Society of Denmark.

Johanne Meyer died in the Copenhagen district of Frederiksberg on 4 February 1915.

== See also ==
- List of peace activists
