= Louise Nørlund =

Danish feminist and pacifist

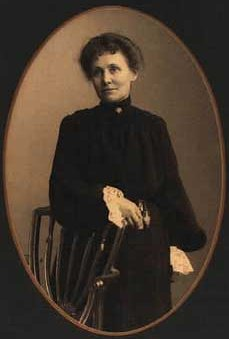
- Louise Nørlund by Julie Laurberg
- Born: 1854; Beder, Denmark
- Died: 1919 (aged 64–65); Copenhagen, Denmark
- Spouse: Niels Nørlund (m. 1881–1892) ending in divorce

Marie Sørine Louise Nørlund (1854–1919) was a Danish feminist and pacifist. She was the founder and chairman of the Danske Kvindeforeningers Valgretsforbund or DKV (the Danish Women's Society's Suffrage Union) in 1898–1907 and 1908–1909.

== Life ==
She was the daughter of the farmer and parliamentarian Mikkel Hasle Christiansen (1816–83) and Ane Jacobsdatter (1820–88). She married journalist and publisher Niels Jensen Nørlund (1854–1894) in 1881, but the couple divorced in 1892, and after the death of her former spouse, she was left in full responsibility for their only child, Agnes.

Louise Nørlund was early interested in politics, as her parents’ home was a center for radical democrats. She took her teacher's exam from Beyer, Bohrs og Femmers Kursus and was employed as a teacher at the Larslejstrædes Skole in 1878–1910. In her profession, she participated in the foundation of the Kbh.s Kommunelærerindeforening (The Copenhagen Association of Female Teachers) in 1891. She was also engaged in the peace movement: she was a member of the Dansk Fredsforening (Danish Peace Movement), where she was active as speaker and writer and a delegate to the International women's peace congress in the Hague in 1915, where the Women’s International League for Peace and Freedom was founded.

Nørlund is, however, most known for her work as a feminist. Initially, she was a member of the Dansk Kvindesamfund or DK (The Danish Women's Association), which was the first women's association in Denmark. She was a very active speaker, and instrumental in its breakthrough in the provinces. She was, however, impatient of DK:s hesitance to support the question of women suffrage, and in 1885, she left the DK, alongside among others Elisabet Ouchterlony and Matilde Bajer, to found the Kvindelig Fremskridtsforening (Female Progress Union). In 1889, she also supported Line Luplau in the foundation of the national Kvindevalgretsforeningen (The Women Suffrage Union). She was the chairman of Kvindevalgretsforeningen 1891–1894. In 1898, the Kvindevalgretsforeningen was dissolved, and she founded Danske Kvindeforeningers Valgretsudvalg, from 1904 called Danske Kvindeforeningers Valgretsforbund or DKV (The United Danish Suffrage Movements For Women). It was a union of many smaller Suffrage movements in Denmark united under her leadership. In 1904, when DKV was made of 22 different suffrage movements, she made it a part of the international suffrage movement under International Woman Suffrage Alliance (IWSA). She represented Denmark at the international suffrage conferences at Berlin in 1904, Amsterdam in 1908 and Budapest in 1913. She retired in 1909 and was replaced by Eline Hansen.

Nørlund was a member of the liberal party and the first of her sex in its board in 1890–1904, but later left the party and was a candidate for the Social Democrats in the municipal elections in Copenhagen in 1909, but was forced the leave her candidacy for health reasons.

== See also ==
- List of peace activists
