= Elisa Petersen =

Danish politician and women's rights activist

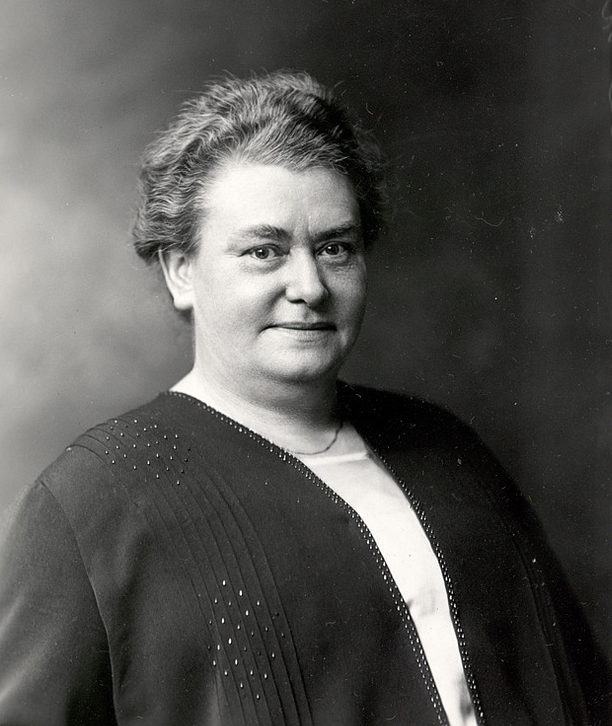
Elisa Petersen

Elisabeth Amalie Petersen born Parelius, usually known as Elisa Petersen, (1876–1932) was a Danish politician and women's rights activist. She was involved in the women's movement from 1907 and served on the municipal council of Næstved from 1909. As a member of the Danish Women's Society, she contributed in particular to children's welfare, later serving as president of the organisation from 1924 to 1931. Representing the Liberal Party, from 1928 until her death in 1932 she served as a member in the Landsting.

== Biography ==
Born on 3 January 1876 in Aarhus, Elisabeth Amalie Petersen was the daughter of the station master Hans Ludvig Schjellerup Parelius (1853–1930) and Amalie Marie Bendixen (1843–1895). She was admitted to the Polytechnical Institute in 1899 but broke off her studies shortly afterwards, becoming a teacher at Fru Skjold's girls' school in Næstved. In April 1902, she married the lawyer Jacob Oluf Severin Petersen who, like herself, was also interested in politics.

When women were first permitted to stand for municipal elections, in 1909 she was elected to Næstved Town Council for the Liberal Party, serving until 1921. During the First World War, she successfully oversaw emergency measures, including the establishment of public kitchens. Following the extension of women's voting rights to the Rigsdag in 1915, she became a member both of the board for the Næstved district and of the central board for Zealand and Bornholm.

After becoming a founding member of the Næstved branch of the Danish Women's Society in 1907, she was elected to the organisation's central management board in 1909 and became district president for Zealand in 1916. She did much to support arrangements for children, succeeding in having contributions for single mothers extended to widows with children in 1910. As head of the children's department of the Women's Society, she called for the establishment of more nurseries and care centres for children.

Petersen's interest in children led to her becoming the first woman in Denmark to be appointed to a regional school board, namely that of Tybjerg Herred, where she served from 1921 to 1929. In connection with the national elections in 1918, she encouraged women not only to vote but to stand as candidates. The results were however disappointing with only four women being elected to the Folketing and five to the Landsting. Unlike her colleague Gyrithe Lemche, she did not support the establishment of parties consisting only of women but called for women to stand side by side with men in the existing parties. In 1924, she was elected president of the Danish Women's Society, a position she maintained until 1931. She displayed good qualities of leadership, gaining the respect of the membership in her efforts to achieve long-term objectives.

On her husband's death in 1928, she moved to Copenhagen where she served in the Landsting and in the Rigsdag. She fought for more gender equity and called for implementation of the 1919 Act on Equal Pay for Women and Men in Public Serves and the 1921 Act on Equal Access to Public Posts and Employment. She also strove to obtain better conditions for housekeeping mothers, calling for the establishment of university courses in housekeeping.

Despite suffering from cancer, she held her post at the Landsting until her death. She died in Copenhagen on 7 September 1932 and was buried in Næstved.
