= Marie Rovsing =

Pioneering Danish women's rights activist

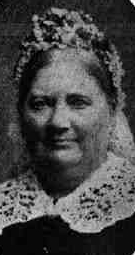
- Born: Marie Nicolina Theodora Schack; 11 November 1814
- Died: 1888 (aged 73–74)
- Occupation: Activist

Marie Nicolina Theodora Rovsing née Schack (1814–1888) was a pioneering Danish women's rights activist. From 1871 to 1888 she was a board member of the Danish Women's Society, serving as president from 1883 to 1887. Interested in allowing women to practise crafts and manual work traditionally reserved for men, on her death she left a legacy which among other things allowed two women to be the first in Denmark to qualify as carpenters.

== Biography ==
Born on 11 November 1814 in Sengeløse to the west of Copenhagen, Marie Nicolina Theodora Schack was the daughter of Nicolai Clausen Schack (1781–1844), a provost, and Tagea Dorothea Erasmi (1785–1841). She was educated together with her sister Hansine at Miss Zeuthen's girls' boarding school. In 1845, she married the school director Kristen Rovsing (1812–1889) although she continued to promote her maiden name including født Schack (née Schack) when she referred to herself.

Despite the disapproval of her husband, she became a board member of the Danish Women's Society (1871–1888), serving as president from 1883 to 1887. She was a firm advocate of a women's business and vocational school and also fought for allowing women to be trained in occupations that had traditionally been reserved for men. In 1887, this led to her establishing a crafts committee which called for the establishment of a bookbinding school for women. She also provided support for the Kvindelig Læseforening (Women Readers' Association) and, by extension, to pioneering women academics, including the medical doctors Nielsine Nielsen and Marie Gleerup, and the historian Anna Hude, the first Danish woman to earn a Dr phil.

Although the bookbinding school was never founded, on her death in 1888, Rovsing left a legacy for supporting women who wished to work as craftsmen. Known as Fru Marie Rovsing, født Schacks Mindelegat for Kvinders haandværksmæssige Uddannelse (Mrs Marie Rovsing née Schack's Legacy for Women's Training as Craftsmen), it was administered by the Women's Society. In particular, it provided support for the training of Cathrine Horsbøll and Sophy Christensen as carpenters.

Rovsing died in Copenhagen on 25 September 1888 and was buried in Garnisons Cemetery. She was survived by her sisters Hansine Andræ and Tagea Brandt, both of whom were also women's rights activists.
