= Julie Arenholt =

Danish engineer and women's rights activist

Julie Johanne Arenholt
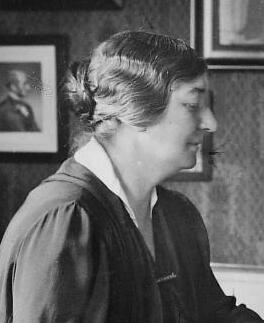
- Born: Julie Johanne Rosengreen; 10 December 1873; Copenhagen
- Died: 21 July 1952 (aged 78); Copenhagen
- Burial place: Bispebjerg Cemetery

Julie Johanne Arenholt née Rosengreen (10 December 1873 – 21 July 1952) was a Danish civil engineer, women's rights activist and politician. In 1910, she became the first woman in Denmark to work as a factory engineer, inspecting the premises of bakeries in Copenhagen until she retired in 1939. She was an active member of the Danish Women's Society, serving as president from 1918 to 1921. She was also prominent at the international level, speaking at conferences and serving on the central committee of the International Alliance of Women (1923–1929).

== Biography ==
Born on 10 December 1873 in the Frederiksberg district of Copenhagen, Julie Johanne Rosengreen was the daughter of Harald Christian Rosengreen (1836–1907), a civil servant, and Rasmine Rasmussen (1840–1914). On receiving the necessary qualification, she worked as a schoolteacher before entering the Polytechnic Teaching Institute in 1896, qualifying as Denmark's first female factory engineer in 1901. In 1903, she married the medical doctor and Olympic tennis player Jørgen Arenholt (1876–1953).

She worked first at the Teaching Institute, then at Detlefsen and Meyer's laboratory. In 1910, she succeeded in obtaining the newly created post of factory inspector at the Directorate for Labour and Manufacturing Control (Direktoratet for Arbejds- og Fabriktilsynet), where she was responsible for checking out bakeries and pastry shops in the Copenhagen area.

On the political front, her lifelong interest in economic and social conditions began in 1907 when she was one of the founders of the women's suffrage association Landsforbundet for Kvinders Valgret, editing their journal Kvindevalgret (Women's Right to Vote) from 1908 to 1912. In 1909 she was elected to the Copenhagen City Council for the Social Liberal Party. She proved to be a talented speaker, winning more votes than normal when she gained more votes than normal for the Social Liberal Party in Gentofte in 1918 when women were first permitted to stand for the Folketing.

In 1915, she joined the Danish Women's Society, serving as president from 1918 to 1921. She gained a reputation both in Denmark and abroad for her strong leadership skills. She played an active part at the congresses of the International Women's Movement, serving on the central committee of the International Alliance of Women from 1923 to 1929. In particular, she fought for women's participation in business.

Julie Arenholt died in Copenhagen on 21 July 1952 and was buried in Bispebjerg Cemetery.
