= Johanne Münter =

Danish writer and women's rights activist

Johanne Elisabeth Münter née Johnson (1844–1921) was a Danish writer and women's rights activist.

After travelling to Japan with her husband in 1895, Münter authored several books on Japanese women and her own fascination with the country. In the 1890s, she became involved in the women's movement, speaking about culture and religion at the Kvindelig Læseforening (Women's Reading Society). She also joined the Danske Kvinders Forsvarsforening (Danish Women's Defence Association) and the women's department of the Red Cross.

In 1904, she participated in the founding conference of the International Woman Suffrage Alliance (IWSA) in Berlin. In 1906, she founded and headed the women's suffrage organization Kvindevalgretsklubben which was a member of the Danske Kvindeforeningers Valgretsforbund (Danish Women's Society Suffrage Union). Münter served as a delegate at the IWSA conferences in Amsterdam (1908) and London (1909).

== Biography ==
Born on 13 May 1844 in Rønne, Bornholm, Münter was the daughter of the ship owner Peter Johnson (1786–1850) and Maren Kirstine Sonne (1801–1882). In 1865, she married the naval officer Alexander Herman Jacob Balthasa Münter (1837–1932).

From 1873, Münter spent 10 years in Malmö, Sweden, where her husband was director of a shipyard as well as Danish consul. In 1883, she moved to Copenhagen while her husband was working in the Far East as a military adviser in China and Japan. Johanne Münter increasingly experienced marital difficulties with her husband, especially when she visited him in Japan in 1895. The trip had nevertheless inspired her to lecture on her travels and publish books recounting her experiences. In particular, her Minder fra Japan described the status of Japanese women and her own fascination with the exotic land.

Münter became interested in the women's movement after the 1895 Copenhagen Women's Exhibition and the influence of suffrage campaigners in the late 1890s. She also studied and wrote about Buddhism and Shintoism which she did see as incompatible with Christianity. In 1901, she published Buddhismens Historie (The History of Buddhism) and in 1914 Den esoteriske Buddhisme (Esoteric Buddhism).

In regard to the women's movement, Münter became a member of the Danske Kvinders Forsvarsforening (Danish Women's Defence Association) and joined the women's section of the Red Cross. In 1904, she attended the founding conference of the International Woman Suffrage Alliance (IWSA) in Berlin and was also a delegate at the IWSA conferences in Amsterdam (1908) and London (1909). In 1906, she founded and headed the women's suffrage organization Kvindevalgretsklubben (KVK) which became known as "Fru Münters Club". Although it had only about a hundred members, many of them were highly influential women in regard to suffrage and rights. It was associated with Danske Kvindeforeningers Valgretsforbund where Münter was international secretary from 1904 until 1909, when Thora Daugaard took the position. She edited the KVK members' journal Kvindestemmerets-Bladet (1907–1913). She also contributed articles to Berlingske Tidende, Damernes Blad, Kvindernes Blad and Husmoderens Blad.

Münter died in Hellebæk on 27 July 1921. She was buried in Copenhagen's Vestre Cemetery.
