= Danske Kvindeforeningers Valgsretsudvalg =

Danish women's organization

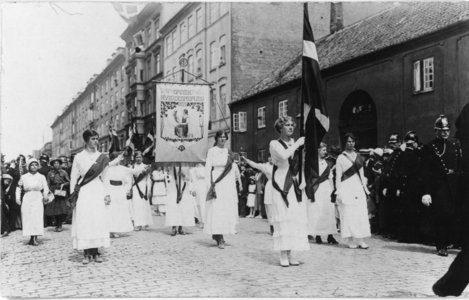
Danish suffragist procession 1915

The Danske Kvindeforeningers Valgsretsudvalg (Danish Women's Society's Suffrage Committee) was established in 1898 by Louise Nørlund, with support from Line Luplau, in order to work towards obtaining the vote for women. In 1904, the organization's name was changed to Danske Kvindeforeningers Valgretsforbund (DKV) or the Danish Women's Society's Suffrage Union.

The DKV consisted of an alliance of women's organizations targeting votes for women in both municipal and national elections. Under Nørlund's leadership, the number of associations grew from eight in 1898 to 22 in 1904. That year the organization joined the newly established International Women Suffrage Alliance (IWSA) making Denmark one of its first 10 members. Johanne Münter was the first international secretary until 1909 when Thora Daugaard took over until 1915 when Danish women won the right to vote. Nørlund participated in the 1904 IWSA Congress in Berlin and went on to organize the 1906 congress in Copenhagen.

Vibeke Salicath chaired the DKV for a short period in 1907 but Nørlund returned in 1908, after which Eline Hansen was chair.

In 1906, Johanne Münter founded and headed the women's suffrage organization Kvindevalgretsklubben (KVK). Associated with the DVK, it became known as "Fru Münters Club". Although it had only about a hundred members, many of them were highly influential women in regard to suffrage and rights. She edited the KVK members' journal Kvindestemmerets-Bladet (1907–1913). KVK was dissolved in about 1913.

== See also ==
- Landsforbundet for Kvinders Valgret (National Association for Women's Suffrage)
- Timeline of women's suffrage
