= Inga Fischer-Hjalmars =

Swedish physicist, chemist, and humanist

- Born: Inga Fischer; January 16, 1918; Stockholm, Stockholm County, Sweden
- Died: September 17, 2008 (aged 90); Lidingö, Stockholm County, Sweden
- Education: Stockholm University (PhD, 1952)
- Known for: Coulson–Fischer theory
- Spouse: Stig Hjalmars
- Scientific career
- Fields: Quantum chemistry
- Workplaces: Stockholm University
- Thesis: Studies of the Hydrogen Bond and the Ortho-Effect (1952)

Inga Fischer-Hjalmars (née Fischer; 16 January 1918– 17 September 2008) was a Swedish physicist, chemist, pharmacist, humanist, and a pioneer in quantum chemistry. She was one of the pioneers in the application of quantum mechanics to solve problems in theoretical chemistry. Coulson–Fischer theory is named after her. She was also the first female professor in theoretical physics in Sweden.

During her bachelor, she contributed to the discovery of lidocaine, a local anesthetic.

Fischer-Hjalmars also served as chair of the International Council of Scientific Unions' Standing Committee on the Free Circulation of Scientists.

== Biography ==
Inga Fisher was born in Stockholm in 1918. Fischer father was railway engineer Otto Fischer.

She received her bachelor's degree in 1939 (pharmacy), a master's in 1944 (physics, chemistry and mathematics). She received her ”licentiat” in mechanics in 1949, and another in chemistry, in 1950. During her studies she worked as an assistant of various scientists including Nils Löfgren, Nobel Prize in Chemistry Hans von Euler-Chelpin, Oskar Klein and Charles Coulson.

In 1949, she began work on her doctorate, which she gained in 1952 at Stockholm University, where she became an associate professor of mechanical and mathematical physics. Fischer-Hjalmars married mechanical engineering professor Stig Hjalmars, who was also one of this doctoral thesis referees, and proposed to her at the end of her defense.

During the period of 1959 to 1963, she also ran a service laboratory in mathematical physics at the Royal Institute of Technology. In 1963, at Stockholm University, Fischer-Hjalmars became Sweden's first female professor of theoretical physics, where she was known as a popular lecturer. She succeeded Oskar Klein in the post and maintained Professorship till 1982. She was affiliated with the International Academy of Quantum Molecular Science (member), Royal Swedish Academy of Sciences (member), Royal Danish Academy of Sciences and Letters (member), World Academy of Art and Sciences (Fellow), and the International Council of Scientific Unions' Standing Committee on the Free Circulation of Scientists (chair).

She was also a nominator of the Nobel Prize in Physics.

She died in 2008 in Lidingö, Sweden.

== Research ==
=== Lidocaine ===
After earning her bachelor in pharmacy, and during her masters, she worked in the group of Nils Löfgren and Bengt Lundqvist. The group was the first to develop lidocaine, which later became a commercial local anesthetic. Fisher was not in the patent, but according to Gunnar Widmark, a coworker, she was the first to methodically synthesize the molecule and the first to synthesize large-scale batches. However, she was not included to the patent. Lidocaine became successful commercially in 1948.

=== Coulson collaboration ===
During 1948−1949, she worked with Charles Coulson at King's College London. They made rigorous investigations of the hydrogen molecule. There were conflicting theoretical predictions between the valence bond theory and the molecular orbital theory. Due to the limitations of both models at the time, they ended up developing what is now known as Coulson–Fischer theory. Part of this work made it into her thesis.

=== Later work ===
In 1956 she studied the electronic structure and configuration interaction of ozone. She calculated all integrals and molecular orbitals using a desk calculator. To tackle larger molecules and biomolecules, Fischer-Hjalmars developed various approximate methods based on parametrization and adaptation to empirical data in the 1960s.

She also studied the justification of the zero differential overlap approximation and the Pariser−Parr−Pople (PPP) method between 1965 and 1966. She demonstrated that semiempirical approximations within the molecular orbital method can be classified by expanding the matrix elements in terms of the overlap integral (S_{ij}) between nearest-neighbor atoms in a molecule. Her analysis revealed that the Hückel method is accurate to first order in S_{ij}, whereas the PPP method is accurate to second order in S_{ij}. This finding contributed to the reparameterization of the PPP method.

During the 1970s and 1980s, numerous comprehensive studies were conducted on the bonding, electronic structure, and spectra of biologically important metal complexes. For this work, Inga Fischer-Hjalmars received the International Society of Quantum Biology Award in 1985.

Fischer-Hjalmars and her group developed the semiempirical Peel method, a modified PPP method in 1990.

== Activism ==
Fischer-Hjalmars became involved in human rights activism. In the 1970s, she supported the Soviet refuseniks, especially Jewish and oppositional scientists persecuted by the Soviet Union. Fischer-Hjalmars actively supported these scientists by attending secret meetings and giving lectures. She also worked through international scientific organizations, wrote public letters exposing Soviet abuses, and pressured Soviet authorities directly. At one conference in Canada, she publicly confronted Soviet Academy representatives by reading the names of missing scientists, some of whom were never seen again.

For her engagement, she was awarded the 1990 Heinz R. Pagels Award by the New York Academy of Sciences.

== Awards and honors ==
For her work in biology she was awarded the International Society of Quantum Biology Award in 1985.

For her human right advocacy, she received the Heinz R. Pagels Human Rights of Scientists Award, New York Academy of Sciences in 1990.

In 2009, the Swedish Chemical Society established the Inga Fischer-Hjalmars Award in her honor. It is awarded to the best theses in theoretical chemistry.

== Bibliography ==
- Acton, Q. Ashton (1 May 2013). Issues in Education by Subject, Profession, and Vocation: 2013 Edition. Scholarly Editions. ISBN 978-1-4901-0922-0.
