= Coulson–Fischer theory =

Quantum mechanical description of electronic structure

In theoretical chemistry and molecular physics, Coulson–Fischer theory provides a quantum mechanical description of the electronic structure of molecules. The 1949 seminal work of Charles Coulson and Inga Fischer established a theory of molecular electronic structure which combines the strengths of the two rival theories which emerged soon after the advent of quantum chemistry - valence bond theory and molecular orbital theory, whilst avoiding many of their weaknesses. For example, unlike the widely used Hartree–Fock molecular orbital method, Coulson–Fischer theory provides a qualitatively correct description of molecular dissociative processes. The Coulson–Fischer wave function has been said to provide a third way in quantum chemistry. Modern valence bond theory is often seen as an extension of the Coulson–Fischer method.

== Theory ==
Coulson–Fischer theory is an extension of modern valence bond theory (VBT) that uses localized atomic orbitals as the basis for VBT structures. In Coulson–Fischer Theory, orbitals are delocalized towards nearby atoms. This description is applied to molecular hydrogen (H_{2})as follows:

$$\phi_1 = a + \lambda b$$

$$\phi_2 = b + \lambda a$$

where a and b are atomic 1s orbitals, that are used as the basis functions for VBT, and λ is a delocalization parameter from 0 to 1. The valence bond (VB) structures then use $\phi_1$ and $\phi_2$ as the basis functions to describe the total electronic wavefunction as

$$\Phi_{\rm CF} = \left\vert \phi_1\overline{\phi_2} \right\vert - \left\vert \overline{\phi_1}\phi_2 \right\vert$$

in obvious analogy to the Heitler-London wavefunction. However, an expansion of the Coulson–Fischer (CF) description of the wavefunction in terms of a and b gives:

$$\Phi_{\rm CF} = (1 + \lambda^2)(\left\vert a\overline{b} \right\vert - \left\vert \overline{a}b \right\vert) + (2\lambda)(\left\vert a\overline{a} \right\vert + \left\vert b\overline{b} \right\vert)$$

A full VBT description of H_{2} that includes both ionic and covalent contributions is

$$\Phi_{\rm VBT} = \epsilon(\left\vert a\overline{b} \right\vert - \left\vert \overline{a}b \right\vert) + \mu(\left\vert a\overline{a} \right\vert + \left\vert b\overline{b} \right\vert)$$

where ε and μ are constants between 0 and 1.

As a result, the CF description gives the same description as a full valence bond description, but with just one VB structure.
