= Andrea Hedegaard =

Danish women's rights activist

Andrea Hedegaard (1887 - 1967) was a Danish women's rights activist.

She was the President of the Dansk Kvindesamfund in 1941–1943.

She was a member of the Radikale Venstre. She was a member of the Party Board, and ran unsuccessfully for the Folketinget several times between 1935 and 1953.
