= Erna Sørensen =

Danish women's rights activist and politician

Erna Bertha Cecilie Sørensen, née Christensen, (1896–1980) was a Danish lawyer, women's rights activist and politician. A member of the Conservative People's Party, she was elected to the Folketing in 1945 and again in 1947. She was president of the Danish Women's Society (1948–1951) and chaired the Danish Women's Conservative Association (1951–1966). Sørensen was particularly interested in achieving equal rights for women in politics and education.

== Biography ==
Born on 19 September 1896 in the Copenhagen district of Frederiksberg, Erna Bertha Cecilie Christensen was the daughter of Erik Peter Christensen (1855–1930) and Anna Christine Andreasen (1862–1927). In 1924, she married the auditor Marius Sørensen (1886–1965) with whom she had two children, Birthe Margrethe (1925) and Anna-Louise (1927).

Sørensen graduated as a lawyer in 1921 and received authorization to practice in 1924. As a lawyer, she established her own practise in 1933 and in 1952 was assigned to the high court. On the political front, she joined the Copenhagen branch of Conservative Election Association in 1941. In 1945, together with two other women, Oda Christensen and Gudrun Hasselriis, she was elected to the Folketing, representing the Conservative People's Party. She was re-elected in 1947, becoming the only woman to represent the party until 1950. As a result, it was she who dealt with matters concerning families and women although she was also active in many other areas.

From 1948 to 1951, as president of the Danish Women's Society, she revived interest in the organization which had lost members during the Second World War, doing all she could to improve conditions for women.

Over the next 20 years, she was also played a prominent role in a number of other organizations dealing with women's employment, Nordic representation, apprenticeship and kindergartens. Her achievements both in politics and as a mother and housewife were widely appreciated. In 1955, she was honoured with the Order of the Dannebrog.

Erna Sørensen died in Hørsholm on 18 January 1980.
