= Anna Margarete Stegmann =

Anna Margarete Stegmann (12 July 1871 – 1 July 1936) was a Swiss-German neurologist, psychoanalyst and politician. She was a Social Democratic Party member of the Reichstag of the Weimar Republic.

The daughter of a farmer, she was born Anna Margarete Meyer in Zürich, Switzerland. Both her parents had died by the time that she was sixteen. She worked for the Swiss postal service, completed her secondary education and went on to study medicine. Stegmann earned her doctorate in 1910 in Zurich. She joined the Social Democratic Party in 1918. After completing her internship, she received her license to practise medicine in 1920 and set up practice in Dresden.

During the 1920s, she was a member of the International Psychoanalytical Association, the Schopenhauer Society and the Women's International League for Peace and Freedom. When the Nazi Party gained power in Germany, she left for Switzerland.

From 1920 to 1924, she was an unpaid member of the city council of Dresden. She served as a member of the Reichstag from May 1924 to September 1930. In 1924, she argued for the right of women to abortion; in the spirit of those times, eugenic reasons were used to justify abortion in certain cases.

She married Arnold Stegmann in 1911 but he died in 1914.

She died in Arlesheim at the age of 64.

== Selected works ==
- Beitrag zur Psychologie des Kindsmords thesis 1910
- Ein Fall von Namenvergessen Zentralblatt für Psychoanalyse und Psychotherapie 2 (1912)
- Ein Vexiertraum Internationale Zeitschrift für Psychoanalyse 1, pages 486–489 (1913)
- Darstellung epileptischer Anfälle im Traum Internationale Zeitschrift für Psychoanalyse (1913)
- Identifizierung mit dem Vater Zentralblatt für Psychoanalyse und Psychotherapie 1, (1913)
- Die Psychogenese organischer Krankheiten und das Weltbild Imago 12, pages 196-202 (1926)
- Frauenblindheit der Männer – eine alte Krankheit Die Genossin 6, (1929)
