= Ingrid Larsen (activist) =

Danish politician

Ingrid Larsen (1883 - 1965) was a Danish politician (Konservative Folkeparti) and women's rights activist.

She was born to the mayor Carl Christian Rasmussen (1842-1912) and Mariane Gether (1844-1936), and married the judge Anders Peter Larsen in 1907.

She was the President of the Dansk Kvindesamfund in 1943–1947.

She was a Substitute in the Landstinget in 1936–1951.
