= Eva Hemmer Hansen =

Danish journalist

Eva Tjuba Hemmer Hansen (1913–1983) was a Danish journalist, novelist, translator and feminist. While working for the newspaper Demokraten, in 1944, she published Helene, the first in a series of novels, several of which proved popular. As a social democrat, she played particular attention to women's issues, chairing the party's women's committee for the Aarhus City Council. She later left the party in order to support the women's cause. In 1968, she was appointed chair of the Danish Women's Society, compiling a history of the organization in connection with its 100th anniversary in 1970. A highly active translator, in 1975 she published a new Danish edition of the collected works of Charles Dickens.

== Early life, family and education ==
Born in Aalborg on 2 January 1913, Eva Tjuba Hemmer Hansen was the daughter of Jacob Peter Hemmer Hansen, an editor, and his wife Elna Cecilie Louise née Højby Nielsen. In December 1939, she married the office manager Kjeld Elsøe Pihl (1913–1986) with whom she had two children, Luise (1940) and Niels (1943). The marriage was dissolved in 1964. In May 1965, she married the Norwegian writer and publisher Alf Grostøl (1912–1973).

After matriculating from Marselisborg Gymnasium in Aarhus in 1931, she studied Danish and English at Aarhus University from 1933 where she was active in the student union. After a year at Askov Højskole, she studied at Ruskin College in Oxford. She passed a translation examination in English in 1943 which gave her a solid basis for her later work.

== Career ==
In the 1940s, it was not easy to make a living as an author. After taking a course in journalism, she was engaged as a journalist at the Aarhus daily newspaper Demokraten where she remained until 1958. In parallel, she embarked on a successful writing careen publishing a series of novels from 1944 when she published Helene. The most successful were En lille tøg og hendes mor (A Little Lass and Her Mother, 1952), and Skandale i Troja (1954) which was translated into several languages, including the English Scandal in Troy (1956).

Hemmer Hansen also lectured, taught evening classes and was politically active as a social democrat, taking a special interest in women's issues. In 1948, she chaired the women's committee for the Aarhus City Council and in the late 1950s served as an advisor to the Danish government delegation at the International Labour Organization conferences in Geneva. She is remembered in particular for chairing the Danish Women's Society (1968–1971). In connection with its 100th anniversary in 1971, she published Blåstrømper, rødstrømper, uldstrømper (Red Stockings, Blue Stockings, Wollen Stockings), describing the organization's history.

Eva Hemmer Hansen died in Aarhus on 26 March 1983. She is buried in the city's Vestre Cemetery.
