= Gyrithe Lemche =

Danish writer and women's rights activist

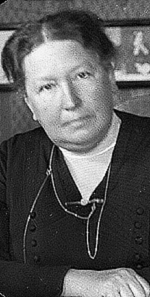
- Born: Ellen Gyrithe Lemche; 17 April 1866; Copenhagen, Denmark
- Died: 3 February 1945 (aged 78)
- Occupations: Writer; Activist; Historian

Ellen Gyrithe Lemche née Frisch (1866–1945) was a Danish writer, women's rights campaigner and local historian. She is remembered in particular for the important part she played in the activities of the Danish Women's Society (Dansk Kvindesamfund), especially around 1915 when the Danish Constitution was amended to include women's suffrage. She was a co-founder of Lyngby-Tårbæk Local Historic Society (Historisk-Topografisk Selskab for Lyngby-Tårbæk) in 1927.

== Early life and family ==
Born in Copenhagen on 17 April 1866, Ellen Gyrithe Frisch was the daughter of the headmaster Hartvig Frisch (1833–90) and Elisabeth Alexandra Mourier (1835–92). On 19 July 1893, she married the physician Johan Henrich Lemche (1863–1962).

Ellen Gyrithe spent her early years in Copenhagen's Store Kongensgade before moving with her family to Lyngby where her maternal grandparents lived. Together with her three siblings, she was first educated at home, then attended N. Zahle's School. On matriculating, she began to study German at the University of Copenhagen but soon gave up, discouraged by the males dominated environment she experienced. Instead she became a teacher at her father's school until her marriage in 1893. Despite giving birth to three children, one of whom died when two years old, she devoted herself to writing, leaving her children to the care of her husband and the household staff.

== Career as a writer ==
Her first book, the semi-biographical novel Soedtmanns Jomfruer, portrays the history of the inhabitants of Lyngby, including her relatives, from medieval times to the present. Her interest in local history later led to her becoming a co-founder of the Lyngby-Tårbæk History Society (Historisk-Topografisk Selskab for Lyngby-Tårbæk) in 1927. In 1899, she published Folkets Synder which brought out the lack of attention given to women's sexuality. Her most important work was however the family novel Edwardsgave which was published in five volumes from 1900 to 1912, set principally in the 18th century. She also published De Fyrstenberg Bønder (1905), depicting the lives of farmers in Gentofte in the 18th and 19th centuries.

== Involvement as a women's rights activist ==
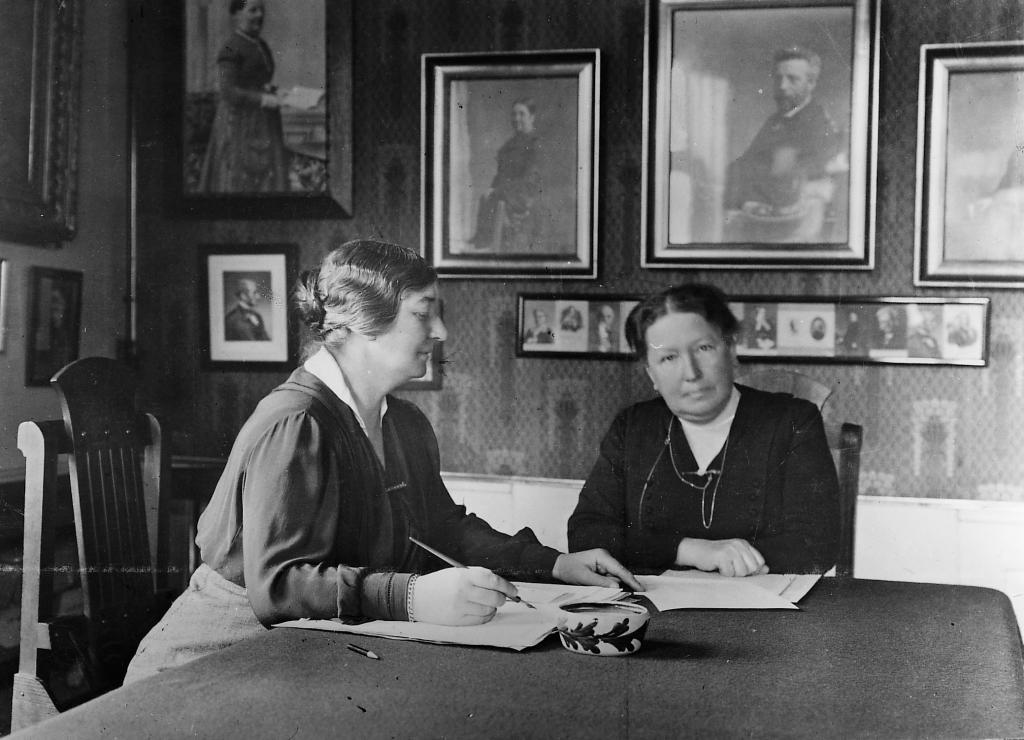
Gyrithe Lemche and Julie Arentholt in 1922

In 1906, her elder sister Vibeke Salicath who was a board member of the Danish Women's Society, invited her to the society's national convention. In 1910, Lemche was appointed to the board and under Astrid Stampe Feddersen's presidency from 1913 to 1918 became the organization's most active ideologist and effective leader. She is remembered in particular for her speech in 1912 calling for reforms to the constitution in order to allow women to vote. The amendment was adopted in 1915. Lemche also took on the task of editing the society's journal Kvinden og Samfundet (Woman and Society) from 1913 to 1919. Although she retired from the presidency of the Women's Society in 1918, to be replaced by Julie Arenholt, she remained active in the organization, becoming an honorary member in 1944.

Lemche's experiences as a women's activist are described in her three-volume semi-autobiographical novel Tempeltjenere (1926–28). She was active in other women's organizations such as Kvindernes Bygning which she chaired from 1916 to 1929. She also served on the board of Dansk Forfatterforening (Danish Authors' Society).

== Death ==
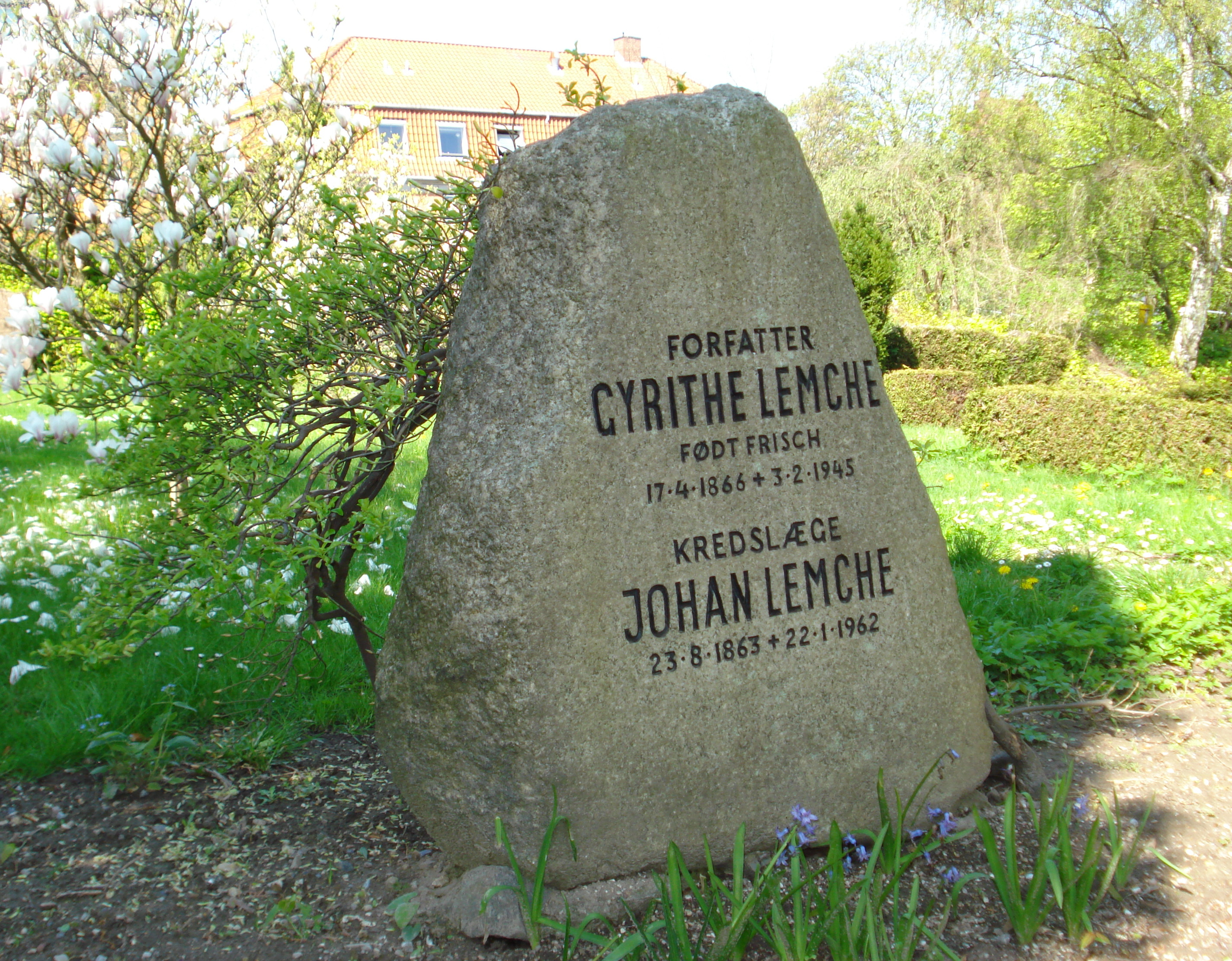
Lemche 's gravestone at Assistens Cemetery in Lyngby

Gyrithe Lemche died on 3 February 1945 in Lyngby. She is buried in Lyngby's Assistens Cemetery.

== Awards and honours ==
Among the many awards she received for her work are the Tagea Brandt Travel Scholarship (1927) and the Ingenio et Arti medal (1934).
