= Hanne Budtz =

Danish politician (1915–2004)

Member of the Folketing for the Nørrebro constituency
- In office 21 April 1953 – 4 December 1973

Personal details
- Born: Olga Johanne Budtz; 21 September 1915 Maribo, Denmark
- Died: 5 March 2004 (aged 88)
- Party: Conservative People's Party
- Spouse: Otto Johan Budtz (m. 1945; died 1972)
- Occupation: Politician
- Awards: Knight First Class of the Order of the Dannebrog

Olga Johanne Budtz (21 September 1915 – 5 March 2004) was a Danish Conservative People's Party politician and lawyer who served as an elected member of the Folketing from 1953 to 1973. She worked as an assistant solicitor at Nykøbing Falster before becoming secretary at the Directorate of Patents and Trademarks and the Directorate of Commodity Supply. Budtz was national chair of the Danish Women's Society from 1951 to 1956 and focused on single mothers, child allowances, part-time work and the end of joint taxation. In the Folketing, she focused on children's, family and women's rights, and was chair of the Conservative People's Party's Women's Committee from 1964 until 1974. Budtz was appointed Knight of the Order of the Dannebrog in 1965 and was upgraded to Knight First Class of the Order of the Dannebrog six years later.

== Early life ==
On 21 September 1915, Budtz was born in Maribo. She was the daughter of the tanner Carl Peter Poulsen and Anne Kirstine Elisabeth Bramsen. Budtz had five siblings and her parents were conservative in business. She became interested in the cause of women through her mother who worked for the Danish Women's Society. In 1933, Budtz became a student at Nykøbing Katedralskole, and graduated with a Candidate of Law degree from University of Copenhagen six years later.

== Career ==
Following graduation, she worked as an assistant solicitor at Nykøbing Falster in 1939. In 1940, Budtz was secretary at the Directorate of Patents and Trademarks and was later secretary of the Directorate of Commodity Supply between 1942 and 1945 as well as its assistant lawyer in 1943. She was appointed a district court lawyer in Copenhagen in 1945, and was permitted to sit in the Supreme Court as one in her position could from 1947. Budtz was afflicated with the Student Legal Aid and the DK Counselling Office from the late 1940s, sharing an office with lawyer Lizzi Moesgaard starting from 1951 that allowed Budzt to have more freedom to pursue her political and women's rights goals.

Between 1951 and 1956, Budtz was the national chairman of the Danish Women's Society, taking over from fellow lawyer and conservative Erna Sørensen. She contended with major agenda issues such as single mothers, child allowances, part-time work and the end of joint taxation. From 1950 to 1959, Budtz was a consultant for Statsradiofonien, specially the women's afternoon programme. She was a government delegate at the international working conferences in Geneva every year from 1951 to 1953. Budtz was a member of the board of Danish National Insurance Institute and was a member of Frederiksberg Municipal Council between 1958 and 1964 and again from 1974 to 1978. She served on the Danish Radio Council and on its program committee from 1959 to 1968.

At the 1950 Danish Folketing election, Budtz unsuccessfully stood for election in the Folketing constituency of Nørrebro as a member of the Conservative People's Party but gained election to the seat at the 1953 Danish Folketing election on 21 April 1953. She focused on children's, family and women's issues, did lectures on family policy, and was chair of the Conservative People's Party's Women's Committee from 1964 until 1974 as well as being a member of the Women's Commission between 1965 and 1974. Budtz was the party's spokesperson on legislation on marriage in an era when marriage was threatened by youth rebellion and sexual liberalisation. She argued for the importance of women to select their own names when the Names Act of 1961, that entitled women to retain their maiden names upon being married, was being debated. Budtz opposed the party leader and future Minister of Finance Poul Møller's position on taxation, believing it would discourage marriage and be unfair to women. She lobbied for free abortions and improved education; Budtz was chair of the committee of the Termination of Pregnancy Act 1970 that eased access for select groups to get an abortion.

Budtz was an advocate of breaking up the state monopoly and allowing for competition, separating radio and television and introducing democratic representation to go alongside listeners' associations. She argued for more broadcasts of modern drama and boxing matches; Budtz was critical of some anti-American broadcasts. She believed that the makers of programmes take responsibility for their own broadcasts and that the Radio Council should only decide on matters of principle and political transmissions. Budtz began debates about the broadcast of election messages on radio and she argued for the need for pre-election curfews. She was an advocate for liberalisation and free competition in the cinema and other forms of entertainment. From 6 February 1968 to 13 December 1973, Budtz was a Member of the Bureau of the Folketing and she was a state auditor between 8 October 1969 and 30 September 1974. She lost her seat in the Folketing on 4 December 1973, when the Conservative People's Party lost 15 seats at the 1973 Danish general election. From 1974 to 1980, Budtz was a member of the National Tax Court. She wrote the family law handbooks The Rights of Women in Marriage – and of Men in 1968 and About Deaths in 1984.

== Personal life ==
From 23 August 1945 to 6 June 1972, she was married to the engineer Otto Johan Budtz. Budtz was appointed Knight of the Order of the Dannebrog in 1965, and was upgraded to Knight First Class of the Order of the Dannebrog six years later. She died on 5 March 2004 and was given a burial at Maribo Cemetery.
