= Kvindelig Fremskridtsforening =

Danish women's organization

The Kvindelig Fremskridtsforening (KF), or Women's Progress Association, was a Danish women's association which was founded in 1885 by Matilde Bajer and Elisabeth Ouchterlony. They had both been co-founders of the Danish Women's Society (Dansk Kvindesamfund) in 1871 but now wanted an organization which included specific attention to women's suffrage in municipal and national elections, an issue which was not on the agenda of the apolitical Women's Society. The organization also addressed women's involvement as peace activists and as members of the workforce.

In 1888, with the support and involvement of Johanne Meyer, KF arranged the first meeting of the Nordic Women's Movement (Nordisk Kvindesagsmøde) which was held in Copenhagen in connection with the Nordic Exhibition. Open to both men and women, it attracted 700 participants from Norway, Sweden, Finland and Iceland.

KF was restricted to women. Members came mainly from the political left and the trade unions, creating opposition to the Women's Society. Bajer was the first president of the KF from 1886 to 1889, after which she served on the board. Ouchterlony, a journalist, contributed to the organization's journal Hvad vi vil (What We Want). She was also an effective public speaker. From 1888, Meyer was editor of Hvad vi vil, to which she contributed many articles. She became president of KF in 1889.

In 1889, many members of the KF left to set up the Kvindevalgretsforeningen (Women's Suffrage Association) which, as its name implies, was even more strongly focused on suffrage. As a result, interest in the KF diminished and it was dissolved in 1893.
