= Detlefsen =

Detlefsen is a surname. Notable people with the surname include:

- Linda Detlefsen (born 1962), American middle-distance runner
- Michael Detlefsen (1948–2019), American philosopher
- Paul Detlefsen (1899–1986), Danish-born American commercial artist
- Otto Detlefsen (1880s–1963), Danish opera singer
