= Severine Casse =

Danish women's rights activist

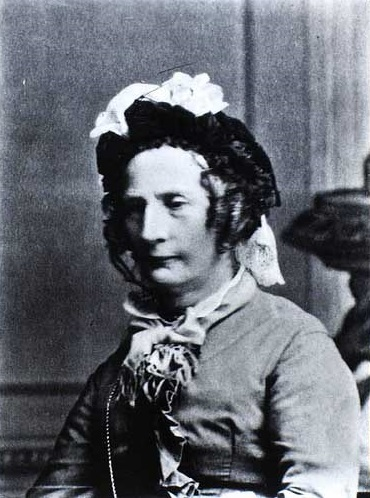
Severine Casse

Severine Andrea Casse née Engelbreth (1805–1898) was a Danish women's rights activist and an influential member of the Danish Women's Society. Intent on social and political reforms for women, she successfully fought for a wife's right to dispose of her own earnings.

== Biography ==
Born on 15 November 1805 in Lyderslev on the Stevns Peninsula, Severine Andrea Engelbreth was the daughter of the provost Wolf Frederik Engelbreth (1771–1862) and Kirstine Marie Petersen (1779–1868). Thanks to her father, she came into contact with many of Zealand's religious figures. In 1930, she married Andreas Lorentz Casse, the Danish minister of justice, with whom she had seven children.

From 1871 to 1873, she was a member of the board of the Danish Women's Society where she fought for changes in the marriage laws. She successfully involved the jurist Carl Goos (1835–1917), encouraging him to work with the pacifist politician Fredrik Bajer who stood for a wife's right to dispose of the income she had earned. With the support of the Danish Women's Society, new legislation along these lines was introduced on 7 May 1880 under the so-called Bajer's Law (Bajerske lov).

A talented public speaker, Casse was one of the oldest and most respected members of the Danish Women's Society. When she was 90, she was granted the status of honorary member.

Severine Casse died in the Frederiksberg district of Copenhagen on 20 October 1898.
