= Matilde Bajer =

Danish women's rights activist and pacifist

Pauline Matilde Theodora Bajer
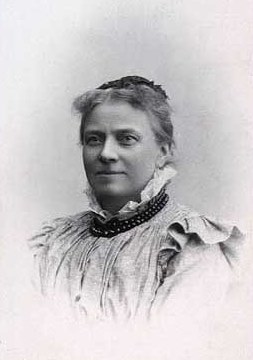
- Matilde Bajer c. 1890
- Born: Pauline Matilde Theodora Schlüter; 4 January 1840; Frederikseg, Herlufmagle Sogn, Næstved Municipality, Denmark.
- Died: 4 March 1934 (aged 94); Copenhagen, Denmark
- Occupations: Feminist, Pacifist
- Spouse: Fredrik Bajer

Pauline Matilde Theodora Bajer (4 January 1840 – 4 March 1934) was a Danish women's rights activist and pacifist.

== Life ==
Pauline Matilde Theodora Schlüter was born on 4 January 1840 in Frederikseg, Herlufmagle Sogn, Næstved Municipality, Denmark. Her father was a landowner. She married Fredrik Bajer, whom she had known since adolescence, and convinced him that women should have an equal position to men in society. For a short period Mathilde Bajer was chairperson of the Danish Women's Society (Dansk Kvindesamfund), which she helped found in 1871. In 1885 she was co-founder and a leading member of the political wing of the Women's Progress Association (Kvindelig Fremskridtsforening) which fought for women's suffrage, and succeeded in 1915.

Mathilde and her husband always supported each other, and Mathilde Bajer was active in the Danish Peace Society (Dansk Fredsforening) to which Fredrik Bajer was dedicated. The English Quaker and pacifist Priscilla Hannah Peckover met Fredrik and Matilde Bajer at a Nordic Women's meeting in 1888. Peckover paid Matilde Bajer's expenses so that she could participate in international peace meetings. Mathilde Bajer died on 4 March 1934 in Copenhagen.

== See also ==
- List of peace activists

== Sources ==
- "Peckover, Priscilla Hannah". Det Danske Fredsakademi.
- Schlüter, F (2015). "Pauline Matilde Theodora Bajer". Gravsted.dk.
