= Fredrik Bajer =

Danish politician (1837–1922)

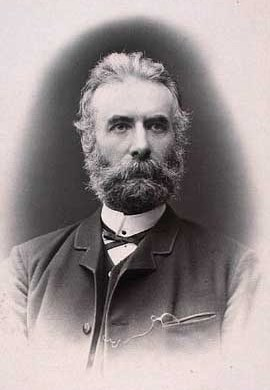
- Born: 21 April 1837; Næstved, Denmark
- Died: 22 January 1922 (aged 84); Copenhagen, Denmark
- Occupations: writer, politician, teacher
- Spouse: Matilde Bajer
- Writing career
- Notable awards: 1908 Nobel Peace Prize

Fredrik Bajer (21 April 1837 – 22 January 1922) was a Danish writer, teacher, and pacifist politician who received the Nobel Peace Prize in 1908 together with Klas Pontus Arnoldson.

== Life ==
He was son of a clergyman born in Næstved in 1837. Bajer served as an officer in the Danish army, fighting in the 1864 war against Prussia and Austria where he was promoted to the rank of first lieutenant. He was discharged in 1865, and moved to Copenhagen where he became a teacher, translator and writer.

He entered the Danish Parliament in 1872 as a member of Folketinget and held a seat there for the following 23 years. As a member of parliament, he worked for the use of international arbitration to solve conflicts among nations, and it Bajer's efforts that caused foreign relations became part of the work of the Danish Parliament and that Denmark participated in the Inter-Parliamentary Union from the beginning and earned a distinguished position among its members.

He supported the early women's suffrage organisation and many peace organizations, including the International Peace Bureau, both inside Denmark and Europe-wide, and he helped guide the passage of a bill to reach arbitration agreements with Sweden and Norway.
