= Danish Women's Society =

Danish women's rights organisation

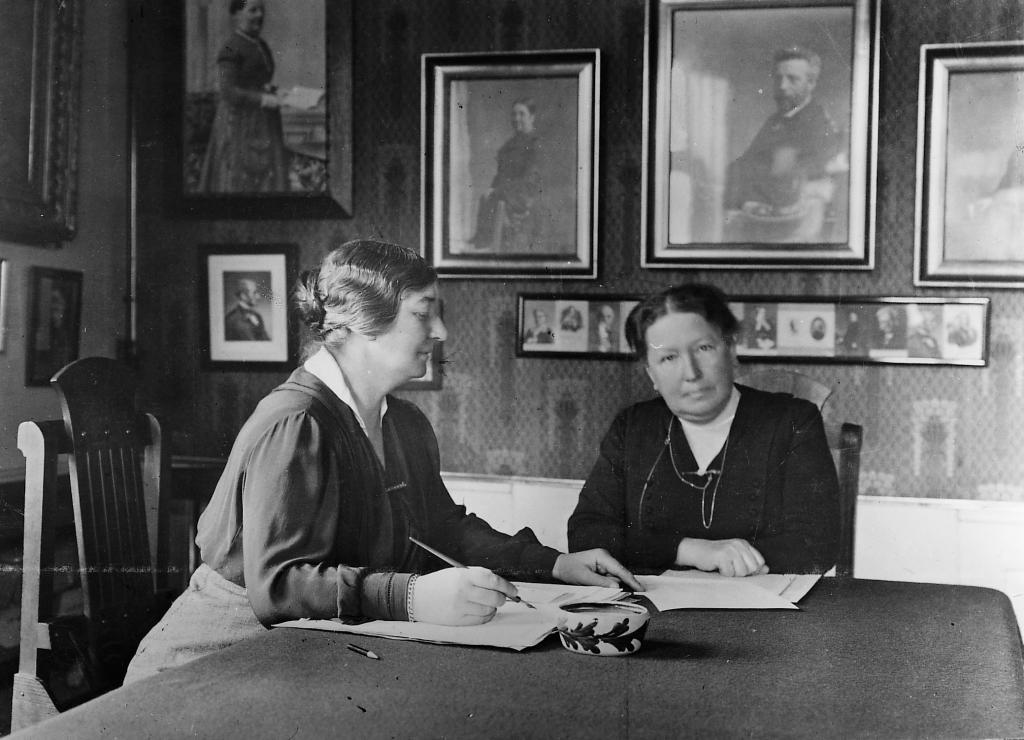
Julie Arenholt and Gyrithe Lemche in 1922. Both headed the Danish Women's Society.

The Danish Women's Society or DWS (Danish: Dansk Kvindesamfund) is Denmark's oldest women's rights organization. It was founded in 1871 by activist Matilde Bajer and her husband Fredrik Bajer; Fredrik was a Member of Parliament and the 1908 Nobel Peace Prize laureate. The association stands for an inclusive, intersectional and progressive liberal feminism, and advocates for the rights of all women and girls and LGBT rights. It publishes the world's oldest women's magazine, Kvinden & Samfundet (Woman and Society), established in 1885. The Danish Women's Society is a member of the International Alliance of Women and is a sister association of the Norwegian Association for Women's Rights and the Icelandic Women's Rights Association.

== History ==
Founded in 1871, the organization was inspired by Mathilde Bajer's membership of the Danish local branch of the Swiss Association internationale des femmes and her husband's interest in women's emancipation. The Women's Society set out to provide organized support for middle-class women. From the start, it was not affiliated to any political party. It strove to enhance the spiritual and economic status of women, making them more independent and providing an improved basis for self-employment. Initially, the emphasis was on women's access to education and on authorizing married women to have access to their own financial resources.

=== 1871–1906 ===
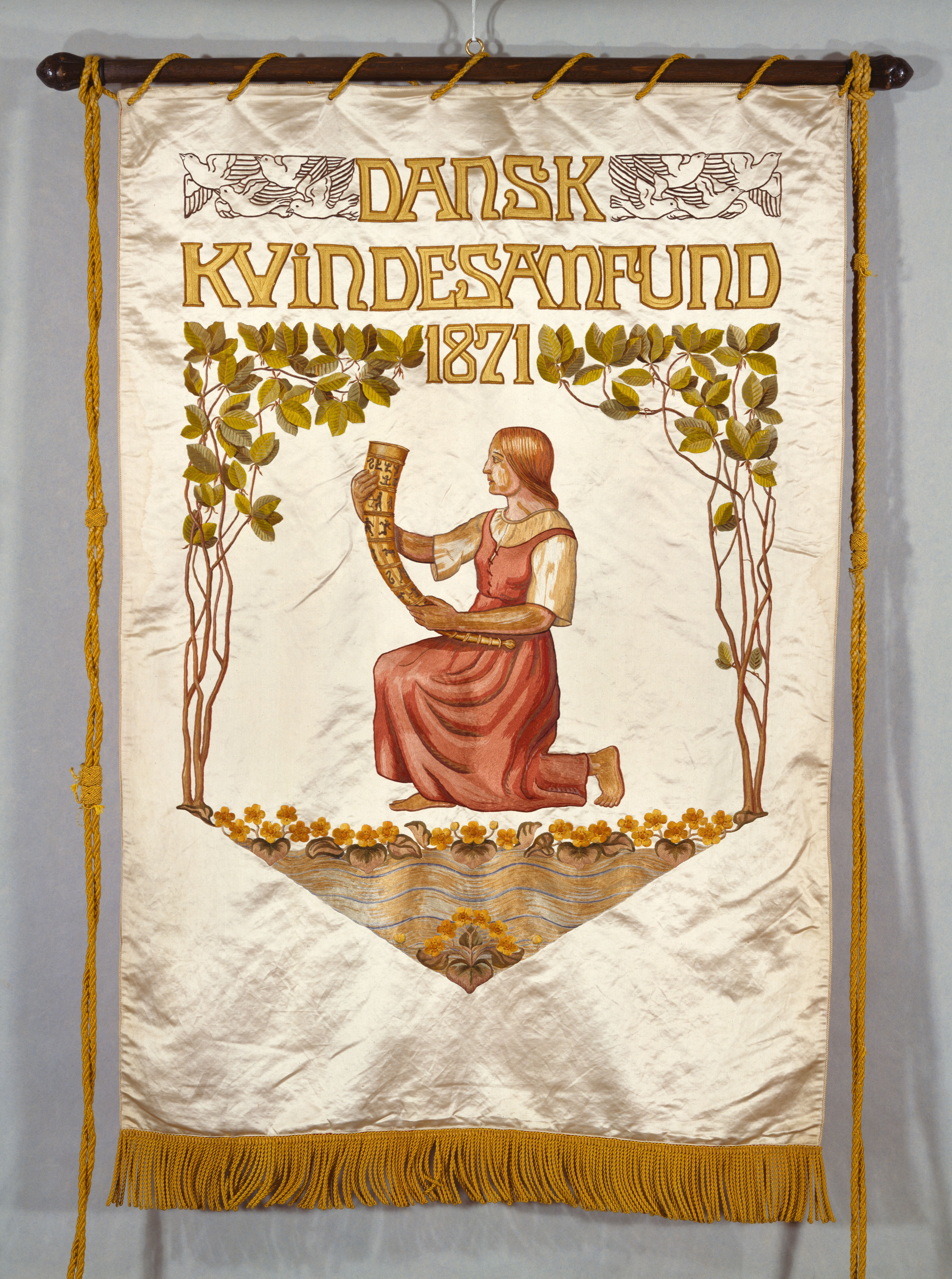
Dansk Kvindesamfund banner, 1887

In 1872, DWS opened a training school for women, Dansk Kvindesamfund Handelsskolen, followed in 1874 by a Sunday school for working women, Søndagsskolen for Kvinder, and in 1895 by a women's school of art, Tegneskolen for Kvinder.

=== 1906–1940 ===
From 1906, attention was given to voting rights for women. This led to constitutional changes in 1915, giving women the right to vote in elections to the Rigsdag or national parliament. Further attention was given to equality of employment and to general improvements in conditions for women and children. In 1919, this led to legislation improving salaries for women in public service and in 1921 to equal access for women and men to public positions.

Between the two world wars, action was taken to prevent the firing of pregnant women in the public sector and to call for reforms providing possibilities for pregnant women to give birth, thus preventing abortions. As a result, assistance centres for mothers (mødrehjælpsinstitutioner) were set up throughout the country.

=== 1940–1950 ===
Under the German occupation, DWS helped to establish Danske Kvinders Beredskab, an organisation devoted to civil defence and preparedness, covering medical care and evacuation during bombing raids. Attention was given to women out of work and the social problems of single women.

After the 1943 elections under which only two women were elected to the Folketing, efforts were made to encourage wider representation. Action calling for women priests led to legislative reforms in 1947.

=== 1950–1970 ===
In the 1950s and 1960s, the main concern was social policy, especially in connection with single mothers. There was also support for homegoing housewives and for retraining women who had been out of work for some time. There were also calls for more kindergartens.

== Policies ==
=== LGBTQA rights ===
The Danish Women's Society supports LGBTQA rights. The society has stated that it takes homophobia and transphobia very seriously, that "we support all initiatives that promote the rights of gay and transgender people" and that "we see the LGBTQA movement as close allies in the struggle against inequality and we fight together for a society where gender and sexuality do not limit an individual."

== Presidents ==
The presidents of the Danish Women's Society over the years have been:

- Matilde Bajer (1871)
- Severine Casse (1871–1872)
- Caroline Testman (1872–1883)
- Marie Rovsing (1883–1887)
- Kirstine Frederiksen (1887–1894)
- Jutta Bojsen-Møller (1894–1910)
- Marie Riising Rasmussen (1910–1912)
- Astrid Stampe Feddersen (1912–1918)
- Julie Arenholt (1918–1921)
- Gyrithe Lemche (1921–1922)
- Karen Hessel (1922–1924)
- Elisa Petersen (1924–1931)
- Marie Hjelmer (1931–1936)
- Edel Saunte (1936–1941)
- Andrea Hedegaard (1941–1943)
- Ingrid Larsen (1943–1947)
- Margrethe Petersen (1947–1948)
- Erna Sørensen (1948–1951)
- Hanne Budtz (1951–1956)
- Karen Rasmussen (1956–1958)
- Lis Groes (1958–1964)
- Inger Wilfred Jensen (1963–1966)
- Nathalie Lind (1966–1968)
- Eva Hemmer Hansen (1968–1971)
- Grete Munk (1971–1974)
- Grethe Fenger Møller (1974–1981)
- Jytte Thorbek (1981–1983)
- Helle Jarlmose (1983–1987)
- Lene Pind (1987–1991)
- Benthe Stig (1991–1993)
- Brita Foged (1993–1995)
- Lenie Persson (1995–1999)
- Karen Hallberg (1999–2011)
- Lisa Holmfjord (2011–present)

== Literature ==
- Gyrithe Lemche: Dansk Kvindesamfund gennem 40 Aar (1912)
- Eva Hemmer Hansen: Blåstrømper, rødstrømper, uldstrømper. Dansk Kvindesamfunds historie i 100 år, Grevas, 1970
