= Anna Petersen =

Danish painter (1845–1910)

- Born: 20 February 1845; Copenhagen, Denmark
- Died: 6 August 1910 (aged 65); Rønne, Denmark
- Known for: Painting

Breton Girl Looking After Plants in the Hothouse (Danish: Bretagne-pige ordner planter i et drivhus), 1884

Anna Sophie Petersen (20 February 1845 – 6 August 1910) was a Danish painter. Although she showed some promise as an artist, specifically in genre painting, she struggled to find a place in the male-dominated Danish art world of the late 19th and early 20th centuries. Her work fell out of fashion and she was largely forgotten until the end of the 20th century when the Hirschsprung Collection and Statens Museum for Kunst acquired some of her more important works.

== Biography ==
Petersen was born on 20 February 1845 in Copenhagen. She grew up in comfortable circumstances and was afforded what was then, for a woman, the rare opportunity to train as a painter. Kasper Monrad, a senior research curator at Statens Museum for Kunst, believes that there are few Danish female artists known from Petersen's time because it was difficult for them to gain access to the Royal Danish Academy of Fine Arts; it would have been inappropriate for them to paint male nudes and socially acceptable subjects were limited, with still life, particularly flowers, seen as most appropriate.

Petersen began her training in Copenhagen at the Tegneskolen for Kvinder (Design School for Women) and later went to France where she was apprenticed to Jean-Jacques Henner in Paris. Henner believed she showed promise as an artist. She returned to Copenhagen and in 1890 she studied at Kunstskole for Kvinder (Women's Art School) which had been newly established by the Academy of Fine Arts in 1888.

Petersen initially focused mainly on figure painting with some portraiture, but slowly developed her interest in genre art; her works depicting common people at home or in church are among her most successful. In her time, Petersen was acknowledged for her strong sense of realism. Stylistically her work is reminiscent of Hans Smidth, L. A. Ring and Niels Bjerre, but her approach to her subject matter is completely different, and her composition recalls that of the German artist Fritz von Uhde. In 1889, she took a trip with Jens Ferdinand Willumsen to Spain where she produced the highly praised Kloster i Granada (Convent in Granada) and a number of good sketches.

In 1883 she made her debut at Charlottenborg Forårsudstilling (Charlottenborg Spring Exhibition), and she exhibited there again several times until 1910. During the 1880s she exhibited her works abroad several times Anna Petersen exhibited her work at the Palace of Fine Arts at the 1893 World's Columbian Exposition in Chicago, Illinois. She also exhibited at the Exposition Universelle in Paris in 1889, where she met up with Willumsen and other Nordic artists including a large contingent from the Skagen Painters.

Petersen began to doubt her abilities and slowly lost the courage to exhibit; at the same time, her work fell out of fashion and no museums were interested in buying her work during her lifetime. The first major purchase of her work was in 1991 when the Hirschsprung Collection acquired Under gudstjenesten (1890). She visited Skagen in 1889 and made several trips to Italy during the 1900s.

Petersen died on 6 August 1910 in Rønne and is buried in Assistens Cemetery in Copenhagen.

== Works ==
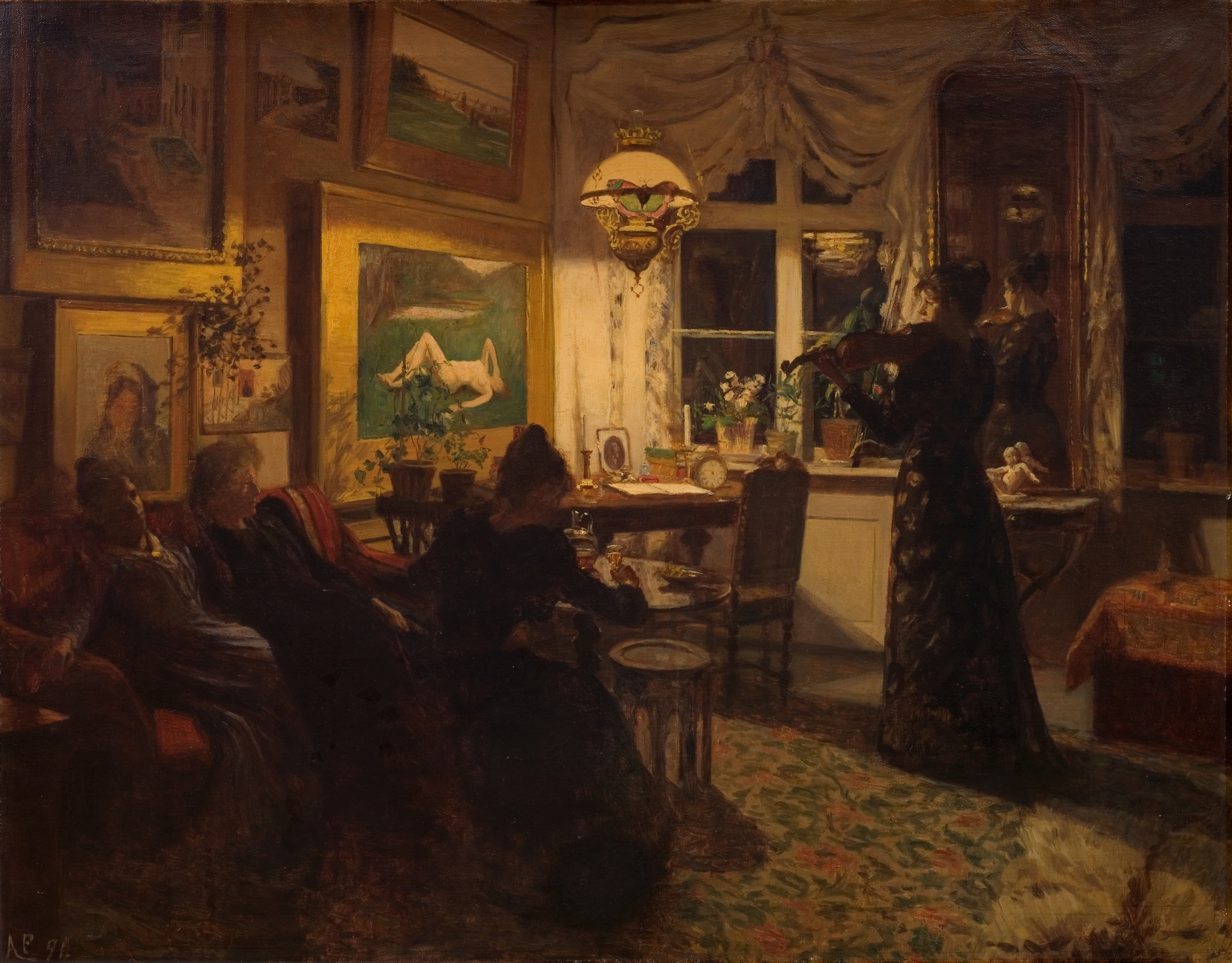
An Evening with Girlfriends. By Lamplight (Danish: En Aften Hos Veninde. Ved Lampelys), 1891. The women seen in the picture are Bertha Wegmann (lying down), Jeanna Bauck and Marie Krøyer

Petersen's 1884 painting Breton girl looking after plants in a hothouse (Danish: Bretagne-pige ordner planter i et drivhus) takes a subject that was traditionally thought appropriate for women to paint: plants, and subverts it so that the focus becomes the Breton girl that is tending them. There are hints of an underlying darkness in the picture; the overturned pot among the hothouse plants is a motif of death and the girl appears both vital and tightly constrained; this may just be because she has been posed as a model but it has been suggested that the sense of restrained energy indicates her powerful inner life has swept away her focus from her everyday tasks.

Her painting En Aften Hos Veninde. Ved Lampelys (An Evening with Girlfriends. By Lamplight) from 1891 has drawn attention because an investigation by the Hirschsprung Collection after it acquired the picture revealed that the women were all contemporary artists, the Danish painters Marie Krøyer and Bertha Wegmann and the Swedish painter Jeanna Bauck are sat listening to the Danish violinist Frida Schytte. The discovery that Petersen had gathered together these Scandinavian pioneers for the movement for women's right to express themselves in the arts imbued the painting with a certain emblematic quality. The Hirschsprung Collection held a small exhibition in 2009 focusing on Petersen's work, which up to that point, had largely been forgotten, and included the picture again in a 2015 exhibition of the work of seven female artists held celebrate the centenary of the introduction of women's suffrage in Denmark. (Note: The other artists featured were Marie Krøyer, Anna Ancher, Agnes Slott-Møller, Anna Syberg, Bertha Wegmann and Edma Frølich Stage) Claus Grymer, writing for Kristeligt Dagblad in a review of the 2012 "Masterpieces of the Hirschsprung Collection" exhibition at the Ribe Kunstmuseum noted that the painting showed a certain ambiguity; it is not clear if the women are intent on the music or lost in their own thoughts.

Petersen produced only one known piece of sculpture, a monument for her parents' grave in Assistens Cemetery in Copenhagen; it is possible that she was taught to sculpt by Willumsen or another friend, Carl Johan Bonnesen.

== Sources ==
- Svanholm, Lise (2004). Northern Light: The Skagen Painters. Gyldendal A/S. ISBN 978-87-02-02817-1.
