= Simon Steen-Andersen =

Danish composer

Simon Steen-Andersen (born 1976) is a Danish composer, performer, director and media artist.

== Biography ==
Steen-Andersen studied composition with Karl Aage Rasmussen, Mathias Spahlinger, Gabriel Valverde, and Bent Sørensen in Aarhus, Freiburg, Buenos Aires and Copenhagen between 1998 and 2006. Since 2008 he has taught composition at The Royal Academy of Music, Aarhus, and since 2018 he has held been a professor in the Composition and Music Theatre department at University of the Arts Bern. In 2016 he became a member of the German Academy of the Arts, and in 2018 he was appointed as a member of the Royal Swedish Academy of Music. He currently lives in Berlin.

Well known for his original and uncompromising compositions, which often exist in a grey area between artforms, he has achieved international recognition. His works have been performed and broadcast all over the world and he has received commissions from, among others, Ensemble Modern, Ensemble Recherche, Ensemble Musikfabrik, Percussion de Strasbourg, Jack Quartet, Danish National Symphony Orchestra, Gothenburg Symphony Orchestra, SWR Symphonieorchester, Staatsoper Berlin, Opéra national du Rhin and Munich Biennale.

His output ranges from instrumental music, which typically employs a whole range of performance techniques and electronic elements, to video performances such as RunTime Error (2009–2022) and music theater. Other works of particular note include On And Off And To And Fro (2008), for soprano saxophone, vibraphone, double bass, and 3 players with megaphones; Piano Concerto (2014), for piano, sampler, orchestra and video; and TRIO (2019) for orchestra, choir, bigband and video. His music is published by Edition·S.

A work that typifies his playing with, and challenging of, existing conventions is Black Box Music (2012). The piece is scored for percussion solo, amplified box, 15 instruments and video, yet the conductor is the percussionist and carries out their duties with their hands in the amplified ‘black box’. The ensemble performs not on the stage but in three locations around the audience, being conducted by a video projection of the conductor that takes up the stage.

== Awards and honours ==
Beginning with his String Quartet (1999), he has received numerous awards over recent years. For his grand multimedia work TRIO, he received the SWR Orchestra Prize and the Danish prize Carl Prisen 2020. In 2017 he received the Mauricio Kagel Music Prize and the Ernst von Siemens Composer Prize. In 2014 he was awarded the Nordic Council Music Prize for his work Black Box Music and he received the SWR Orchesterpreis 2014 for his Piano Concerto. In 2013 he was awarded the honorary Carl Nielsen Prize. Back in 2010 he was the first Dane ever to win first prize at the International Rostrum of Composers in the category of composers over 30. After being a featured composer at the Ultra Schall Festival für neue Musik in 2011, Dacapo Records released portrait-CD of his compositions performed by the Norwegian ensemble asamisimasa. Selected other honours include: the Holmboe prize (2008), Présences China (2008), Kranichsteiner Musikpreis (2008), Sonning Music Foundation Talent Award (2006), Arts Foundation's 3-year working grant (2006), Bisballes Artist Prize (2005).

In a 2017 Classic Voice poll of the greatest works of art music since 2000, the number of total votes received by Steen-Andersen's pieces was the second highest (35), surpassed only by the compositions of Georg Friedrich Haas (49).

== Compositions ==
- Staging of Stockhausen’s “Music in the Belly” – for 6 performers (2022)
- THE RETURN (a.k.a. Run Time Error @ Venice feat. Monteverdi) – music theatre for three singers, baroque ensemble, objects and video (80') (2022)
- TRANSIT – staged concert for tuba, ensemble and live-endoscopy (55') (2021)
- Walk the Walk – music theatre for four performers, treadmills, objects, light and smoke (90') (2020)
- The Loop of the Nibelung – a.k.a. Run Time Error @ Bayreuth, for performer, 2 singers, 15 musicians and video (online-version 37') (live-version 60') (2020)
- TRIO – for orchestra, choir, bigband and video (48') (2019)
- ‍Automata Etudes – video-miniatures for robotic arm and instruments in collaboration with Michael Madsen (2019)
- Asthma – for accordion and video (22') (2017)
- if this then that and now what – music theatre for 4 actors and 18 musicians (135') (2016)
- Korpus – for three Harry Partch-instruments and 7–8 players (12') (2015)
- Piano Concerto – for piano, sampler, orchestra and video (28') (2014)
- Buenos Aires – music theatre in 5 scenes for 5 singers and 4 musicians (85') (2014)
- Mono (Autotune Study and Nachgesang) – for male voice, keyboard and electronics (7') (2014)
- Inszenierte Nacht – staging pieces by Bach, Schumann, Mozart and Ravel in collaboration with Ensemble Ascolta (55') (2013)
- Black Box Music – for conductor/percussionist, amplified black box, and fifteen players (32') (2012)
- String Quartet No.2 (2012)
- Im Rauschen – for piccolo flute (playable for non-flutist), flute and bass clarinet with intra-instrumental playback (10') (2012)
- History of my Instrument – for harp and video playback (9') (2011)
- Study for String Instrument # 3 – for cello and video (5') (2011)
- Double Up – for sampler and chamber orchestra (18') (2010)
- Ouvertures – for enhanced gu zheng, sampler and orchestra (15') (2008/2010)
- Study for String Instrument # 2 – for string (s) and whammy pedal (5'-6') (2007)
- Run Time Error – video installation / performance (2009)
- Self Simulator – "interactive installation" (2009)
- Pretty Sound (Up And Down) – for amplified piano (pianist or percussionist) (7'30) (2008)
- Beloved Brother – two movements from JS Bach's Cappriccio on the departure of his Dearly Beloved brother arranged for "backing guitar" (7') (2008)
- On And Off And To And Fro – for vibraphone, soprano saxophone, bass and 3 musicians with megaphones (15') (2008)
- SoundTAG – epidemic audio installation (space, street and web), in collaboration with Kaj Aune (2008)
- Ouvertures – for enhanced gu zheng, sampler and orchestra (8') (2008)
- Study for String Instrument # 1 (3'30-4'30) (2007)
- Nothing Integrated – for extremely amplified clarinet, percussion, cello and live video (21') (2007)
- In Her Frown – for 2 amplified sopranos (12') (2007)
- In Spite Of, And Maybe Even Derfor – for amplified flute, horn, clarinet + unreinforced contra bassoon, piano, percussion and double bass (9') (2007)
- Chambered Music – for 12 instruments and samples (11') (2007)
- Loloopop – audio / visual installation created in collaboration with Danish artist Carl Krull (2006)
- [Speech sounds] – interactive webpage on the occasion of the one hundredth anniversary of Norway's independence (2005)
- Within Amongst – anti-kadenza for amplified guitar solo (5') (2005)
- Amongst – concerto for extremely amplified guitar and orchestra (33') (2005)
- Next To Beside Besides # 1–13 (+ ...) – amplified solo pieces, which can also be played simultaneously or in rates in all combinations of (cello,) bass (2 different pieces), saxophone, accordion ( 2 pieces), percussion (3 pieces), piccolo flute, violin, piano, guitar (2 pieces) and camera ... (3'30") (2003–2015)
- Amid – for flute, clarinet, piano, guitar, percussion, violin and cello (with amplification) (9') (2004)
- Beside Besides ( Next To Beside Besides # 0) – fragment for cello solo (with optional amplification) (4'30) (2003)
- Besides – for amplified piano, violin and flute, and "soft" string trio (18') (2003)
- Drownwords – for amplified soprano and amplified guitar (10') (2003)
- Rerendered – for pianist and two assistants (amplified piano) (optional participating conductor & optional live video) (10') (2003, rev. '04)
- Among (Unattended Ones) – for 2 percussionists with adjustable gain (12') (2002)
- Split Point – for snare drum, sandpaper and S (one musician) (12') (2002)
- Spin-Off – for soprano saxophone, optional trumpet, accordion and double bass (3') (2002)
- Praesens – for 14 musicians (16') (2001)
- Electro Miniature (the band) (2'30) (2001)
- In-side-out-side-in ... for guitar solo (10') (2001)
- De Profundis – for soprano saxophone (which also serves percussion) (12') (2000)
- Impromptu – for English horn, bass clarinet, bassoon and baryton saxophone (2000)
- String Quartet (10') (1999)
- Punctus Contra Punctum – for organ (1999)
- Polaroid – a saxophone collage of short film Polaroid (for tape) (1999)
- Sinfonietta Variations – for sinfonietta and saxophone (1999)
- Aurora – Ritual for Orchestra (1999)
- Study for Percussion and Saxophone (1999)
- 4 Petitesses – for solo cello (1998)
- Suite for Ensemble (1998)

== Discography ==
- Drownwords, Complete Works for Guitar, Francesco Palmieri: classical & electric guitar, Brian Archinal: performer, Ensemble VERTIGO der Hochschule der Künste Bern, Lennart Dohms: conductor, Contrastes Records (2020)
- Simon Steen-Andersen: Pretty Sound – Solo and chamber works. Performed by Asamisimasa. Dacapo Records, 2011. Cat.No. 8.226523. Includes: On And Off And To And Fro (2008), Rerendered (2003), Pretty Sound (Up and Down) (2009), Study for String Instrument #2 (2009)
- Praesens/Presents. Danish Contemporary Music for 14 Musicians. SNYK. Copenhagen, Denmark (2003).
- getString (compilation). Performed by the Silesian String Quartet. Dacapo Records, 2010. Cat No. 8.226530. Includes: String Quartet (1999)
- Reciprocity (compilation). Performed by Nico Couck. ChampdAction/Recordings, 2013. Includes: 'in-side-out-side-in...' (2001)

== External links / references ==
- Simon Steen-Andersen's homepage
- Edition·S profile
- Dacapo Records profile
- DR's article on the victory rostrum
- Program for Ultra Schall Festival für neue Musik 2011
