= Carl Ernst Forberg =

German engraver (1844-1915)

Carl (Karl) Ernst Forberg (20 October 1844 – 9 April 1915) was a German engraver, etcher and painter of the Düsseldorf school of painting.

== Life ==
Born in Düsseldorf, Forberg was born the son of the Leipzig-born musician Fritz Forberg, who as a pupil of Julius Rietz was a sought-after cello, violin, piano and organ player in Düsseldorf's musical life. He was solo cellist for Robert Schumann and organist at the Garrison Church in Düsseldorf. His son Carl Ernst attended the Kunstakademie Düsseldorf from 1858. There his teachers were Joseph Wintergerst, Andreas and Karl Müller, Heinrich Mücke and Rudolf Wiegmann. From 1860, he was trained in the techniques of copperplate engraving by Joseph von Keller, the founder of a school of copperplate engraving at the Kunstakademie. At the end of the 1860s he went to Vienna. There he worked for Karl von Lützow's art journal Zeitschrift für Bildende Kunst and from 1872 as head of the Gesellschaft für vervielfältigende Kunst. In 1879, he succeeded Keller as professor of copperplate engraving at the Kunstakademie. He held this post until 1911, and for a time he was deputy director of the art academy. In addition, he made his mark at the end of the 1870s through his involvement in the Düsseldorfer Radirclub and at the turn of the century by founding the Düsseldorfer Akademischer Verein "Laetitia". Forberg's son, Kurt Forberg (1900-1979), became a successful private banker who, from the 1950s onwards, amassed a collection of Modern art. and in 1961 established the Ernst Forberg Foundation, named after his father, to support and promote the Kunstakademie. Carl Ernst Forberg's brother, Wilhelm Forberg (1864–1899), also worked as an engraver in Düsseldorf.

== Work ==
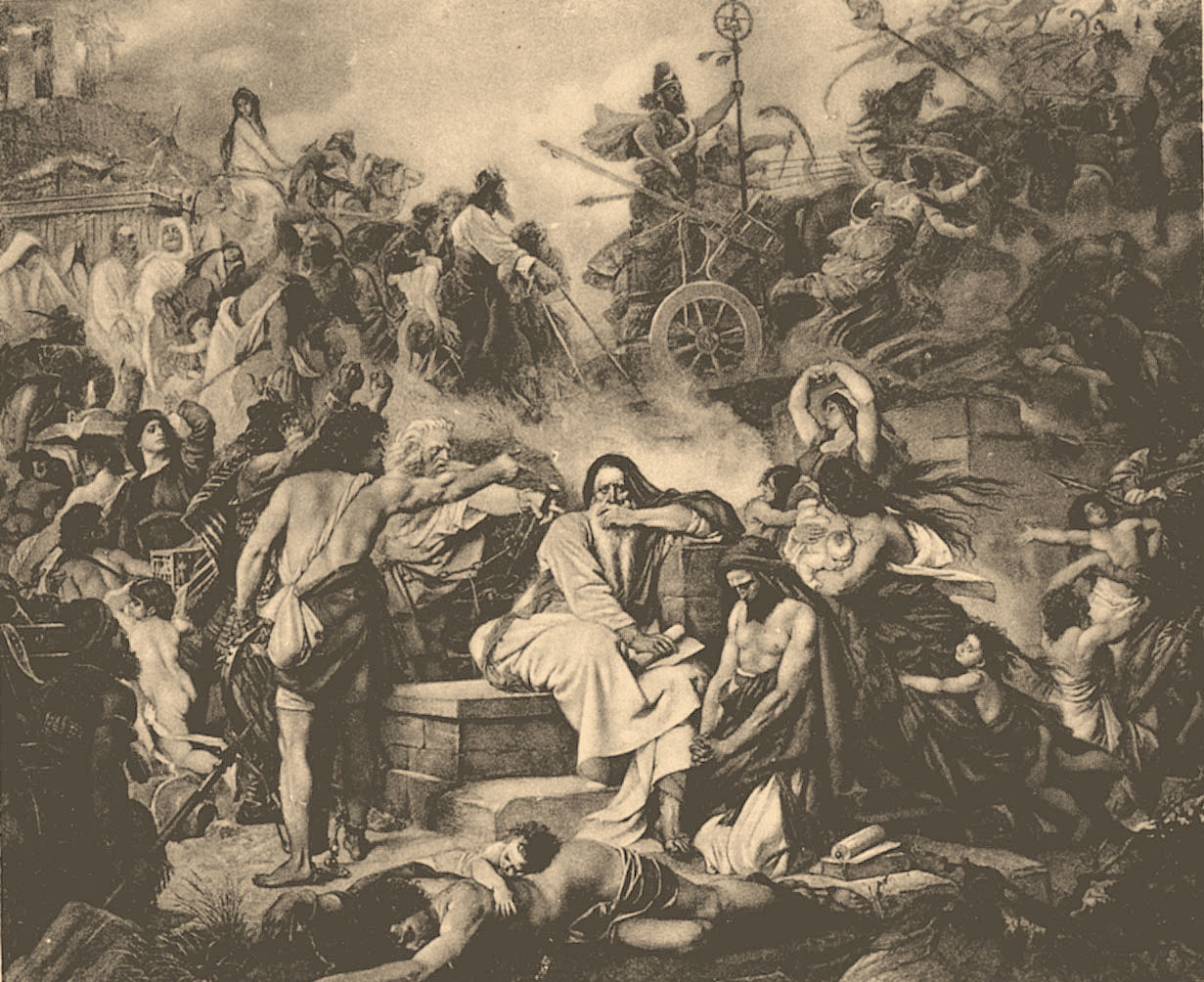
Die Wegführung der Juden in die Babylonische Gefangenschaft (after Eduard Bendemann)

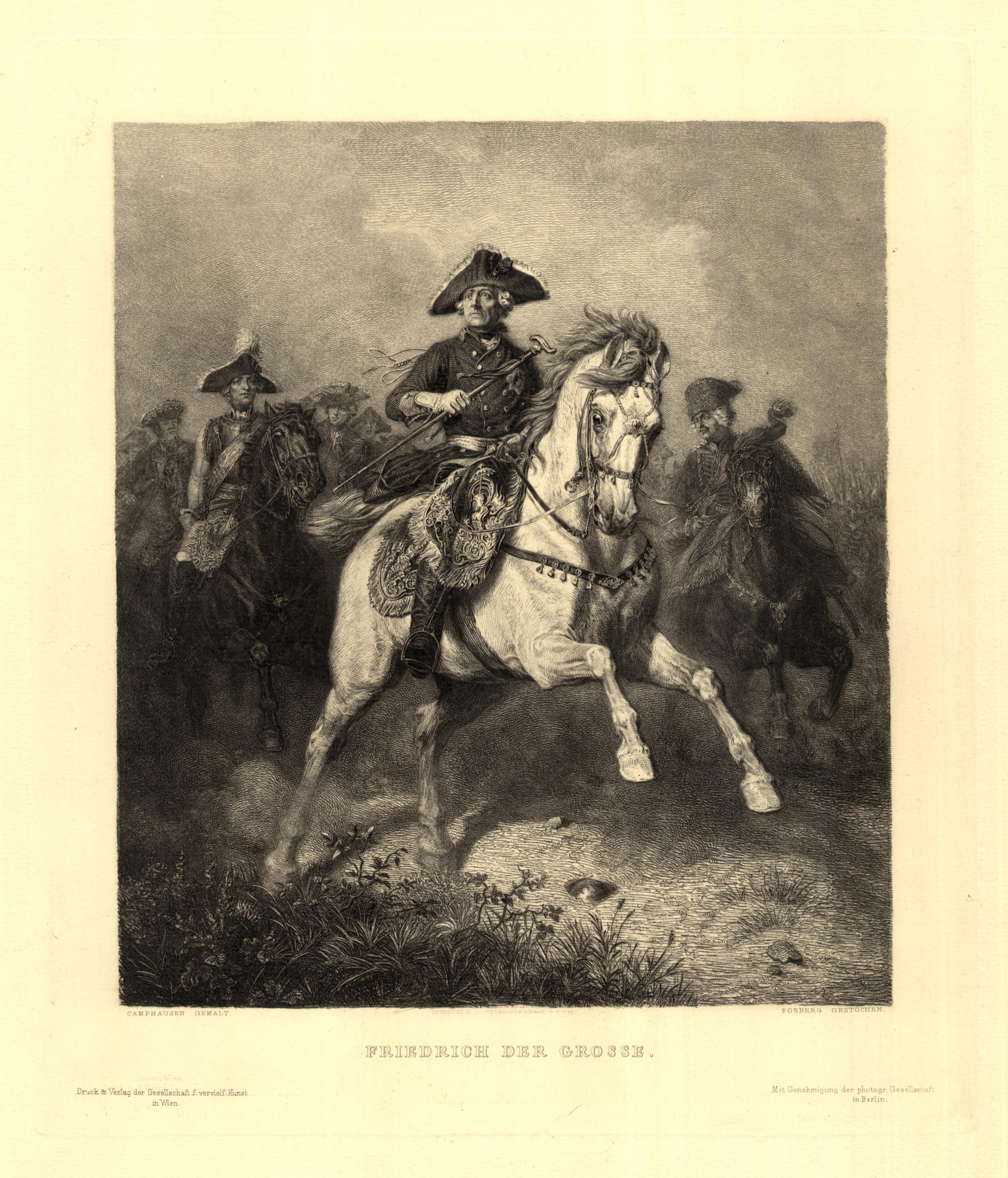
Friedrich der Große (after Wilhelm Camphausen)

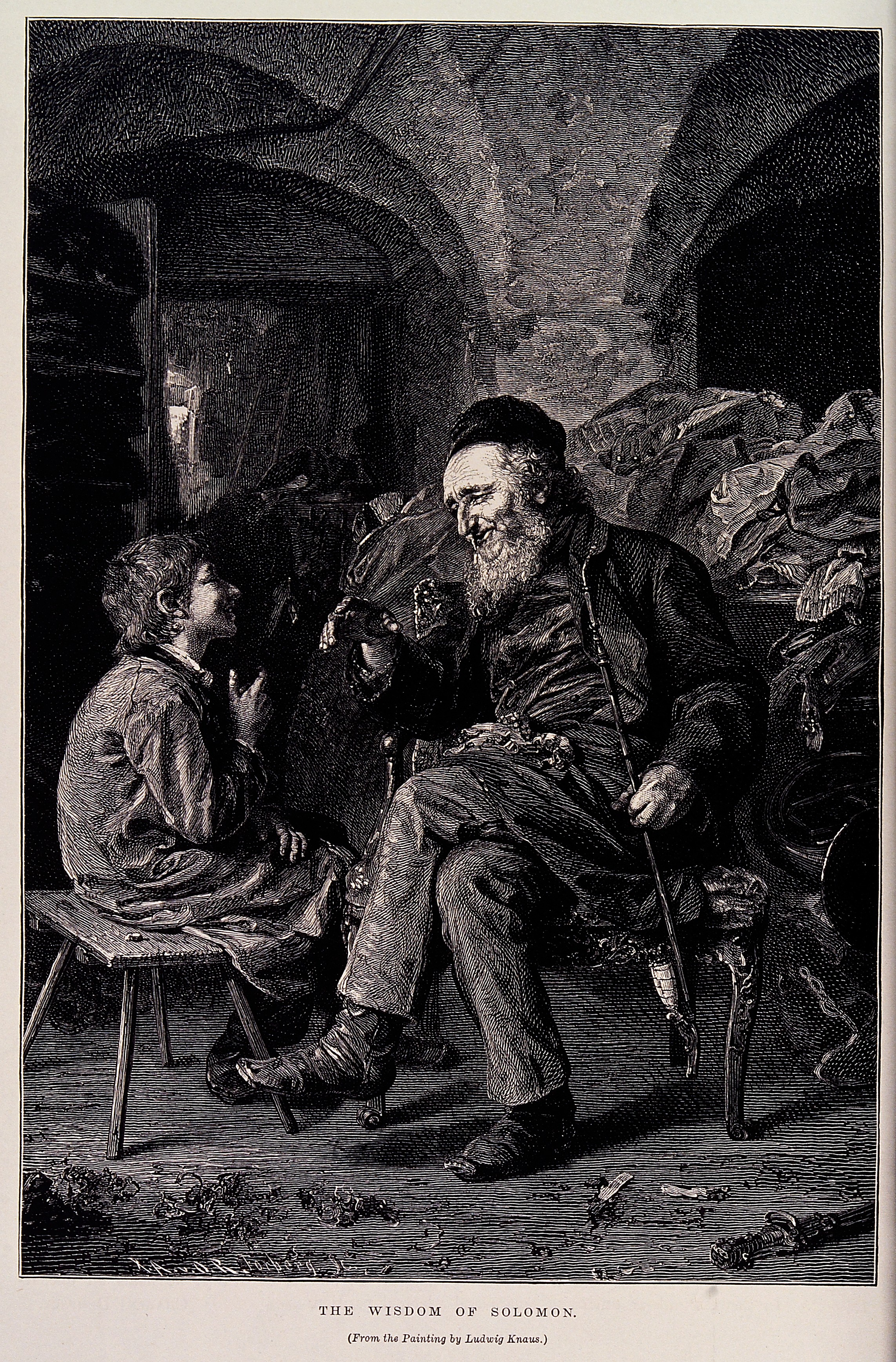
Salomonische Weisheit (after Ludwig Knaus)

- Der wunderbare Fischzug (after Raphael)
- Weide meine Schafe! (after Raphael)
- Himmelfahrt Mariä (after Peter Paul Rubens)
- Die fruchtlose Strafpredigt (after Benjamin Vautier)
- Die Weinprobe (after Eduard Kurzbauer)
- Das Vogelnest (after Julius Geertz)
- Die Wegführung der Juden in die Babylonische Gefangenschaft (after Eduard Bendemann)
- Jeremia beim Fall Jerusalems (after Eduard Bendemann)
- Jugendliebe (after Heinrich von Angeli)
- Konsultation beim Advokaten (after Wilhelm Sohn)
- Luthers Disputation mit Eck (after Carl Friedrich Lessing)
- Judenviertel in Amsterdam (after Andreas Achenbach)
- Der Große Kurfürst (after Wilhelm Camphausen)
- Friedrich der Große (after Wilhelm Camphausen)
- Im Park der Villa Borghese (after Oswald Achenbach)
- Kaiser Wilhelms letzte Heerschau (after Theodor Rocholl)
- Kaiser Wilhelms Ritt um Sedan (after Theodor Rocholl)
- Salomonische Weisheit (after Ludwig Knaus)
