= Jakob Fabricius =

Jakob Fabricius can refer to:

- Jakob Faber (theologian) (1537–1613), Lutheran theologian and leader of the Pomeranian Evangelical Church
- Jakob Fabricius (theologian) (1593–1654), Lutheran theologian and leader of the Pomeranian Evangelical Church
- Jacob Christian Fabricius (1840–1919), Danish composer and musician
