= Dantes Plads =

Public square in Copenhagen, Denmark

Coordinates: 55.6735°N 12.5735°E

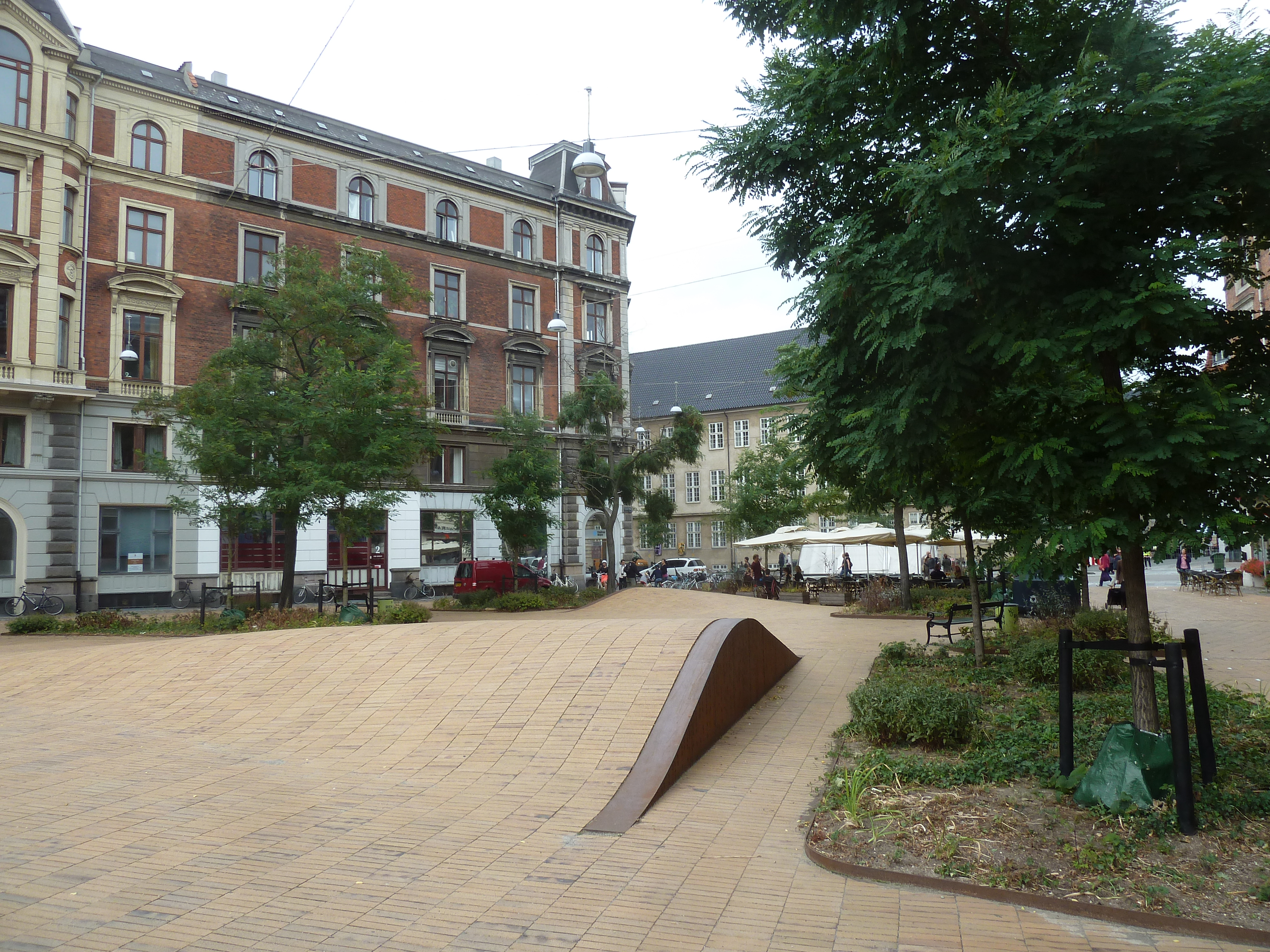
Dantes Plads

Dantes Plads (lit. "Dante's Square") is a public square located in front of the Ny Carlsberg Glyptotek where it connects H. C. Andersens Boulevard to Vester Voldgade in central Copenhagen, Denmark.

== History ==
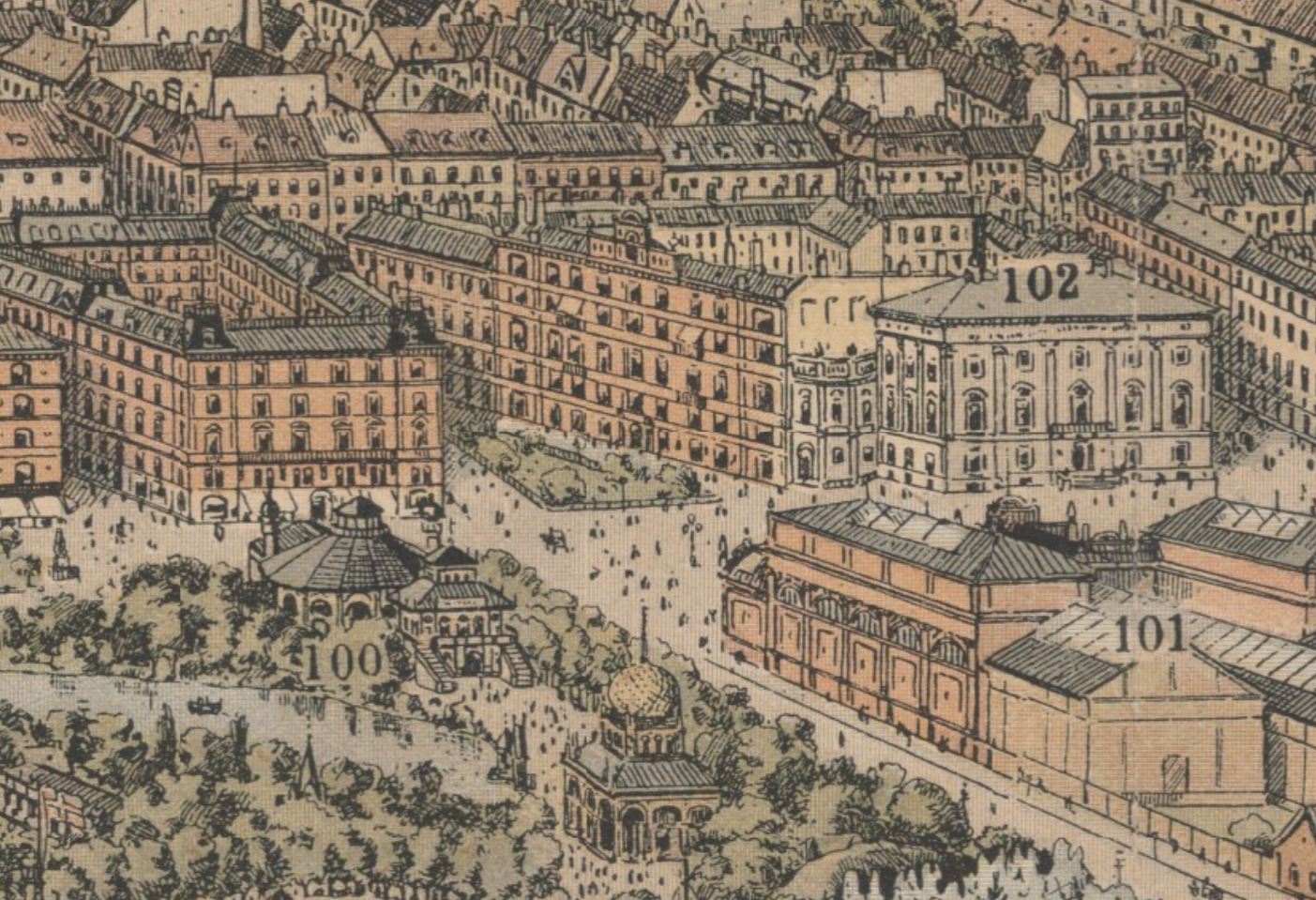
The later Dantes Plads is seen as an extension of Ny Vestergade on a detail of an 1897 drawing by Franz Sedivý

The shape of the square was created when the grounds of Copenhagen's former West Rampart were redeveloped in the 1880s but it was then simply part of an extension of Ny Vestergade. The trapezoidal shape enabled traffic to continue around the Ny Carlsberg Glyptotek along present-day Tietgensgade, then simply known as Ny Vestergades forlængelse" (Extension of Ny Vestergade). It was not until a narrow strip of Tivoli Gardens was acquired by the city and the Arena Theatre was demolished that Tietgensgade was connected to Stormgade one block further to the north.

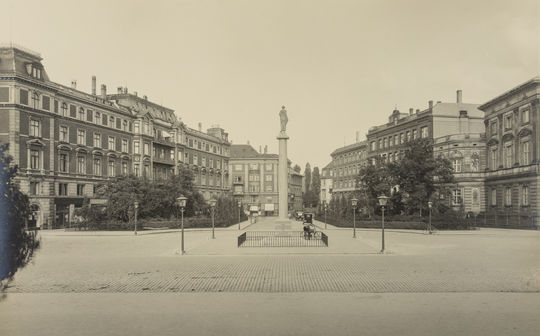
Dantes Plads in 1924

The name Dantes Plads was introduced in connection with the installation of the Dante Column in front of the Ny Carlsberg Glyptotek in 1924. The name originally referred to the section of Vestre Boulevard (now H. C. Andersens Boulevard) between Kongensgade and Stormgade. The boulevard was redesigned in 1955 in response to the increase in traffic that followed the inauguration of the new Lange Bridge. The whole street was at the same event renamed H. C. Andersens Boulevard to mark the 150th anniversary of Hans Christian Andersen's birth and the name Dantes Plads was instead transferred to the trapezoid space between the boulevard and Vester Voldgade, which had until then been part of Ny Vestergade.

== Current square ==
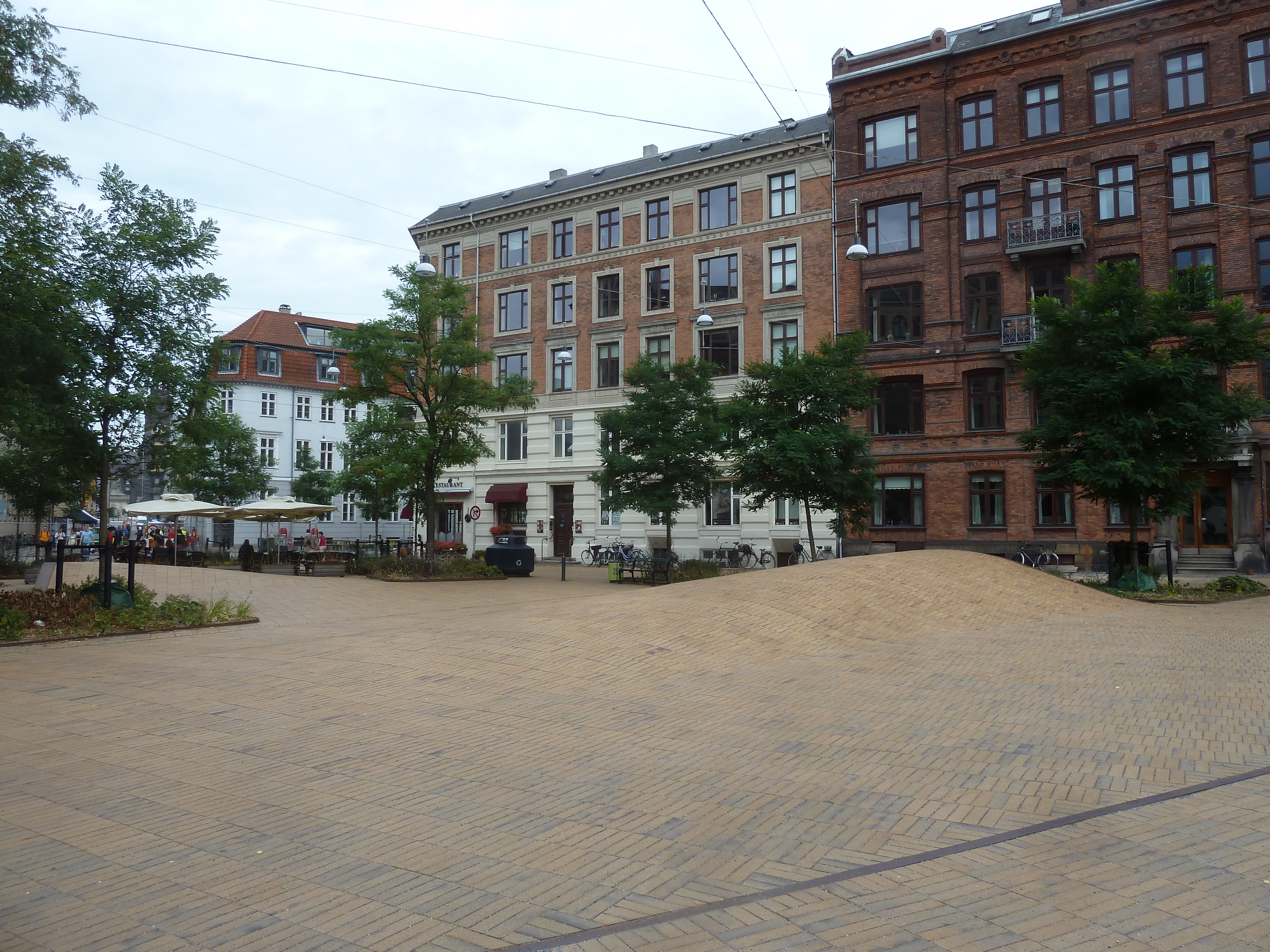
Dantes Plads south side

The square was redesigned by COBE and GHB Landskabsarkitekter in 2011. Its floor is paved with slender, yellow tiles and rises in four waves with perforated rusty red iron sides. The vegetation consists of Robinia trees and geometrically shaped flower beds.

== Dante Column ==
In 1921, it was decided to mark the 600th anniversary of Dante Alighieri's death with a monument in Copenhagen. A collection among Danish expats in Rome raised money for the monument which was designed by the sculptor Einar Utzon-Frank in collaboration with the architect Carl Brummer. It consists of a statue of Beatrice Portinari mounted on an antique statue which was a gift from the city of Rome. A relief on the plinth shows Dante's portrait.

== Notable buildings and residents ==
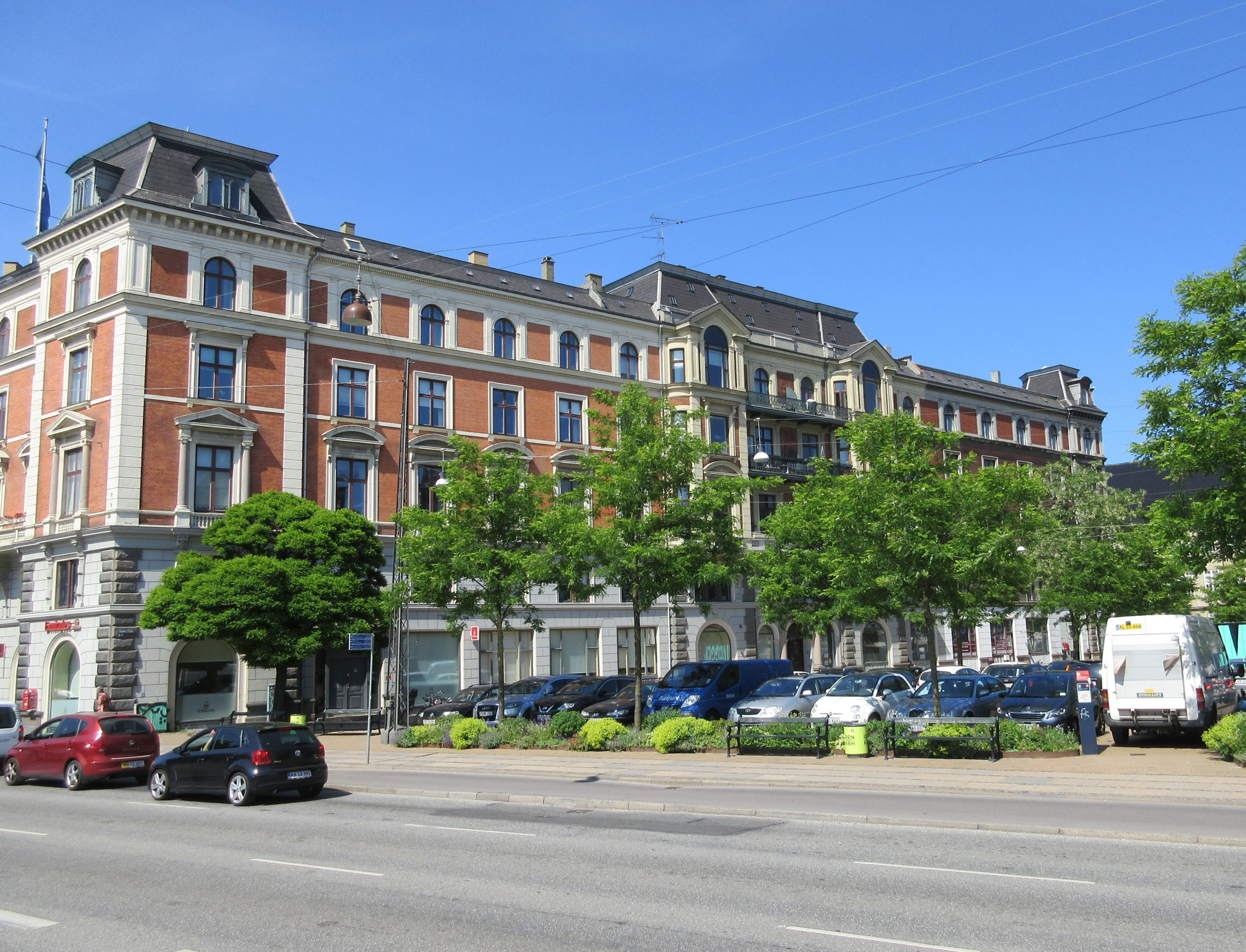
Holckenhus

The block on the north side of the square is known as Holckenhus after Holck's Bastion, which used to be located at the site. It was built in 1891-93 to a design by Philip Smidth which draws on inspiration from French Renaissance architecture. The two lower floors have granite rustication. The upper floors stand in blank red brick with decorations in painted cement.

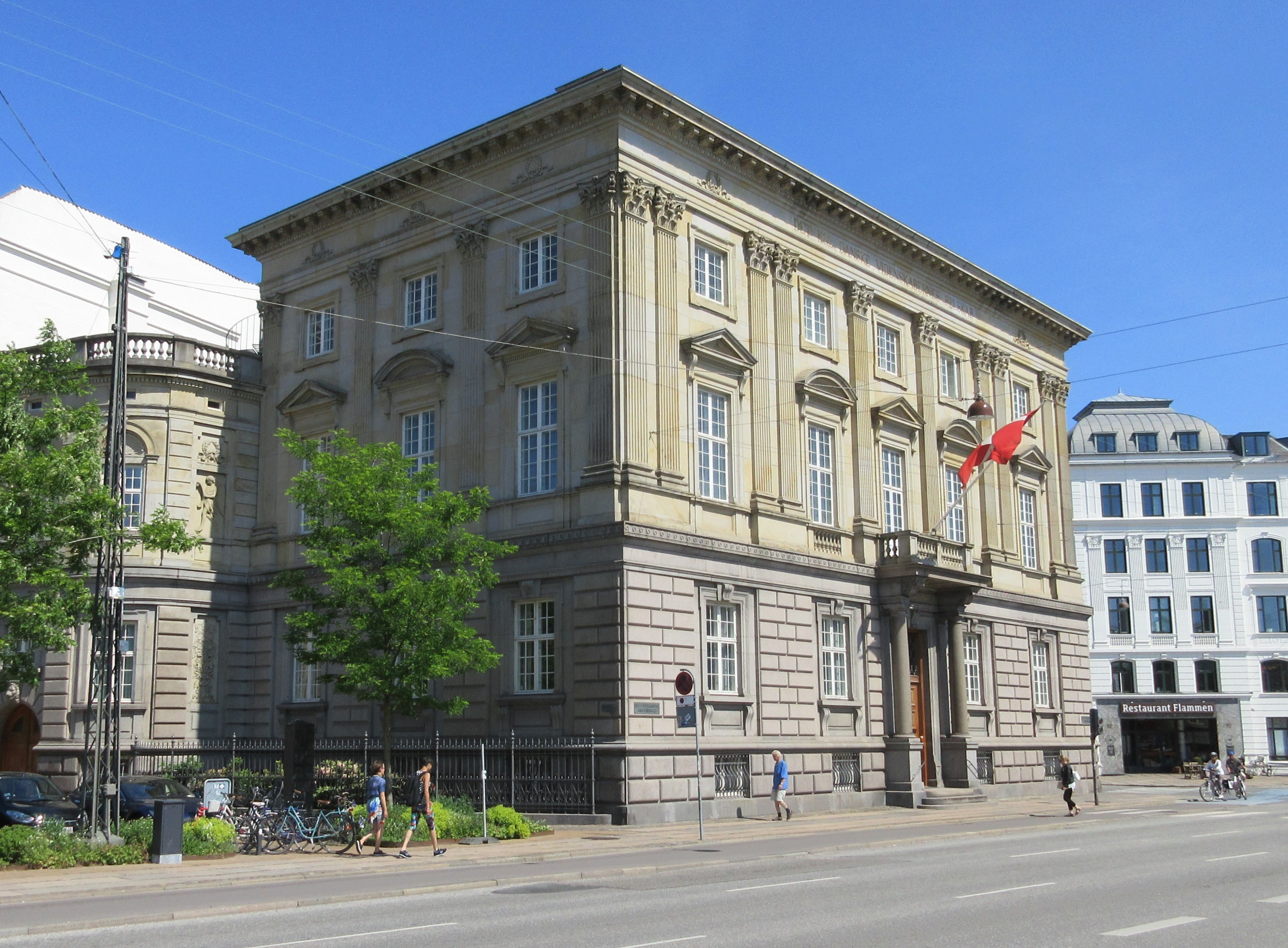
The building on H.C. Andersens Boulevard

On the south side of the square, with its façade facing H. C. Andersens Boulevard, is the shared home of the Royal Danish Academy of Sciences and Letters and the Carlsberg Foundation. It was built by Carl Jacobsen, who is commemorated by a memorial in polished granite next to the building. Its architect was Vilhelm Petersen.

The Ny Carlsberg Glyptotek still has its address on Dantes Plads 1.

== Public art ==
The Memorial to Danish Philologists was installed on the square in 1938. It was designed by William P. Larsen and Viggo Sten Møller.
