= Mauricio Kagel Music Prize =

The Mauricio Kagel Music Prize provided by the German arts foundation Kunststiftung NRW was established in 2011. The prize money is €50,000 (2026: €80,000). Of the prize money, €30,000 goes to the prizewinner and €20,000 has to be used for an art project in North Rhine-Westphalia. The biennially prize recognizes interdisciplinary work in the spirit of German-Argentinean composer Mauricio Kagel and artistic experiments where music, image and performance meet.

== Recipients ==
- 2011 Georges Aperghis
- 2013 Michel van der Aa
- 2015 Rebecca Saunders
- 2017 Simon Steen-Andersen
- 2024 Manos Tsangaris
- 2026 Liza Lim

== Jury ==
The jury in 2026:

- Ewa Bogusz-Moore
- Michael Jarrell
- Lydia Jeschke
- Sarah Nemtsov
