= Carl Krull =

Danish artist

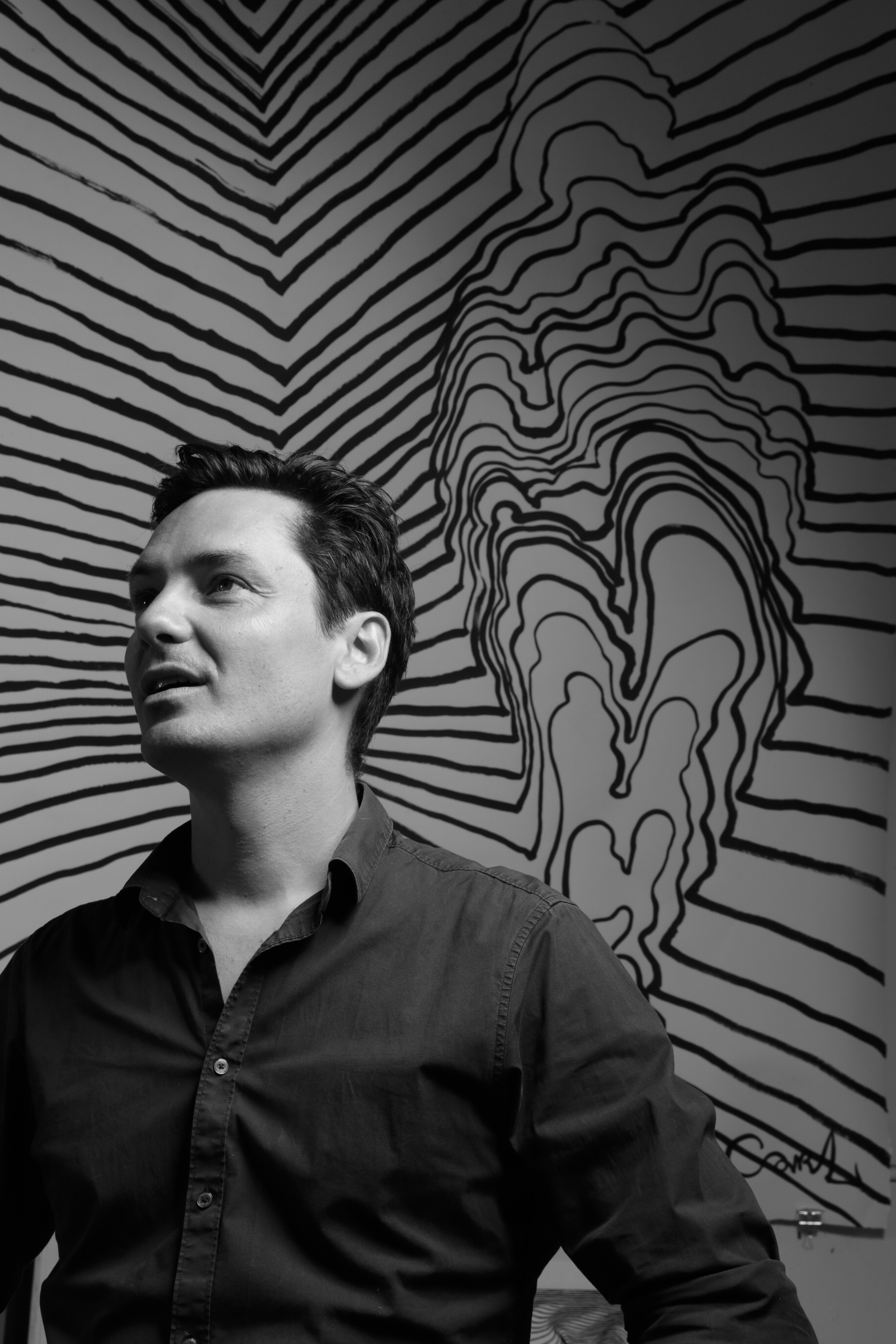
- Krull in 2017, with his art work Barrier 3 (brush and ink)
- Born: 1975 (age 50–51)
- Education: Master of Fine Arts
- Alma mater: Jan Matejko Academy of Fine Arts (Poland), San Carlos Academy of Fine Arts (Mexico)
- Known for: Seismographic Sculptural Drawing
- Website: carlkrull.dk

Carl Krull (born 1975) is a contemporary Danish artist. Best known for his "seismic" approach to sculptural drawing and painting, Krull works in various media, including sculptural drawing (paper and ink/pencil), sculpture, printmaking, virtual reality, and digital media.

An alumnus of the Jan Matejko Academy of Fine Arts (Poland) and San Carlos Academy of Fine Arts (Mexico), he completed a Master of Fine Arts degree in 1999. Krull has shown work in solo and group gallery exhibitions, including Snapshots From Slumberland – 3 X KRULL (ARoS Aarhus Kunstmuseum, Aarhus), Resonance (Hans Alf Gallery, Copenhagen), Seismic (V1 Gallery, Copenhagen), Copenhagen Creatives (Maison du Danemark, Paris), and Corpus Unika (Royal Danish Theatre, Copenhagen). He created commissioned sculptures for public installations at Silkeborg Bad sculpture park (Silkeborg) and Elsinore, murals, the design selected for the Carlsberg's 2018 Wiibroe Design, and was the inspiration for the Theatrical Organization of Cyprus theatre production In Two Minds. Until 2019, Krull's studio was at Holckenhus, in the historical corner pavilion loft unit where artists Emil Nolde and Agnes Slott-Møller lived and worked.

== Biography ==
Carl Krull was born on the island of Ærø (Denmark) in 1975, to artist parents Maria Struzik-Krull and Hans Oldau Krull. Krull studied at the Jan Matejko Academy of Fine Arts (Poland) and San Carlos Academy of Fine Arts, graduating with a Master of Fine Arts degree in 1999. He was selected as a 2007 Artist-in-residence at Art Studio Itsukaichi (Japan).

== Career ==
Carl Krull's artistic style has been described as "seismic" or "seismographic", referring to the sculptural drawing and painting approach that he developed. The approach is characterized by a topographical way of perceiving figures and space; rather than using contours to outline his subjects, Krull employs an abundance of lines to create the effect of the subject protruding from the two-dimensional surface of the paper or screen. Krull developed the method during a road trip through the United States, drawing continuous lines on a paper tube while acting as a human seismograph, allowing bumps in the road to create irregularities in the contoured lines he was drawing. Through experimentation, he evolved the method from black and white car scrolls to color, and incorporated diverse methods that include photography, drawing, painting, printmaking, large scale sculptures, and murals.

=== Public installations ===
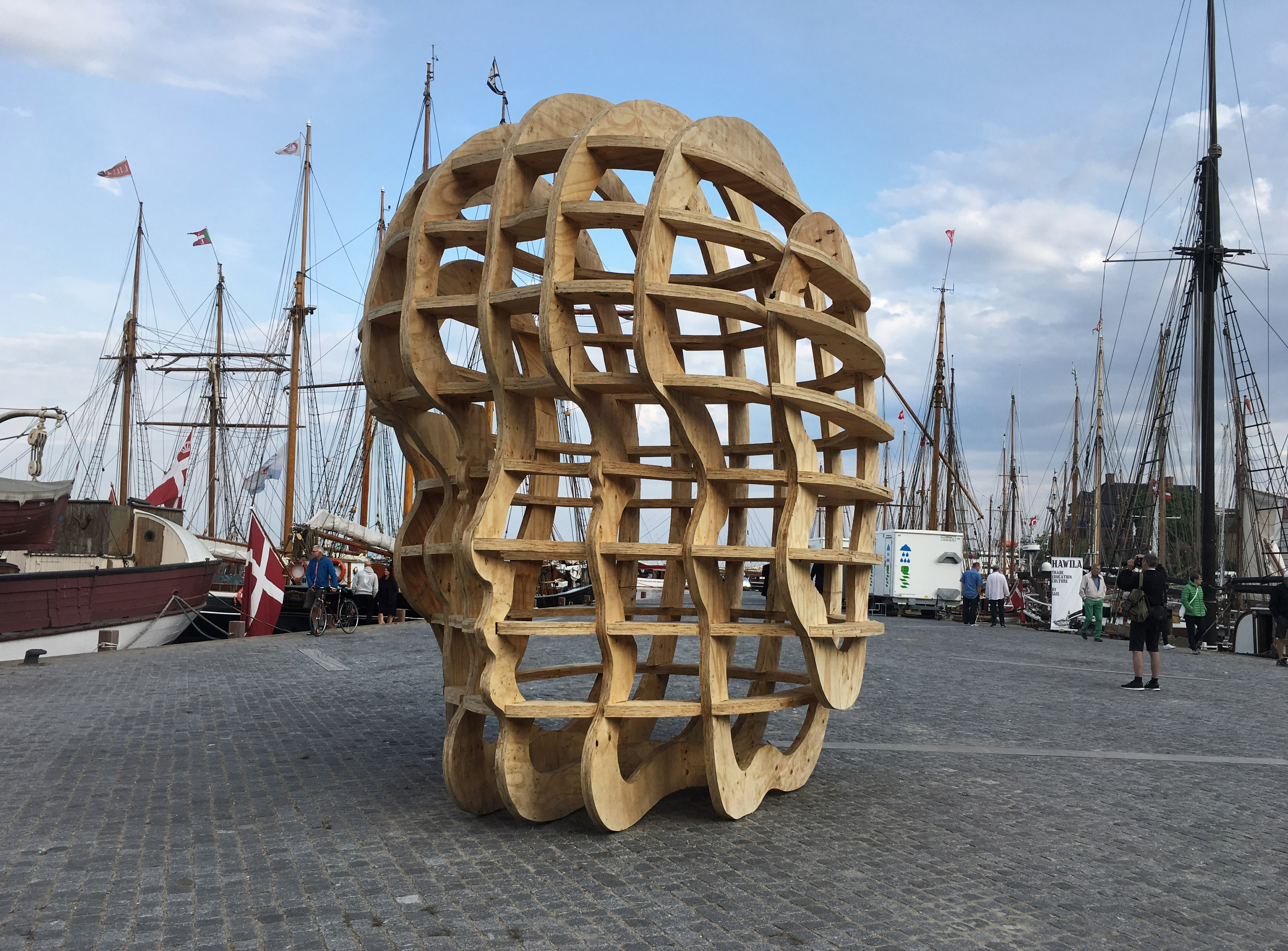
"Celestial", a 4 metres (13 ft) high, 1 ton plywood sculpture created by Carl Krull and installed at Elsinore Harbor (Denmark, 2018)
- Celestial – 2018, Elsinore harbor. A 4 metres (13 ft) tall sculpture of a head, crafted from CNC-cut plywood board.
- Subterranean – 2017, Silkeborg Bad sculpture park. An 2.4 metres (7.9 ft) tall concrete sculpture created by excavating earth in the form of two concave figures, then filling the negative forms with 29 tons of concrete. The resulting sculptures were lifted from the earthen mold to create a single convex figure.
- Loloopop – 2006. An audio-visual installation created in collaboration with Simon Steen-Andersen.

=== Public collections ===
- Slitscanner (pencil), acquired 2011, ARoS Aarhus Kunstmuseum
- Slitscanner (digital media), acquired 2011, ARoS Aarhus Kunstmuseum
- Graphite #5 (pencil on paper), acquired 2016, Colección SOLO (Madrid, Spain)
- Olmec #2 (pencil on paper), acquired 2016, Colección SOLO (Madrid, Spain)
- Olmec #4 (pencil on paper), acquired 2016, Colección SOLO (Madrid, Spain)
- Olmec #5 (pencil on paper), acquired 2016, Colección SOLO (Madrid, Spain)

=== Selected exhibitions ===
- Resonance, Hans Alf Gallery (solo) (Copenhagen, Denmark) – 2018
- Copenhagen Creatives (participating artist), Maison du Danemark (Paris, France) – 2018
- Wunderkammer 1 – liquid form (participating artist), Esbjerg Art Museum (Jutland, Denmark) – 2018
- Seismic, V1 Gallery (Copenhagen, Denmark) – 2014
- Snapshots from Slumberland – 3 x Krulls, ARoS Aarhus Kunstmuseum (Aarhus, Denmark) – 2011
- Telescope, V1 Gallery (Copenhagen, Denmark) – 2010
- Palace Party (participating artist), Kunsthal Charlottenborg (Copenhagen, Denmark) – 2011

=== Performing arts ===
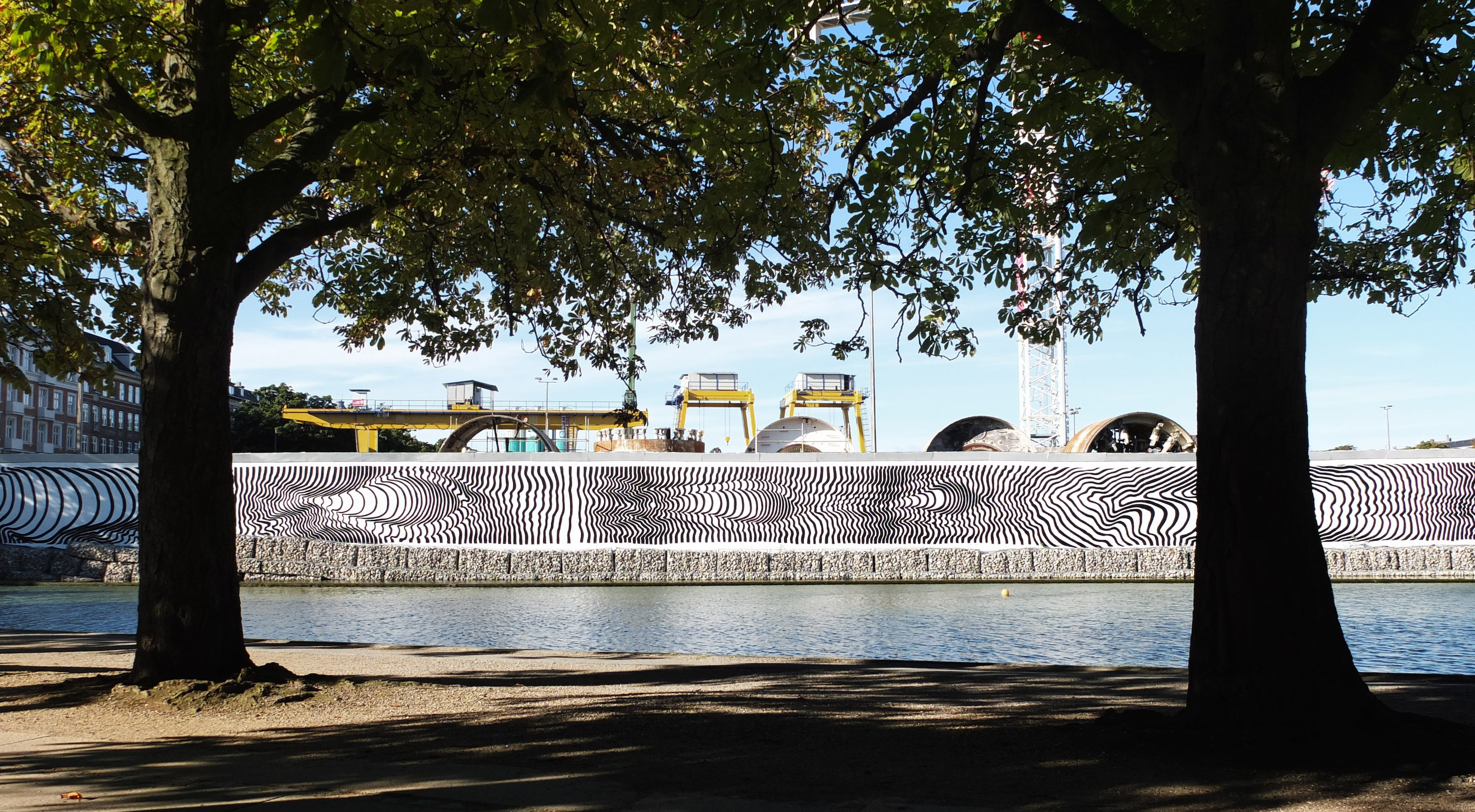
Seismic Wave, a 100 meter mural by Carl Krull. Copenhagen, 2015

Krull performed live in the production Body and Soul (Royal Danish Theatre, 2015–2016 season), creating a piece of virtual reality art during this theatre tribute to the human body. During the exhibition Palace Party at Kunsthal Charlottenborg, Krull performed a live, artistic marathon in front of the audience, creating a large-scale drawing over the course of 10 hours. His work served as the inspiration for the 2010 Theatrical Organization of Cyprus theatre production In Two Minds.

=== Awards ===
- "Selected Artist" invited to create the 2018 Carlsberg Wiibroe Design (graphic design)
- Seismic Wave (outdoor installation) – Finalist, Hegnspælen 2015
- Angels and Demons – Diesel New Art Prize 2005
