= Holckenhus =

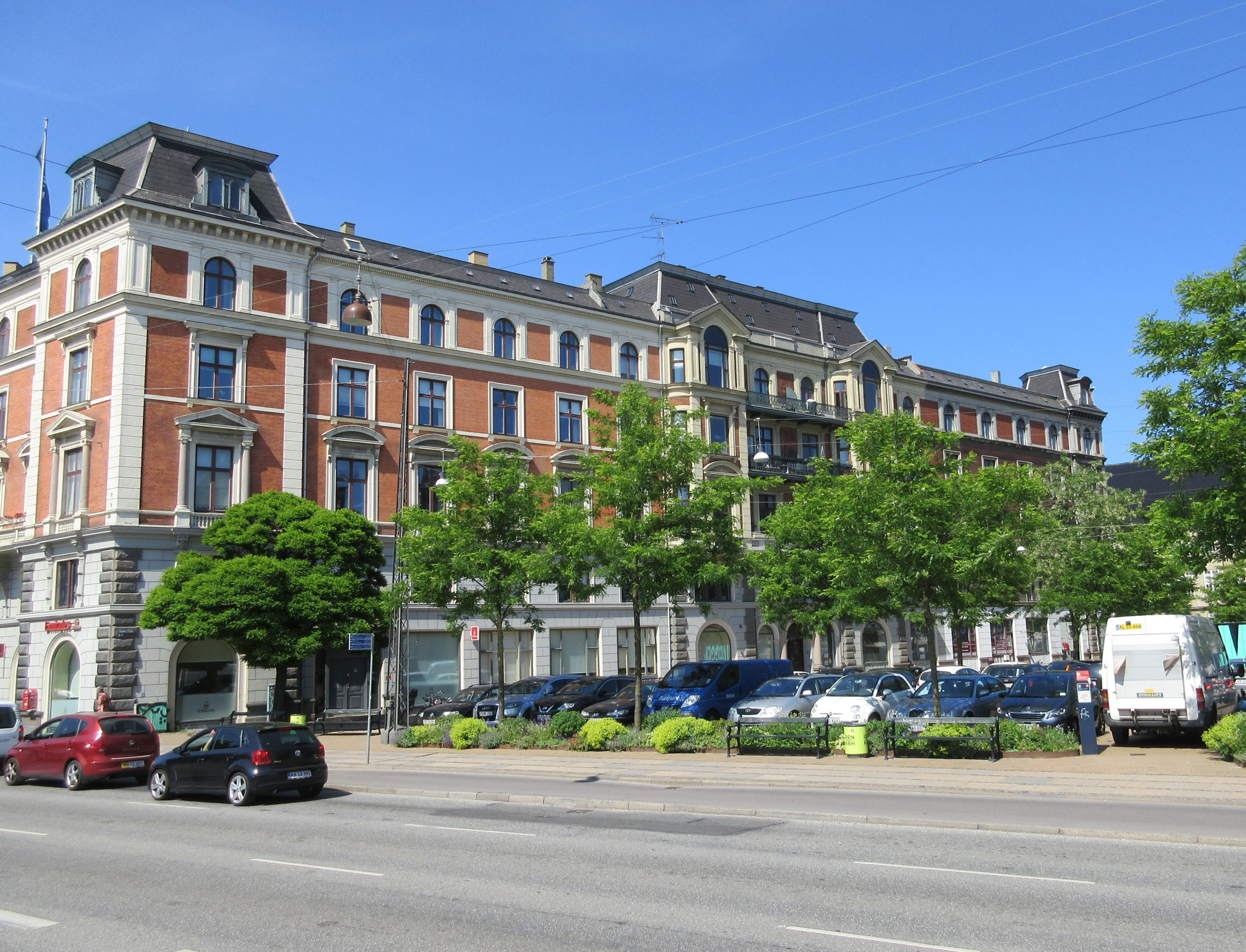
- Holckenhus with Dantes Plads in the foreground
- Interactive map of the Holckenhus area

General information
- Architectural style: French Renaissance Revival
- Location: Copenhagen, Denmark
- Coordinates: 55.6739°N 12.5731°E
- Construction started: 1891
- Completed: 1893
- Owner: Blackrock Group

Design and construction
- Architect: Philip Smidth

Holckenhus is a late 19th-century, residential perimeter block located between Dantes Plads (Nos. 2–6), H. C. Andersens Boulevard (No. 33), Vester Voldgade (Nos. 86–90) and Stormgade (No. 35) in central Copenhagen, Denmark. The lofts of the four corner pavilions contained studio space and dwellings for artists. Some of the fourth-floor apartments were also designed with small artist stidops. Artists who have lived and worked in the building include Peder Severin Krøyer, Emil Nolde and Bertha Wegmann.

== History ==
Holckenhus is located in the grounds of Copenhagen's former West Rampart and takes its name from Holck's Bastion, which used to be located at the site.

The building was constructed by master mason Albert Nicolai Schioldann in 1891–93. It was designed by Philip Smidth. The first part of the brick work (basement) was executed by master mason Carl Møller. In January 1892, Schioldamm signed a contract with C. Licht for the rest of the brick work. It was already completed in May.

Back in 1885, Schioldann had also constructed the building at Gammel Kongevej 135–138 in Frederiksberg. This building was also constructed with studio space for artists on the top floor.

Schioldann lived in the first-floor apartment at Vester Voulevard 4 (now H. C. Andersens Boulevard. Some time between 1895 and 1901, Holckenhus was sold to the Det Kjøbenhavnske Ejendoms Societet.

In 1923, Prince Viggo rented one of the third-floor apartments at Vester Voldgade 90. After his wedding the following year, he was joined there bys wife Eleanor Margaret. In 1931, they moved to Store Mariendal north of the city.

== Architecture ==
Holckenhus fills the complete city block between Vester Voldgade, Stormgade, HC Andersens Boulevard; and Dantes Plads. The front on HC Andersens Boulevard is much shorter than the one on Vestervoldgade, resulting in a perimeter block in the shape of a distinct two short secondary wings project from the yard-side of each of the three longest wings.

The building was designed with inspiration from French Renaissance architecture. The two lower floors have granite rustication. The upper floors stand in blank red brick with decorations in painted cement. French Renaissance architecture was also a source of inspiration for other prominent development projects in Copenhagen, such as Søtorvet and Magasin du Nord.

== Artist's studios ==
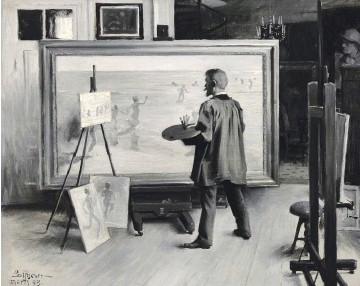
P. S. Krøyer in his Holckenhus studio, 1899

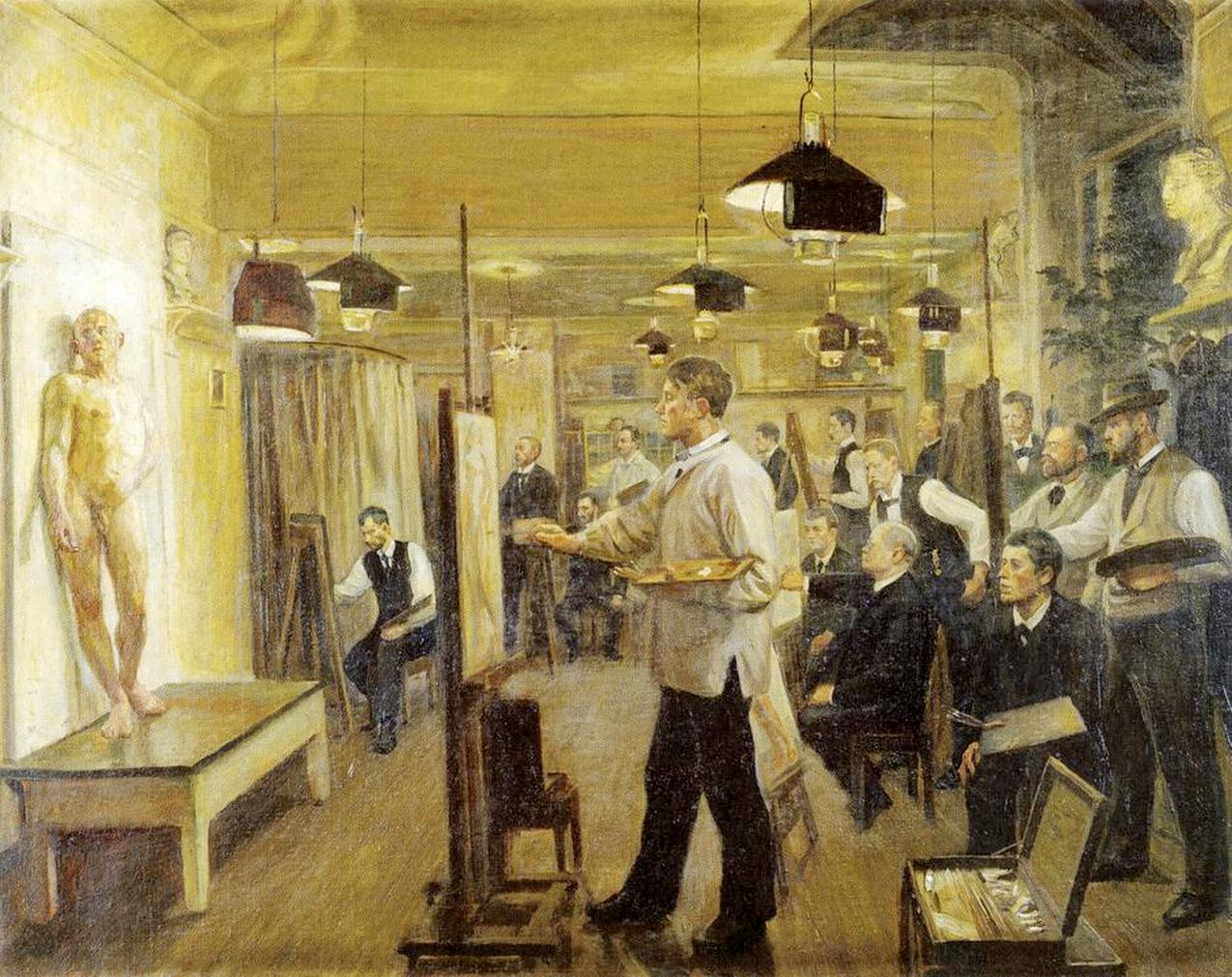
Poul C. Christensen: Zahrtmann's Painting School, 1899

The lofts of the four corner pavilions contain studio facilities and dwellings for artists. A number of prominent artists have lived and worked in the building. Peder Severin Krøyer and Marie Krøyer had their winter home in the building from its completion in 1892 but continued to spend the summers at Skagen. Emil Nolde lived in the building during his stay in Copenhagen in 1900–01. Bertha Wegmann and Agnes and Harald Slott-Møller have also lived and worked in the building.

Kristian Zahrtmann operated a painting school from the premises in the early 1900s. It has previously been based in Prior's Atelier Building at Vredgade 33.

More recent residents include Jens Birkemose, Maria Wandel, Carl Krull, Peter Bonén and Jesper Langberg.
