= Bertha Wegmann =

Danish portrait painter (1847–1926)

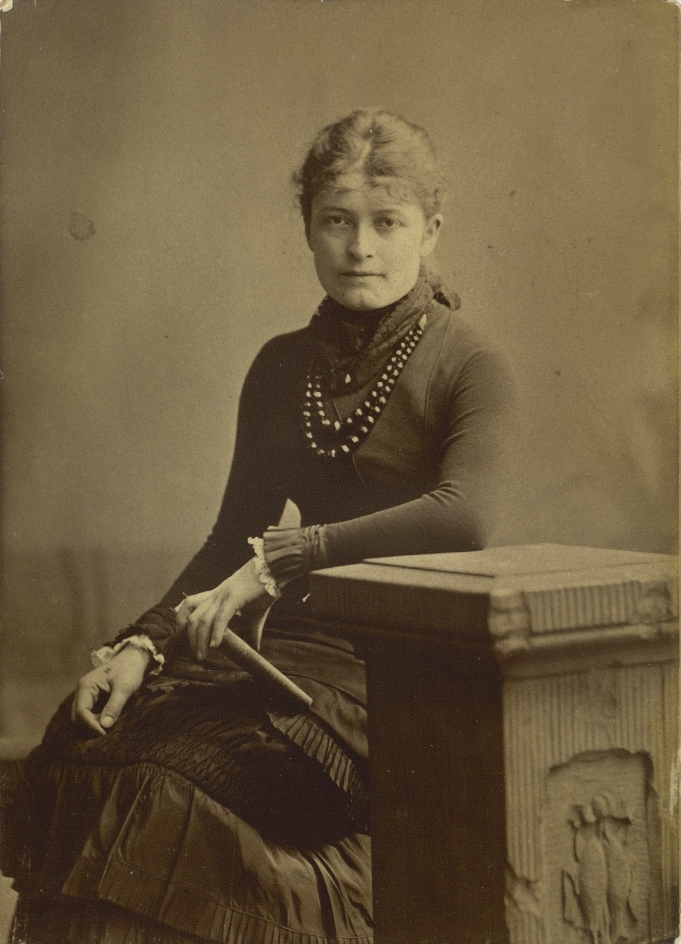
- Bertha Wegmann (photograph by Georg Emil Hansen, 1891)
- Born: 16 December 1847; Soglio, Switzerland
- Died: 22 February 1926 (aged 79); Copenhagen
- Education: Frederik Ferdinand Helsted, Heinrich Buntzen and Frederik Christian Lund
- Awards: Thorvaldsen Medal; Ingenio et Arti medal

Bertha Wegmann (1847–1926) was a Danish portrait painter of Swiss ancestry. She was the first woman to hold a chair at the Royal Danish Academy of Fine Arts.

== Life ==
When Bertha Wegmann was five years old, her family moved to Copenhagen, where her father became a merchant. He was an art lover and spent much of his spare time painting. She showed an interest in drawing at an early age, but received no formal education until she was nineteen, when she began taking lessons from Frederik Ferdinand Helsted, Heinrich Buntzen and Frederik Christian Lund.

Two years later, with the support of her parents, Wegmann moved to Munich and lived there until 1881. At first, she studied with the historical painter Wilhelm von Lindenschmit the Younger, later with the genre painter Eduard Kurzbauer, but she was not satisfied with learning in a studio atmosphere and decided to study directly from nature.

She made friends with the Swedish painter, Jeanna Bauck, and took several study trips to Italy with her. In 1881, they moved to Paris where Wegmann exhibited at several salons and received an "honorable mention".

The next year, she returned to Copenhagen, where she was already well-known from works she had been exhibiting at the Charlottenborg Palace since 1873. A portrait of her sister was awarded the Thorvaldsen Medal in 1883.

Four years later, Wegmann became the first woman to hold a chair at the Royal Danish Academy. From that year through 1907, she was a member of the board for the "Tegne- og Kunstindustriskolen for Kvinder" (Drawing and Art Industrial School for Women).

She continued to exhibit widely and represented Denmark at several world's fairs, including the World's Columbian Exhibition in Chicago.

Wegmann died suddenly while at work in her studio.

== Selected paintings ==
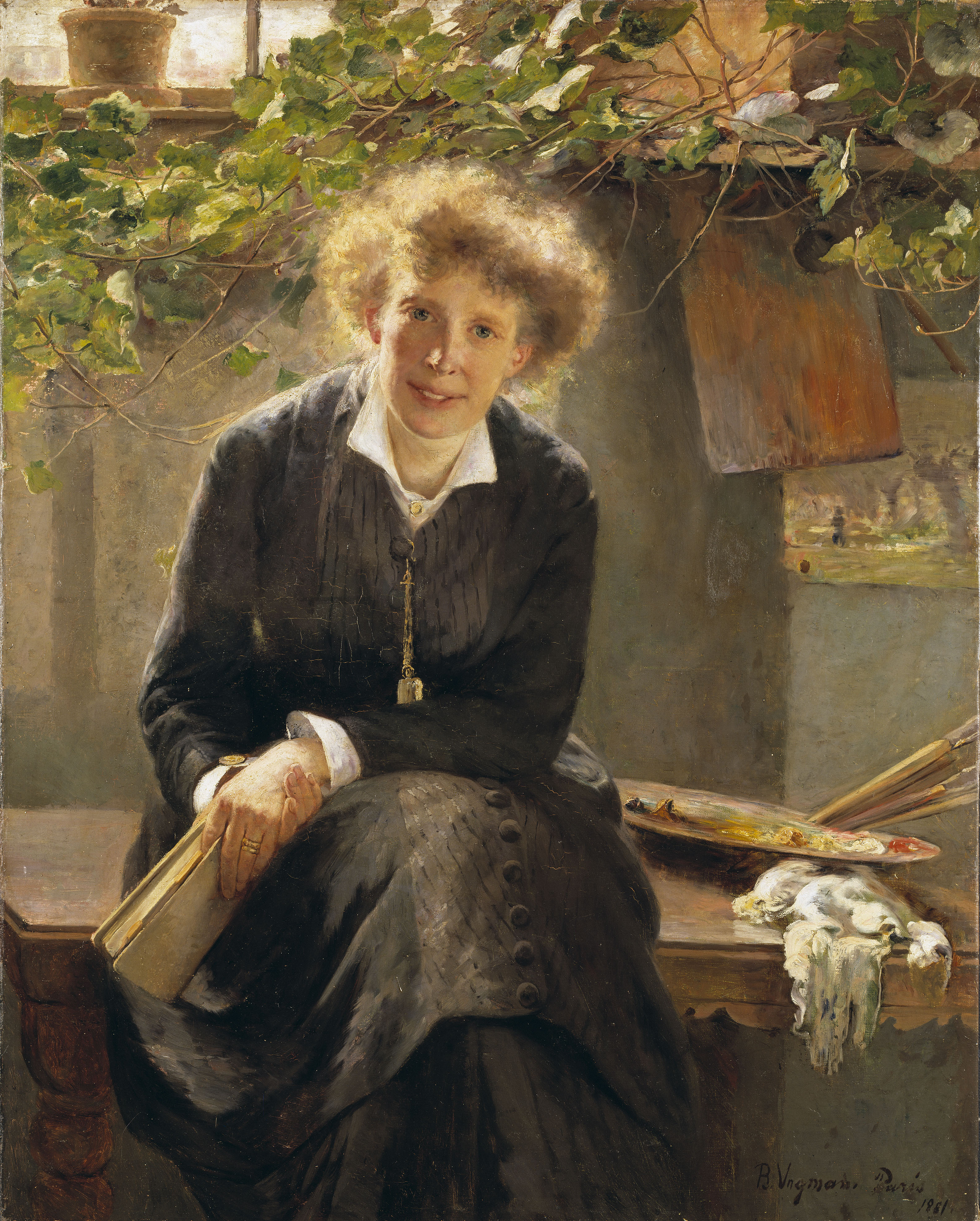
Portrait of Jeanna Bauck (1881)

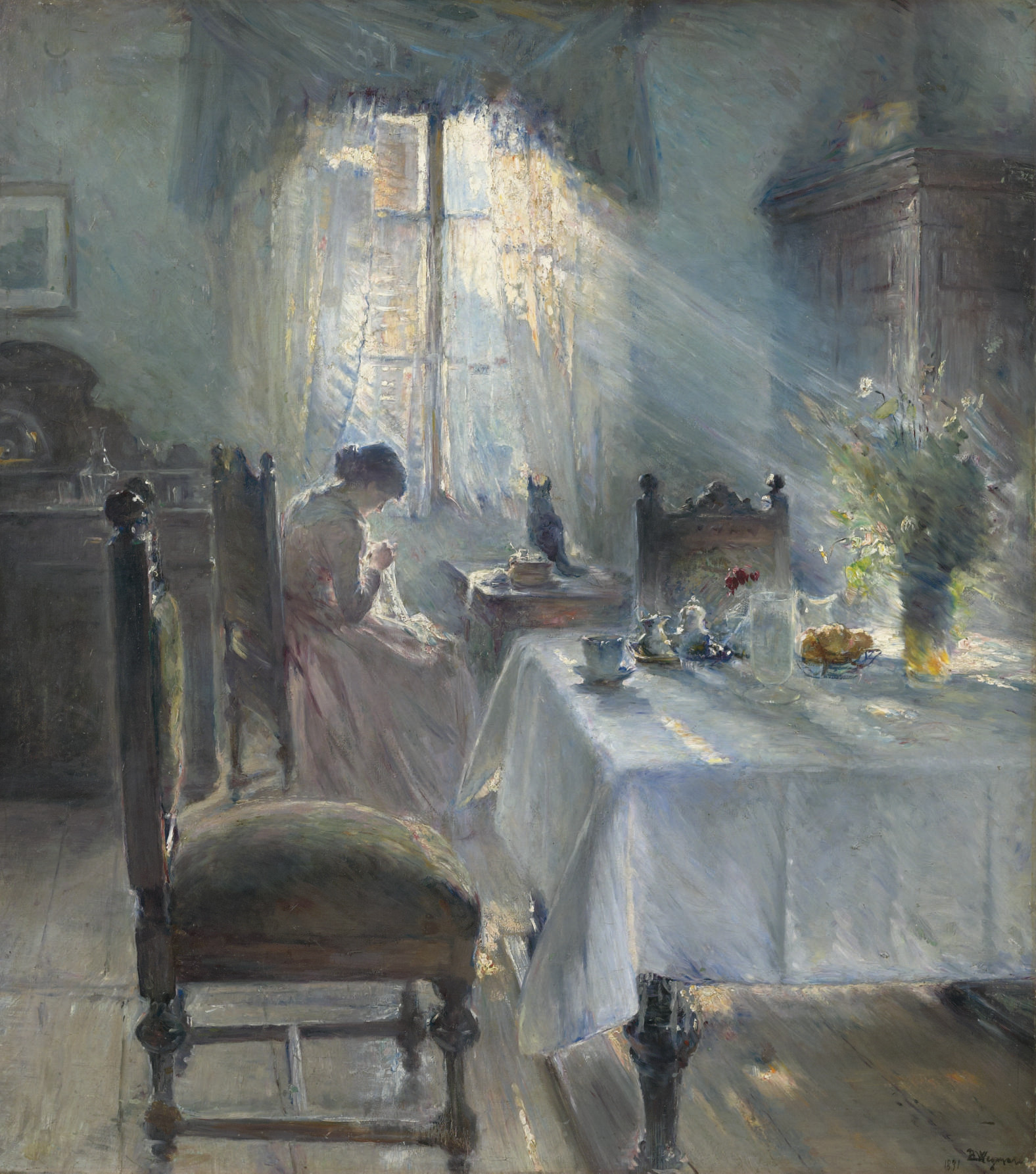
A Woman Sewing

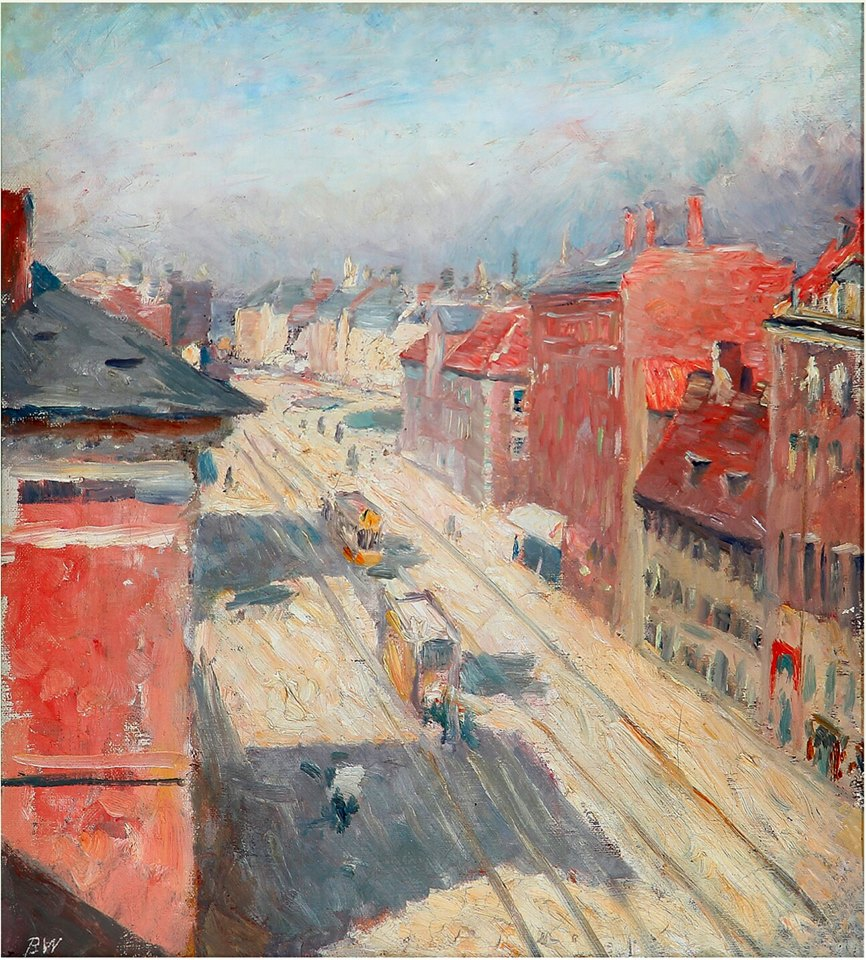
View from the Holckenhus

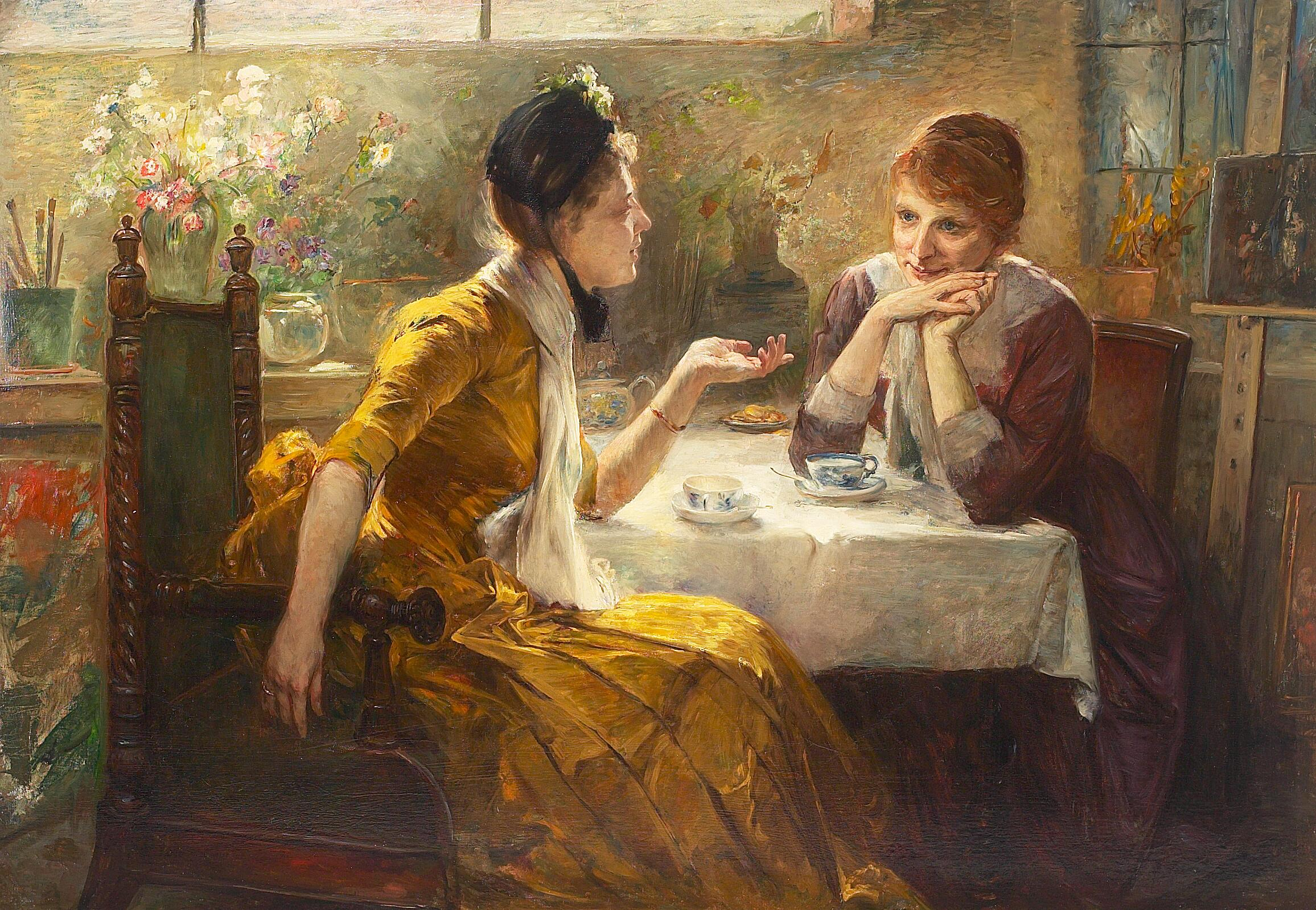
Two Friends Drinking Tea
in the Artist's Studio

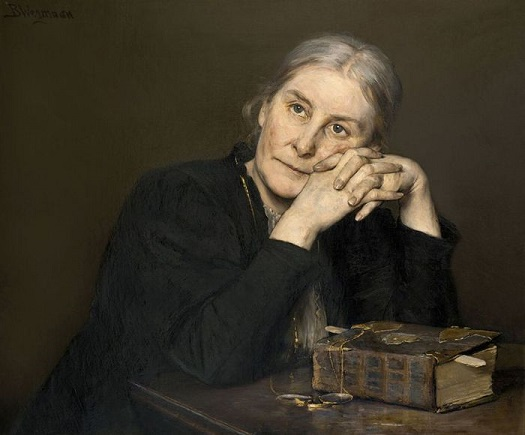
Pondering the Scriptures

== See also ==
- Bertha Wegmann Painting a Portrait
