= Bertha Wegmann Painting a Portrait =

19th century painting by Jeanna Bauck

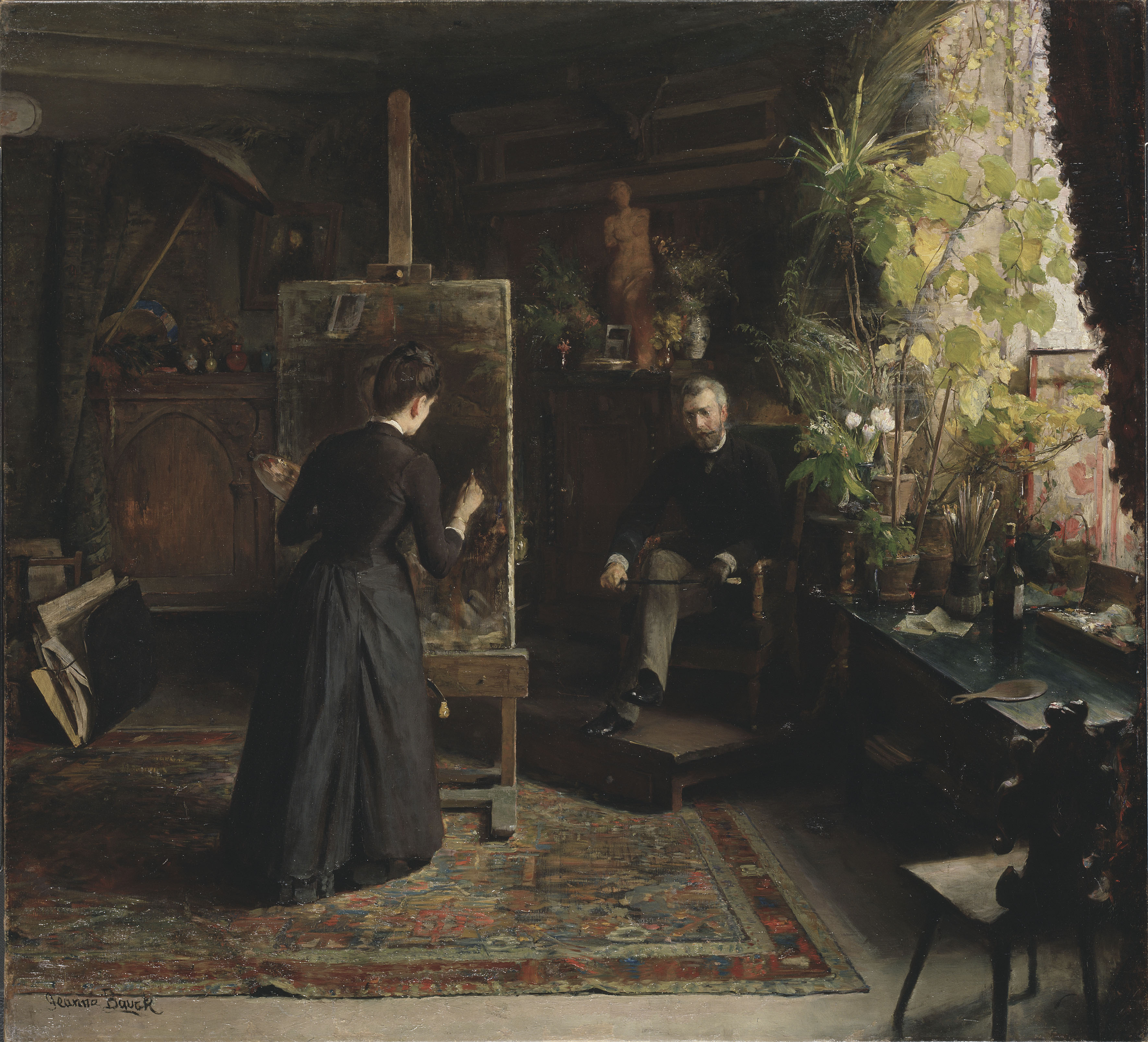
The painting depicts an unknown man sitting for a portrait

Bertha Wegmann Painting a Portrait is a 19th-century painting by Jeanna Bauck, from the late 1870s, showing Bertha Wegmann at work in their joint studio in Munich. It was acquired by the Nationalmuseum, in Stockholm, in 1930 from Ms. Toni Agnes Möller-Wegmann as a gift. The two artists also lived in the studio depicted in the painting. Painted using oil on canvas, the painting measures 100 by 110 centimetres (39 by 43 in).

It is part of a series created by the two women which depicted one another, helping to break the norm of painters as male.

In 1880, Jeanna Bauck traveled to Paris, along with Bertha Wegmann, with whom she shared an art-studio. Bauck was admitted to the Paris Salon the same year. In a number of portraits of each other, Bauck and Wegman contributed to changing the view of women artists and broke the male-dominated norms of the artistic community. After a few years in Paris, Jeanna Bauck returned to Munich and started a school for women painters.

In the 1800s, a line was often drawn between the private and public life, with public life considered a male domain, while female activity was reserved for private life. The female world was perceived as static and unchanging, in comparison with male-dominated modern life, which happens in public. The traditional image of a woman was considered unchangeable, like nature. At this time, women who lived in the bigger cities were restricted from public life.

Nordic female artists often painted themselves or others within their studios. In their portraits, the art studio symbolizes the never-ending opportunities of the art studio, but also the clear border created by the studio. In contrast, they often chose not to depict the world outside.

== Books ==
- Gynning, Margareta (1999). Det ambivalenta perspektivet: Eva Bonnier och Hanna Hirsch-Pauli i 1880-talets konstliv (avhandling). Stockholm: Bonnier. Libris 8345213. ISBN 91-0-056898-8
- Gynning, Margareta, red (2006). Konstnärspar: kring sekelskiftet 1900. Nationalmusei utställningskatalog. Stockholm: Nationalmuseum. Libris 10100457. ISBN 91-7100-742-3
- Svanholm, Lise. Bertha Wegmann. De drogo till Paris. Nordiska konstnärinnor på 1880-talet. Utställningskatalog Liljevalchs. Stockholm 1988.
