= Jeanna Bauck =

Swedish artist (1840–1926)

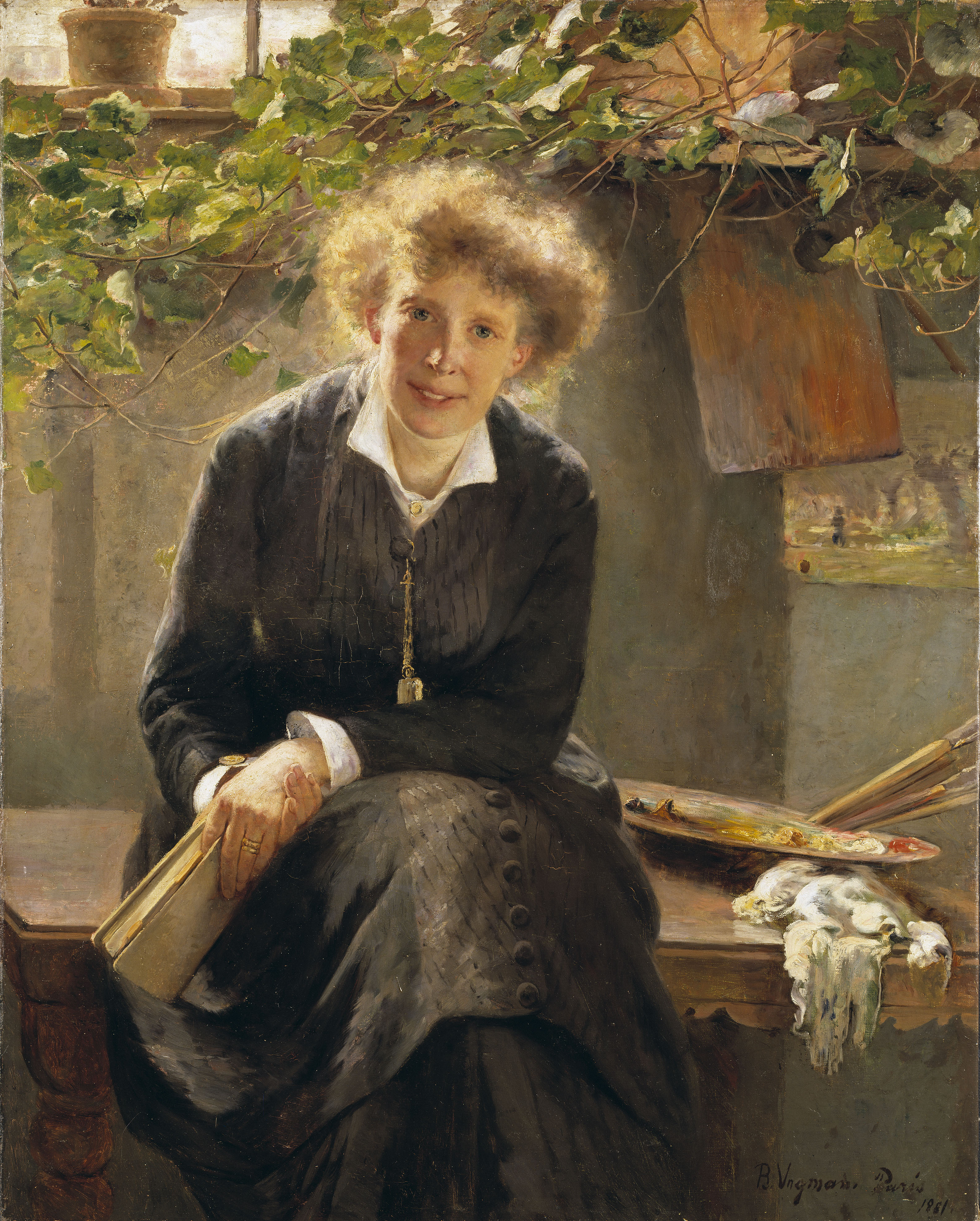
- Portrait by her friend Bertha Wegmann
- Born: 19 August 1840; Stockholm, Sweden-Norway
- Died: 27 May 1926 (aged 85); Munich, Bavaria, Weimar Republic
- Known for: Painting

Jeanna Bauck (19 August 1840 – 27 May 1926) was a Swedish-German painter known for her landscape and portrait paintings, and her career as an educator, as well as her friendships with Bertha Wegmann and Paula Modersohn-Becker.

== Early life ==
Jeanna Bauck was born in 1840. She was the daughter of a German-born composer and music critic Carl Wilhelm Bauck (1808–1877) and a Swedish mother, Dorothea Fredrique (1806–1834). She had a sister, Hanna Lucia Bauck, and two older brothers, Emanuel Bauck, and Johannes Bauck. Jeanna was raised in Stockholm. She remained in Sweden until 1863, at which time she moved to Germany to study painting, first in Dresden and then in Munich where she met the Danish portrait painter Bertha Wegmann. The two became life-long friends, living together, sharing a studio, and travelling to Italy and Paris, where they lived a number of years before returning to Munich.

== Early career ==
Her art education began under Adolf Ehrhardt in Dresden, then under Albert Flamm in Düsseldorf, then Joseph Brandt in Munich. The majority of her landscape training was in Munich as well, under the tutelage of Academy-trained painter Johann Diedrich Christian Langko, who was notably inspired throughout his career by the Barbizon school of painting. Most of the paintings produced throughout Bauck’s career, like those of her teacher, are classified within the Barbizon style.

Bauck began her career painting almost exclusively landscapes, and found moderate success doing so. She later expanded into portrait painting, and by the late 1890s was producing equal amounts of both. During the course of her career she won awards at exhibitions both within Germany and abroad, and was at various times represented by galleries in Stockholm and Trieste.

== Later life ==
In 1880, Bauck moved to Paris and shared a studio with her friend Bertha Wegmann. During this time Bauck painted a portrait of Wegmann titled The Danish Artist Bertha Wegmann Painting a Portrait, and Wegmann painted, among some twenty other portraits, her well-known portrait of Bauck, Målarinnan Jeanna Bauck. Also during their time in Paris, both Bauck and Wegmann showed works in the Paris Salons of 1881 and 1882.

She showed works at the 1893 Chicago World's Fair and her paintings Woodland Lake and Portrait of a man were included in the 1905 book Women Painters of the World.

By 1897, Bauck was living in Berlin and teaching painting night classes at the Association of Berlin Arts. It is here that she met and later befriended a student, then twenty-one year old Paula Modersohn-Becker, who would later describe Bauck as having been her favorite teacher. Becker would go on to become a highly influential early-expressionist painter.

In 1926 Jeanna Bauck died in Munich, Germany, at age 85.

== Selected works ==
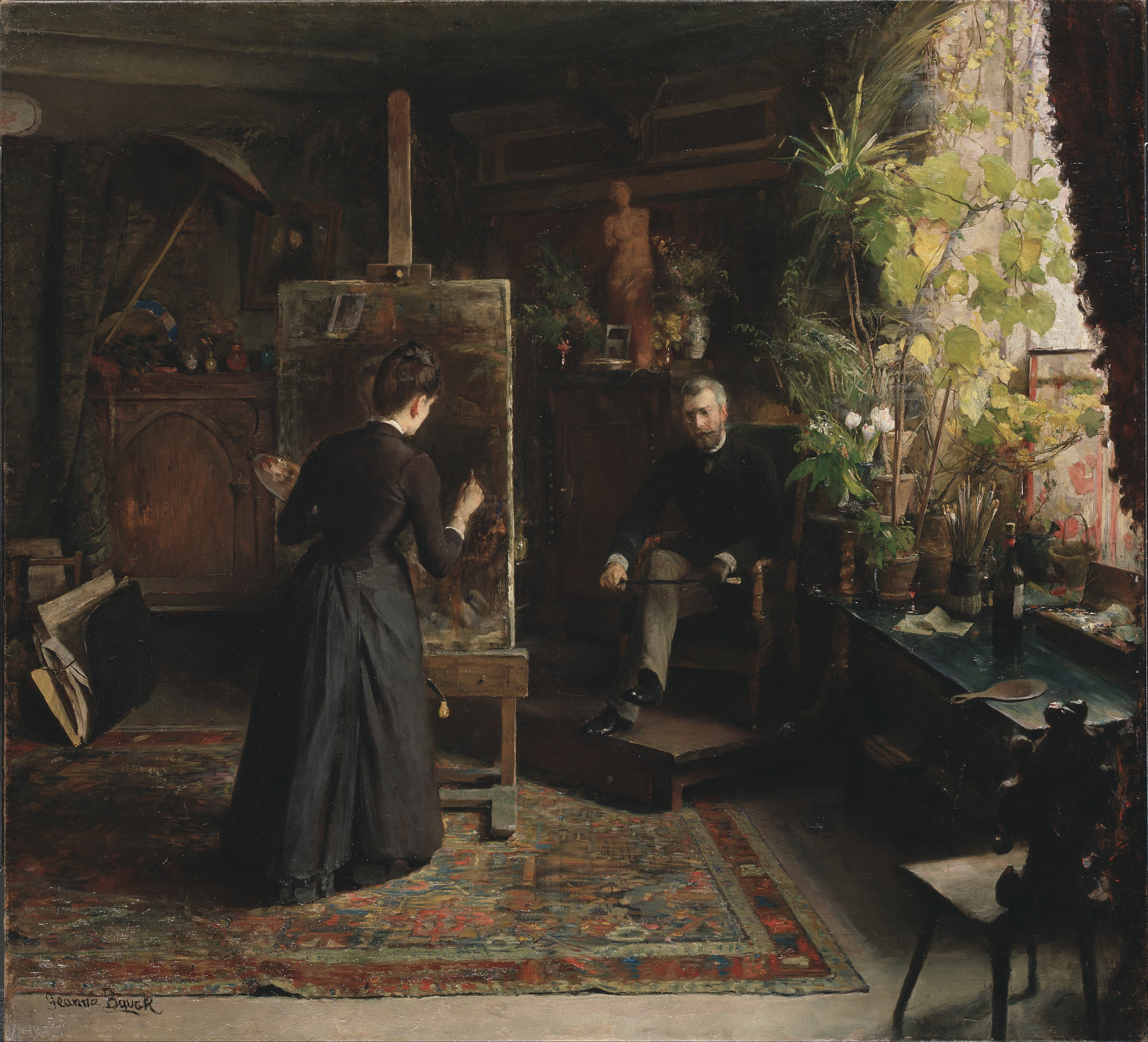
Bertha Wegmann Painting a Portrait

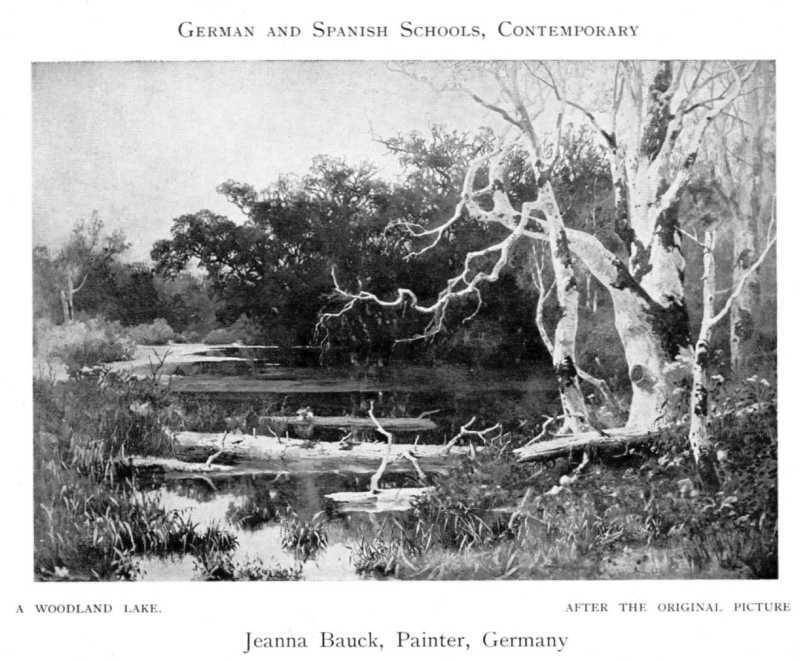
A Woodland Lake

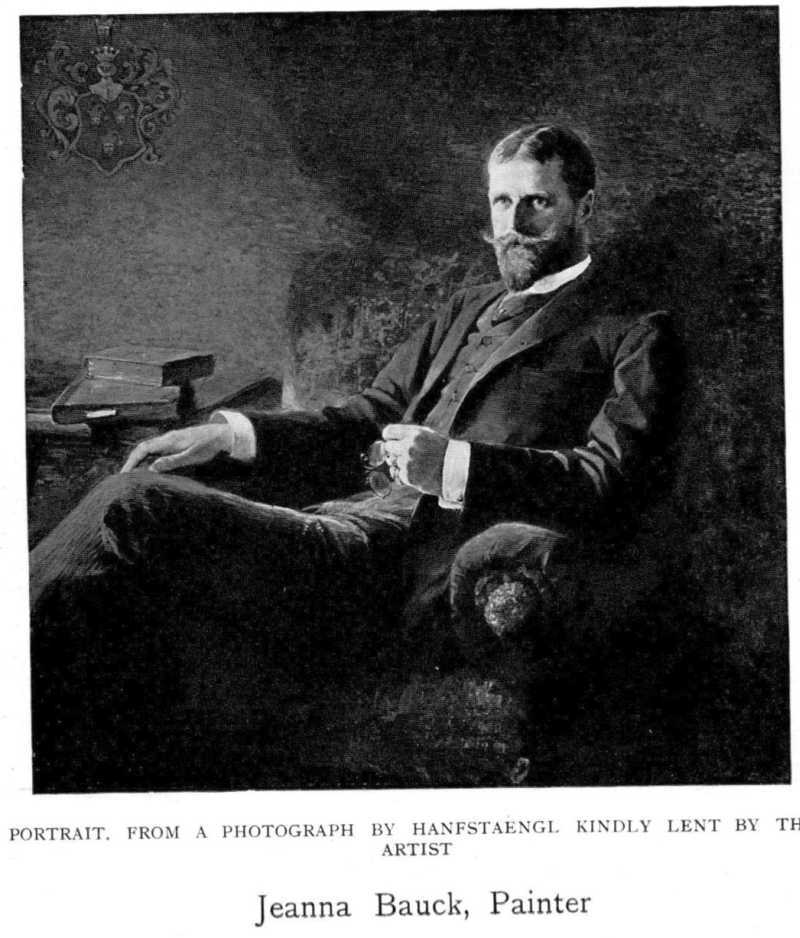
Portrait of a man
