= Jacob Christian Fabricius =

Danish councilor, musician, and composer

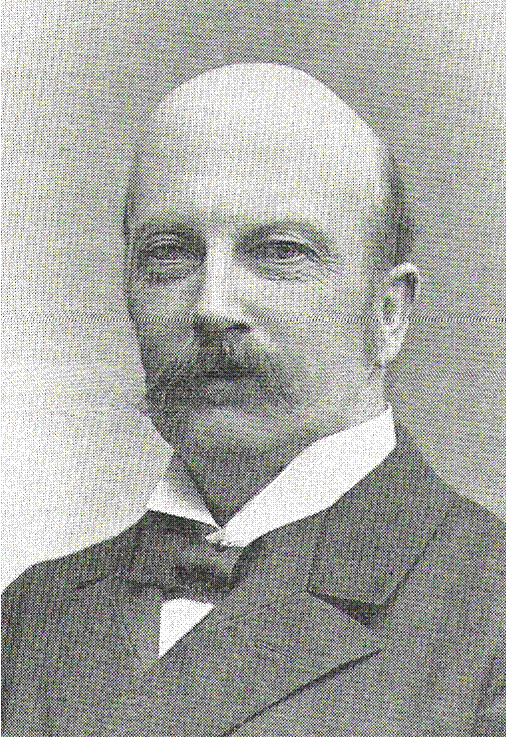
Jacob Christian Fabricius, c. 1905

Jacob Christian Fabricius (3 September 1840, Aarhus – 8 June 1919, Copenhagen) was a Danish councilor, musician, composer and music organizer. Fabricius founded numerous musical societies and institutions during his lifetime. One of the most popular of such societies was Samfund til Udgivelse af dansk musik (Society for the Publication of Danish Music), founded in 1871. His career as a composer centered to a large extent on songs, choir and piano works. His works found success in Germany and France.

== See also ==
- List of Danish composers
