= Edition S =

- Industry: Music publishing
- Genre: Classical music, contemporary, experimental music, sound art
- Founded: 1871
- Founder: Peter Heise, Jacob Fabricius a.o.
- Headquarters: Copenhagen, Denmark
- Products: Sheet music
- Parent: Dacapo Records
- Website: www.edition-s.dk

Edition·S – music¬sound¬art (formerly known as Edition SAMFUNDET and ”Samfundet til Udgivelse af Dansk Musik” – ”The Society for the Publication of Danish Music”) is one of Denmark's oldest publishing houses. It was founded as an association in 1871 by a small circle of composers and musicians around the composer Peter Heise with the purpose of promoting and preserving Danish music. In 1887, after a big decrease in the number of members of the association, the Society decided to publish primarily new music, and this has been the focus ever since. Carl Nielsen, one of Denmark's greatest composers, was a member of the Board from 1899 to his death in 1931 and had a number of works published through the Society before as well as after his death.

In 2011 the publishing house changed its name to Edition S – music¬sound¬art, which was pronounceable for non-Danes as well. This was to accommodate the international scene for new art music that showed an increasing interest in Danish composers.

Edition S has since 1890 been supported financially by the state. The company was restructured and became a private trust in 2007, but the state support is still the main source enabling Edition S to carry on its activity.
