= Eduard Kurzbauer =

Austrian painter (1840–1879)

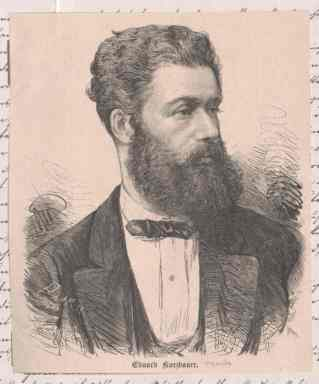
Eduard Kurzbauer (c.1870)

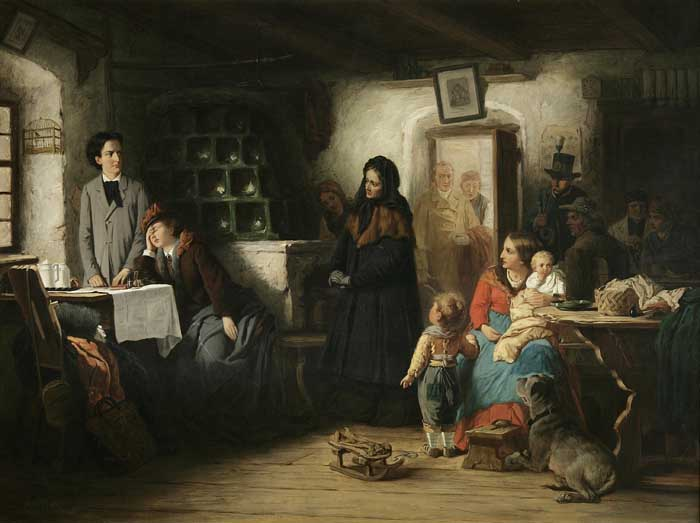
The Refugees, Overtaken

Eduard Kurzbauer (2 March 1840, Vienna - 13 January 1879, Munich) was an Austrian painter. Some sources give Lemberg as his place of birth.

== Life ==
His father was a teacher at the Vienna Polytechnic Institute. In 1856, he began to study lithography, but wasn't satisfied and switched to the Academy of Fine Arts where he remained until 1861, when his father was unable to continue paying his tuition and still support a large family.

Friends came to his assistance, but it wasn't until 1867 that he achieved some success with his painting "The Storyteller". This helped him obtain a position in the studios of Karl von Piloty in Munich, where he worked for two years. His associates there included Hans Makart and Franz Defregger. Afterwards, he continued to study independently and scored his first major success in 1870 with his genre painting Die ereilten Flüchtlinge (The Refugees, Overtaken), which was purchased for the gallery of the Schloss Belvedere. This sale, the commissions that followed and the fees from several students enabled him to take a long-desired study trip to Rome and Naples.

Unfortunately, an ailment he acquired there was left untreated until it was too late. After courageously suffering through several painful operations, he died at the age of thirty-eight, still at work, even on his death bed.

He had a sharp eye for interesting situations and human characteristics, with an occasional splash of roguish humor. Even when representing weakness and suffering, he knew how to maintain the correct tone, without bathos. He is considered a master of chiaroscuro.

In 1889, a street in Leopoldstadt was named the "Kurzbauergasse" in his honor.
