= Speaker of the Landsting =

- Landsting formand (Danish)
- State Flag of Denmark

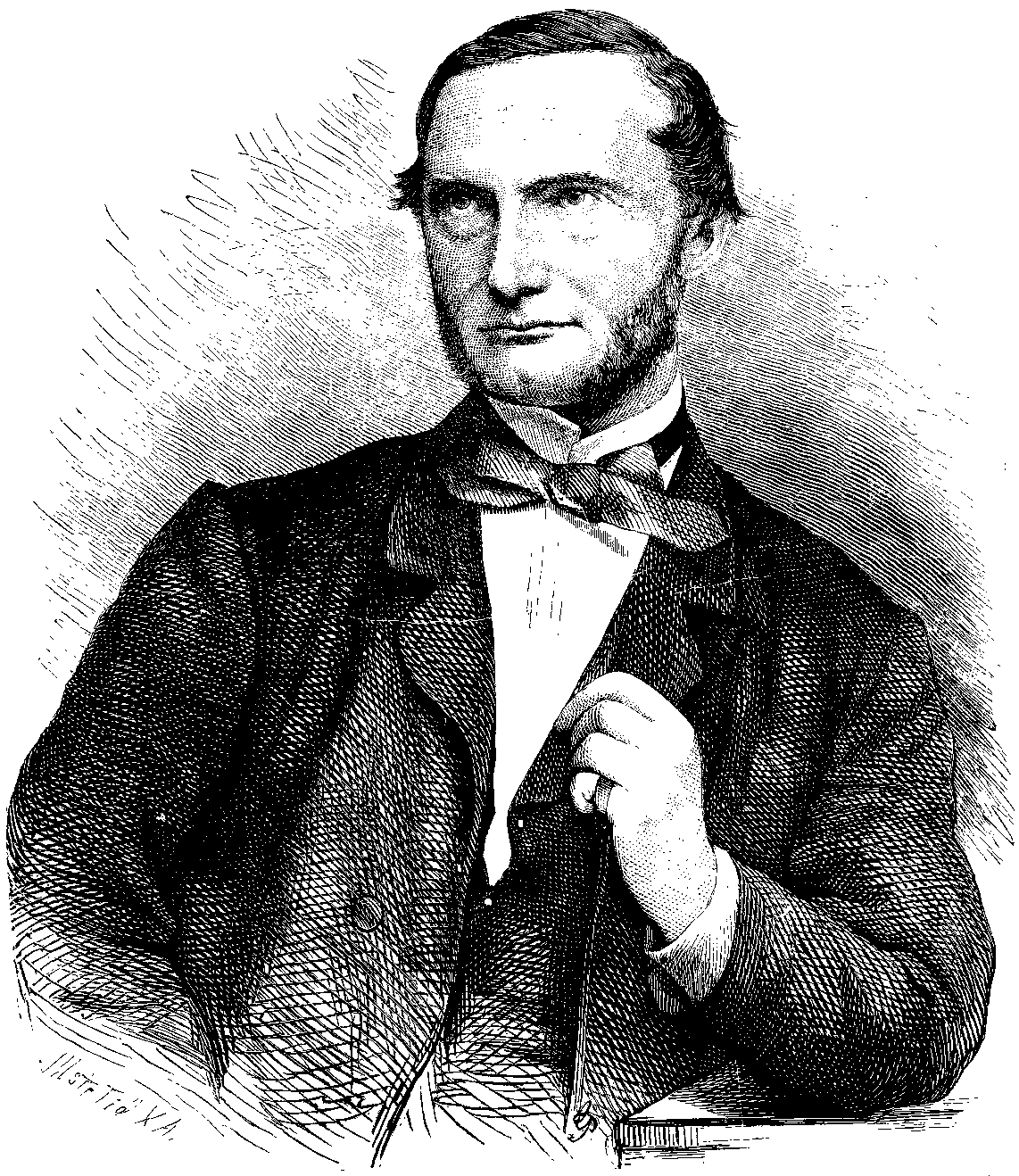
- Longest serving Carl Christian Vilhelm Liebe; 5 October 1869 – 30 September 1894
- Landsting
- Style: Mister/Madam Speaker
- Type: Speaker
- Status: Abolished
- Reports to: Monarch of Denmark
- Residence: Christiansborg
- Constituting instrument: Constitution of Denmark
- Formation: 30 January 1850
- First holder: Peter Daniel Bruun
- Final holder: Ingeborg Hansen
- Abolished: 21 September 1953

The position of Speaker (Danish: Formand) of the Landsting was created in 1850 and existed until it was abolished in 1953.

== List of speakers of the Landsting ==
No.	Portrait	Name (born-died)	Term of office			Political party	Landsting	Ref.
No.	Portrait	Name (born-died)	Took office	Left office	Time in office	Political party	Landsting	Ref.
1		Peter Daniel Bruun (1796–1864)	30 January 1850	3 October 1862	12 years, 246 days	National Liberal	1st 2nd 3rd 4th	
2		Mads Pagh Bruun (1809–1884)	4 October 1862	23 June 1866	3 years, 262 days	National Liberal	4th 5th 6th	
3		Andreas Frederik Krieger (1817–1893)	9 July 1866	11 November 1866	125 days	National Liberal	6th 7th	
(2)		Mads Pagh Bruun (1809–1884)	12 November 1866	4 October 1869	2 years, 326 days	National Liberal	7th	
4		Carl Christian Vilhelm Liebe (1820–1900)	5 October 1869	30 September 1894	24 years, 360 days	Højre	8th 9th 10th 11th 12th 13th	
5		Henning Matzen (1840–1910)	1 October 1894	5 October 1902	8 years, 4 days	Højre	13th 14th 15th	
6		Hans Nicolai Hansen (1835–1910)	6 October 1902	6 October 1907	5 years, 0 days	Free Conservatives	16th 17th	
7		Hans Christian Steffensen (1837–1912)	7 October 1907	3 October 1909	1 year, 362 days	Free Conservatives	17th	
8		Christian Sonne (1859–1941)	4 October 1909	2 October 1910	363 days	Free Conservatives	17th	
9		August Hermann Ferdinand Carl Goos (1835–1917)	3 October 1910	20 July 1914	3 years, 289 days	Højre	18th	
10		Anders Thomsen (1842–1920)	21 July 1914	11 July 1920 #	5 years, 357 days	Venstre	19th 20th 21st	
11		Frits Bülow (1872–1955)	19 August 1920	2 October 1922	2 years, 44 days	Venstre	22nd 23rd	
12		Ole Hansen (1855–1928)	3 October 1922	26 June 1928 #	5 years, 267 days	Venstre	23rd 24th	
13		Jørgen Jensen-Klejs (1863–1947)	3 October 1928	6 October 1936	8 years, 3 days	Venstre	24th 25th 26th	
14		Carl Theodor Zahle (1866–1946)	7 October 1936	2 October 1939	2 years, 360 days	Social Liberal	27th	
15		Carl Frederik Sørensen (1870–1943)	3 October 1939	30 September 1940	363 days	Social Democrats	28th	
16		Charles Petersen (1877–1971)	1 October 1940	31 December 1947	7 years, 91 days	Social Democrats	28th 29th	
17		Karl Kristian Steincke (1880–1962)	7 January 1948	15 March 1950	2 years, 67 days	Social Democrats	30th	
18		Ingeborg Hansen (1886–1954)	16 March 1950	24 April 1951	1 year, 39 days	Social Democrats	30th	
(17)		Karl Kristian Steincke (1880–1962)	25 April 1951	6 October 1952	1 year, 164 days	Social Democrats	31st	
(18)		Ingeborg Hansen (1886–1954)	7 October 1952	21 September 1953	1 year, 39 days	Social Democrats	31st 32nd	

== See also ==
- List of speakers of the Folketing
