= 1953 Danish parliamentary election =

The 1953 Danish parliamentary election can refer to one of three Danish parliamentary elections held in 1953:

- 1953 Danish general election, the first general election held under the new constitution
- 1953 Danish Folketing election, held on 21 April 1953 alongside the Landsting election
- 1953 Danish Landsting election, the last election held for the Landstinget
