= Inger Gautier Schmit =

Danish liberal politician

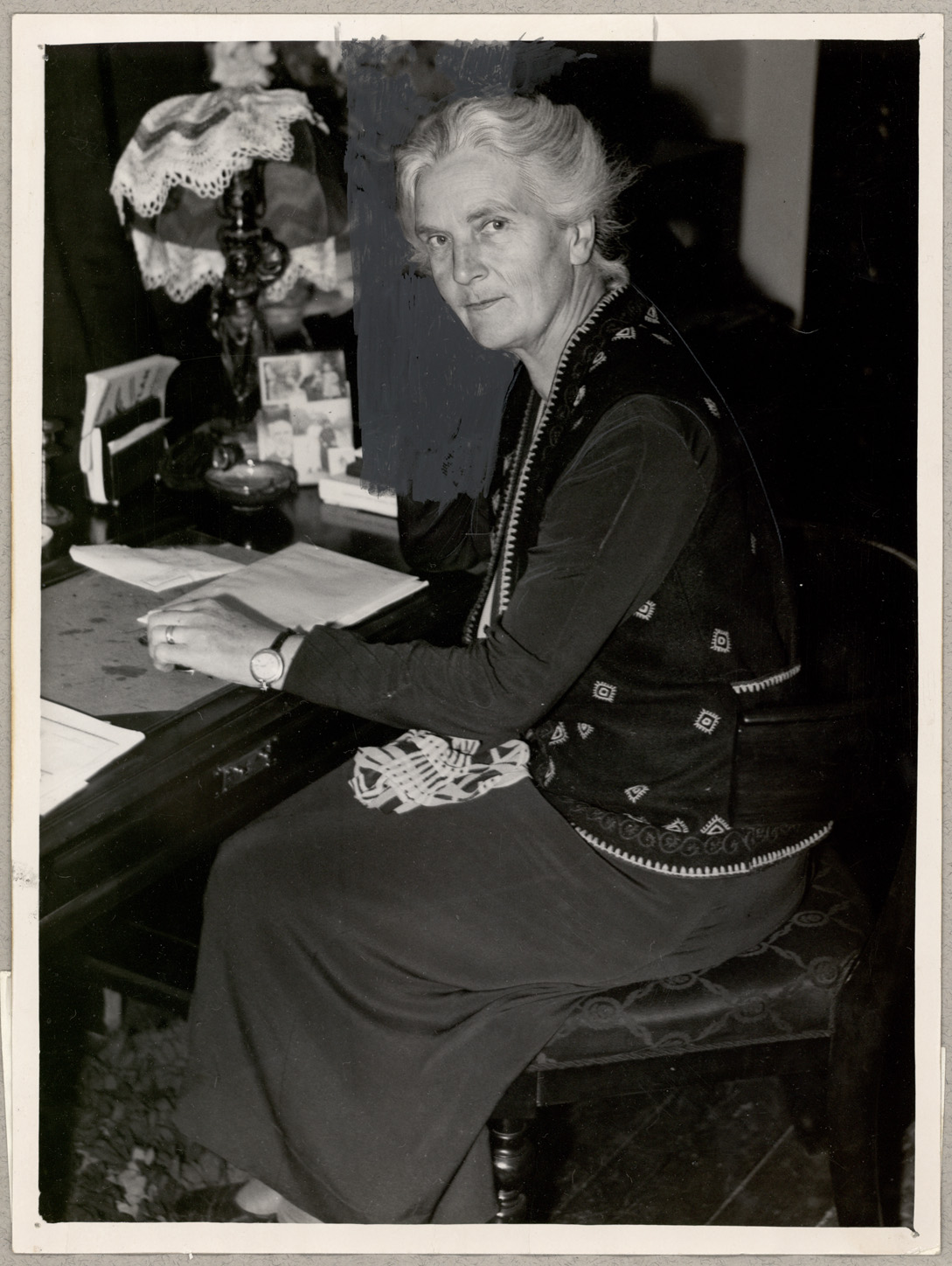
Inger Gautier Schmit

Inger Gautier Schmit (1877–1963) was a Danish politician who represented Venstre or the Liberal Party of Denmark. In 1918, she was one of the first five women to be elected to the Landsting. The others were Nina Bang, Marie Christensen, Marie Hjelmer and Olga Knudsen.

== Biography ==
Born in Randers on 25 October 1877, Inger Gautier was the daughter of the army veterinarian Johan Otto Christian Gautier (1848–1913) and Julie Wilhelmine Langballe (1843–1934). In April 1914, she married William Schmit, (1876–1942) a police chief, with whom she had five children.

In 1881, she moved with her family to Copenhagen where she and her sisters became interested in music. She studied at the Music Conservatory from 1897 to 1899, continuing her studies in Berlin (1903–1904). While staying in the west of Jutland, she was inspired by the Inner Mission to give up music and concentrate on social work.

From 1907, she became closely associated with Copenhagen's Magdalenehjemmet, an institution aimed at helping "fallen women" or prostitutes, taking on managerial functions. In parallel, she studied social affairs in London. After her marriage to William Schmit, she and her husband moved to Samsø where she not only raised five children but became a member of the church council in Tranebjerg (1916–1920). She joined the Venstre party and became a member of their management committee. In 1918, despite little experience of politics, she was one of the first five women to be elected to the Landsting.

Schmit quickly developed her political skills, proving to be an accomplished speaker. While Ventre was represented by three women in the Landsting, it was not represented by women in the Folketing until Schmit succeeded in being elected for Næstved in 1929. After being re-elected she remained there until 1945, ultimately becoming deputy chair. As a result of poor health, she did not stand in 1945 but was elected for Viborg in 1947 with large majority. With a total of 30 years in the Rigsdag, she completed one of the longest careers of the first generation of women parliamentarians.

Inger Gautier Schmit died in Frederiksberg on 14 April 1963. She is buried in Copenhagen's Vestre Cemetery.

== Awards ==
For her long years of service, Gautier was honoured with the Royal Medal of Recompense (gold) in 1949.
