= Hans Christian Steffensen =

Danish politician, jurist and speaker of the Landsting (1837–1912)

Hans Christian Steffensen K.1
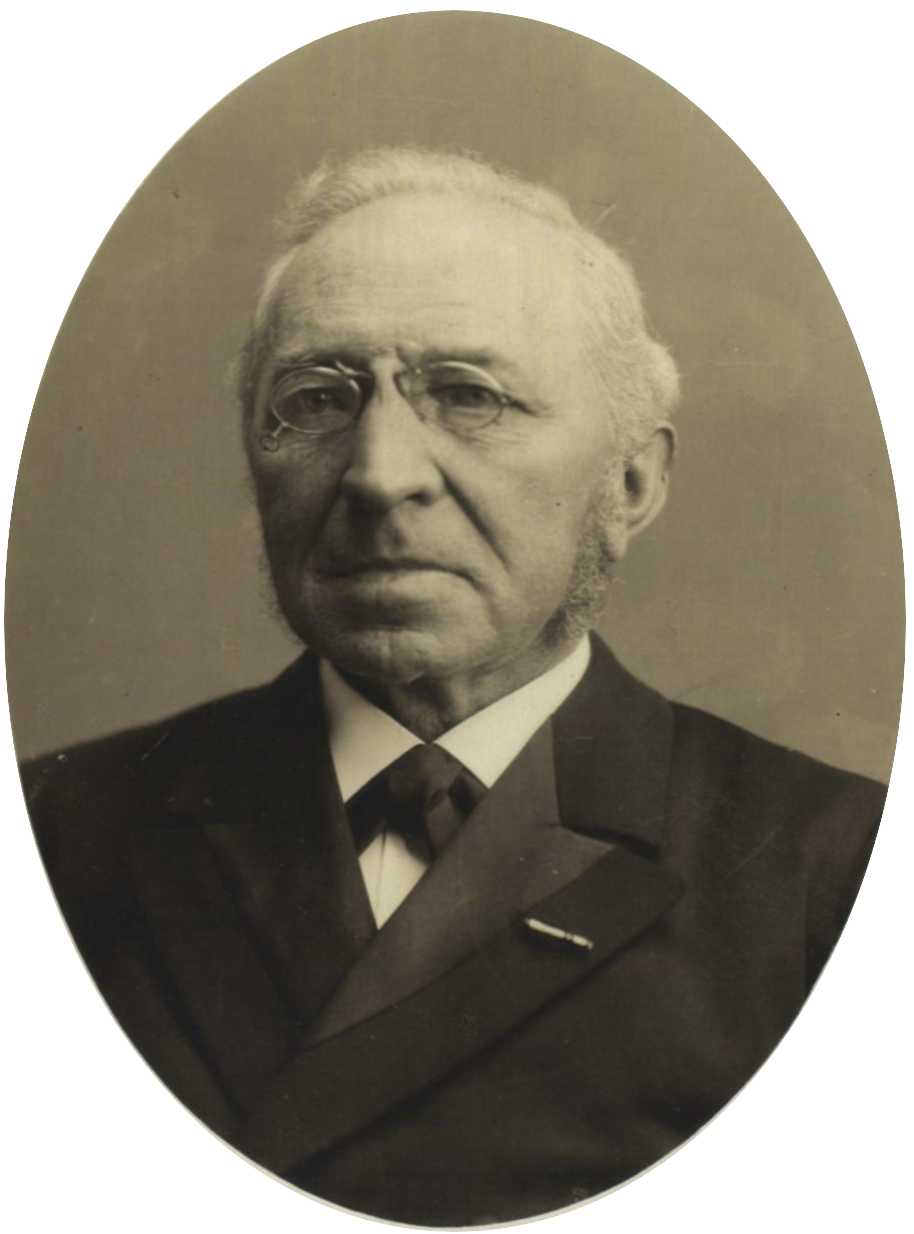
- Steffensen

Speaker of the Landsting
- In office 7 October 1907 – 3 October 1909
- Preceded by: Hans Nicolai Hansen
- Succeeded by: Christian Sonne

Judge Advocate General
- In office 22 November 1883 – 3 August 1910
- Preceded by: Georg Bernhard Bornemann
- Succeeded by: Hans Christian Nicolai Giørtz

Personal details
- Born: 22 December 1837 Hammelev
- Died: 4 September 1912 (aged 74)
- Party: Højre
- Spouse: Elisa Marie Smith (m. 1871)
- Education: Jurist

Hans Christian Steffensen (22 December 1837 – 4 September 1912) was a Danish politician, jurist and speaker of the Landsting, a chamber of the parliament.

He was an elected member of the Folketing from 1879 to 1881 and a royally appointed member of the Landsting from 1888, representing the conservative party Højre until 1900 when he was one of nine Højre-members of the Landsting who left the party in a protest against the government's duty and tax reforms and formed the conservative group De Frikonservative in 1902.

Steffensen was Højre's spokesman on the extensive 1895 reform of the order of business of the Landsting, and he was speaker of the Landsting from 1907 to 1909.

== Notes ==
Political offices
Preceded by Hans Nicolai Hansen	Speaker of the Landsting; 7 October 1907 – 3 October 1909	Succeeded by Christian Sonne
