= Christian Sonne =

Danish politician (1859–1941)

Ole Christian Saxtorph Sonne (21 April 1859 – 25 July 1941) was a Danish government minister and speaker of the Landsting, a chamber of the parliament.

He was an elected member of the Landsting from the 1902 election until 1918. He was originally elected outside the parties in electoral coalition with the conservative party Højre, but joined the Free Conservatives in February 1904. Along with the rest of the Free Conservatives, Sonne joined the Conservative People's Party in 1915, but he left the party again in June 1917 as a protest against the party's intention of pulling Minister without Portfolio Christian Rotbøll out of the Cabinet of Zahle II.

Sonne was Minister for Agriculture for a short term after the Easter Crisis of 1920 as the only member of the Cabinet of Friis who was nationally known beforehand.

== Notes ==
Political offices
Preceded by Hans Christian Steffensen	Speaker of the Landsting; 4 October 1909 – 2 October 1910	Succeeded by Carl Goos
Preceded by Waldemar Oxholm	Minister for Agriculture; 5 April 1920 – 5 May 1920	Succeeded by Thomas Madsen-Mygdal
