= Kirsten Marie Christensen =

Danish politician and women's rights activist

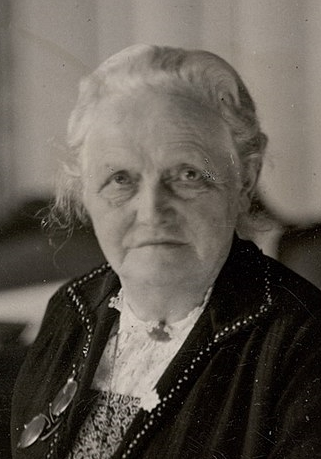
Marie Christensen

Kirsten Marie Christensen (1860–1935) was a Danish politician who represented Venstre or the Liberal Party of Denmark. In 1918, she was one of the first five women to be elected to the Landsting. The others were Nina Bang, Marie Hjelmer, Olga Knudsen and Inger Gautier Schmit.

== Biography ==
Born on 12 December 1860 in Påbol near Ringkøbing, Jutland, Kirsten Marie Christensen was the daughter of the estate owner Mads Christian Christensen (1827–1904) and Karen Jensen (1833–1879). She was raised on an estate in the west of Jutland as the second oldest of nine children. The family was strongly oriented towards the Danish Liberals, her elder brother Jens Christian becoming a key figure after the political reforms of 1901.

She had set her mind on becoming a teacher but her plans were upset when her mother died in 1879 and she had to bring up the remainder of the family. Nevertheless, a few years later, she attended Horsens Kvindeseminarium, a teacher training college for women in Horsens. On receiving her diploma in 1882, she taught in a number of villages until she arrived in Bagterp near Hjørring where she taught until 1925. She became active in the Hjørring branch of the Danish Women's Society from 1910 to 1917.

In Bagterp, she became increasingly active in politics, providing assistance to both criminals and neglected children. It was therefore not surprising that she was put forward as a candidate for Venstre for the 1918 elections. Once elected, she successfully supported parents' influence on the school system though she opposed the school matriculation examination as a prerequisite to a teaching diploma. She was in favour of assisting the children of working mothers, bringing about legislative reforms thanks to her political influence. In 1931, she also ardently supported the establishment of a university in Aarhus. She remained a member of the Landsting until 1932, constantly working towards better conditions for children and schools, including improvements in teacher training.

Marie Christensen died on 22 December 1935 in Copenhagen.
