= Olga Knudsen =

Danish politician and women's rights activist

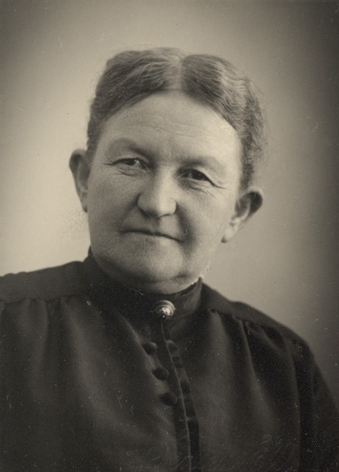
Olga Knudsen

Olga Knudsen (1865–1947) was a Danish politician and women's rights activist who represented Venstre or the Liberal Party of Denmark. In 1918, she was one of the first five women to be elected to the Landsting. The others were Nina Bang, Marie Christensen, Marie Hjelmer and Inger Gautier Schmidt.

== Biography ==
Born on 29 June 1865 in Følle, Syddjurs Municipality, in the east of Jutland, Olga Knudsen was the daughter of Jens Elsbert Knudsen (1826–1901), who managed a grocery business, and Julie Vilhelmine Rønberg (1828–1888). Unlike her two brothers who went to university, she helped in the home, particularly after her mother's death in 1888. Her brother Ivar gained fame for his development of the diesel engine while Morten was a physician in the army. It was through Morten's wife Thora that Olga Knudsen became interested in the women's movement.

She later moved to Vejle with her father but it was not until after his death that she studied drawing at the technical school. From 1902 to 1930, she taught geography and drawing at a girls school in Vejle. Her real interest was nevertheless in women's rights. In 1905, she founded Vejle Women's Association (Vejle Kvindeforening), one of the first association for women in the provinces. In 1907, she collaborated with Elna Munch who founded the Landsforbundet for Kvinders Valgret (National Association for Women's Suffrage), becoming one of its leading members. In 1909, when women were able to participate in municipal elections, she succeeded in being elected in Vejle, becoming a member of the town council where she remained until 1921. Unusually for a woman, she also headed Vejle's Venstre Association from 1918 to 1929.

In 1918, she was one of the first five women to be elected to the Landsting and was the first of them to speak in house. She remained as a representative of Venstre until 1928 when she was replaced by a male candidate. Her main interests in the Landsting were social policy, health and municipal matters. She spent her retirement in Vejle where she took on a number of responsibilities, including the management of a children's home.

Olga Knudsen died in Vejle on 26 September 1947.
