= Hans Nicolai Hansen =

Danish politician and lawyer

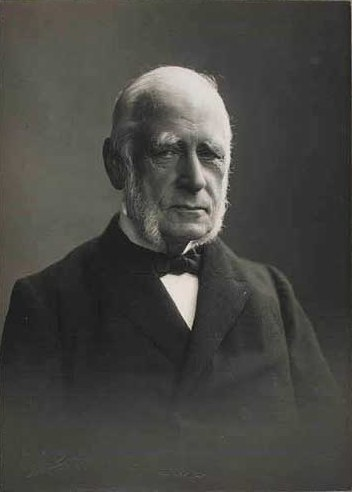
Hans Nicolai Hansen.

Hans Nicolai Hansen (12 March 1835 – 11 January 1910) was a Danish politician, lawyer, and speaker of the Landsting, a chamber of the parliament.

Hansen became a supreme court lawyer in 1863, and in 1873 he left this position to become mayor of the first division of the magistrate of Copenhagen, thus becoming responsible for matters relating to culture and trade licenses, and he held this position until 1897. He was an elected member of the Folketing from 1876 to 1879 and a royally appointed member of the Landsting from 1895 to 1910, representing the conservative party Højre until 1900 when he was one of nine Højre-members of the Landsting who left the party in a protest against the government's duty and tax reforms and formed the conservative group De Frikonservative in 1902. He was speaker of the Landsting from 1902 to 1907.

Political offices
Preceded by Henning Matzen	Speaker of the Landsting; 6 October 1902 – 6 October 1907	Succeeded by Hans Christian Steffensen
