= Ole Hansen (politician) =

Danish politician

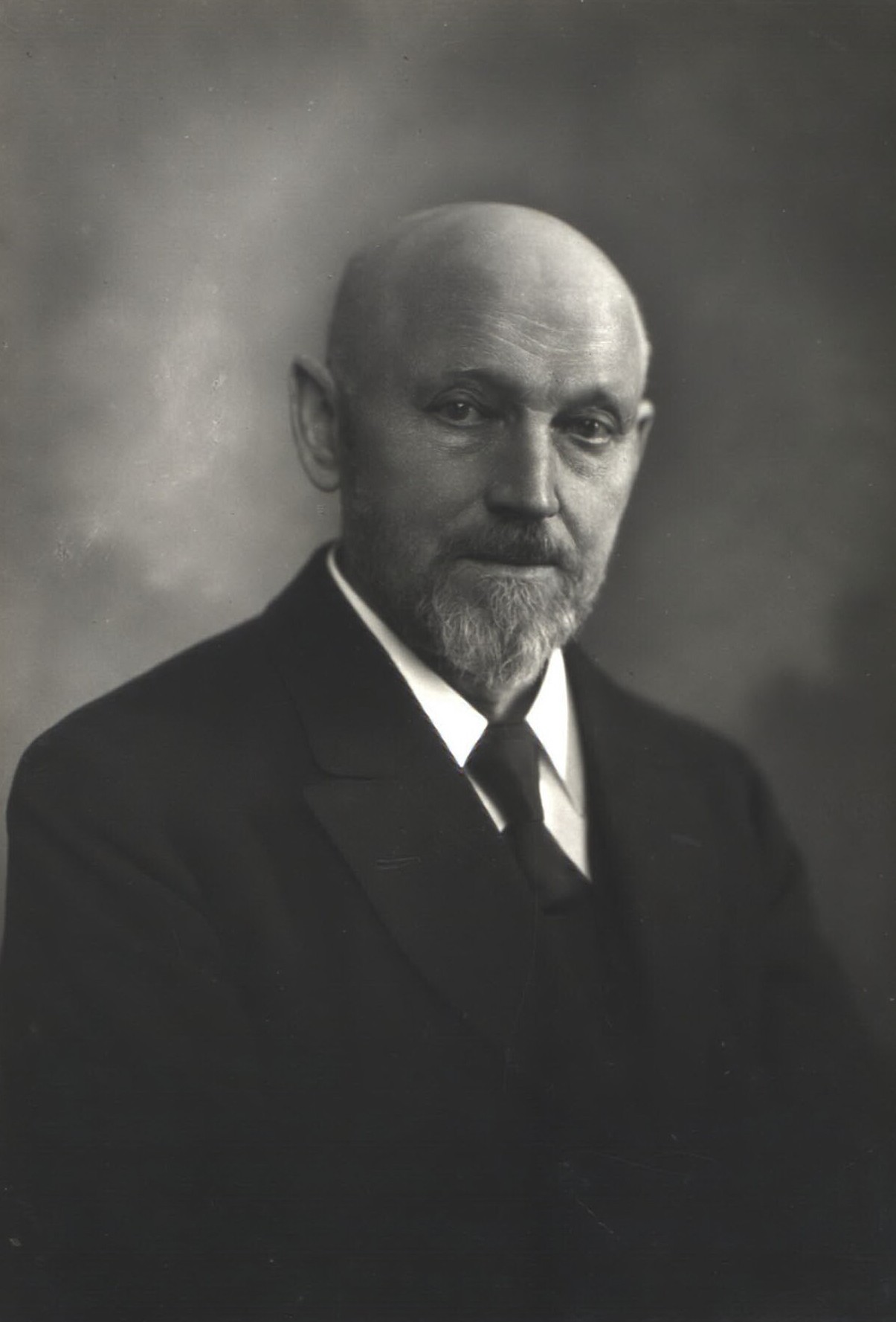
Ole Hansen

Ole Hansen (17 December 1855–26 June 1928) was a Danish politician, farmer and Minister for Agriculture in the Cabinet of Deuntzer and the Cabinet of J.C. Christensen I as a member of the Venstre Reform Party.

He was the first farmer to become a Danish minister.

He was a member of Folketinget from 1890 to 1908 and of the Landsting from 1914 to 1928. In 1922 he became the Speaker of the Landsting until 1928.

Political offices
| Preceded by F. Friis | Minister for Agriculture of Denmark; 24 July 1901 – 24 July 1908 | Succeeded by Anders Nielsen |
| Preceded by Frits Bülow | Speaker of the Landsting; 3 October 1922 – 26 June 1928 | Succeeded by Jørgen Jensen-Klejs |
