= Henning Matzen =

Danish politician, jurist and speaker of the Landsting (1840–1910)

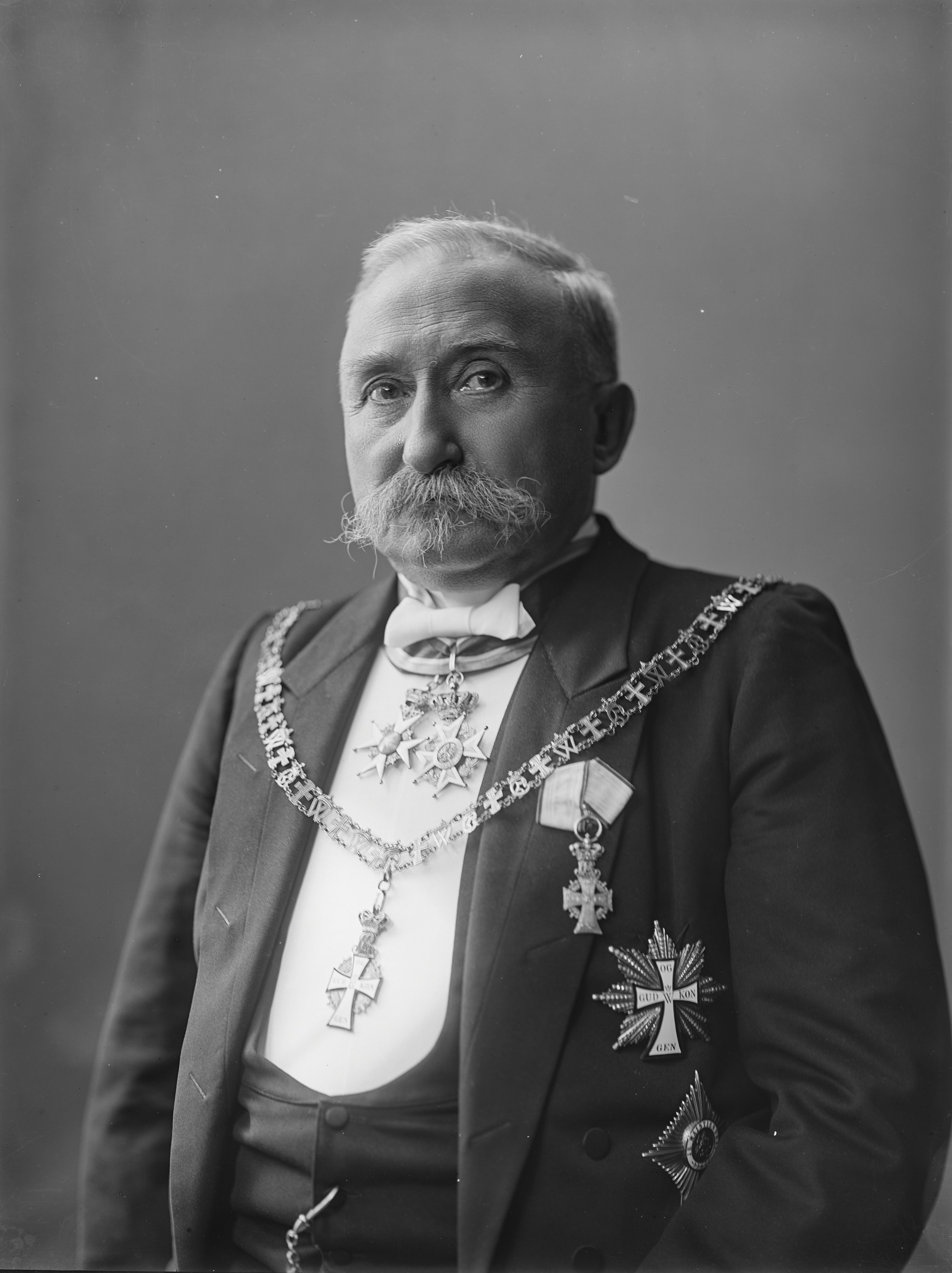
Henning Matzen.

Henning Matzen (28 December 1840 – 18 July 1910) was a Danish politician, jurist and speaker of the Landsting, a chamber of the parliament. He was member of the Landsting from 1879 to 1910, representing the conservative party Højre, and its speaker from 1894 to 1902.

== Biography ==
He graduated from the University of Copenhagen with a degree in law in 1864 and he became a professor at the university in 1870. As one of the leading Danish expounders of constitutional law of his time, he was the legal expert who provided Council President Jacob Brønnum Scavenius Estrup with those interpretations of the constitution that made his rule on provisional laws 1885–1894 possible. In 1902 he acted as the president of the five arbitrators at The Hague in the Pious Fund of the Californias dispute between the United States and Mexico, having been chosen by the other four arbitrators. This was the first dispute between states arbitrated by the Permanent Court of Arbitration.

== Notes ==
Political offices
Preceded by Carl Christian Vilhelm Liebe	Speaker of the Landsting; 1 October 1894 – 5 October 1902	Succeeded by Hans Nicolai Hansen
