= Carl Christian Vilhelm Liebe =

Danish politician

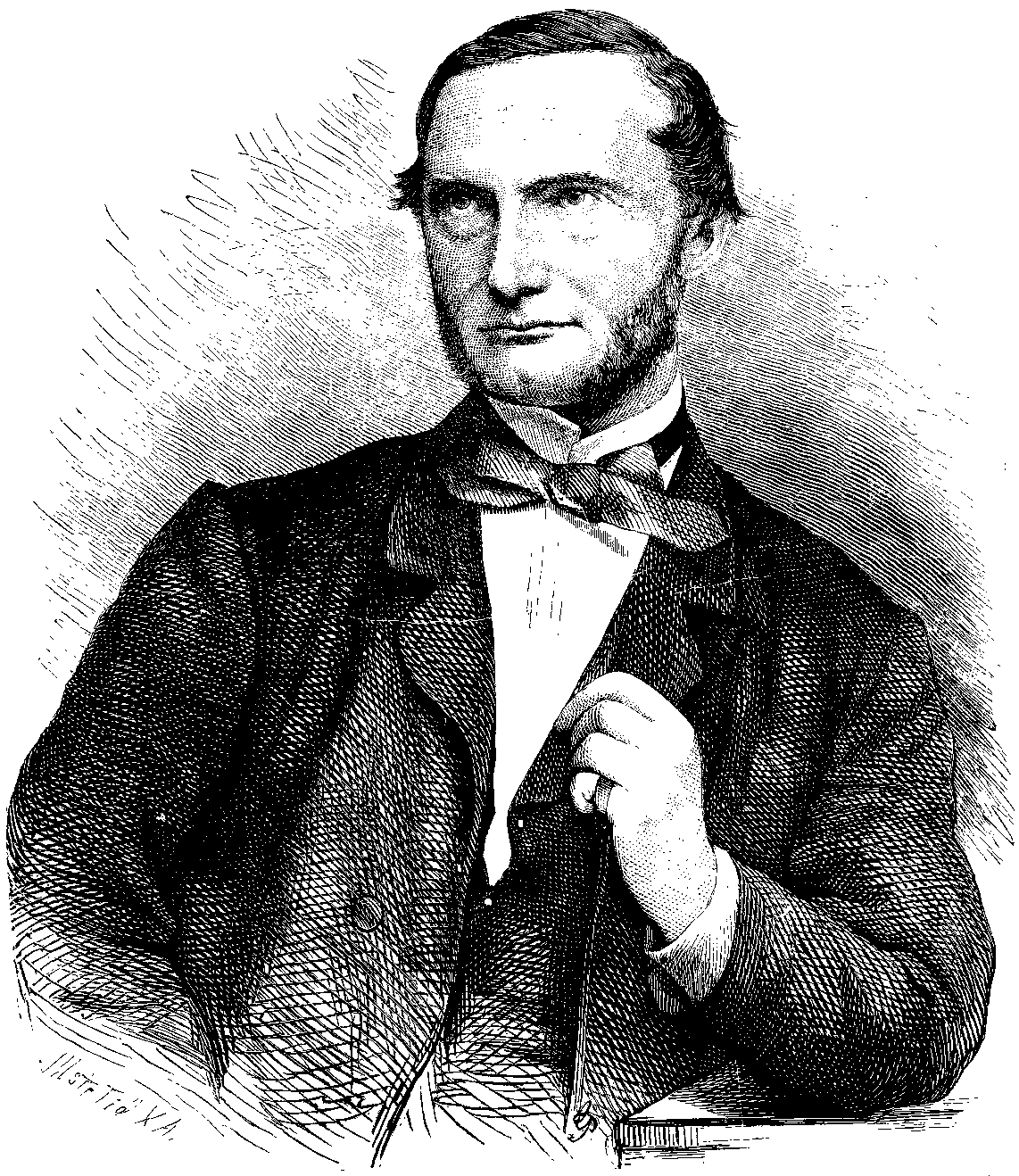
Carl Christian Vilhelm Liebe

Carl Christian Vilhelm Liebe (30 November 1820 – 24 August 1900) was a Danish politician representing first the National Liberal Party and later the conservative Højre, lawyer and speaker of the Landsting, a chamber of the parliament. He was an elected member of the Folketing from 1861 to 1866, and a royally appointed member of the Landsting from 1866 to 1895.

== Early life and education ==
Liebe was born on 30 November 1820 in Roskilde, the son of lawyer Georg Julius Johnsen Liebe (1789-1866) and Caroline Frederikke Munck (1790-1866). His father would later serve as manager of Duebrødre Kloster and University of Copenhagen. He matriculated from Toskilde Cathedral School in 1827 and earned a law degree from the University of Copenhagen (cand.jur.) in 1934.

== Career ==
From 1843 to 1848, Lieve worked in kammeradvokat Poul Sporon' s office (fuldmægtig). He supplemented his income by working as a tutor and was an active member of Studenterforeningen. In 1849-50, he went on a journey to England and France. He was licensed as a Supreme Court attorney in 1851.

In the 1855 case at the Court of Impeachment (Danish: Rigsretten) against members of the Cabinet of Ørsted, he was defence lawyer for Frederik Ferdinand von Tillisch, Christian Albrecht Bluhme, Wilhelm Sponneck and Anton Wilhelm Scheel.

== Personal life ==
On 23 December 1851, Liebe was wed to Ann Sophie Pedersen (1827-1911). She was a daughter of Danish ambassador to the United States Peder Pedersen (1774-1851) and Anna C. L. Smith (1791-1878). One of his sons was Otto Liebe, Prime Minister of Denmark.

== Awards ==
Liebe was created a Knight of the Order of the Dannebrog in 1857. He was awarded the order's Cross of Honour in 1865, was promoted to 2nd'class Knight Commander in 1875 and a 1st-class Knight Commander in 1884. In 1892, he was awarded the Grand Cross.

Political offices
Preceded by Mads Pagh Bruun	Speaker of the Landsting; 5 October 1869 – 30 September 1894	Succeeded by Henning Matzen
