= Landsting =

Landsting may refer to:

- Thing (assembly), the supreme assembly of a land in Scandinavia, during Viking and Medieval times
- Parliament of Greenland
- Landsting (Denmark), one of the two houses of the Danish parliament between 1849 and 1953
- Regions of Sweden, formerly known as Landsting.
