= Mads Pagh Bruun =

Danish politician (1809–1884)

Mads Pagh Bruun (5 September 1809, in Fredericia – 23 September 1884) was a Danish politician and speaker of the Landsting, a chamber of the parliament. He was a member of the National Constitutional Assembly from 1848 to 1849, a member of the Landsting from 1849 to 1853 and again from 1857 to 1874 and a member of the Folketing from 1854 to 1855, representing the National Liberal Party.

Political offices
Preceded by Peter Daniel Bruun	Speaker of the Landsting; 4 October 1862 – 23 June 1866	Succeeded by Andreas Frederik Krieger
Preceded by Andreas Frederik Krieger	Speaker of the Landsting; 12 November 1866 – 4 October 1869	Succeeded by Carl Christian Vilhelm Liebe
