= Peter Daniel Bruun =

Danish politician and lawyer (1796–1864)

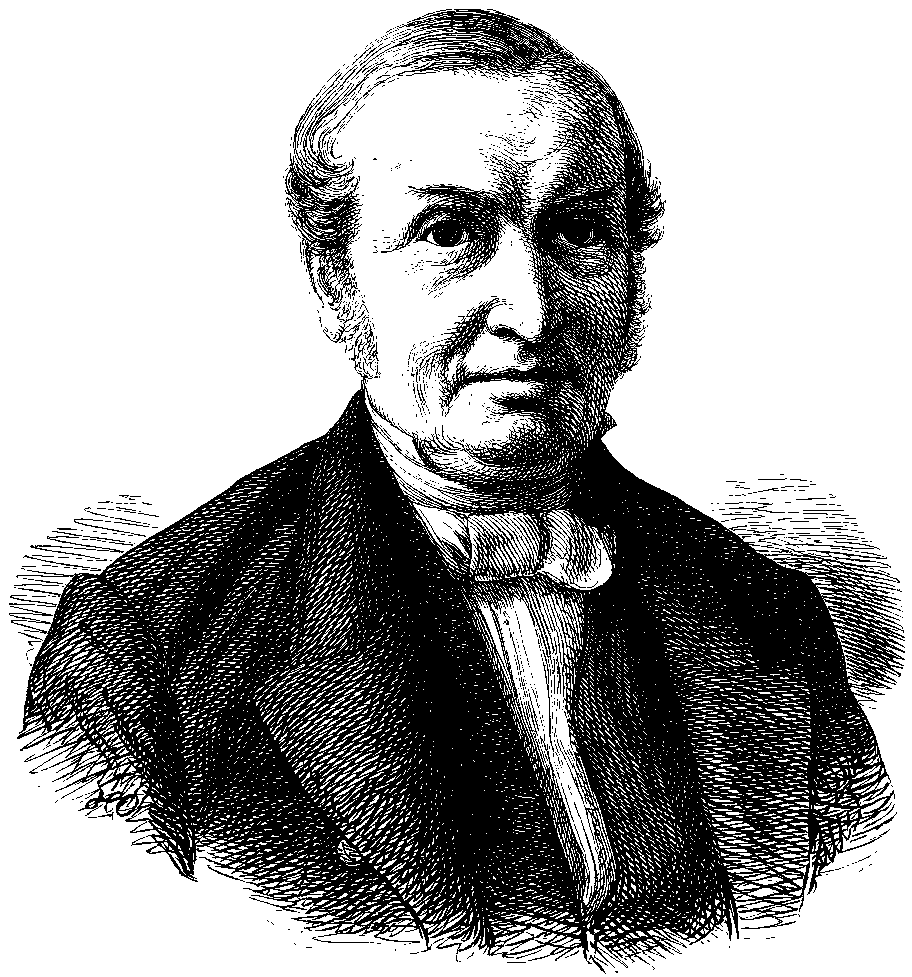
Peter Daniel Bruun

Peter Daniel Bruun (18 December 1796 – 7 June 1864) was a Danish politician and supreme court lawyer and the first speaker of the Landsting, a chamber of the parliament. He was a member of the National Constitutional Assembly from 1848 to 1849 and a member of the Landsting from 1849 to 1862, representing the National Liberal Party.

As members of the National Constitutional Assembly, Bruun and Christian Magdalus Jespersen made the proposal for the constitution that was to become the final version. Key elements in Bruun's and Jespersen's proposal included indirect elections for the Landsting with the requirements to be eligible for election to include a certain minimum income combined with an age of forty years.

When Bruun resigned from politics in 1862, his younger brother Mads Pagh Bruun was elected to the office as speaker.

He was the grandfather of officer, archaeologist and explorer of Greenland Danier Bruun (1856–1931).

== Notes ==
Political offices
Preceded by —	Speaker of the Landsting; 30 January 1850 – July 1862	Succeeded by Mads Pagh Bruun
