= Frits Bülow =

Danish politician (1872–1955)

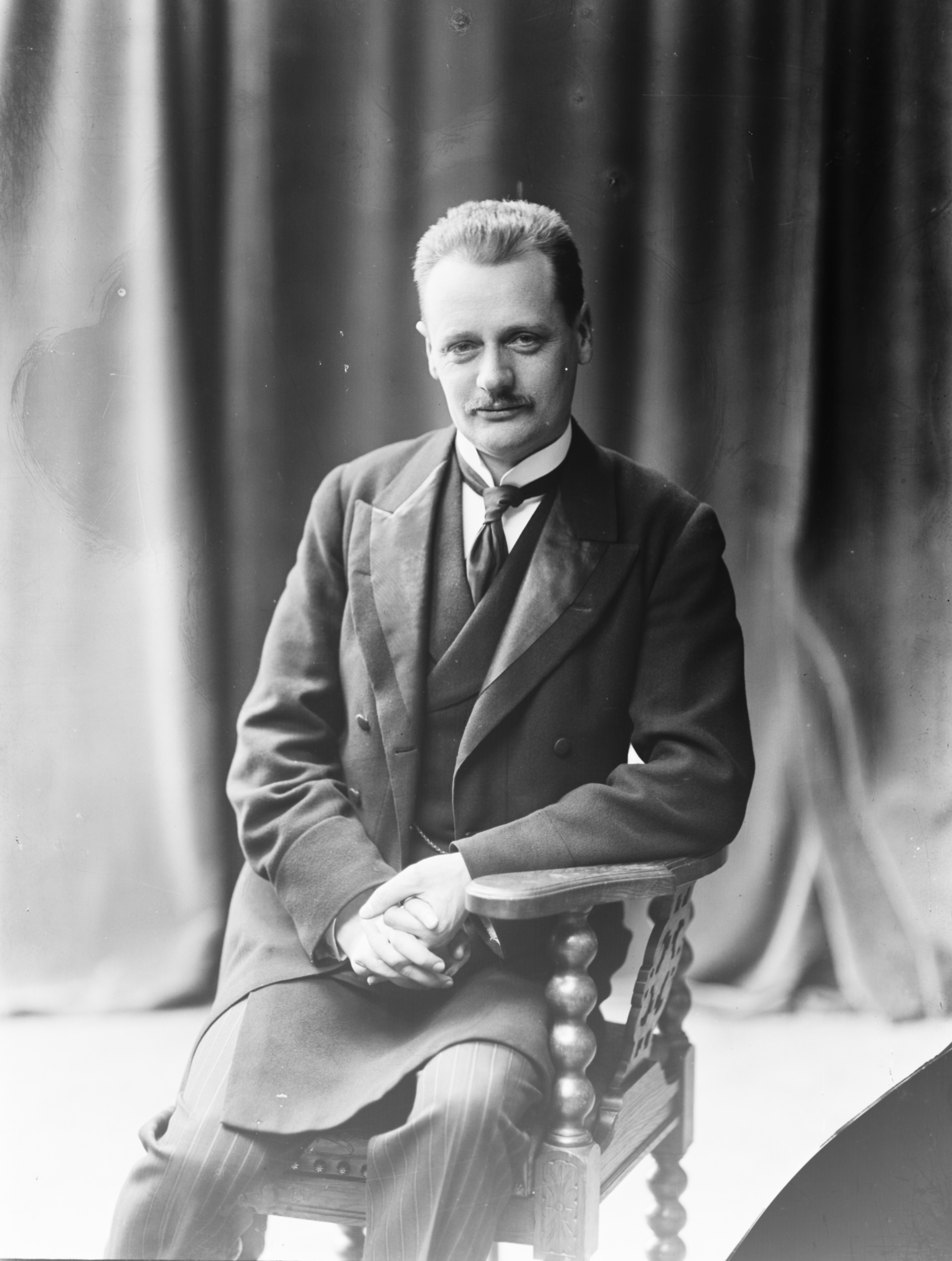
Bülow, 1910

Frits Toxwerdt von Bülow (16 April 1872 – 30 July 1955) was a Danish politician and government minister.

== Early life and education ==
Bülow was born on 16 April 1872 in Aalborg. He was the son of Emil von Bülow (1834–1874), a town clerk and member of the German Bülow family, and his wife, Marie Gabrielle Toxwerdt (1839–1923). He graduated in 1894 and obtained a position working in a law office. In 1898, he graduated in law.

== Career ==
In 1903 at the early age of 30, he was granted the right to plead cases before the Danish Supreme Court.

He was a business lawyer and member of the Højre party, but made contact with members of the Venstre party while defending J.C. Christensen and Sigurd Berg against impeachment charges in the Alberti scandal. As result of these connections he was made Justice Minister in the government of Klaus Berntsen (1910–1913).

He was a member of the Landstinget from 1920 to 1924 and its speaker until 1922. From 1916 to 1922, he served as legal adviser to the Landmandsbanken and also served on the board of Nationalbanken, first as a member and later as chairman. He had to resign as speaker of the Landstinget as a result of the bank's collapse in 1922.

== Personal life and death ==
On 28 March 1899 Bülow married Fanny Augusta Frederikke F. Poulsen, daughter of Jonas Poulsen and Rebekka F. Brandt.

He helped his daughter raise his grandson Claus von Bülow in England during the Nazi occupation of Denmark.

He died on 30 July 1955 in Copenhagen.

Preceded by Carl Theodor Zahle	Justice Minister; 5 July 1910 – 21 June 1913	Succeeded by Carl Theodor Zahle
Preceded by Anders Thomsen	Speaker of the Landsting; 19 August 1920 – 2 October 1922	Succeeded by Ole Hansen
