= Andreas Frederik Krieger =

Danish politician (1817–1893)

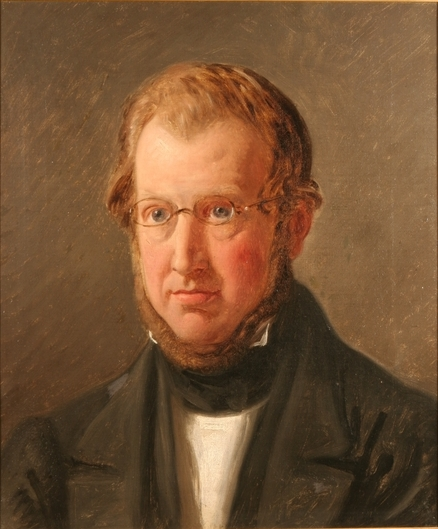
Andreas Frederik Krieger painted by Constantin Hansen in 1848

Andreas Frederik Krieger (4 October 1817, Kolbjørnsvik – 27 September 1893) was a Danish politician, government minister, professor of law and supreme court judge. He was a member of the National Constitutional Assembly from 1848 to 1849, a member of the Folketing from 1849 to 1852 representing the National Liberal Party and a member of the Landsting from 1863 to 1890 representing first the National Liberal Party and later the conservative party Højre.

== Background and legal career ==
Andreas Frederik Krieger was born in 1817 in Kolbjørnsvik in Norway as the son of Danish naval officer Johannes Krieger, who was of an ennobled family, and a Norwegian mother, Anna Elisa Finne. Krieger grew up in Copenhagen and graduated from the University of Copenhagen with a legal degree at the age of 20, specializing in constitutional law. From 1845 to 1855 he was a professor of law at the University of Copenhagen, lecturing primarily in civil law.

== Political career ==
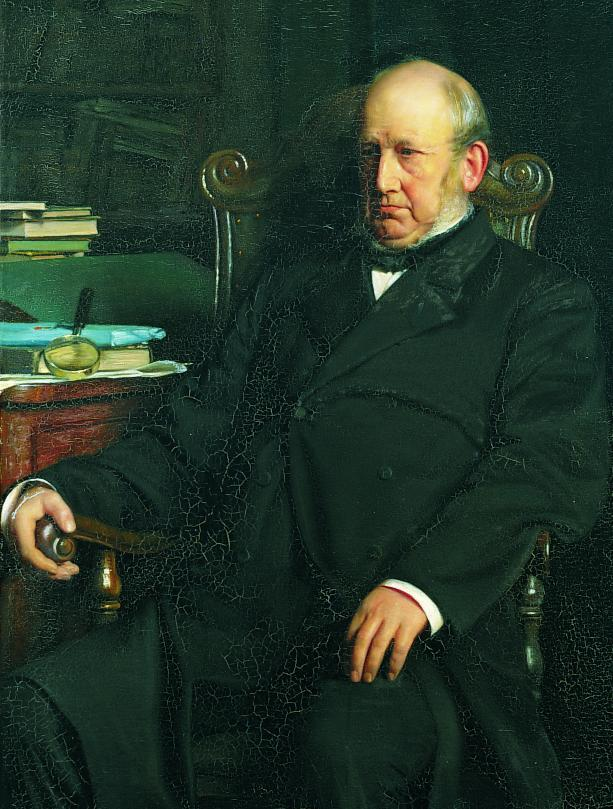
Krieger painted by Carl Bloch in 1882

Krieger was elected to the constitutional assembly in 1848, representing the National Liberal Party. He advocated delaying processing the proposal for the constitution until representatives for Schleswig could be elected — the outbreak of the First Schleswig War had rendered this impossible and the proposal was renamed from Constitution for the Kingdom of Denmark and Schleswig to Constitution for the Realm of Denmark instead. Krieger was a supporter of the so-called "Eider-Danish" doctrine which would involve "Danification" of the Duchy of Schleswig (and neither the Duchy of Holstein nor the Duchy of Lauenburg) and which dominated the national liberal politics on the Schleswig-Holstein Question.

Krieger was elected to the Folketing in the first elections in 1849, and he remained a member until 1852. He became Minister for Interior Affairs in 1856 in the Cabinet of Andræ and the first Cabinet of Hall, and he passed, among other things, an act on the construction of an east–west railroad in Jutland and a reform of the administration of Copenhagen Municipality.

After the death of her husband in 1860, Krieger became a close friend of actress Johanne Luise Heiberg, and they were both among the most vocal critics of Frederick VII's morganatic marriage with Louise Rasmussen, and in private letters to Heiberg, but not publicly, Krieger described himself as a Republican. Until Frederick VII influenced by Louise Rasmussen in 1859 unseated the cabinet and appointed Carl Edvard Rotwitt Council President, Krieger had along with Carl Christian Hall and Carl Andræ been part of the small inner circle of national liberal politicians who effectively ran the country from the weekly dinners at Andræ's home. From 1863 to 1890 he was a member of the Landsting, and he was its Speaker for a while in 1866.

He became represented in the government again from 1872 to 1874 in the Cabinet of Holstein-Holsteinborg, as Justice Minister for a short term in 1872 and as Finance Minister until 1874. As Finance Minister, he administered Denmark's accession to the Scandinavian Monetary Union in 1873, replacing the former currency—the rigsdaler—with the krone.

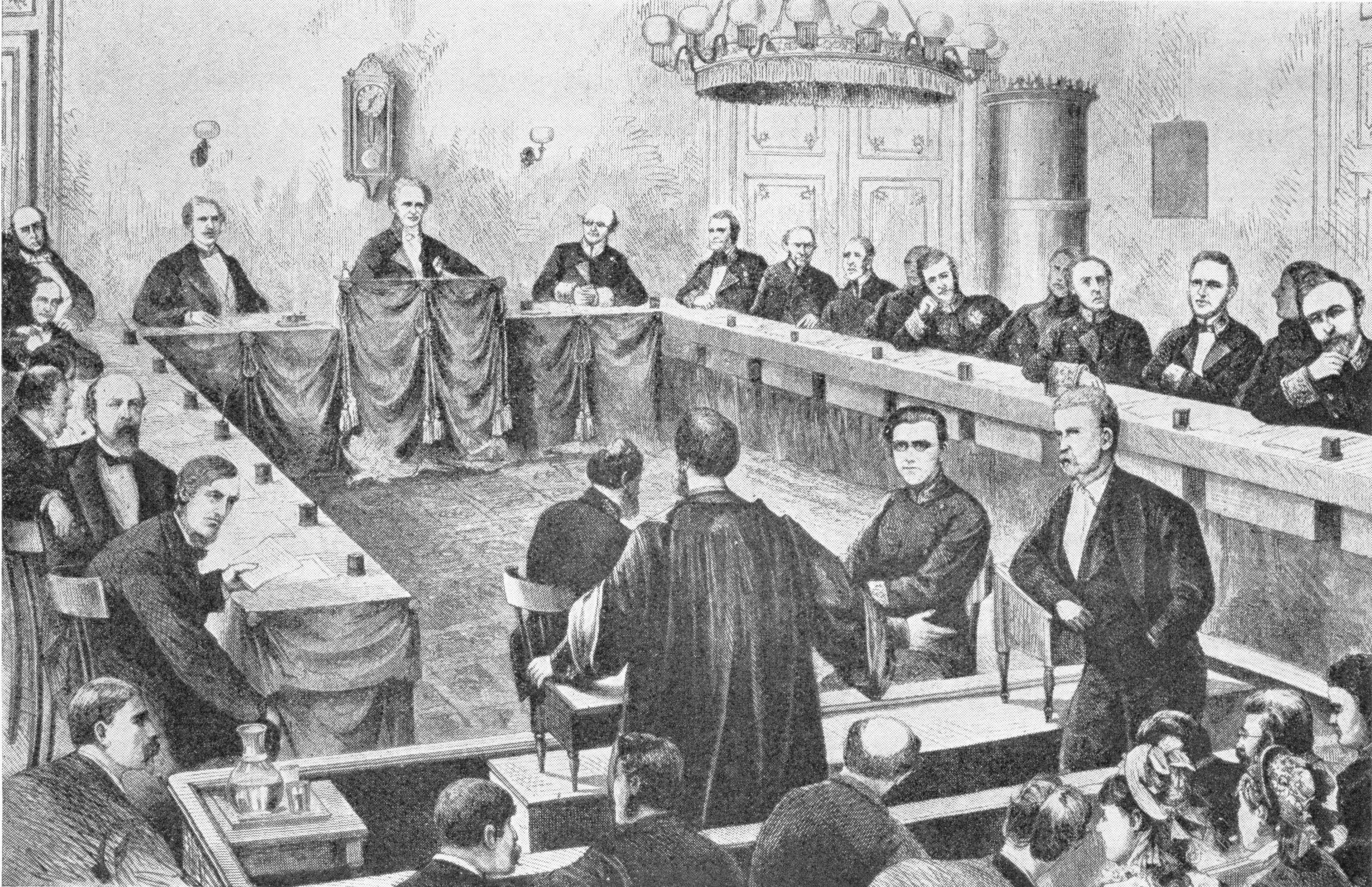
The Court of Impeachment in session in 1877

On 25 January 1877, a case at the Court of Impeachment (Danish: Rigsretten) was started against Krieger by the Folketing involving his sale of the ruins of the Frederik's Church in Copenhagen and the church square to Carl Frederik Tietgen while Finance Minister in 1874. The construction of the church had been started in 1749 but was halted in 1770 by Johann Friedrich Struensee, and the partial building had essentially lain untouched since then. Tietgen had purchased the site for 100,000 Rigsdaler—none of which was to be paid in cash—on the condition that he would build a church in a similar style on the site and donate it to the state when complete, while in turn, he acquired the rights to subdivide neighboring plots for development. Krieger was acquitted.

== Personal life ==
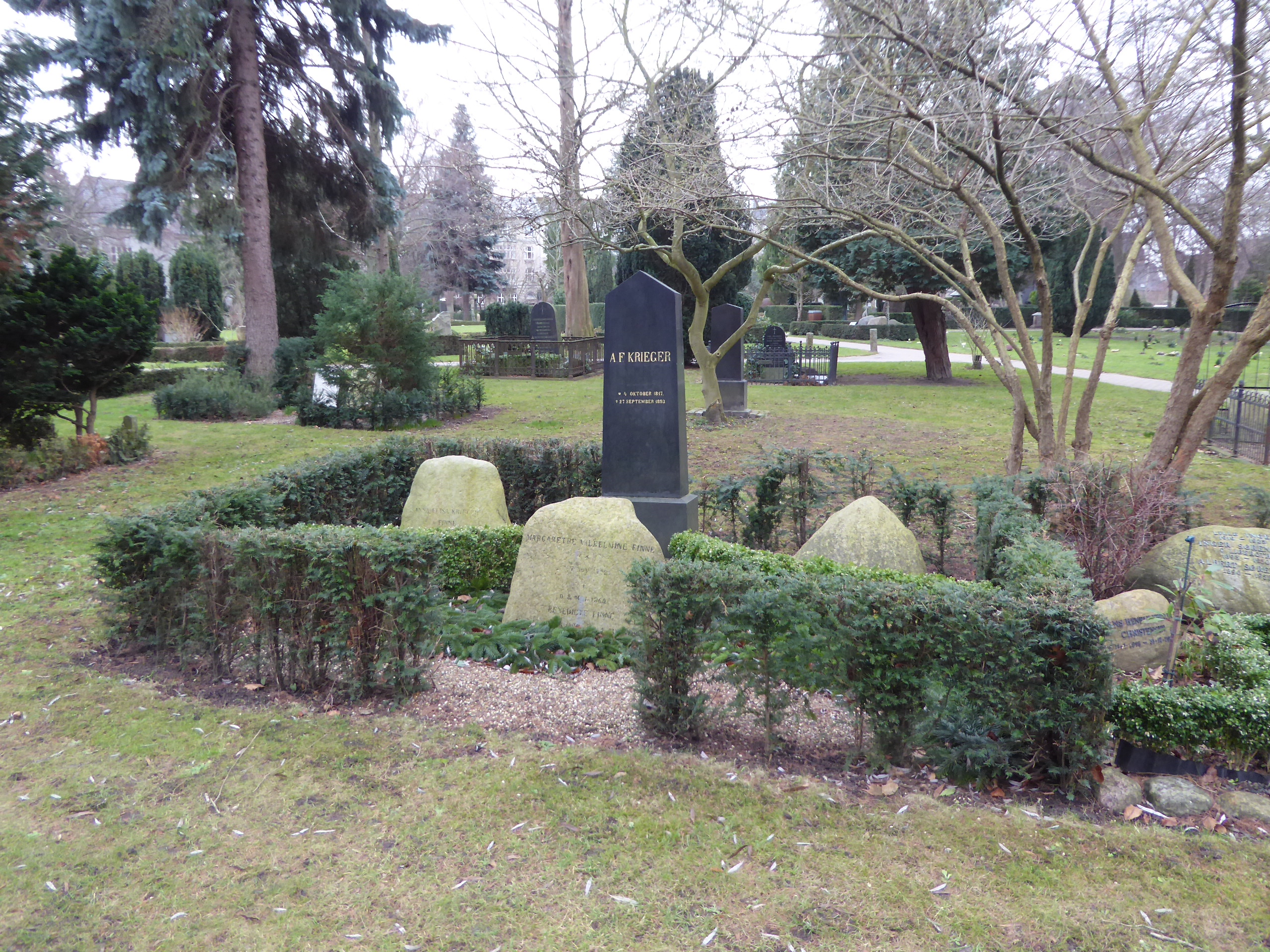
Krieger's grave at the Cemetery of Holmen in Copenhagen

Krieger remained unmarried throughout his life. He lived at Kronprinsessegade 40 from 1845 to 1857, then at Nørregade 24 from 1858 to 1864 and finally at Rosenvængets Hovedvej 23 in Østerbro from 1865 to 1893.

He died on 27 September 1893 and is buried in the Cemetery of Holmen.

== Notes ==
Political offices
Preceded by Iver Johannes Unsgaard	Minister of Interior Affairs; 18 October 1856 – 1 August 1858	Succeeded by Iver Johannes Unsgaard
Preceded by Carl Christoffer Georg Andræ	Finance Minister; 10 July 1858 – 6 May 1859	Succeeded by Carl Emil Fenger
Preceded by Iver Johannes Unsgaard	Minister of Interior Affairs; 6 May 1859 – 2 December 1859	Succeeded by Johan Christian von Jessen
Preceded by Mads Pagh Bruun	Speaker of the Landsting; 9 July 1866 – 11 November 1866	Succeeded by Mads Pagh Bruun
Preceded by Carl Ludvig Vilhelm Rømer von Nutzhorn	Justice Minister; 28 May 1872 – 1 July 1872	Succeeded by Christian Sophus Klein
Preceded by Ludvig Holstein-Holsteinborg	Finance Minister; 1 July 1872 – 20 June 1874	Succeeded by Ludvig Holstein-Holsteinborg
