= Thomas Madsen-Mygdal =

Danish politician

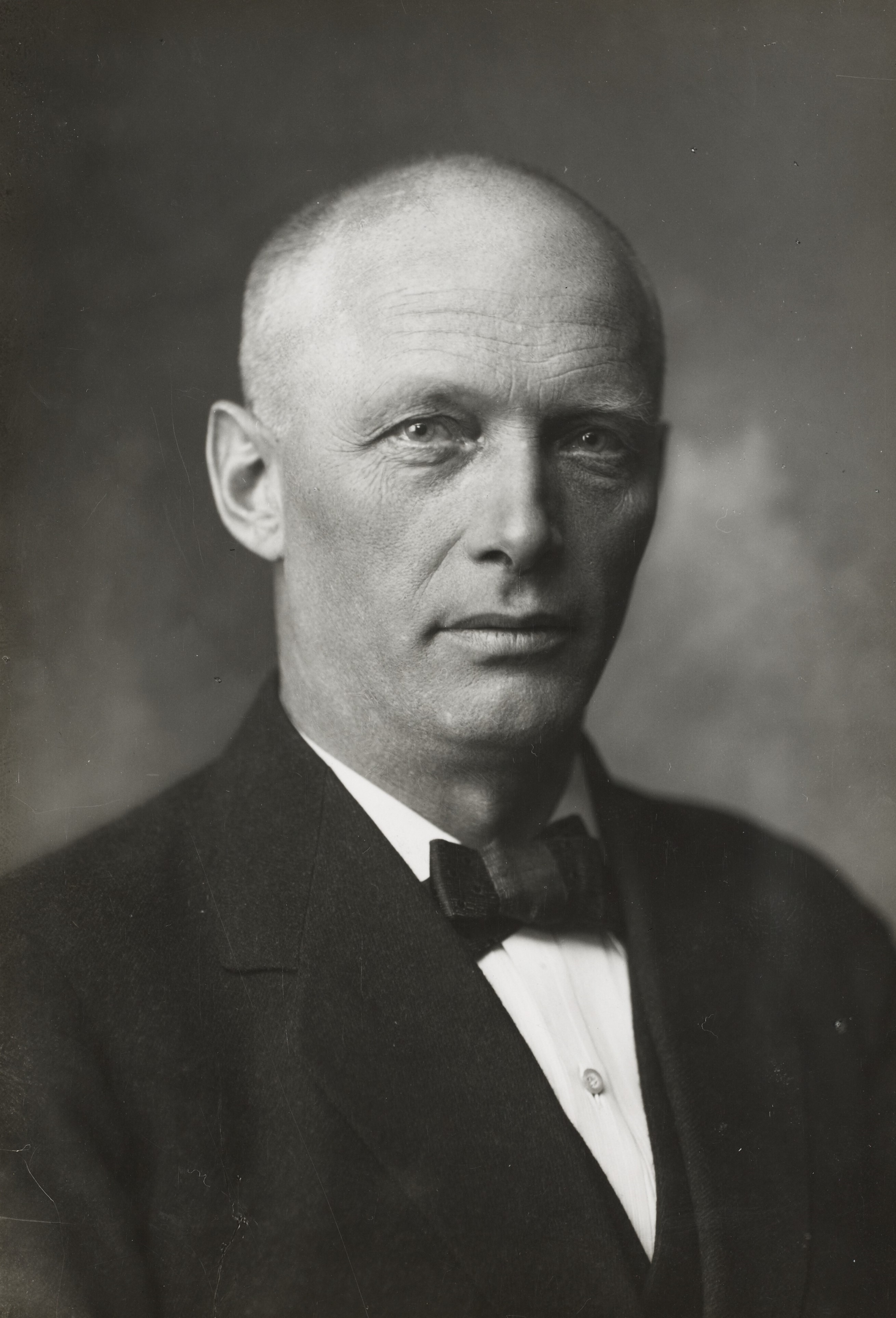

Prime Minister of Denmark
- In office 14 December 1926 – 30 April 1929
- Monarch: Christian X
- Preceded by: Thorvald Stauning
- Succeeded by: Thorvald Stauning

Minister for Agriculture
- In office 14 December 1926 – 30 April 1929
- Prime Minister: Himself
- Preceded by: Kristen Bording
- Succeeded by: Kristen Bording
- In office 5 May 1920 – 23 April 1924
- Prime Minister: Niels Neergaard
- Preceded by: Christian Sonne
- Succeeded by: Kristen Bording

Personal details
- Born: 24 December 1876 Mygdal, Hjørring, Denmark
- Died: 23 February 1943 (aged 66) Copenhagen, Denmark
- Party: Venstre

Thomas Madsen-Mygdal (24 December 1876 – 23 February 1943) was a Danish politician from Venstre who served as the prime minister of Denmark from 1926 to 1929. He was also minister for agriculture from 1920 to 1924 and again while concurrently being prime minister.

== Early life and education ==
Madsen-Mygdal was born in Mygdal, Vendsyssel, the son of landstingsmand, statsrevisor N.P. Madsen-Mygdal (1835–1913) and Ane Kirstine Jacobsen (1839–1902). He became a teacher from Jelling Seminarium but later studied agriculture.

== Political career ==
Thomas Madsen-Mygdal was a self-taught farmer, and was also Minister of Agriculture while he was Prime Minister, as he had also been in the Cabinet of Neergaard.

His government had the parliamentary support of the Conservative People's Party, but he lost their support in 1929 when the Conservative People's Party was not satisfied with the resources allocated to the military in the budget. Having lost his parliamentary support on this important issue, new elections were held, and the Social Democrats and the Danish Social Liberal Party came into power.

The University of Aarhus was founded under his government.

== Personal life and education ==
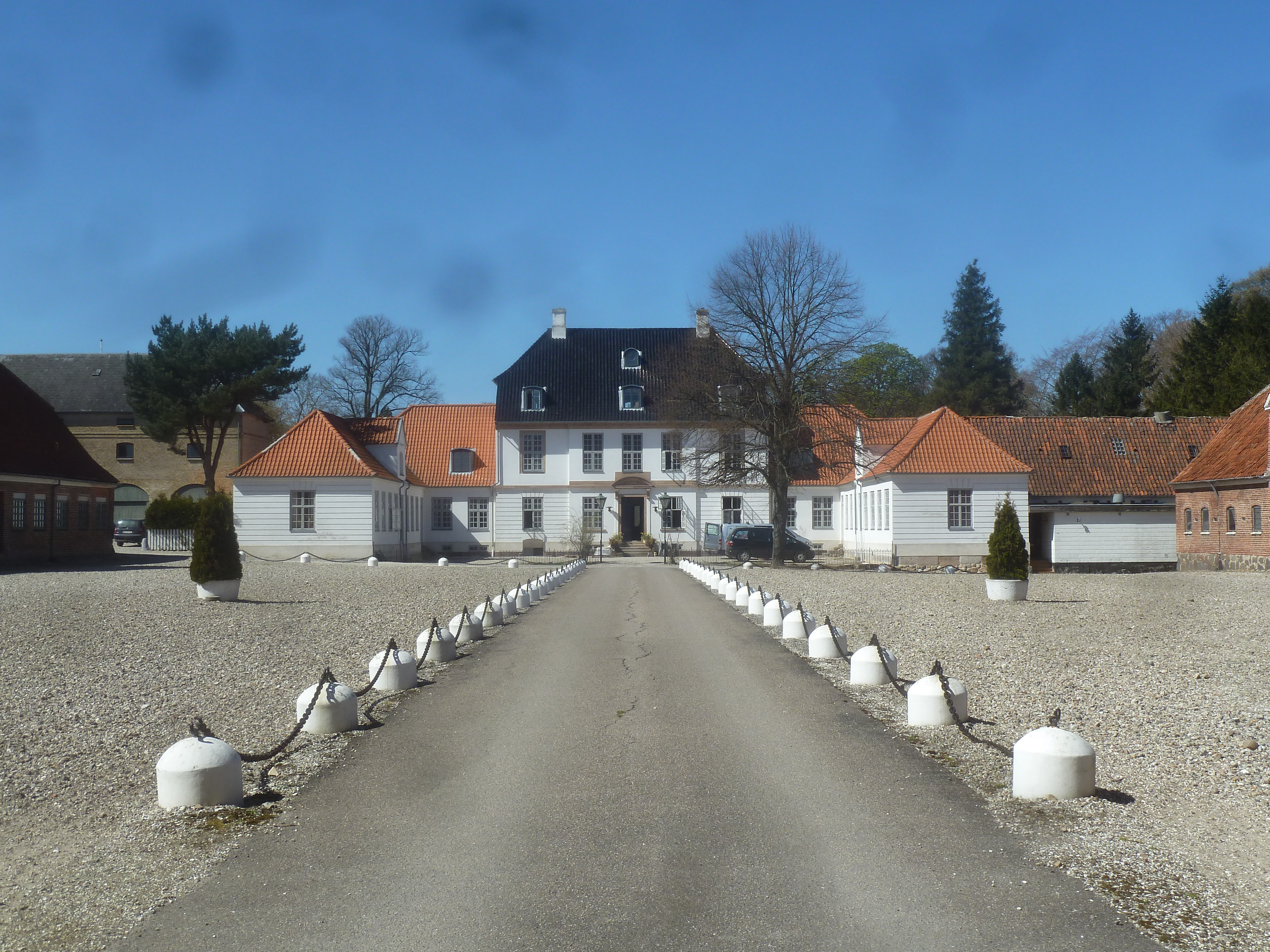
Edelgave

Madsen-Mygdal married Marie Deichmann, née Rovsing (27 December 1885 - 15 December 1955) on 15 November 1907 in Gentofte. He owned Edelgave from 1921 and until his death. His widow kept the estate until her death in 1955.

Political offices
Preceded by O.C.S. Sonne	Minister for Agriculture of Denmark; 5 May 1920 – 23 April 1924	Succeeded by Kristen Bording
Preceded by Thorvald Stauning	Prime Minister of Denmark; 14 December 1926 – 30 April 1929	Succeeded by Thorvald Stauning
Preceded by Kristen Bording	Minister for Agriculture of Denmark; 14 December 1926 – 30 April 1929	Succeeded by Kristen Bording
Party political offices
Preceded by ?	Leader of Venstre; 1929–1941	Succeeded by Knud Kristensen
