= 1918 Danish Landsting election =

Landsting elections were held in Denmark on 11 May 1918, with the exceptions that the seats elected by the resigning parliament were elected on 20 March 1918, the Faroese member was elected on 13 May, and the electors that elected the candidates standing in the constituencies were elected on 30 April.

It was the first Landsting election under the new Constitution of 1915 that gave women the right to vote, abolished the monarch's right to appoint members of the Landsting, introduced the system of Landsting members elected by the resigning parliament, and increased the number of seats in the Landsting from 66 to 72. The seats of all seven constituencies as well as the seats elected by the parliament were up for election.

== Results ==
Party	Seats		
Party	Electors	Parliament	Total
Venstre	19	7	26
Conservative People's Party	10	8	18
Social Democratic Party	14	1	15
Danish Social Liberal Party	10	2	12
Industry Party	0	0	0
Other parties	1	0	1
Total	54	18	72
Source: Wendt
