= 1953 Danish Folketing election =

Election for the lower house of Danish Parliament

- 21 April 1953
- All 151 seats in the Folketing; 76 seats needed for a majority
- Turnout: 80.80%
Party	Leader	Vote %	Seats	+/–
Social Democrats	Hans Hedtoft	40.39	61	+2
Venstre	Erik Eriksen	22.06	33	+1
Conservatives	Ole Bjørn Kraft	17.31	26	−1
Social Liberals	Jørgen Jørgensen	8.64	13	+1
Justice	Oluf Pedersen	5.62	9	−3
Communists	Aksel Larsen	4.78	7	0
Elected in the Faroe Islands
Union	Johan Poulsen	45.00	1	0
Social Democratic	Peter Mohr Dam	44.58	1	0
This lists parties that won seats. See the complete results below.
Prime Minister before	Prime Minister-elect
Erik Eriksen; Venstre	Erik Eriksen; Venstre

Folketing elections were held alongside Landsting elections in Denmark on 21 April 1953, except in the Faroe Islands where they were held on 7 May. The Social Democratic Party remained the largest in the Folketing, with 61 of the 151 seats. Voter turnout was 81% in Denmark proper but just 20% in the Faroes.

They were the last elections under the bicameral system, as the Landsting was abolished later in the year.

== Results ==
Party	Votes	%	Seats	+/–
Denmark proper
Social Democrats	836,507	40.39	61	+2
Venstre	456,896	22.06	33	+1
Conservative People's Party	358,509	17.31	26	–1
Danish Social Liberal Party	178,942	8.64	13	+1
Justice Party of Denmark	116,288	5.62	9	–3
Communist Party of Denmark	98,940	4.78	7	0
Danish Unity	16,383	0.79	0	New
Schleswig Party	8,438	0.41	0	0
Total	2,070,903	100.00	149	+1
Valid votes	2,070,903	99.68		
Invalid/blank votes	6,712	0.32		
Total votes	2,077,615	100.00		
Registered voters/turnout	2,571,311	80.80		
Faroe Islands
Union Party	1,515	45.00	1	0
Social Democratic Party	1,501	44.58	1	0
Self-Government	351	10.42	0	0
Total	3,367	100.00	2	0
Valid votes	3,367	98.94		
Invalid/blank votes	36	1.06		
Total votes	3,403	100.00		
Registered voters/turnout	17,057	19.95		
Source: Nohlen & Stöver
