= 1902 Danish Landsting election =

Landsting elections were held in Denmark on 19 September 1902, with the exception that the Faroese candidate was elected on 6 August.

Of the twelve constituencies the seats representing constituencies number 3 (Sorø County and Præstø County), number 5 (Maribo County), number 6 (Odense County and Svendborg County), number 8 (Thisted County, parts of Viborg County and parts of Ringkøbing County), number 10 (Vejle County, Skanderborg County and parts of Ribe County), number 11 (the remaining parts of Ribe County and parts of Ringkøbing County) and number 12 (the Faroe Islands) were up for election.

== Results ==
Party	Seats			
Party	Won	Not up	Total	+/–
Højre	6	23	29	–13
Venstre Reform Party	10	11	21	+8
Free Conservatives	7	3	10	New
Moderate Venstre	3	0	3	–4
Social Democratic Party	0	1	1	–1
Other parties	1	1	2	+2
Total	27	39	66	0
Source: Bang
