= 1953 Danish Landsting election =

Landsting elections were held in Denmark in April 1953 alongside elections to the Folketing. They were the last elections to the upper house of the Rigsdagen, as the Landsting was abolished later in the year following the introduction of a new constitution approved in a June referendum, with the Folketing (previously the lower house) becoming a unicameral parliament.

== Background ==
Although the new constitution had been approved by the Rigsdagen, the previous constitution required elections to be called for a new Rigsdagen which would approve the new constitution again before it could be signed by the monarch and come into force.

== Electoral system ==
The elections took place in two rounds, with the public electing 4,335 members of an electoral college on 21 April, who in turn elected the members of the Landsting on 28 April.

== Results ==
Party	Votes	%	Electors	Seats			
Party	Votes	%	Electors	People's	Parliament	Total	+/–
Social Democratic Party	639,656	40.08	1,789	24	9	33	0
Venstre	366,268	22.95	1,093	16	3	22	0
Conservative People's Party	286,638	17.96	767	10	3	13	+1
Danish Social Liberal Party	141,121	8.84	349	5	1	6	0
Justice Party of Denmark	79,036	4.95	175	1	0	1	0
Communist Party of Denmark	69,928	4.38	141	0	0	0	–1
Schleswig Party	7,447	0.47	21	0	0	0	New
Danish Unity	5,944	0.37	0	0	0	0	0
Faroese representative			–	0	0	1	0
Total	1,596,038	100.00	4,335	56	16	76	0
Source: Statistiske efterretninger (votes)

== Aftermath ==
The constitution was adopted unchanged by the both houses of parliament and then approved by the public in a referendum on 28 May. It was signed by King Frederik IX on 5 June and entered into force immediately. The Landsting continued to existed until the general elections to the newly unicameral Folketing on 22 September 1953.
