= Free Conservatives =

Defunct Danish political party

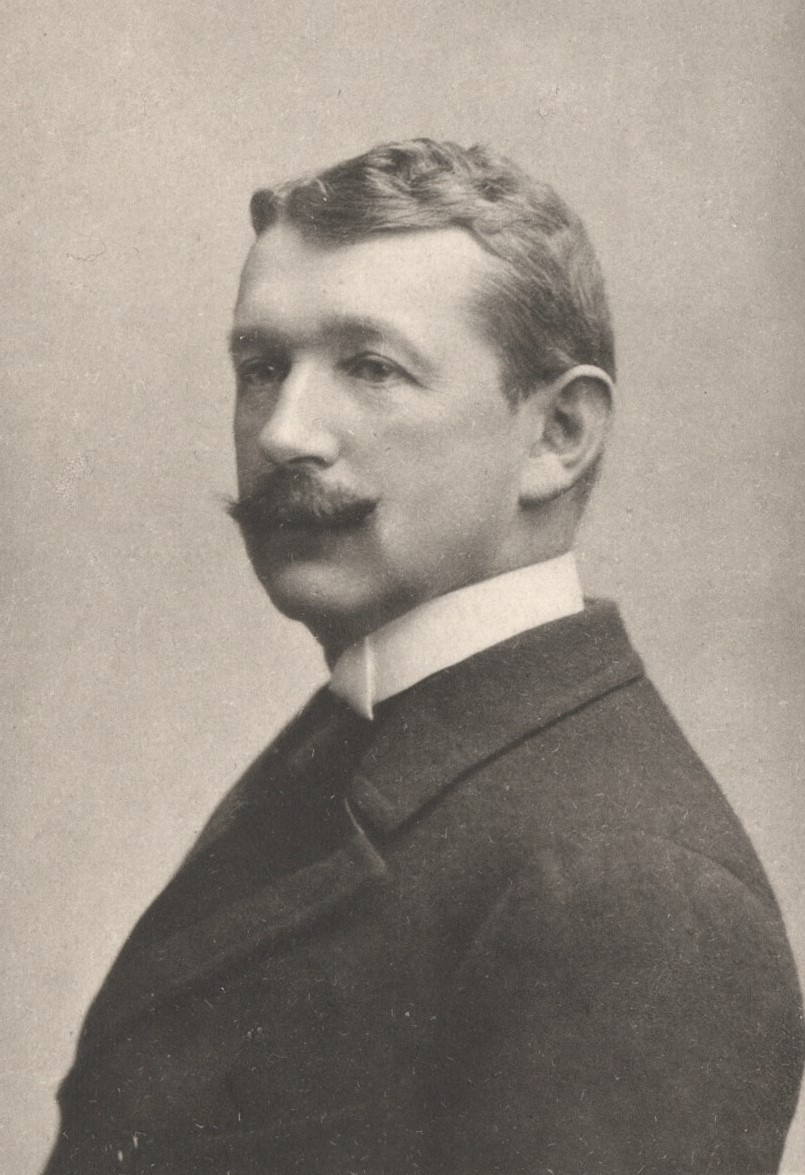
Party leader and MP Mogens Frijs. Credit: Jens Petersen/Det Kongelige Bibliotek

The Free Conservatives (Danish: De Frikonservative) was a political party in Denmark, with significant influence in the political life of the country in the early 20th century, especially during the J. C. Christensen cabinet. The main leader of the party was Count Mogens Frijs-Frijsenborg. Other prominent figures were Tage Reedtz-Thott, Hans Nicolai Hansen and Christian Michael Rottbøll. The party opposed socialism but it founders could not reconcile with the political line of the main conservative party Højre under the leadership of Jacob Estrup. The Free Conservatives worked for unity between Folketinget and Landstinget.

== Founding ==
The founders of the Free Conservatives, originally eight Landsting members from Højre, had tried to forge unity between the moderate sectors of Højre and Venstre around a new tax reform. The plans of a new unified party failed, and 'the eight' came to function as a separate faction. The tax reform proposal, which 'the eight' and Venstre had agreed upon, was adopted by Folketinget in 1900. However, in Landstinget Højre launched a counterproposal. As a result, 'the eight' broke away from Højre and formed a separate party with nine Landsting members. Informally, the name of the new party was 'the Free Conservatives'. The name was formally adopted by the party in 1902.

== Relations with Venstre ==
Between 1901 and 1912, the Free Conservatives had considerable influence over the policies of the Venstre governments. The party was able to bar universal suffrage to be introduced in the amt council elections. The party was also participant in the fall of Peter Adler Alberti in 1908. However, in 1912 Venstre presented a proposal for a democratic constitution for Denmark. This caused a split between Venstre and the Free Conservatives. After the new constitution was introduced in 1915, the Free Conservatives reunified with Højre, forming the Conservative People's Party. Internal disagreements in the Conservative People's Party resulted in the Free Conservatives being restored in 1917 but they lost their last seat in Landstinget in 1920.

=== Landstinget ===
Election	Votes	%	Seats	+/-	Government
1902	?	? (#?)	10 / 66	▲7	Coalition
1906	?	? (#?)	10 / 66	+	Coalition
1910	?	? (#?)	5 / 66	▼5	Coalition
1914	?	? (#?)	5 / 66	0	Coalition
1915	?	? (#?)	5 / 66	0	Coalition
