= Nina Bang =

Danish politician and historian

Mag.Art. Nina Bang
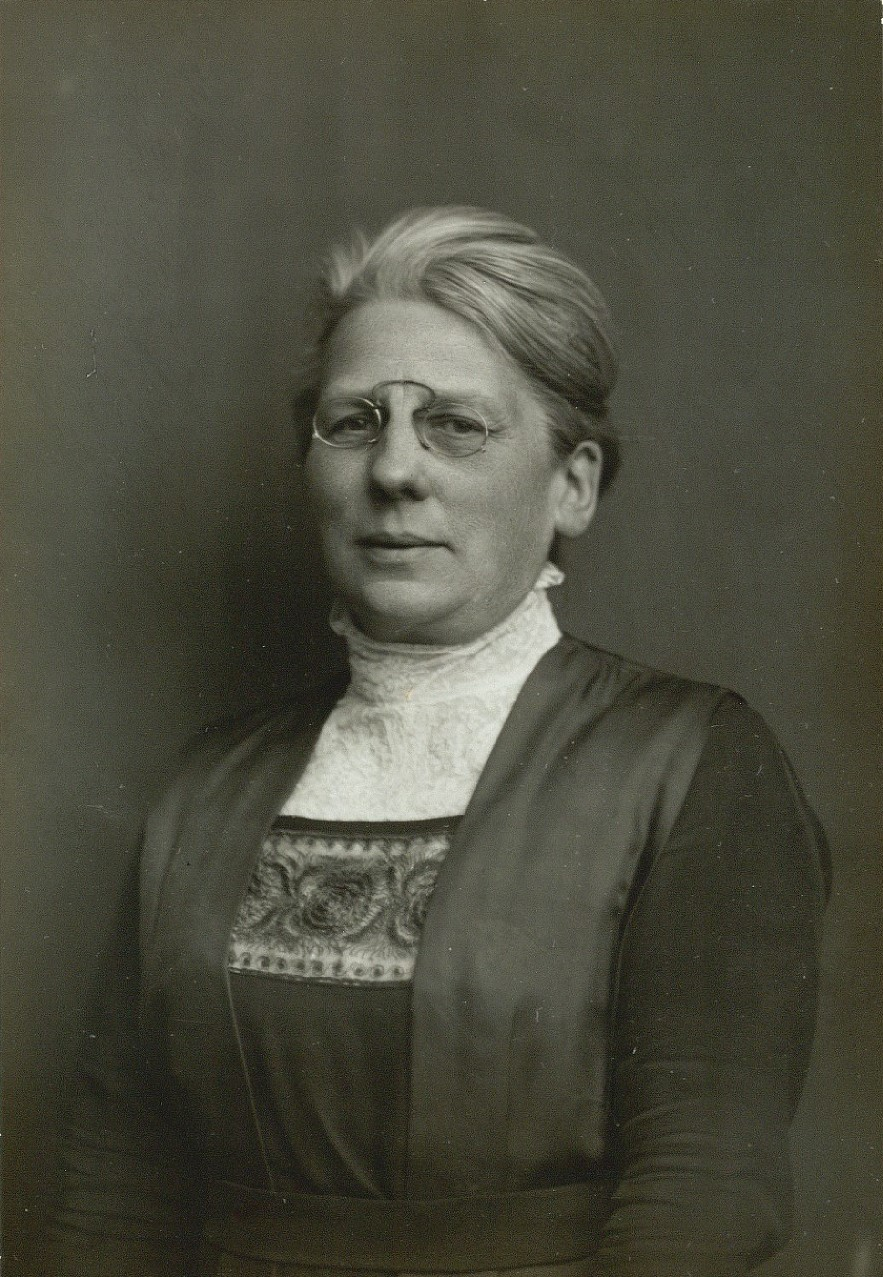

Minister of Education
- In office 23 April 1924 – 14 December 1926
- Prime Minister: Thorvald Stauning
- Preceded by: Jacob Appel
- Succeeded by: Jens Byskov

Personal details
- Born: Nina Henriette Wendeline Ellinger; 6 October 1866 Kastellet, Copenhagen, Denmark
- Died: 25 March 1928 (aged 61) Copenhagen, Denmark
- Resting place: Bispebjerg Cemetery
- Party: Social Democrats
- Spouse: Gustav Bang (m. 1895; died 1915)
- Children: Merete
- Parent(s): Heinrich August David Ellinger; Charlotte Ida Friedericke Preuss
- Relatives: H.O.G. Ellinger
- Education: University of Copenhagen
- Profession: Historian
- Cabinet: Stauning I

Nina Henriette Wendeline Bang née Ellinger (6 October 1866 – 25 March 1928) was a Danish social democratic politician and historian. In 1924 she was appointed Minister for Education, becoming one of the world's first female ministers. She resigned as minister in 1926.

== Biography ==
Bang was born and died in Copenhagen. She grew up in a right-wing middle-class family, but unlike her brother the politician and physicist Heinrich Oscar Günther Ellinger, who became a member of the Landsting for the conservative party Højre, she became a marxist while studying history at the University of Copenhagen in the 1890s. When she graduated in 1894, she became one of the first women in Denmark to get an academic degree. She had specialized in 16th-century trade and in particular the extensive records in the possession of the Danish National Archives on the Sound toll collected at Kronborg Castle from the 1420s until 1857. Bang saw the records of the ships that passed through Oresund and the type and value of their cargo throughout centuries as unique historical documents to the economic history of England, the Netherlands, the Hanseatic League and the Baltic states. Analyzing the large amount of documents was a huge project, and she published the first two volumes of Tabeller over Skibsfart og Varetransport gennem Øresund (English: Tables of Shipping and Transport of Goods through the Sound) in 1906 and 1922. The project produced seven volumes in all, but Bang was responsible only for the first two.

Bang's political career began in 1903 when she became a member of the executive committee of the Social Democratic Party, where she was the only woman until the arrival of Marie Nielsen in 1918: only three women had previously been members. In the 1918 Landsting election—the first under the Constitution of 1915 which enfranchised women—she was elected to the Landsting, and she remained a member until her death in 1928. She was a member of the finance committee of the Landsting, and she participated in several international socialist conventions as a substitute for Thorvald Stauning.

When Prime Minister Thorvald Stauning established his first government—the first Danish social democratic government, the Cabinet of Stauning I—in 1924, Bang was appointed Minister for Education, which made her the first female minister in Denmark and one of the first in the world. Bang's primary ambitions as minister was to democratize the school system and to improve the teacher training. Despite being the first woman to reach the top of the political system in Denmark, Bang never engaged in the women's movement but considered the situation of women a part of the regular political struggle, and criticised the right-wing women's movement for obscuring differences between the classes of society.

Bang stirred up quite a commotion when at the 50th anniversary of the new building for the Royal Danish Theatre in 1924, she forbade the playing of the overture to Elves' Hill and thus the royal anthem Kong Kristian. When a group of students sang the anthem anyway, addressing it directly to King Christian X, she refused to stand up as tradition dictated and as the entire audience did. Some of the other ministers had trouble deciding whether to sit or stand, but only Bang remained fully seated. As a politician, she was uncompromising and aggressive, characteristics that earned her the nicknames "Our Lady of Denmark" and "the only real man in the government".

When Stauning's government resigned in 1926, Bang continued as a member of the Landsting, but due to illness her activity was limited. She died in 1928.

== Posthumous honours ==
- Nina Bang Bjerg, a mountain in Greenland, was named after her.
- Nina Bang award, awarded annually to a young, promising female politician.

Political offices
Preceded by Jacob Christian Lindberg Appel	Education Minister of Denmark; 23 April 1924 – 14 December 1926	Succeeded by Jens Byskov
