= Marie Hjelmer =

Danish women's rights activist

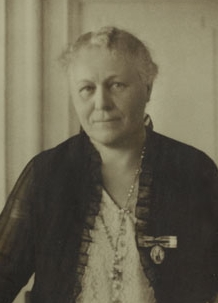
Marie Hjelmer

Fanny Marie Annette Hjelmer born Raaschou (1869–1937) was a Danish women's rights activist and politician. In 1918, she became one of the first five women to be elected to the Landsting. She joined the Danish Women's Society in 1922, became a board member in 1925 and served as president from 1931 to 1936.

== Biography ==
Born on 20 April 1869 in Bjerring, Fanny Marie Annette Raaschou was the daughter of Niels Peter Raaschou (1823–1890), a parish priest, and Fanny Eline Annette Grundtvig (1841–1879). She was brought up in her father's rectory, first in Bjerringbroegnen and later in Espe near Ringe on the island of Funen.

As the oldest child, on her mother's death in 1879, she had to take care of her five siblings from the age of 10. After qualifying as a teacher at Marie Kruse's School in Copenhagen, she went on to study French in Paris (1894). On returning to Denmark, she became a private tutor until her marriage in 1898 to Carl Frederik Hjelmer, a high-ranking police official, with whom she had three children.

While raising her children, she assisted her father by working in the municipal offices in Præstø, gaining insights into local politics. In 1907, she met Elna Munch, a women's rights activist. As a result, in 1907 she joined the Præstø's Women's Suffrage Society (Kvindevalgretsforening) where she became the most active member. In 1909, the year women were first authorized to participate in local elections, she succeeded in being elected to represent the Social Liberal Party on the Council for Præstø Municipality. She was re-elected until 1919 when her husband was transferred to Ringsted.

In 1915, she became a member of the Danish Women's Society, first at the local level in Præstø and in Ringsted which she co-founded and chaired from 1922 to 1936. Encouraged by her political colleagues, in 1918 she was one of five women elected to the Landsting, the only female representative of the Social Liberals. She remained there for 18 years, supporting in particular improved conditions for women and children. She was also active at the international level, representing Denmark at the first conference of the International Labour Organization, held in Washington D.C. in 1919.

In 1925, she became a board member of the Danish Women's Society, serving as president from 1931 to 1936. At a time when the organization was experiencing serious difficulties, she managed to reconcile the varying views of the younger and older members, paving the way for Edel Saunte to become president in 1936. She also contributed to the political image of the organization, contributing articles to Kvinden og Samfundet.

After experiencing serious health problems during her last year, Marie Hjelmer died on 5 January 1937 in Ringsted.
