= Rigsdagen =

National legislature of Denmark from 1849 to 1953

- Denmark

Type
- Type: Bicameral
- Houses: Folketing; Landsting

History
- Founded: 5 June 1849
- Disbanded: 5 June 1953
- Succeeded by: Folketing
- Seats: 225 voting members: 76 Landsting; 149 Folketing

Elections
- First Landsting election: 1849 Danish Landsting election
- First Folketing election: 1849 Danish Folketing election
- Last Landsting election: 1953 Danish Landsting election
- Last Folketing election: 1953 Danish Folketing election

Meeting place
- Copenhagen, Denmark

The Rigsdag (Danish: Rigsdagen [ˈʁisˌd̥æˀən]) was the name of the national legislature of Denmark from 1849 to 1953.

The Rigsdag was Denmark's first parliament, and it was incorporated in the Constitution of 1849. It was a bicameral legislature, consisting of two houses, the Folketing and the Landsting. The distinction between the two houses was not always clear, as they had equal power. In 1953, a new constitution was approved by referendum and adopted, with the result that the Rigsdag and the Landsting were eliminated in favor of a unicameral legislature under the name of the Folketing. The Rigsdag, like today's Folketing, sat in Christiansborg Palace in the centre of Copenhagen.

Membership in the Rigsdag was limited to certain sectors of society – women were not allowed to join, and neither were about a quarter of all men over 30, mostly due to their condition as servants or welfare recipients.

The name is a cognate of the names of several legislatures in other Germanic countries, such as the Reichstag in Germany, the Riksdag in Sweden, or the Riksdag in Finland. (For a discussion of the traditional Germanic councils that gave root to bodies such as these, see the article on ting-style councils.)

== See also ==
- Folketing
- Ting
- Danish politics
- Government of Denmark
