= Landsting (Denmark) =

Historic upper house of the Parliament of Denmark

Type
- Type: Bicameralism

History
- Founded: 5 June 1849
- Disbanded: 5 June 1953

Leadership
- Speaker of the Landsting: See list

Structure
- Seats: 76
- Political groups: Last Government (35): Venstre – Liberal Party (22); Conservative People's Party (13); Supported by (1): Justice Party of Denmark (1); Opposition (39): Social Democrats (33); Radikale Venstre – Social Liberal Party (6); Faroe Islands: Independent (1)
- Length of term: 8 years

Elections
- Voting system: Indirect voting
- First election: 1849 Danish Landsting election (da)
- Last election: 1953 Danish Landsting election (da)

The Landsting (Danish: Landstinget) was the upper house of the Rigsdag, from 1849 until 1953, when the bicameral system was abolished in favour of unicameralism. The Landsting had powers equal to the Folketing, which made the two houses of parliament hard to distinguish.

Originally, membership and the electorate was restricted, and the members were largely conservatives. Membership of the house was then restricted to certain sectors of society: only men with a certain net worth could hold a seat. In 1915, these restrictions were removed, and a few new members were appointed by the existing members.

== Etymology and earlier use ==
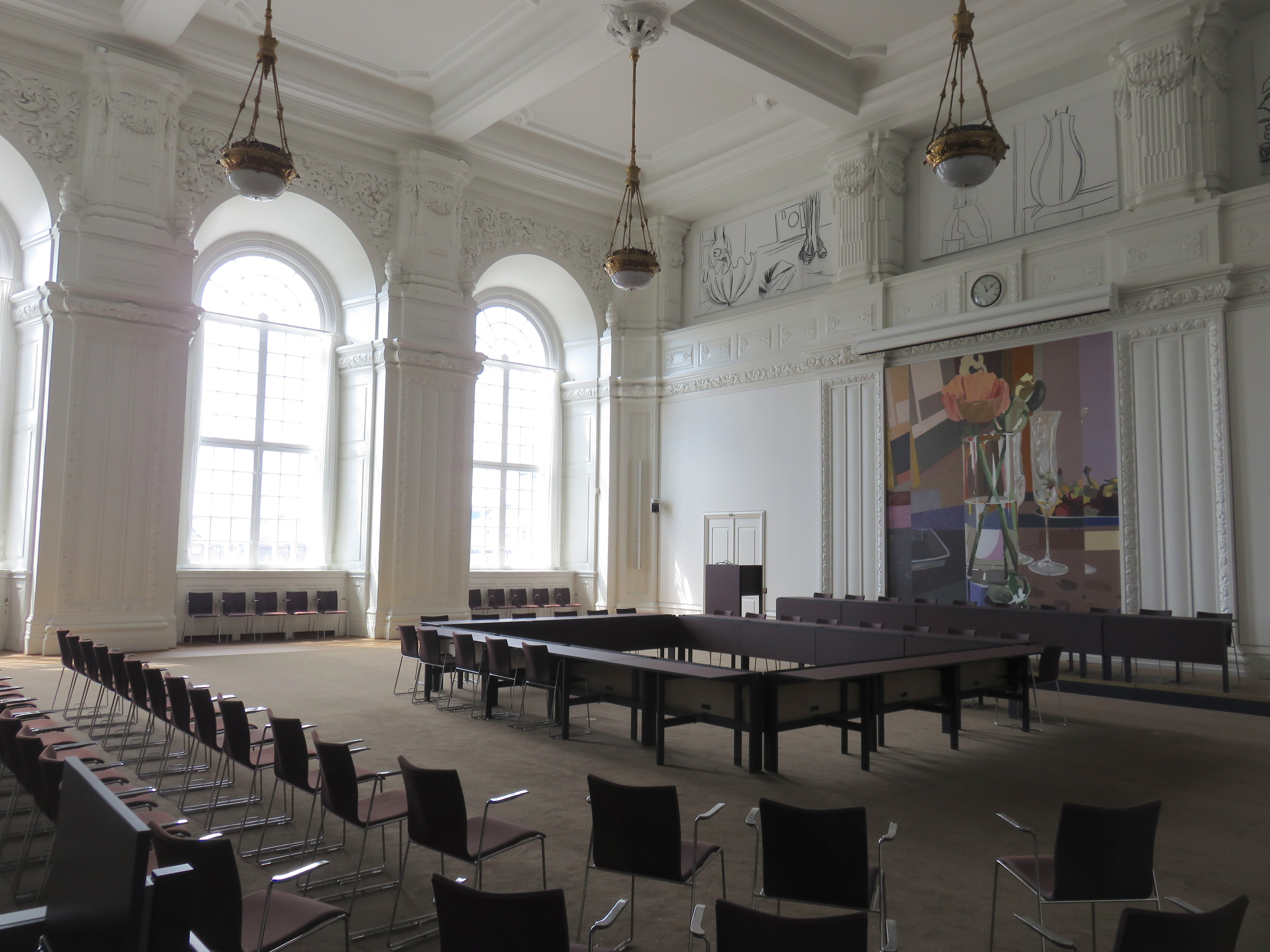
The former Landsting chamber in Christiansborg Palace in 2018.

Ting (old Norse: þing) means assembly. It first came into being during Viking times and was formed by the freemen of the community, and it generally numbered about a hundred men. Tings were necessary in the clan-based society of Northern Germany and Scandinavia, because they allowed for inter-clan wars to be resolved or prevented through the mediation of the ting. It also served as the place for religious rites and trade negotiations.

The Landsting is also the Danish name for the modern Parliament of Greenland.

== History ==
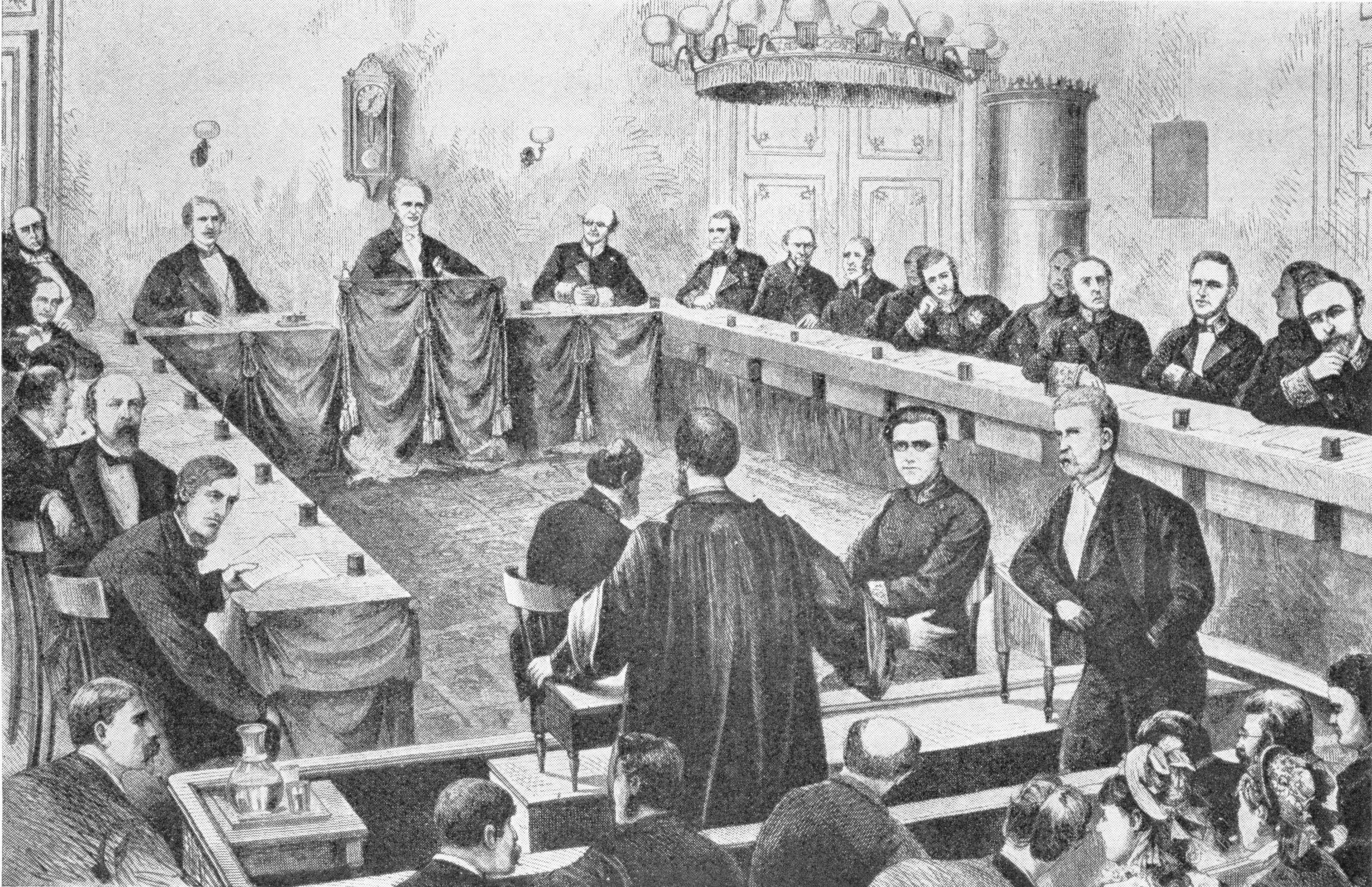
The Danish Court of Impeachment, Rigsretten, during a session in the Landsting Chamber, Christiansborg Palace, 1877.

Under the Constitution of 1849, the requirements for the right to vote was the same for the two houses, however the requirements for electability were stricter for the Landsting; candidates were limited to those of age 40 and above and they were required to have a substantial income. The house originally had 51 members, all elected indirectly. The voters elected a group of electors for each constituency, and the electors elected the members of the house. The members were elected for a term of eight years; however, terms were staggered so that half of the seats were up for election every four years.

With the Constitution of 1866, the electoral system was reformed. The number of members was increased to 66, of whom 12 were appointed by the king for a period of twelve years, and one by the Faroese Løgting. The remaining 53 were elected indirectly.

In Copenhagen, half the electors were elected by the voters paying the largest amount of tax, and the other half by all the voters. In the rest of the country, one elector was elected by the voters in each parish in the countryside and half as many electors were elected in the market towns by the same system as in Copenhagen. Then for each elector elected in the parishes and the market towns, one elector was found among those that paid the greatest amount of tax in the parishes. As the main direct tax of the time was based on real estate and its value as farmland, this system greatly favoured manor owners. The result was a conservative majority lasting 35 years, until the 1902 election.

The next reform of the electoral system came with the Constitution of 1915, and the first election under this system was the 1918 election. Women were given the right to vote, the number of seats was increased to 72, the number of constituencies was reduced to seven, and the system of royally appointed members was replaced by 18 members elected by the resigning Landsting for a period of eight years. The same year, Inger Gautier Schmit, along with Nina Bang, Marie Christensen, Marie Hjelmer and Olga Knudsen, were the first women elected to the Landsting.

Although a 1939 referendum would have replaced the Landsting with another chamber—the Rigsting—and simplified the legislative process, this failed due to a low voter turnout, and the bicameral system survived. It was not until 1953, following the approval of the current constitution in a referendum held that year, that the Landsting was finally abolished.

== See also ==
- Danish politics
- Government of Denmark
  - Government of the Faroe Islands
  - Government of Greenland
- List of speakers of the Folketing (1850-)
- Ting
