= Christine's Picture Book =

1859 scrapbook by Hans Christian Andersen

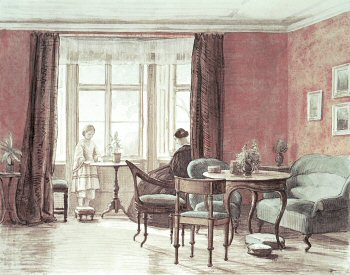
Christine Stampe as a child reading to her mother, Jonna, in the living room at Christinelund.

Christine's Picture Book (Danish: Christines Billedbog) is one of three famous scrapbooks created in part by the Danish author Hans Christian Andersen.

== Biography ==
Hans Christian Andersen was a friend of the Danish Baron Henrik Stampe (b. 1821) and his wife Jonna Drewsen (b. 1827), as well as of Jonna's father, Adolph Drewson. He became godfather to their daughter Christine (30 October 1856 – 9 March 1884), who had been named for her paternal grandmother Christine Stampe (née Dalgas).

Together, Andersen and Adolph Drewsen compiled a scrapbook for Christine's third birthday in 1859. Its 122 pages contain over 1,000 pasted-in pictures, in some cases accompanied by hand-written captions or poems. There are also a few paper cuts, an art form at which Andersen was adept. The images were collected from all kinds of European publications, and the result offers a unique pictorial snapshot of European culture of the 1850s. Similar books exist for Christine's sisters Astrid, who became a women's rights activist, and Rigmor, who married the composer Victor Bendix.

== Publication ==
Inspired by the book, Christine's granddaughter-in-law Countess Alette Bardenfleth set up a foundation to support projects related to Danish history, literature, language, and music. The foundation published Danish, English, German, and Italian editions of Christine's Picture Book in 1984; a Swedish edition appeared the following year. A documentary of the same title was made for Danish television in 1985.

The book is now in the collection of the Silkeborg Kunstmuseum, which worked with the Royal Library of Copenhagen to create a digital edition of Christine’s Picture Book in 2005.
