= Christinelund =

Manor house near Præstø, Denmark

- Interactive map of the Christinelund area

General information
- Location: Christinelundsvej 36; 4720 Præstø, Denmark
- Coordinates: 55°7′8″N 12°4′30″E
- Completed: 1860

Design and construction
- Architect: Ferdinand Meldahl

Christinelund, originally a farm under Nysø Manor, is located a few kilometres east of central Præstø, on the island of Zealand's Jungshoved peninsula, in Vordingborg Municipality in southeastern Denmark. It takes its name from the salonist Christine Stampe and was frequently visited by Hans Christian Andersen in the 1850s, when it was the home of Henrik and Jonna Stampe. The current main building was completed in 1860 to a design by the architect Ferdinand Meldahl. It was listed on the Danish registry of protected buildings and places by the Danish Heritage Agency on 23 February 1978. The property is now operated as a bed and breakfast.

== History ==
=== Origins ===
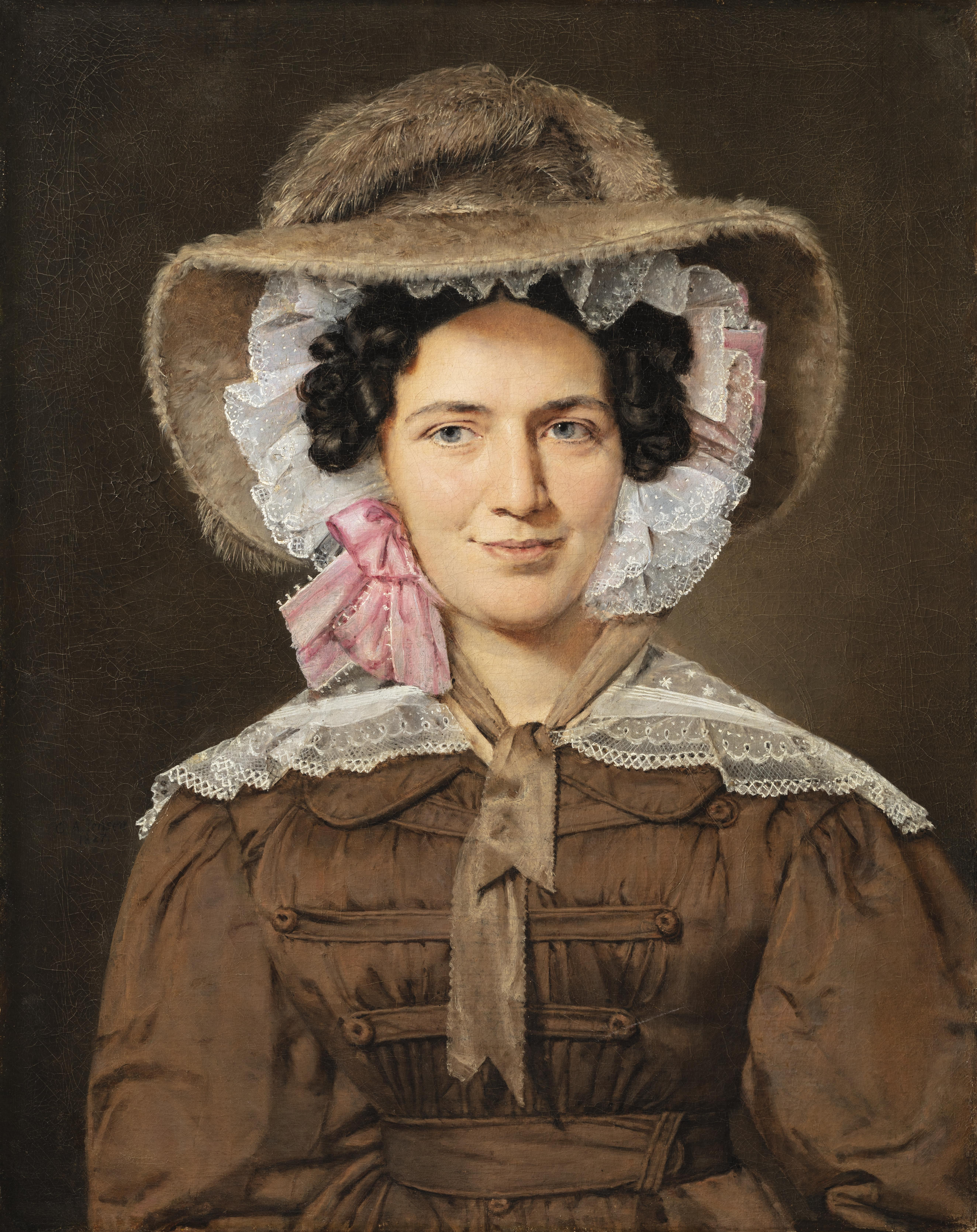
Christine Stampe for whom the property was named, painted by C. A. Jensen in 1827

Nysø Manor was acquired by Holger Stampe in 1800 and became part of the Barony of Stampenborg in 1809. His son Henrik Stampe took up residence at one of the farms under the manor after his marriage to Christine Marguérite Salome Dalgas in 1820, renaming the property after his wife. Their two sons, Henrik and Holger, were born on the property in 1821 and 1822. Henrik and Christine Stampe took over Nysø in 1826.

=== The new house: Henrik and Jonna Stampe ===
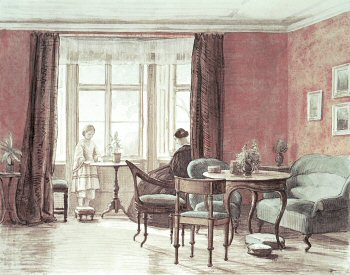
Watercolour by P. C. Skovgaard: The livingroom at Christinelund: Kristine is reading to her mother Jonna Stampe née Drewsen

Henrik and Christine Stampe's son Henrik initially studied law in Copenhagen but ran Christinelund after his marriage to Jonna Drewsen in 1850. The prominent architect Ferdinand Meldahl was commissioned to build the current main building in 1859–1860. Henrik and Jonna Stampe had four daughters: Rigmor, Astrid, Kristine, and Jeanina Emilie. Hans Christian Andersen created three "picture books" for the three oldest daughters (cf. Christine's Picture Book).

Rigmor Stampe broke out of her noble environment when she married the Jewish composer Victor Bendix in 1879. He belonged to Georg Brandes' social circle. Astrid Stampe became a leading member of the Danish Women's Society in the 1880s. She also broke with her noble background, marrying Gustav Feddersen. Kristine Stampe died when she was just 27 years old in 1884. The youngest sister, Jeanina Emilie Stampe, married Frederik de Jonquières who was prefect (amtmand) of Funen County.

=== Later history ===
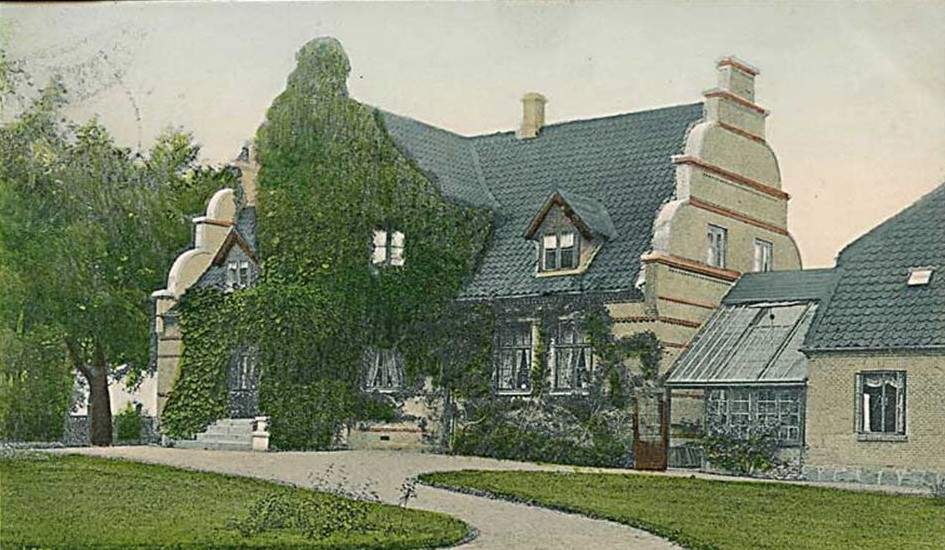
Christinelund in c. 1900

The barony of Stampenborg, comprising Nysø Manor, Christinelund and several other farms, was passed on to Henrik Stampe when his father died in 1876. Christinelund was then used as a retirement home for his mother. The barony was passed on to Henrik Stampe's brother when he died without male heirs in 1892. Holger Stampe owned it until his death in 1904.

== Architecture ==
The south-facing main building is built to a Historicist design with inspiration from Renaissance architecture. It has Dutch gables and many ornamental details. It consists of two storeys (including the fully used attic) over a cellar and rests on a black-painted stone foundation. The blue-glazed tile roof is broken up by a series of dormers. The building originally stood in blank red and yellow bricks but has now been painted white. The western gable has a bay window and on the south side of the building is a tower-like, two-storey avant-corps. A single-storey side wing extends from the rear side of the building. To the east of the main wing is a one-storey building which originally contained residences for the chauffeur and estate manager.

To the south of the main building is a large park. A courtyard and various farm buildings are situated to the north of the main wing.

== Today ==
The buildings and 13.2 hectares (33 acres) of land are today owned by Jan Grønhøj. The estate is operated as a bed and breakfast.

== List of owners ==
- (1858–1876) Henrik Stampe
- (1876–1892) Henrik Stampe
- ( 1892–1904) Holger Stampe-Charisius
- (1904–1925) Henrik Stampe
- (1925–1934) Myrle Stampe (née Harvey)
- (1934–1960) Birgitte Henriksdatter Holst née Stampe
- (1960–1990) Peter Henrik Stampe Holst
- (1990–1999) Peter Henrik Stampe Holst/Marianne Stampe Holst née Themsen
- (1999–2010) Peter Henrik Stampe Holst/Marianne Stampe Holst née Themsen (only the land)
- (1999–2006) D. S. I. Christinelund (main building and breeding farm)
- (2006–) Jan Grønhøj (main building, outbuildings and service buildings) and 13.2 hectares (33 acres)
- (2010–) Marianne Stampe Holst née Themsen (only the land)
