= Bertel Thorvaldsen with the Statue of Hope =

Self-portrait by Danish sculptor Bertel Thorvaldsen

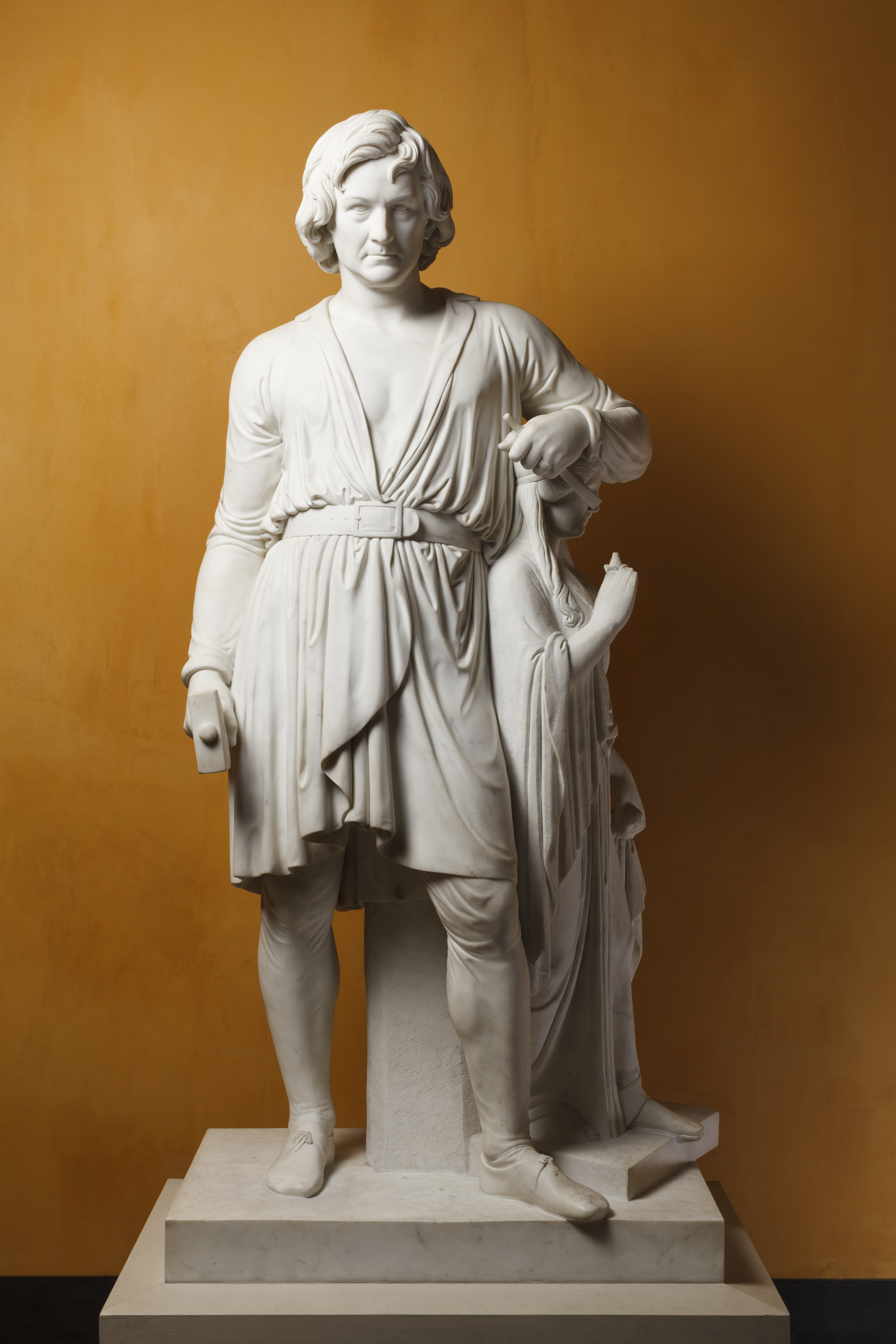
- Artist: Bertel Thorvaldsen
- Year: 1839 (marble, 1959)
- Type: Marble
- Dimensions: 198 cm (78 in)
- Location: Thorvaldsen Museum; Copenhagen

Bertel Thorvaldsen with the Statue of Hope is a self-portrait by Danish sculptor Bertel Thorvaldsen, created as a plaster model in his studio at Nysø Manor in 1839 and executed in marble posthumously by Herman Wilhelm Bissen in 1859. In 1894, a bronze cast was erected in Central Park, New York City. Bissen's marble sculpture is on display in the Thorvaldsen Museum in Copenhagen.

== Description ==
Thorvaldsen has depicted himself as a fairly young man in a work situation, dressed in a workman's robe and with mallet and chisel in his hands, resting his left arm on a somewhat down-scaled representation of his 1817 statue of Hope.

The hammer in Thorvaldsen's right hand may be a reference to the Norse god Thor. When Thorvaldsen the same year had been awarded Knight of the Great Cross in the Order of the Dannebrog, he had also included a Thor figure in his first sketches for a coat of arms (for Frederiksborg Castle). Over the last decades, he had on the other hand shown a remarkable unwillingness, in spite of prevailing trends of his time and numerous endorsements, to include subject matter from Norse mythology in his work.

== History ==
The original plaster model for the sculpture was created by Thorvaldsen in 1839 in his studio at Nysø Manor. In her Thorvaldsen memoirs, Christine Stampe makes the following comment on the creation of the statue:

While working on his self-portrait, for which I had made him a sort of robe to his own design, he first fastened the belt—which was with a large buckle–and said: "Now I will get strong, that is what happened to Thor when he used his strength; they cal me Thor. one Thor crushes, the other Thor creates".

The plaster model was created on 1 October 1839. At the time of Thorvaldsen's death a few years later, he had still not executed it in marble. A marble version of the sculpture was created by his pupil Herman Wilhelm Bissen in 1859.

== New York bronze sculpture ==
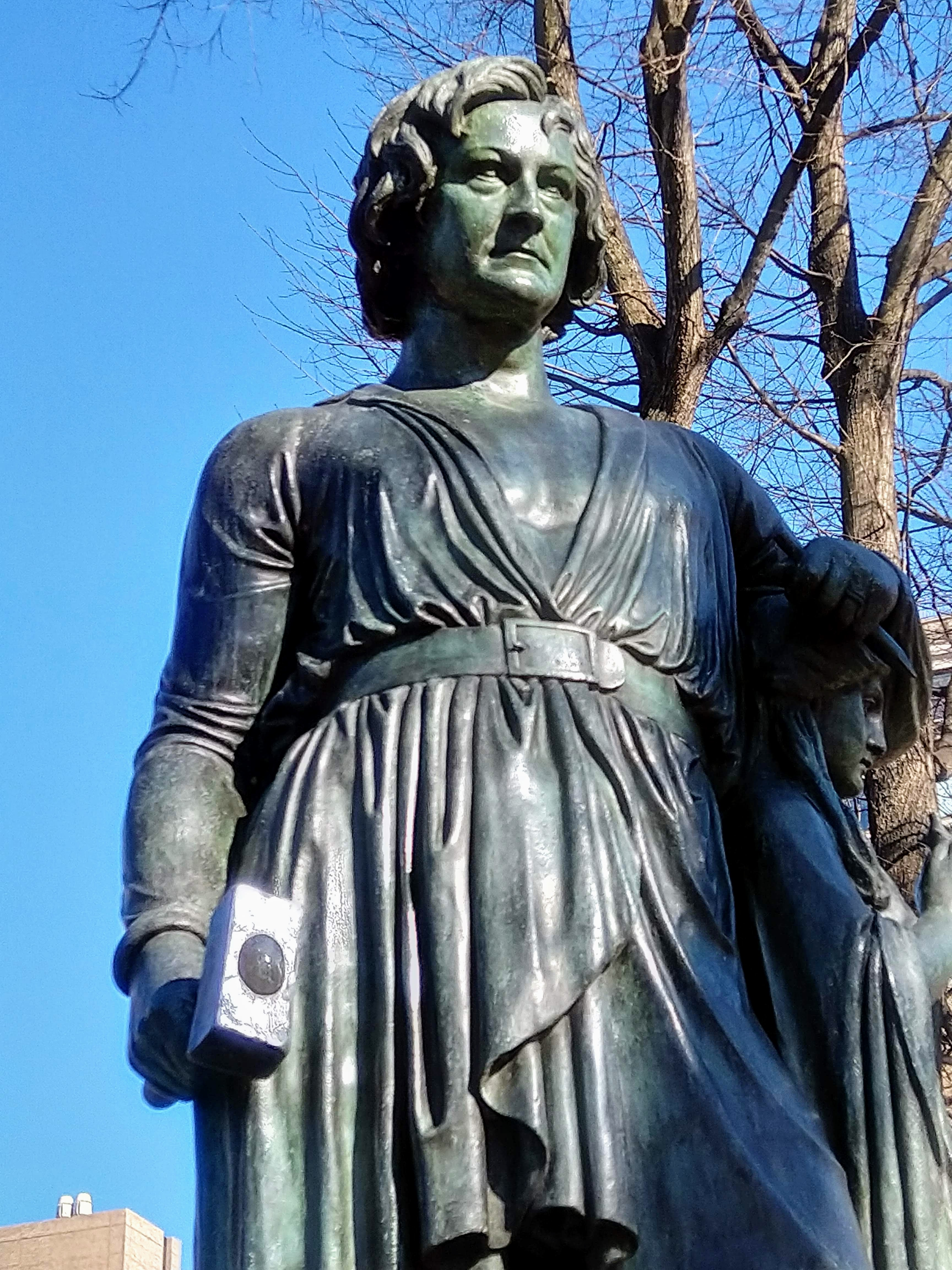
The Thorvaldsen statue in New York.

A bronze copy of the sculpture was in the 1890s presented to New York City by Americans of Danish descent. The bronze cast was created in Copenhagen in 1892. The monument was unveiled at a site just north of 59th Street, between 6th and 7th Avenues. Some time later it was moved to a site near 97th Street (near Fifth Avenue) . In 1940, it was once again repositioned in connection with the construction of the 97th street transverse. In 1996 the Central Park Conservancy undertook a renovation of the monument. The plinth features Thorvaldsen's reliefs of Day and Night.

== Depictions ==
The sculpture is depicted on the front side of Harald Conradsen's 1849 commemorative Thorvaldsen medal. It has also been depicted on a Danish 25 øre stamp (1938).

== Gallery ==
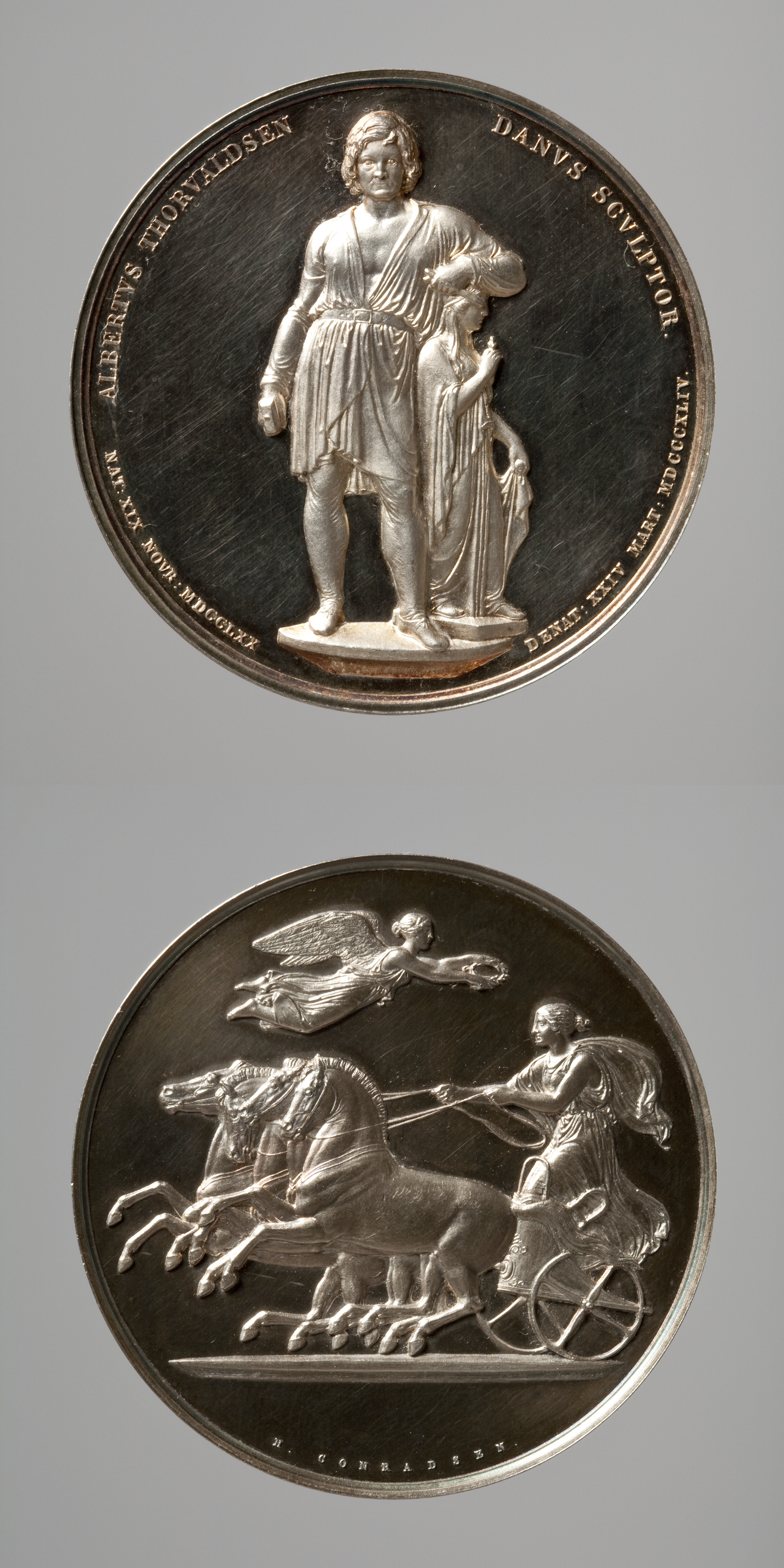
1849 medal

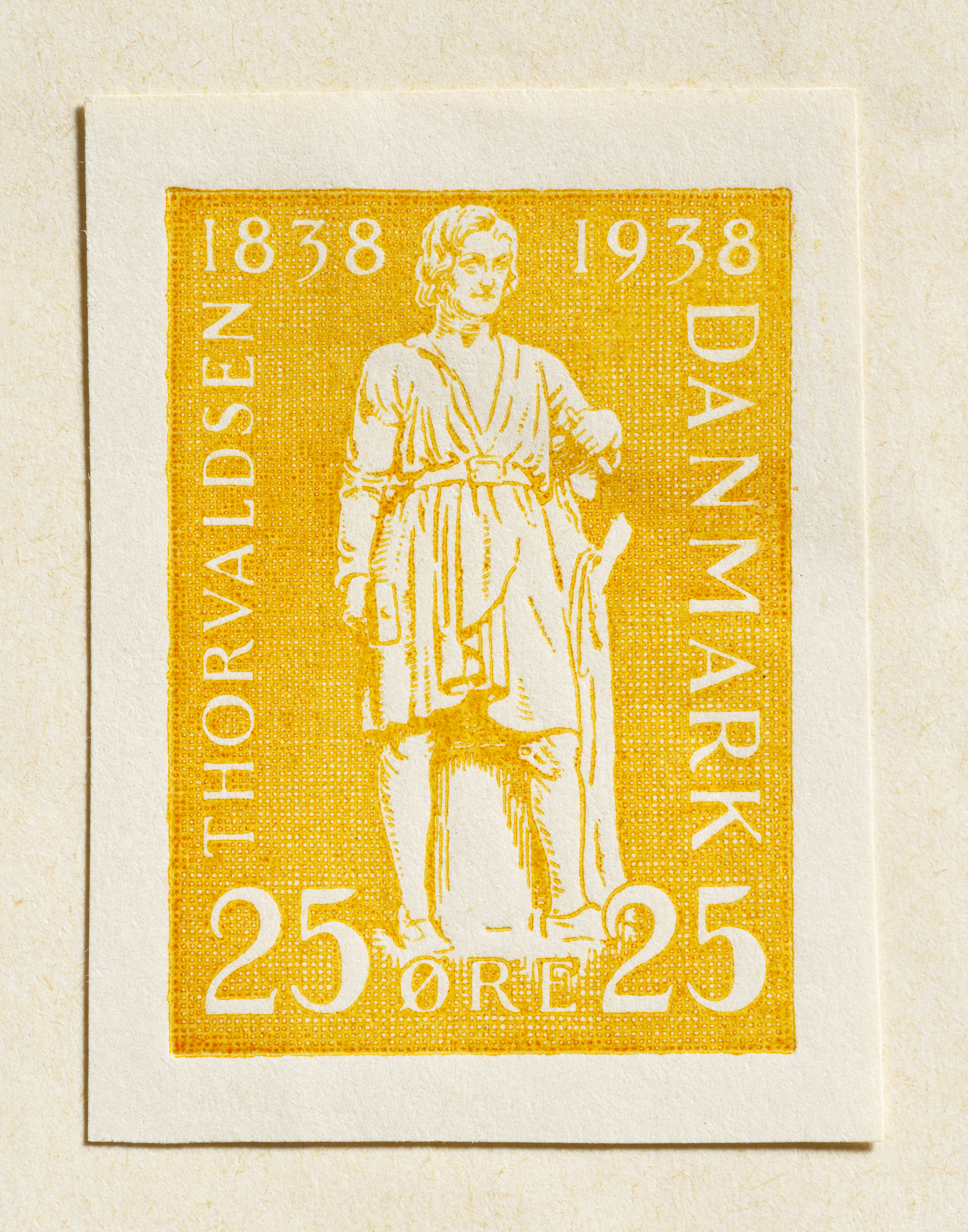
1938 stamp
