= Niels Christian Kierkegaard =

Danish draftsman and lithographer

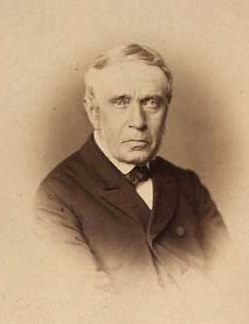
Portrait of Niels Christian Kierkegaard by Budtz Müller, 1882

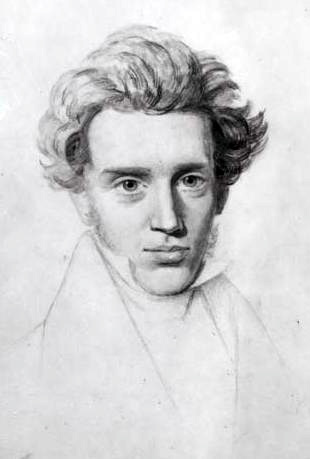
Unfinished Sketch of Søren Kierkegaard by Niels Christian Kierkegaard, Royal Library, Denmark, c. 1840

Niels Christian Kierkegaard (24 September 1806 – 14 August 1882) was a Danish draftsman and lithographer.

== Biography ==
Kierkegaard was born in Copenhagen, Denmark. He was the son of Anders Andersen Kierkegaard and Karen Jørgensen and was a second cousin of the philosopher Søren Kierkegaard. He attended the Royal Danish Academy of Fine Arts in 1821 through 1832. In 1827 he was a student of Johan Ludwig Lund (1777–1867) and Heinrich Buntzen (1803–1892).

Kierkegaard was employed as a drawing teacher at the Royal Academy and at private schools during the years 1833–1861. He exhibited some of his works at the Charlottenborg Spring Exhibition in 1830–1832, 1834 and 1841. After that he focused on his teaching and less on his own works. Kierkegaard typically signed his works C.K. He died unmarried in Copenhagen and was buried at Assistens Cemetery.
