= Rigmor Stampe Bendix =

Danish baroness, writer and philanthropist

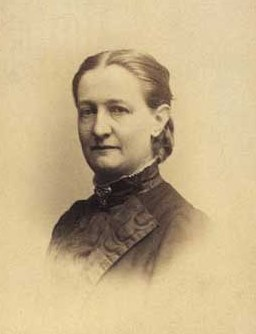
Rigmor Stampe Bendix (1890s)

Rigmor Stampe Bendix (1850–1923) was a Danish baroness, writer and philanthropist. In 1898, she became editor of Kvindernes Blad (Women's Paper), a supplement to various daily newspapers, developing it as an organ for the women's movement. She is remembered in Denmark for her biographies of the sculptor Bertel Thorvaldsen, Baronesse Stampes Erindringer om Thorvaldsen (1912) and of her godfather Hans Christian Andersen, H.C. Andersen og hans nærmeste Omgang (1918).

== Early life and education ==
Born at Christinelund near Præstø on 7 December 1850, Rigmor Stampe was the daughter of Baron Henrik Stampe (1821–1892) and Jonna Drewson. Brought up there with her two younger sisters, Astrid and Kristine, she strove to bring social enlightenment to the local country people. After her father acquired Nysø Manor in 1876, she lived there from 1877 to 1879 and built a library for the use of her daughters and the local population.

In 1879, with her marriage to the Jewish composer Victor Emanuel Bendix, she broke away from the family's cultural radicalism inspired by Georg Brandes. While her mother treated Rigmor's atheism as heresy, her father learnt to accept his Jewish son-in-law. Following her father's death in 1892, Nysø was run by her uncle Holger Stampe-Charisius, a prominent Roman Catholic. Together with her sisters, Rigmor enjoyed a free upbringing, reading intensively and being educated by private tutors. She later went to Copenhagen where she was tutored in ethics by Harald Høffding and in religious history and mathematics by Julius Petersen.

== Career ==
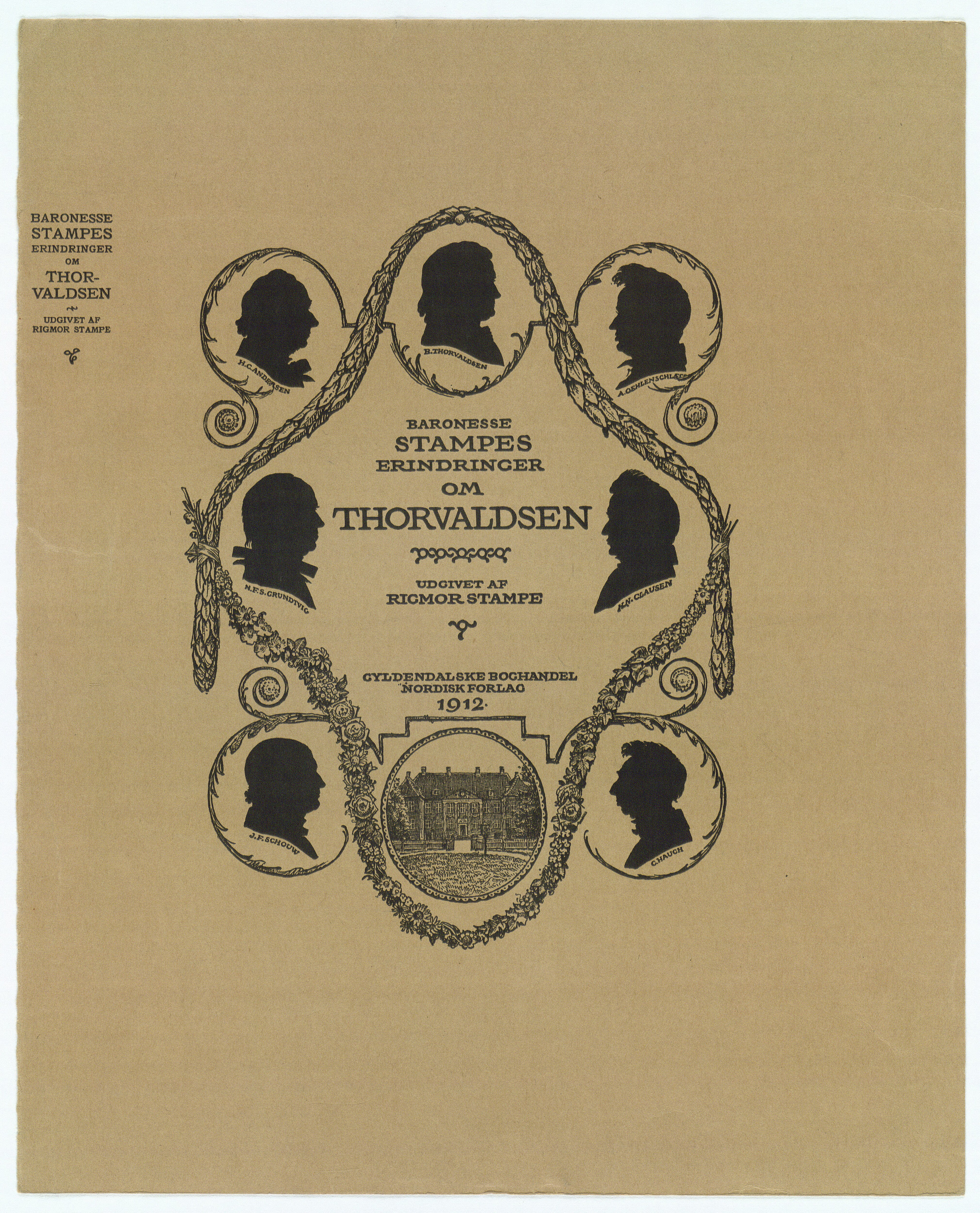
Baronesse Stampes Erindringer om Thorvaldsen, 1912.

After the birth of her three children, Karen (1881), Aage (1882) and Kaj Victor (1883), Bendix devoted her time to the household. Despite difficult times, including the death of Aage in 1899, the marriage held together for a time. As the children grew older, Bendix became set on supporting Copenhagen's Playground Association (Legepladsforening) which she founded in 1891 and headed until 1921. She was particularly successful in establishing playgrounds with sandpits. She also founded the Children's Picture Collection (Børnenes Billedindsamling) and, hoping to provide the city's children with interest in nature, she founded the School Garden Association (Skolehaven).

From 1898 to 1904, she edited Kvindernes Blad, a supplement to Nationaltidende, Dagbladet and Dagens Nyheder, developing strong support for the women's movement. In 1904, faced with serious marital difficulties, she gave up the position which was taken by Mathilde Lütken. Following her divorce in 1905, she enjoyed a more relaxed existence, concentrating on writing and cultural activities. In particular, in 1912 she edited and published her grandmother's colourful memoirs on Thorvaldsen and in 1918, she published H.C. Andersen og hans nærmeste Omgang.

Rigmor Stampe Bendix died in Frederiksberg on 9 March 1923. She is buried in Copenhagen's Assistens Cemetery.
