= Charlottenborg =

Charlottenborg may refer to:

- Charlottenborg manor house, Motala, Sweden
- An area in Motala, Sweden, surrounding the Charlottenborg manor house
- Charlottenborg Palace, Copenhagen, Denmark
- Kunsthal Charlottenborg, an art gallery in Copenhagen, Denmark

== See also ==
- Charlottenberg
- Charlottenburg
