= Heinrich Buntzen =

Danish landscape painter

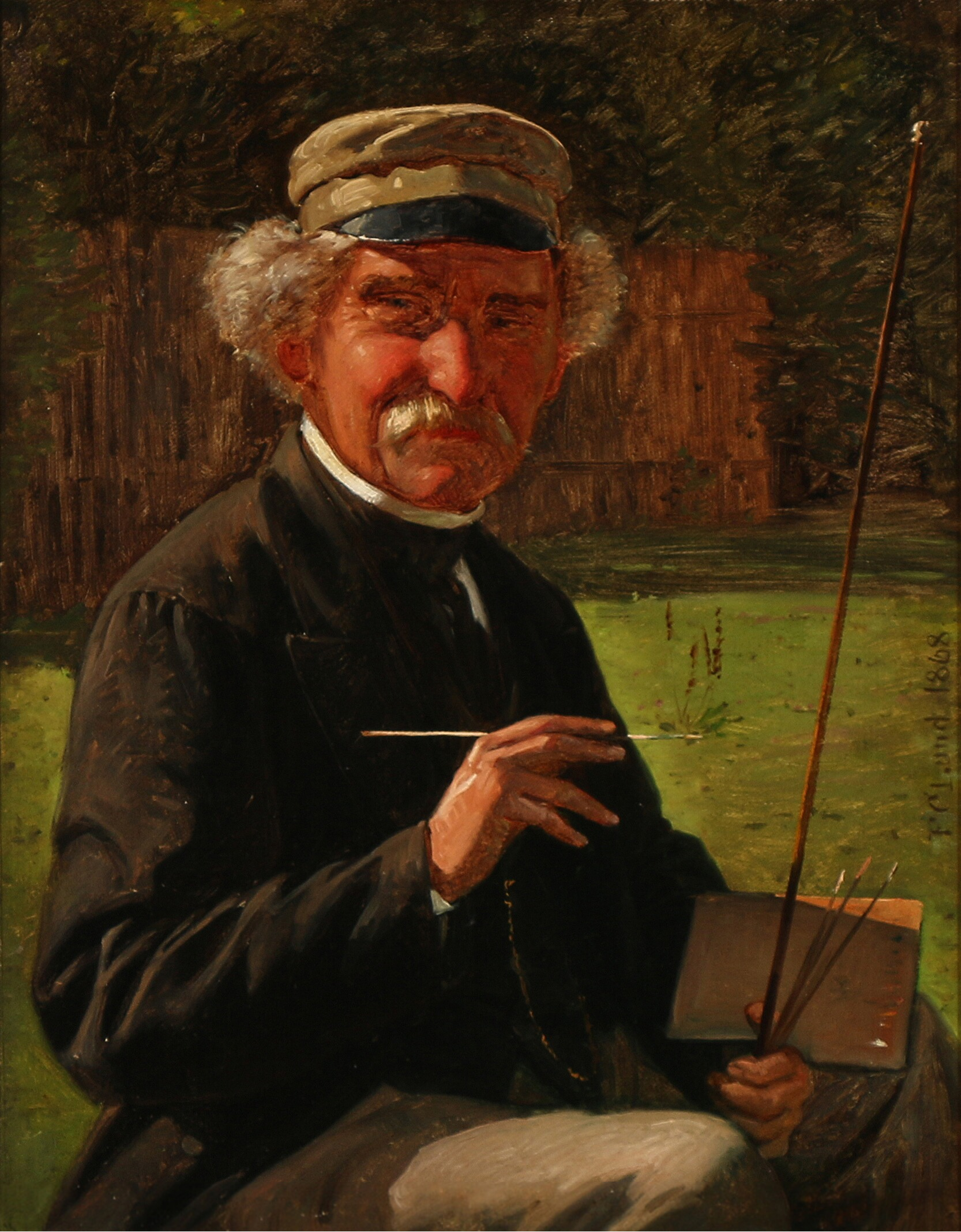
Heinrich Buntzen; portrait by Frederik Christian Lund (1868)

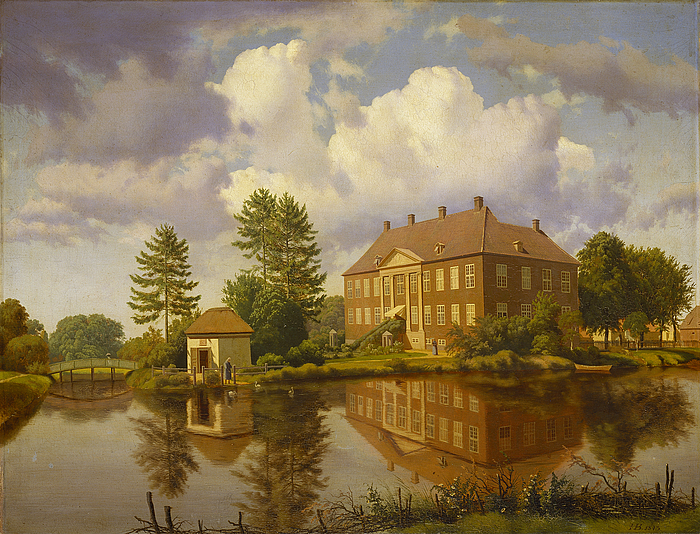
Nysø Manor, with Bertel Thorvaldsen at his studio

Heinrich Christian August Buntzen (29 September 1803, Kiel – 12 January 1892, Ordrup) was a Danish landscape painter.

== Biography ==
His father, Johan Ditlev Buntzen, was a merchant. He began developing his artistic talents in Kiel, partly by taking lessons from the Bünsow brothers, Ludwig Johann Christian and Joachim Johann Friedrich, partly by self-study; copying the etchings of Antonie Waterloo. In 1821, he went to Copenhagen, where he studied at the Royal Danish Academy of Fine Arts, with Johan Ludwig Lund and Jens Peter Møller.

His first showing was at an exhibition in Charlottenborg Palace in 1824 and, later, he won several prizes for his landscape paintings. During the 1830s, the academy purchased several of his works, as did the Royal Collection.

In 1833, he married Caroline Birgitte Hansen (1805–1882), the daughter of a "blogmager" (someone who makes equipment for sailing ships). They spent most of their married life in a small rural home, just outside of Charlottenlund.

He received two major travel grants: in 1838, from the Fonden ad usus publicos, a fund for promoting the arts and sciences, then, in 1840, from the Royal Academy. Much of this time was spent in Italy. When he returned home, in 1842, he became an Agré (a type of member candidate) at the academy, then a full member in 1850. He was named a professor in 1863, and was given a lifetime Sødring Endowment in 1868. He was awarded the Order of the Dannebrog in 1877.

== Sources ==
- Biography from the Dansk Biografisk Lexikon @ Project Runeberg
- Biographical notes @ Gravsted
- Biographical data @ the Kunstindeks Danmark
