= Astrid Stampe Feddersen =

Danish women's rights activist and author

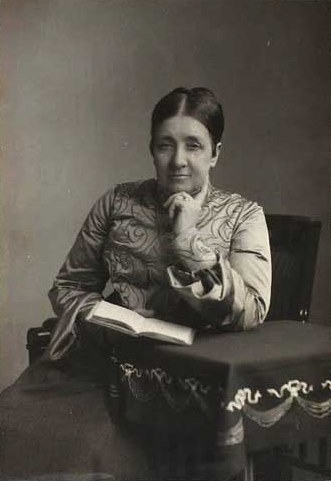
- Born: 19 December 1852; Christinelund, Denmark
- Died: 16 April 1930 (aged 77); Copenhagen, Denmark
- Relatives: Rigmor Stampe Bendix (sister) Christine Stampe (grandmother)
- Honours: Gold Medal of Merit, 1922

Astrid Stampe Feddersen, usually known as Astrid Stampe, (1852–1930) was a Danish women's rights activist and author alongside her sister Rigmor Stampe Bendix. Stampe joined the women's movement early on and from 1883 to 1887, she was on the board of the Danish Women's Society, playing an active part in work on women's issues.

As an activist, Stampe authored several pamphlets in support of her cause, including: Kvindesagen (1886) and Kan Kvindesagen og Sædelighedssagen skilles ad? (1888).

== Early life and education ==
Born on 19 December 1852 at Christinelund near Vordingborg, Stampe was of noble ancestry. She was the daughter of Henrik Stampe (1821–1892), a Chamberlain and Hofjægermester. Because of her father's rank, she was born with the title of baroness. Other family member of note include her grandmother, Christine Stampe, and her great-grandfather, Jonas Collin, who was Hans Christian Andersen's fatherly benefactor. Stampe's personal tutors, her upbringing in Copenhagen, and her educational travels gave her a cultured background. She learned Swedish, French and English though as a result of the Schleswig wars, she did not learn German.

== Career ==
In 1881, she married Gustav Hakon Valdemar Feddersen (1848–1912). In the course of his career, Gustav was an assistant to the Ministry of the Interior, an Amtman in Ringkjøbing, and later for the Diocese of Lolland-Falster. The couple had four children: Hakon (born 1883), Jonna (1884), Gudrun (1887), and Ingrid Kristine (1888).

Stampe took part in the fight against prostitution and fought for greater equality between men and women, including unmarried women. Her husband supported her feminist interests and her membership of the Copenhagen chapter of the Danish Women's Society, beginning in 1882. She successfully sought to reinforce the association's position and extend its influence to the provinces. In April 1883, she became a member of the board of the Women's Society a position which she held until 1887, though she was re-elected to the board in 1903. She was chairman of the society from 1913 until 1918. In this position, she chaired the first Nordic meeting on women's rights in Copenhagen in 1914.

Stampe wrote an article in Højskolebladet which called for the founding of a Danish society for "friends of Iceland," much like the already existing German society Islandsfreunde. In 1916, her proposed society became the Danish-Icelandic Society (Danish: Dansk-Islandsk Samfund). Stampe was awarded the Gold Medal of Merit on her 70th birthday in 1922.

== Death ==
She died on 16 April 1930 in Copenhagen. She was buried at Jungshoved Cemetery, though her grave is no longer there.

== Selected works ==
- Kvindesagen, 1886
- Kan Kvindesagen og Sædelighedssagen skilles ad?, 1888
- Om Kvindesagen: Et Foredrag, 1907
- Frue og Frøken, 1911
- Vort Modersmaal, 1912
- Dansk Navneskik, 1914
