= Ewert Janssen =

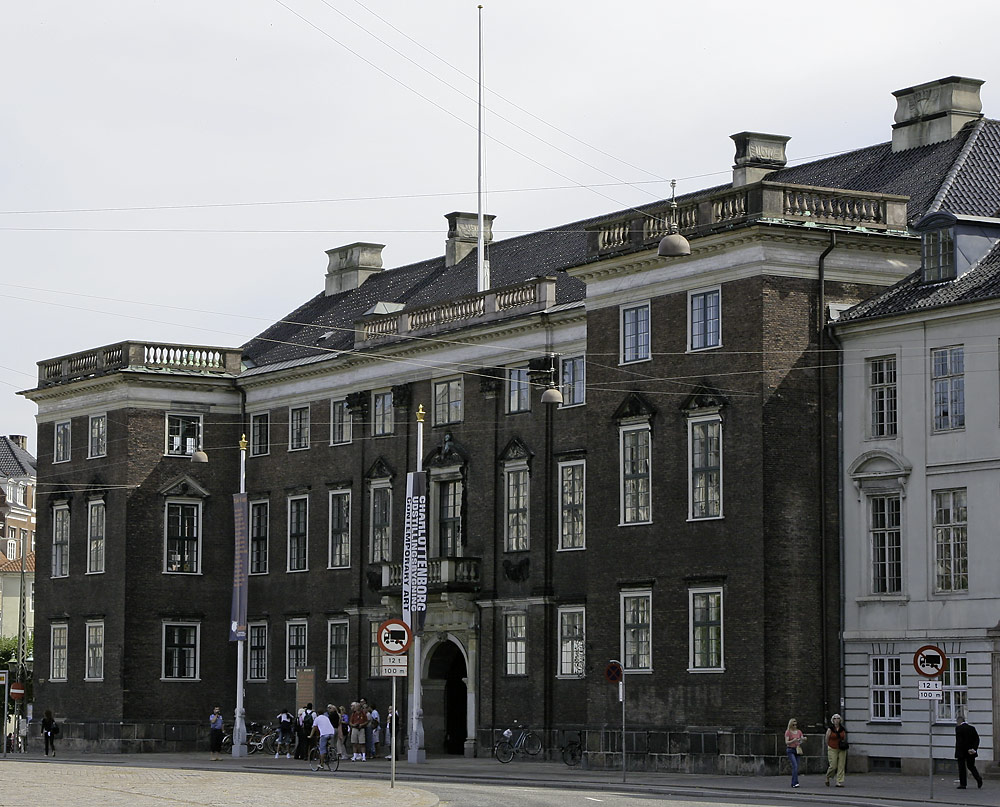
Ewert Janssen's Charlottenborg Palace

Ewert Janssen or Evert Janssen (died c. 1692) was a Danish architect who became a royal masterbuilder in 1668. His greatest achievement was Charlottenborg Palace in Copenhagen.

== Life and achievements ==
Ewert Janssen, along with Ernst Brandenburger a few years later, was one of the great masterbuilders of the absolute monarchy which, instituted by Frederick III, played an important part in supporting architectural developments.

=== Stairway at Gjorslev ===
In 1665, Janssen completed his first major achievement with a connecting stairway at the medieval Gjorslev Castle in the south of Sealand. It appears to have been copied from an earlier design by Dutch architect Philips Vingboons.

=== Skanderborg Castle ===
After his appointment as royal masterbuilder in 1668, he prepared a number of drawings showing how Skanderborg Castle could, for a reasonably small sum, be adapted to the style of the period, possibly for the use of Crown Princess Charlotte Amalie. The work was, however, not carried out.

=== Charlottenborg ===
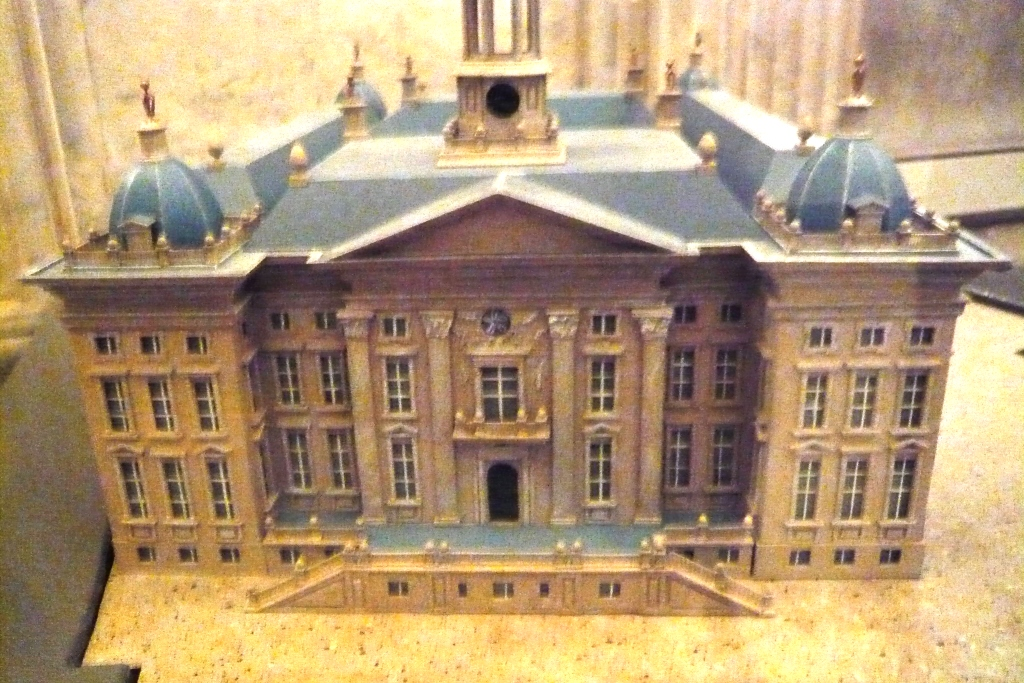
Model of his plans for the New Amsterdam City Hall, by Philips Vingboons

His original drawings for Charlottenborg Palace appear once again to have been based on Vingboom's plans for Amsterdam's city hall which is now the royal residence. It was only thanks to Lambert van Haven's significant alterations that the building has a style of its own. Nevertheless, it is considered to be one of Denmark's architectural masterpieces.

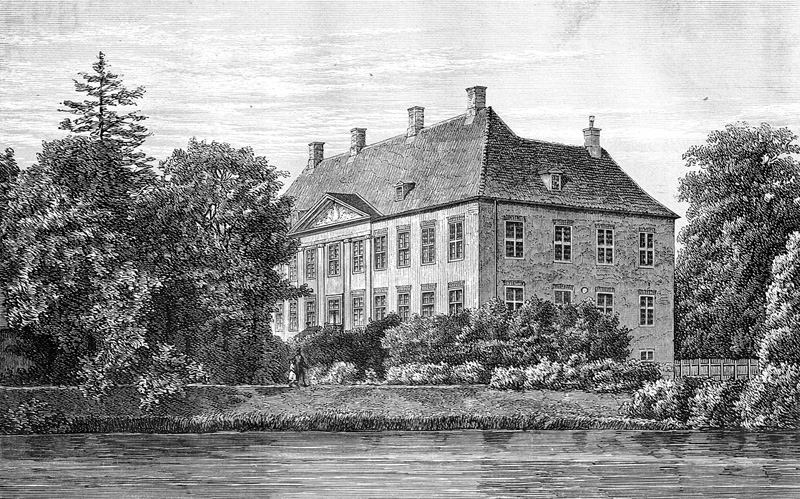
Nysø Manor: drawing from 1872

=== Nysø Manor ===
Janssen is also credited with the design of several manor houses in southern Sealand, the most impressive being Nysø Manor, the first Baroque building of its kind in Denmark.

=== Other contributions ===
- Manor house near Frederiksdal, Lolland (c. 1670)
- Riding arena at Copenhagen Castle (1669, demolished 1740)
- Gjethuset: theatre on Kongens Nytorv (1671, demolished 1673)
- Søkvæsthuset, Kvæsthusgade, Gopenhagen (1684, now demolished)
- Plans for Clausholm Castle (c. 1690)
