= Nysø Manor =

Biographical museum in Denmark

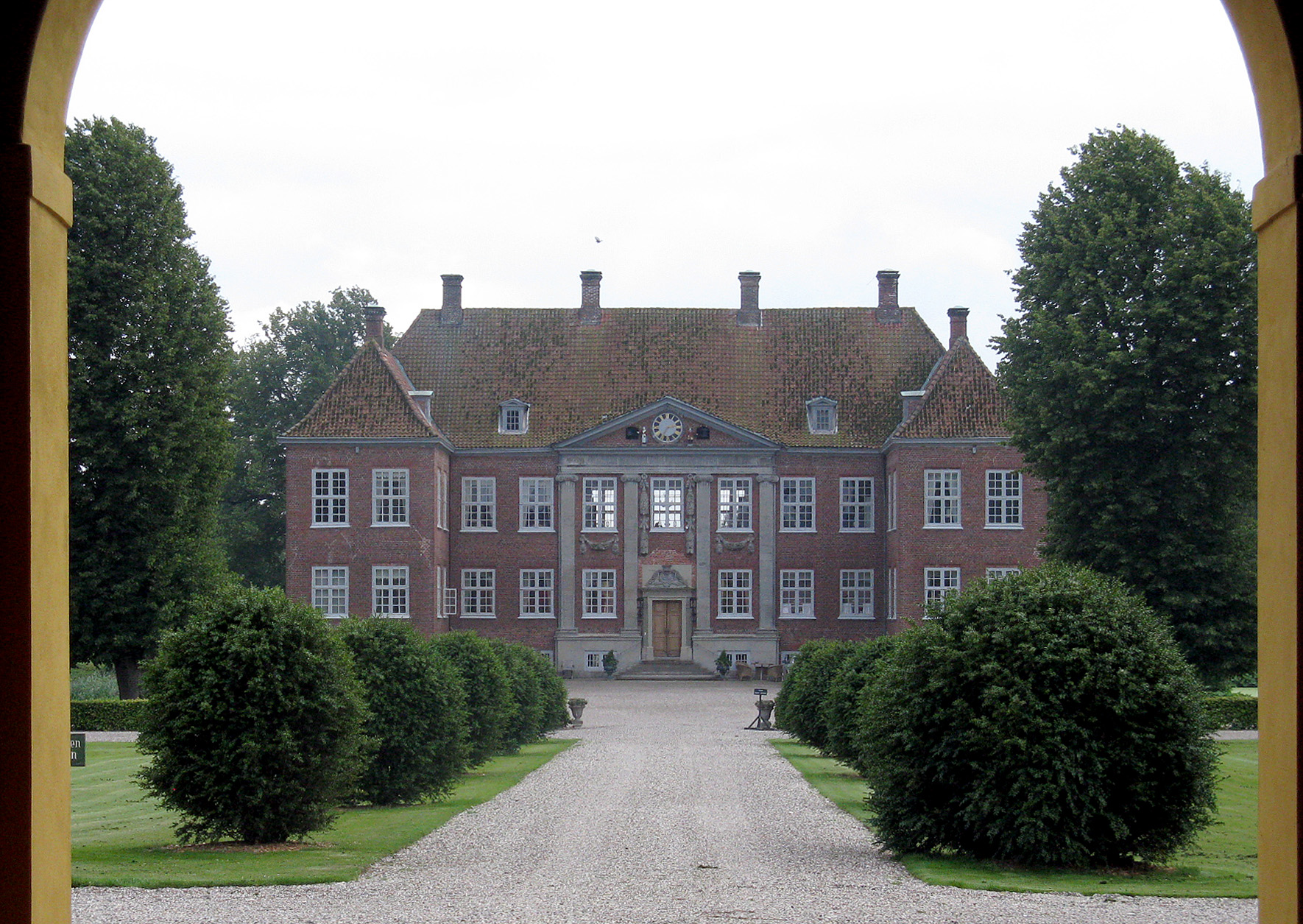
- Interactive map of the Nysø Manor area

General information
- Architectural style: Baroque
- Location: Præstø, Denmark
- Coordinates: 55°7′36″N 12°1′50″E
- Completed: 1673
- Client: Jens Lauridsen

Design and construction
- Engineer: Ewert Janssen

Nysø Manor, located near Præstø in the southeast of the Danish island of Sealand, was built in 1673 for Jens Lauridsen, a local functionary. It now houses the Thorvaldsen Collection, a group of works by the Danish sculptor Bertel Thorvaldsen, who lived and worked there in his later years.

== Architecture ==
The first manor house in Denmark to be designed in the Baroque style, it is built in red brick and sandstone with a red-tiled roof and a granite plinth as a foundation. It is thought to be the work of master builder Ewert Janssen who probably also built Charlottenborg Palace in Copenhagen shortly afterwards.

The house consists of a main wing with 11 bays and lateral wings to the north with an entrance in between. The central projects on the north and south sides are decorated with four Ionic pilasters which support triangular pediments. On the north side, there is a clock with two figures whose bells strike the hour.

== Situation ==
A moat originally encircled the entire building but in 1780 the moat on the north side was filled in to accommodate estate buildings. The Thorvaldsen Collection is housed in one of the red-brick buildings to the east.

The Nysø Estate extends over 1,041 hectares, encompassing Jungshovedgaard, Christinelund, Henriklund and Mariannelund.

== Golden Age venue ==
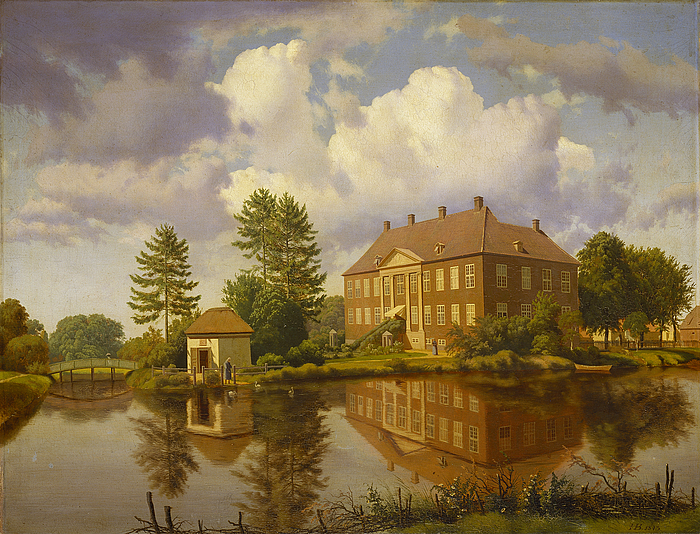
Nysø Manor with Thorvaldsen's studio, painted in 1843 by Heinrich Buntzen (Thorvaldsens Museum)

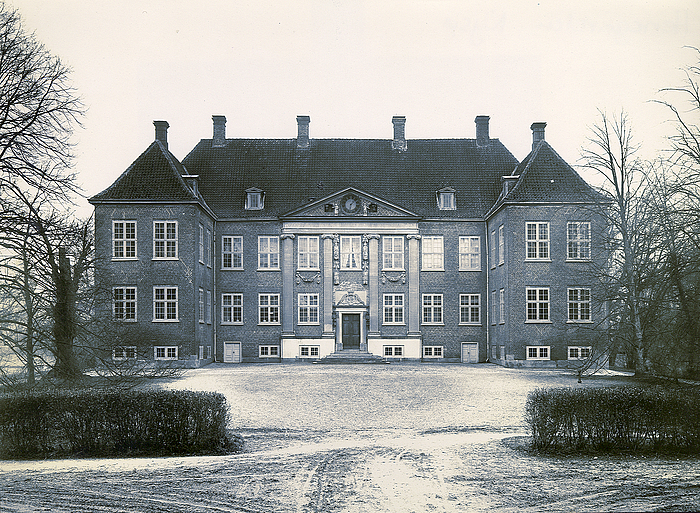
Nysø in 1938

Nysø is especially known for its role in the Danish cultural Golden Age of the early-to-mid-19th century when Baron Henrik Stampe and his wife Christine played host to many famous writers and artists, including Hans Christian Andersen and the sculptor Thorvaldsen. The latter spent much of his last six years here (1838–44), where he had a studio in the house and in the garden (the white structure in the picture above). Thorvaldsen who had a studio in the house spent much of his last six years there. Today Nysø houses the Thorvaldsen Collection which is open to the public in the summer months.

== About the collection ==
The Thorvaldsen Collection is open for visitors from 12 noon to 4 pm on Saturdays and Sundays from 1 May to 31 August. The collection contains Thorvaldsen's clay models, sculptures and drawings as well as artwork from other famous visitors.

== List of owners ==
- (1670-1687) Jens Lauridsen
- (1687-1707) Barbara Wilders gift Lauridsen
- (1707-1709) Anne Margrethe Lauridsdatter Lauridsen
- (1709-1742) Johann Nicolaus Voigt
- (1742-1761) Cathrine Kristine von Holstein gift Danneskiold-Samsøe
- (1761-1763) Gustav Frederik Holck
- (1763-1785) Henrik Adam Brockenhuus
- (1785-1795) Niels Lunde Reiersen
- (1795-1800) Peter Thestrup
- (1800-1826) Holger Stampe
- (1826-1876) Henrik Stampe
- (1876-1892) Henrik Stampe
- (1892-1904) Holger Stampe-Charisius
- (1904-1925) Henrik Stampe
- (1925-1934) Slægten Stampe
- (1934-1960) Birgitte Stampe gift Holst
- (1960-1990) Peter Stampe Holst
- (1990-2010) Peter Stampe Holst / Marianne Themsen gift Stampe Holst
- (2010-) Marianne Themsen gift Stampe Holst

== See also ==
- Thorvaldsen Museum
