= Jungshoved Church =

Coordinates: 55.081°N 12.122°E

- Jungshoved Kirke
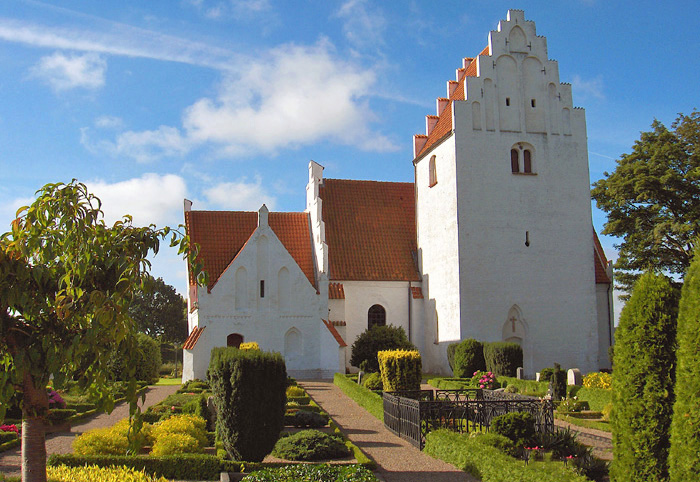
- Jungshoved Church
- Location: Jungshoved By, Vordingborg Municipality
- Country: Denmark
- Denomination: Church of Denmark

Architecture
- Style: Romanesque architecture, Gothic architecture
- Years built: 1225–1250

Administration
- Diocese: Diocese of Roskilde
- Deanery: Stege-Vordingborg Provsti
- Parish: Jungshoved Sogn

Jungshoved Church (Danish: Jungshoved Kirke) is a Danish romanesque church in Vordingborg Municipality, on the southern end of the island of Zealand.

The Church serves as the seat of Jungshoved Parish within the Diocese of Roskilde.

== Building ==
The church was built on the former site of Jungshoved castle. The oldest part of the church was erected between 1225 and 1250 in the late romanesque style, while the last part of the church is built in the 16th century in late gothic style.

The baptismal font and altarpiece are decorated with reliefs by Bertel Thorvaldsen. The pulpit in High Renaissance is created approximately 1605–10 in the Schrøder workshop in Næstved.

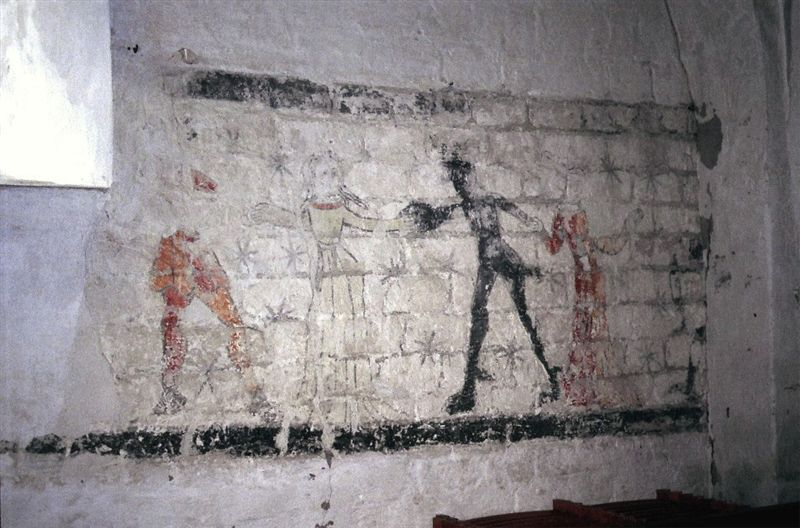
Danse Macabre fresco

Remnants of gothic frescos are visible on the vaults of the church's ceiling. On the west wall of the nave, a scene depicting Danse Macabre is painted.
