= Victor Bendix =

Danish composer, conductor and pianist

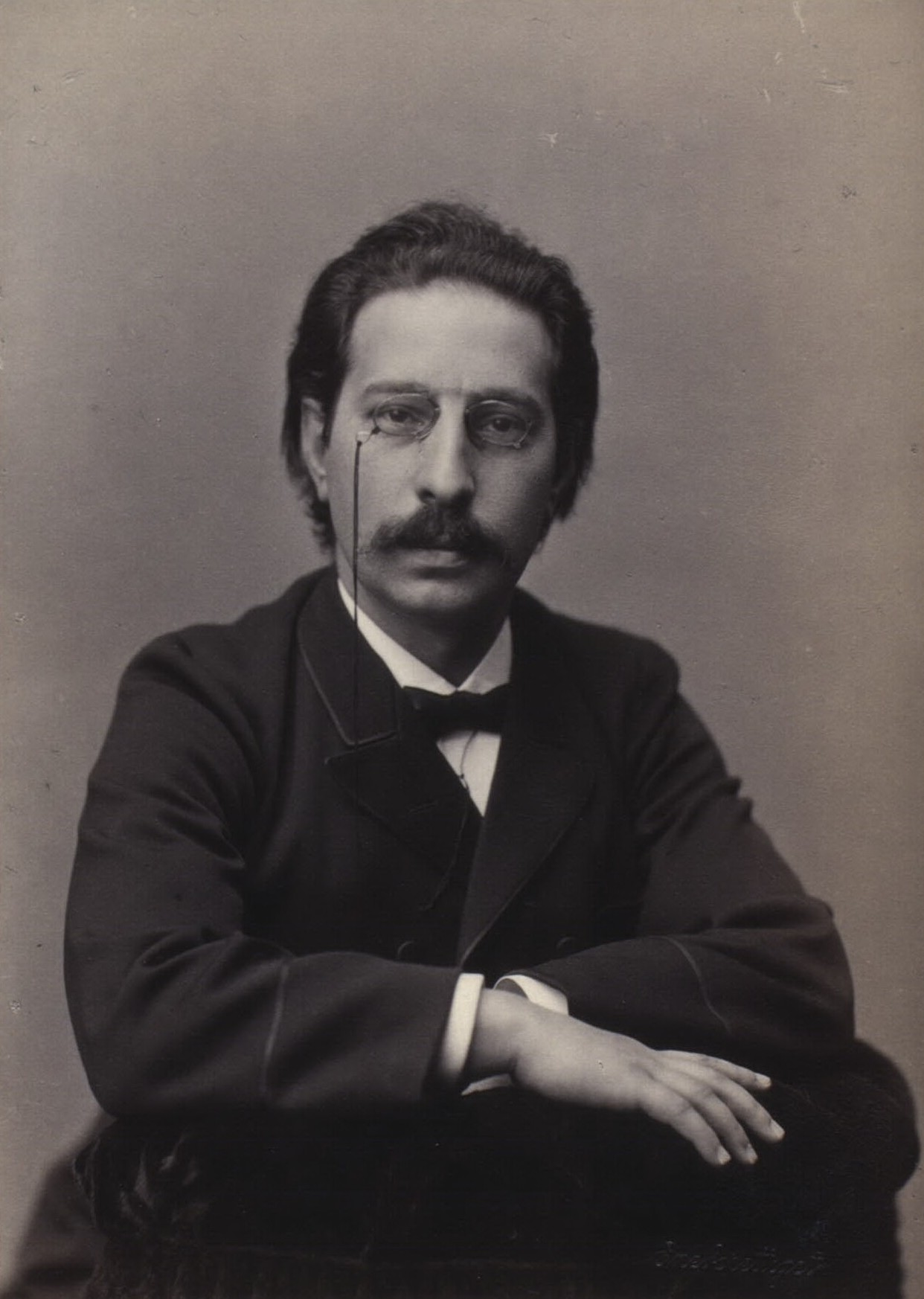
Victor Bendix.

Victor Emanuel Bendix (17 May 1851 in Copenhagen – January 1926) was a Danish composer, conductor and pianist, who came from a Jewish family. His teachers included Niels Gade.

He studied at the conservatory of music at Copenhagen, then newly founded, from 1867 to 1869. He studied piano under August Winding and composition under Niels W. Gade. He visited Germany and other countries abroad; his compositions show the influence of modern German romanticism.

He was also a friend of Carl Nielsen, who dedicated his Symphonic Suite for piano (1894) to Bendix.

In 1879, he married the writer and philanthropist Baroness Rigmor Stampe.

== Selected works ==
- Symphonies
  - Symphony no. 1, op. 16, "Fjældstigning" in C major (1882)
  - Symphony no. 2, op. 20 "Sommerklange fra Sydrusland" in D major (1888)
  - Symphony no. 3, op. 25 in A minor (1895)
  - Symphony no. 4, op. 30 in D minor (1904-5) (US premiere? by the Boston Symphony, April 26, 1907 conducted by Karl Muck)
- Concertante works
  - Piano Concerto in G minor, op. 17 (1884)
- Orchestral works
  - Dance suite in A, op. 29 (1903) (given a performance conducted by Bendix in 1921)
- Chamber music
  - Piano Trio in A major, op. 12 (1877)
  - Piano Sonata in G minor, op. 26 (published 1901)
  - Intermezzo for piano (published 1916)
