= Christine Stampe =

Danish noblewoman

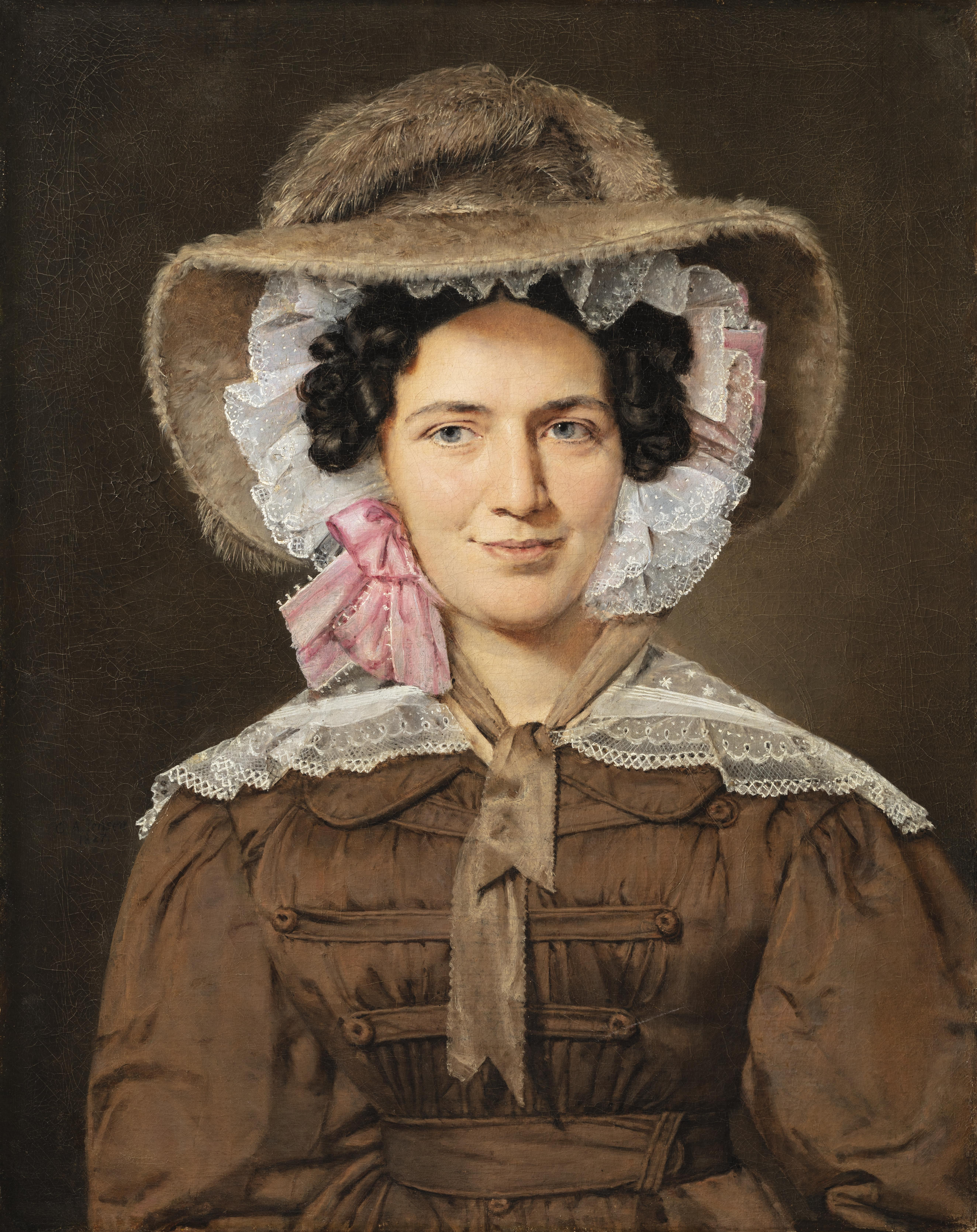
Christine Stampe, painted in 1827 by C. A. Jensen.

Christine Stampe, née Dalgas (20 April 1797 – 5 May 1868), was a Danish noblewoman known as one of the chief benefactors of the Danish sculptor Bertel Thorvaldsen.

== Biography ==
Christine Marguerite Salome Dalgas married Baron Henrik Stampe (b. 1795). They had two sons, and her granddaughter Astrid became a women's rights activist.

After their marriage, the Stampes initially lived at Christinelund, a farm belonging to Nysø Manor on the island of Zealand. Christinelund, which Henrik named for his wife, is now on the Danish registry of protected buildings. A few years later, they moved into the main house on Nysø Manor, where they hosted many notable Danish artists and writers, including the writer Hans Christian Andersen and the sculptor Bertel Thorvaldsen. Christine became a close friend of Thorvaldsen, who resided at Nysø for most of the last six years of his life. She supported his work and helped to collect the funds to build the Thorvaldsen Museum in Copenhagen.

Her memoir about Thorvaldsen, Baroness Stampe's Memories of Thorvaldsen, was published in 1912 and is credited with reviving interest in his work.

Her 1827 portrait by C. A. Jensen is in the collection of the Thorvaldsen Museum.
