= Charlottenborg Palace =

1677 Danish mansion

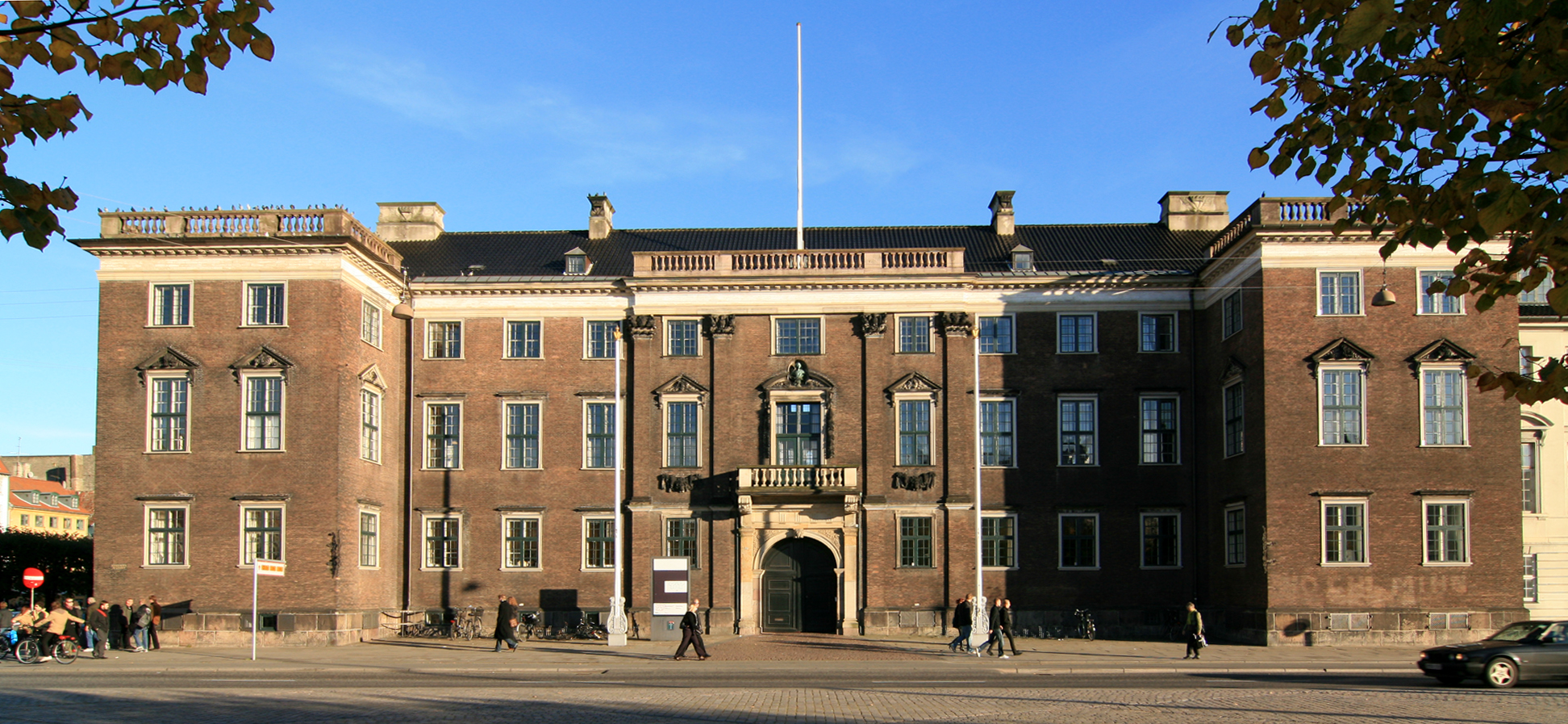
- Charlottenborg
- Interactive map of the Charlottenborg Palace area

General information
- Architectural style: Dutch Baroque architecture
- Location: Copenhagen, Denmark
- Coordinates: 55°40′49″N 12°35′15″E
- Construction started: 3 April 1673
- Completed: 1677; 1683 (fourth wing)
- Client: Ulrik Frederik Gyldenløve

Design and construction
- Architect: Ewert Janssen

Charlottenborg Palace (Danish: Charlottenborg Slot) is a large town mansion located on the corner of Kongens Nytorv and Nyhavn in Copenhagen, Denmark. Originally built as a residence for Ulrik Frederik Gyldenløve, it has served as the base of the Royal Danish Academy of Fine Arts since its foundation in 1754. Today it also houses Kunsthal Charlottenborg, an institution for contemporary art, and Danmarks Kunstbibliotek, the Royal Art Library.

== History ==
=== Gyldenløve's mansion ===
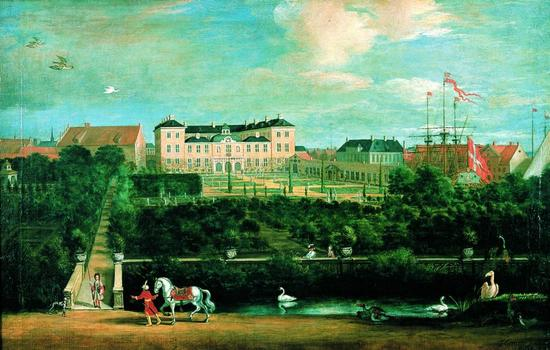
Charlottenborg painted by Jacob Coning in 1694 as seen from the garden

The site was donated by King Christian V to his half brother Ulrik Frederik Gyldenløve on 22 March 1669 in connection with the establishment of Kongens Nytorv. Gyldenløve built his new mansion from 1672 to 1683 as the first building on the new square.

The main wing and two lateral wings were built from 1672 to 1677, probably under the architect Ewert Janssen. In 1783 the mansion was extended with a rear, fourth wing designed by Lambert van Haven. The bricks used were brought from Kalø Castle in Jutland, which Gyldenløve owned and had pulled down.

In his old age, the large mansion became too big for Gyldenløve, who sold it to the dowager queen Charlotte Amalie in 1700, hence the name. Gyldenløve built a new, smaller mansion on the corner of Bredgade and Dronningens Tværgade which became known as "Gyldenløve's little mansion", now Moltke's Mansion, after a later owner, where he lived until his death in 1705.

After King Christian V´s death in 1699 the queen mother, Charlotte Amalie, purchased the palace for 50,000 Danish crowns and it was renamed Charlottenborg Palace. In 1714, when the Queen Dowager died, the place was passed to King Christian VI. Renovations began in 1736–1737, and its use and users shifted for a period of time. A small theater was constructed and used for various concerts, operas and theatrical performances. The palace garden contained the Botanical Garden between 1778 and 1872.

=== The Royal Danish Academy of Arts ===
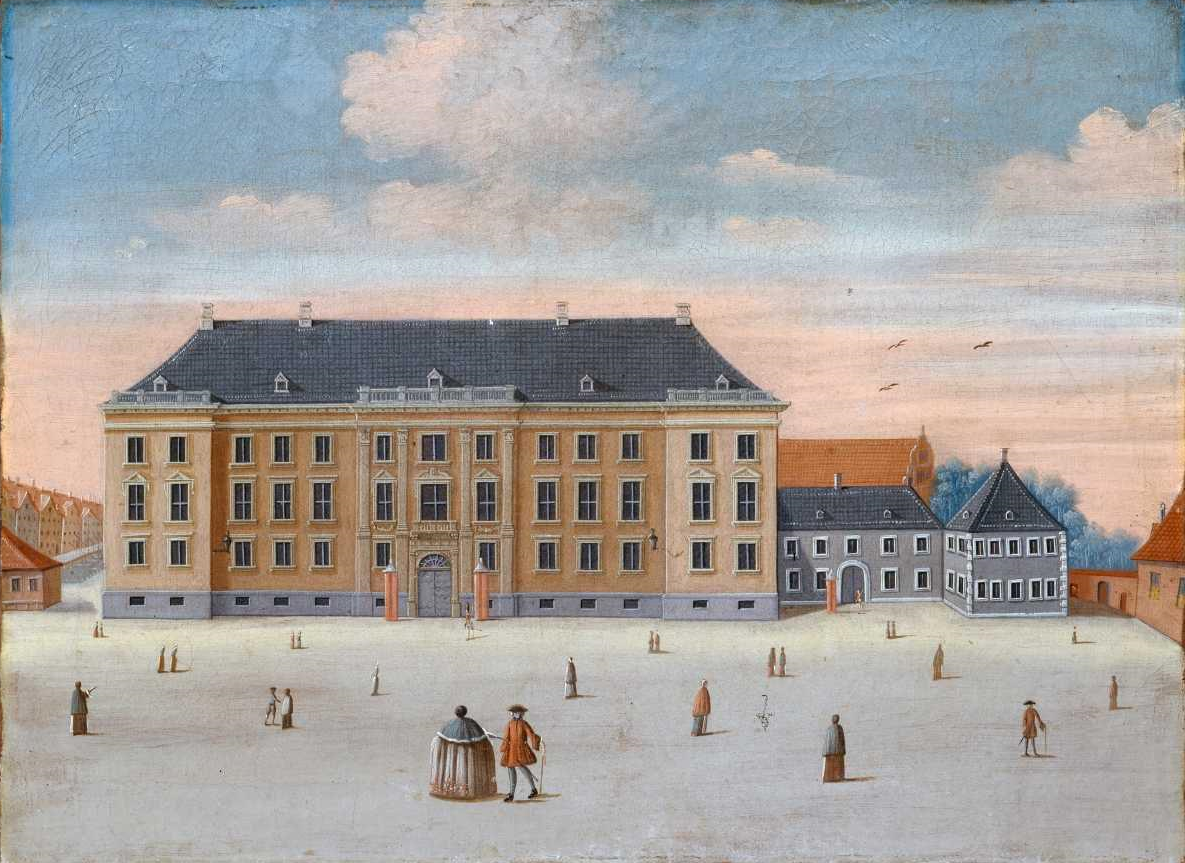
Charlottenborg in 1748

In 1701, the old Academy of Arts began its activities in the palace. The small school slowly grew and was finally formally inaugurated in the Charlottenborg Palace on 31 March 1754. In 1787, the ownership of the palace was transferred to the Royal Danish Academy of Art. The academy still occupies the palace.

== Architecture ==
Charlottenborg is a four-winged, three-storey building designed in the Dutch Baroque architecture style but also with some Italian influence. The main wing towards the square has a central risalit flanked by two more pronounced, two-bay corner risalit. All three are topped by balustrades. The central risalit is decorated with Corinthian pilasters and a Tuscan/Doric portal with balcony. The facade has sandstone decorations and window pediments.

The lower rear wing consists of three pavilions. The central pavilion has a Tuscan arcade below, niches with busts above, and a lantern on the copper-covered roof.

=== Interior ===
The floor plan is reminiscent of French castles. It has a piano nobile with a banquet hall above the main entrance, with access to the balcony, a ground floor with lower ceilings, and a second floors for servants with even lower ones. This arrangement became characteristic of mansions and upper-class town houses in the entire 18th century.

In the rear wing, above the arcade, there is a well-preserved domed Baroque room with a splendid stucco ceiling.

== Contemporary activities ==
- Royal Danish Academy of Art
- Kunsthal Charlottenborg, Exhibition Hall
- Danish National Art Library

== Cultural references ==
- In the 2015 drama film The Danish Girl, Charlottenborg is the location where Einar (Eddie Redmayne) and Gerda (Alicia Vikander) meet as students at the Royal Danish Academy of Fine Arts.

== See also ==
- Architecture of Denmark
- Art of Denmark
- Charlottenborg (disambiguation)
