= North Campus (University of Copenhagen) =

University campus in Copenhagen

Coordinates: 55°41′59″N 12°33′39″E

The North Campus (Danish: Nørre Campus) is one of the University of Copenhagen's four campuses in Copenhagen, Denmark. It is situated just north of the city centre, across from Copenhagen's largest park, Fælledparken, and between the Østerbro and Nørrebro districts. It is home to the Faculty of Science and the Faculty of Health and Medical Sciences.

== Overview ==
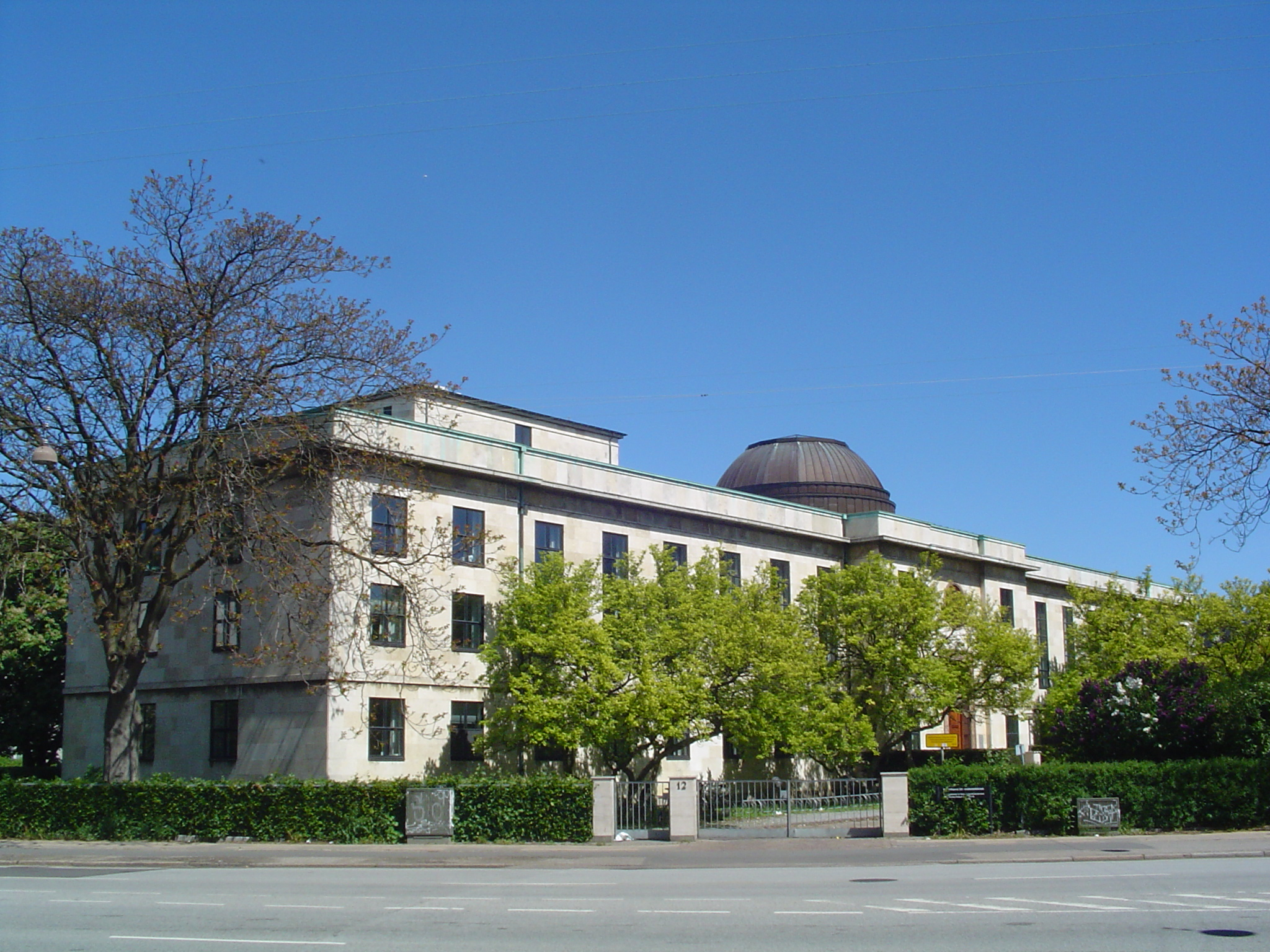
The Faculty Library of Natural and Health Sciences (KUB Nord), as seen across Tagensvej from the south

The North Campus is home to two of the University of Copenhagen's six faculties: the Faculty of Science and the Faculty of Health and Medical Sciences. The Faculty of Science's main area is University Park (Universitetsparken), a triangle-shaped area located between Jagtvej, Tagensvej and Nørre Allé. A street divides the area into northern and southern sections. Most of the buildings in the area's northern section are used by the Faculty of Health and Medical Sciences' School of Pharmaceutical Sciences, while most of the buildings in the southern section are used by the Faculty of Science.

The Faculty of Health and Medical Sciences' main area is the Panum Building, which is located south of the University Park and across the street from Rigshospitalet (Copenhagen University Hospital). It is the Faculty of Health and Medical Sciences' largest building complex and houses six of the Faculty's thirteen departments.

Between the Panum building complex and the University Park is the Faculty Library of Natural and Health Sciences (KUB Nord), which is part of the Royal Library and shared by both faculties.

The North Campus also has satellite buildings, such as the Teilum Building, the Niels Bohr Institute, and the Medical Museion.

== University Park ==
The University Park (Universitetsparken) is a triangle-shaped area located in Nørrebro that is bordered by Jagtvej, Tagensvej and Nørre Allé. The area has been subject to the state since 1898 and contains a large number of buildings associated with the University of Copenhagen and Rigshospitalet. The area forms a central part of the North Campus and will therefore be subject to a number of changes until 2020.

The University Park is bisected by Lersø Parkallé. The part of Lersø Parkallé between Jagtvej and Nørre Allé is named Universitetsparken, thus creating addresses with that street name and dividing the University Park into northern and southern sections.

=== History ===
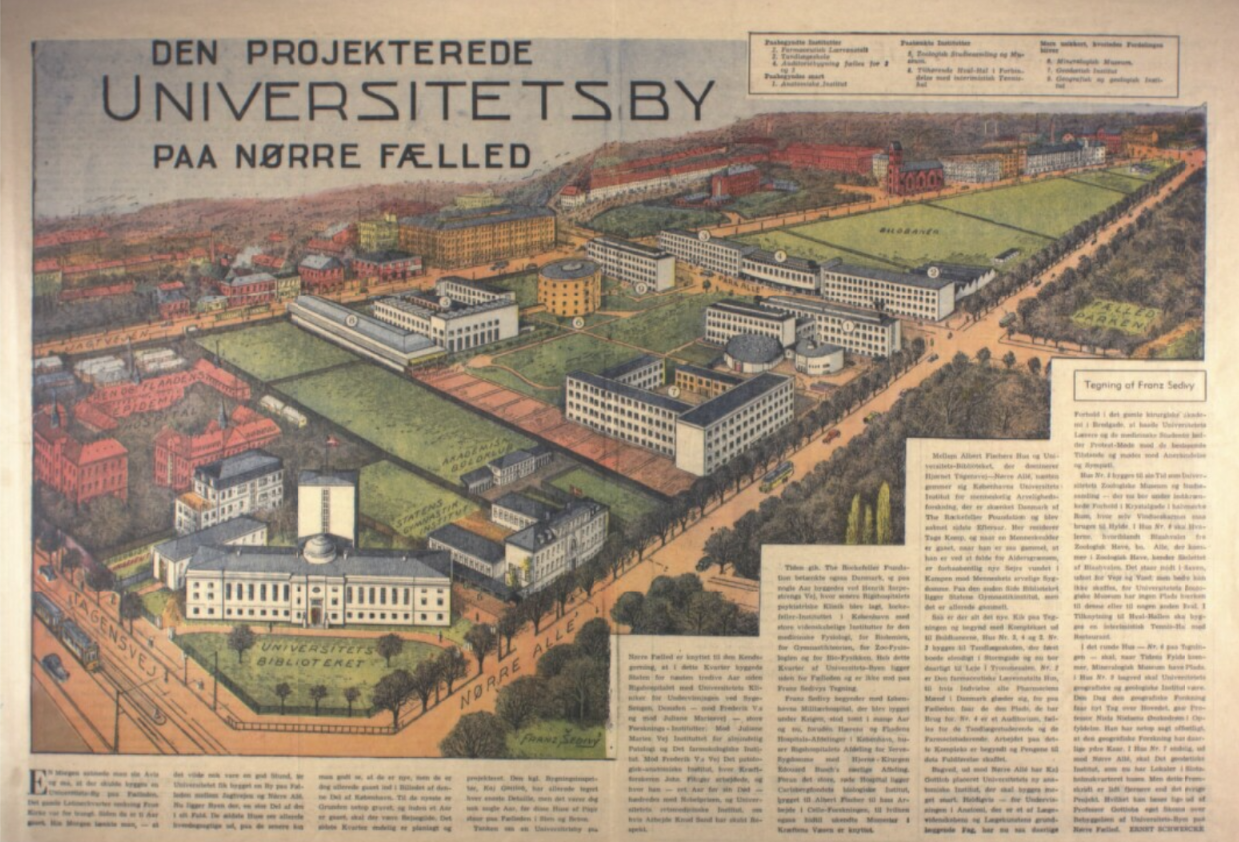
Franz Maria Šedivý: The Planned University Park, 1939

The area is historically part of Serridslev, which in 1525/1527 was given by the King and the bishop of Roskilde to Copenhagen and became Nørre Fælled. The part of Nørre Fælled which today constitutes University Park was given to the state by Copenhagen in an 1898 agreement. The agreement also dealt with the Rigshospitalet and Østerfælled Barracks areas.

The first settlement in the area was the Copenhagen Military Hospital (Københavns Militærhospital) along today's Tagensvej, in an area that extended from Jagtvej to Refnæsgade.

The vision for the University Park area was the brainchild of architect Kaj Gottlob in 1930, with buildings along Nørre Allé and Jagtvej encircling a central green area.

=== Selected buildings ===
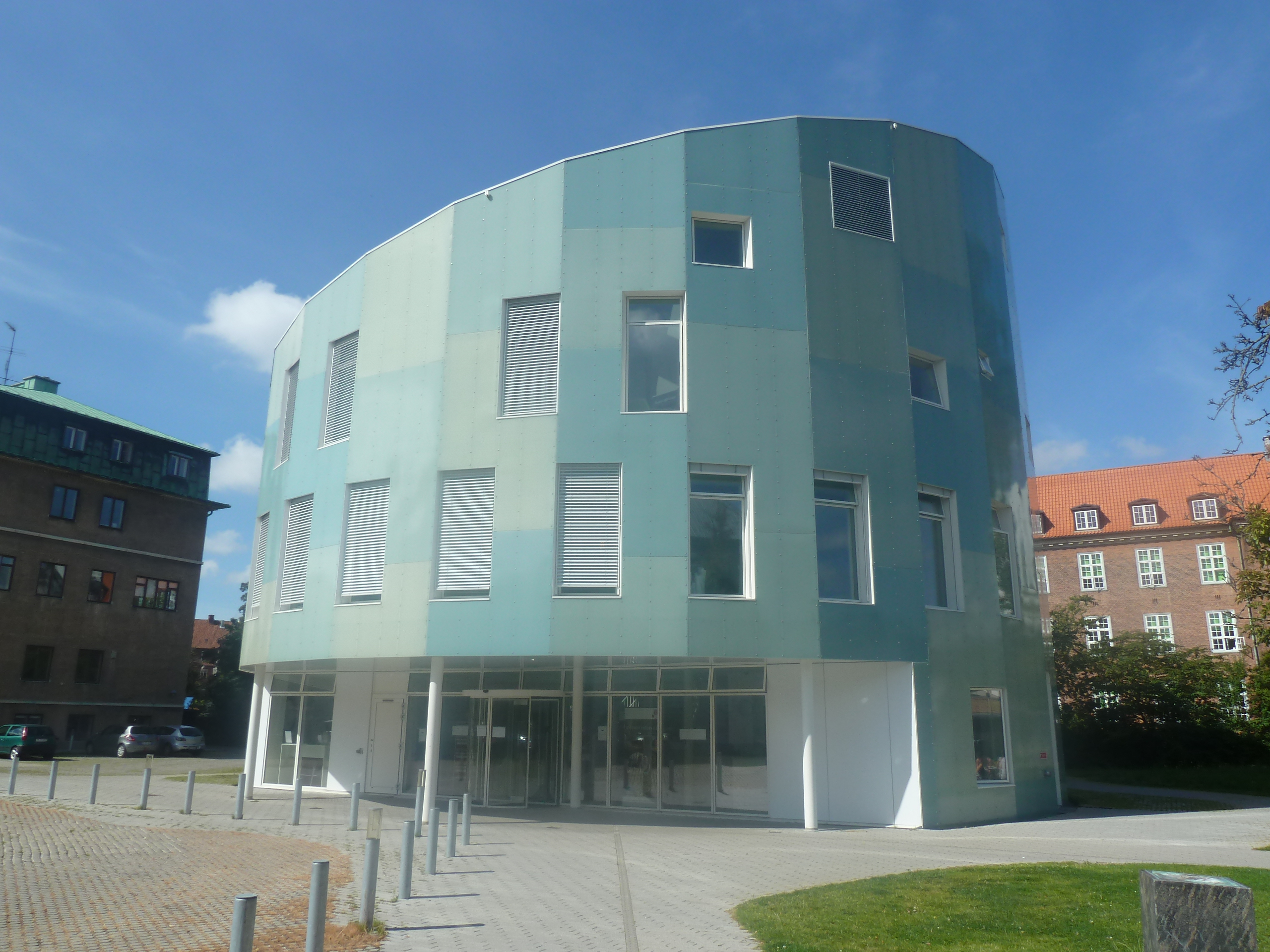
The Green Lighthouse

Buildings that are located within the University Park area include the Zoological Museum, the Green Lighthouse, the August Krogh Building, the Hans Christian Ørsted Building, the Copenhagen Biocenter, and the Faculty Library of Natural and Health Sciences (KUB Nord). Buildings that are also located within North Campus, but are not part of the University of Copenhagen, include the Copenhagen Bio Science Park (COBIS), Metropolitan University College, Rigshospitalets Kollegium, and Egmont H. Petersens Kollegium.

==== August Krogh Building ====
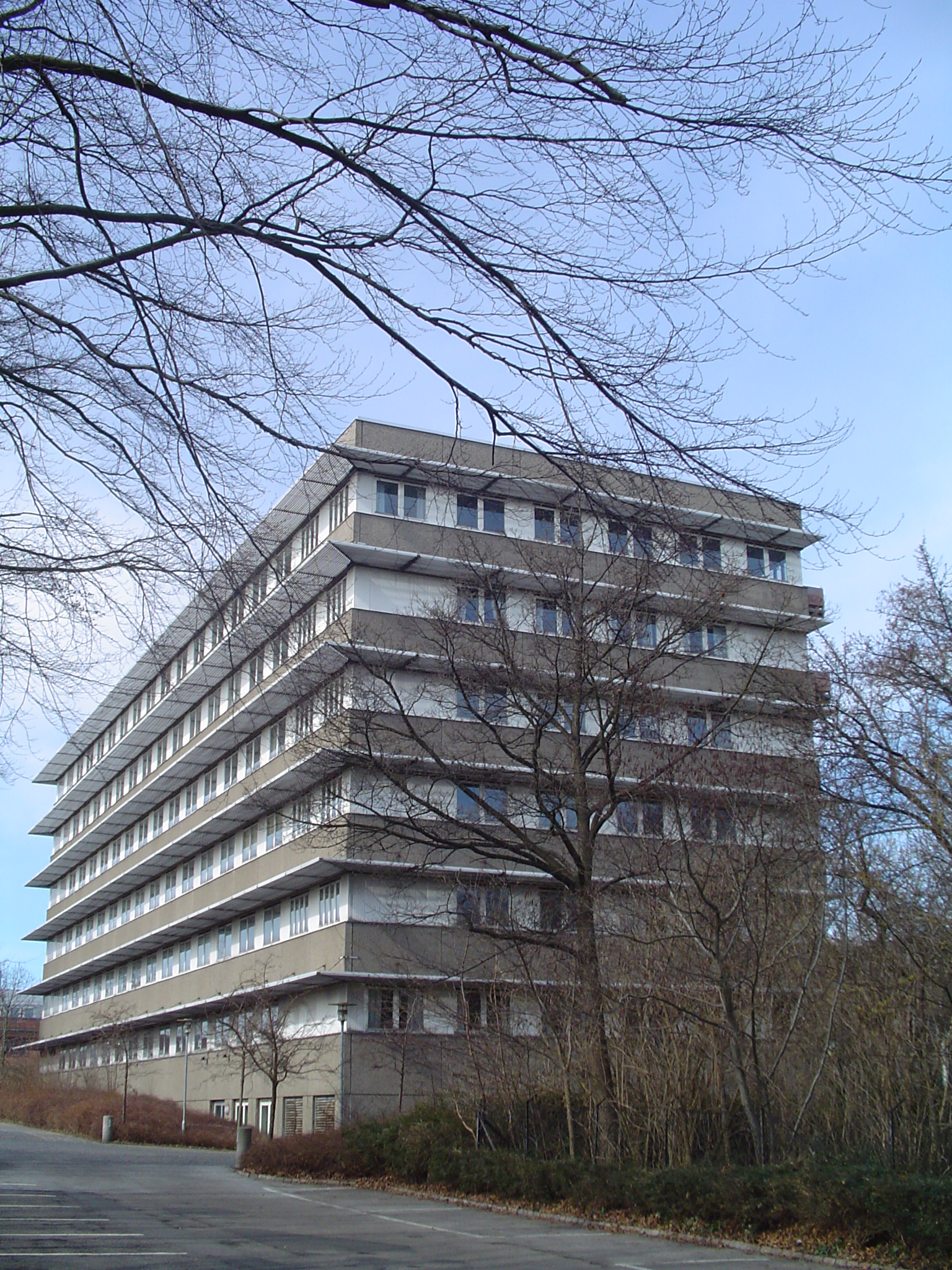
The August Krogh Building

The August Krogh Building (formerly referred to as the August Krogh Institute) is a building that is used by the Department of Biology. It is named after August Krogh (1874–1949), who contributed a number of fundamental discoveries within several fields of physiology, and is famous for developing the Krogh Principle. The building is located near the Department of Computer Science.

==== Hans Christian Ørsted Building ====
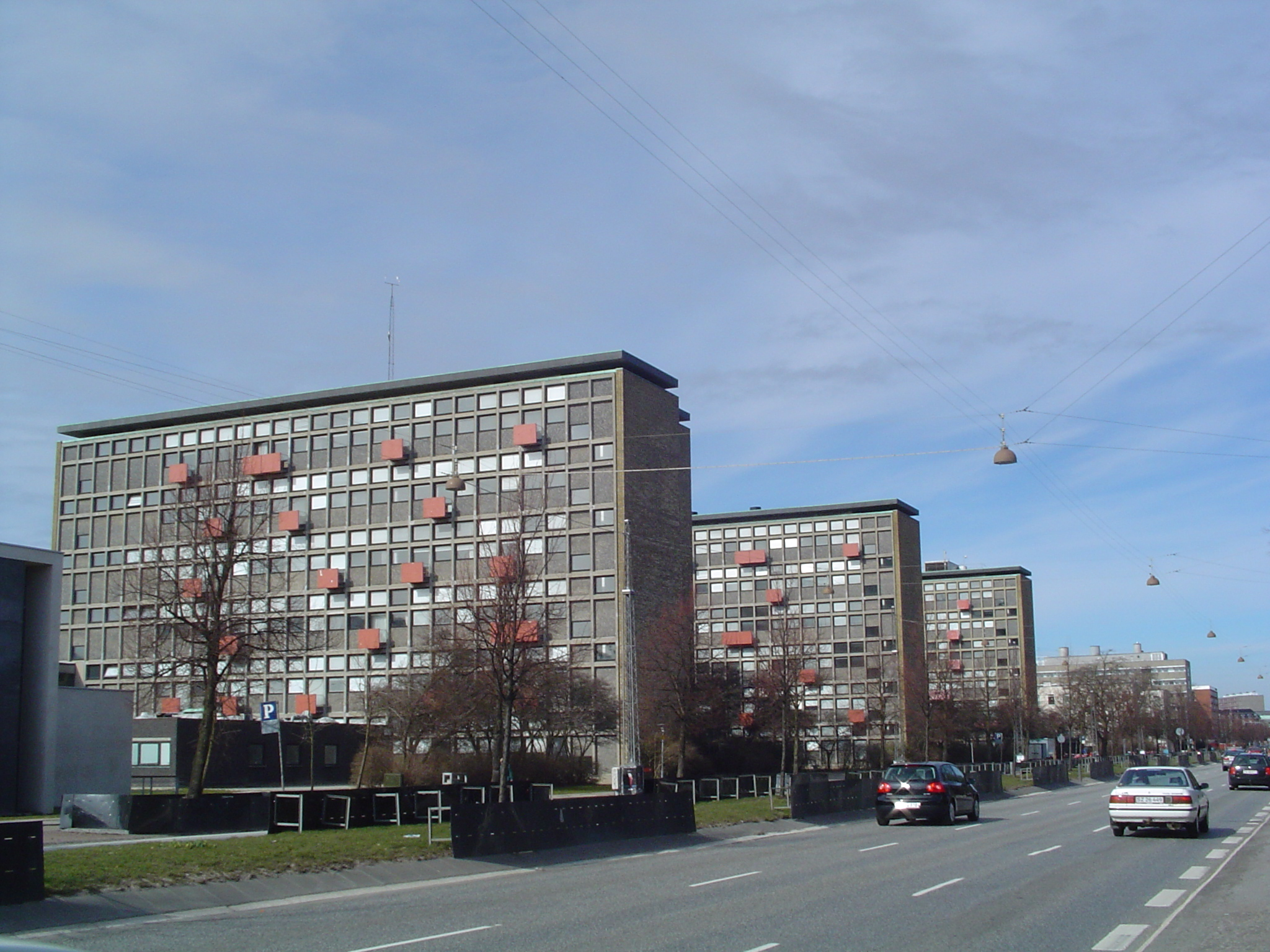
Buildings D, C and B (left to right) of the interconnected Hans Christian Ørsted Building complex, as seen from Nørre Allé

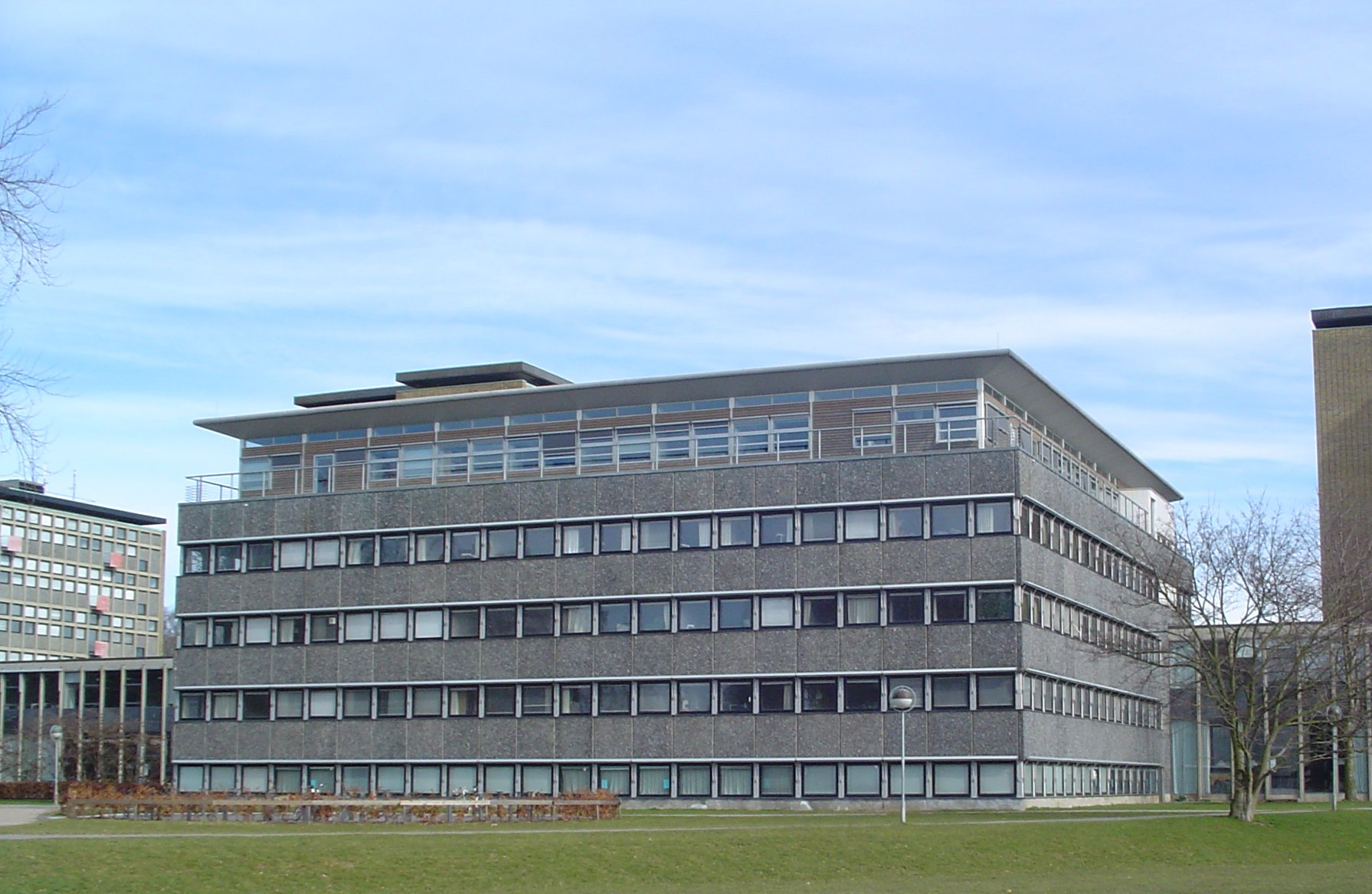
Building E of the interconnected Hans Christian Ørsted Building complex, which holds the Department of Mathematical Sciences

The Hans Christian Ørsted Building (informally abbreviated HCØ and formerly named the Hans Christian Ørsted Institute) is an interconnected building complex that houses the departments of mathematics and chemistry, as well as part of the Niels Bohr Institute. It is named after the physicist Hans Christian Ørsted (1777–1851), who discovered electromagnetism (1820) and was the first to isolate aluminium (1825).

The complex is made up of five connected buildings: A, B, C, D and E.

Building A is a long connecting building, it has ground, first floor and basement level and holds the auditoria.

Building B is a five floor building, and holds facilities for inorganic (ground, first and second level) and organic chemistry (3rd, fourth and fifth level). In the basement of the building is a mass spectrometry apparatus. Building C is a five floor building similar to building B and holds the sections for theoretical chemistry and spectroscopy. Building D is a five floor building similar to B and C, but this is dedicated to physics and is as such part of the Niels Bohr Institute. It holds the Ørsted Laboratory.

Building E is another type building, not as large as the other three. It holds the Department of Mathematical Sciences.

== Panum Building ==
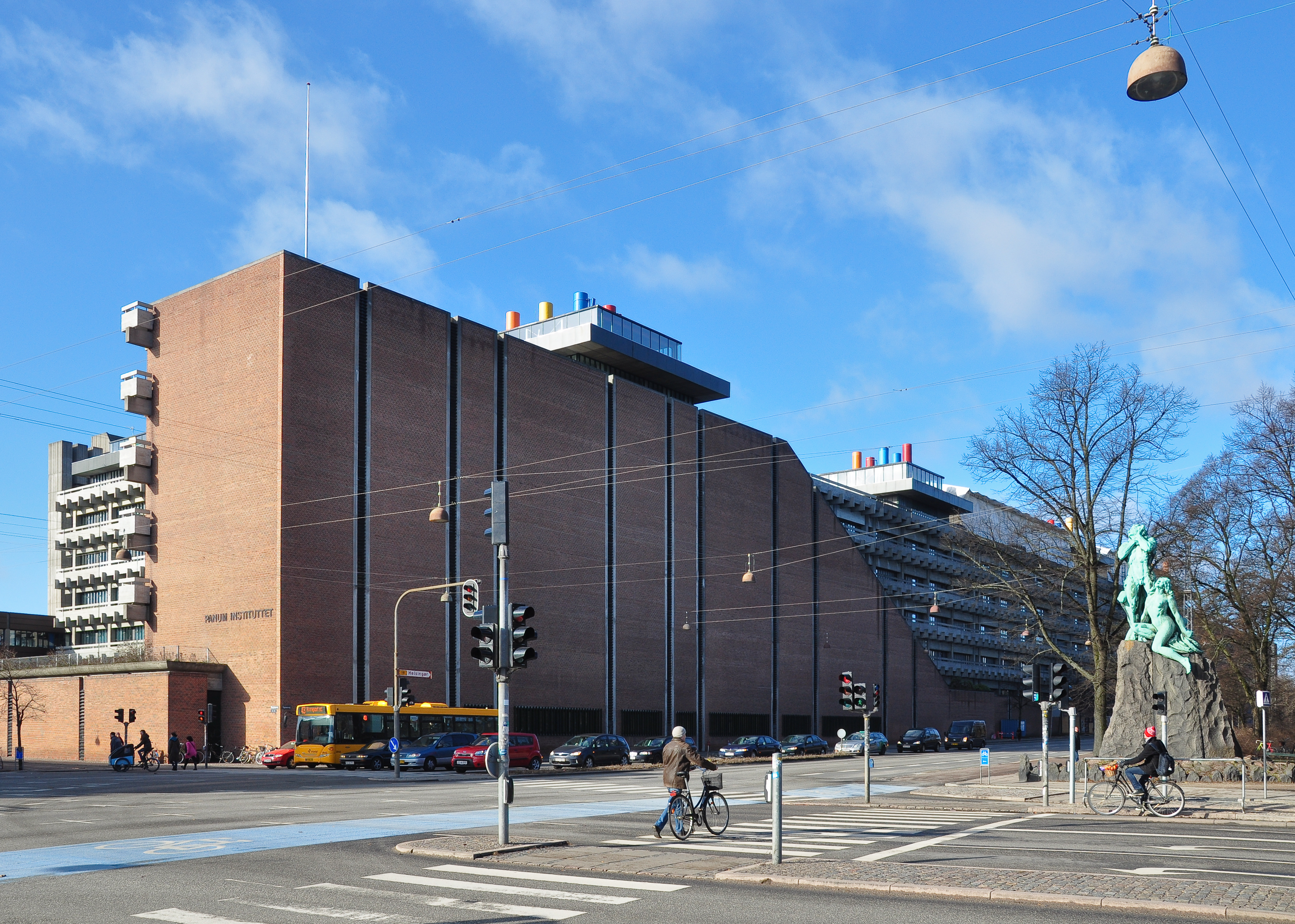
The Panum Building, as seen across the Blegdamsvej-Tagensvej intersection from the east

The Panum Building (formerly referred to as the Panum Institute) is the Faculty of Health and Medical Sciences' largest building complex and houses six of the Faculty's thirteen departments. Panum contains the Faculty's shared administration and building services offices as well as a library, two canteens, lecture halls, classrooms, study rooms, laboratories, student clubs, a bookshop, and part of the Animal Research Unit. The Panum Building also houses the largest dental clinic in Denmark with approximately 230 treatment chairs. The building was named after Danish physiologist Peter Ludvig Panum (1820–1885).

The Panum Building was built from 1971 to 1986 by the architects Eva and Nils Koppel, Gert Edstrand, Poul Erik Thyrring and reflects Brutalism. The outside areas were designed by landscape architects Edith and Ole Nørgård. The artistic decoration and color schemes – e.g. the characteristic chimneys – were envisioned by Tonning Rasmussen. In parts of the basement, there are murals made by Poul Gernes.

The Panum complex was first taken into use in 1975. The School of Oral Health Care moved to Panum in 1986.

== Satellite buildings ==
In addition to the North Campus, satellite buildings include the Teilum Building, which is located between Rigshospitalet and Fælledparken; the Niels Bohr Institute, which is located between Rigshospitalet and the headquarters of the Danish Order of Freemasons; and the Medical Museion, which is located near Amalienborg in central Copenhagen.

== Departments and institutes ==
Departments and institutes that are located at the North Campus:

- Faculty of Science
  - Department of Biology: Located at the Copenhagen Biocenter, August Krogh Building, and Universitetsparken 15.
  - Department of Chemistry: Located at the University Park.
  - Department of Computer Science: Located at the University Park.
  - Department of Mathematical Sciences: Located at the University Park.
  - Department of Nutrition, Exercise and Sports: Located at the University Park and at the Frederiksberg Campus.
  - Niels Bohr Institute: Located at Blegdamsvej 17. It also operates at the Rockefeller Komplekset, the University Park, and the City Campus.
- Faculty of Health and Medical Sciences
  - Department of Biomedical Sciences: The main part of the department is located at the Panum Building. The Section of Molecular Pathology is located at the Biotech Research and Innovation Centre (BRIC), which is part of the University Park.
  - Department of Cellular and Molecular Medicine: Located at the Panum Building.
  - Department of Clinical Medicine: Located at the Panum Building and at Rigshospitalet (Copenhagen University Hospital).
  - Department of Immunology and Microbiology: Partially located at the Panum Building. It also operates at Hvidovre Hospital and at the City Campus.
  - Department of Forensic Medicine: Located at the Teilum Building.
  - Department of Neuroscience and Pharmacology: Located at the Panum Building.
  - Department of Odontology: Located at the Panum Building.
  - Department of Pharmacy: Located at the University Park.
  - Department of Drug Design and Pharmacology: Located at the University Park.

== Transport ==
A BRT line operates between Nørreport station and Ryparken station, following Øster Voldgade, Sølvgade, Fredensborg, Tagensvej, Nørre Allé, Vibenshus Runddel to Lyngbyvej. It is served by up to 47 busses per hour per direction transporting approx. 30.000 passengers per day. The campus is also located almost midway between two metro stations (Nørrebros Runddel to the west and Trianglen to the east) of the City Circle Line.
