= UCPH School of Pharmaceutical Sciences =

School of Pharmaceutical Sciences
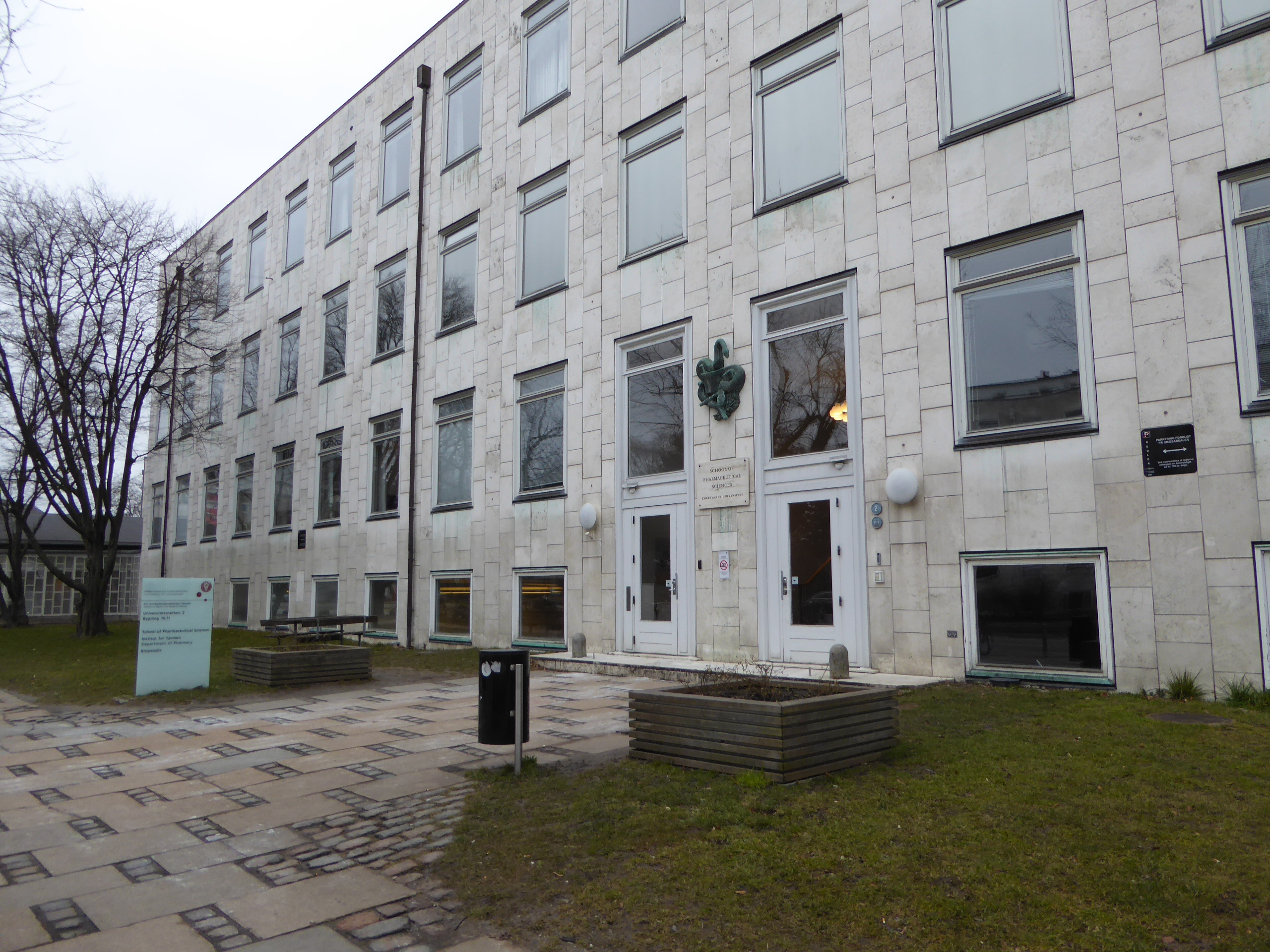
- School of Pharmaceutical Sciences in Copenhagen.
- Type: Pharmacy school
- Established: 2012
- Parent institution: University of Copenhagen
- Director: Susan Weng Larsen
- Location: Copenhagen, Denmark
- Website: pharmaschool.ku.dk/english/

The UCPH School of Pharmaceutical Sciences is part of the Faculty of Health and Medical Sciences at University of Copenhagen (UCPH). It is located at the university's North Campus on the border between Nørrebro and Østerbro. The school is organized in two departments.

== History ==
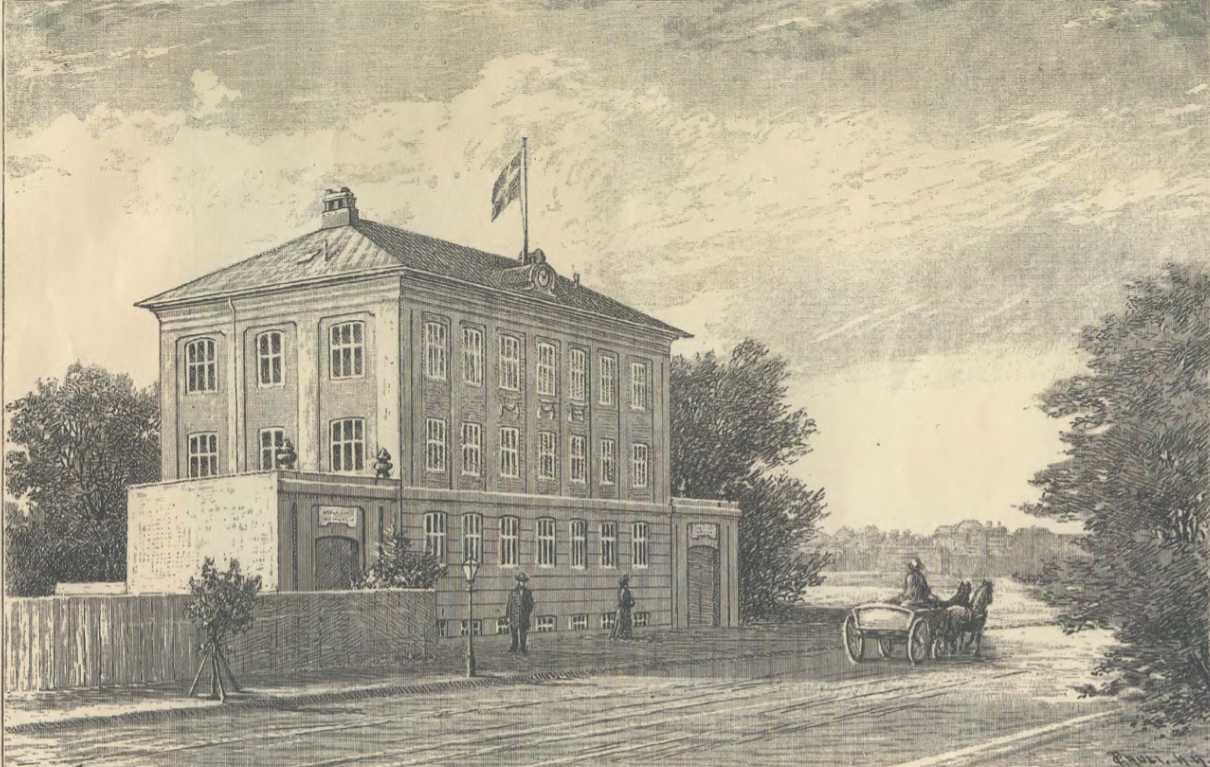
The new Pharmaceutical College in Stockholmsgade

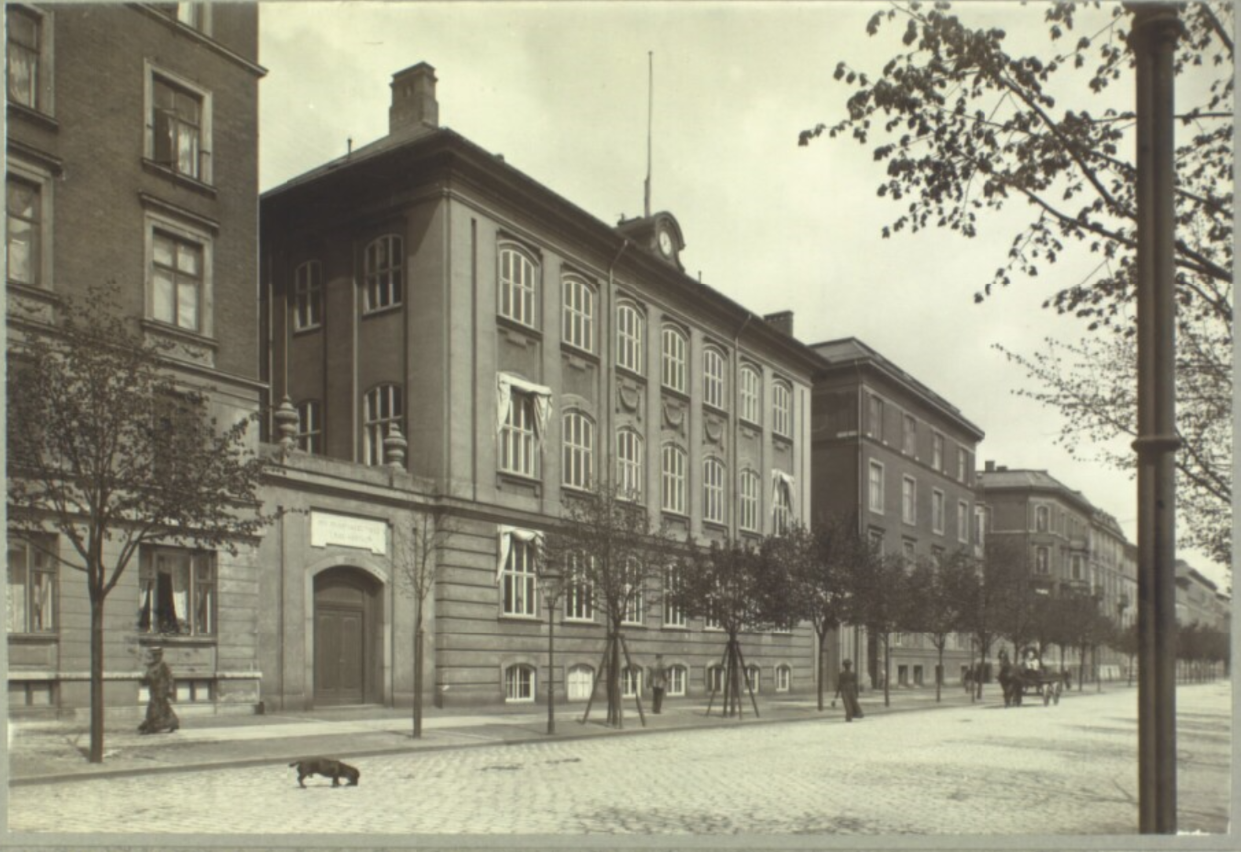
The same scene later

The Pharmaceutical College (Danish: Den Farmaceutiske Læreanstalt) was founded in 1892 as a private initiative of Christian Ditlev Ammentorp Hansen. He acquired a site in Stockholmsgade and charged Andreas Clemmesen with the design of a building. Construction began in 1891 and the school opened in 1892.

The first professor was appointed in 1936, the dr.pharm. degree was introduced in 1942 and the lic.pharm. degree was introduced in 1945. The school outgrew its premises in Stockholmsgade (No. 28) the late 1930s. In 1942, the Pharmaceutical College relocated to its current building in the University Park and changed its name to the Danish Pharmaceutical College (Danmarks Farmaceutiske Højskole).

Its name was changed to Danmarks Farmaceutiske Universitet (DFU) in 2003. On 1 January 2007, DFU was merged into the University of Copenhagen and was renamed as the Faculty of Pharmaceutical Sciences (Farmaceutiske Fakultet, abbr. FARMA). Its current name was introduced in 2012 when it became a school under the Faculty of Health and Medical Sciences.

== Building ==
The school is located at Universitetsparken 2. Its building from 1942 was designed by Kaj Gottlob. The school was expanded with a new Pharma Science Building designed by Cf. Møller Architects in 2015. The four-storey building has a total floor area of 5,130 and contains new laboratories. It is joined to existing buildings by a tall, glazed atrium to the north and to by an indoor walkway to the south. It is clad with tombac panels in a rhomboid pattern on three sides.

== Programmes ==
- MSc programmes
- BSc and MSc programmes in Danish
- Continuing and professional education - part-time master programmes

In Danish

- Bachelor of Science (BSc) – 3-year programme in Danish
- Master of Science (MSc) – 2-year programme in Danish

Drug Research Academy (DRA)

The Drug Research Academy is a graduate programme in pharmaceutical sciences under the Graduate School of Health and Medical Sciences

In English

MSc programmes

- Medicinal Chemistry
- Pharmaceutical Sciences

== Library ==
The school has its own library, UCPH Pharmaceutical Sciences Library, which holds a collection of new and old books, magazines and provides access to numerous databases. The library is part of the CULIS collaboration between the Royal Library and the libraries at the University of Copenhagen).

== See also ==
- Pharmakon—Danish College of Pharmacy Practice
