= University of Copenhagen Center for the Philosophy of Nature and Science Studies =

The Centre for the Philosophy of Nature and Science Studies (Danish: Center for Naturfilosofi og Videnskabsstudier, abbr. CNV) involves a small group of scientists, philosophers of science, and researchers at the University of Copenhagen. It was founded in 1994. It engages in the interdisciplinary field denominated as the philosophy of nature and science studies, including history, philosophy and sociology of science. It operates under the Department of Science Education at the Faculty of Science.
