= Peter Meyn =

Danish architect

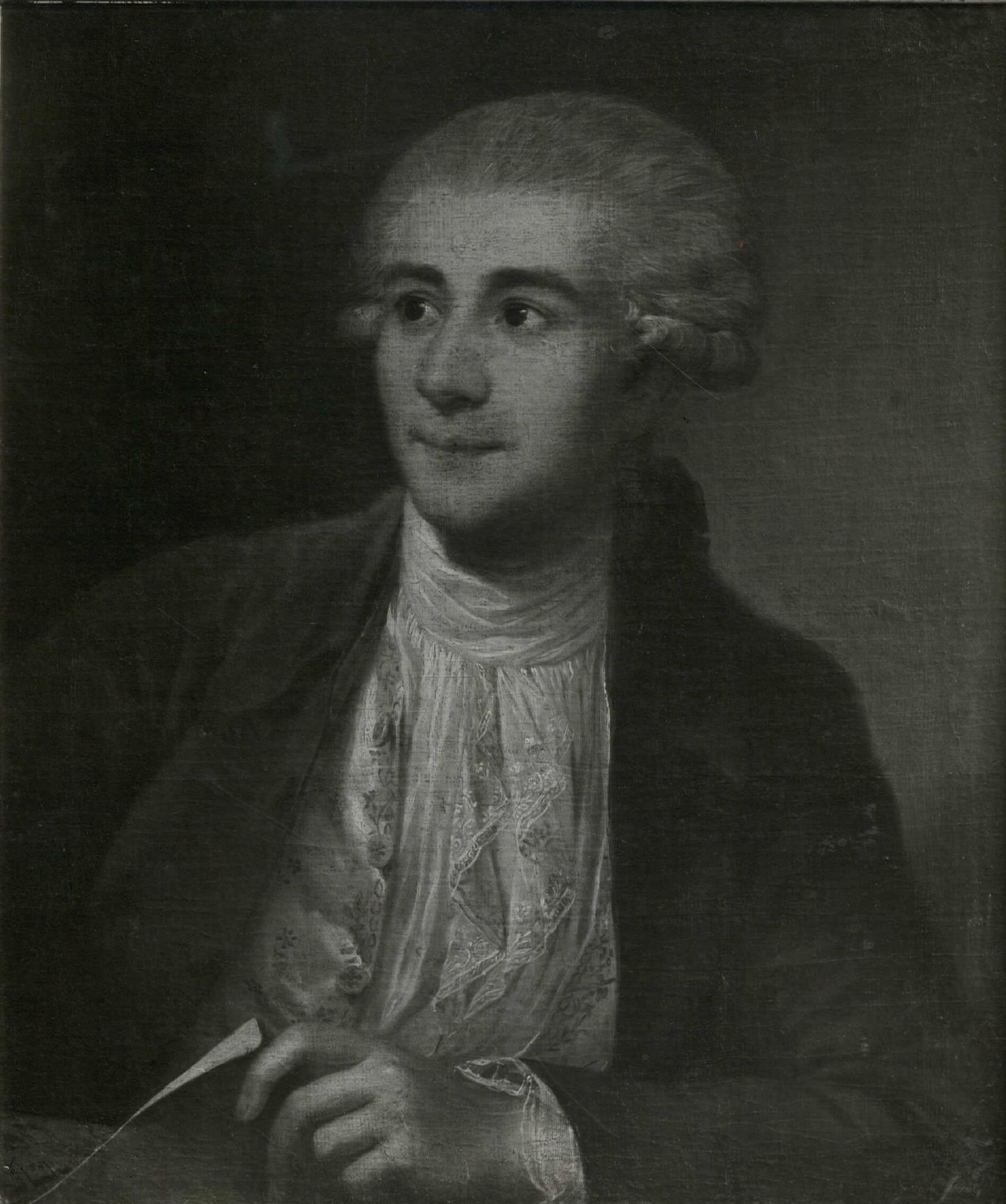
- Meyn painted by Erik Pauelsen
- Born: 8 April 1749; Copenhagen, Denmark
- Died: 11 April 1808 (aged 59)
- Occupation: Architect
- Buildings: Royal Surgical Institute, Copenhagen

Peter Meyn (8 April 1749 - 11 April 1808) was a Danish architect.

== Early life and education ==
Meyn was born in Copenhagen, the son of master joiner Anton (Anthoni) Christian Meyn (1712–82) and Helena Klefts (c. 1714–80). He studied at the Royal Danish Academy of Fine Arts where he won the small gold medal in 1767 and the large gold medal in 1768 with a project for a royal military academy. The large gold medal qualified him for the first vacant travel stipend. He worked for Caspar Frederik Harsdorff on the marble baths in Frederiksberg Palace (1770) and as executing architect on Frederick V's Chapel at Roskilde Cathedral. In 1777, when Nicolai Abildgaard had returned to Denmark, Meyn finally went abroad to further his education, spending most of the time in Paris and Rome. He returned to Denmark in 1782 and became a member of the Royal Academy in 1783.

== Career ==
In 1783, Meyn was appointed to building inspector. He was appointed to second professor at the Academy in 1783 and to first professor in 1799. He served as acting master builder (konstitueret bygmester) for the Navy in 1785–88. In 1789, he was both appointed to master builder for the City of Copenhagen and to royal master builder.

== Personal life ==
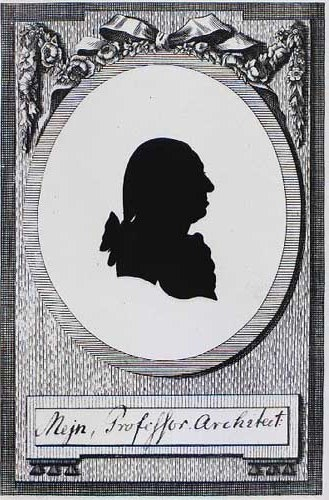
Silhouette portrait of Meyn-

1783, Meyn was married to Mette Marie Jensen (1763–1785), a daughter of Peder Jensen and Anne Marie née Reimer. After her death in 1786, he was second time married to Charlotte Amalie Avemann (1763–1830), a daughter of cellarman Johan Vilhelm Avemann and Charlotte Amalie née Svendsen.

He died on 11 April 1808 and is buried in Assistens Cemetery. He was survived by the son Johan Wilhelm Meyn (1787) and the daughter Mette Marie Meyn (1788).

== List of works ==
- Kurantbanken, partly to Harsdorff's design (1785–86, demolished in . 1870)
- Surgical Academy, Bredgade 62, Copenhagen (1785–87)
- Nyboders Hovedvagt, Gammel Vagt 6, Copenhagen (1787)
- Warehouse for the Admiralty, Bremerholm (1795)
- Pavilions and fence surrounding Rosenborg Castle Gardens, Kronprinsessegade, Copenhagen (1803–05)
- Wall of Assistens Cemetery, Copenhagen (1805)
- Druknehuset at Langebro, Cpåemjagen (1806, demolished)
- Wall of Assistens Cemetery, Nørrebrogade, Copenhagen
- Adaption of Sorgenfri Palace, Copenhagen (1791–94)

=== Unrealized projects ===
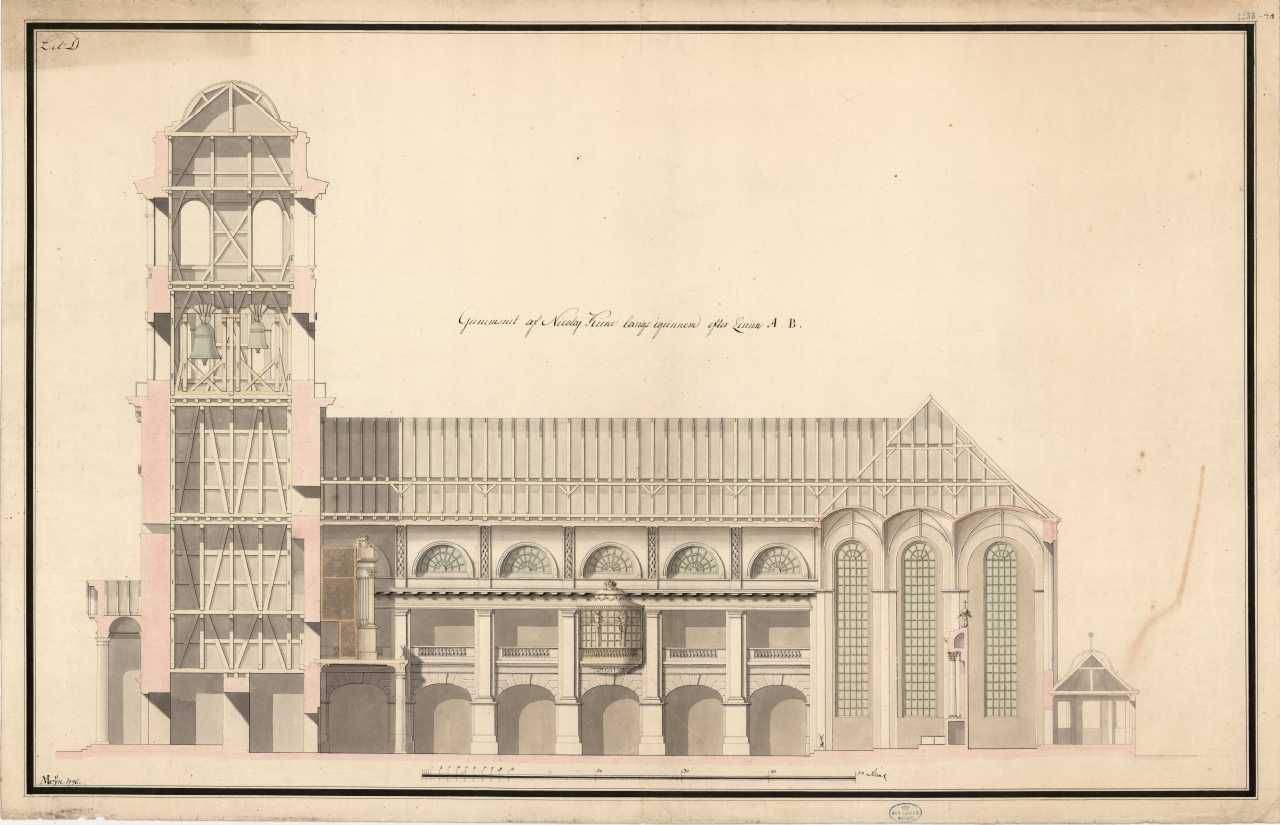
Proposal for rebuilding of St. Nicolas' Church, 1797

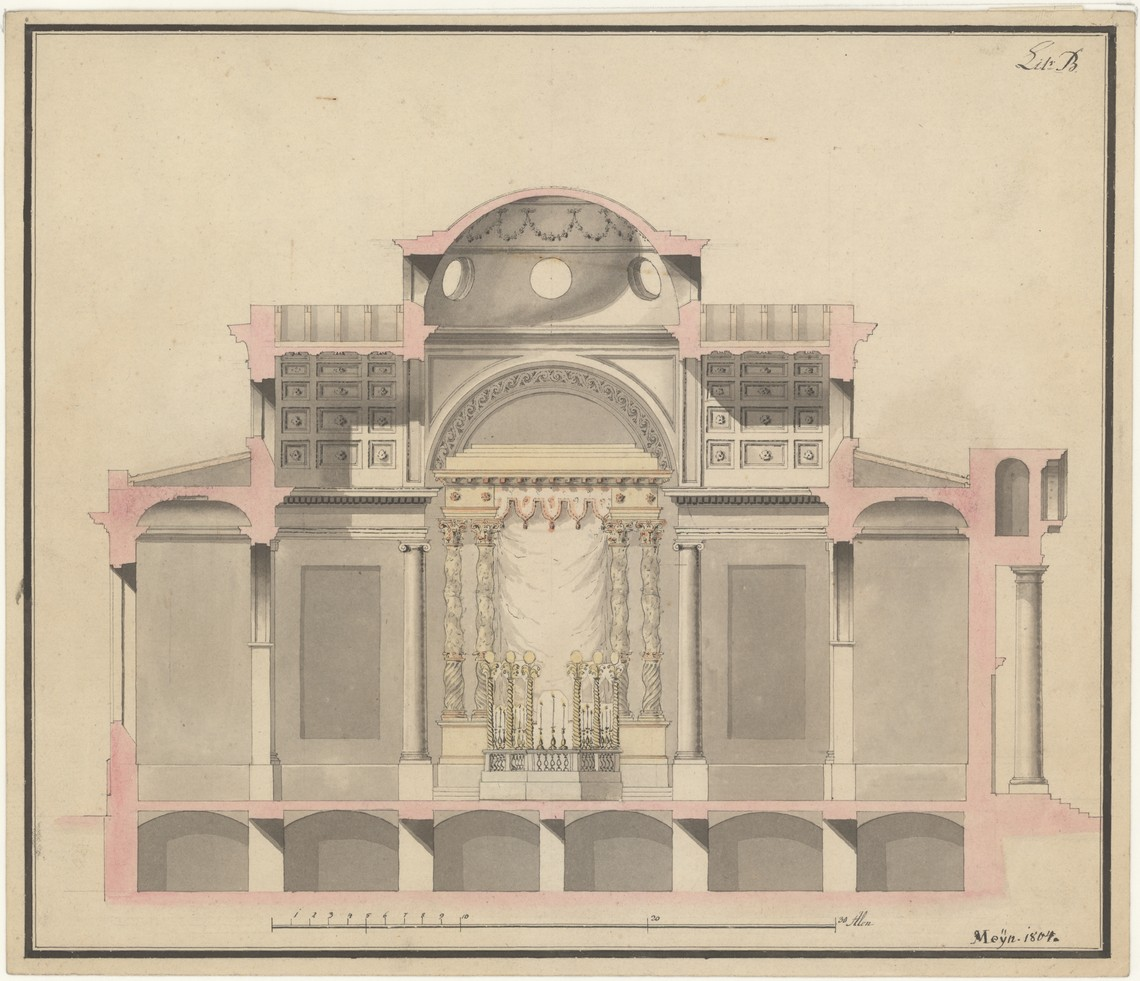
Proposal for a synagogue, 1804–05

- A Royal Military Academy for 100 Officvers (1768, st)
- Pont Triomphal (1779)
- Kirurgisk Akad. (som forannævnte)
- A public library (1783, admission piece to the Art Academy)
- Rebuilding of St. Nicolas' Church, Copenhagen (ypwer 1796)
- Plan for rebuilding of the city after the Copenhagen Fire of 1795 (with J.H. Rawert), 1795)
- Restoration of the Church of the Holy Ghost, Copenhagen (1797); possibly the now-demolished wall towards Amagertorv and Valkendorffsgade)
- Vajsenshus, Copenhagen (1799)
- Rebuilding of Christiansborg Palace (1800)
- Synagoge, Copenhagen (1804–05)
- Monument to Peder Tordenskjold, Holmens Kanal (1788, 1790–91)
- Grave monument to Marie Schiønning (c. 1797, attributed)
- Adaption of the interior of Frederiksborg Latin School, Hillerød (1806)
