= Hortense Panum =

Danish music historian (1856–1933)

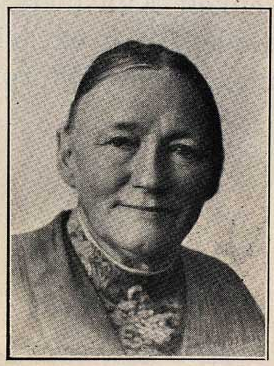
Hortense Panum

Hortense Charlotte Anine Panum (1856–1933) was a Danish music historian who taught in the early 20th century at the Danish Folk University and the Royal Danish Academy of Music. Among her publications were the first volume of Illustreret Musikhistorie (Illustrated History of Music, 1897) and Middelalderens Strengeinstrumenter og deres Forløbere i Oldtiden (1928), published in English as The Stringed Instruments of the Middle Ages: Their Evolution and Development. In 1898, together with the composer Louis Glass, she founded the Dansk Musikpædagogisk Forening (Danish Music Education Association).

== Early life and education ==
Born in Kiel, Germany, on 14 March 1856, Hortense Charlotte Anine Panum was the daughter of Peter Ludvig Panum (1820–1885) and Hortense Susanne née Hagen (1826–1899). She spent her early childhood in Kiel where her father, a physiologist, taught at the university. Faced by anti-Danish sentiment in Germany, the family moved to Copenhagen where her father became a professor at the university in 1864.

While her brother Peter followed in his father's footsteps as a physician, Hortense Panum turned to music, taking piano lessons under Victor Bendix and August Winding while studying theory and composition under Orla Rosenhoff. In 1886, she went to Berlin to study music history under Wilhelm Tappert. She subsequently widened her knowledge of the subject by visiting libraries and museums in Germany, France, Belgium and Scandinavia.

== Career and publications ==
Panum began lecturing on music history in 1885, later arranging concerts at the end of her talks to present the music she had reviewed. In 1898, she was appointed as a teacher of theory and music history at Copenhagen's Glass Conservatory. In 1904, she lectured at the Folk University and from 1907 to 1931 she taught music history and musicology at the Royal Danish Academy of Music.

In 1898, together with Louis Glass, she established the Music Education Association, which she managed from 1901 to 1903. Her writings included Nordeuropas gamle Strengeinstumenter (Northern Europe's Old Stringed Instruments, 1903), De folkelige Strengeinstrumenter i Nordens Middelalder (Popular Stringed Instruments in the North's Middle Ages, 1905). Her most important work was Middelalderens Strengeinstrumenter og deres Forløbere i Oldtiden (1928), published in English in 1939 as The Stringed Instruments of the Middle Ages: Their Evolution and Development.

In later life, she took a special interest in the old Norwegian instrument, the langeleik, which she tried to reintroduce in Denmark, persuading Carl Nielsen to compose a few pieces for the instrument. In 1930, she attempted unsuccessfully to promote further interest through a radio broadcast.

Hortense Panum died in Copenhagen on 26 April 1933 and was buried in the Garrison Cemetery.
