= Eva Koppel =

Danish architect (1916–2006)

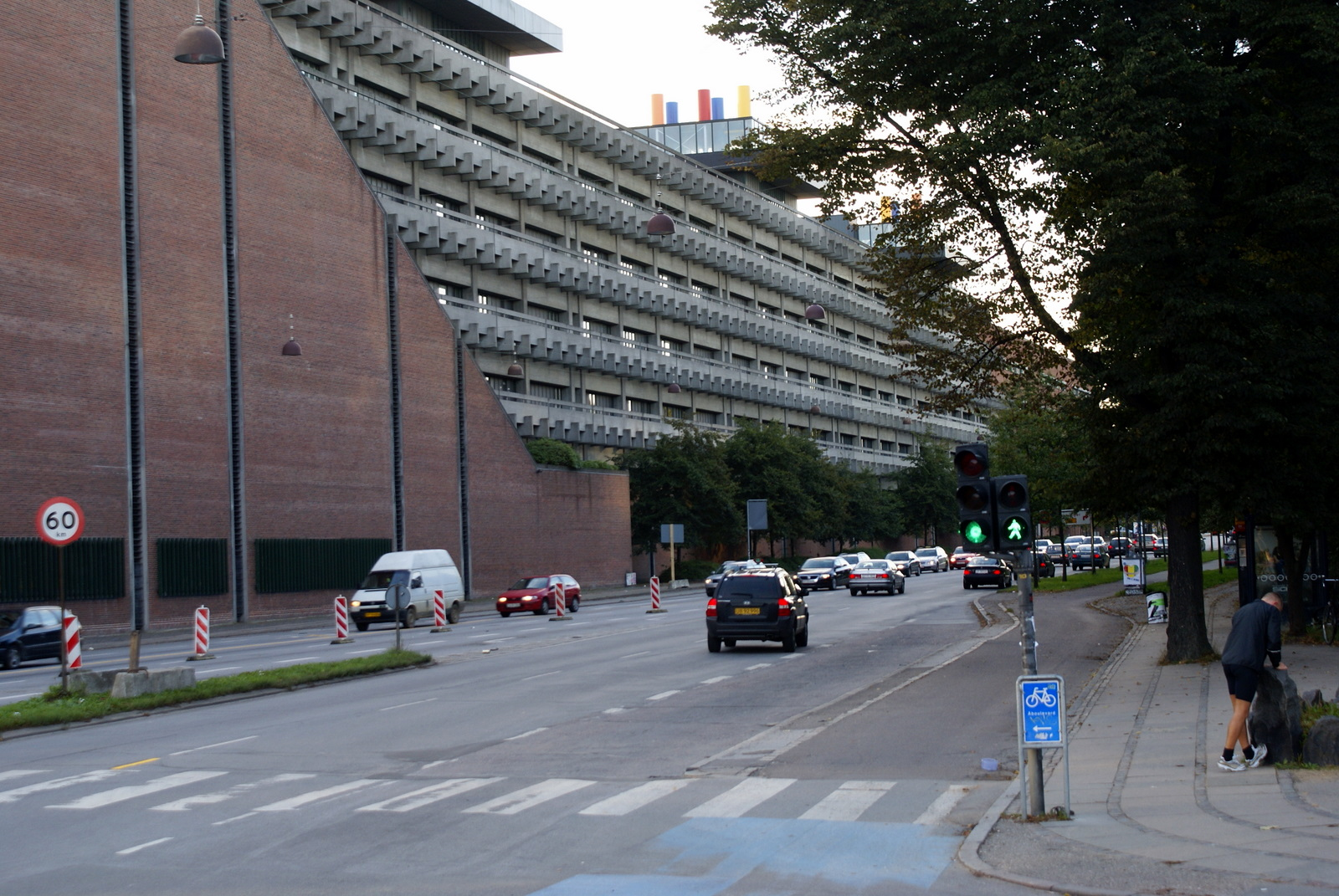
Eva and Nils Koppel: Panum Building (completed 1986)

Eva Koppel née Ditlevsen (1 January 1916 – 2 August 2006) was a Danish architect who together with her husband Nils ran one of Denmark's largest architectural firms (KKET, later KKE).

== Biography ==
The daughter of a bank director, Eva Koppel was educated at the Danish Academy in Copenhagen (1935–1941). She married the architect Nils Koppel in 1936 and together they worked in Alvar Aalto's studio in Finland (1938–1939) and later joined him in Stockholm 1943–1945) before establishing their own studio in 1946. Initially, they designed simply styled single-family homes including Henning Koppel's house in Birkerød and their own home in Gentofte (1946] which is listed.

Their breakthrough came with Langeliniepavillonen (the Langelinie Pavilion) in 1957. They were subsequently known for their large public buildings and restoration projects including the Hans Christian Ørsted Institute in Copenhagen (1955–1962), the Technical University of Denmark in Lundtofte (1961–1975), the Panum Building in Copenhagen (1966–1986), and the South Campus of the University of Copenhagen on Amager (1972–1979). All these buildings were designed in the Brutalist style. In addition, they contributed to the Statens Museum for Kunst (1966–1970).

In 1955, Eva Koppel was awarded the Eckersberg Medal. From 1951 to 1973, she was vice-chairman of the board for the Design School for Women (Tegne- og Kunstindustriskolen for Kvinder), and in 1972 she became a member of the Academy. In addition to her architectural work, she is remembered as being musical and creative as well as a competent administrator.
