= Panum Building =

Coordinates: 55°41′37″N 12°33′50″E

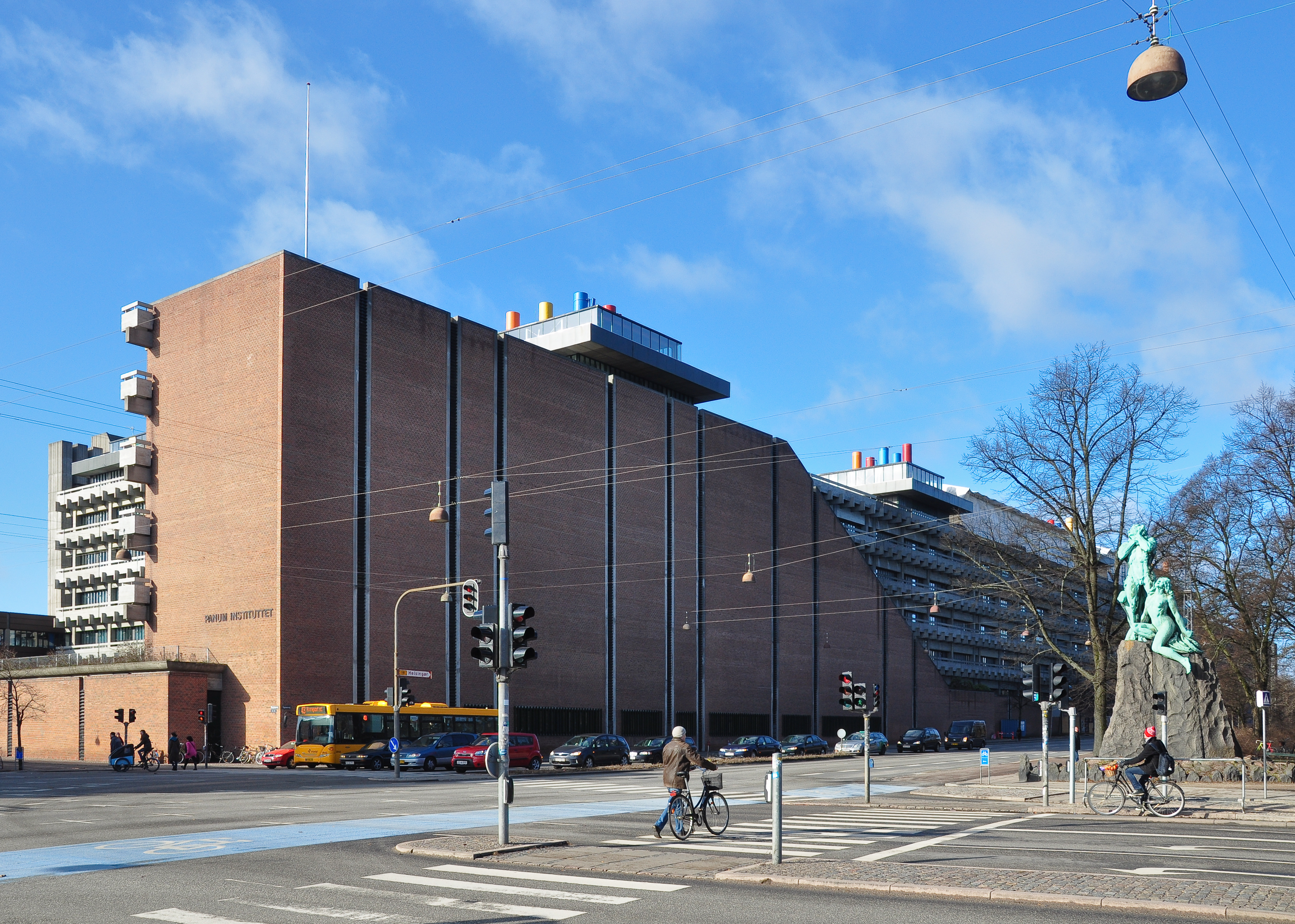
The Panum Building (2012)

The Panum Building (formerly referred to as the Panum Institute) is a large building complex that is part of the University of Copenhagen's North Campus in Copenhagen, Denmark. It houses the Faculty of Health and Medical Sciences. This includes the Dental School and the Faculty of Medicine as well as The School of Oral Health Care and The School for Dental Technicians.

The Panum Building has many facilities including a library, two canteens, lecture theatres, offices, student clubs and a bookshop. The Panum Building also houses the largest dental clinic in Denmark with approximately 230 treatment chairs. The building was named after Danish physiologist Peter Ludvig Panum (1820–1885).

== Construction ==
The Panum Building was built from 1971 to 1986 by the architects Eva and Nils Koppel, Gert Edstrand, Poul Erik Thyrring and reflects Brutalism. The outside areas were designed by landscape architects Edith and Ole Nørgård. The artistic decoration, color scheme and characteristic chimneys were envisioned by Tonning Rasmussen. Parts of the basement have murals by Poul Gernes.

The Panum complex was first taken into use in 1975. The School of Oral Health Care moved to Panum in 1986.

=== Maersk Tower ===
In 2012, construction began on an extension of Panum, called the Maersk Tower. The tower was inaugurated on January 18, 2017. The Panum complex grew from 105 000 square meters to 140 000 square meters. The approximately 42 700 new square meters are primarily dedicated to research and educational activities, canteen and bicycle parking facilities. On the top floor, the public can access an observation platform.
