= UCPH Department of Mathematical Sciences =

Coordinates: 55.7004°N 12.5606°E

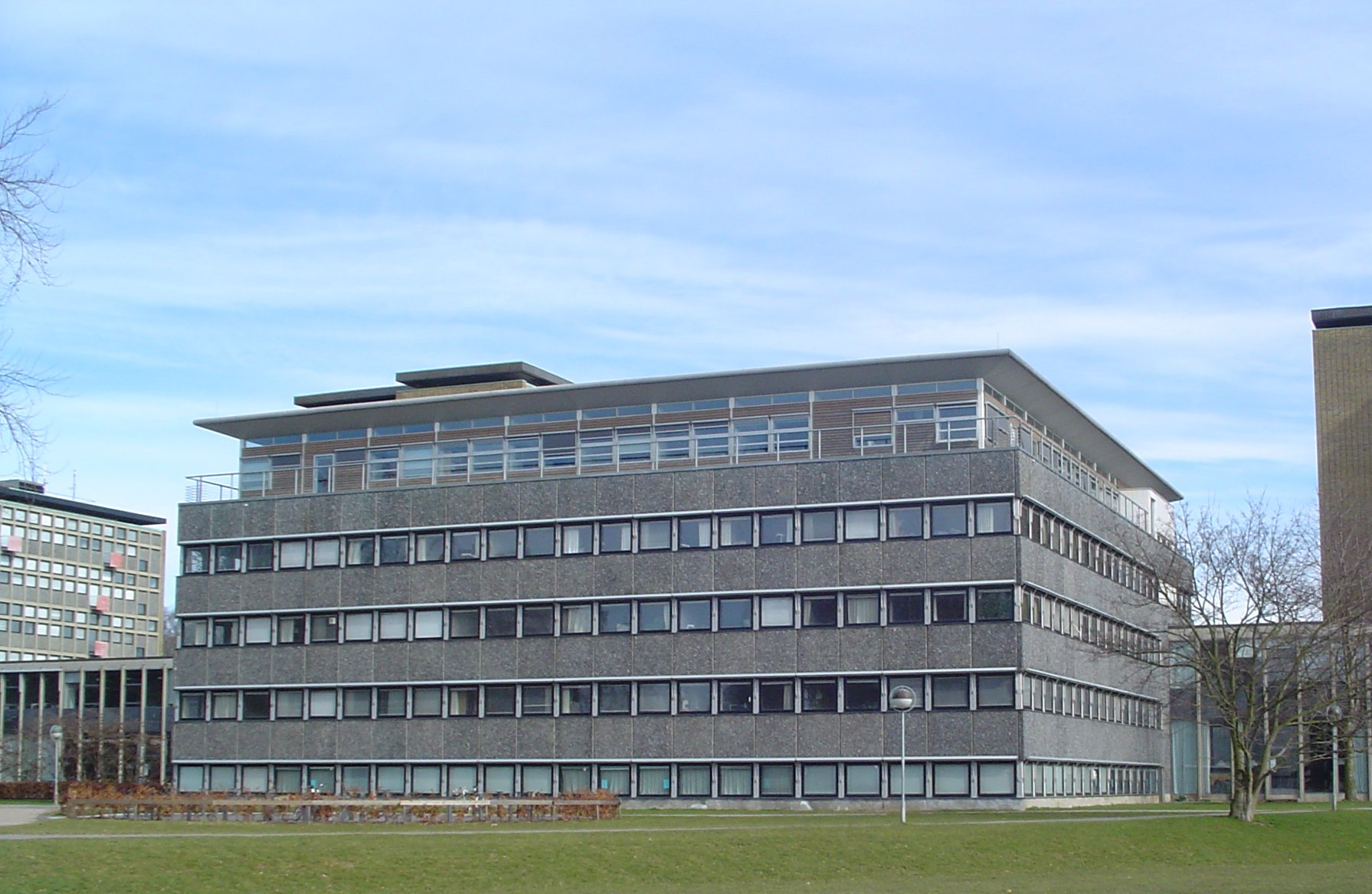
Department of Mathematical Sciences

The UCPH Department of Mathematical Sciences (Danish: Institut for Matematiske Fag) is a department under the Faculty of Science at the University of Copenhagen (UCPH). The department is based at the university's North Campus in Copenhagen.

== Location ==
The department is located in the E building of the Hans Christian Ørsted Institute, on Universitetsparken 5 in Copenhagen, Denmark.

From the founding of the University of Copenhagen in 1479, mathematics had been part of the Faculty of Philosophy. In 1850 it was moved to the new faculty of Mathematics and Natural Sciences. The Institute for Mathematical Sciences was first created in 1934 next to the Niels Bohr Institute building, when Carlsberg Foundation donated money for a building in celebration of the 450th anniversary of the University of Copenhagen in 1929. In 1963 the institute moved to its current location.

== Mathematical research ==
Many different branches of mathematics are being covered by the fields of interest of different researchers at the institute.

Harald Bohr, the brother of physicist Niels Bohr, is one famous alumnus of the department; his research in harmonic analysis and almost periodic functions in the 1930s laid the foundation for a huge drive in analysis. Most notably, since the 1980s the department has been a globally recognized frontrunner in functional analysis, particularly the study of operator algebras and C*-algebras. Faculty from the department who have contributed to this research include the following:

- Bent Fuglede
- Søren Eilers
- George Elliott
- Gert Kjærgaard Pedersen
- Ryszard Nest
- Richard V. Kadison

Contributing to these efforts, the department houses a center for non-commutative geometry.

Of other major research frontiers are homological algebra, and more recently - grounds have been laid for a boost in the research of algebraic topology.
