= Stockholmsgade =

Street in Copenhagen, Denmark

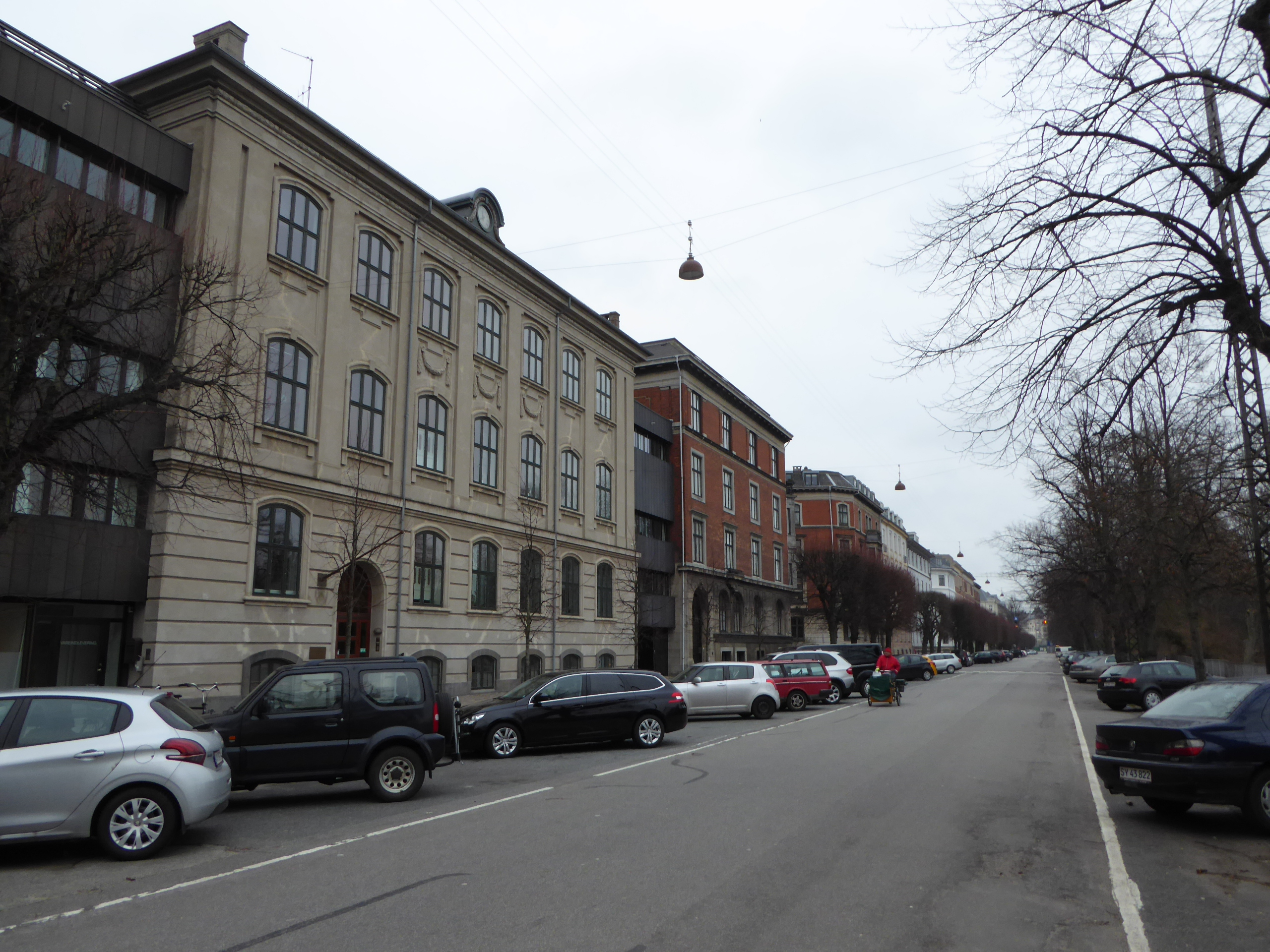
- Stockholmsgade, Copenhagen
- Length: 750 m (2,460 ft)
- Location: Indre By, Copenhagen, Denmark
- Postal code: 2100
- Nearest metro station: Østerport
- Coordinates: 55°41′26.52″N 12°34′43.32″E

Stockholmsgade (literally "Stockholm Street") is a mainly residential street in central Copenhagen, Denmark. It follows the northwestern margin of Østre Anlæg, linking Sølvtorvet in the southwest with Oslo Plads at Østerport station in the northeast. The Hirschsprung Collection, an art museum, is located on the street.

The Hirschsprung Collection's building (No. 20) is the only building situated on the park side of the street (even numbers). It was completed to a Neoclassical design by Hermann Baagøe Storck to house the personal art collection of Heinrich Hirschsprung.

== History ==
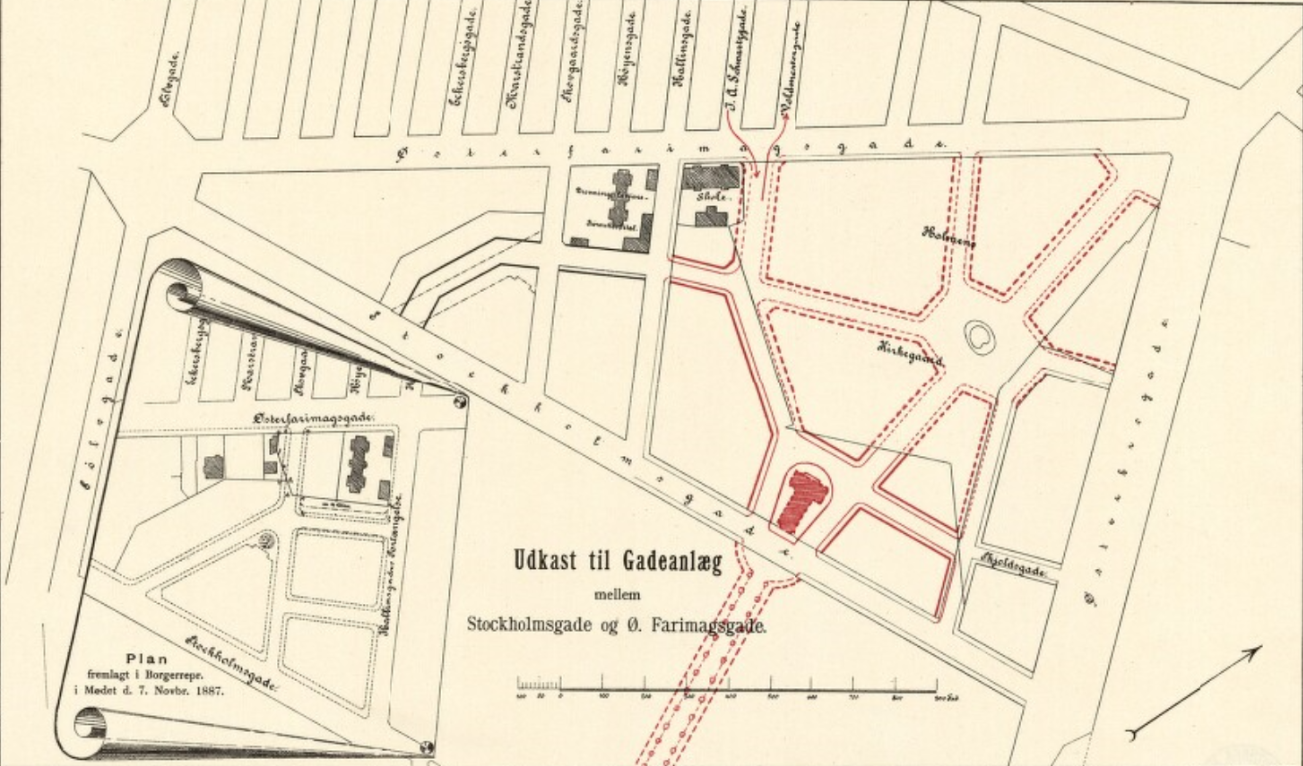
1889-90 plan for street layout in the area between Stockholmsgade and Øster Farimagsgade

The street is located on the former glacis outside the city's Fortification Ring. Østre Anlæg was created when the landscape architect Ole Høeg Hansen converted a section of the old East Rampart into an English-style landscape park in the 1870s. His initial plan was created in 1872 but progress on its implementation was slow and the northwestern margin of the park remained loosely defined.

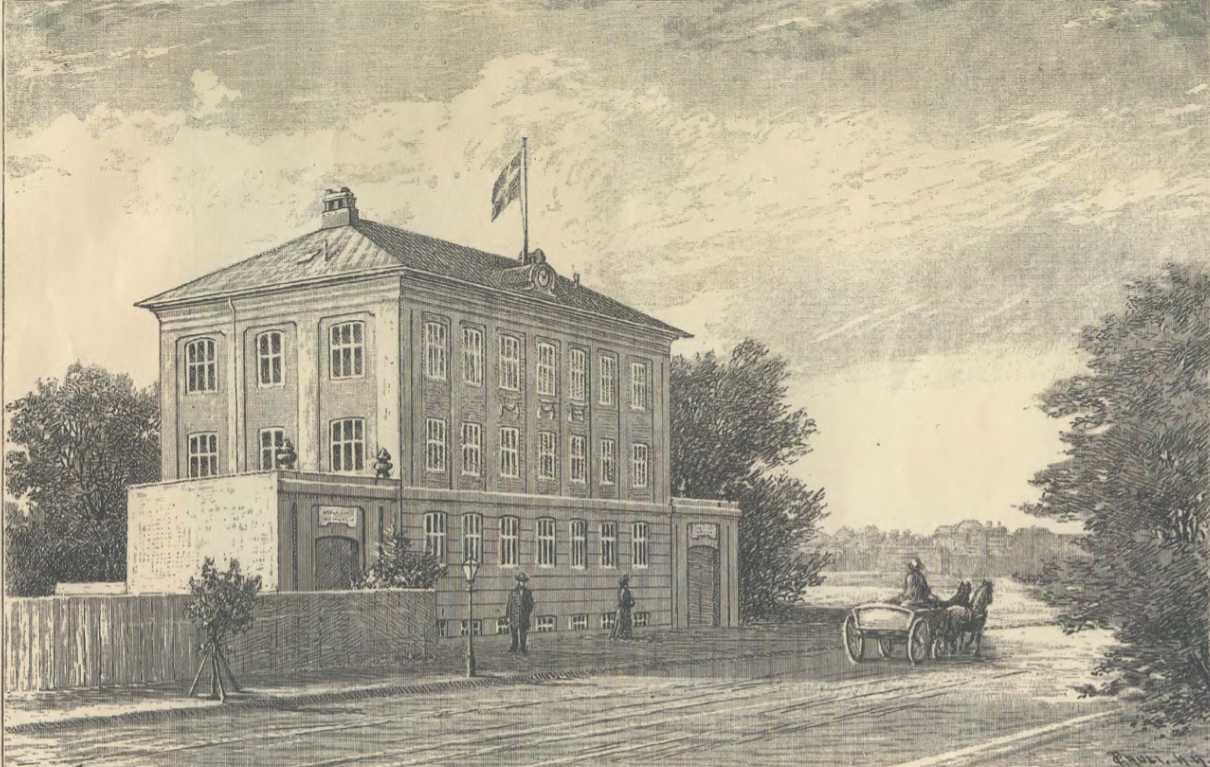
The new Pharmaceutical College in Stockholmsgade

In 1889–90, a plan was finally made for the layout of streets in the triangular area between the park, Øster Farimagsgade and Dag Hammarskjölds Allé. The new square Sølvtorvet on Sølvgade was established on the same occasion. Many of the buildings were high-end apartment buildings for the bourgeoisie. Lørups Ridehus, an equestrian centre, was built by Carl Albert Lørup in 1891. The complex included stables for 80 horses. The building was also used as a venue for events such as political meetings and society weddings. Viggo Hørup gave many of his speeches at Lørups Ridehus. The building was demolished in 1931 and replaced by a modern apartment building.

== Notable buildings and residents ==
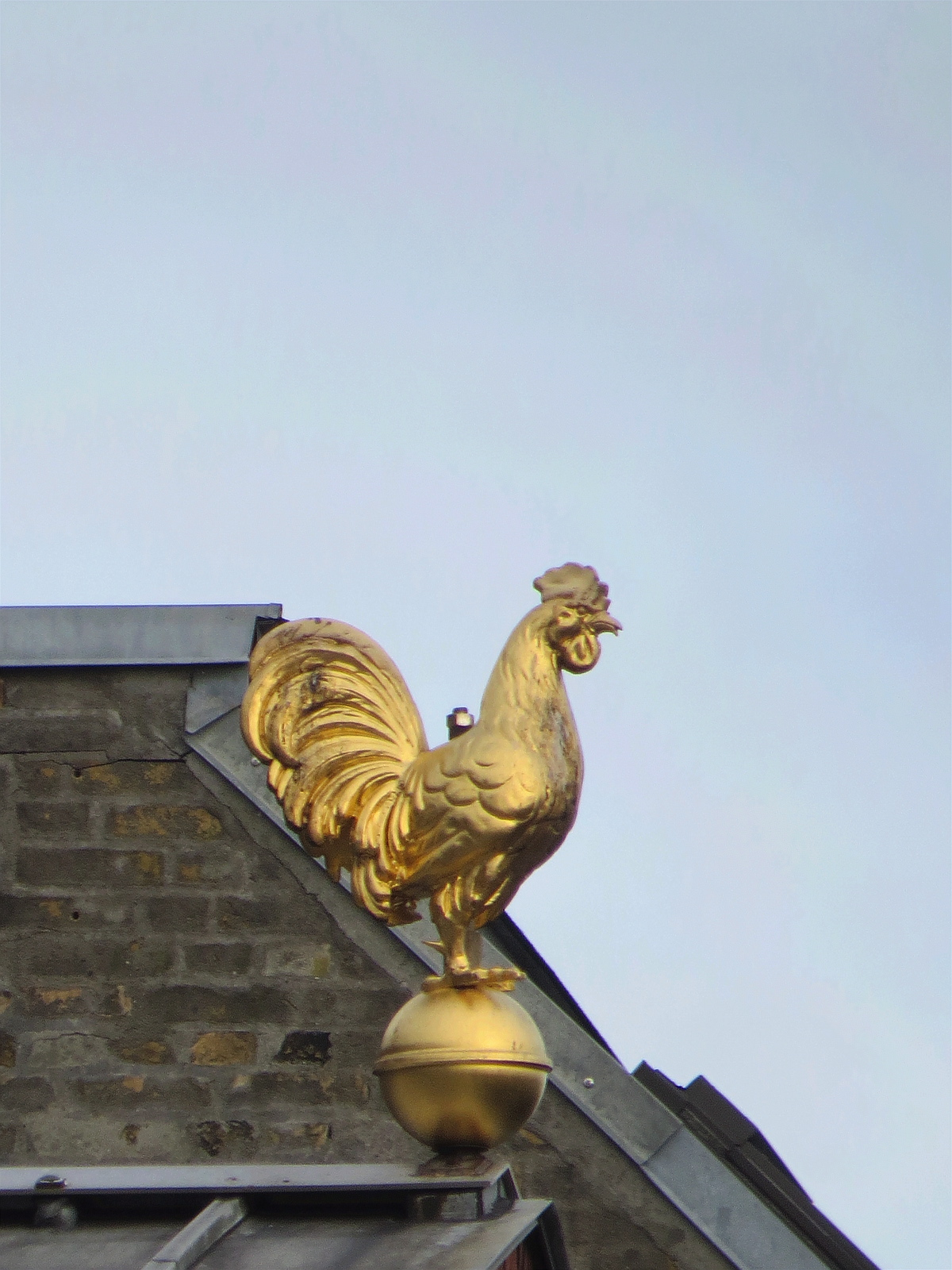
Gilded figure crowning Krebs' School

Krebs' School at No. 5–9 was established as a preparatory school for the Metropolitan School at Frue Plads. The building in Stockholmsgade is from 1878 and was designed by Charles Abrahams. Former students include Crown Prince Frederik and Prince Joachim.

The Hirschsprung Collection's building (No. 20) is the only building situated on the park side of the street (even numbers). It was completed to a Neoclassical design by Hermann Baagøe Storck to house the personal art collection of Heinrich Hirschsprung. The museum contains an extensive collection of 19th and early 20th-century Danish art.

No. 27 was built in 1890–92 to designs by Andreas Clemmesen for the newly founded Pharmaceutical College (Danish: Den Farmaceutiske Læreanstalt). The Pharmaceutical College moved away from Stockholmsgade into a new building at University Park in 1942.

No. 59, on the corner of Dag Hammarskjölds Allé was built for Østre Borgerdyd Gymnasium. The building is from 1884 and was designed by Frederik L. Levy and Henrik Hagemann.

== Cultural references ==
The Olsen-banden commits burglary at Hjalmar Brantings Plads 4 in the opening scene of The Olsen Gang's Big Score.

Søren Ulrik Thomsen mentions the street in the poem En aften jeg går gennem Østre Anlæg (Rystet spejl).

== See also ==
- Østbanegade
