= UCPH Department of Chemistry =

Research institute in chemistry in Denmark

Coordinates: 55°41′59″N 12°33′39″E

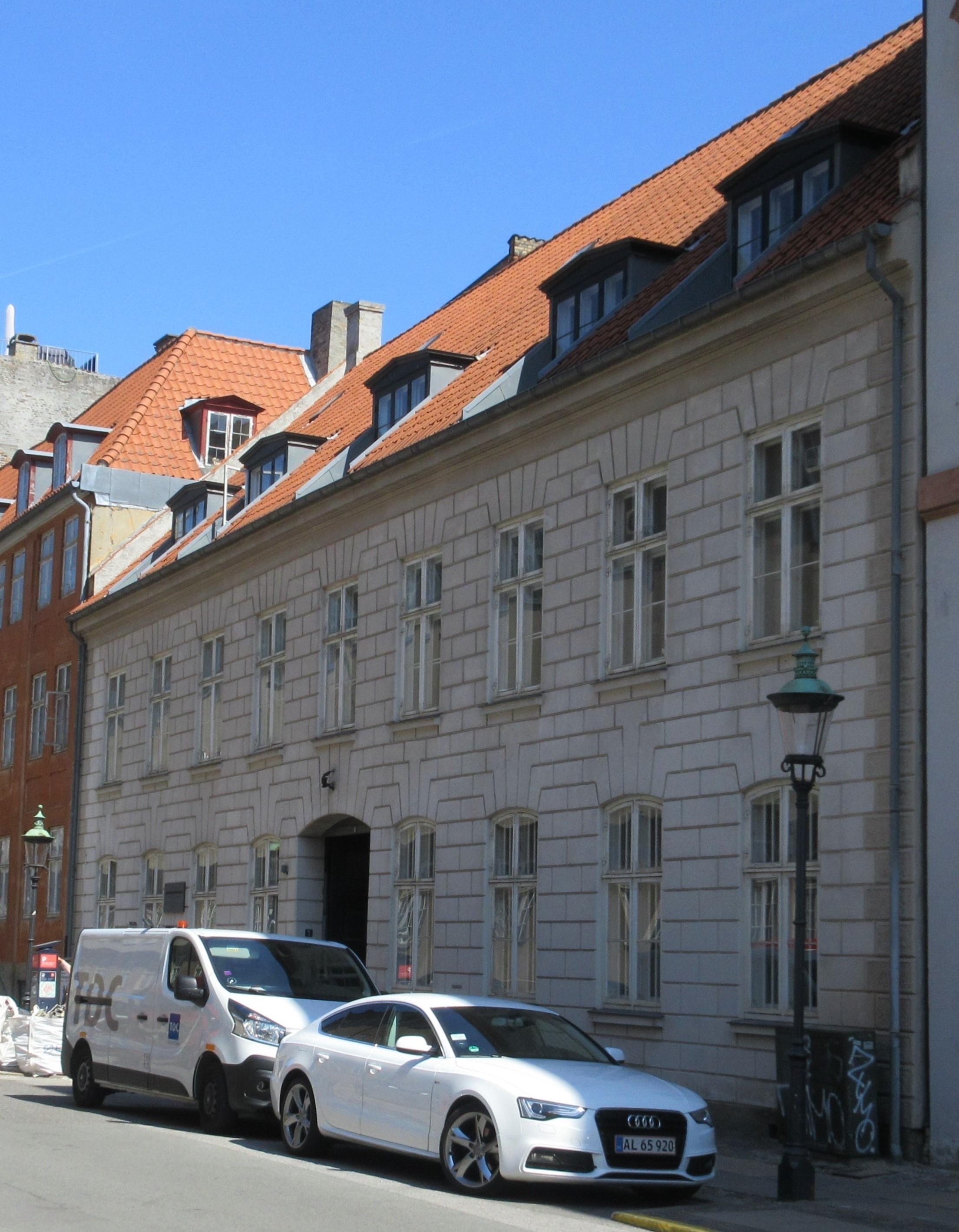
The building in Ny Vestergade (No. 11) where the Department of Chemistry was based from 1858

The Department of Chemistry (Danish: Kemisk Institut) is a department under the Faculty of Science, University of Copenhagen. It is the largest basic research institute in chemistry in Denmark, and is responsible for the teaching of chemistry at all levels at the University of Copenhagen's Faculty of Science: from undergraduate courses in chemistry to Ph.D.-level courses. Its office is located at the University of Copenhagen's North Campus.

== History ==
Research and education in chemistry has been conducted at the department since 1778, when the first Laboratorium Chymicum was established. Since then, the chemists have moved several times. In 1962, Universitetets Kemiske Laboratorium moved to its present location in the H.C. Ørsted Institute (HCØ), named after Hans Christian Ørsted who discovered electromagnetism in 1820.

A new building was erected on Jagtvej to house the Niels Bohr institute in 2024, where the Department of Chemistry also now resides.
