= UCPH Department of Biology =

Department at University of Copenhagen, a Danish university

The UCPH Department of Biology (Danish: Biologisk Institut) is a department under the Faculty of Science at University of Copenhagen (UCPH). It is organized in 10 sections and is also involved in a number of research centres. The department offer three BSc and four MSc degree programmes. With 400 employees and 1,800 students, it is the largest department at the faculty. It also operates the Øresund Aquarium in Helsingør.

== History ==
On January 1, 2004, the Botanical Institute and Zoological Institute merged into the Department of Biology, while the four museums Botanical Garden, Botanical Museum and Library, Geological Museum and Zoological Museum merged as Natural History Museum of Denmark.

== Organisation ==
=== Sections ===
- Biomolecular Sciences
- Cell Biology and Neurobiology
- Cell Biology and Physiology
- Computational and RNA Biology
- Ecology and Evolution
- Freshwater Biology
- Functional Genomics
- Marine Biology
- Microbiology
- Terrestrial Ecology

=== Research centers ===
Research centres hosted by the Department of Biology:

- Centre for Bacterial Stress Response and Persistence (BASP)
- Center for Computational and Applied Transcriptomics (COAT)
- Center for Functional and Comparative Insect Genomics
- Centre for Social Evolution (CSE)
- Danish Archaea Centre (DAC)
- Linderstrøm-Lang Centre for Protein Science

External research centres:

- Center for Chromosome Stability
- Centre for Permafrost (CENPERM)
- Centre for Lake Restoration (CLEAR)
- P´*olar Science Center

== Location ==
Most of the department is based in the University Park, part of University of Copenhagen's North Campus. Buildings used by the department include Copenhagen Biocenter (Ole Maaløes Vej 5), the August Krogh Building (Universitetsparken 13) or the adjacent buildings 1 and 3 (Universitetsparken 15) and the BIO-Aqua building (Building 20, Universitetsparken 4).

The Marine Biological Laboratory is located in Helsingør. The premises are located in association with the Øresund Aquarium. The complex is located near the city's North Harbour (Strandpromenaden 5) and was adapted to design by Rørbæk og Møller Arkitekter in 2015.

== Programmes ==
The department offers the following BSc degree programmes:

- Biology (in Danish)
- Biochemistry (in Danish)
- Molecular Biomedicine (in Danish)

MSc degrees

- Biology
- Biochemistry
- Molecular Biomedicine
- Bioinformatics
