= Medical Museion (Copenhagen) =

Museum and research unit in Copenhagen, Denmark

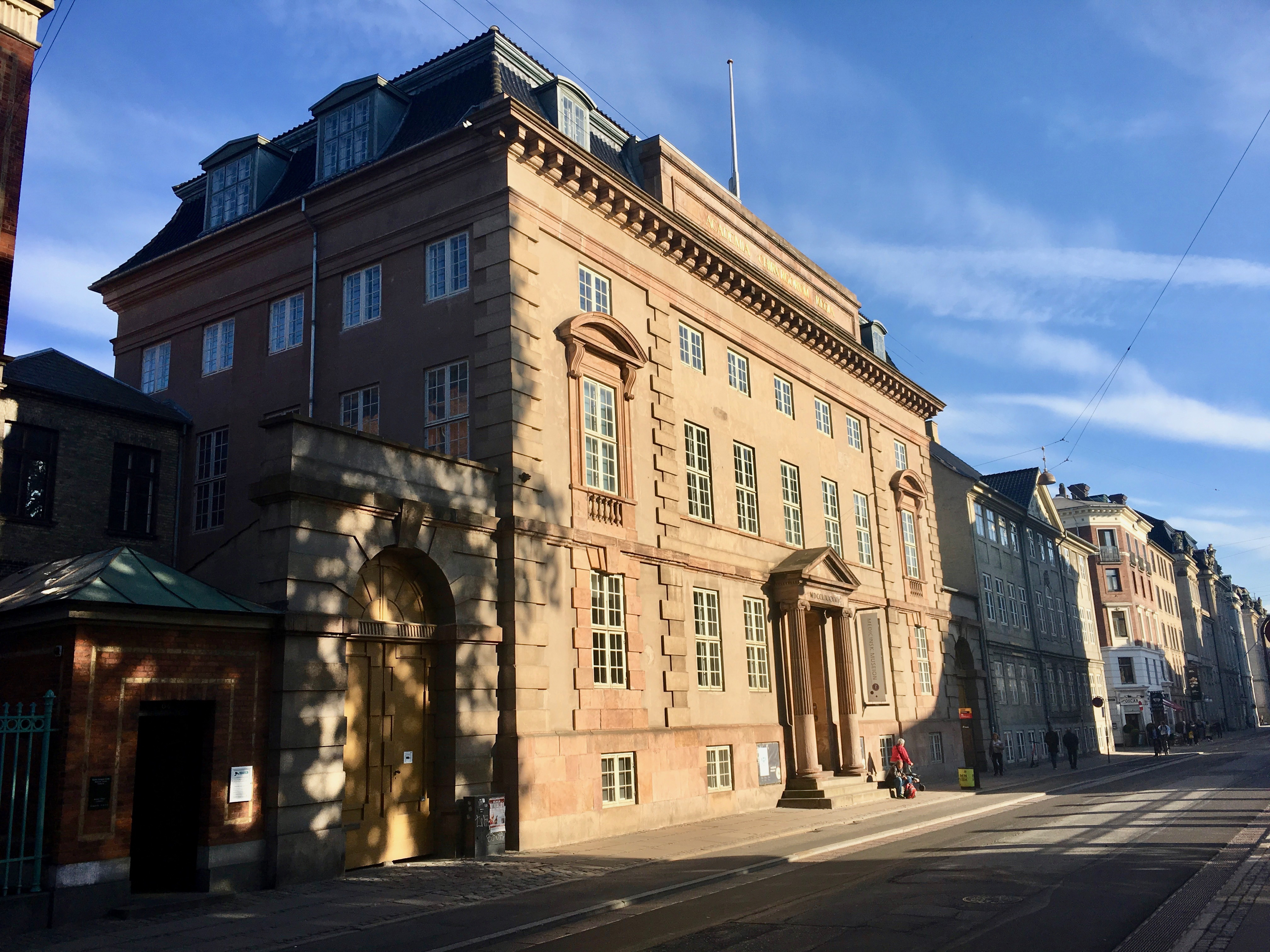
- Museum building in Copenhagen
- Established: 1907
- Location: Bredgade 62; Copenhagen, Denmark
- Coordinates: 55.6859°N 12.5919°E
- Type: Medical museum
- Director: Ken Arnold
- Website: www.museion.ku.dk

Medical Museion (Danish: Medicinsk Museion) is a museum and research unit in Copenhagen, Denmark, dedicated to the history of health and disease in a cultural perspective. Part of the Faculty of Health and Medical Sciences at University of Copenhagen, its principal area of interest is the recent history of the material and iconographic culture of biomedicine. It is based in a listed building from 1787 on Bredgade in Frederiksstaden.

== History ==
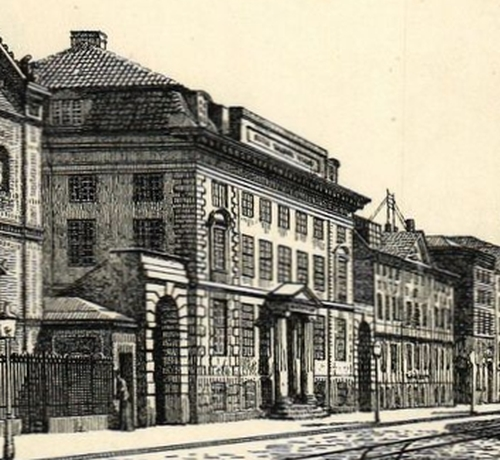
The Surgical Academy

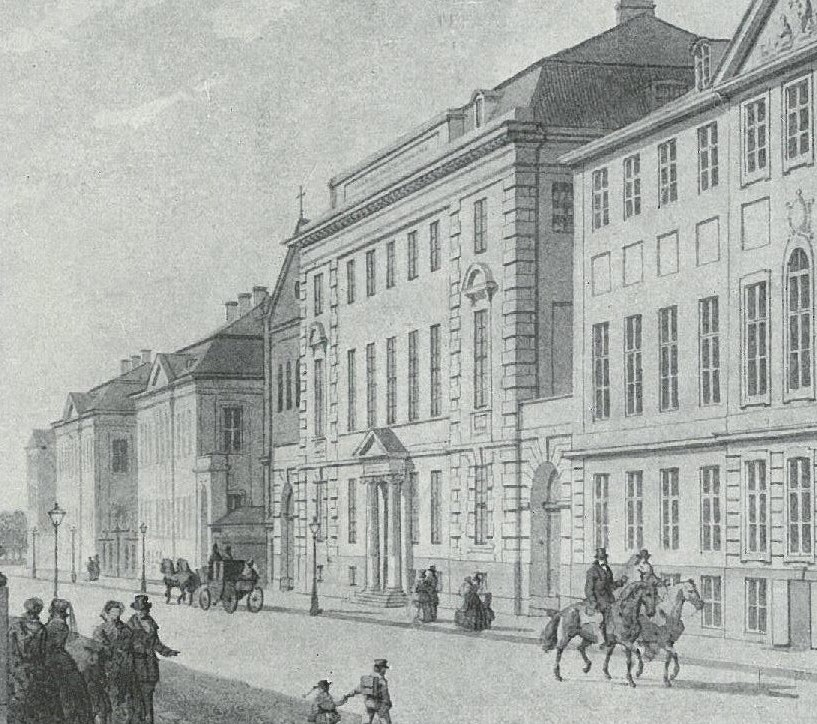
Chirurgisk Akademi

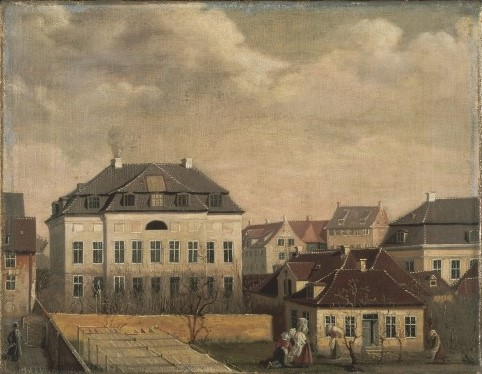
The rear side of the building seen from a window in Fødselsstiftelsen (Amaliegade 25) in c. 1840

The collections were founded by a circle of medical doctors in Copenhagen in 1906. The first exhibition of medical history opened on 22 August 1907 as part of the celebrations of the 50th anniversary of the Danish Medical Association. The museum was then located in the Rigsdag building in Fredericiagade, which now houses the High Court of Eastern Denmark, but moved to its current premises in 1947.

The museum has been part of University of Copenhagen since 1918 and was called the Museum of Medical History until 2004 when it received its current name.

== Building ==
The museum is based in a Neoclassical building from 1787 designed by Peter Meyn which used to house Academy of Surgery, an institution which was responsible for the education of surgeons in Copenhagen between 1785 and 1842. The central exhibition space is the former auditorium where dissections were carried out as part of the training.

== History of the Auditorium ==
In 1842, surgical education merged with University of Copenhagen, and the Faculty of Medicine moved into the buildings. Over the next hundred years, the auditorium was the centre of medical education in Denmark.

The teaching included lectures and exercises in dissection. The students came from all over the Kingdom of Denmark. After graduation, most spread out across the country as doctors or surgeons, while others continued their studies and became researchers - some receiving Nobel prizes.

The number of medical students increased in the first half of the 20th century, and there was no longer room to teach them all at the academy. The Faculty of Health and Medical Sciences therefore moved to new buildings in Nørrebro. The Medical-Historical Museum then took over the buildings and in 1969 the museum opened to the public.

== Architecture of the Auditorium ==
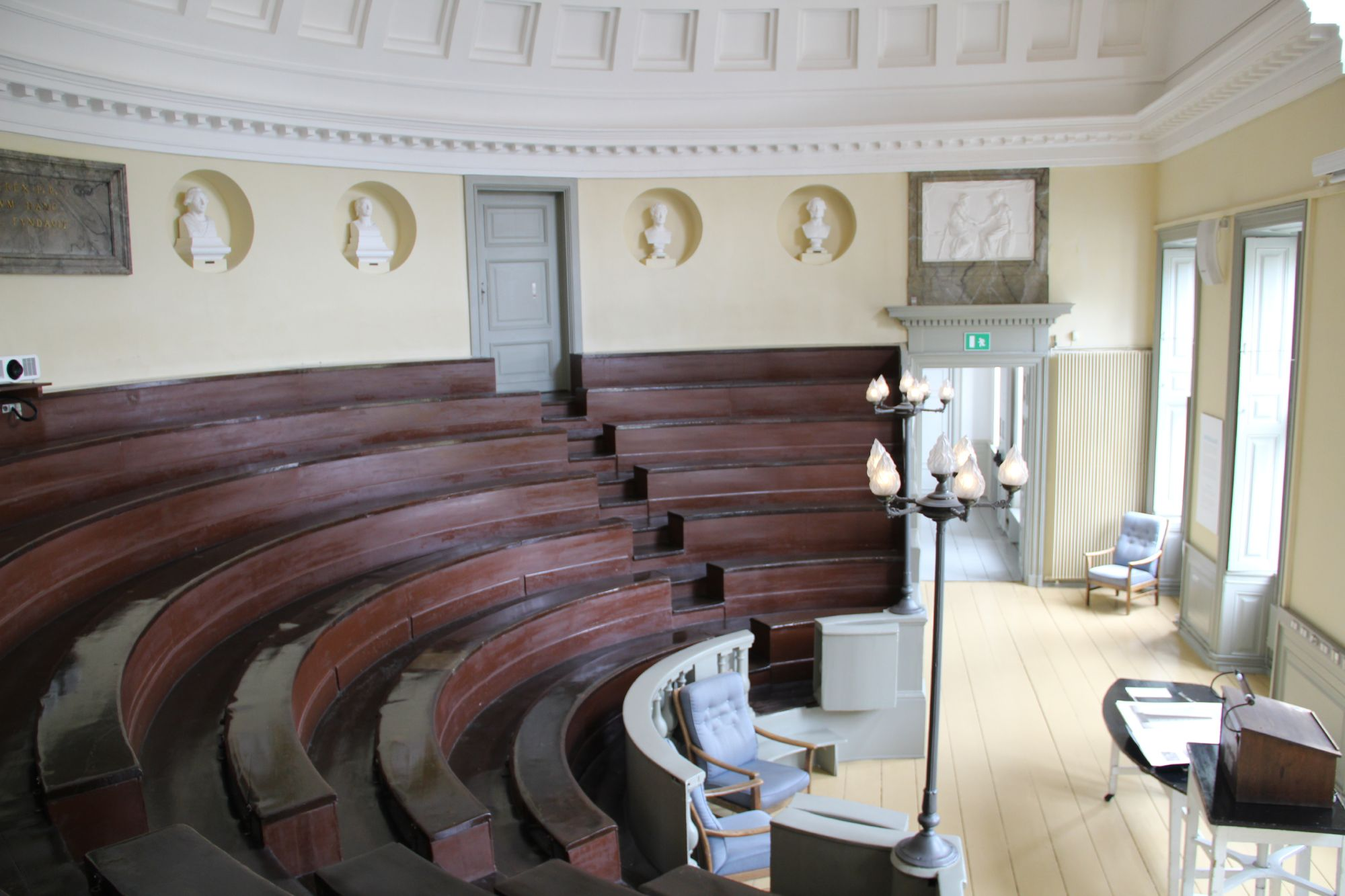
The auditorium.

The auditorium is the centre of the Royal Academy of Surgery. The architecture of the room links surgery to the long history of medical science. Architect Peter Meyn was inspired by Europe's anatomical theatres, which were used for dissection of corpses, and the domed ceiling resembles the ceiling of the Pantheon temple in Rome.

King Christian VII had great ambitions for the academy. The inscription on the back wall says that he founded the academy "out of concern for the health of the citizens for the immortal honour of the realm". On the relief above the right side entrance, the king hands over responsibility for the profession of surgery to the academy, which is depicted as a woman. The round reliefs above the windows show the Ancient Greek doctors Hippocrates and Galen. On the relief above the left side entrance, the union of medicine and science is depicted as a meeting between the Roman goddess of wisdom Minerva and the god of medicine Asclepius, who carries a staff with a snake coiled around it. The busts behind the rows of benches show famous Danish surgeons.

== Why Medical Museion ==
In 2004, the museum was renamed from the Medical-Historical Museum to Medical Museion to emphasize its role as a university museum. The name "Museion" originates from Greek and refers to a place for collections, exhibitions, research, and teaching.

== See also ==
- List of museums in and around Copenhagen
