= University of Copenhagen Faculty of Science =

Coordinates: 55°41′51″N 12°33′34″E

Faculty of Science
- Det Natur- og Biovidenskabelige Fakultet
- Latin: Facultas Naturalis
- Type: Public university
- Established: 1850; 176 years ago (as an independent faculty)
- Dean: John Renner Hansen
- Academic staff: 4,500
- Students: 9,500
- Location: Copenhagen, Denmark
- Campus: North Campus, Frederiksberg Campus
- Affiliations: EUA, LAOTSE
- Website: www.science.ku.dk/english/

The Faculty of Science (Danish: Det Natur- og Biovidenskabelige Fakultet) at the University of Copenhagen houses 12 departments, including the Natural History Museum of Denmark. The faculty also encompasses several national and international research centres, and has a number of field stations in Denmark and Greenland, among them the university's Arctic Station in central West Greenland. The faculty's administration is housed at the university's Frederiksberg Campus.

The faculty offers three-year Bachelor of Science (BS), two-year Master of Science (MS) and three-year Ph.D. degree programmes. There are two main areas of study programmes. One is the mathematical-physical-chemical subject group, which includes mathematics, computer science, actuarial science, mathematical economy, statistics, physics, astronomy, geophysics, meteorology, biophysics, chemistry, environmental chemistry, food science, biochemistry and nano-science. The other is the natural history-geography group, which includes biology, physical education, sports science, geology, geography, geo-informatics, geology-geophysics and bio-informatics. The university was co-founder of the Euroleague for Life Sciences (ELLS) which was established in 2001.

== History ==
On January 1, 2004, the Botanical Institute and Zoological Institute merged into the Department of Biology, while the four museums Botanical Garden, Botanical Museum and Library, Geological Museum and Zoological Museum merged as Natural History Museum of Denmark.

In January 2005, the August Krogh Institute and the Department of Molecular Biology merged to form the Department of Molecular Biology and Physiology. Three years later it was merged into the Department of Biology.

In January 2007, the Royal Veterinary and Agricultural University was merged into the University of Copenhagen and was renamed as the Faculty of Life Sciences. Five years later it was split up, with the veterinary part merging into the Faculty of Health and Medical Sciences and the rest merging into the Faculty of Science.

== Seal ==
The seal of the faculty contains the following text

| Sigilum Facultatis Naturalis Universitatis Hafniensis | Seal of the Faculty of Nature (i.e. Natural Science) The University of Copenhagen |

which is written in a circle around a stylized rendering of a hafnium atom. Hafnium was discovered at the Faculty in 1923 by Dirk Coster and Georg von Hevesy, and the name of the element is derived from Hafnia which is the Latin name for Copenhagen.

== Departments ==
The faculty's research and teaching takes place across 12 departments. Some departments house specialized sections and laboratories.

- Department of Biology
- Department of Chemistry
- Department of Computer Science
- Department of Food Science
- Department of Geosciences and Natural Resource Management
- Department of Mathematical Sciences
- Department of Nutrition, Exercise and Sports
- Department of Plant and Environmental Sciences
- Department of Food and Resource Economics
- Department of Science Education
- Natural History Museum of Denmark
- Niels Bohr Institute
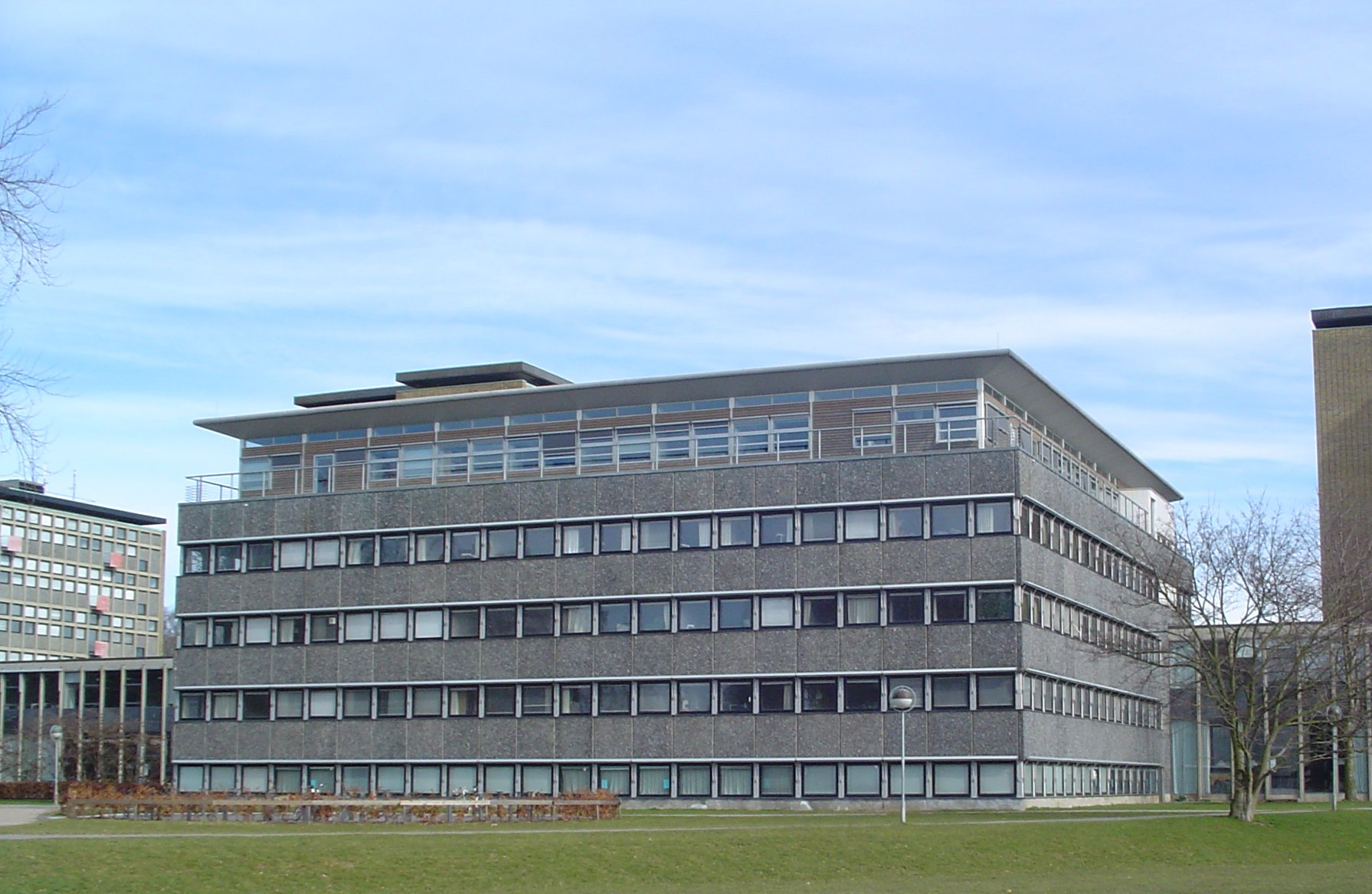
Department of Mathematical Sciences

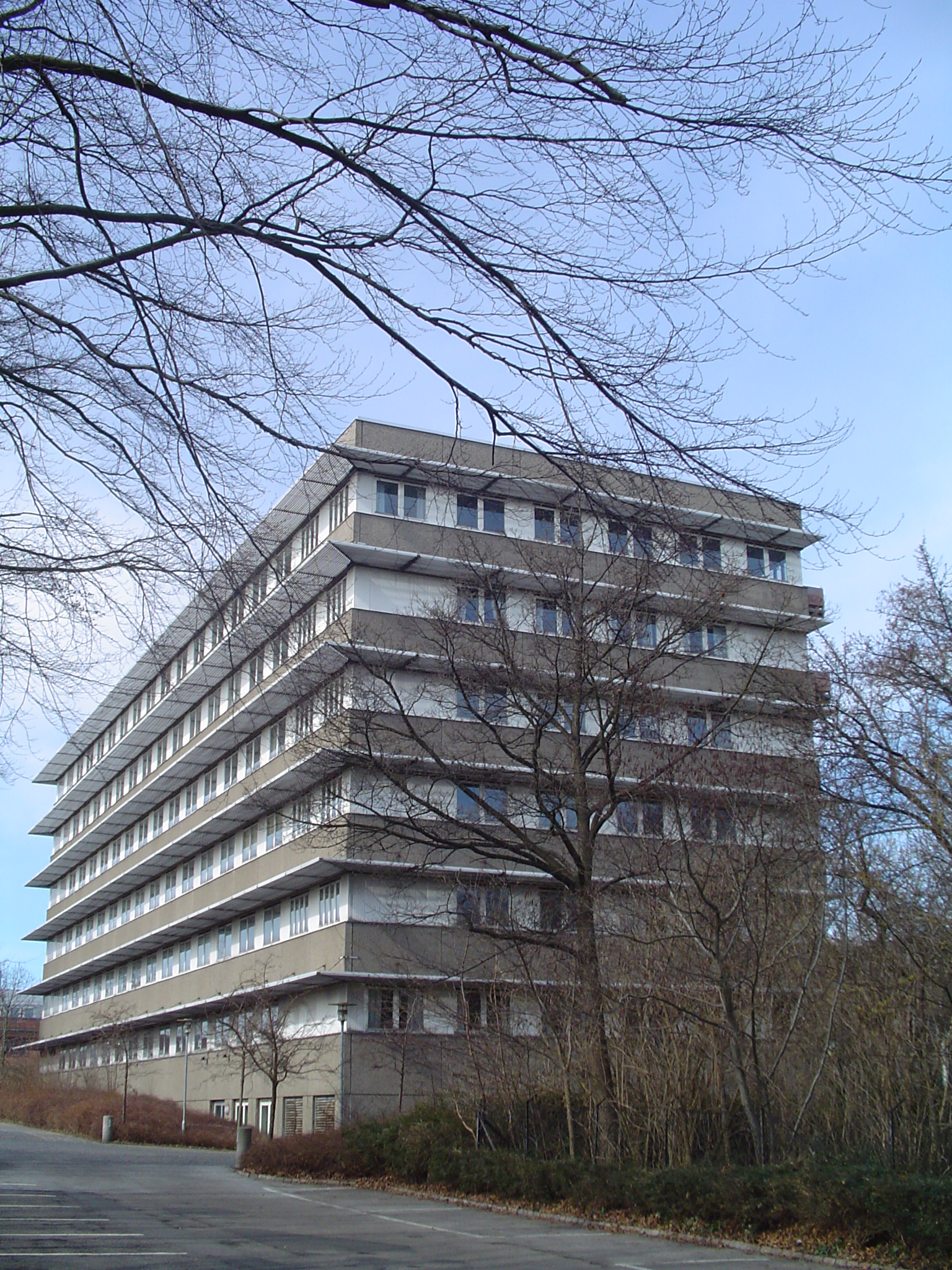
August Krogh Building

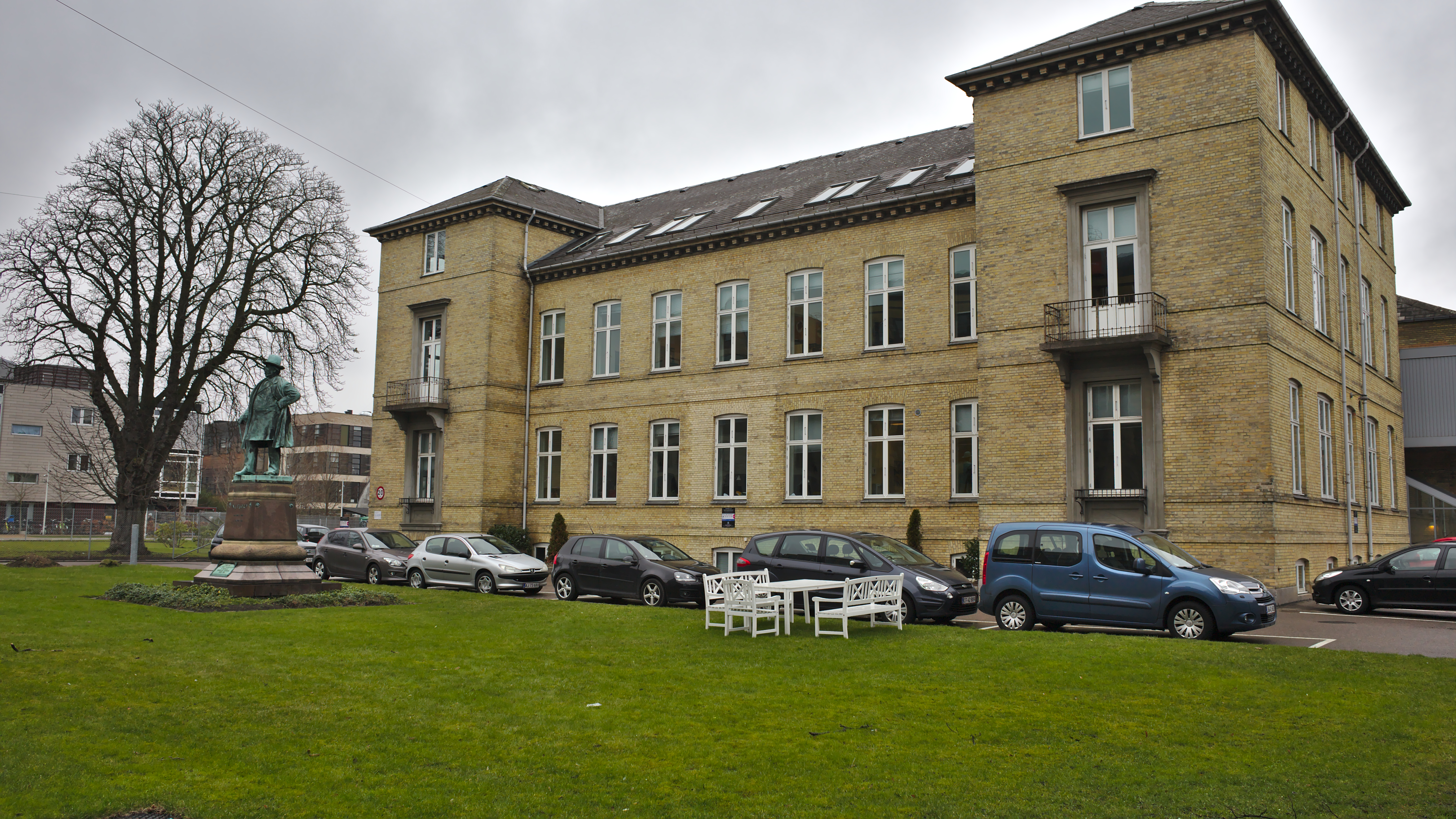
Department of Food and Resource Economics
