= University of Copenhagen Faculty of Health and Medical Sciences =

Coordinates: 55.6928°N 12.5642°E

Faculty of Health and Medical Sciences
- Det Sundhedsvidenskabelige Fakultet
- Established: 2012
- Parent institution: University of Copenhagen
- Dean: Bente Merete Stallknecht
- Academic staff: 3800
- Students: 7800
- Location: Copenhagen, Frederiksberg, and Taastrup, Denmark
- Website: healthsciences.ku.dk

The Faculty of Health and Medical Sciences (Danish: Det Sundhedsvidenskabelige Fakultet) at the University of Copenhagen houses 13 departments, 33 centres, five schools, four hospitals, and three libraries.

The Faculty educates students in the areas of Human Health and Medical Sciences, Oral Health Sciences, Pharmaceutical Sciences, and Veterinary Medicine and Animal Science.

Bente Merete Stallknecht has been the dean at the Faculty since 1 May 2022.

== History ==
The official seal of the Faculty of Health and Medical Sciences, featuring the Rod of Asclepius. It was designed by Pete Burke and first taken into use on September 1, 2004, and used until 1 January 2020. From 1 January 2020, all UCPH units use the red UCPH logo.

The Faculty of Health and Medical Sciences at the University of Copenhagen was established in its current form in 1992 from the merging of Københavns Tandlægehøjskole (The Dental School of Copenhagen) and Det Lægevidenskabelige Fakultet (The Medical Faculty).

The School of Medical Sciences' history dates back to 1479, when the University of Copenhagen was founded. The University of Oslo Faculty of Medicine was founded in 1814 as a de facto Norwegian (partial) continuation of the medical faculty in Copenhagen, as a result of the Napoleonic Wars and the breakup of Denmark-Norway by the foreign powers. The medical faculty in Oslo therefore shared many of its traditions with the Copenhagen faculty. In 1842 the Faculty of Medicine and the Kirurgisk Akademi (Academy of Surgery) were merged to form the Faculty of Medical Science.

An integration of the health education programs was discussed in the late 1970s, and a decade later, the Faculty of Medical Science and the School of Dentistry were merged to form the Faculty of Health Sciences. Buildings built during this time period include the Panum Building. As of January 2016, Panum is the Faculty of Health and Medical Sciences' largest building complex and houses six of the Faculty's thirteen departments.

In 2005, the Center for Health and Society (Danish: Center for Sundhed og Samfund, abbr. CSS) was opened in the former Copenhagen Municipal Hospital in central Copenhagen. As of January 2016, the CSS houses most of the Department of Public Health and the School of Global Health.

The School of Oral Health Sciences operates under the Department of Odontology. Its history dates back the early 1890s, when Denmark's first school of dentistry was founded on Nygade. The school moved its location twice, first in 1894 to Stormgade where the facilities were shared with the Teachers College and a school museum, and in 1928 to Trommesalen. In 1941, the school moved to newly constructed facilities on Jagtvej and changed its name to the School of Dentistry (Tandlægehøjskolen).

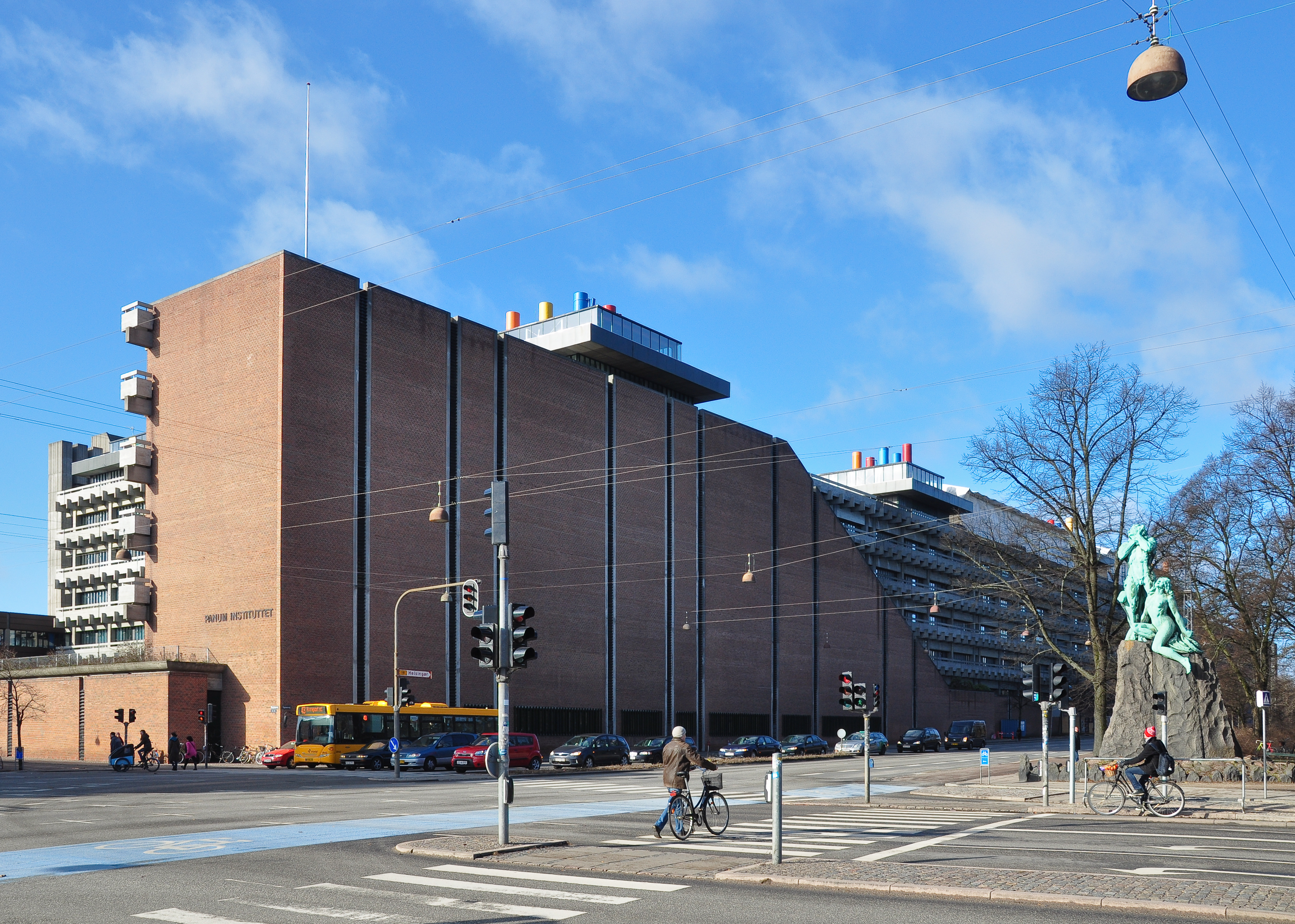
The Panum Building

During the 1980s, the School of Dentistry was merged into the University of Copenhagen and moved to the recently erected Panum Building. The former School of Dentistry was merged with the university's Faculty of Medical Science to form the Faculty of Health Sciences, and was renamed as the Central Department of Odontology (Odontologisk Centralinstitut). It consisted of two scientific and one clinical section. In the early 1990s, a revision of the dental education program resulted in 60% joint courses with the medical program. In 1993, a new university law was passed and the Department of Odontology received its current designation.

The School of Pharmaceutical Sciences' history dates back to 1892, when the Pharmaceutical College (Den Farmaceutiske Læreanstalt) was founded on Stockholmsgade. In 1942, the Pharmaceutical College moved into a new building at University Park and changed its name to the Danish Pharmaceutical College (Danmarks Farmaceutiske Højskole). In 2003, the Danish Pharmaceutical College was renamed as the Danish University of Pharmaceutical Science (Danmarks Farmaceutiske Universitet).

In 2007, the Danish University of Pharmaceutical Science was merged into the University of Copenhagen and was renamed as the Faculty of Pharmaceutical Sciences. In 2012, the Faculty of Pharmaceutical Sciences merged with the Faculty of Health Sciences and the veterinary part of the Faculty of Life Sciences to form the Faculty of Health and Medical Sciences.

In January 2007, the Royal Veterinary and Agricultural University was merged into the University of Copenhagen and was renamed as the Faculty of Life Sciences. This was later split up, with the veterinary part merging with the Faculty of Health Sciences and the Faculty of Pharmaceutical Sciences to form the Faculty of Health and Medical Sciences and the rest merging into the Faculty of Science.

The Faculty of Health and Medical Sciences received its current name when the Faculty of Health Sciences, the Faculty of Pharmaceutical Sciences, and the veterinary part of the Faculty of Life Sciences were merged in 2012.

== Departments ==
As of July 2023, the faculty houses thirteen departments. The department of Experimental Medicine and School of Oral Health Care, functions as individual departments.

- Department of Biomedical Sciences
- Department of Cellular and Molecular Medicine
- Department of Immunology and Microbiology
- Department of Neuroscience
- Department of Forensic Science
- Department of Public Health
- Department of Odontology (also referred to as the School of Dentistry)
- Department of Clinical Medicine
- Department of Pharmacy
- Department of Drug Design and Pharmacology
- Department of Veterinary Clinical Sciences
- Department of Veterinary and Animal Sciences

=== Additional Department ===
- Department of Experimental Medicine

=== School ===
- School of Oral Health Care

== Centres of excellence ==
A large amount of the research at the faculty is attached to research centres and transverse research collaboration. As of July 2023, the following list groups the current 33 centres of excellence into two groups: centres at faculty level and centres at department level.

=== Centres at Faculty Level ===
- Biotech Research and Innovation Centre (BRIC)
- The Novo Nordisk Foundation Center for Protein Research (CPR)
- The Novo Nordisk Foundation Center for Basic Metabolic Research (CBMR)
- The Novo Nordisk Foundation Center for Stem Cell Biology (reNEW)
- Center for Translational Neuromedicine (CTN)

=== Centres at Department Level ===
- Center for Biopharmaceuticals and Biobarriers in Drug Delivery
- Center for Chromosome Stability (CCS)
- Center for Evolutionary Hologenomics
- Center for Gene Expression (CGEN)
- Center for Glacial Rock Flour Research
- The Center for Healthy Aging (CEHA)
- Center for Macroecology, Evolution and Climate (CMEC)
- Center for Translational Medicine & Parasitology (CMP)
- Center for Medicinal Chemistry (MedChem)
- Center for non-coding RNA in Technology and Health (RTH)
- Center for Peptide-Based Antibiotics (CEPAN)
- Center for Research in Cattle Production and Health (CPH Cattle)
- Center for Research in Pig Production and Health (CPH Pig)
- Center for Star and Planet Formation (STARPLAN)
- The Centre for Health Economics and Policy (CHEP)
- Copenhagen Center for Disaster Research (COPE)
- Copenhagen Center for Glycomics (CCG)
- Copenhagen Centre for Regulatory Science (CORS)
- Copenhagen Hepatitis C Program (CO-HEP)
- Copenhagen Studies on Asthma in Childhood (COPSAC)
- Coserton Biofilm Center (CBC)
- Danish Research Centre for Migration Ethnicity and Health (MESU)
- LEO Foundation Center for Cutaneous Drug Delivery
- LEO Foundation Skin Immunology Research Center (SIC)
- Lundbeck Foundation GeoGenetics Centre
- Lundbeck Foundation Research Initiative on Brain Barriers and Drug Delivery (RIBBDD)
- NEOMUNE Centre (NEOMUNE)
- Novo Nordisk - LIFE in Vivo Pharmacology Centre (LIFEPHARM)
