= Peter Ludvig Panum =

Danish physiologist and pathologist

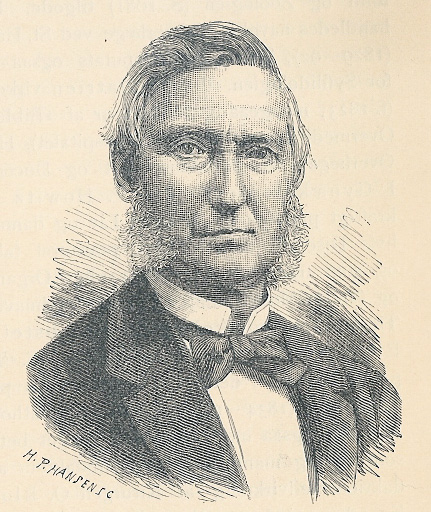
Peter Ludvig Panum

Peter Ludvig Panum (19 December 1820 – 2 May 1885) was a Danish physiologist and pathologist born on the island of Bornholm in Rønne. He founded studies in exercise physiology at the University of Copenhagen. The Panum Institute in Copenhagen is named in his honor.

== Early life and education ==
Panum was born in Rønne on the island of Bornholm, the son of regiment surgeon Jens Severin Nathanael Panum (1792-1836) and Johanne Caroline Louise Charlotte Lande (1798-1844). The family moved to Eckernförde (Rendsburg) in 1829, where his father had assumed a position as regiment surgeon. After matriculating from Flensburg Learned School in 1840, Panum enrolled first at Kiel University before in 1841 transferring to the University of Copenhagen.

== Career ==
After completing his medical studies in 1845, Panum assumed a position at Almindelig Hospital in Copenhagen. During 1846 he was chosen by the government to undertake research of a measles epidemic in the Faroe Islands. As a result of his investigations which included examinations of the cultural practices, he published a classic treatise titled "Observations Made During the Epidemic of Measles on the Faroe Islands in the Year 1846". Later he studied with Rudolf Virchow at the University of Würzburg (1851), and with Claude Bernard in Paris (1852–53).

From 1855 Panum was a professor at the University of Kiel, where he established a laboratory for physiology. In 1856, he published his research into what is now known as an endotoxin. This is now acknowledged as the first systematic and scientific studies of endotoxins, a substance once referred to as "putrid poison" that was thought to be responsible for symptoms and signs observed in individuals with sepsis. In 1858, Panum published his research into binocular vision, in particular into how far from the eyes an object could appear as a single object when looking at another object at a different distance from the eyes. He was able to keep away anti-vivisectionists from his blood transfusion experiments on dogs. He was able to successfully transfuse blood after defibrination. He was chosen to preside on the Eighth International Medical Congress in Copenhagen in 1884 helping work between Scandinavian and other european researchers.

Troubled by anti-Danish sentiment at Kiel, Panum relocated to the University of Copenhagen during 1862, where he spent the remainder of his career. Among his students at Copenhagen were physiologist Christian Bohr (1855-1911) and zymologist Emil Christian Hansen (1842-1909). He helped organize studies in exercise physiology in Copenhagen.

He was President of the 8th International Medical Congress which was held in Copenhagen.

== Personal life ==
Panum was married to Hortense Susanne Hagen (1826-1899) on 5 September 1853, daughter of merchant and farmer Peter Munck Hagen (1796-1865) and Charlotte Frederikke Søbøtker (1801-70). He was the father of Hortense Panum and Peter Panum.

Panum died on 2 May 1885 and is buried in the local Garrison Cemetery.

== Accolades ==
Panum was created a Knight in the Order of the Dannebrog in 1850 and was created a 2nd-class Commander in 1883. He was awarded the Cross of Honour in 1878.

From his studies of binocular vision, Panum's name came to be used for the area of the visual field in which an object appeared to be single rather than double. It is called Panum's area or Panum's fusional area

The Panum Building is named after him.

== Publications ==
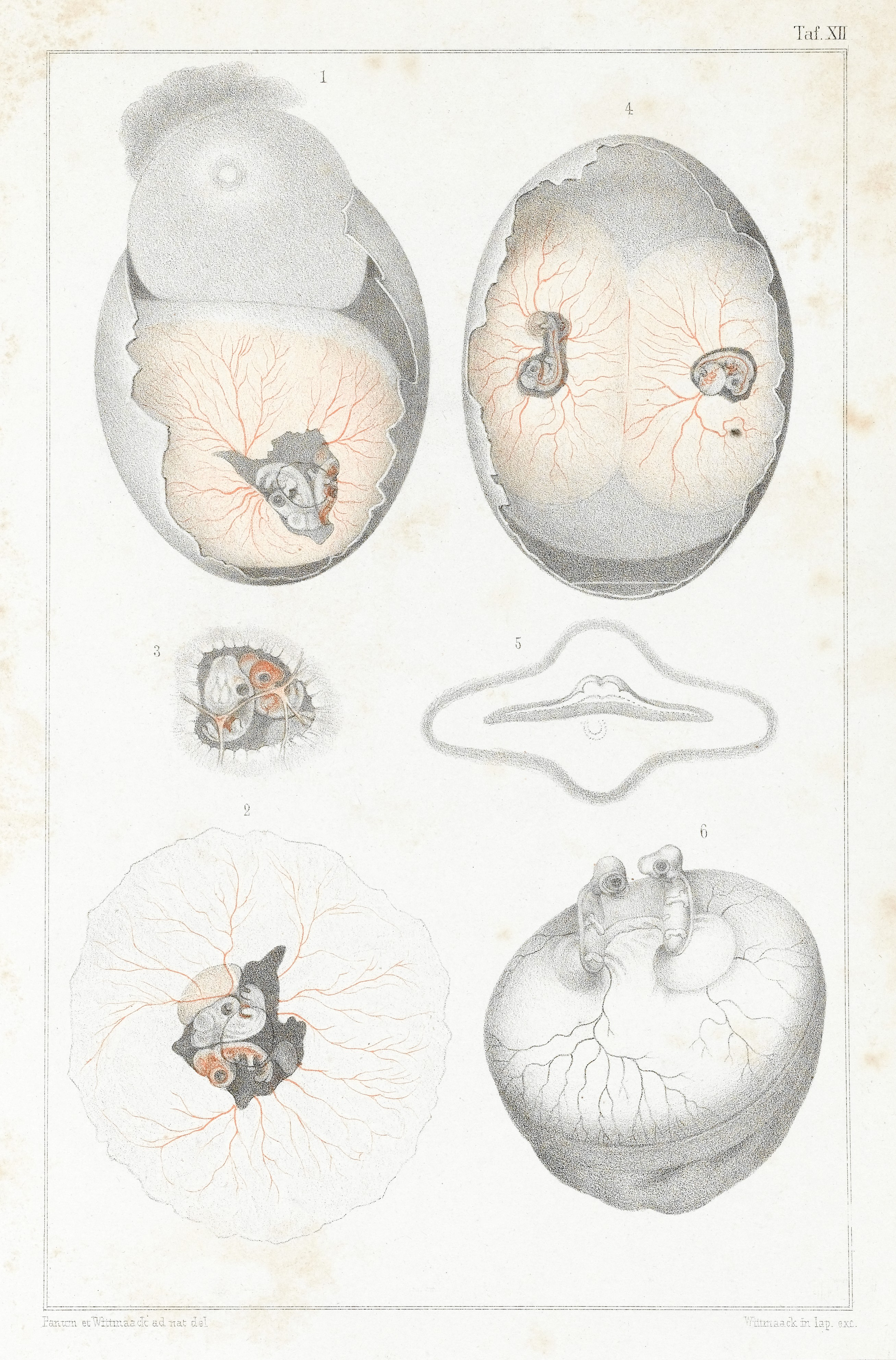
Bird embryo drawn by Panum

- Experimentelle Untersuchungen zur Physiologie und Pathologie der Embolie, Transfusion und Blutmenge, 1864 - Experimental studies on the physiology and pathology of embolism, transfusion and blood volume.
  - Works by Panum that have been translated into English:
- Observations Made During the Epidemic of Measles on the Faroe Islands in the Year 1846.
- XI: Observations on the Measles Contagion.
- Physiological Investigations Concerning Vision with Two Eyes.
  - Publications about Panum:
- Bibliographical biography of Peter Ludvig Panum (1820-1885), epidemiologist and physiologist by W M Gafafer.
