= Nordic Institute of Asian Studies =

Danish research institute

Coordinates: 55.6872°N 12.5713°E

- Nordisk Institut for Asien Studier
- Type: University institute
- Active: 1968–2023
- Affiliations: Nordic Centre in Shanghai
- Chairman: Nina Græger
- Director: Duncan McCargo
- Faculty: University of Copenhagen Faculty of Social Sciences
- Location: Copenhagen, Denmark
- Campus: City Campus
- Website: NIAS

Nordic Institute of Asian Studies (Danish: Nordisk Institut for Asien Studier), or NIAS for short, was a research institute and resource center dedicated to Asian studies, affiliated with the University of Copenhagen in Denmark. It ceased operations and was officially closed on 31 December 2023.

The institute was located in Copenhagen and served all five Nordic countries, comprising Denmark (including Greenland and Faroe Islands), Norway, Sweden, Finland and Iceland. NIAS was established under the auspices of the Nordic Council of Ministers in 1968 as a Nordic focal point for research on Asia.

== Structure and purpose ==
On 1 January 2005, NIAS was incorporated as an independent academic institute under Danish University Law, and was a centre at the Department of Political Science of the University of Copenhagen. The Department of Political Science had administrative and legal responsibility for NIAS, while the institute's independence was manifested through NIAS own strategy and research policy.

NIAS maintained a strong focus on modern and contemporary Asia, with special emphasis on politics, economics, anthropology, and development studies.

== Library ==
Nordic Institute of Asian Studies held its own library, NIAS Library and Information Centre (NIAS LINC), serving the NIAS community. NIAS LINC had been a digital library since 2014.

== Publication ==
Nordic Institute of Asian Studies operated its own press, NIAS Press, focusing primarily on social sciences and history relating to contemporary Southeast Asia and East Asia, but not exclusively. NIAS Press presented authors from all over the world and published exclusively in English. Although NIAS has closed, NIAS Press publications remain available worldwide through a partnership with NUS Press.

Asia in Focus was a peer-reviewed academic journal published twice a year on-line by NIAS.

== See also ==
- Nordic Centre in Shanghai
