= ARDD =

ARDD may refer to:

- Aging Research and Drug Discovery, non-profit conference
- Agriculture and Rural Development Day, annual event
- Arab Renaissance for Democracy and Development, non-profit organization
- Ardd, a character in Four Knights of the Apocalypse
- ardd, an element of Welsh placenames
