= August Ferdinand Mehren =

Danish orientalist

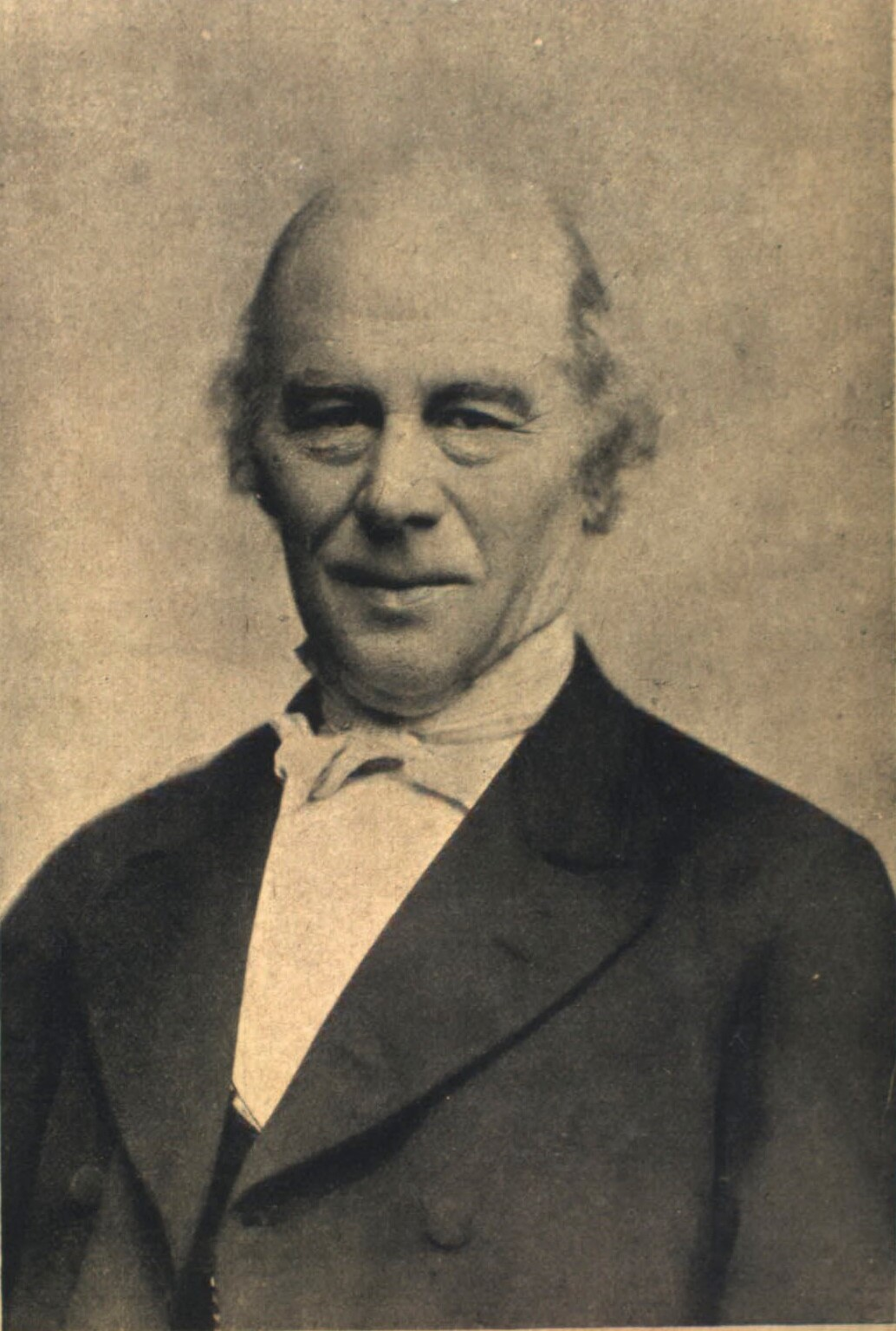
- Born: 6 April 1822; Helsingør, Denmark
- Died: 14 November 1907 (aged 85); Fredensborg, Denmark
- Education: University of Copenhagen
- Scientific career
- Fields: Orientalist and philologist
- Workplaces: University of Copenhagen

August Ferdinand Michael van Mehren (6 April 1822 – 14 November 1907 ) was a Danish Orientalist and philologist.

== Early life and education ==
Mehren was born in Helsingør, the son of merchant Johann Friedrich van Mehren (1789-1853) and Claudine Amalie Liebmann (1791-1852). He studied at the Universities of Copenhagen, Leipzig and Kiel, obtaining his doctorate in 1845. In Leipzig he was a student of Heinrich Leberecht Fleischer (1801-1888), and in Kiel he studied under Justus Olshausen (1800-1882).

== Career ==
In 1854, he became a professor of Semitic languages at the University of Copenhagen. In 1854 he became professor of Semitic-Eastern philology, from which position he retired in 1898.

In his academic work, Mehren largely focused on Arabic poetry and prose. In 1853, he published a major work on Arab rhetoric and linguistics titled Die Rhetorik der Araber, and two decades later (1874), translated into French the cosmography of the Syrian geographer Muhammed al-Dimashqi (1256-1327) in Manuel de la cosmographie du moyen âge. He also published Cosmographie de Schem's Eddin Dimasqui (1866; With French translation in 1874),

During the winter of 1867-68 he resided in Egypt where he predominantly cultivated the Arabic language. With professor Justus Olshausen and philologist Niels Ludvig Westergaard (1815-1878), he was responsible for cataloging Avestan manuscripts into a collection called Codices Orientales Bibliothecae Regiae Havniensis. Towards the end of his career, Mehren published a handful of books involving the philosophical and mystical writings of Avicenna.

He became a Knight of the Order of the Dannebrog in 1869, Dannebrogsmand in 1887, Commander of the 2nd degree in 1892 and of the 1st degree in 1898. He spent his last years in Fredensborg, where he died in 1907. He was buried in Elsinore.

== Personal life ==
On 7 July 1849, Mehren was married to Johanne (Jenny) Sophie Charlotte Justine Daue (30 June 1816 -10 February 1866), daughter of major Severin Daue (1776-1852) and Anna (Marie) Larsen (1786-1864), in Trinitatis Church in Copenhagen.

Andreas Hunæus has painted a portrait of him. His is also one of the fifty scientists depicted in Peder Severin Krøyer's monumental 1897 group portrait painting A Meeting in the Royal Danish Academy of Sciences and Letters.

He spent his last years in Fredensborg following his retirement in 1898 and is buried in Helsingør Cemetery.

== Accolades ==
He was created a Knight in the Order of the Dannebrog in 1869, a Commander of the Second Class in 1892 and a Commander of the First Class in 1898. He was awarded the Cross of Honour in 1887.

== Other sources ==
- The Arabic studies in the Nordic countries, from 1850 to 1900 (translated from Danish)
- Project Runeberg (biographical information)
