= Nordic Centre in Shanghai =

Coordinates: 31°17′48″N 121°30′04″E

- 复旦大学北欧中心
- Established: 1995
- Location: Shanghai, China
- Website: nordiccentre.org

The Nordic Centre in Shanghai at Fudan University (复旦大学北欧中心) was officially opened on November 8, 1995 by the Norwegian Prime Minister Gro Harlem Brundtland and Professor Yang Fujia, President of Fudan University. The Nordic Centre was then a joint project between Fudan University and 14 Nordic universities. Today the Centre has 26 member universities representing the five Nordic countries and one associate member.

The Nordic Centre is the only joint Nordic academic institution set up in China.

== Member Universities ==
=== China ===
- Fudan University

=== Denmark ===
- Aalborg University
- Copenhagen Business School
- University of Aarhus
- University of Copenhagen
- University of Southern Denmark

=== Finland ===
- Aalto University
- Hanken School of Economics
- Lappeenranta University of Technology
- University of Eastern Finland
- University of Helsinki
- University of Tampere
- University of Turku

=== Iceland ===
- University of Iceland

=== Norway ===
- Norwegian School of Economics and Business Administration
- BI Norwegian Business School
- Norwegian University of Science and Technology
- University of Bergen
- University of Oslo
- UiT The Arctic University of Norway

=== Sweden ===
- University of Gothenburg
- Karolinska Institutet
- Lund University
- Royal Institute of Technology
- Stockholm University
- Umeå University
- Uppsala University
- Linköping University

=== Associate Member ===
- Nordic Institute of Asian Studies (closed permanently in 2023)
