= Peter Kristian Prytz =

Danish physicist

Peter Kristian Prytz (26 February 1851 - 4 March 1929) was a Danish physicist. He was a professor at the Technical University of Denmark from 1894 to 1921.

== Early life and education ==
Prytz was born on 26 February 1851 in Årup at Torslev, the son of parish priest Peter Christian Prytz (1807–77) and Anna Eline Garben (1814-1906). He earned a degree in physics from the University of Copenhagen in 1875 and spent the next ten years teaching at schools in Copenhagen.

== Career ==
In 1883, he volunteered as an assistant at a new course in experimental physics for engineers arranged by C. Christiansen. He became a teacher at the College of Advanced Technology in 1886 and was appointed professor in 1894. He was throughout his career also responsible for teaching experimental physics to physics students at the University of Copenhagen. He was also teaching physics at the Danish Military Academy (1887–90) and at the medicine and pharmacist programmes of the University of Copenhagen (1886–97).

The College of Advanced Technology was initially located in Studiestræde. In 1890, it relocated to the new Sølvtorv Complex. In 1906-07, the facilities were once again improved when the new Farimagsgade Wing was inaugurated. In 1907-12, funding of DKK enabled Prytz to create the new Physical Laboratory. In 1921, it was replaced by the new Niels Bohr Institute.

He was a member of the Royal Danish Academy of Sciences and Letters from 1891 and also of a number of foreign scientific academies.aber. He represented Denmark in the International Committee for Weights and Measures.

== Personal life ==
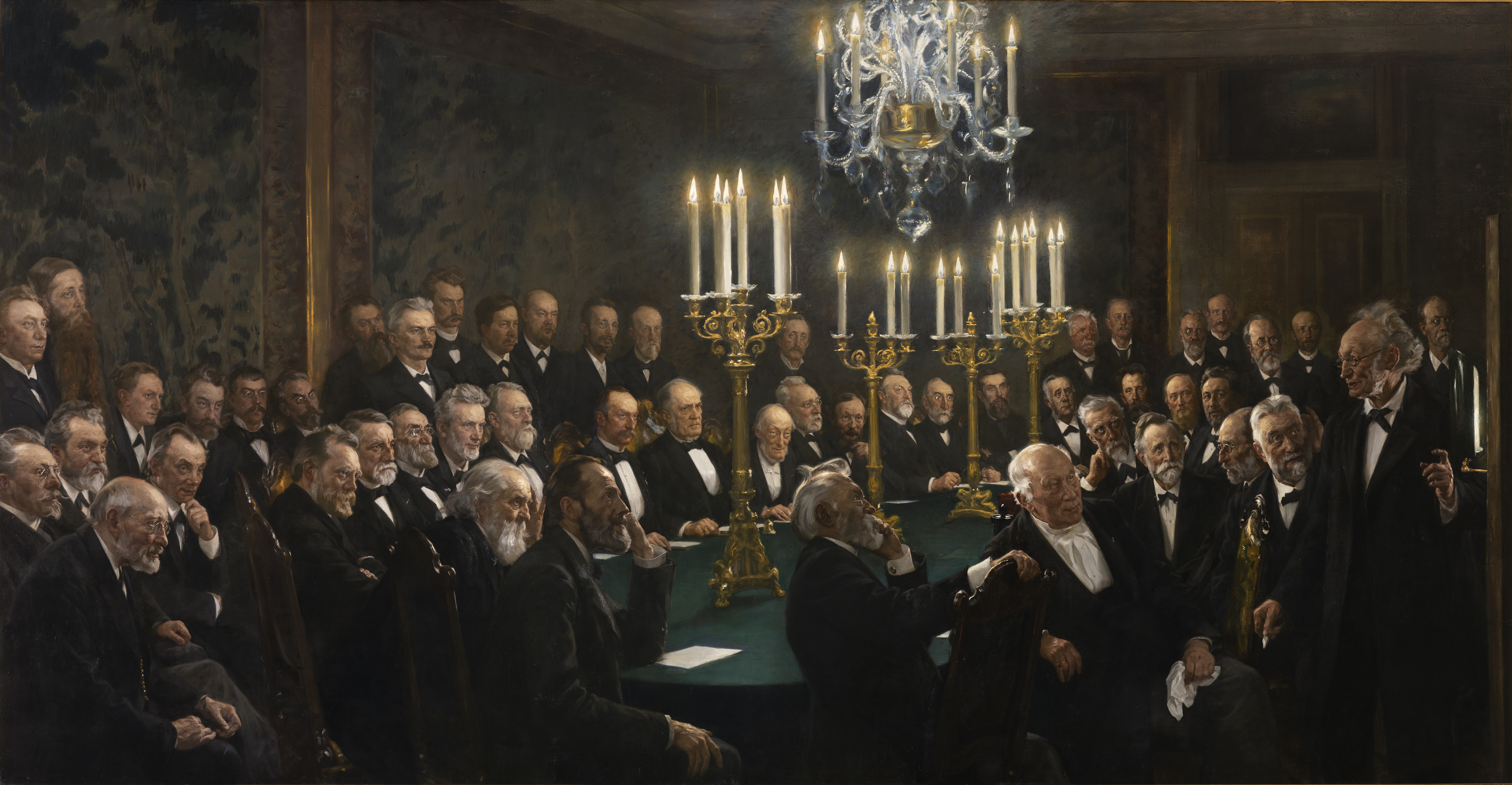
P. S. Krøyer A Meeting in the Royal Danish Academy of Sciences and Letters

On 30 May 1879, Prytz married Anna Cathrine Steenstrup (6 February 1852 - 22 August 1935) She was a daughter of the theologian Mathias Steenstrup (1822-1904) and Rise J. J. Kjellerup (1827-1906).

Prytz is one of the scientists depicted in Peder Severin Krøyer's monumental 1897 group portrait painting A Meeting in the Royal Danish Academy of Sciences and Letters. He was created a Knight in the Order of the Dannebrog in 1900 and a Commander of the Second Class in 1920. He was awarded the Cross of Honour in 1915.

He died on 4 March 1929 in Hellerup and is buried in Solbjerg Park Cemetery in Frederiksberg.

== Selected publications ==
- Naturlæren. En kortfattet Vejledning, 1885 (6. udg. 1906)
- Hovedtrækkene af de vigtigste fysiske Maalemetoder, 1901 (2. udg. 1914)
- Læren om faste Legemers Bevægelse I-II, 1918–20
- Høje og lave Varmegrader, 1925
