= Johan Ludvig Heiberg =

Johan Ludvig Heiberg may refer to:

- Johan Ludvig Heiberg (poet) (1791–1860), Danish poet and dramatist, husband of Johanne Luise Heiberg
- Johan Ludvig Heiberg (philologist) (1854–1928), Danish philologist and historian of mathematics
