= Anna Hude =

Denmark's first female history graduate

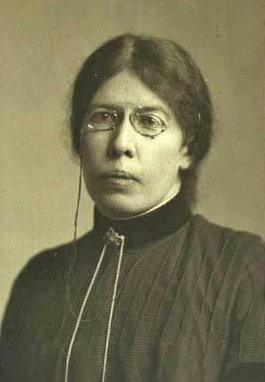
- Born: 26 July 1858; Ebeltoft, Denmark
- Died: 9 August 1934 (aged 76); Copenhagen, Denmark
- Movement: women's suffrage

Academic background
- Education: Copenhagen University
- Thesis: Danehoffet og dets Plads i Danmarks Statsforfatning

Academic work
- Discipline: history
- Institutions: Danish National Archives

Anna Sophie (von der) Hude (1858–1934) was the first Danish woman to graduate as a historian (1887), the first to be awarded Copenhagen University's gold medal (1888) and the first to become a Doctor of Philosophy. She is also remembered for becoming an active campaigner for women's suffrage in the early 20th century.

== Early life and education ==
Born on 26 July 1858 in Ebeltoft, Anna Sophie von der Hude was the daughter of Sophus Waldemar von der Hude and Johanne Larentine Elisabeth Tulinius. She was raised together with her four siblings in Roskilde. After working for a time as a schoolteacher, she moved to Copenhagen in 1878 to complete her secondary schooling. After earning her matriculation certificate in 1882, she studied at Copenhagen University. In 1887, she became the first woman to graduate in history. The following year, she was awarded the university's gold medal for her dissertation on the origins of feudalism, En Fremstilling og Kritik af de nyere Opfattelser af Spørgsmaalet om Lensvæsnets Opkomst. In 1893, she became the first woman to receive a Dr.phil for her work on the Danehof medieval parliament titled Danehoffet og dets Plads i Danmarks Statsforfatning.

== Rape incident ==
While Hude was studying, in 1879 she became acquainted with C.J. Leerbeck, the family doctor of her uncle with whom she was staying. A few months later, Leerbeck raped her. After first attempting suicide, she shot him on an open street. He survived but later hanged himself in the cell where he was being held after Hude explained the reason for her action. The case was widely publicized, leading to Hude's release after only five months in prison.

== Career and later life ==
Hude was the first woman to be employed by the Danish National Archives where she worked from 1889 to 1910. While there, she collaborated with Kristian Erslev and William Christensen on Repertorium diplomaticum Regni danici mediævalis.

From 1884, Hede became increasingly active in the cause for women's rights, becoming a member of the Danish Women's Society. In 1904, she became active in campaigning for women's suffrage, cofounding the Political Women's Association (Politisk Kvindeforening) which she headed as the first president in 1905. The association was the basis for Landsforbundet for Kvinders Valgret, founded in 1907.

From 1908, she lost interest in women's rights, preferring to devote her time to spiritism. In 1913, she published The Evidence for Communication with the Dead in English, since reprinted.

Anna Hude died in Copenhagen on 9 August 1934.

== Selected publications ==
- The Evidence for Communication with the Dead. London: Adelphi Terrace. 1913.

== See also ==
- Ingeborg Hammer-Jensen, the third woman to be awarded a PhD in Denmark.
