= Copenhagen Municipal Hospital =

- Københavns Kommunehospital
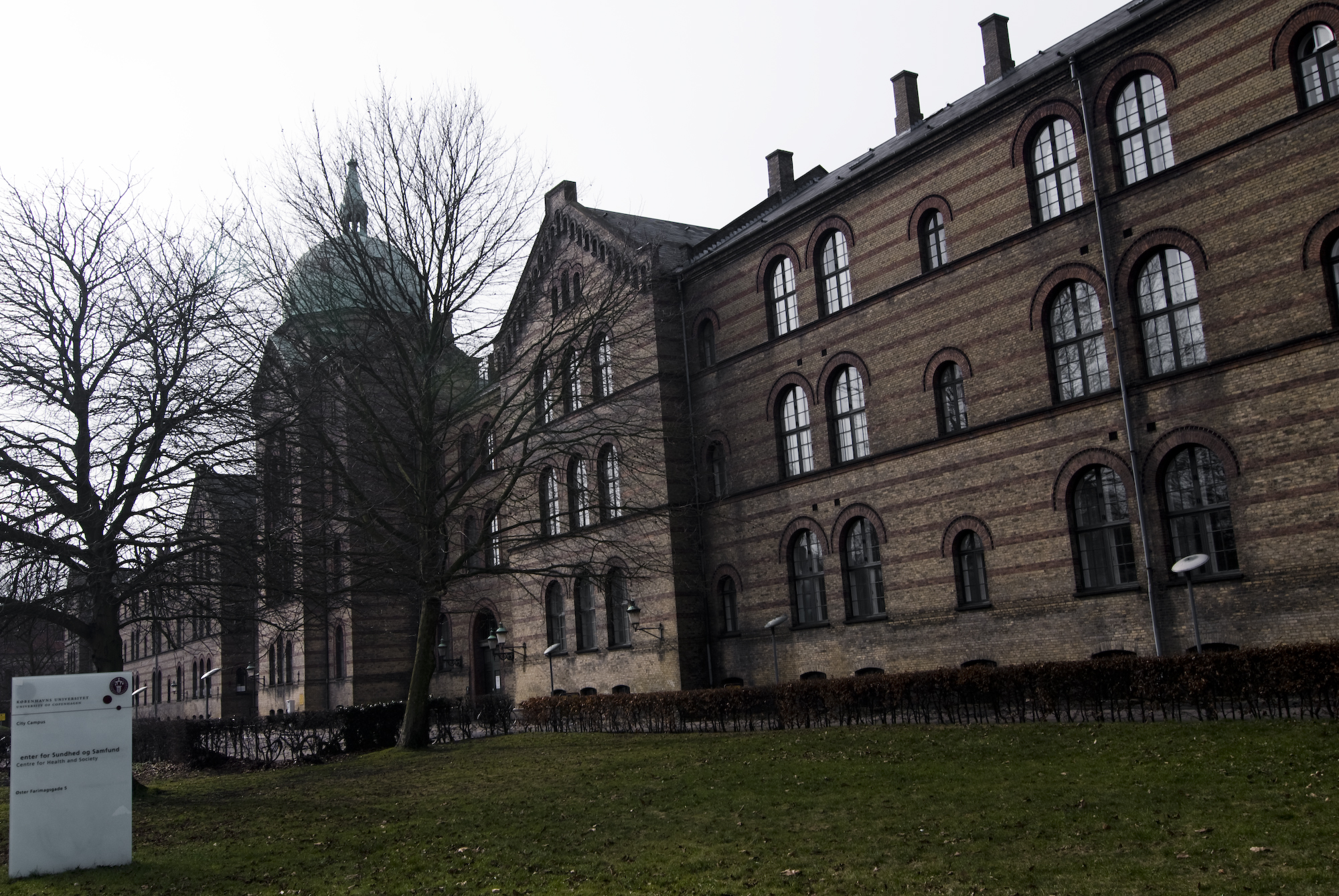
- Main entrance
- Interactive map of the Copenhagen Municipal Hospital area

General information
- Architectural style: Neo-Byzantine
- Location: Copenhagen, Denmark, Denmark
- Coordinates: 55°41′4.4″N 12°34′14.82″E
- Construction started: 1859
- Completed: 1863
- Client: Copenhagen Municipality

Design and construction
- Architect: Christian Hansen

Copenhagen Municipal Hospital (Danish: Københavns Kommunehospital) was a hospital that existed from 1863 until 1999 in Copenhagen, Denmark. Its buildings, located on Øster Farimagsgade, opposite Copenhagen Botanical Garden, now form part of the University of Copenhagen's City Campus.

== History ==
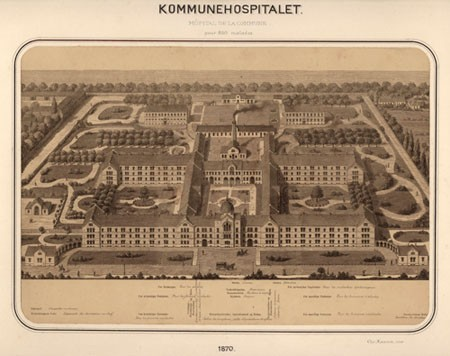
Copenhagen Municipal Hospital

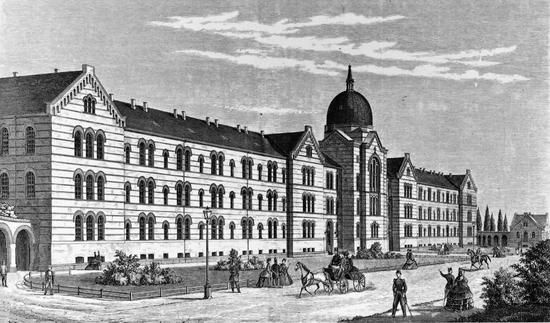
The building shortly after its completion in 1863

The 1853 Copenhagen cholera outbreak highlighted the need for improvements in the city's healthcare system. It was therefore decided to build a new hospital and a site was selected on the glacis outside the North Rampart of the city's Fortification Ring which was now finally decommissioned. Royal Building Inspector Christian Hansen, who had recently returned to Denmark from Greece was charged with the design of the building. Construction began in 1859 and the hospital was inaugurated on 19 September 1863.

The hospital was operated by Copenhagen Municipality. Very modern for its time, it contained 844 beds and pioneered a number of treatments, techniques and diagnoses in Denmark. The hospital became a university hospital in 1873 and introduced the first professional training of nurses in Denmark in 1876.

Copenhagen Municipal Hospital also pioneered the first intensive care unit globally in 1953, set up by anaesthetist Bjørn Aage Ibsen.

The buildings were sold to the property company Norden in 2003. The hospital closed on 1 May 2009.

== Building ==
Christian Hansen's original hospital building consisted of two three-story main wings joined together by two connectors. In 1954, the complex was expanded by city architect Frederik Christian Lund in a style similar to that of the original buildings.
