= A Meeting in the Royal Danish Academy of Sciences and Letters =

1897 painting by Peder Severin Krøyer

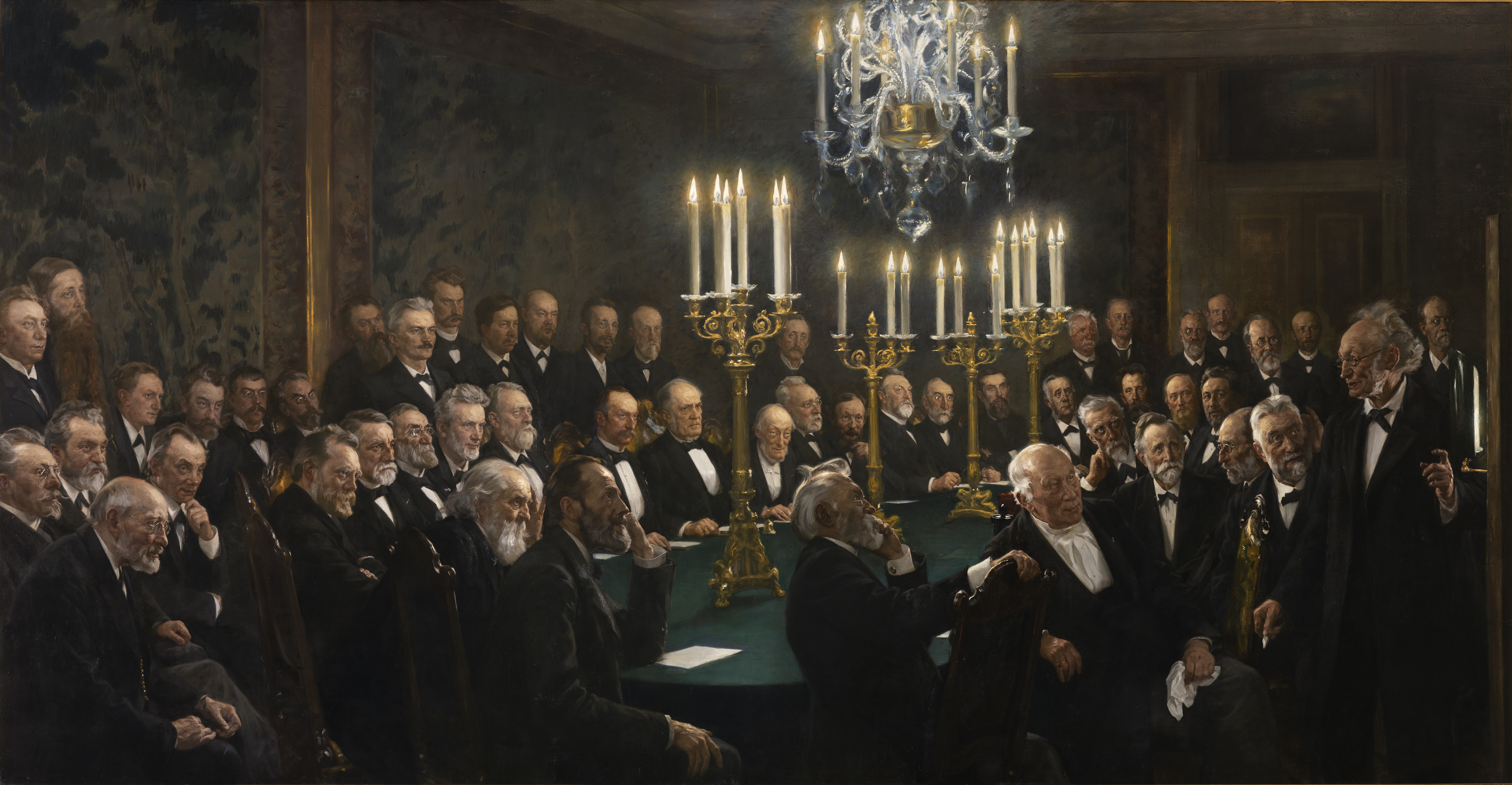
- Artist: Peder Severin Krøyer
- Year: 1897
- Medium: Oil on canvas
- Dimensions: 266.7 cm × 519.4 cm (105.0 in × 204.5 in)
- Location: Royal Danish Academy of Sciences and Letters, Copenhagen

A Meeting in the Royal Danish Academy of Sciences and Letters is a monumental 1897 oil-on-canvas group portrait painting by Peder Severin Krøyer, depicting the membership of Royal Danish Academy of Sciences and Letters during one of its meetings in the Prince's Mansion in Copenhagen. The painting was commissioned by the Carlsberg Foundation in conjunction with the construction of its new building on H. C. Andersens Boulevard. Measuring 519.4 cm (204.5 in) wide and 266.7 cm (105.0 in) tall, it is Krøyer's largest painting.

== History ==
The idea for the painting was first presented by civil servant Andreas Peter Weis (1851–1935) to director of the Carlsberg Foundation Edvard Holm dated 3 August 1895. The idea was later presented to Krøyer in a letter from the Carlsberg Foundation dated 20 October 1895. Krøyer accepted the offer and the price was set at DKK 25,000–30,000.

The painting was handed over to the Carlsberg Foundation in December 1897. It was accessible for the members of the Royal Academy of Science and Letters from 2 to 6 March 1898 and was subsequently on public display as part of the traditional Charlottenborg Spring Exhibition. In January 1900, it was installed in the academy's new premises in the Carlsberg Foundation Building.

In 1900, the painting was temporarily sent to Paris as part of Denmark's contribution to the Exposition Universelle. In 1929, it was on display at the Danish Art Fair in Forum. In 1944, during the Occupation of Denmark in World War II, it was taken down and stored in another location to protect it from possible Schalburgtage. It returned to the building immediately after the war. In 1948, it was moved to the Danish National Gallery to be photographed for the Royal Danish Academy of Sciences and Letters' anniversary publication. In connection with the 100-year anniversary of Krøyer's birth in 1951, it was moved to a new permanent location in the academy's meeting room. Two marble pilasters were removed to make room for the painting. From 18 November to 4 December, in association with a memorial exhibition in the Charlottenborg Exhibition Building, it was possible for the public to see the painting in its new location. From May to September 2019, it was loaned out to Skagens Museum for the exhibition Mesterværker – Krøyer på bestilling.

== People depicted ==
- Johan Ludvig Heiberg
- Kristian Kroman (1846–1925)
- Haldor Topsøe
- Martin Clarentius Gertz (1844–1929)
- Viggo Fausböll
- Jørgen Pedersen Gram
- Harald Høffding
- Carl Julius Salomonsen (1847–1929)
- Christian Bohr
- Johan Henrik Chievitz (1850–1901)
- Christian Christiansen (physicist)
- Holger Frederik Rørdam
- William Sørensen (1848–1916)
- Johannes Steenstrup
- Johan Lange
- Hermann Möller
- Edvard Holm (1833–1915)
- Frederik Vilhelm August Meinert
- Herman Valentiner
- Christian Frederik Lütken
- Karl Verner
- Kristian Erslev
- Crown Prince Frederik (later King Frederik VIII)
- Julius Albert Fridericia (1849–1912)
- Hans Peter Jørgen Julius Thomsen
- Johan Louis Ussing (1820–1905)
- Carl Frederik Pechüle
- Sophus Mads Jørgensen (1837–1914)
- Eugenius Warming
- Ludvig Wimmer
- August Hermann Ferdinand Carl Goos (1835–1912)
- Johannes Nellemann (1831–1906)
- Peter Erasmus Müller
- August Ferdinand Mehren
- Adam Paulsen
- Georg Zachariae (1835–1907)
- Vilhelm Thomsen
- Otto Georg Petersen
- Odin T. Christensen
- Hieronymus Georg Zeuthen
- Adolf Ditlev Jørgensen
- Emil Christian Hansen
- Julius Petersen
- Johan Kjeldahl
- Harald Krabbe (1831–1917)
- Emil Rostrup
- Julius Lange
- Peter Kristian Prytz
- Japetus Steenstrup
- Johan Erik Vesti Boas
- Thorvald N. Thiele

== See also ==
- List of works by Peder Severin Krøyer
