= City Campus (University of Copenhagen) =

Coordinates: 55.688°N 12.570°E

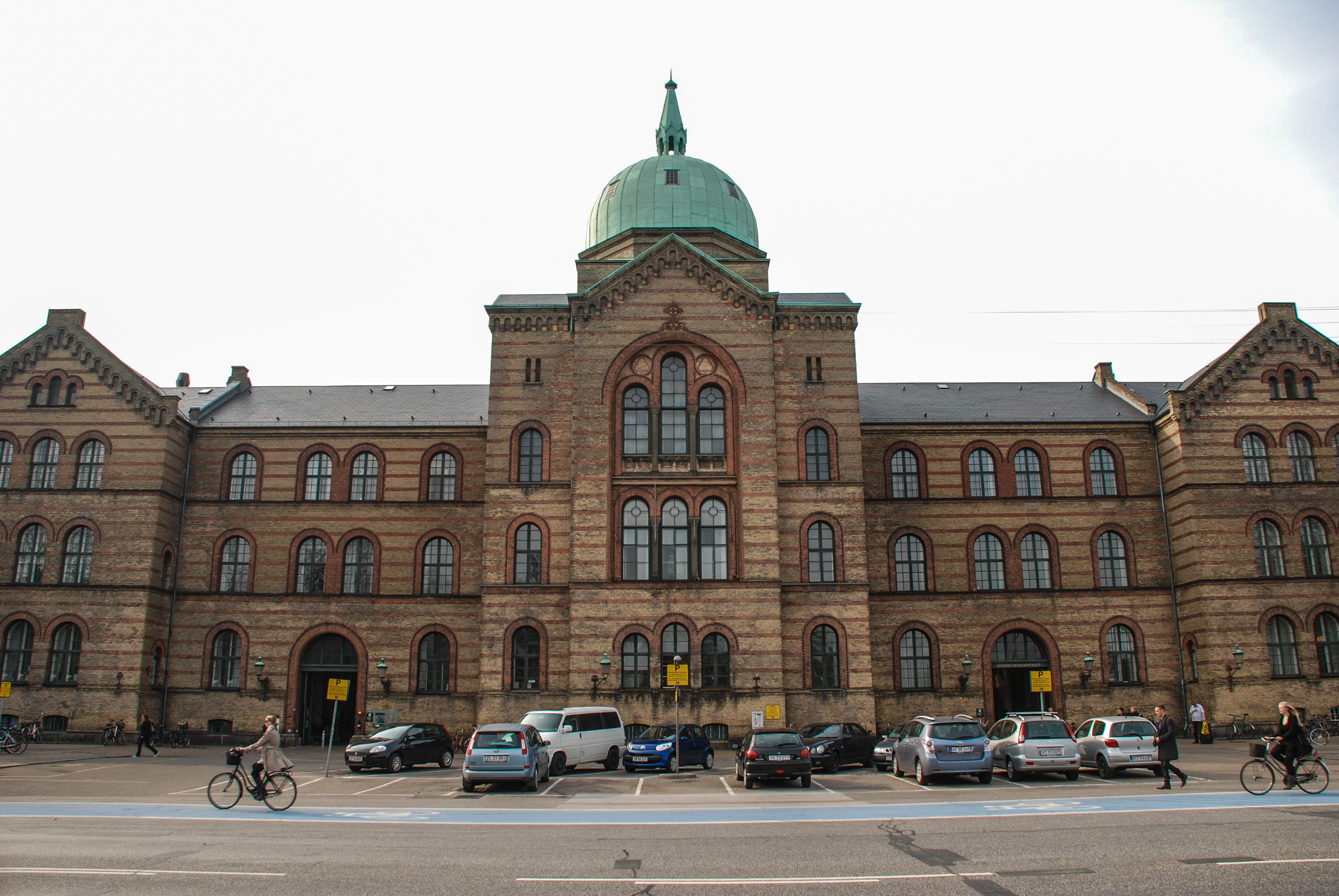
CSS on Øster Farimagsgade

The City Campus is one of the University of Copenhagen's four campuses in Copenhagen, Denmark. It is home to the Faculty of Social Sciences and parts of the Faculty of Health and Medical Sciences and the Faculty of Science. The main campus area, the Center for Health and Society (Danish: Center for Sundhed og Samfund, abbr. CSS), is situated on Øster Farimagsgade, across the street from the University's Botanical Garden, which is also part of the campus area. The City Campus also comprises a building on Øster Voldgade (Mo. 10) and the university headquarters on Frue Plads.

== Overview ==
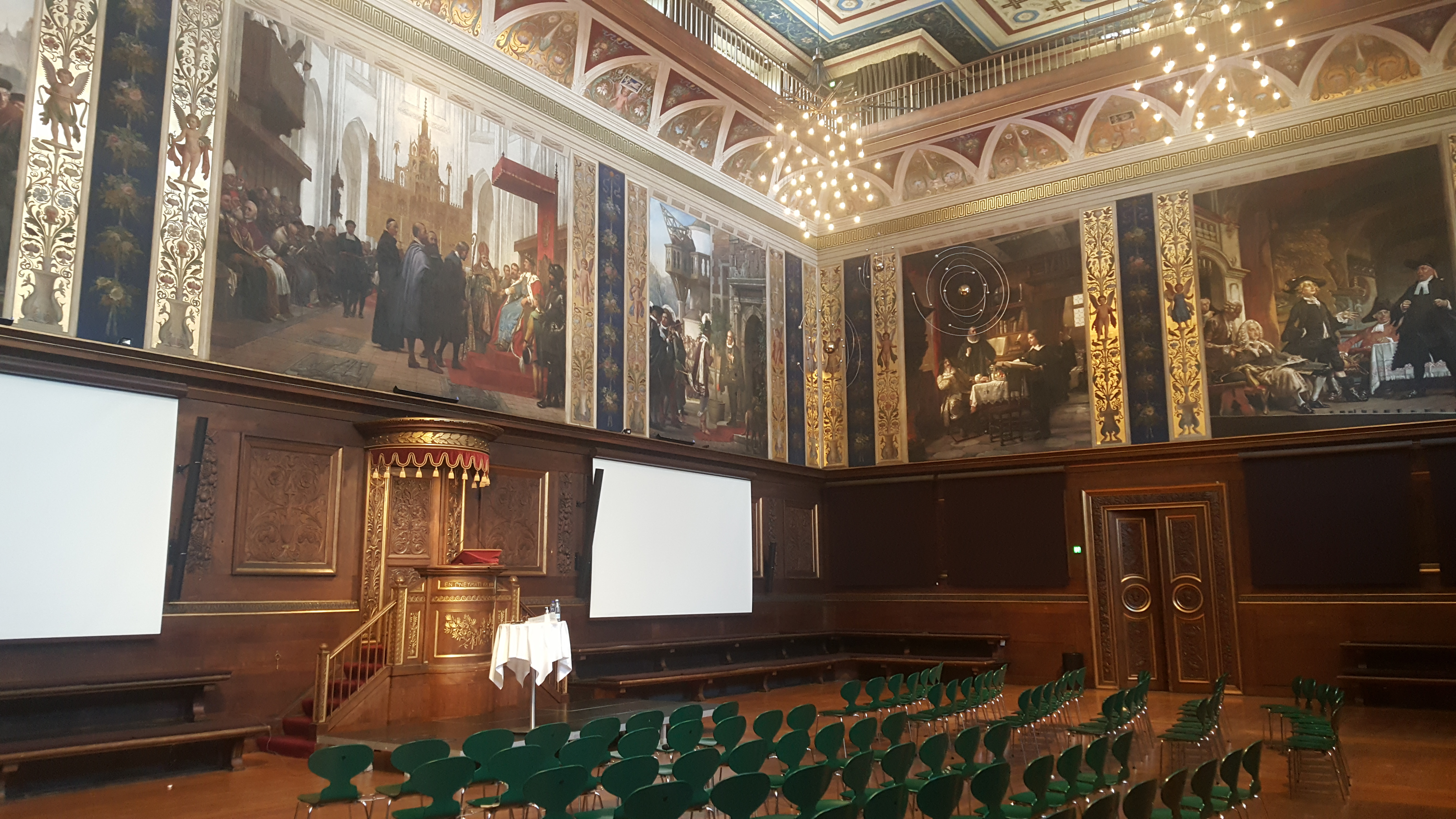
Festsalen in the main building located on Frue Plads.

In all, the City Campus occupies five sites:

- Center for Health and Society
- Copenhagen Botanical Garden (Natural History Museum)
- Geocentre Copenhagen, which is located on Øster Voldgade. It houses the Department of Geography and Geology and the Geological Survey of Denmark and Greenland.
- The University Quadrangle, which is located on Frue Plads and used mainly for administration and representation.

== Center for Health and Society ==
The Center for Health and Society is located in the former Copenhagen Municipal Hospital. As of January 2016, the Centre houses the entire Faculty of Social Sciences, most of the Department of Public Health and the Copenhagen School of Global Health.

=== History ===
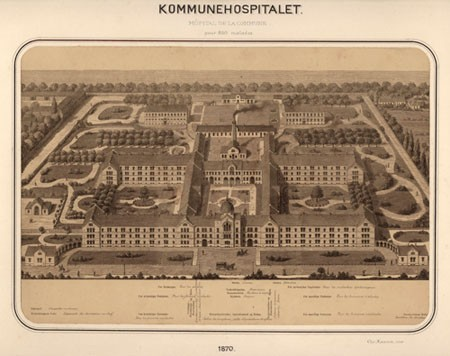
Copenhagen Municipal Hospital

The Copenhagen Municipal Hospital was one of the first buildings to be constructed on the glacis outside of the North Rampart when the fortifications were decommissioned. It was the first major project to be designed by Copenhagen's new city architect, Christian Hansen, who had recently returned to Denmark from Greece. Construction began in 1859 and the hospital was inaugurated on 19 September 1863.

Christian Hansen's original hospital building consisted of two three-story main wings joined together by two connectors. In 1954, the complex was expanded by city architect Frederik Christian Lund in a style similar to that of the original buildings. The Copenhagen Municipal Hospital closed on 1 May 1999. The buildings were then taken over by University of Copenhagen.

In 2005, the university established the Center for Health and Society in the former Copenhagen Municipal Hospital. A new building designed by Erik Møller Arkitekter was completed on the corner of Øster Farimagsgade and Gammeltoftsgade in 2013. It contains auditoriums for the University as well as a daycare for children of university faculty.

== Copenhagen Botanical Garden ==
The University of Copenhagen Botanical Garden covers an area of 10 hectares and is particularly noted for its extensive complex of historical glasshouses. The garden is part of the Natural History Museum of Denmark, which is itself part of the University of Copenhagen's Faculty of Science. It serves both research, educational and recreational purposes.

The Botanical Garden had previously been located at Charlottenborg Palace, and was relocated to its new site in 1870.
