= Johan Ludvig Heiberg (philologist) =

Danish philologist and historian

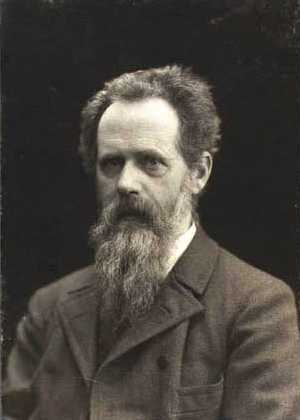
J. L. Heiberg

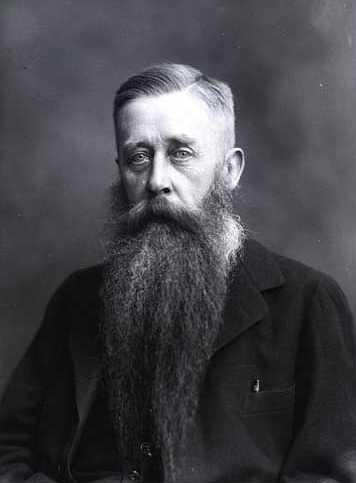
J. L. Heiberg in 1918

Johan Ludvig Heiberg (27 November 1854 – 4 January 1928) was a Danish philologist and historian. He is best known for his discovery of previously unknown texts in the Archimedes Palimpsest, and for his edition of Euclid's Elements that T. L. Heath translated into English. He also published an edition of Ptolemy's Almagest.

== Early life and education ==
Heiberg was born in Aalborg, the son of medical doctor Emil Theodor Heiberg (1820–93) and Johanne (Hanne) Henriette Jacoba Schmidt (1821–83). He was related to 19th-century Danish poet Johan Ludvig Heiberg (1791–1860). His sister, Johanne Louise Heiberg (1860–1934), married biochemist Max Henius (1859–1935).

Heiberg matriculated from Aalborg Cathedral School in 1871. He acquired a degree in classical philology from the University of Copenhagen in 1876 and spent the next few years teaching. He acquired a doctorate degree with the dissertation Quæstiones Archimedeæ in 1879.

== Career ==
From 1884 to 1896, alongside first Søren Georg Møller (1834–1890) and then Søren Ludvig Tuxen (1850–1919), he was principal of Borgerdyd School in Østerbro. Heiberg was Professor of Classical Philology at the University of Copenhagen from 1896 until 1924 and Professor of Archeology from 1896 until 1911. He became a member of the Royal Danish Academy of Sciences and Letters in 1893 and served as its editor in 1902–13. He was president of Rask-Ørstedfondet from 1919 until his death in Copenhagen. Among his more than 200 publications were translations of the works of Archimedes (1880 and 1912), Euclid (with Heinrich Menge) (1883–1916), Apollonius of Perga (1891–93), Serenus of Antinouplis (1896), Ptolemy (1898/1903), and Hero of Alexandria (1899). Many of his editions are still in use today.

=== Archimedes Palimpsest ===
The Archimedes Palimpsest is a 10th-century parchment codex palimpsest. Heiberg inspected the vellum manuscript in the library of The Church of the Holy Sepulchre at Istanbul in 1906, and realized that it contained mathematical works by Archimedes that were unknown to scholars at the time. Heiberg was permitted by the Greek Orthodox Church to take photographs of the palimpsest's pages, and from these he produced transcriptions, published between 1910 and 1915 in a complete works of Archimedes. Heiberg's examination of the manuscript was with the naked eye only, while modern analysis of the texts has employed X-ray and ultraviolet light. The Archimedes Palimpsest is currently stored at the Walters Art Museum in Baltimore, Maryland.

== Personal life ==
On 6 April 1879, he was married to Cathrine Asmussen (7 October 1856 – 25 August 1929), daughter of first lieutenant and later captain Michael Overgaard Asmussen (1827–92) and Laura Nicoline Margrethe Johnsen (1830–92).

Heiberg is one of the men seen in Peder Severin Krøyer's monumental 1897 group portrait painting A Meeting in the Royal Danish Academy of Sciences and Letters. He was also painted by Harald Slott-Møller (c. 1900, Frederiksborg Museum) and by Niels Vinding Dorph (1907, Frederiksborg Museum). He is also seen in drawings by Alfred Schmidt (Frederiksborg Museum) and Aage Roose (1924, Frederiksborg Museum).

Heiberg was created a Knight in the Order of the Dannebrog in 1907 and a Commander Second Class in 1924. He was awarded the Cross of Honour in 1916.

The French Academy of Sciences awarded him the Prix Binoux for 1912.

== Notable students ==
- Ingeborg Hammer-Jensen, philologist and historian of science.

== Selected works ==
- Glossae medicinales (1924)
- Attiske Gravmæler (1895)
- Euclidis Opera omnia (1883–1916), Leipzig, Teubner, 9 volumes (including the Elements in volumes 1–5, 1883–1888), with Heinrich Menge
- Quæstiones Archimedeæ (1879)
