= University of Copenhagen Symphony Orchestra =

Orchestra group in Copenhagen university

The University of Copenhagen Symphony Orchestra
- Orchestra
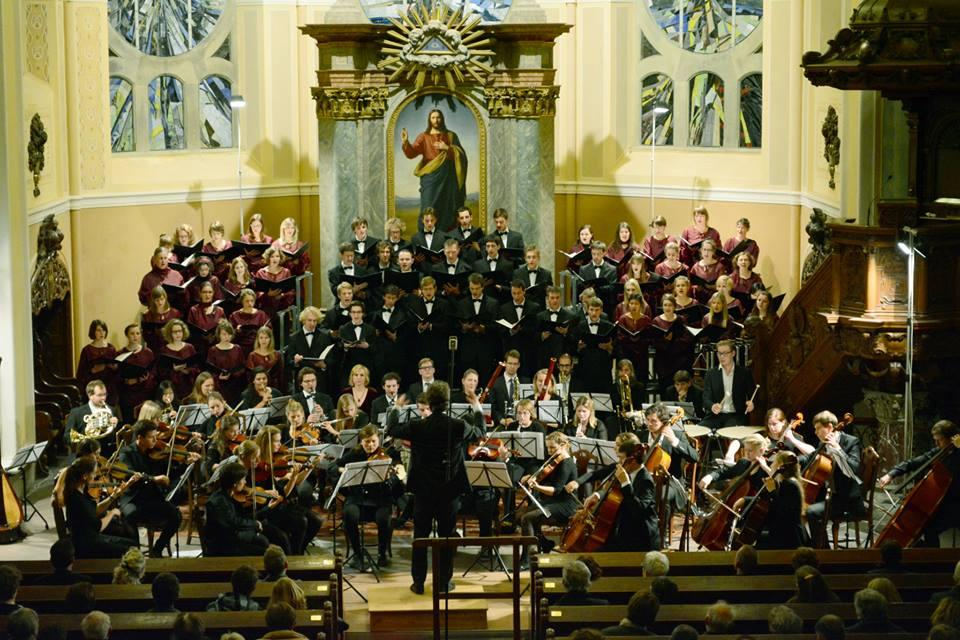
- SymfUni together with Universitätschor Dresden, November 2013
- Short name: SymfUni
- Founded: 2007
- Location: Frederiksberg
- Principal conductor: Bram Kortekaas
- Website: www.symfuni.dk

The University of Copenhagen Symphony Orchestra, also called "SymfUni" is an orchestra that was founded by a group of students at the University of Copenhagen in 2007. It is based in Frederiksberg, Copenhagen.

== General information ==
SymfUni was founded in 2007 by a group of students at the University of Copenhagen. At this moment, the orchestra consists of about 60 students from all kinds of study programs at the University of Copenhagen as well as a large group of international students and students from other universities in the Copenhagen metropolitan area. SymfUni has collaborated with different choirs and in spring 2012 the orchestra travelled to the Netherlands to perform Niels Gade’s Erl King's Daughter together with a Dutch student choir from Nijmegen. In April 2015, SymfUni attended the European Student Orchestra Festival in Leuven, Belgium.

== Repertoire ==
The orchestra has played a number of concerts around Europe with a broad repertoire – from Beethoven to Bizet.

In autumn 2013 SymfUni collaborated with Universitätschor Dresden and played amongst others God in Disguise by Lars-Erik Larsson and Vom Himmel hoch by Felix Mendelssohn. In spring 2014 the orchestra played movie music, amongst others E.T. - Adventures on Earth and Raider's March by John Williams. Winter 2014 the orchestra played amongst others in Koncertkirken in Nørrebro. On the repertoire was Aleksandr Borodin's Polovtsian Dances, Swan Lake by Tchaikovsky and Piano Concerto No. 2 by Sergei Rachmaninoff. In the spring 2015, SymfUni performed amongst others Carl Nielsen's Aladdin and music from Elverhøj by Friedrich Kuhlau in the Katholieke Universiteit Leuven and in the Church of Our Saviour, Copenhagen.

== Conductors ==
- 2007-2009: Frederik Støvring Olsen
- 2009- 2010 Kristoffer Kaas
- 2010- 2013 Jan Scheerer
- 2014- 2017 Peter Piotr Gasior
- 2017- Bram Kortekaas
