= Ingeborg Hammer-Jensen =

Danish classical philologist and historian of science (1880–1955)

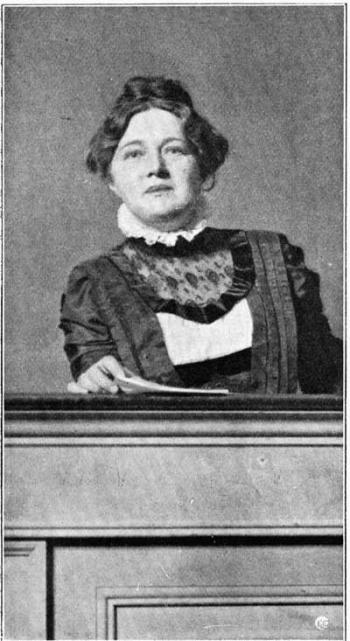
- Born: Ingeborg Ellen Hammer; 20 January 1880; Copenhagen, Denmark
- Died: 6 April 1955 (aged 75); Copenhagen, Denmark
- Occupations: Classical scholar, philologist

Academic background
- Education: University of Copenhagen
- Thesis: Den ældste Atomlære - The Oldest Atomic Theory (1908)

Academic work
- Notable works: The Oldest Alchemy

Ingeborg Hammer-Jensen (20 January 1880 – 6 April 1955) was a historian of science and classical philologist from Denmark. She was the third woman to be awarded a PhD in Denmark and was an expert on Greek scientific writing.

== Early life ==
Ingeborg Ellen Hammer was born on 20 January 1880 in Copenhagen. Her parents were choir director and herbalist Axel Evald Hammer, and her mother was Thora Christine Svendsen. She attended N. Zahle's School, where she learnt Mathematics and Greek, amongst other subjects, where she got excellent marks.

== Education ==
In 1898 she began to study classical philology at the University of Copenhagen, where she was inspired by the work of Professor J L Heiberg and H G Zeuthen to research the scientific writings of classical writers. Her first article was published in 1902 in the Nordic Journal of Classical Philology. In 1905 she graduated with an MA in Classical Philology.

Hammer-Jensen continued her research and in 1908 graduated with a D.Phil. in Classical Philology from the University of Copenhagen. Her thesis was entitled The Oldest Atomic Theory and argued that Plato was influenced by Democritus' natural theory. Whilst this idea was not entirely original, Hammer-Jensen's work became influential because she promoted her ideas with energy. She was the first female recipient of a doctorate in Classics in Denmark, and the country's third female PhD overall (preceded by Anna Hude in 1893 and Kirstine Thaning in 1904).

== Research ==
Hammer-Jensen's research focused on science in the classical world, particularly the works of Aristotle, Democritus and Heron. Her critique of Aristotle's Metereology IV argued against it being Aristotelian in origin and is one that has been cited repeatedly. She wrote about potential relationships between the work of Democritus and Plato. She worked on dating the works of Heron to after the time of Ptolemy, basing this assertion on Heron's apparently superior scientific instruments and a potential criticism of Ptolemy's views on weight and volume relating to water. Her doctoral thesis advanced the idea that Democritus influenced Plato, and gained a substantial amount of attention after its publication.

In her later work The Oldest Alchemy, Hammer-Jensen examined the works of writes Zosimos, Olympiodor and Stephanos to explore ideas around the transition of materials from one form to another. However, one reviewer described her work as "fanciful". In it she emphasised a close relationship between medicine and alchemy, based on their experimental processes. However this idea was criticised by others who believed the awareness of medicine shown by these authors was what would be expected by an educated person at the time.

== Later life ==
On 11 October 1905, she married teacher Jens Christian Jensen; he wrote a widely used school textbook on natural science.

Hammer-Jensen died on 6 April 1955 at Bispebjerg Hospital in Copenhagen.

== Selected publications ==
- 'Ad Solonem', Nordic Journal of Classical Philology (1903)
- Demokrit und Platon: I-II (1909)
- 'Ptolemaios und Heron', Hermes (1913)
- 'Das sogenannte IV. Buch der Meteorologie des Aristoteles', Hermes (1915)
- Deux papyrus à contenu d'ordre chimique - Ingeborg Hammer Jensen (Reitzel, 1916)
- Die alteste Alchemie, Meddelelser fra den K. Danske Videnskabernes Selskab, Hist-fil. Meddel., IV, no. 2 (Copenhagen, 1921)
- Catalogue des manuscrits alchimiques grecs: Volume 2: Les manuscrits italiens (1927) with Carlo Oreste Zuretti, Otto Lagercrantz, Johan Ludvig Heiberg, Domenico Bassi and Emidio Martini
- 'Die Heronische Frage', Hermes (1928)
