= Al-Dimashqi (geographer) =

Syrian traveler and geographer (1256–1327)

Shams al-Din al-Ansari al-Dimashqi شمس الدين الأنصاري الدمشقي
- Title: al-Dimashqi

Personal life
- Born: 1256 CE
- Died: 1327 CE
- Era: Mamluk
- Region: Greater Syria
- Main interest(s): History and Geography
- Occupation: Arab geographer

Religious life
- Religion: Islam

Sheikh Shams al-Din al-Ansari al-Dimashqi or simply al-Dimashqi (Arabic: شمس الدين الأنصاري الدمشقي) (1256–1327) was a medieval Arab geographer, completing his main work in 1300. Born in Damascus—as his name "Dimashqi" implies—he mostly wrote of his native land, the Greater Syria (Bilad ash-Sham), upon the complete withdrawal of the Crusaders. He became a contemporary of the Mamluk sultan Baibars, the general who led the Muslims in war against the Crusaders. His work is of value in connection with the Crusader Chronicles. He died while in Safad, in 1327.

Al-Dimashqi (1325) gives detailed accounts of islands in Maritime Southeast Asia, its inhabitants, flora, fauna and customs. He mentions "the country of Champa...is inhabited by Muslims and idolaters. Islam arrived there during the time of Caliph Uthman...and Ali, many Muslims who were expelled by the Umayyads and by Al-Hajjaj, fled there, and since then a majority of the Cham have embraced Islam."

Of their rivals the Khmer, Al-Dimashqi (1325) mentions they inhabit the island of Komor (Khmer), also called Malay Island, are many towns and cities, rich-dense forests with huge, tall trees, and white elephants; they supplemented their income from the trade routes not only by exporting ivory and aloe, but also by engaging in piracy and raiding on Muslim and Chinese shipping.

Al-Dimaski's writings on Syria were published in St. Petersburg in 1866 by M.A.F Mehren, and this edition was later used for the English translation by Guy Le Strange in 1890.

== Bibliography ==
- le Strange, Guy (1890). Palestine Under the Moslems: A Description of Syria and the Holy Land from A.D. 650 to 1500. Committee of the Palestine Exploration Fund., London,
