= Bjørn Aage Ibsen =

Danish anesthetist who invented intensive care medicine (1915–2007)

- Born: 30 August 1915; Copenhagen, Denmark
- Died: 7 August 2007 (aged 91); Copenhagen
- Education: University of Copenhagen
- Known for: Inventor of intensive-care unit
- Scientific career
- Fields: Intensive-care medicine, anaesthesia

Bjørn Aage Ibsen (30 August 1915 – 7 August 2007) was a Danish anaesthetist and founder of intensive-care medicine. He also invented one of the first functional positive pressure ventilators, which saved many lives during the poliomyelitis epidemic in Denmark 1952-1953.

== Education ==
Ibsen graduated in 1940 from medical school at the University of Copenhagen and trained in anaesthesiology from 1949 to 1950 at the Massachusetts General Hospital, Boston.

== Career ==
Ibsen became involved in the 1952 poliomyelitis outbreak in Denmark, where 2,722 patients developed the illness in a 6-month period with 316 suffering respiratory or airway paralysis. Treatment had involved the use of the few negative pressure ventilators available, but these devices, while helpful, were limited and did not protect against aspiration of secretions. After detecting high levels of CO_{2} in blood samples and inside a little boy's lung, Ibsen changed management directly. He instituted protracted positive pressure ventilation by means of intubation into the trachea, and enlisting 200 medical students to manually pump oxygen and air into the patients lungs. The first patient treated this way and whose life was saved, was 12-year-old Vivi Ebert, who had serious bulbar polio. In this fashion, mortality declined from 90% to around 25%. Patients were managed in three special 35 bed areas, which aided charting and other management.

In 1953, Ibsen set up the world's first medical/surgical intensive care unit in a converted student nurse classroom in Kommunehospitalet (The Municipal Hospital) in Copenhagen, and provided one of the first accounts of the management of tetanus with muscle relaxants and controlled ventilation. In 1954, Ibsen was elected head of the department of anaesthesiology at that institution. He jointly authored the first known account of ICU management principles in Nordisk Medicin, 18 September 1958: 'Arbejdet på en Anæsthesiologisk Observationsafdeling' ("The Work in an Anaesthesiologic Observation Unit") with Tone Dahl Kvittingen from Norway.
