= University of Copenhagen Faculty of Social Sciences =

Coordinates: 55.6871°N 12.5704°E

Faculty of Social Sciences
- Det samfundsvidenskabelige fakultet
- Type: Public university
- Established: 1848 (as an independent faculty)
- Dean: Troels Østergaard Sørensen
- Administrative staff: 1000
- Students: 6500
- Doctoral students: 180
- Location: Copenhagen, Denmark
- Campus: City Campus
- Affiliations: EUA, LAOTSE
- Website: www.samf.ku.dk/english/

The Faculty of Social Sciences at the University of Copenhagen is divided into five departments, where research and teaching are carried out in the fields of Economics, Political Science, International Politics, Management, Anthropology, Psychology and Sociology. The faculty prepares students for the Bachelor's degree (BA), the Master's degree, and the Ph.D. in the fields of Economics, Political Science, Anthropology, Sociology, Psychology and Social Studies.
