= Aging Research and Drug Discovery =

Non-profit conference

- Status: Active
- Genre: Academic, Industry
- Begins: 2014
- Venue: Grand Ceremonial Hall, University of Copenhagen
- Locations: Copenhagen, Denmark, New York, United States
- Established: 2014
- Most recent: 2024
- Next event: 2025
- Attendance: 2500
- Organizer: University of Copenhagen and Columbia University
- Website: www.agingpharma.org

Aging Research and Drug Discovery (ARDD) is a non-profit conference which is organized by University of Copenhagen and Columbia University every year at University of Copenhagen.

== History ==
The first ARDD conference was held in 2014 at Basel, Switzerland. Then, this conference was known as Aging Forum and it was a part of MipTec and Basel Life Congresses. The conference was intended to bring together the Pharmaceutical industry, leading academics, Investors and Startups.
