= Carl Julius Salomonsen =

Danish bacteriologist

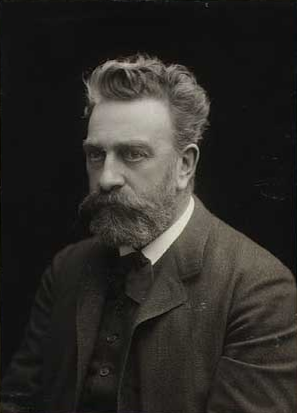

Carl Julius Salomonsen (6 December 1847 – 14 November 1924) was a Danish bacteriologist who is considered the father of bacteriology in Denmark. He developed techniques for isolating microbes and for extracting pure cultures apart from some staining techniques.

Salomonesen was born in Copenhagen to physician and epidemiologist Martin and his wife Eva Henriques. He took an interest in medical matters from an early age and after studying at the Metropolitan School he obtained an MD in 1871 from the University of Copenhagen. His main interests where in pathology and parasitology but he worked with his father as a physician in his early years followed by work at the pathology department at Almindelig. Later he became interested in bacterial breakdown of blood and he obtained a doctorate for his dissertation on his research in 1877. He developed a technique of maintaining blood in capillary tubes within which bacterial colonies could be seen as spots. Breaking of the portions allowed him to extract what he claimed were pure extracts of a single bacterial species. Through his friends and family, he met Rudolf Virchow and served as his personal secretary. He worked in Wroclaw under Julius Cohnheim on tuberculosis. He also met Louis Pasteur in Paris, Robert Koch and Paul Ehrlich in Germany, before returning to Copenhagen where he worked at the Municipal Hospital. He conducted experiments on Streptococcus obtained from pus that he injected into rabbits to produce an infection. He conducted experiments on radium and the effects of radiation on blood. In 1883 he became a lecturer in medical bacteriology and in 1885 he published a textbook on bacteriology. He became a full professor in 1893. He directed the State Serum Institute which was founded in 1902 until 1909 when his colleague Thorvald Madsen took over. He founded the Danish Museum for medical history in 1907, lobbied for free medical education, and conducted numerous studies and collaborated widely. In 1910, while working as dean of the university, he wrote a history of epidemiology.

Salomonsen was also interested in art, collected works, and wrote on the subject. He suffered from osteoarthritis in his late life and was affected by the death of his wife Ellen Henriques and daughter before him.
