= Christian Hansen (architect) =

Danish architect (1803–1883)

Hans Christian Hansen
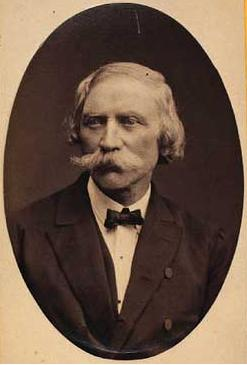
- Born: 20 April 1803; Copenhagen, Denmark
- Died: 2 May 1883 (aged 80); Vienna, Austria
- Education: Royal Danish Academy of Fine Arts
- Occupation: Architect
- Buildings: National and Kapodistrian University of Athens; Copenhagen Municipal Hospital; Østervold Observatory

Hans Christian Hansen (20 April 1803 – 2 May 1883) was a Historicist Danish architect who worked 18 years in Greece where he was active in the transformation of Athens from a small town to the country's capital and an international metropolis. Later in his career he returned to Denmark, where he became a professor at the Royal Danish Academy of Fine Arts and designed buildings such as the Copenhagen Municipal Hospital and the Østervold Observatory. He was the brother of Theophilus Hansen who was also an internationally successful architect, active in Athens and Vienna. He is considered to be a pioneer in the study and application of polychrome architecture.

== Biography ==
=== Early life and career ===
Christian Hansen was born in Copenhagen. He attended the Royal Danish Academy of Fine Arts in Copenhagen from 1816, just 13 years old, where he studied under Christian Frederik Hansen, the leading Danish architect of the time, and Gustav Friedrich Hetsch. Christian Frederik Hansen taught him a rational approach to architecture and Hetsch introduced him to Karl Friedrich Schinkel whose influence he had brought to Denmark.

In 1831 Christian Hansen won the Academy's large gold medal and a travel scholarship. He then set out on a journey to Italy and Greece, first spending two years in Italy, mainly in Rome and Sicily.

=== Years in Athens ===
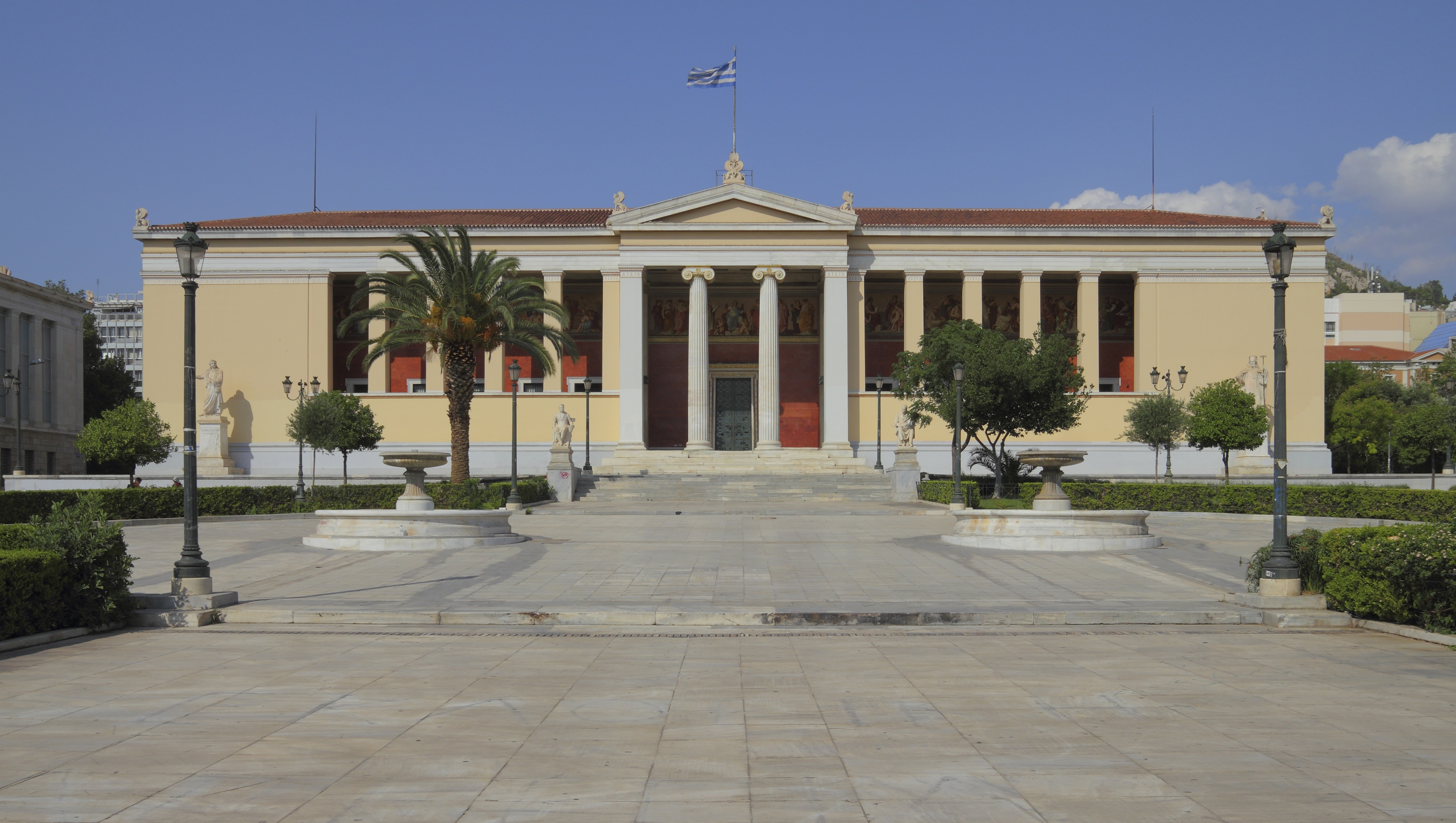
The University in Athens

In 1833, Hansen travelled to Athens, recently been chosen as the new capital of the nascent Greece which had recently gained its independence from the Ottoman Empire. At the time, Athens was just a small village with a few thousand inhabitants, chosen as capital for historic and sentimental reasons. It was therefore set for massive redevelopment to become a modern metropolis. Hansen won the favour of King Otto of Greece and was appointed Court Architect in 1834. In 1838, he was joined by his brother Theophilus who had also studied architecture at the Academy in Copenhagen but had been unsuccessful in getting commissions.

Christian Hansen's most famous work in Athens is the original main building for the National and Kapodistrian University of Athens. Construction started in 1839 using the proceeds of a fund-raising campaign from Greeks at home and abroad. It was inaugurated in 1841, though not entirely completed until 1864 due to lack of funds. It is built in marble in Greek Revival style, also known as Neohellenic Classicism, of which it is considered one of the most important examples and a source of inspiration for many other buildings of the time, particularly in Germany. It is part of the so-called Neoclassical, or Athenian, Trilogy which was completed by his brother with the Academy of Athens and the National Library of Greece.

Hansen also designed private houses and churches. The latter include the Anglican St. Paul's Church. It is designed in a mixed Victorian and Gothic Revival style.

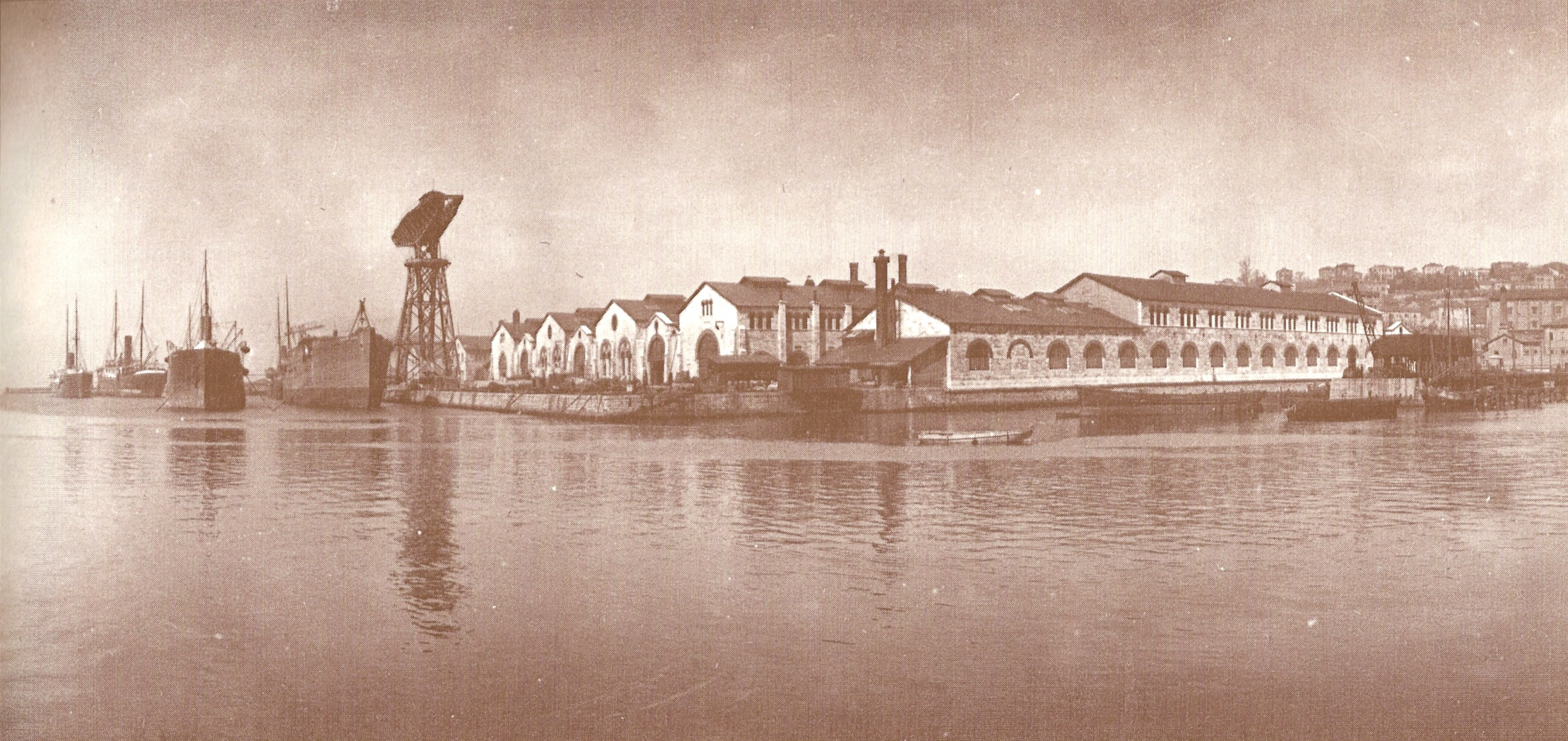
Österreichischer Lloyd's Arsenal and Dockyards at Trieste, c. 1900

Hansen's work in Athens also involved archeological excavations and investigations. Together with the German architect Eduard Schaubert he excavated and reconstructed the Temple of Athena Nike at the Acropolis and he contributed to the compilation of material for Joseph Hoffer's account of horizontal curvature and optical corrections in Greek temples.

Hansen's reputation reached outside Greece and in 1850 the shipping company Österreichischer Lloyd commissioned him to build a marine arsenal and dockyards at Trieste. The extensive building complex designed in the Rundbogenstil with details inspired by Byzantine architecture was constructed from 1852 to 1856.

=== Homecoming and work in Denmark ===
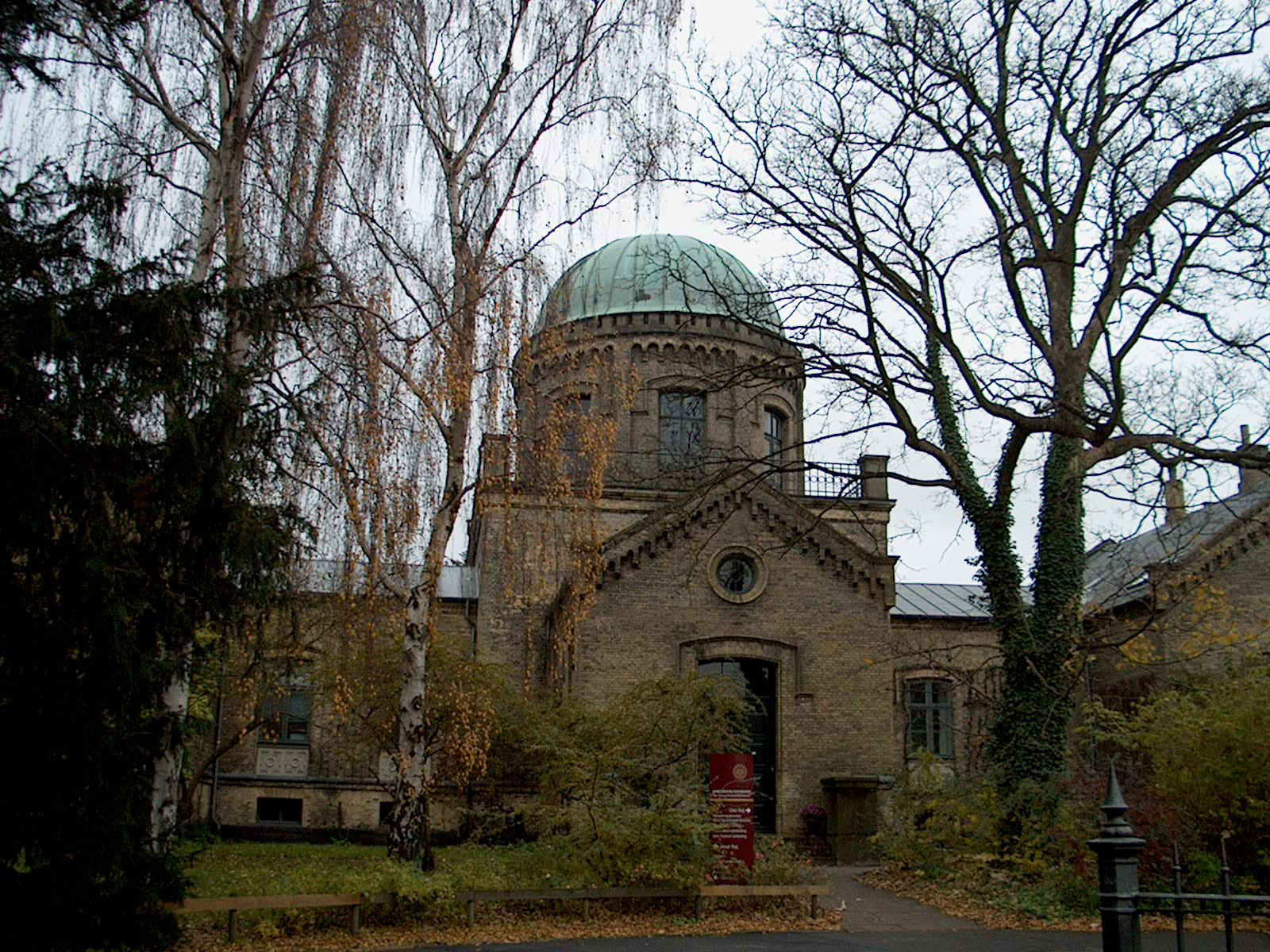
Østervold Observatory, 1861

After the revolt in September 1843 in Athens, a nationalist wave made it hard for foreigners to work in Greece. In 1851, Hansen returned to Denmark after almost 20 years abroad. He was appointed Royal Building Inspector for Funen and the surrounding islands but had to let someone else, C. A. Møller, temporarily take care of his obligations due to his engagements with Lloyds in Trieste.

In 1867, he became a member of the Academy in Copenhagen and Royal Building Inspector for Zealand, Lolland and Falster. That same year he also took over the professorial chair in architecture at the Academy which had become vacant with Michael Gottlieb Bindesbøll's death the year before.

As a practicing architect, Hansen never got the prominent role in Denmark upon his return which could have been expected after his achievements abroad. In Copenhagen he built the Municipal Hospital in the Rundbogenstil which he had also applied in Trieste. His Østervold Observatory was built on the former fortifications of the city to replace the astronomical observatory at the Round Tower. For the University of Copenhagen he also designed a Zoological Museum in Krystalgade in Renaissance Revival style. The building is today used by the university's administration but the lavishly decorated Grand Hall, where the large, stuffed animals used to be on display, is frequently used for exhibitions.

Christian Hansen died in 1883 and is interred at Assistens Cemetery.

His great-great granddaughter, Dinah Jane Hansen, is in the girl group Fifth Harmony. She has shown support to him on her visit to Denmark on October 22, 2016.

== Selected buildings ==
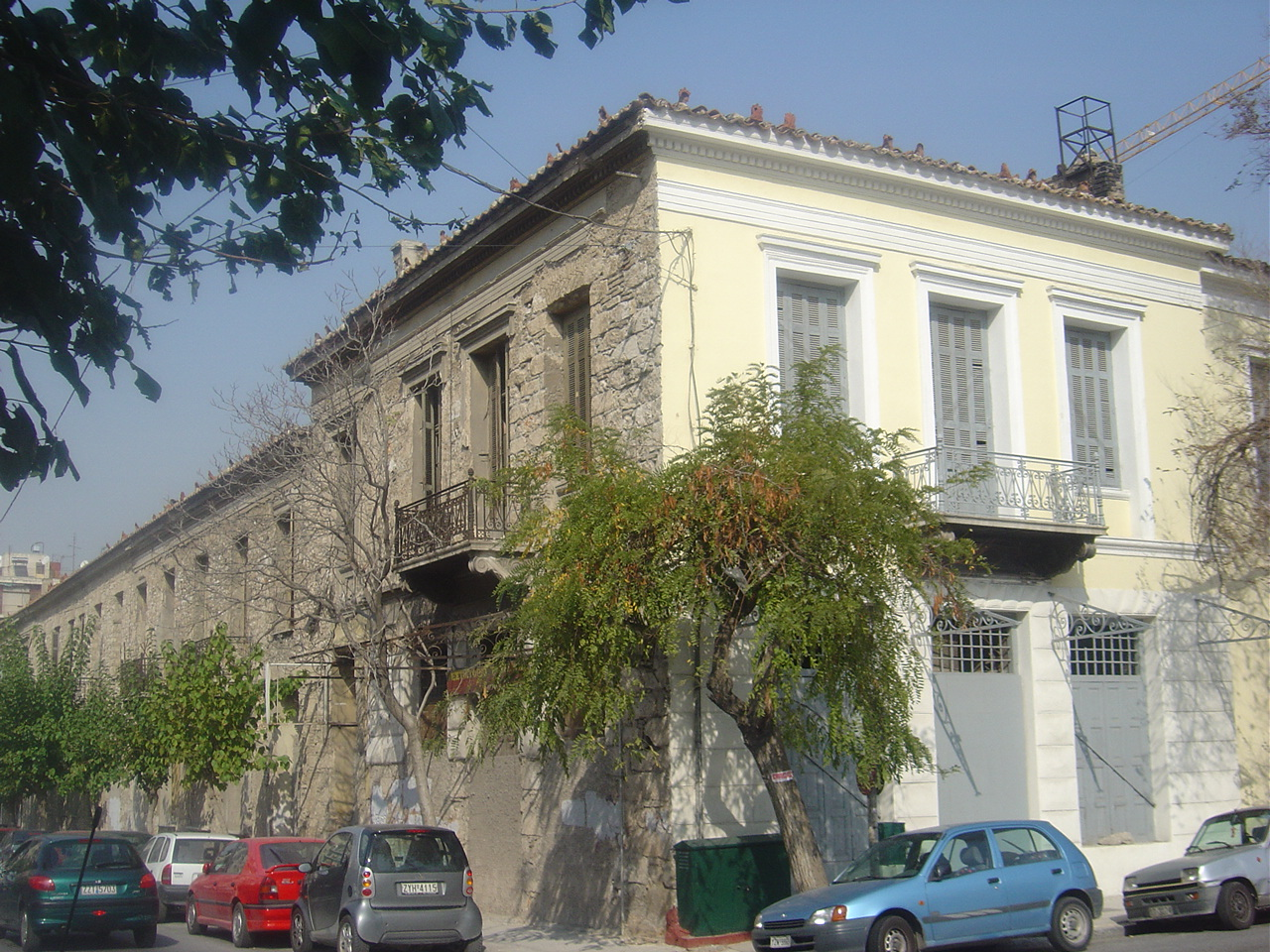
The Kantakouzinos building in Athens

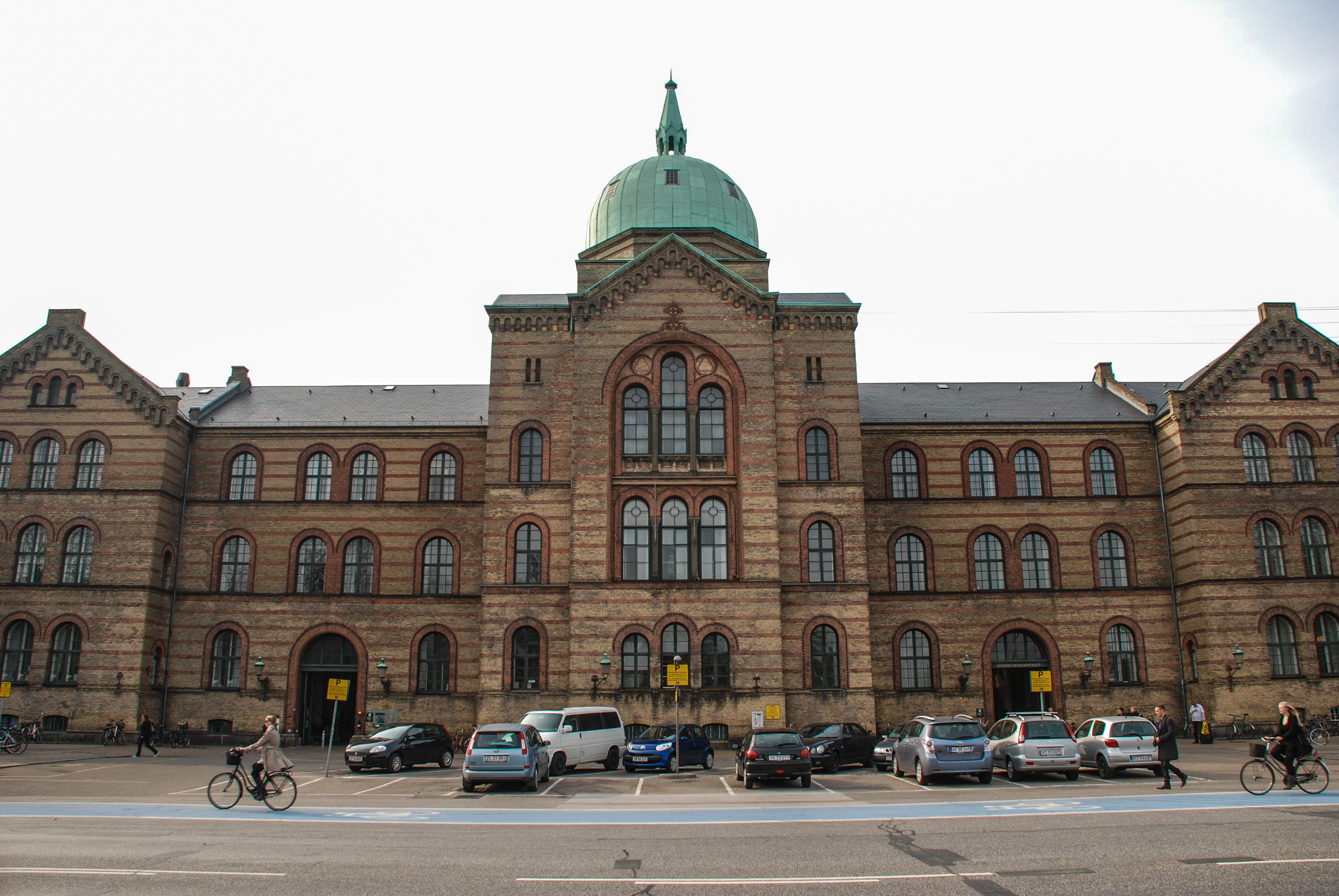
Copenhagen Municipal Hospital

- The Mint, Athens (1834–6)
- National and Kapodistrian University of Athens, Athens (1837–50)
- St. Paul's Church, Athens (1838–1841)
- Eye Clinic, Athens
- Crown Prince's Palace, Athens
- Hotel for Österreichischer Lloyd, Loutraki, Greece
- Arsenal and Dockyards, Trieste (1852–56),
- Copenhagen Municipal Hospital, Copenhagen (1856–63)
- Østervold Observatory, Copenhagen (1859–61)
- Museum of Zoology, Krystalgade, Copenhagen (1863–1869)
- Valkendorfs Kollegium (student residence), Sankt Peders Stræde, Copenhagen (1865–66)
- Roman Bathhouse, Tordenskjoldsgade, Copenhagen (1868, since rebuilt)
- St. Nicolai's Church, Holbæk, (1868–72)
- Christiansdal Abbey, Næstved (1870–71)
- St. Joseph's Hospital, Griffenfeldsgade, Copenhagen (1873–75, later extensions 1881 og 1904)
- Palm House complex, University of Copenhagen Botanical Garden (1874)
