= University of Copenhagen =

Public university in Copenhagen, Denmark

Coordinates: 55°40′47″N 12°34′21″E

- Københavns Universitet
- Latin: Universitas Hauniensis or Hafniensis
- Motto: Latin: Coelestem adspicit lucem
- Motto in English: It (the eagle) beholds the celestial light
- Type: Public research university
- Established: 1 June 1479; 547 years ago
- Academic affiliations: IARU; LERU; EUA; Europaeum; Universities Denmark
- Budget: DKK 8.908 bn ($1.338 bn) (2018)
- Rector: David Dreyer Lassen
- Academic staff: 5,286 (2019)
- Administrative staff: 4,119 (2017)
- Students: 37,493 (2019)
- Undergraduates: 21,394 (2019)
- Postgraduates: 16,079 (2019)
- Doctoral students: 3,106 (2016)
- Location: Copenhagen, Denmark
- Campus: Urban 94.2 ha (total)
- Student newspaper: Uniavisen
- Colors: Maroon and gray
- Website: www.ku.dk

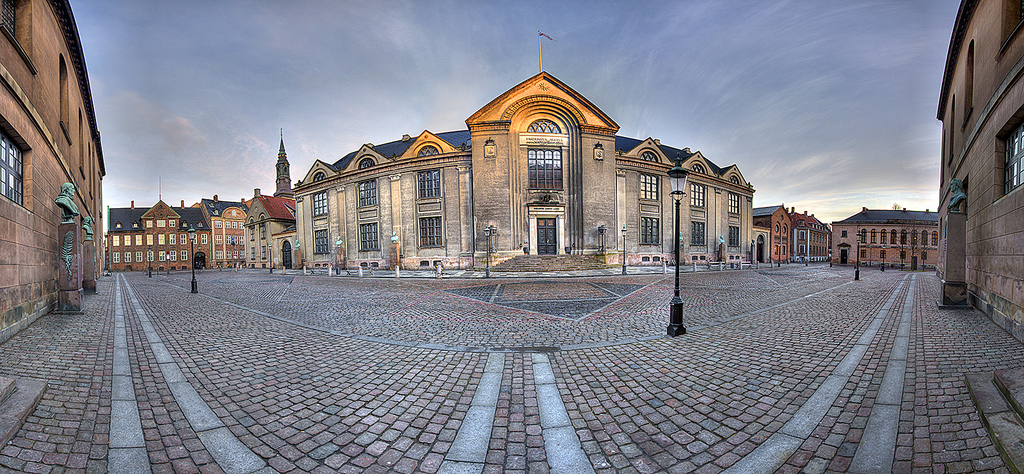
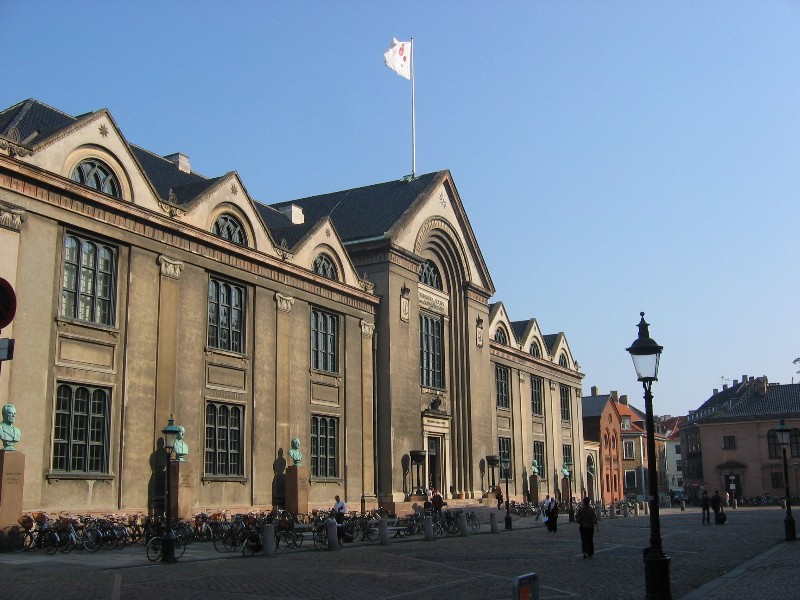
University Main Building at Frue Plads

The University of Copenhagen (Danish: Københavns Universitet, abbr. KU) is a public research university in Copenhagen, Denmark. Founded in 1479, the University of Copenhagen is the second-oldest university in Scandinavia, after Uppsala University.

The University of Copenhagen consists of six different faculties, with teaching taking place in its four distinct campuses, all situated in Copenhagen. The university operates 36 different departments and 122 separate research centres in Copenhagen, as well as a number of museums and botanical gardens in and outside the Danish capital. The University of Copenhagen also owns and operates multiple research stations around Denmark, with two additional ones located in Greenland. Additionally, the Faculty of Health and Medical Sciences and the public hospitals of the Capital and Zealand Region of Denmark constitute the conglomerate Copenhagen University Hospital.

As of October 2022, 10 Nobel laureates and 1 Turing Award laureate have been affiliated with the University of Copenhagen as students, alumni or faculty. Alumni include one president of the United Nations General Assembly and at least 37 prime ministers of Denmark.

== History ==
The University of Copenhagen was founded on 1 June 1479 and is the oldest university in Denmark. In 1475, Christian I of Denmark received a papal bull from Pope Sixtus IV with permission to establish a university in Denmark. The bull was issued on 19 June 1475 as a result of the visit to Rome by Christian I's wife, Dorothea of Brandenburg, Queen of Denmark.

On 4 October 1478 Christian I of Denmark issued a royal decree by which he officially established the University of Copenhagen. In this decree, Christian I set down the rules and laws governing the university. The royal decree elected magistar Peder Albertsen as vice chancellor of the university, and the task was his to employ various learned scholars at the new university and thereby establish its first four faculties: theology, law, medicine and philosophy. The royal decree made the University of Copenhagen enjoy royal patronage from its very beginning. Furthermore, the university was explicitly established as an autonomous institution, giving it a great degree of juridical freedom. As such, the University of Copenhagen was to be administered without royal interference, and it was not subject to the usual laws governing the Danish people.

The University of Copenhagen was dissolved in about 1531 as a result of the spread of Protestantism. It was re-established in 1537 by King Christian III after the Lutheran Reformation. The king charged Johannes Bugenhagen, who came from Wittenberg to Copenhagen to take up a chair of theology, with the drawing up of a new University Charter. The resulting Charter was issued in 1539. Between 1675 and 1788, the university introduced the concept of degree examinations. An examination for theology was added in 1675, followed by law in 1736. By 1788, all faculties required an examination before they would issue a degree.

In 1807, most of the university's buildings were heavily damaged during the British bombardment of Copenhagen. By 1836, however, the new main building of the university was inaugurated amid extensive building that continued until the end of the century. The University Library (now a part of the Royal Library), the Zoological Museum, the Geological Museum, the Botanic Garden with greenhouses, and the Technical College were also established during this period.

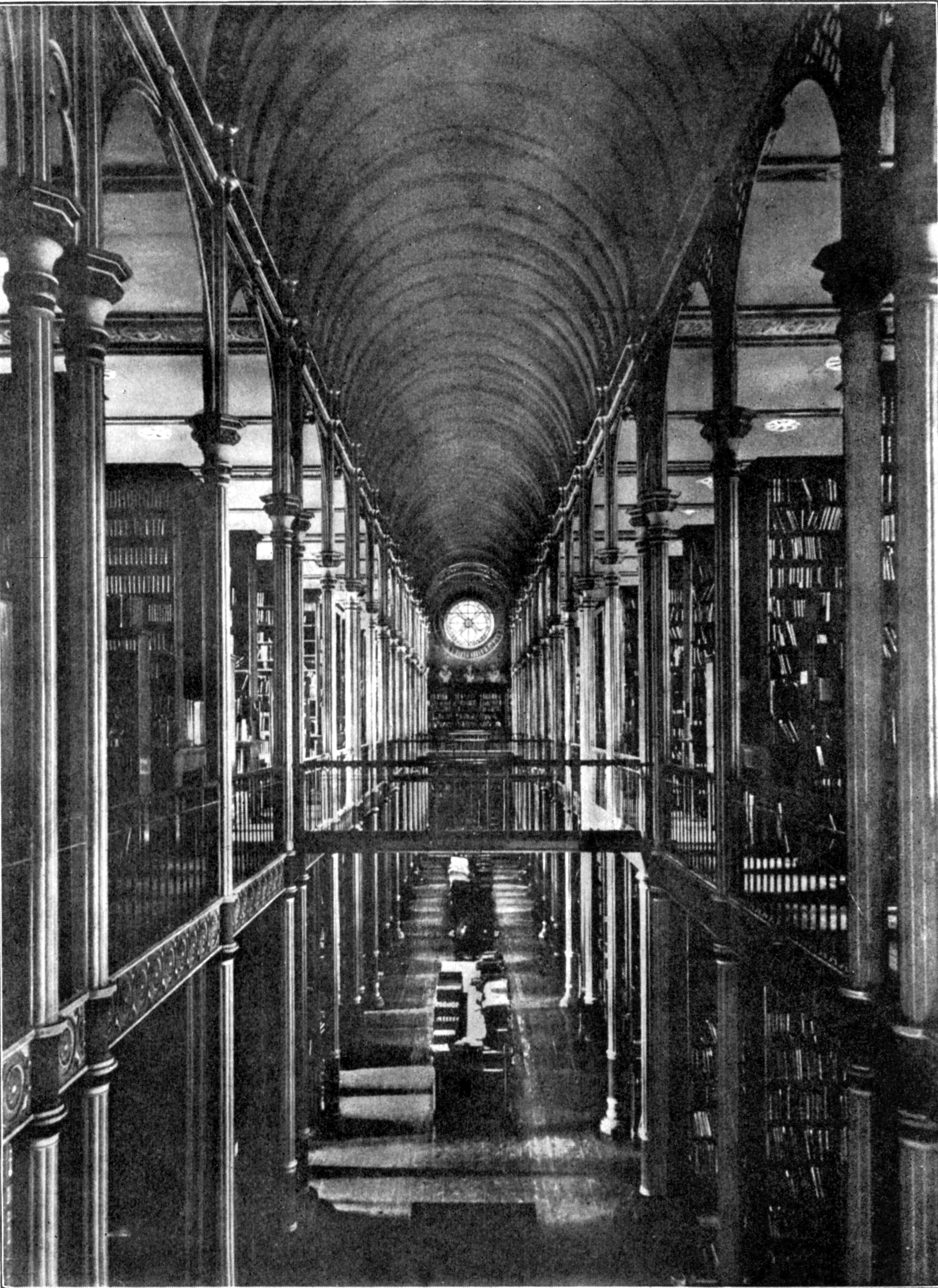
Interior of the old university library at Fiolstræde around 1920

Between 1842 and 1850, the faculties at the university were restructured. Starting in 1842, the University Faculty of Medicine and the Academy of Surgeons merged to form the Faculty of Medical Science, while in 1848 the Faculty of Law was reorganised and became the Faculty of Jurisprudence and Political Science. In 1850, the Faculty of Mathematics and Science was separated from the Faculty of Philosophy. In 1845 and 1862 Copenhagen co-hosted Nordic student meetings with Lund University.

The first female students, Nielsine Nielsen and Johanne Marie Gleerup were enrolled at the University on the medical programme. The university underwent explosive growth between 1960 and 1980. The number of students rose from around 6,000 in 1960 to about 26,000 in 1980, with a correspondingly large growth in the number of employees. Buildings built during this time period include the new Zoological Museum, the Hans Christian Ørsted and August Krogh Institutes, the campus centre on Amager Island, and the Panum Institute.

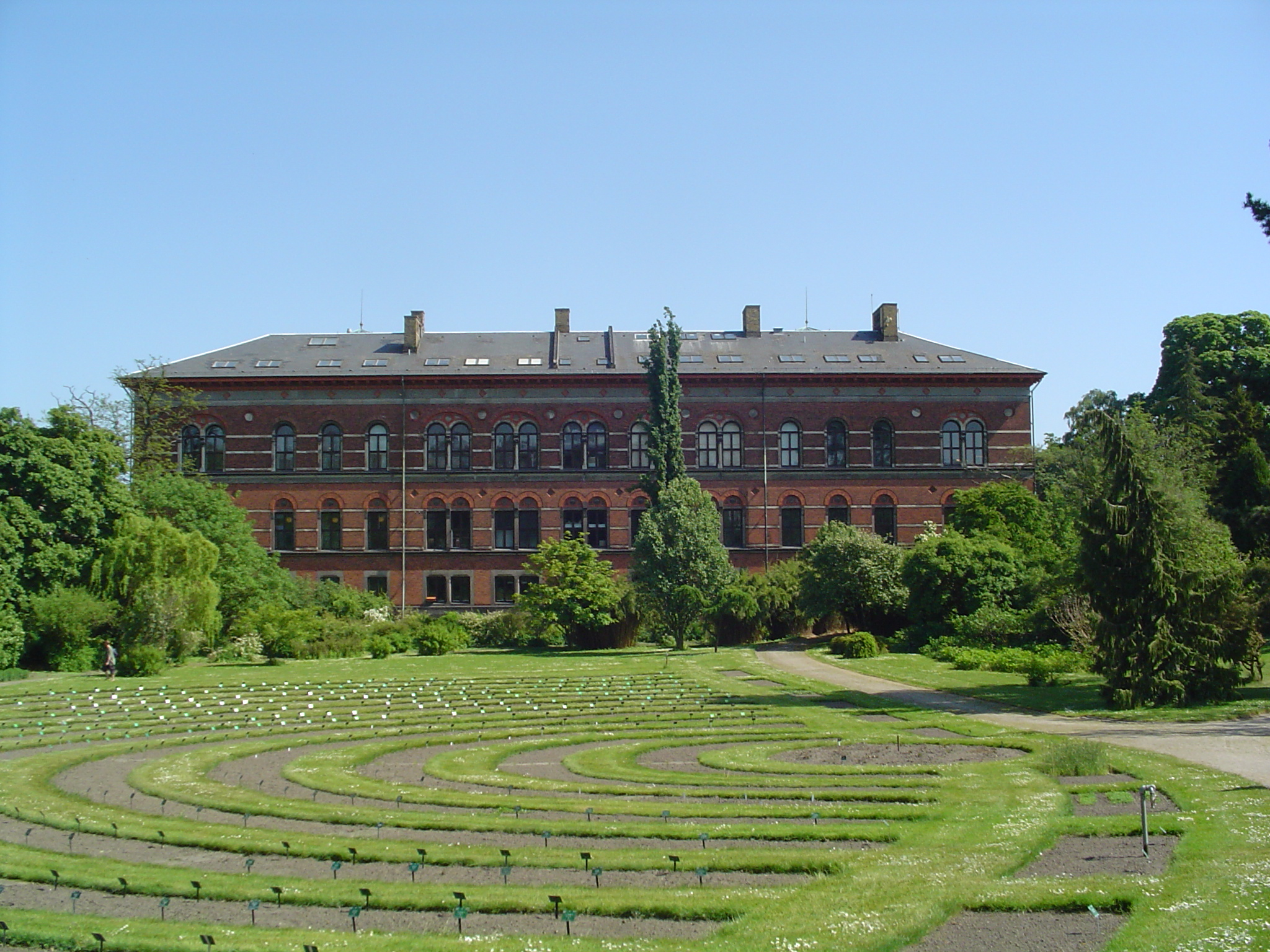
The Geological Museum, now part of the Natural History Museum of Denmark

The new university statute instituted in 1970 involved democratisation of the management of the university. It was modified in 1973 and subsequently applied to all higher education institutions in Denmark. The democratisation was later reversed with the 2003 university reforms. Further change in the structure of the university from 1990 to 1993 made a Bachelor's degree programme mandatory in virtually all subjects.

Also in 1993, the law departments broke off from the Faculty of Social Sciences to form a separate Faculty of Law. In 1994, the University of Copenhagen designated environmental studies, north–south relations, and biotechnology as areas of special priority according to its new long-term plan. Starting in 1996 and continuing to the present, the university planned new buildings, including for the University of Copenhagen Faculty of Humanities at Amager (Ørestaden), along with a Biotechnology Centre. By 1999, the student population had grown to exceed 35,000, resulting in the university appointing additional professors and other personnel.

Nielsine Nielsen was one of the first two female students at the university.

In 2003, the revised Danish university law removed faculty, staff and students from the university decision process, creating a top-down control structure that has been described as absolute monarchy, since leaders are granted extensive powers while being appointed exclusively by higher levels in the organization.

In 2005, the Center for Health and Society (Center for Sundhed og Samfund – CSS) opened in central Copenhagen, housing the Faculty of Social Sciences and Institute of Public Health, which until then had been located in various places throughout the city. In May 2006, the university announced further plans to leave many of its old buildings in the inner city of Copenhagen, an area that has been home to the university for more than 500 years. The purpose of this has been to gather the university's many departments and faculties on three larger campuses in order to create a bigger, more concentrated and modern student environment with better teaching facilities, as well as to save money on rent and maintenance of the old buildings. The concentration of facilities on larger campuses also allows for more inter-disciplinary cooperation; for example, the Departments of Political Science and Sociology are now located in the same facilities at CSS and can pool resources more easily.

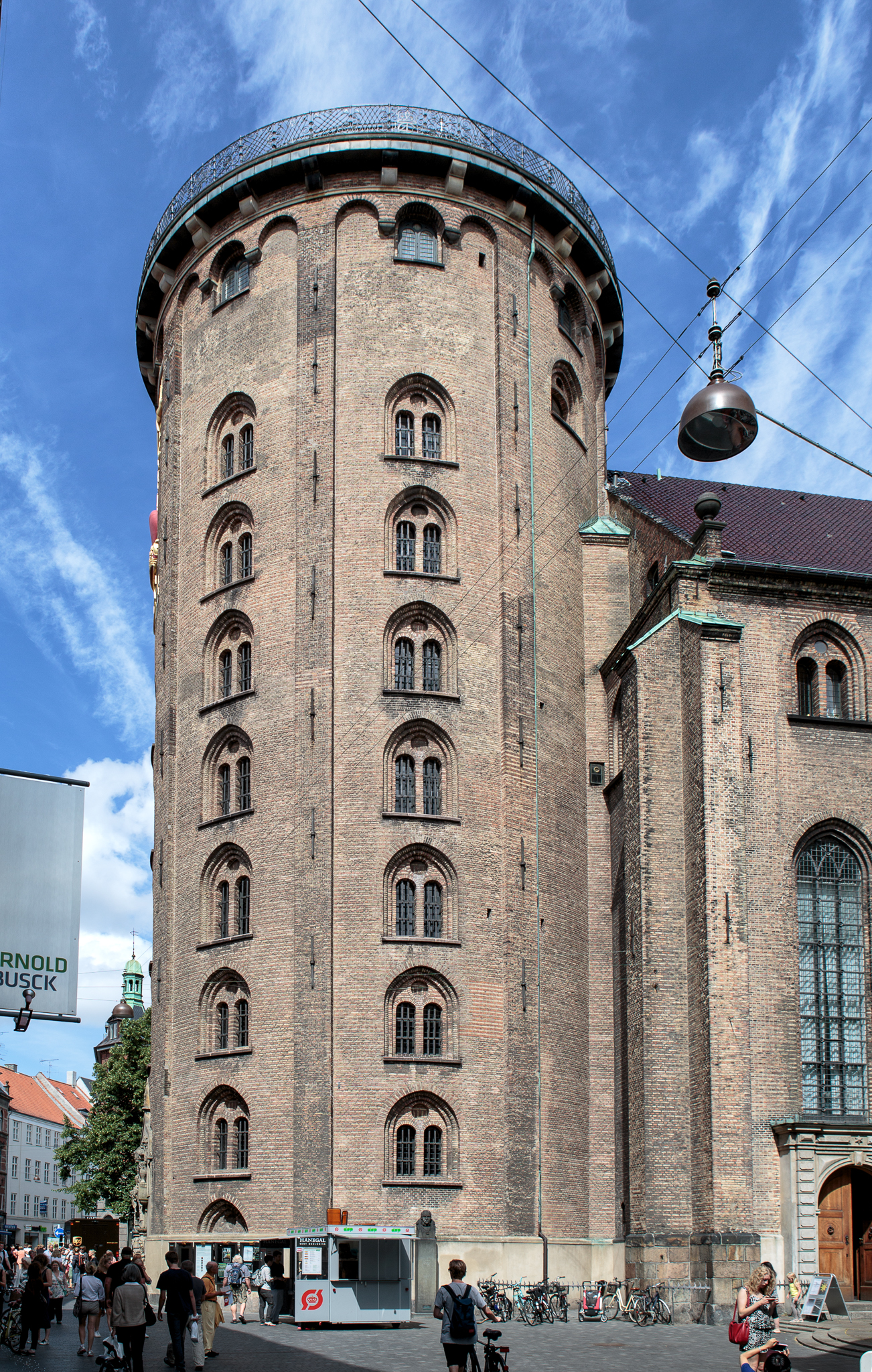
The Round Tower (Rundetårn), used as an observatory by astronomer Ole Rømer

In January 2007, the University of Copenhagen merged with the Royal Veterinary and Agricultural University and the Danish University of Pharmaceutical Science. The two universities were converted into faculties under the University of Copenhagen, and were renamed as the Faculty of Life Sciences and the Faculty of Pharmaceutical Sciences. In January 2012, the Faculty of Pharmaceutical Sciences and the veterinary third of the Faculty of Life Sciences merged with the Faculty of Health Sciences forming the Faculty of Health and Medical Sciences – and the other two thirds of the Faculty of Life Sciences were merged into the Faculty of Science.

== Campuses ==
The university has four main campus areas that are located in the Capital Region (three in Copenhagen and one in Frederiksberg):

- North Campus – home to most of the Faculty of Science and the Faculty of Health and Medical Sciences.
- City Campus – home to the Faculty of Social Sciences and Central Administration as well as parts of the Faculty of Health and Medical Sciences and the Faculty of Science.
- South Campus – houses the Faculty of Humanities, the Faculty of Law, the Faculty of Theology, and a small proportion of the Faculty of Science.
- Frederiksberg Campus – home to sections of the Faculty of Science and the Faculty of Health and Medical Sciences.

The Faculty of Health and Medical Sciences and the Faculty of Science also use the Taastrup Campus, which is located in Taastrup on the western outskirts of Copenhagen. The Faculty of Science also has facilities in Helsingør, Hørsholm and Nødebo.

== Organisation and administration ==
The university is governed by a board consisting of 11 members: 6 members recruited outside the university form the majority of the board, 2 members are appointed by the scientific staff, 1 member is appointed by the administrative staff, and 2 members are appointed by the university students. The rector, the prorector and the director of the university are appointed by the university board. The rector in turn appoints directors of the different parts of the central administration and deans of the different faculties. The deans appoint heads of 50 departments. There is no faculty senate and faculty is not involved in the appointment of rector, deans, or department heads. Hence the university has no faculty governance, although there are elected Academic Boards at faculty level who advise the deans. As of 2018, the governing body manages an annual budget of about DKK 8.9 billion.

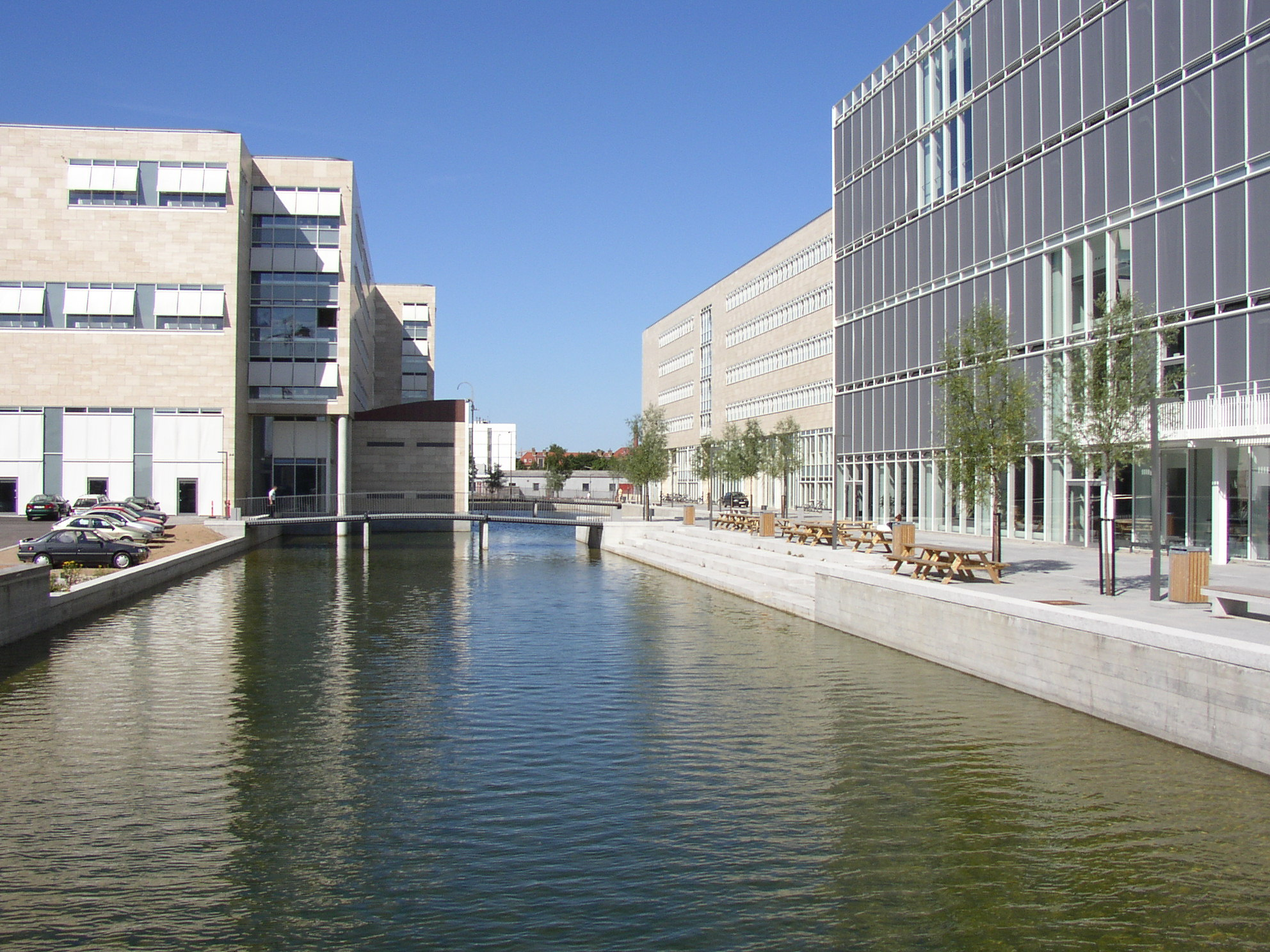
South Campus

The university is organized into six faculties and about 100 departments and research centres. The university employs about 5,600 academic staff and 4,400 technical and administrative staff. The six faculties are:

- Faculty of Health and Medical Sciences
- Faculty of Humanities
- Faculty of Law
- Faculty of Science
- Faculty of Social Sciences
- Faculty of Theology

The total number of enrolled students is about 36,500, including about 21,000 undergraduate students and 15,500 graduate students as of 2024. The university has an international graduate talent programme which provides grants for international Ph.D., students and a tenure track carrier system. It operates about fifty master's programmes taught in English, and has arranged about 150 exchange agreements with other institutions and 800 Erasmus agreements. Each year there are about 1,700 incoming exchange students, 2,000 outbound exchange students and 4,000 international degree-seeking students. About 3,000 PhD students study there each year.

== University housing ==
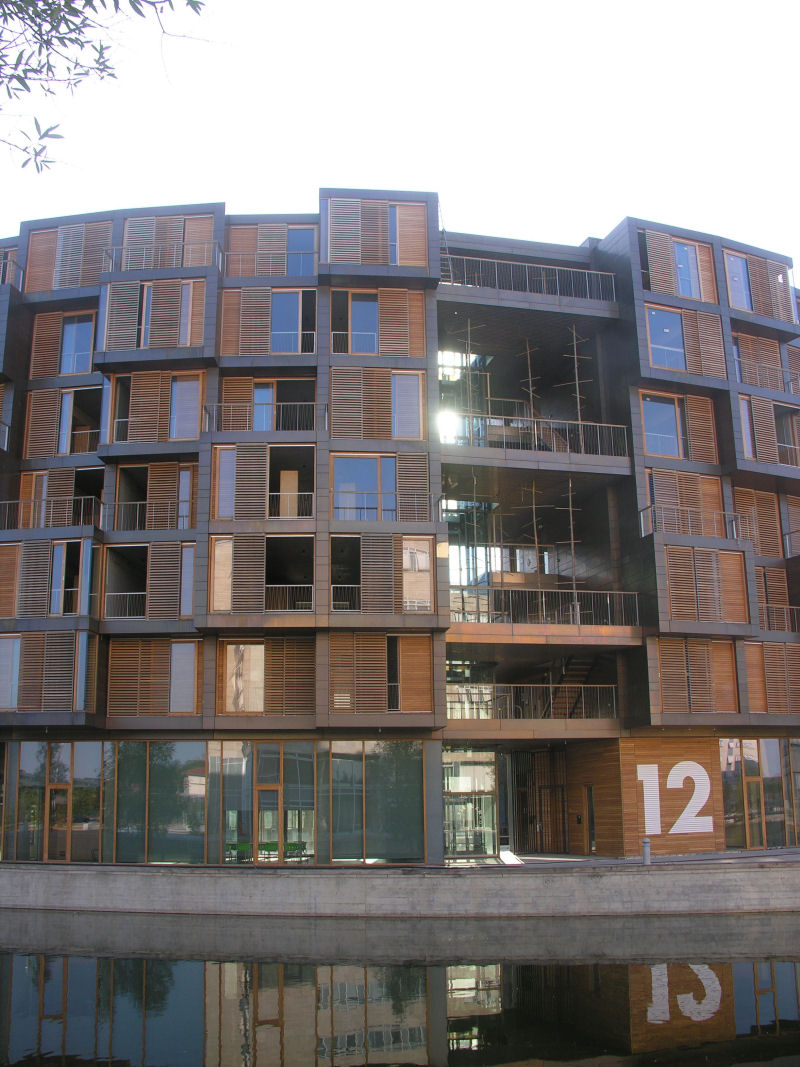
Tietgenkollegiet

Most university students stay in privately owned dormitories (kollegier in Danish) or apartments in Copenhagen. There are five dormitories that are partially administered by the university; however, only students who have passed at least two years of studies are considered for admission. These are normally referred to as the old dormitories, and they consist of: Regensen, Elers' Kollegium, Borchs Kollegium, Hassagers Kollegium, and Valkendorfs Kollegium. The University of Copenhagen also offers Carlsberg Foundation researcher apartments for a duration of 6 months to 3 years for visiting research and academic research staff who affiliated with research projects funded by the Carlsberg Foundation.

The Housing Foundation Copenhagen is a separate commercial entity to the University of Copenhagen run by Chairman Erik Bisgaard Madsen and a board of directors. The Housing Foundation Copenhagen provides short-term housing exclusively for university international students ( sometimes Danish students), university staff and guest researchers. Their central office is based at South Campus. The Housing Foundation Copenhagen has received considerable criticism for the exploitation of international students for business profits and poor living conditions, and most recently the refusal of shortening contracts for many international students affected by the COVID-19 pandemic.

== Seal ==
The university's oldest known seal dates from a 1531 letter, it depicts Saint Peter with a key and a book. In a circle around him is the text

| Sigillum universitatis studii haffnensis. |

When the university was re-established by Christian III in 1537 after the Protestant Reformation, it received a new seal, showing king Christian III with crown, sceptre, and globus cruciger above a crowned coat of arms vertically divided between halved versions of the coat of arms of Denmark (to the viewer's left, dexter) and the coat of arms of Norway (to the viever's right, sinister). The text is

| Sigillum Universitatis Hafniensis A Christiano III Rege Restauravit | (i.e. Seal of the University of Copenhagen, reestablished by King Christian III). |

The 1537 seal is very similar to the current seal, which was made in 2000 and is shown at the top of this page. The text is different and the crowned shield shows the coat of arms of Denmark (as has been the case since 1820, when the heraldic reference to Norway was removed). The text is

| Sigillum Universitatis Hafniensis Fundatæ 1479 Reformatæ 1537 | Seal of the University of Copenhagen Founded 1479 Reformed 1537 |

In addition to the university seal, each of the university's six faculties carry seals of their own.

The seal of 1531 (left) and the seal of 1537 (right)

== International reputation ==
University rankings

Global – Overall
- ARWU World: 32 (2024)
- CWUR World: 38 (2024)
- CWTS World: 35 (2024)
- QS World: 100 (2025)
- THE World: 97 (2025)
- USNWR Global: 44 (tie) (2024–2025)

The 2021 CWTS Leiden Ranking ranked the University of Copenhagen as the best university in Denmark and best in Continental Europe, fourth in Europe (after Oxford, UCL and Cambridge) and 27th in the world.

The 2021 Academic Ranking of World Universities published by Shanghai Jiao Tong University ranked the University of Copenhagen as the best university in Denmark and Scandinavia, 7th in Europe and 30th in the world. In the Times Higher Education World University Rankings for 2021, the University of Copenhagen was ranked first in Denmark and 84th in the world. In the 2021 QS World University Rankings list, the University of Copenhagen was ranked first in Denmark and 76th in the world. In the 2021 U.S. News & World Report's Best Global Universities Rankings list, the University of Copenhagen was ranked first in Denmark and 34th in the world.

== Cooperative agreements with other universities ==
The university cooperates with universities around the world. In January 2006, the University of Copenhagen entered into a partnership of ten top universities, along with the: Australian National University, ETH Zürich, National University of Singapore, Peking University, University of California, University of Cambridge, University of Oxford, University of Tokyo and Yale University. The partnership is referred to as the International Alliance of Research Universities (IARU).

The Department of Scandinavian Studies and Linguistics at University of Copenhagen signed a cooperation agreement with the Danish Royal School of Library and Information Science in 2009.

The university hosts the annual Aging Research and Drug Discovery conference in cooperation with Columbia University.

The University of Copenhagen is an active member of the University of the Arctic. UArctic is an international cooperative network based in the Circumpolar Arctic region, consisting of more than 200 universities, colleges, and other organizations with an interest in promoting education and research in the Arctic region.

== List of rectors ==
Henrik Caspar Wegener (2017–present). He is the 259th rector.

== Notable alumni ==
Over the course of its history, a sizeable number of University of Copenhagen alumni have become notable in their fields, both academic, and in the wider world.

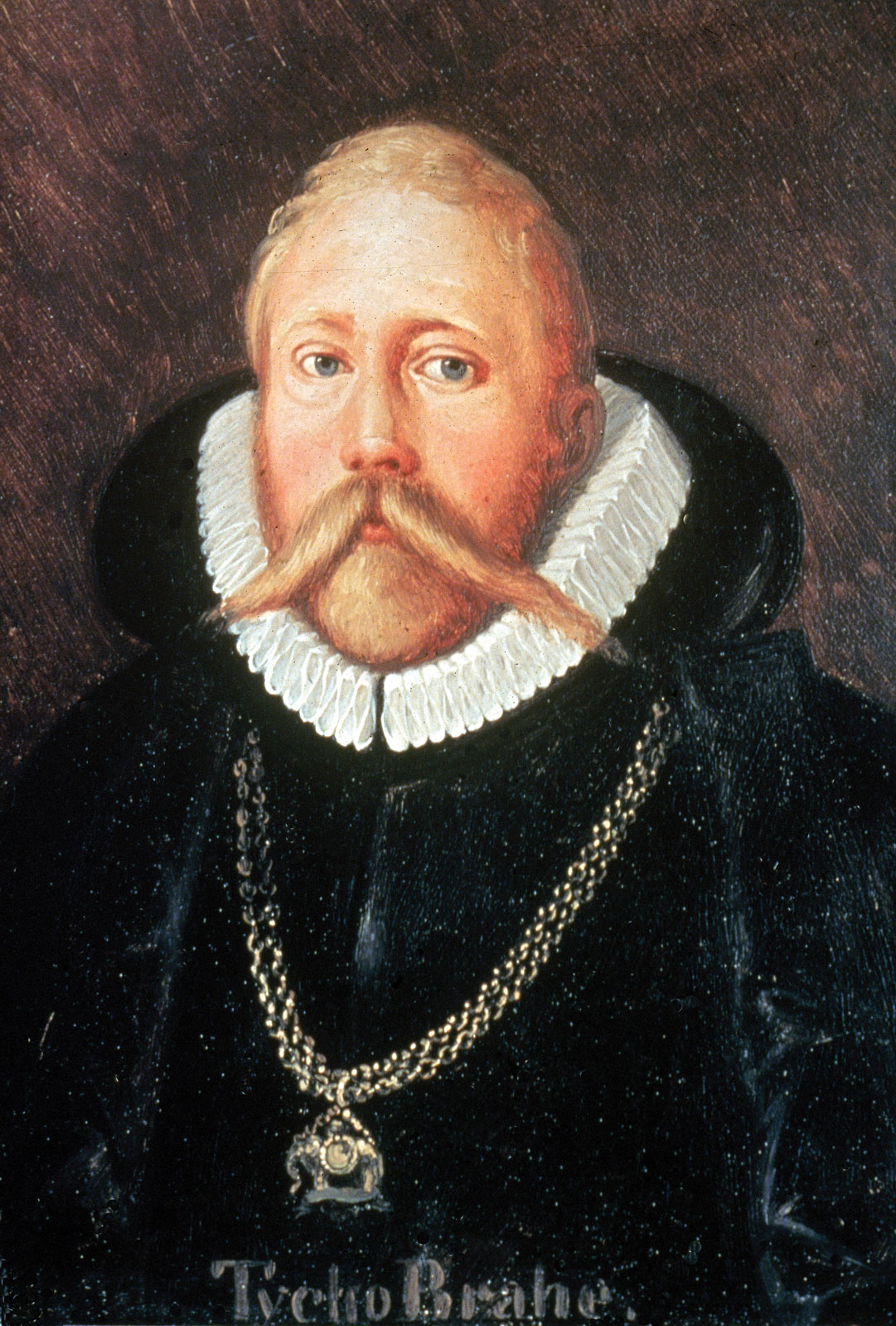
Tycho Brahe

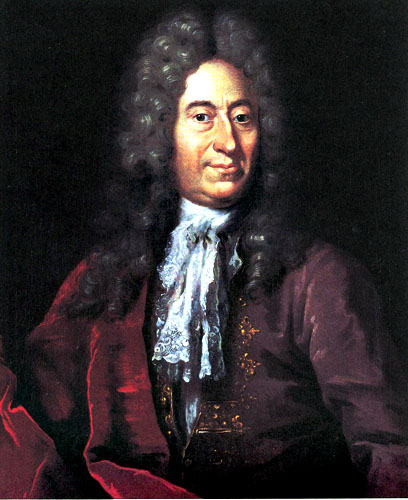
Ole Rømer

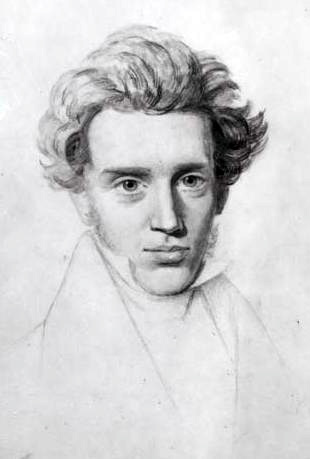
Søren Kierkegaard

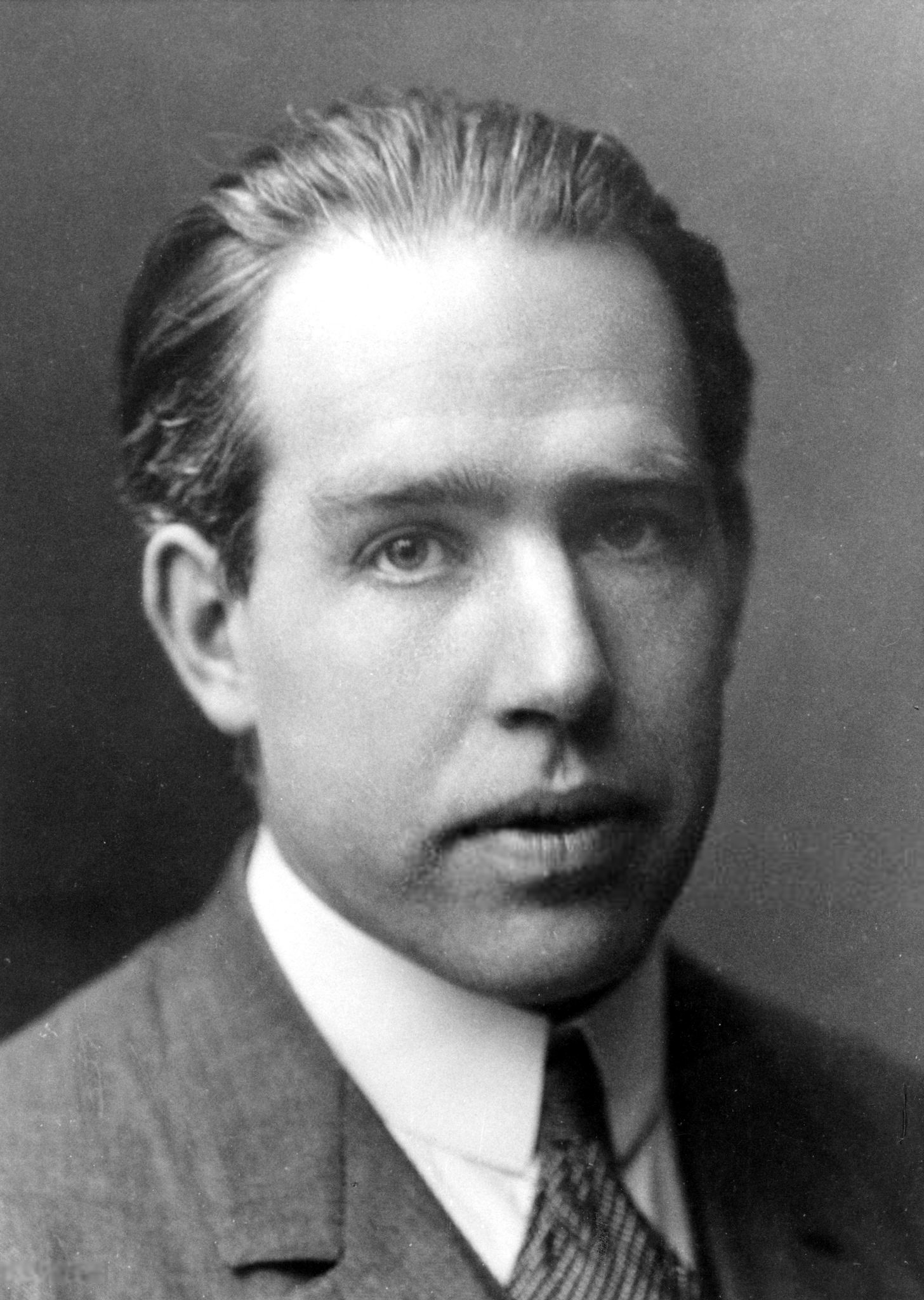
Niels Bohr

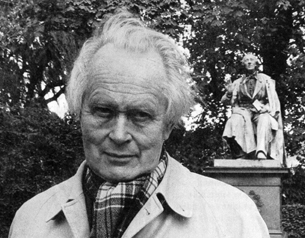
Piet Hein

- Tycho Brahe (1546–1601), Danish astronomer, first scientific documentation of supernovas, mentor of Johannes Kepler
- Thomas Fincke (1561–1656), Danish mathematician and physicist
- Caspar Bartholin (1585–1629), professor in medicine and theology. Author of textbooks on anatomy and the discoverer of the workings of the olfactory nerve.
- Olaus Wormius (1588–1655), Danish physician and antiquarian
- Thomas Bartholin (1616–1680), discoverer of the lymphatic system
- Rasmus Bartholin (1625–1698), professor in geometry and medicine. He discovered birefringence, but was unable to give a scientific explanation.
- Thomas Hansen Kingo (1634–1703), Danish bishop and poet
- Nicholas Steno (1638–1696), a pioneer in anatomy and geology
- Ole Rømer (1644–1710), Danish astronomer. He made the first quantitative measurements of the speed of light.
- Peder Horrebow (1679–1764), Danish astronomer and member of Académie des Sciences
- Ludvig Holberg (1684–1754), Danish-Norwegian writer and playwright
- Christian Jacob Protten (1715–1769), Euro-African Moravian missionary pioneer, linguist, translator and educationalist-administrator
- Morten Thrane Brunnich (1737–1827), Danish zoologist
- Caspar Wessel (1745–1818), mathematician
- Martin Vahl (1749–1804), Danish-Norwegian botanist and zoologist
- Hans Christian Ørsted (1777–1851), Danish physicist and chemist. He discovered electromagnetism.
- Anders Sandøe Ørsted (1778–1860), Danish lawyer and prime minister of Denmark (1853–1854)
- Adam Gottlob Oehlenschläger (1779–1850), poet, author of lyrics of the Danish national anthem Der er et yndigt land
- N. F. S. Grundtvig (1783–1872), Danish writer, poet, philosopher and priest
- Christopher Hansteen (1784–1873), Norwegian astronomer and physicist
- Johan Ludvig Heiberg (1791–1860), Danish poet and critic
- Magnús Eiríksson (1806–1881), Icelandic theologian
- Søren Kierkegaard (1813–1855), Danish theologian and philosopher, the father of existentialism
- Anders Sandøe Ørsted (1816–1872), professor of botany (1851–1862)
- Hinrich Johannes Rink (1819–1893), Danish geologist, and founder of the first Greenlandic language newspaper
- Peter Ludvig Panum (1820–1885), Danish physiologist and pathologist; the Panum Building in Copenhagen is named in his honor.
- Hans Schjellerup (1827–1887), Danish astronomer
- Carl Lange (1834–1900), Danish physician
- Thorvald N. Thiele (1838–1910), Danish astronomer, actuary and mathematician
- Julius Petersen (1839–1910), Danish mathematician
- Eugenius Warming (1841–1924), Danish botanist and founding figure of ecology
- Georg Brandes (1842–1927), Danish writer and critic
- Vilhelm Thomsen (1842–1927), Danish linguist
- Harald Høffding (1843–1931), Danish philosopher, theologian and psychologist
- Herman Trier (1845–1925), Danish educator and politician
- Hans Christian Gram (1853–1938), Danish bacteriologist, inventor of Gram staining
- Christian Bohr (1855–1911), Danish physician, who described Bohr effect
- Wilhelm Johannsen (1857–1927), Danish botanist. He first coined the word gene in its modern usage.
- Niels Ryberg Finsen (1860–1904), Nobel laureate in medicine (1903)
- Otto Jespersen (1860–1943), Danish linguist, co-founder of the International Phonetic Association
- Kirstine Meyer (1861–1941), Danish physicist
- Hannes Hafstein (1861–1922), Icelandic politician and poet
- Johannes Andreas Grib Fibiger (1867–1928), Nobel laureate in medicine (1926)
- Holger Pedersen (1867–1953), Danish linguist
- Ove Jørgensen (1877–1950), Danish Homeric scholar and ballet critic
- Agner Krarup Erlang (1878–1929), creator of the field of telephone networks analysis
- S. P. L. Sørensen (1868–1939), Danish chemist, who introduced the concept of pH
- Martin Knudsen (1871–1949), Danish physicist
- August Krogh (1874–1949), Nobel laureate in medicine (1920)
- Holger Scheuermann (1877–1960), Danish surgeon after whom Scheuermann's disease is named
- Kirstine Smith (1878–1939), Danish statistician credited with creation of optimal design of experiments
- Benjamin Christensen (1879–1959), Danish film director, screenwriter and actor
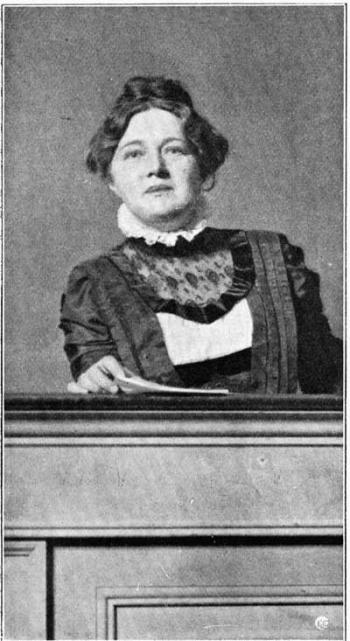
- Ingeborg Hammer-Jensen
  Ingeborg Hammer-Jensen (1880–1955), classical scholar and philologist
- Niels Bohr (1885–1962). He contributed to development of the atomic model and quantum mechanics. Director at the university's Institute of Theoretical Physics. Nobel laureate in physics (1922).
- Øjvind Winge (1886–1964), Danish biologist
- Harald Bohr (1887–1951), Danish Olympic silver medalist football player and mathematician; brother of Niels Bohr
- Inge Lehmann (1888–1993), Danish seismologist discovering the Earth's inner core
- Jakob Nielsen (1890–1959), Danish mathematician
- Julie Vinter Hansen (1890–1960), Danish astronomer
- Carl Vaernet (1893–1965), Danish medical doctor
- Oskar Klein (1894–1977), Swedish theoretical physicist
- Henrik Dam (1895–1976), Nobel laureate in medicine (1943)
- Sir Ove Arup (1896–1988), Anglo-Danish structural engineer
- Frederik IX (1899–1972), King of Denmark from 1947 to 1972
- Alf Ross (1899–1979), Danish legal philosopher
- Louis Hjelmslev (1899–1965), Danish linguist, founder of Copenhagen School
- Anton Frederik Bruun (1901–1961), Danish oceanographer
- Georg Rasch (1901–1980), Danish mathematician, statistician and psychometrician
- Knud Ejler Løgstrup (1905–1981), Danish philosopher and theologian. Pastor at Sandager-Holevad 1936–1943. Professor at University of Aarhus 1943–1975.
- Piet Hein (1905–1996), Danish mathematician, inventor and poet
- Bengt Strömgren (1908–1987), Danish astronomer and astrophysicist
- Hilde Levi (1909–2003), German-Danish physicist
- Niels Kaj Jerne (1911–1994), Nobel laureate in medicine (1984)
- Preben von Magnus (1912–1973), Danish virologist, who gave name to the Von Magnus phenomenon
- Jens Otto Krag (1914–1978), prime minister of Denmark (1962–1968, 1971–1972)
- Poul Hartling (1914–2000), prime minister of Denmark (1973–1975) and United Nations High Commissioner for Refugees (1978–1985), Nobel Peace Prize laureate on behalf of UNHCR (1981)
- Bjørn Aage Ibsen (1915–2007), Anesthetist and founder of intensive-care medicine
- Poul Bjørndahl Astrup (1915–2000), Danish clinical chemist, inventor of blood gas analyzer
- Jens Christian Skou (born 1918), Nobel laureate in chemistry (1997) for his discovery of Na+,K+-ATPase
- Hans H. Ørberg (1920–2010), linguist and scholar
- Aage Bohr (1922–2009), professor in nuclear physics and director of the Niels Bohr Institute at the university. Nobel laureate in physics (1975).
- Halfdan T. Mahler (1923–2016), Director-General of World Health Organization (1973–1988)
- Ólafía Einarsdóttir (1924–2017), first person from Iceland to earn a degree in archaeology
- Ben Roy Mottelson (1926–2022), American-born Danish nuclear physicist, Nobel laureate in physics (1975)
- Peter Naur (1928–2016), computer scientist, Turing Award in 2005
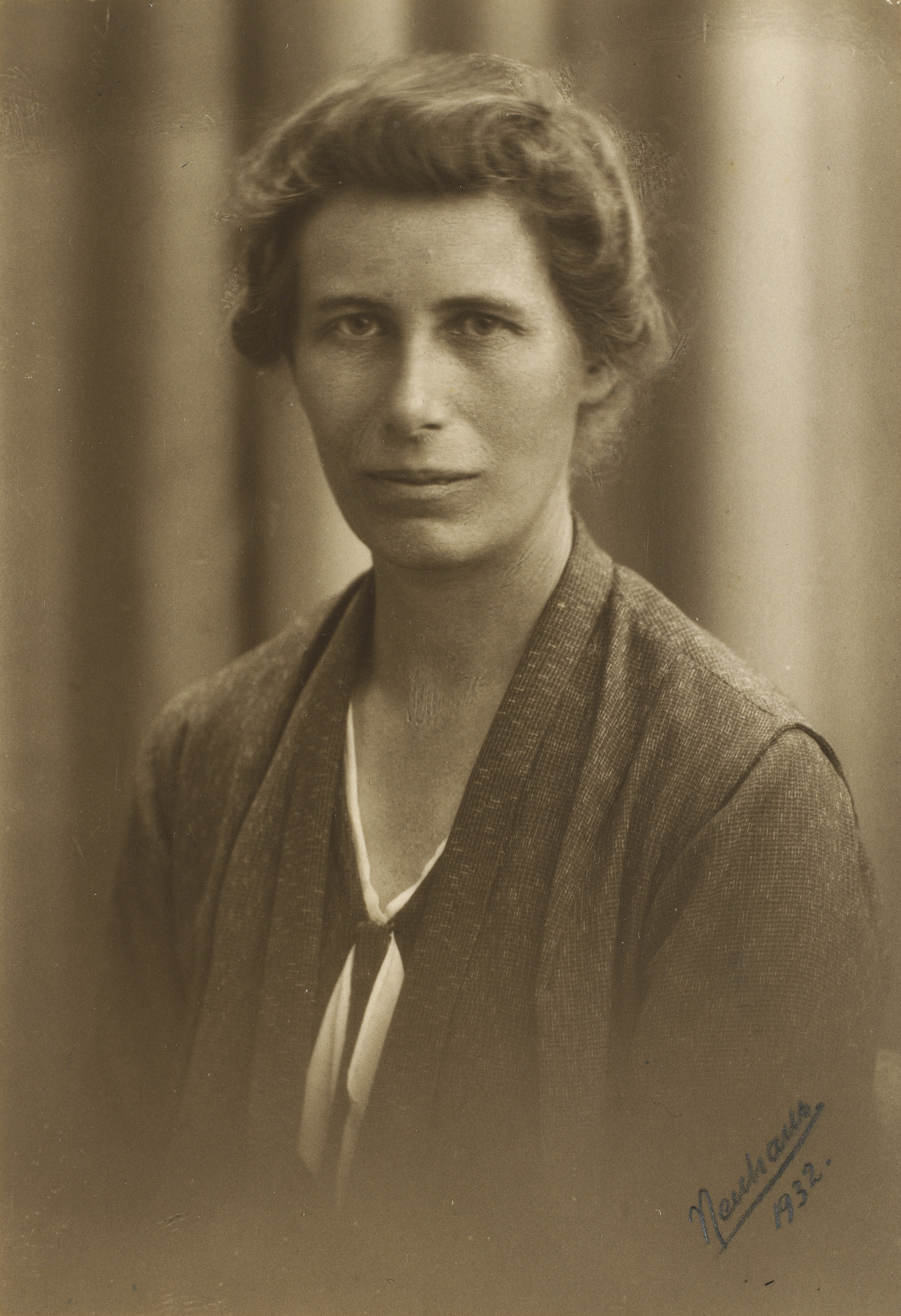
- Inge Lehmann
  Poul Schlüter (1929–2021), prime minister of Denmark (1982–1993)
- Vigdís Finnbogadóttir (born 1930), the 4th President of Iceland (1980–1996)
- Ozer Schild (1930–2006), Danish-born Israeli academic, president of the University of Haifa and president of the College of Judea and Samaria ("Ariel College")
- Jørgen Rischel (1934–2007), Danish linguist, who analyzed Greenlandic and Mon-Khmer languages
- Per Kirkeby (1938–2018), Danish painter and sculptor
- Per Pinstrup-Andersen (1939), Danish economist, 2001 World Food Prize laureate
- Søren Johansen (1939), Danish econometrician
- Lasse Hessel (1940–2019), inventor of female condom
- Anders Boserup (1940–1990), co-founder of the Danish Institute for Peace and Conflict Research and the Nordic Peace Foundation
- Aage B. Sørensen (1941–2001), Danish sociologist
- Holger Bech Nielsen (1941), Danish physicist, one of three creators of string theory
- Jørgen Haugan (1941), Doctorate in Philosophy (1977); Norwegian author and lecturer
- Poul Nyrup Rasmussen (1943), prime minister of Denmark (1993–2001)
- Sine Larsen (1943–2025), chemist and crystallographer
- Claus Bjørn (1944–2005), author, historian and broadcaster
- Litten Hansen (1944), former actress, activist and politician
- Niels Peter Lemche (1945), biblical scholar, founder of Copenhagen School
- Mette Frederiksen, Master in African Studies, 2009
  Mogens Lykketoft (1946), Danish politician, the 70th President of the United Nations General Assembly (2015–2016)
- Halldór Ásgrímsson (1947–2015), prime minister of Iceland (2004–2006)
- Ole Humlum (1949), Danish geologist and professor emeritus at the University of Oslo
- Uffe Haagerup (1949–2015), Danish mathematician
- Anders Fogh Rasmussen (1953), prime minister of Denmark (2001–2009), secretary general of NATO (2009–2014)
- Morten Meldal (1954), Nobel laureate in chemistry (2022) for his invention of Click chemistry
- Jesper Nygart (1956), Danish physician
- Peter Høeg (1957), Danish fiction writer. He won international acclaim with Smilla's Sense of Snow.
- Morten Frost (1958), Danish world-class badminton player and coach
- Mads Tofte (1959), computer scientist, vice chancellor of IT University of Copenhagen
- Ole Wæver (1960), scholar of International Relations, one of exponents of Copenhagen School
- Steve Scully (1960), American host, senior producer, and political editor of the C-SPAN network's Washington Journal. He studied at the University of Copenhagen as part of his master's program at Northwestern University in Evanston, Illinois.
- Corinna Cortes (1961), computer scientist
- Lars Løkke Rasmussen (1964), prime minister of Denmark (2009–2011, 2015–2019)
- Lars Mikkelsen (1964), Danish actor
- Arne Astrup (1955), nutritionist and professor
- Bjørn Lomborg (1965), Danish economist, author of The Skeptical Environmentalist
- Helle Thorning-Schmidt (1966), prime minister of Denmark (2011–2015)
- Marie-Louise Nosch (1970), archaeologist; Professor in the university's Saxo Institute
- Eskild Ebbesen (1972), Danish world-class lightweight rower
- Mette Frederiksen (1977), prime minister of Denmark (2019–present)
- Jennifer Kewley Draskau (died 2024), Manx historian, linguist, teacher and political candidate

== See also ==
- Copenhagen School
- Copenhagen (play)
- The University of Copenhagen Symphony Orchestra
- List of Nobel laureates associated with the University of Copenhagen
- List of universities and colleges in Denmark
- List of medieval universities
- Open access in Denmark
