= Sune =

Sune may refer to:

- Sune (book series), a Swedish children's book series
- Sune (Forgotten Realms), a fictional deity in Forgotten Realms
- Sune (name), a given name
- Lalah Sune, a fictional character in Mobile Suit Gundam

== See also ==
- Soon (disambiguation)
- Sun (disambiguation)
