= Christoph Mügge =

German-Swedish contemporary artist (born 1983)

- Born: Christoph Mügge; 1983 (age 42–43); Bonn, Germany
- Citizenship: German, Swedish
- Education: Kunstakademie Düsseldorf
- Known for: Site-specific installations, use of found materials
- Movement: Contemporary art, Installation art
- Website: www.christophmuegge.com

Christoph Mügge (born 1983 in Bonn, Germany) is a German-Swedish contemporary artist based in Malmö, Sweden. He studied at the Kunstakademie Düsseldorf, graduating in 2013. Mügge primarily develops large-scale, site-specific projects that combine found materials with techniques including installation, sculpture, drawing, and assemblage. His work examines themes such as the impact of conflict on everyday life, the physical and digital traces humans leave behind, narrative construction, and the interpretation of historical events.

== Life and education ==
Mügge was born in 1983 in Bonn, Germany. He studied under British sculptor Richard Deacon at the Kunstakademie Düsseldorf and received his diploma (Akademiebrief) in 2013. He currently lives and works in Malmö, Sweden.

== Artistic practice ==
Mügge’s work engages with found and everyday materials, particularly in his site-specific projects. He utilizes a range of techniques, including installation, sculpture, works on paper, and assemblage, exploring themes of memory, transience, and the reconfiguration of material culture. Since 2017, Christoph has worked collaboratively with his brother, Sebastian Mügge (born 1981 in Bonn). Their joint practice transforms archival material and everyday items into immersive installations. Their collaboration began with the exhibition Det stora soprumsnöjet at Kristianstads konsthall.

== Solo exhibitions ==
- 2025 – If the Spirits Come, HORANGGASY Creative Studio, Gwangju, South Korea.
- 2016 – See It Again Here!, Bolivar Art Gallery, University of Kentucky, Lexington, United States.
- 2014 – malaria – zeitnot – hauerei – insalivation, Kunstverein Bochumer Kulturrat, Bochum, Germany.

== Duo exhibitions (with Sebastian Mügge) ==
- 2025 – Traumatic Trash Pizza, Spazio Contemporanea, Brescia, Italy.
- 2024 – Lost Library Legends, Rundetårn, Copenhagen, Denmark.
- 2024 – Circular Faroe Tales, The Nordic House, Tórshavn, Faroe Islands.
- 2021 – Depot oder Deponie, DG Kunstraum, Munich, Germany.
- 2019 – Do With Less – So They’ll Have Enough!, The Koppel Project Hive, London, United Kingdom.
- 2018 – Viktigt meddelande till allmänheten, Södertälje konsthall, Södertälje, Sweden.
- 2017 – Det stora soprumsnöjet, Kristianstads konsthall, Kristianstad, Sweden.

== Group exhibitions and biennials ==
- 2025 – Shame of the Shuffled Cards, Kunstfort Vijfhuizen, Vijfhuizen, Netherlands.
- 2025 – Rauma Triennale, Finland.
- 2022 – Der Bau. Hommage an Kafka, Museum Villa Rot, Burgrieden, Germany.
- 2021 – Ostrale Biennale, Dresden, Germany.
- 2020 – Entwürfnisse: Ring 8, Begehungen, Chemnitz, Germany.
- 2019 – Roja Art Lab, Roja, Latvia.
- 2014 – RAUM + OBJEKT XI – Raumstrategien, Kunstmuseum Gelsenkirchen, Gelsenkirchen, Germany.

== Grants and residencies ==
- 2024–2025 – Working Grant, Konstnärsnämnden (Swedish Arts Grants Committee).
- 2024 – Van Gogh Air Residency, Van Gogh Huis, Zundert, Netherlands.
- 2022 – Cité internationale des arts residency, awarded by the Royal Swedish Academy of Fine Arts, Paris, France.

== Public commissions ==
- 2024 – Sitting Standing Shielding Shouting, Kunstparcours Terra Incognita, Frankfurt, Germany.
