= Fort Vijfhuizen =

Fort in the Netherlands

Coordinates: 52°20′51″N 4°40′13″E

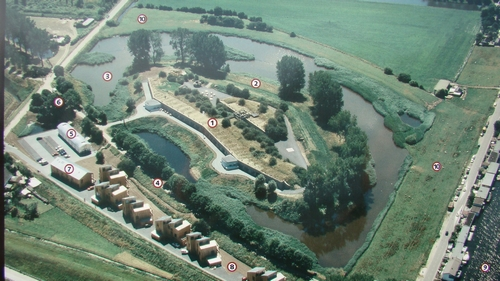
View of the fort from above, taken from the information board in front of the complex. The ringvaart is visible in the lower right-hand corner.

Fort Vijfhuizen is one of forty-two forts in the Defense Line of Amsterdam (Dutch: stelling van Amsterdam), a World Heritage Site. It is located in the town of Vijfhuizen on the ringvaart which surrounds the Haarlemmermeer polder. The main fort is currently maintained by a charitable foundation called Kunstfort Vijfhuizen which leases space for twelve artist studios and a restaurant. The fort is now a center for artistic experiment and a development site for scenarios for peaceful futures, focusing on the intersection of military heritage and ecology.

Kunstfort Vijfhuizen hosts a contemporary art program that utilizes the fort's distinctive historical and architectural setting. Exhibitions have included solo presentations such as Rachel de Joodes Flat Nature / Surface Bodies (2017) and Daan Roosegaardes temporary light monument Levenslicht (2020), as well as Folkert de Jongs theatrical show The Hero, the Villain, and the Truth (2024). The fort's programming also includes group shows that engage with key art historical figures, such as The Prophecy of Bees (2016), which featured Joseph Beuys among others in a reflection on ecological philosophy. The group show Shame of the Shuffled Cards (2025) presented the installation Elite Exodus by the Swedish-German brothers Christoph Mügge and Sebastian Mügge, a work about an elite survival bunker that critiques the ethics of privilege and protection.

The fort is situated on a hill surrounded by a moat and accessible during opening hours. It was built in 1889 and 1890 with sand taken from the excavations for a new sluice-gate complex in IJmuiden. On 3 May 1943 an American Ventura bomber crashed into the moat.

South of this fort, also along the ringvaart, is the first fore position of the fort, currently part of a golf course. A bit further south is yet another fore position at fort Cruquius, just south of the Cruquius Museum.

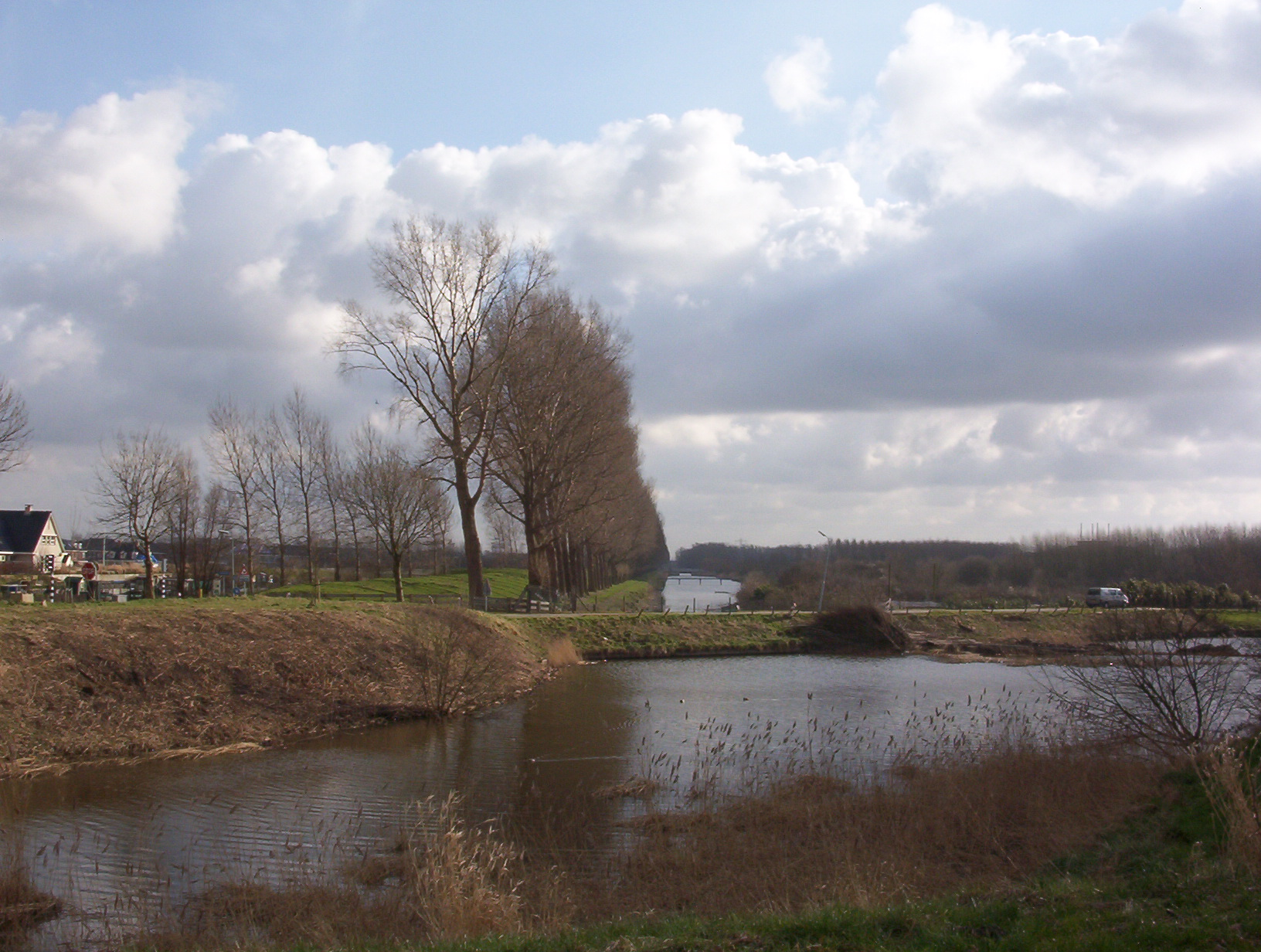
View of the geniedijk, looking southwest from fort Vijfhuizen

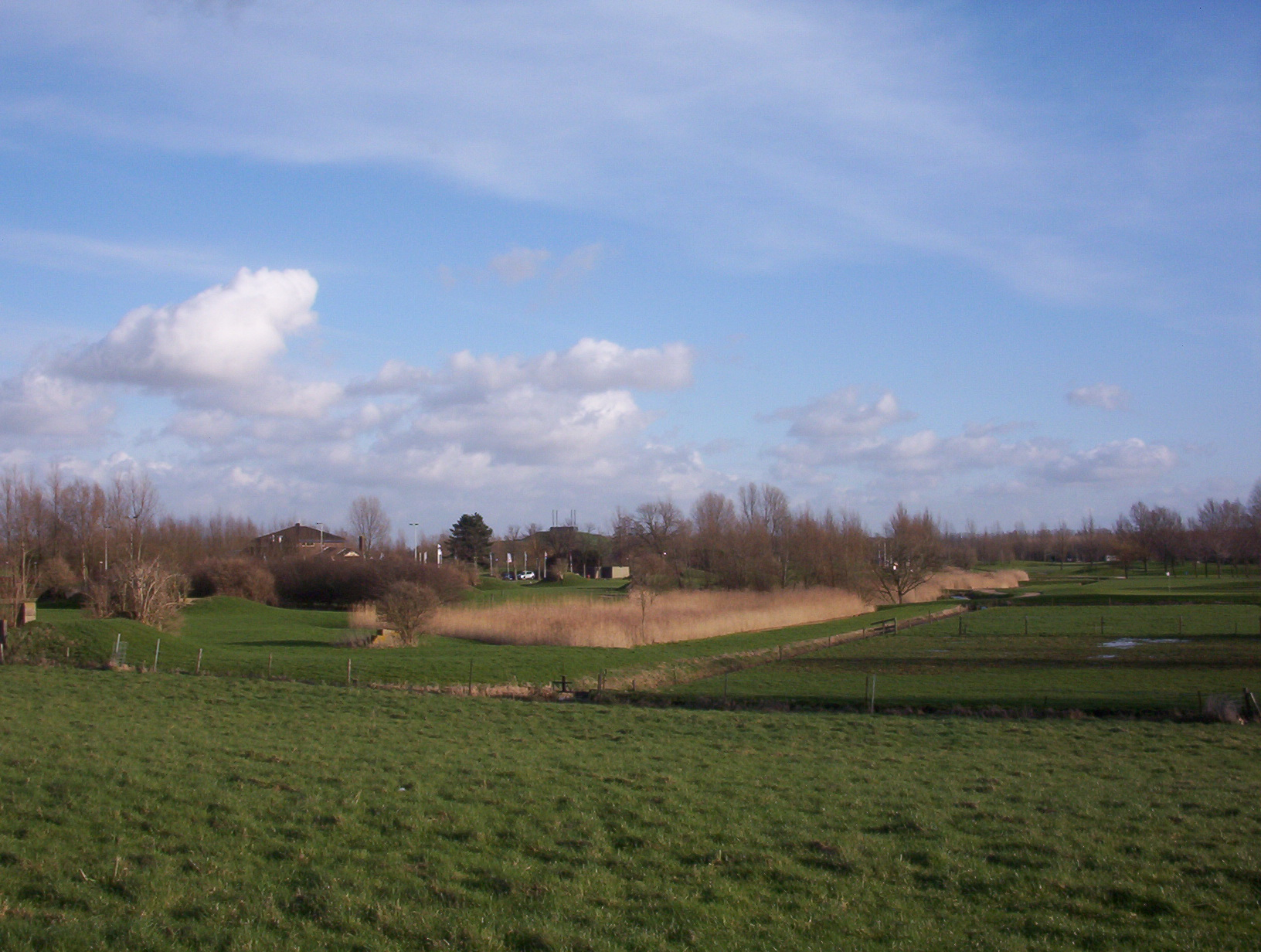
View of bunkers, representing fore position of fort Vijfhuizen

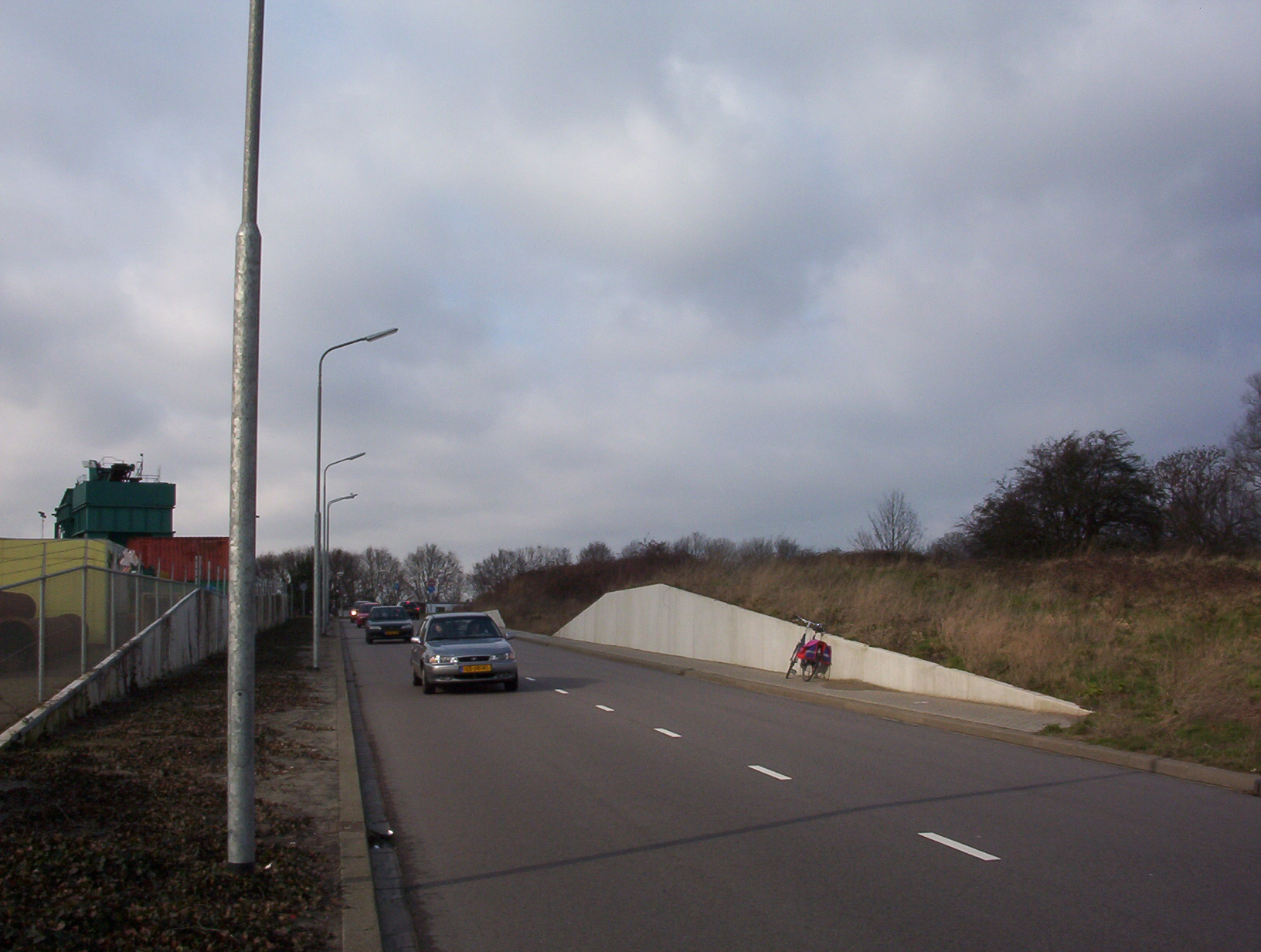
View of the road crossing the bunkers of fort Cruquius, the secondmost fore position of fort Vijfhuizen (seen from below the dike looking up towards the ringvaart. The trees are on the Heemstede side of the canal).

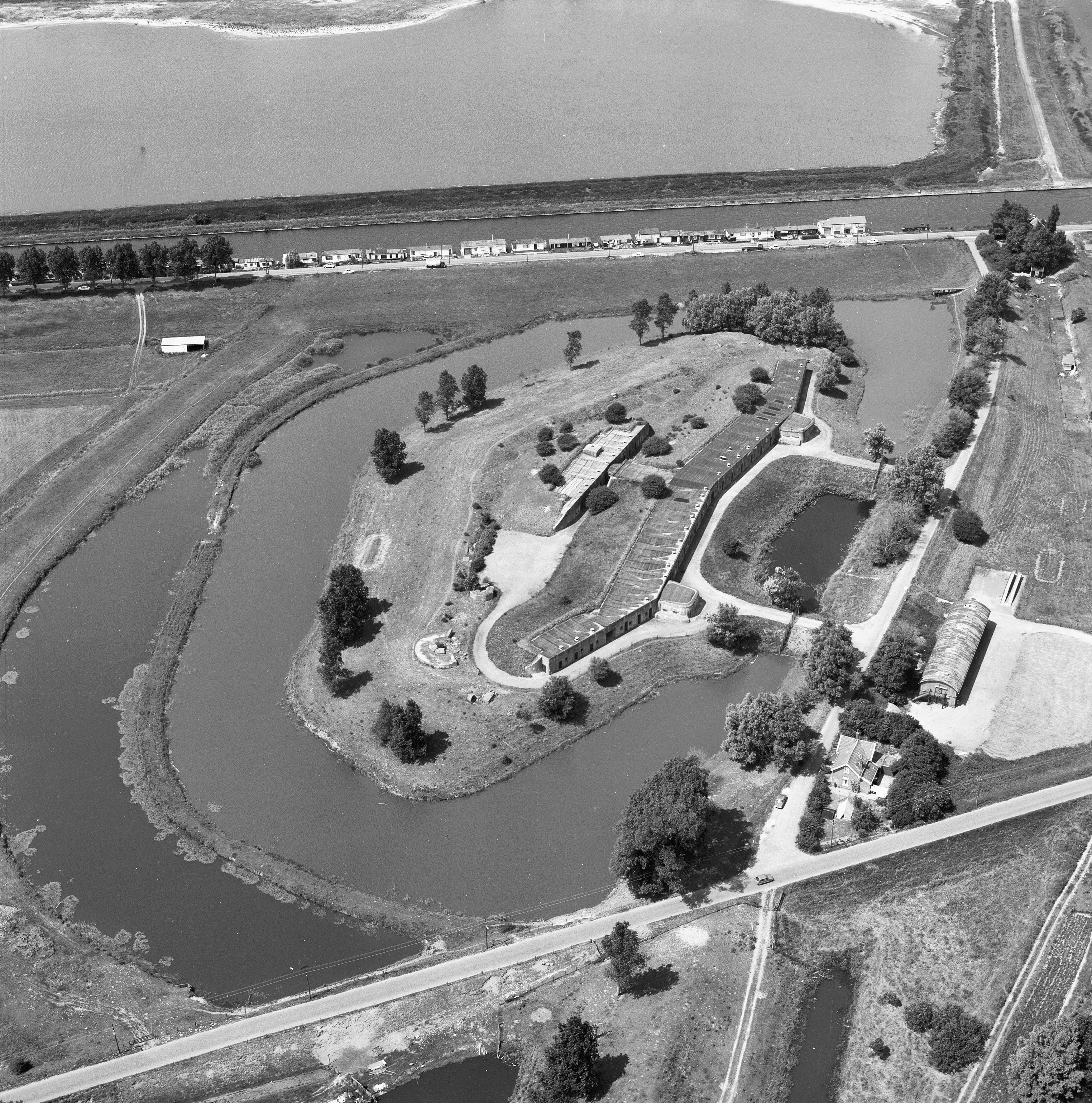
Old aerial photo of the fort and surroundings along the ringvaart canal
