= Rundetaarn =

Historic tower in Copenhagen, Denmark

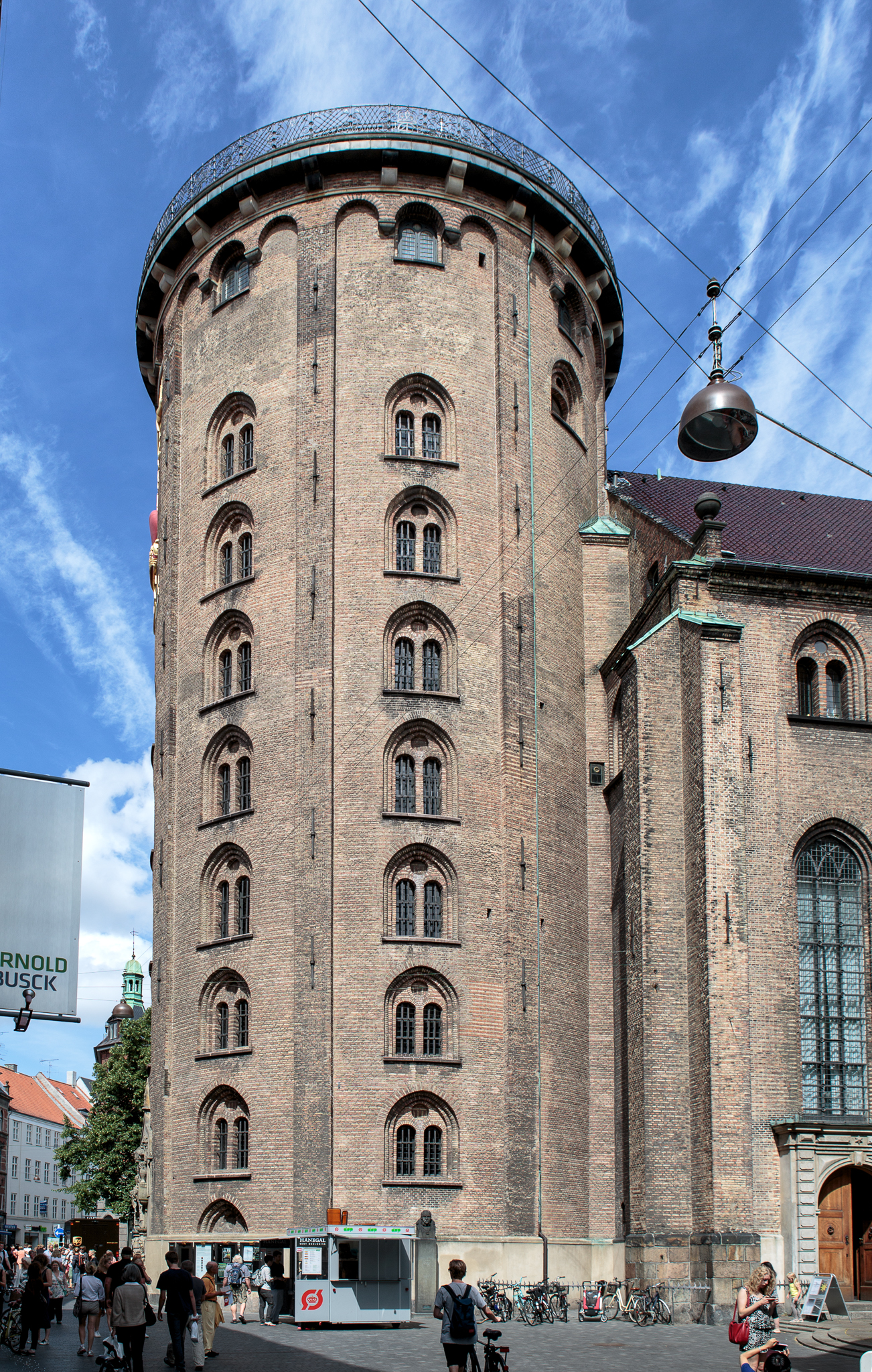

- Location within Copenhagen
- Former names: Stellaburgis Hafniens

General information
- Architectural style: Dutch Baroque
- Construction started: 1637
- Completed: 1642
- Client: Christian IV of Denmark

Height
- Height: 34.8 m (114 ft)

Design and construction
- Architect: Hans van Steenwinckel the Younger

Website
- Official website

The Round Tower (Danish: Rundetårn) is a 17th-century tower in Copenhagen, Denmark, one of the many architectural projects of Christian IV. Built as an astronomical observatory, it is noted for its equestrian staircase, a 7.5-turn helical corridor leading to the platform at the top (34.8 meters above ground), and its views over Copenhagen.

The tower is part of the Trinitatis Complex which also includes a chapel, the Trinitatis Church, and an academic library, which were the first facilities of the Copenhagen University Library founded in 1482.

== History ==
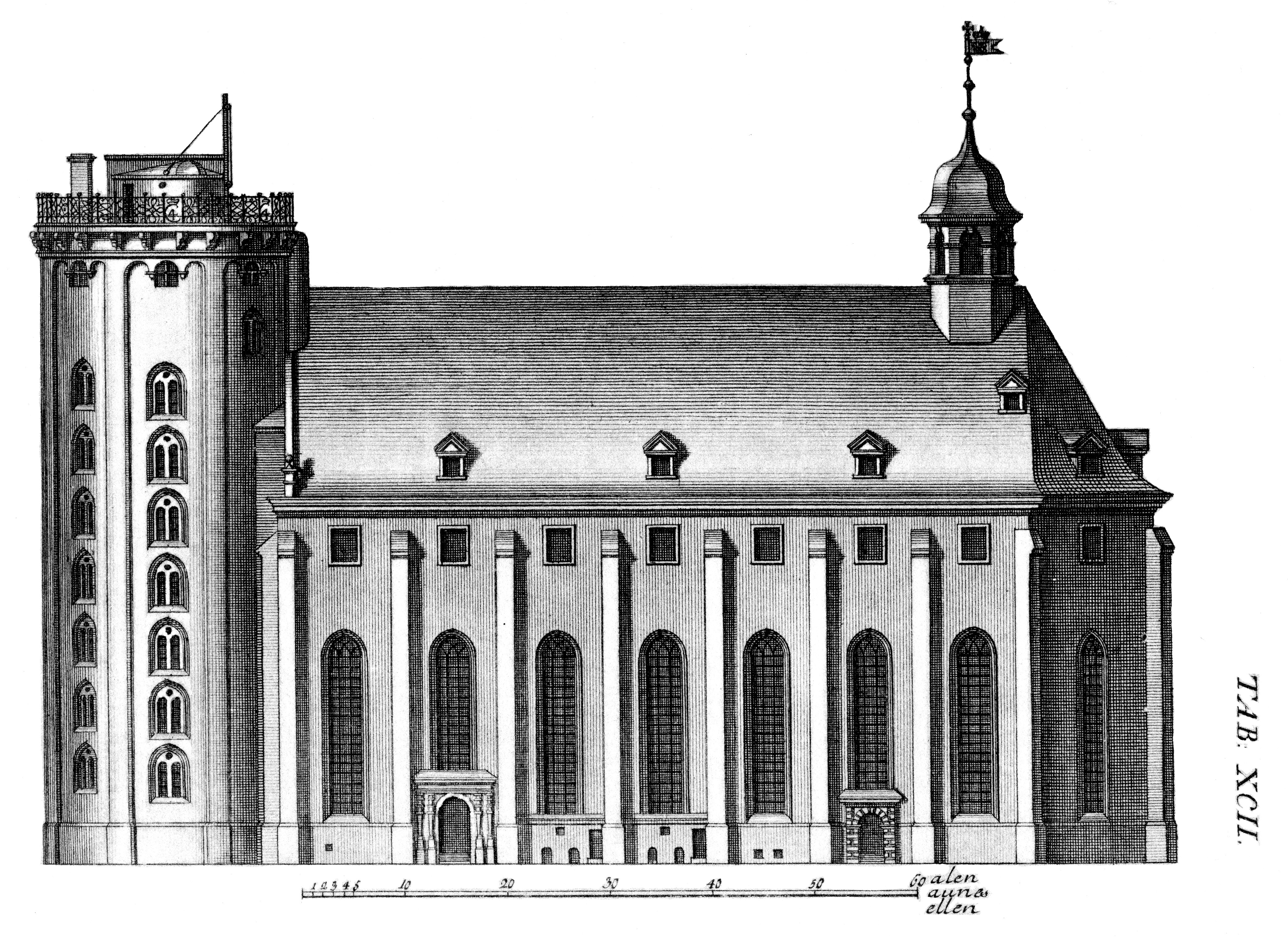
Rundetaarn. Illustration from the architect Laurids de Thurah's Hafnia hodierna of 1748.

=== Background ===
Astronomy grew in importance in 17th-century Europe. Countries began competing with each other in establishing colonies, creating a need for accurate navigation across the oceans. Many national observatories were therefore established, the first in 1632 at Leiden in the Dutch Republic. Only five years later the Round Tower Observatory, first referred to as STELLÆBURGI REGII HAUNIENSIS, followed.

=== Planning and preparations ===
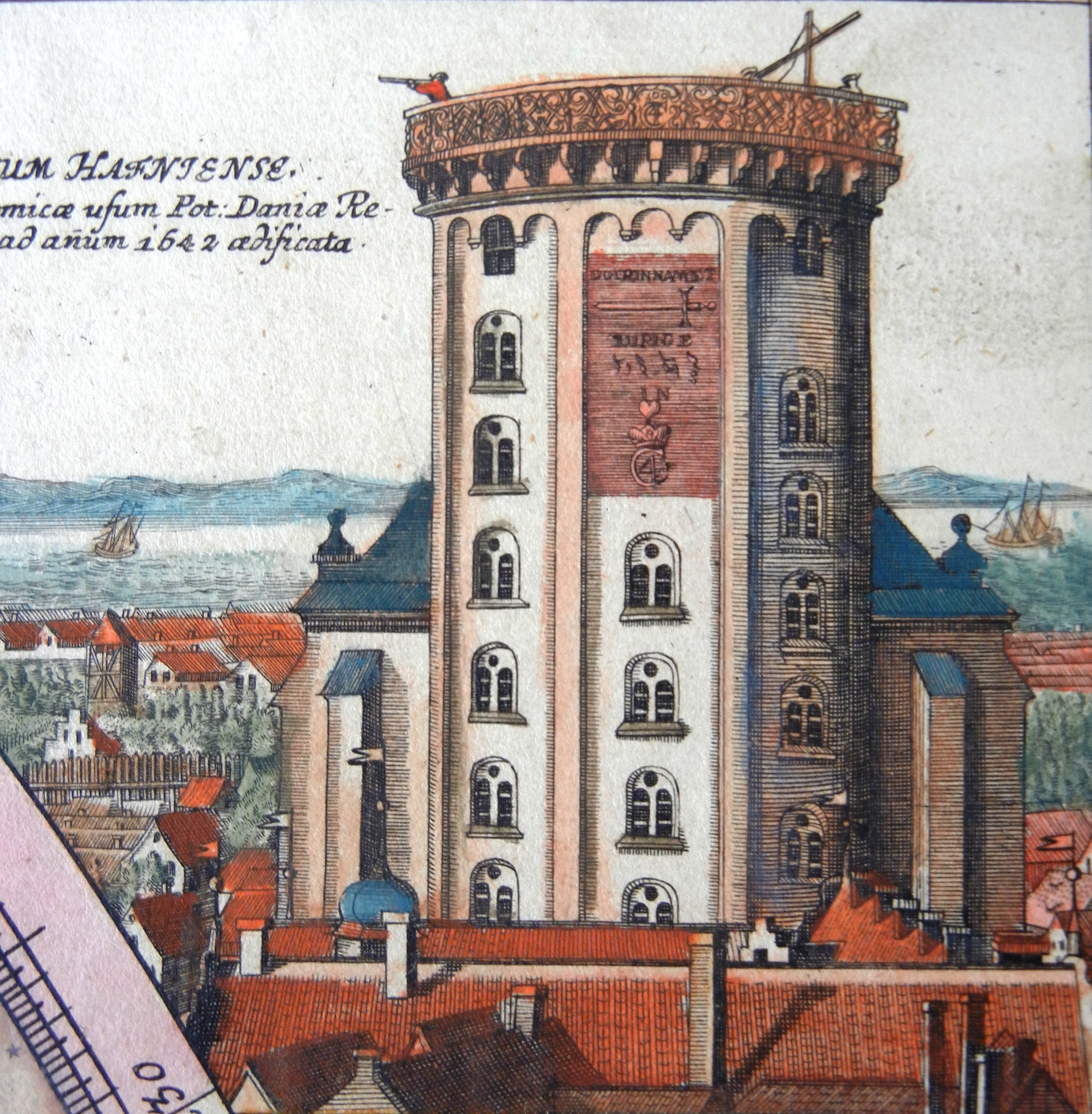
Vignette of Rundetaarn Observatory, as depicted Johann Doppelmayr's map of the southern celestial hemisphere, ca. 1742.

After Tycho Brahe fell out of favour and left Denmark, Christian Longomontanus became Christian IV's new astronomer and the first professor of astronomy at the University of Copenhagen. In 1625 he suggested the king build an astronomical tower as a replacement for Brahe's Stjerneborg which had been demolished.

Longomontanus' initial proposal was to erect the new observatory on the top of the hill Solbjerget, now known as Valby Bakke. But since there were also plans for the construction of a new students' church and a library for the university, the idea of merging the three buildings into one grand complex emerged.

Already in 1622, Christian IV had bought the land where it was ultimately decided to build the Trinitatis Complex. His original plans for the site are not known but as it was conveniently located next to the Regensen dormitories and the university, it was chosen for his new prestigious project.

Although there is no clear proof, it is generally accepted that Hans van Steenwinckel the Younger was charged with the commission to design the new edifice though he did not live to see the tower completed.

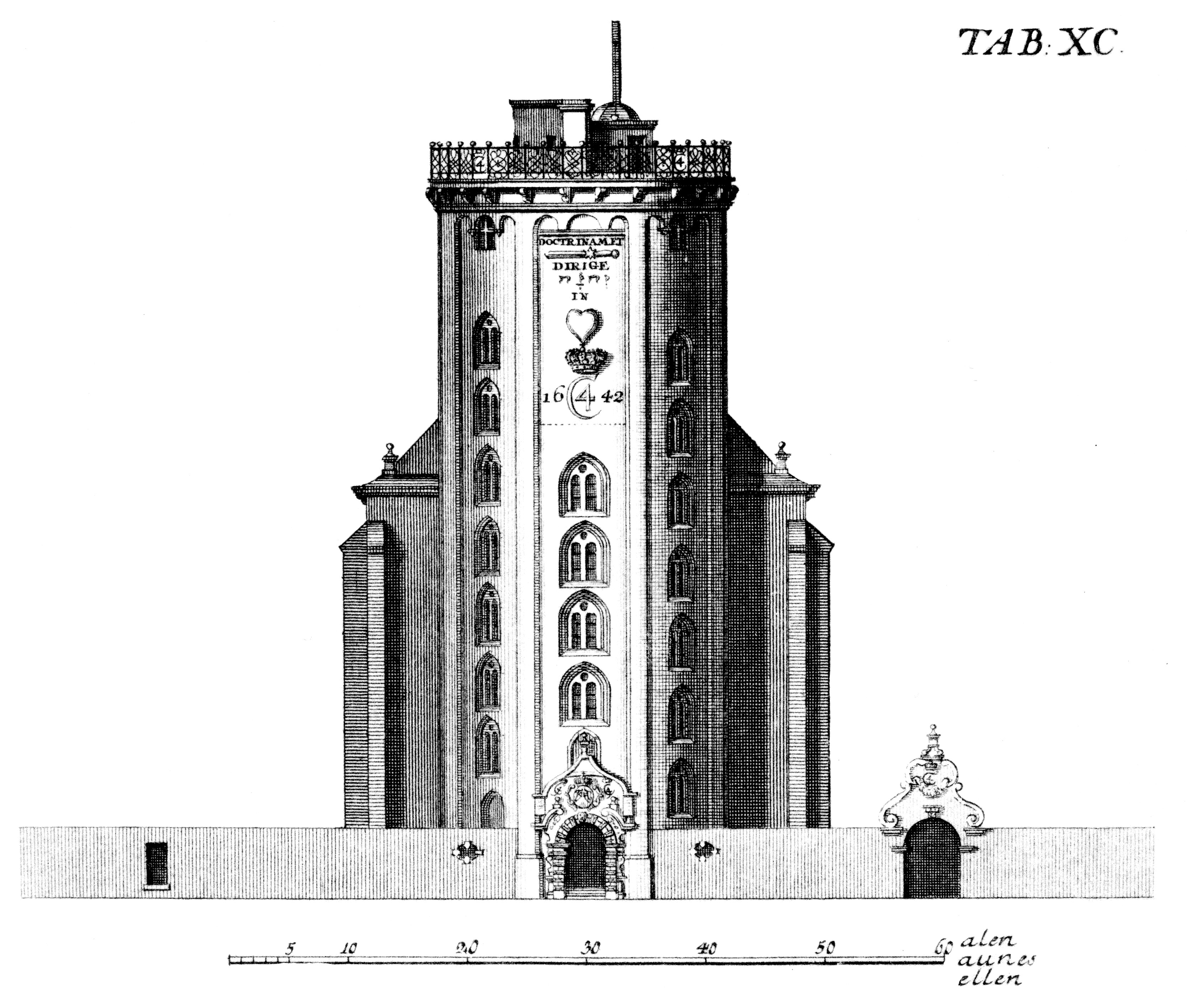
Cross section of the tower and the church from Thurah's Hafnia Hodierna

From 24 November 1636, stones were brought to the site for the foundation, first from the city's ramparts and later from the area around Roskilde. Bricks were ordered from the Netherlands since local manufacturers could not meet the high quality standards requested. In February 1637, a contract was signed with a Henrik van Dingklage in Emden for the supply of bricks for the construction. The first three ship loads were to be delivered in May, the next three loads the following month and the remainder on demand.

The Trinitatis Complex was set for construction in a crowded neighbourhood of narrow streets and alleyways. The area first had to be cleared. On 18 April 1637, 200 men, soldiers and personnel from Bremerholm began to demolish the half-timbered houses occupying the site.

=== Construction phase ===
The foundation stone was laid on 7 July 1637. When Hans van Steenwinckel died on 6 August 1639, Leonhard Blasius was brought to Denmark from the Netherlands as new Royal Building Master. Unlike his predecessor, he would become a mere transitional figure in Danish architecture, dying just four years after his arrival in the country without leaving any notable buildings of his own design. On several occasions construction work came to a standstill due to shortage of funds. Churches in Denmark and Norway were therefore ordered to contribute a share of their earnings during the construction years. In 1642, the tower was finally completed, though the church was completed only in 1657 and the library in 1657.

=== Time as an observatory ===
Christian Longomontanus became the first director of the observatory. In the Great Fire of 1728 the Trinitatis Complex was severely damaged but was rebuilt.

The first people with a home in the Round Tower were probably astronomers thus living close to their work in the Observatory. Most of the time, the leading observer lived in a professor's residence down in the city, while one or two employees lived in small rooms at the top of the tower. The earliest inhabitant of the Round Tower was observer Peder Horrebow who lodged there in 1753.

=== Demise and later years ===
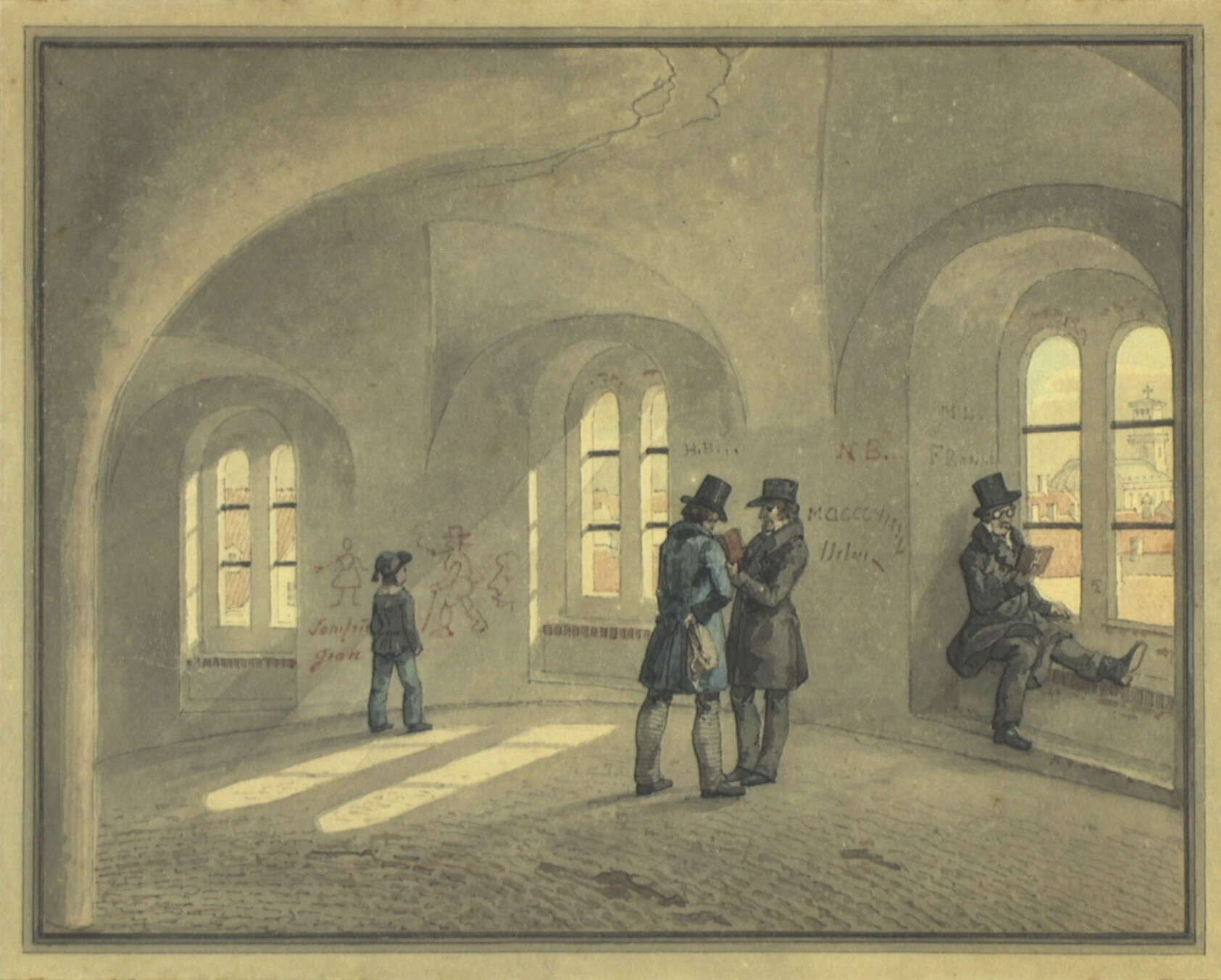
The interior of the tower on a drawing by H.G.F. Holm in connection with his proposal to move the tower to a position next to the church

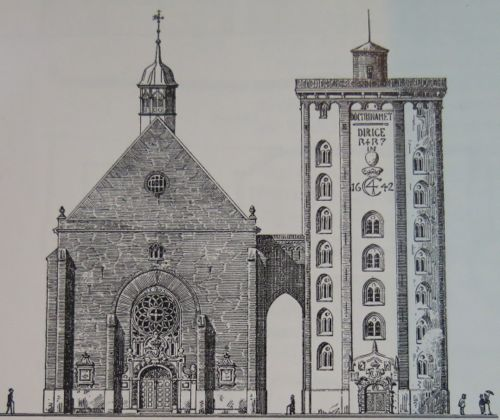
Rendering made by Anton Rosen in connection with his proposal to move the tower to a position next to the church

During the early 19th century, the Round Tower became outdated as an astronomical observatory. Instruments were growing still larger while the tower could not be expanded and, at the same time, light pollution from the surrounding city and vibrations caused by the ever increasing traffic in the streets below had made the observations inaccurate. The University therefore decided to build Østervold Observatory on the old bastioned fortifications of the city, which had become outdated and were being decommissioned. The new observatory was inaugurated in 1861 to the design of Christian Hansen.

=== Notable ascents ===
- In 1716, The Czar Peter the Great ascended the staircase on horseback while visiting Copenhagen. His wife, Catherine I, reportedly ascended behind him in a carriage.
- In 1902, a Beaufort car was the first motorised vehicle to ascend this Round Tower.
- A medal in the Round Tower's collection of medals indicates that the first bicycle race held in the tower took place as early as 1888, possibly in connection with The Nordic exhibition of Industry, Agriculture, and Art.
- In 1911, the newspaper Socialdemokraten arranged a bicycle race down the Round Tower.
- In 1971, Ole Ritter won a bicycle race against Leif Mortensen up the Round Tower in a time of 55.3 seconds.
- In 1993, Henrik Djernis won a bicycle race against Jens Veggerby in a time of 50.05 seconds.
- In 1989, Thomas Olsen went up and down the Round Tower on a unicycle in 1 minute and 48.7 seconds, which is a world record.

== Architecture ==
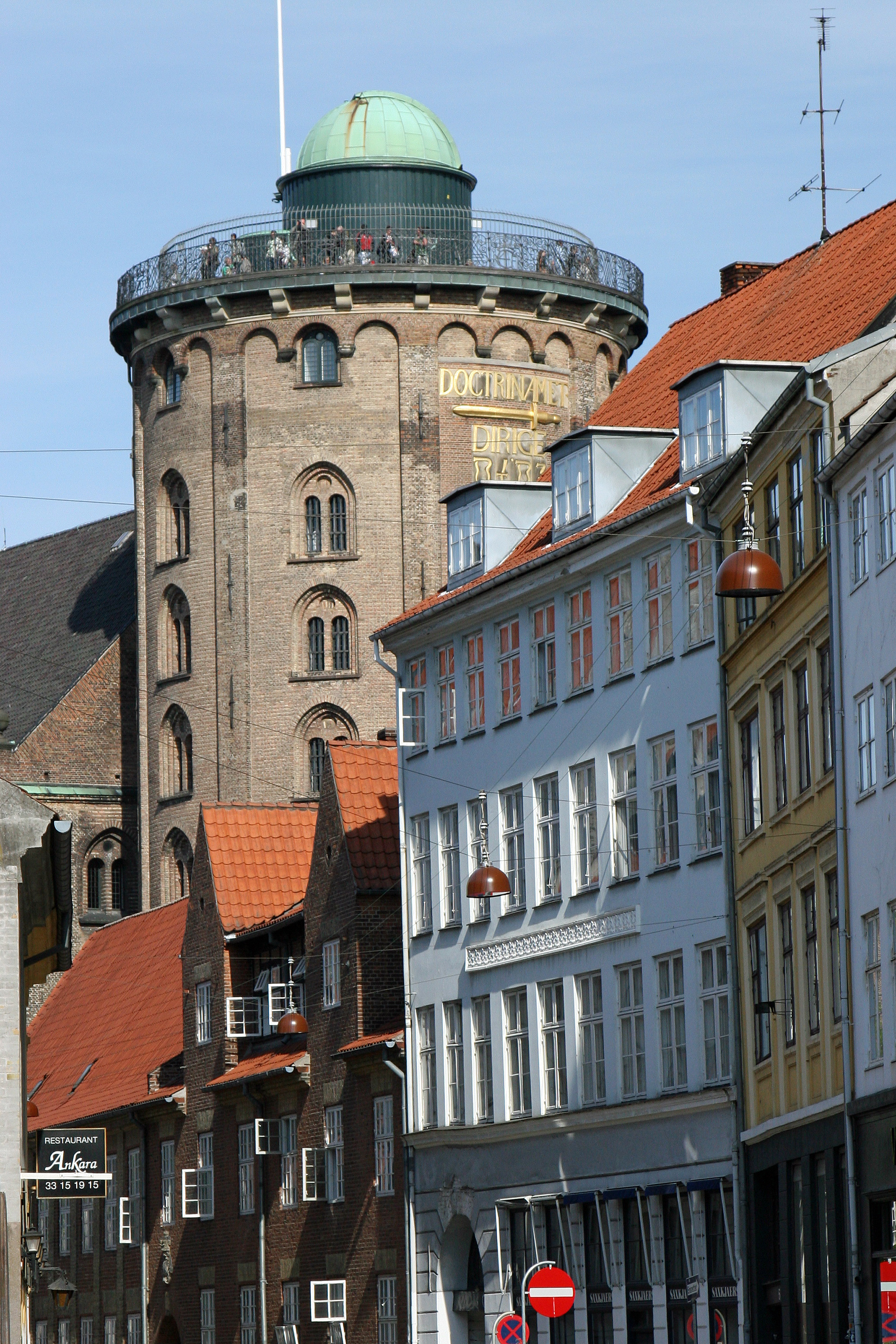
Rundetaarn seen from Krystalgade

The Round Tower is a cylindrical tower built in masonry of alternating yellow and red bricks, the colours of the Oldenburgs. The bricks used were manufactured in the Netherlands and are of a hard-burned, slender type known as muffer or mopper. On the rear side, it is attached to the Trinitatis Church, but it has never served as a church tower.

Steenwinckel — whose name is otherwise synonymous with Dutch Renaissance architecture in Denmark — with the Trinitatis Complex has left his signature style. Unlike his other buildings with their lavish ornamentations and extravagant spires, the complex is built to a focused and restrained design. Hans van Steenwinckel must have been up on the situation in Holland, cognizant that the style which he had once learned from Hendrick de Keyser had been altogether abandoned.

The architects now setting the agenda in the Netherlands, masters such as Jacob van Kampen (Amsterdam City Hall), Pieter Post (Mauritshuis in the Hague) and Philip Vingboons, now favoured a style characterized by sobriety and restraint. It is now known as Dutch Baroque or sometimes Dutch Classicism. Its proponents often relied on the theoretical works such as those of Andrea Palladio and of Jacopo Barozzi da Vignola. Steenwinckel may have paid a visit to his native Netherlands prior to his change in style but it will have been too early for him to have seen any of the period's buildings realized.

=== Spiral ramp ===
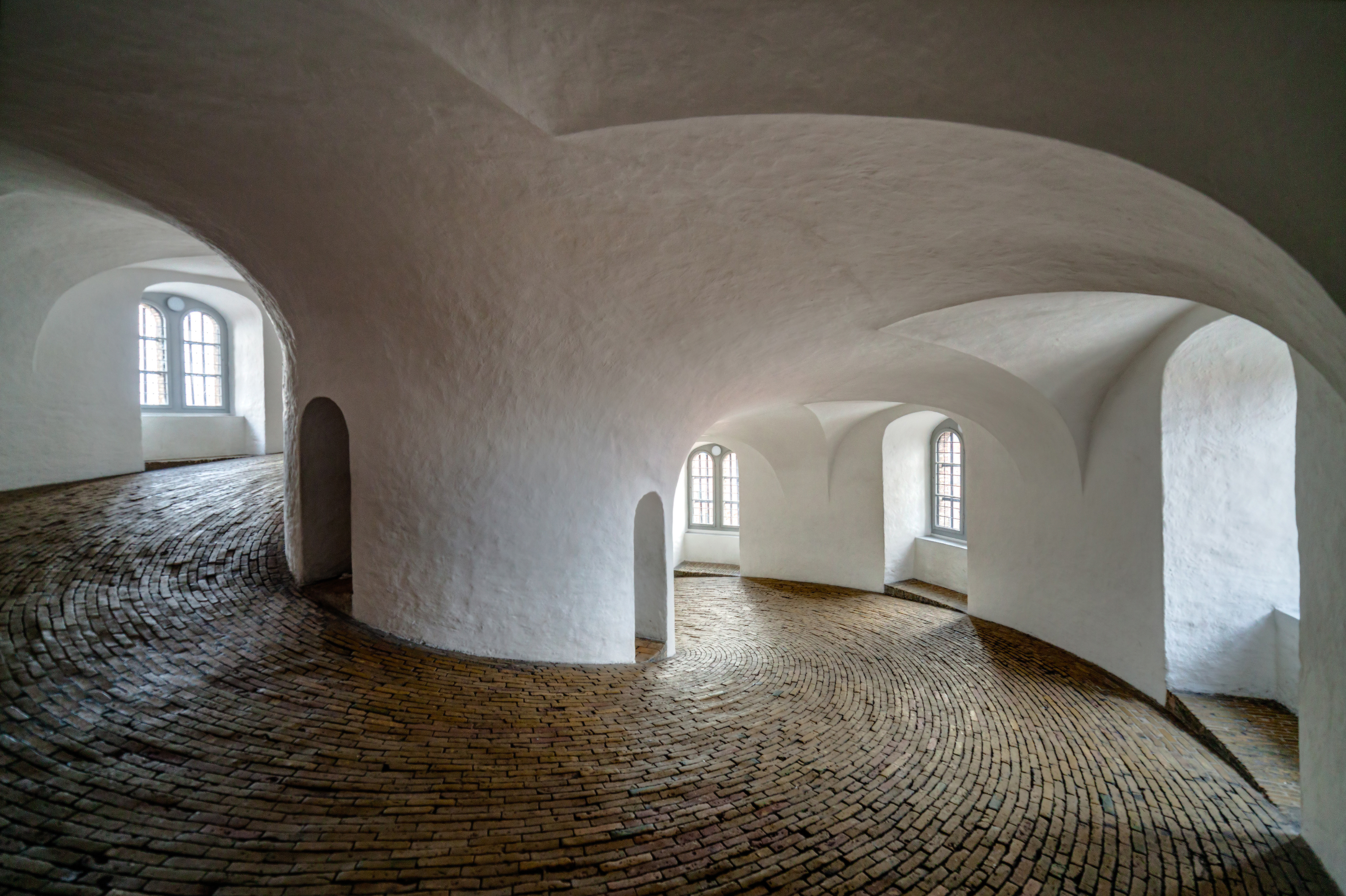
Inside view of the spiral ramp

Instead of stairs, a 7.5-turn spiral ramp forms the only access way to the towertop observatory as well as the Library Hall and the Bell-Ringer's Loft, both located above the church. The ramp turns 7.5 times around the hollow masonry core of the tower before reaching the observation deck and observatory at the top, on the way also affording access to the Library Hall as well as the Ringer's Loft. This design was chosen to allow a horse and carriage to reach the library, moving books in and out of the library as well as transporting heavy and sensitive instruments to the observatory.

The winding corridor has a length of 210 m, climbing 3.74 m per turn. Along the outer wall the corridor has a length of 257.5 m and a grade of 10%, while along the wall of the inner core the corridor is only 85.5 m long but has a grade of 33%.

=== Observation deck ===
The observation deck is located 34.8 m above street level. Along the edge of the platform runs a wrought-iron lattice made in 1643 by Kaspar Fincke, Court Artist in metalwork. In the latticework, Christian IV's monogram and the letters RFP are seen, the letters representing the King's motto: Regna Firmat Pietas – Piety strengthens the Realms.

=== Observatory ===
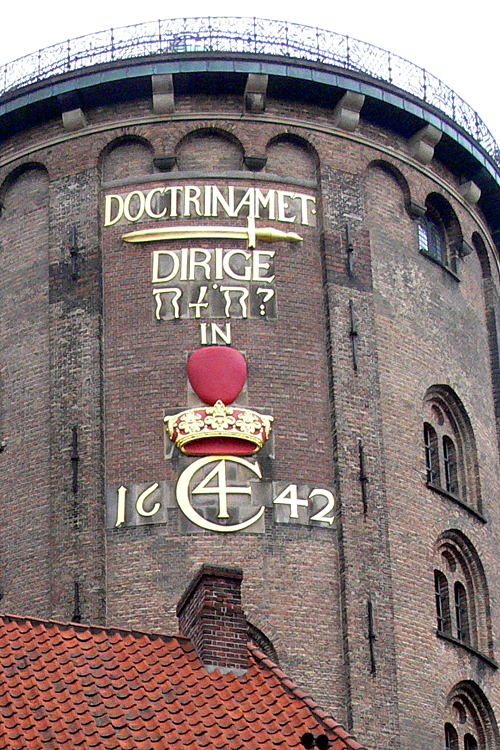
Inside view of the rebus inscription on the façade

The observatory is a small domed building, built on the roof of the tower. Built in 1929, the current observatory is 7 m high and has a diameter of 6 m. Access is by a narrow winding stone staircase from the observation deck.

=== Rebus inscription ===
On the upper part of the façade of the tower, there is a gilded rebus inscription. Christian IV's draft of it, written in his own hand writing, is kept at the Danish National Archives. The rebus includes the four Hebrew consonants of the Tetragrammaton. The rebus can be interpreted in the following way: Lead Jehovah, the right teaching and justice into the heart of the crowned King Christian IV, 1642.

== Toilet ==
The tower contains a toilet which consists of a seat almost at the top and a shaft leading down to the bottom floor built into the hollow core.

== The Round Tower today ==
Today the tower serves as an observation tower, a public astronomical observatory, an exhibition and concert venue and a historical monument.

=== Public observatory ===
The telescope in Rundetårn, pictured in 2026.

In 1860 the University of Copenhagen decommissioned the Round Tower as a university observatory but in 1928 it was reconstructed as an observatory with access for amateur astronomers and the general public. It is open from mid-October to mid-March.

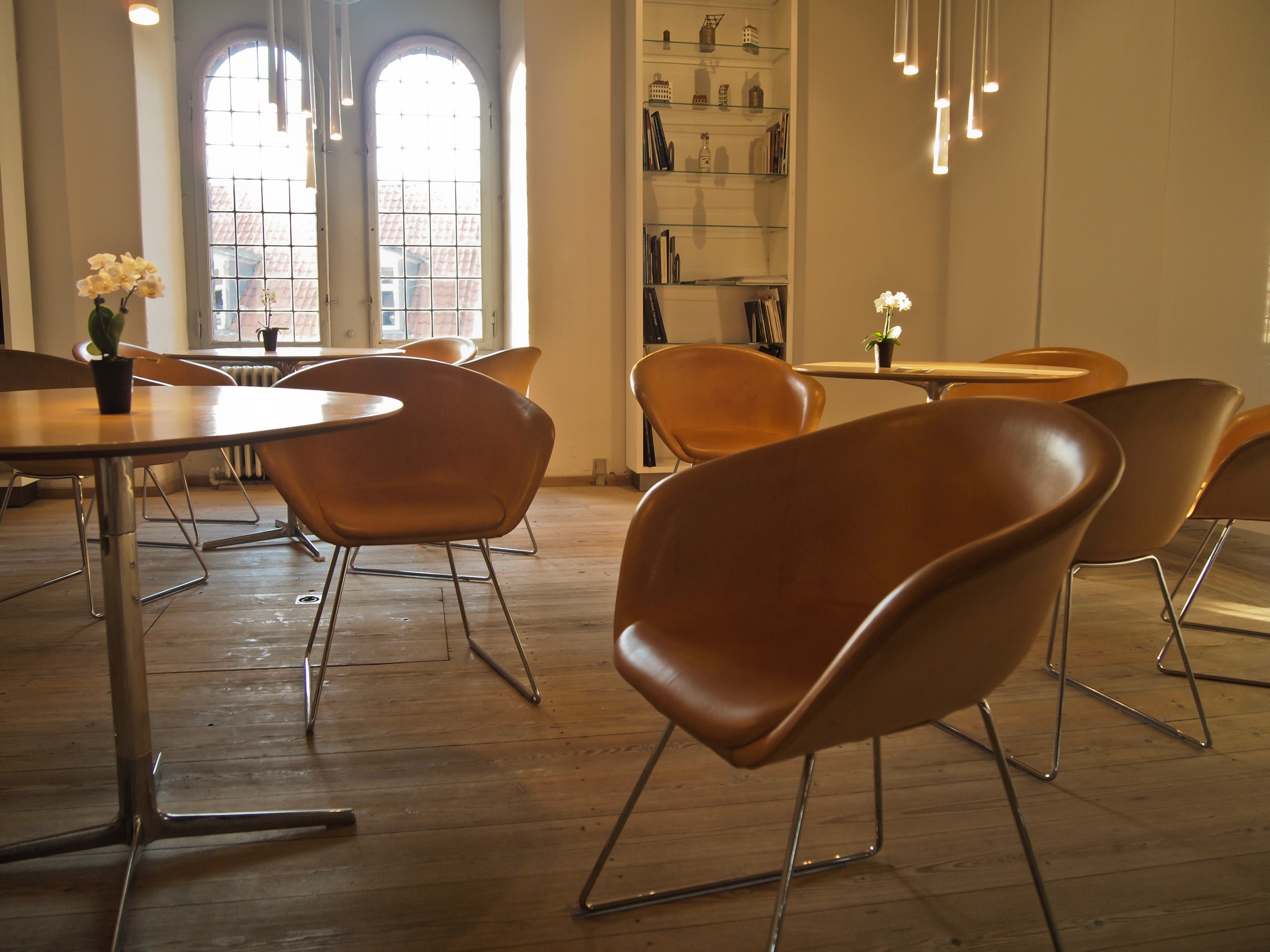
The Library Hall

=== Exhibitions and concerts ===
Since 1987, the Library Hall which lies above The Trinitatis Church, has served as an exhibition space, featuring various exhibitions of art, culture, history and science. At the same time, it is used as a concert venue, every year hosting around a hundred concerts. The Library Hall (Bibliotekssalen) of Rundetaarn has hosted numerous exhibitions featuring Danish and international artists, such as Asger Jorn, whose graphic works were exhibited in Jorn i Rundetaarn (1992), and Fluxus pioneer Wolf Vostell, who contributed to the politically charged group exhibition Berlin uden grænser (1991). Other artists who have shown their work include the ceramic sculptor Nina Hole (1987), who participated in the exhibition Danmark i Farver og Form, and the Danish illustrator and author Ib Spang Olsen (2015), who was featured in Håndens arbejde, åndens værk. The tower continues to host contemporary artists, such as the duo Christoph Mügge and Sebastian Mügge, who explored the building's literary history with the site-specific installation Lost Library Legends (2024). In 2026, Rundetaarn marked the 350th anniversary of the discovery of the speed of light by Danish astronomer Ole Rømer with LIGHT YEAR 2026, a year of special exhibitions, concerts, and events including the Light Echoes exhibition, a collaboration between artists Ligia Bouton, Lea Porsager, and Semiconductor, and astrophysicists at the Niels Bohr Institute at Copenhagen.

=== Views ===
The observation deck affords extensive views over the rooftops of the old part of Copenhagen with its many spires, including the Marble Church, the Nikolaj contemporary art center, Christiansborg Palace, Christiansborg Slotskirke, the Church of the Holy Ghost, Copenhagen City Hall, Palace Hotel, the Church of Our Lady, St. Peter's Church, the Great Synagogue, St. Andrew's Church, Rosenborg Castle, the Church of Our Saviour and the pipes of Amagerværket. On clear days, both the Øresund Bridge and Sweden can be seen in the distance.

=== Rundetaarn Unicycle Race ===
Every year in spring, a unicycle race is held in the Round Tower. The contestants have to go up and down the tower. The world record, set in 1988, is 1 minute and 48.7 seconds.

== Cultural references ==
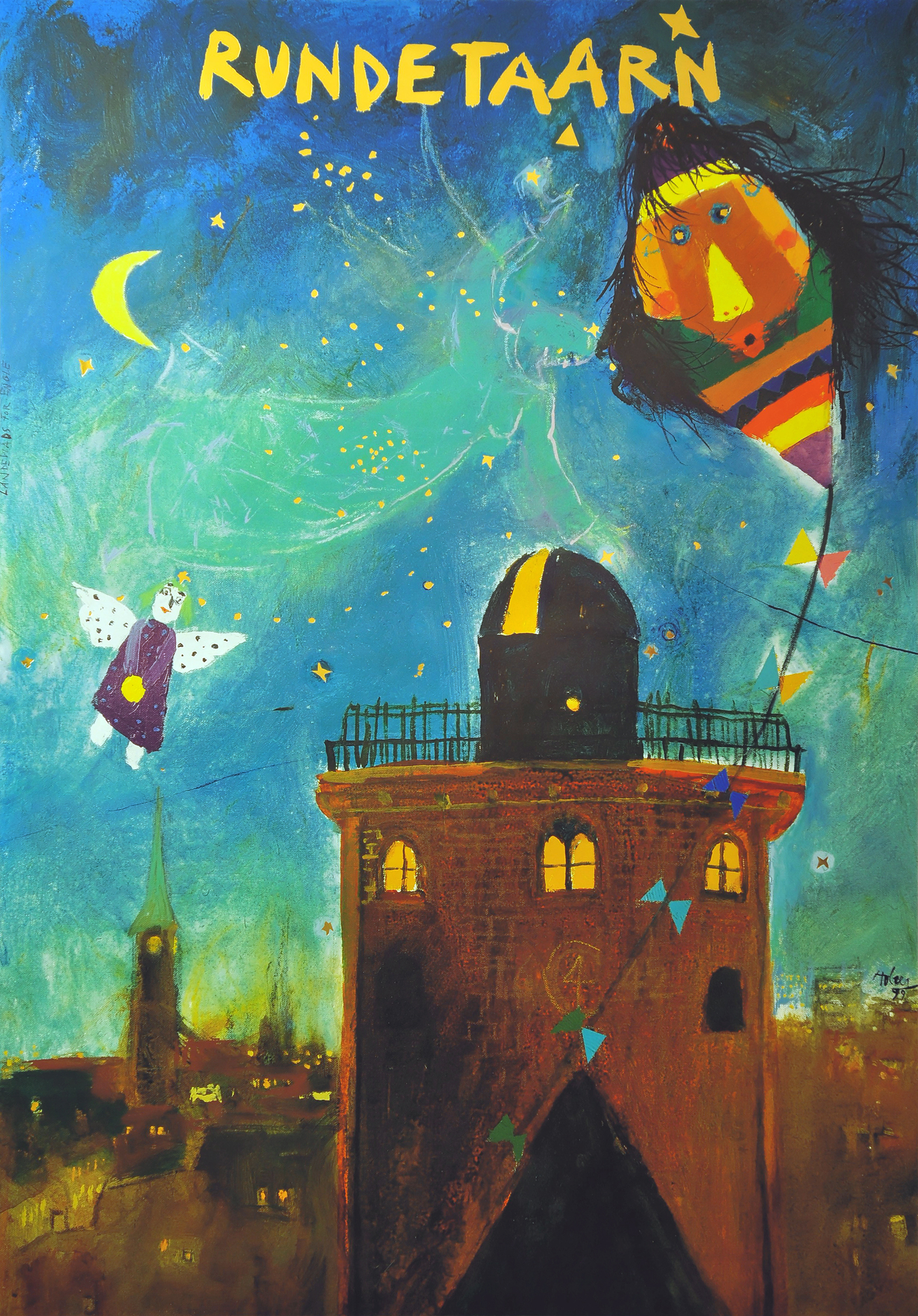
Adi Holzer: Rundetaarn 1999.

- In Hans Christian Andersen's fairy tale "The Tinderbox", the largest of the three dogs is said to have eyes as large as the Round Tower at Copenhagen.
- In another Hans Christian Andersen fairy tale, "The Elder-Tree Mother", an old married couple remembers how they used to go "up the Round Tower, and looked down on Copenhagen, and far, far away over the water; then we went to Friedericksberg, where the King and the Queen were sailing about in their splendid barges!".
- In Hans-Christian Andersen's novel, To Be, or Not To Be, the main character, Niels Bryde, is born and grows up in the Round Tower, where his father is a gatekeeper.
- A 1:3 scale replica of the tower has been built in the originally-Danish-settled city of Solvang, California.
- The asteroid 5505 Rundetaarn commemorates the tower.
- In Denmark, heights of buildings are often compared to the height of the Rundetaarn.
- A phrase in Danish is "Which is highest, the Rundetaarn or a thunderclap?" (loud and high are the same word in Danish). It is often used in a discussion when the opponent tries to compare incomparable quantities - see also Apples and oranges.
- The Round Tower is featured in the 2013 video game SimCity.

== See also ==
- Architecture of Denmark
- Østervold Observatory
- List of astronomical observatories
- List of astronomical societies
- Lists of telescopes
