= Sune (name) =

Sune can be an Afrikaans female name, or an old Nordic male name, derived from an ancient Nordic word for "son". Suñé is a surname of Spanish origin.

== Given name ==
- Sune Adolfsson (born 1950), Swedish biathlete
- Sune Agerschou (born 1974), Danish handballer
- Sune Almkvist (1886–1975), Swedish bandy player, hockey player footballer
- Sune Andersson (disambiguation), multiple people
- Sune Berg Hansen (born 1971), Danish chess grandmaster
- Sune Bergman (1952–2021), Swedish ice hockey player and manager
- Sune Bergström (1916–2004), Swedish biochemist
- Sune Carlson (1909–1999), Swedish economist
- Sune Carlsson (born 1931), Swedish sailor
- Sune Eriksson (born 1939), Finnish politician
- Sune Jonsson (1930–2009), Swedish documentary photographer and writer
- Sune Karlsson (1923–2006), Swedish motorcycle rider
- Sune Kiilerich (born 1990), Danish footballer
- Sune Larsson (born 1930), Swedish cross-country skier
- Sune Lindbäck (1915–1970), Swedish equestrian
- Sune Lindqvist (1887–1976), Swedish archaeologist and scholar
- Sune Lindström (1906–1989), Swedish architect
- Suné Luus (born 1996), South African cricketer
- Sune Malmström (1897–1961), Swedish tennis player
- Sune Mangs (1932–1994), Swedish actor
- Sune Rose Wagner (born 1973), Danish songwriter, guitarist and singer
- Sune Sandbring (1928–2021), Swedish footballer
- Sune Sandström (1939–2011), Swedish police officer
- Sune Sik (c. 1154–?), Swedish prince
- Sune Skagerling (1919–1997), Swedish bobsledder
- Sune Toft, Danish professor
- Sune van Zyl (born 1977), South African cricketer
- Sune Waldimir (1907–1967), Swedish composer
- Sune Wehlin (1923–2020), Swedish pentathlete
- Sune Wentzel (born 1971), Norwegian frisbeer
- Sune Wittmann (born 1995), Namibian cricketer
- Sune Wretling (1939–2007), Swedish ice hockey player
- Sune Zetterberg (1907–1962), Swedish footballer

== Surname ==
- Aleix Suñé (born 1986), Spanish para-alpine ski guide
- Francisco Suñé (born 1938), Spanish racing cyclist
- Roser Suñé Pascuet (born 1960), Andorran politician
- Rubén Suñé (1947–2019), Argentine football player
