= Beaufort (automobiles) =

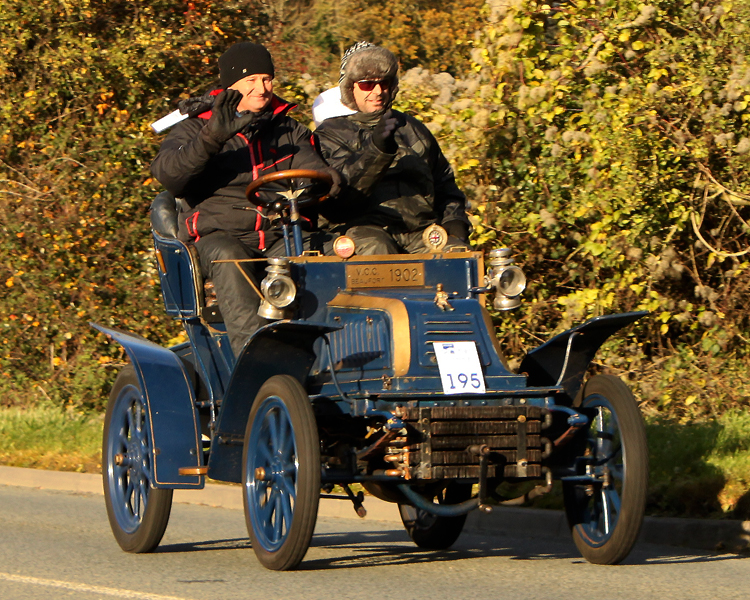
Beaufort 8HP Phaeton 1902

Beaufort was a German manufacturer of automobiles solely for the British market. It existed from 1901 to 1906 and was established with English capital.

A notable piece of company history is that a Beaufort car was the first vehicle to climb Copenhagen's 'Round Tower' landmark (1902).
