= University of Copenhagen Nano-Science Center =

Danish research center

Coordinates: 55.7001°N 12.5612°E

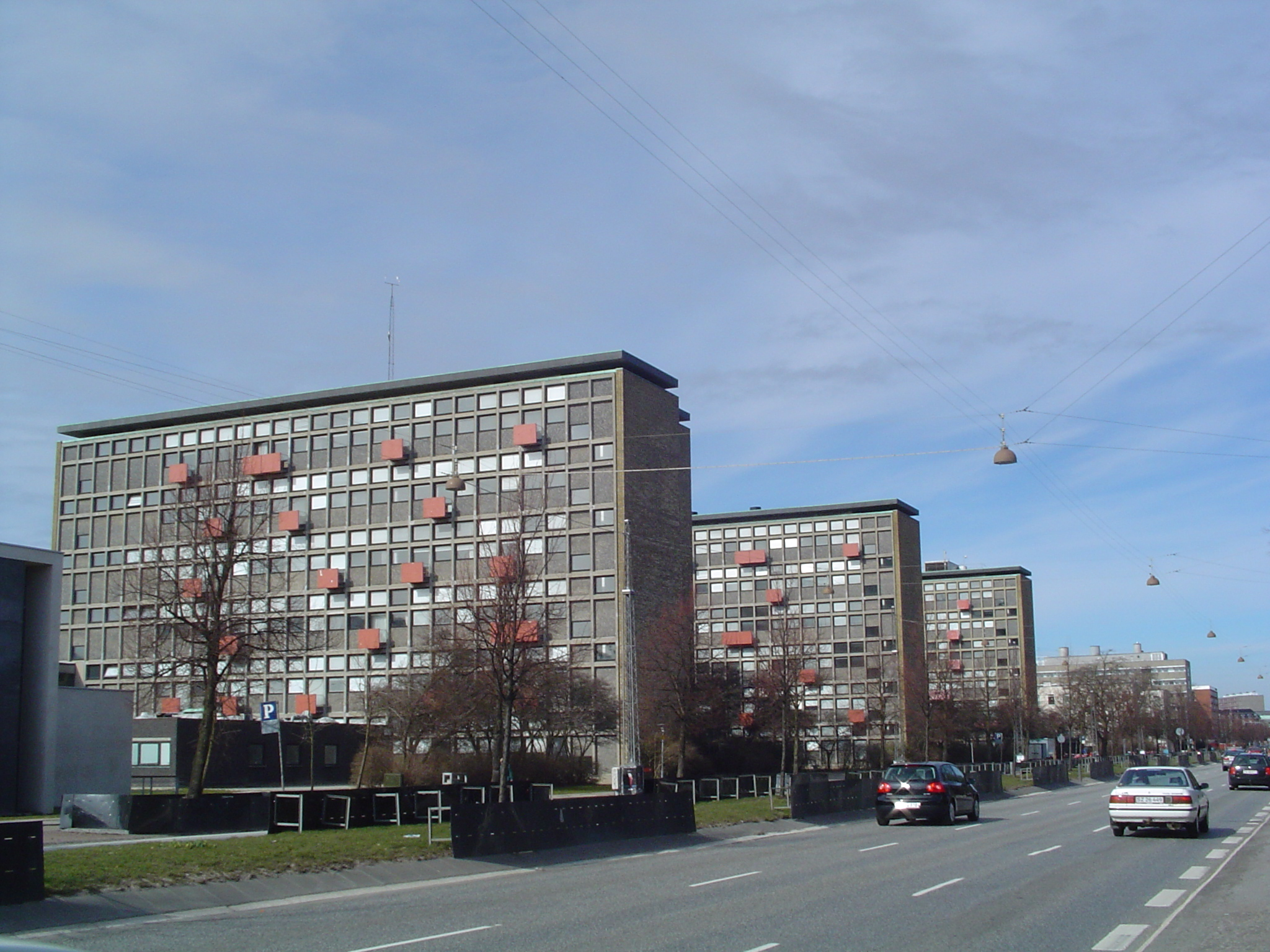
Interconnected buildings in the Hans Christian Ørsted Building complex. Nearest building houses the Nano-Science Center.

The Nano-Science Center is a center at the University of Copenhagen dedicated to the teaching and research of nanotechnology.

The Nano-Science Center was inaugurated in 2001 in a cooperation between the Niels Bohr Institute (physics) and the Department of Chemistry. It resides in the D block of the interconnected Hans Christian Ørsted Building complex.

The current chairman is professor Bo Wegge Laursen.

A new undergraduate program (3 years ending with a B.Sc. in nanotechnology) admitted the first students in September 2002, currently admitting about 60 students per year. Graduates are expected to continue to get a M.Sc. within a subfield of nanotechnology.

In total, more than 150 scientists, postdocs and PhD students are associated with the Center. Nano-Science Center has since the inauguration received more than EUR 150m overall in external funding from both private and public funding.

== Research ==
Current research includes theoretical and experimental nanophysics, synchrotron x-ray scattering, supramolecular surface chemistry, organic synthesis, biophysics, nanocontainers, molecular electronic properties and molecular biology.

=== Nanoflake ===
Nanoflake has been discovered in the Center. It is a perfect crystalline structure that also absorbs all light. Nanoflakes have the potential to convert up to 30 per cent of the solar energy into electricity, which is similar to present day solar cells. It can reduce the solar cell production costs because it uses less of the expensive semiconducting silicon in the process, due to the use of nanotechnology.

== Notable people ==
In 2011-2013 Professor Morten Meldal was Head of the Nano Science Center. He has since - in 2022 - won the Nobel Prize in Chemistry for his groundbreaking work with what is known as click chemistry – when a chemical reaction makes it possible to "snap" molecules together in simple ways.

== See also ==
- Niels Bohr Institute
- University of Copenhagen
