= Rikke Raben =

Danish sculptor and medallist (born 1965)

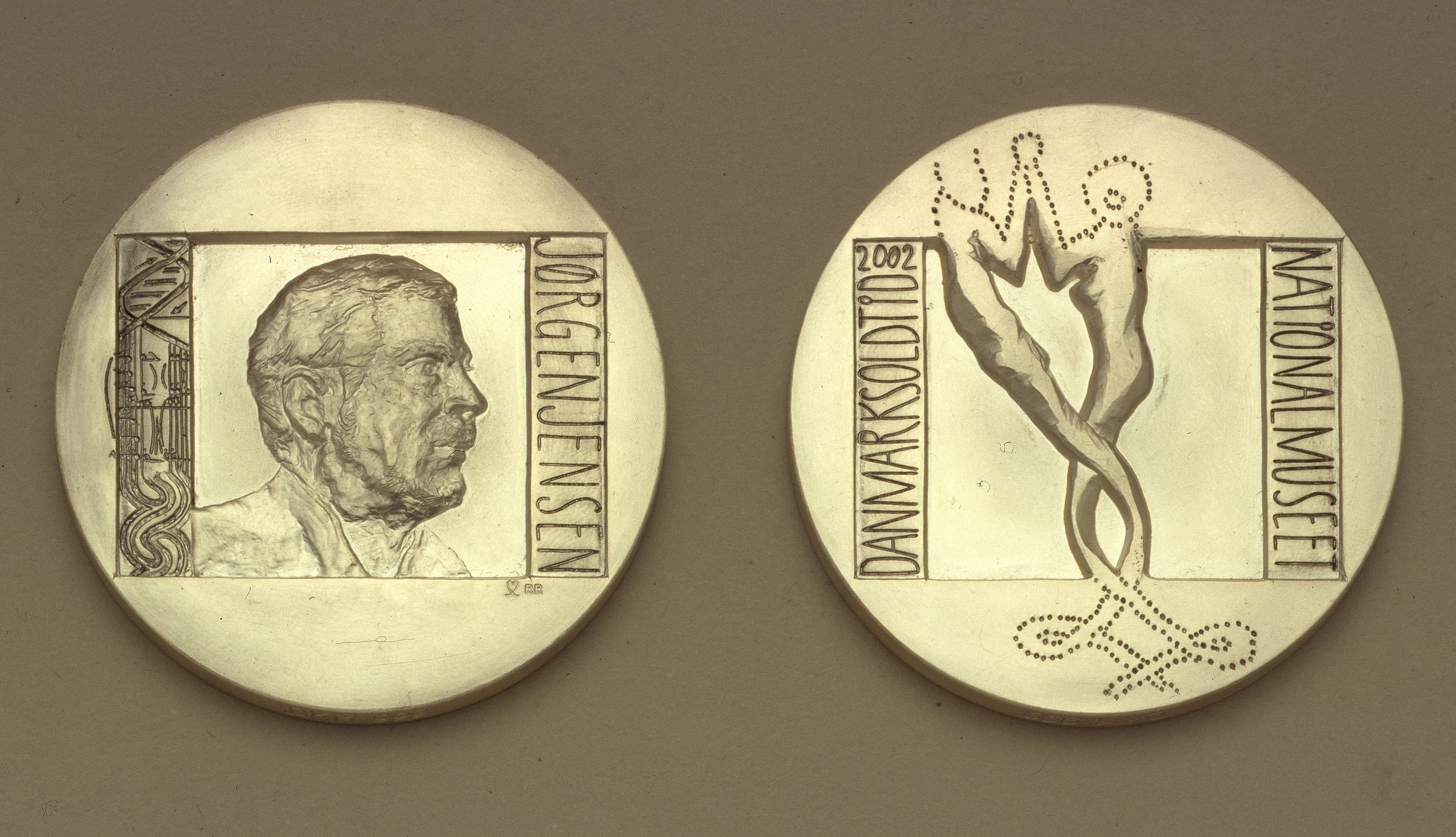
Danish National Museum Jørgen Jensen medal

Rikke Raben is a Danish sculptor and medallist.

== Early life ==
Raben was born in 1965 to film consultant, film director Frits Raben, and TV-producer, director and screenwriter Ulla Raben.

== Career ==
Raben's first sculpture was a full-figure sculpture of Aegeus (a copy of a lost Bissen sculpture) for the 1996 DR television series Bryggeren. Between 1987 and 2006 she worked for DR with production design on several film- and TV productions. In 2001 Raben was commissioned with portrait sculptures of Danish film director Lars von Trier and film producer Peter Aalbæk Jensen for the film production company Zentropa, and in 2002 she was commissioned by the National Museum of Denmark to create a portrait medal of professor Jørgen Jensen.

In 2010 she was given the assignment to design the Niels Bohr Institute's honorary medal. She has also created a relief of the four Nobel Laureates, George de Hevesy, Ben R. Mottelson, Aage Bohr and Niels Bohr, for the Niels Bohr Institute (2012). It can be viewed on a wall outside the institute on Blegdamsvej in Copenhagen.

In 2022 a relief portrait of Mrs. Birthe Meyer of the Meyer Foundation was commissioned by the Department of Clinical Physiology, Nuclear Medicine at Rigshospitalet in Copenhagen where it can be viewed.

In 2019, she was charged with the creation of a statue of the Danish author Karen Blixen (Isak Dinesen) for Sankt Annæ Plads in central Copenhagen. It was revealed in 2024.

Along with her public work, Rikke Raben has created full-figure sculptures, busts, reliefs and medals for private clients.

== Book ==
"Unity of Knowledge – Scrapbook from the Niels Bohr Institute". Strandberg Publishing, 2021.

== Awards ==
- Unidanmarkfondens kunstnerpris (2000)
