= Nordic House in the Faroe Islands =

Cultural institution in the Faroe Islands

Coordinates: 62.022039°N 6.784631°W

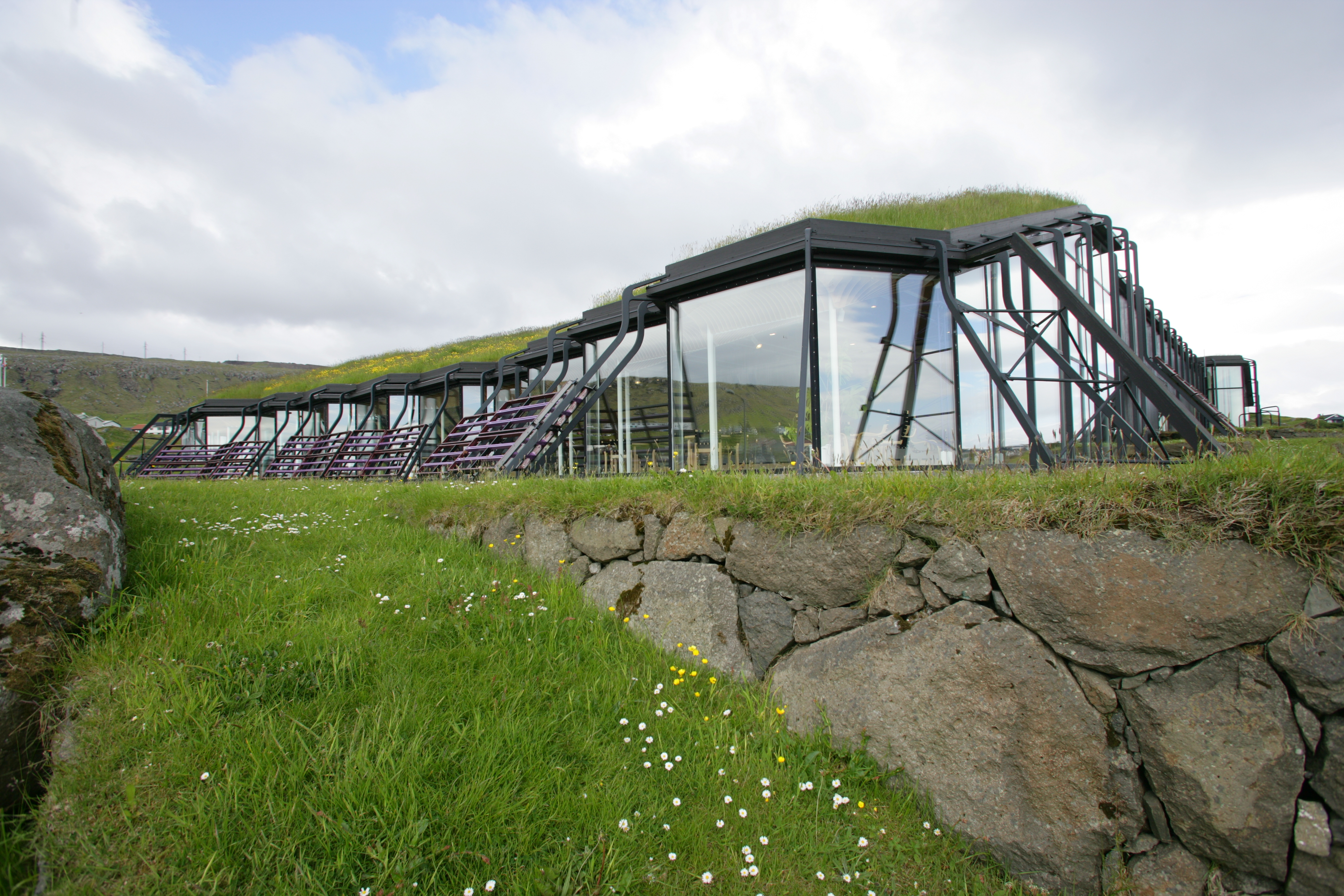
The Nordic House from the outside

The Nordic House (Faroese: Norðurlandahúsið) is a cultural institution in the Faroe Islands. Its aim is to support and promote Nordic and Faroese culture, locally and in the Nordic region.

== History ==
Erlendur Patursson (1913–1986), Faroese member of the Nordic Council, brought forward the idea of a Nordic cultural house in the Faroe Islands. A Nordic competition for architects was held in 1977, where 158 architects participated. Winners were Ola Steen from Norway and Kolbrún Ragnarsdóttir from Iceland. By staying true to folklore the architects built the Nordic House to resemble an enchanting hill of elves. The building opened in Tórshavn in 1983.

The Nordic House is organized as a cultural organization under the Nordic Council of Ministers. The Nordic House is run by a steering committee of eight, of which three are Faroese and five from the outside Nordic countries. Also, there is a local advisory body of 15 members, representing the Faroese cultural organizations. For a four-year period, the steering committee appoints a director of the house.

== Architecture ==
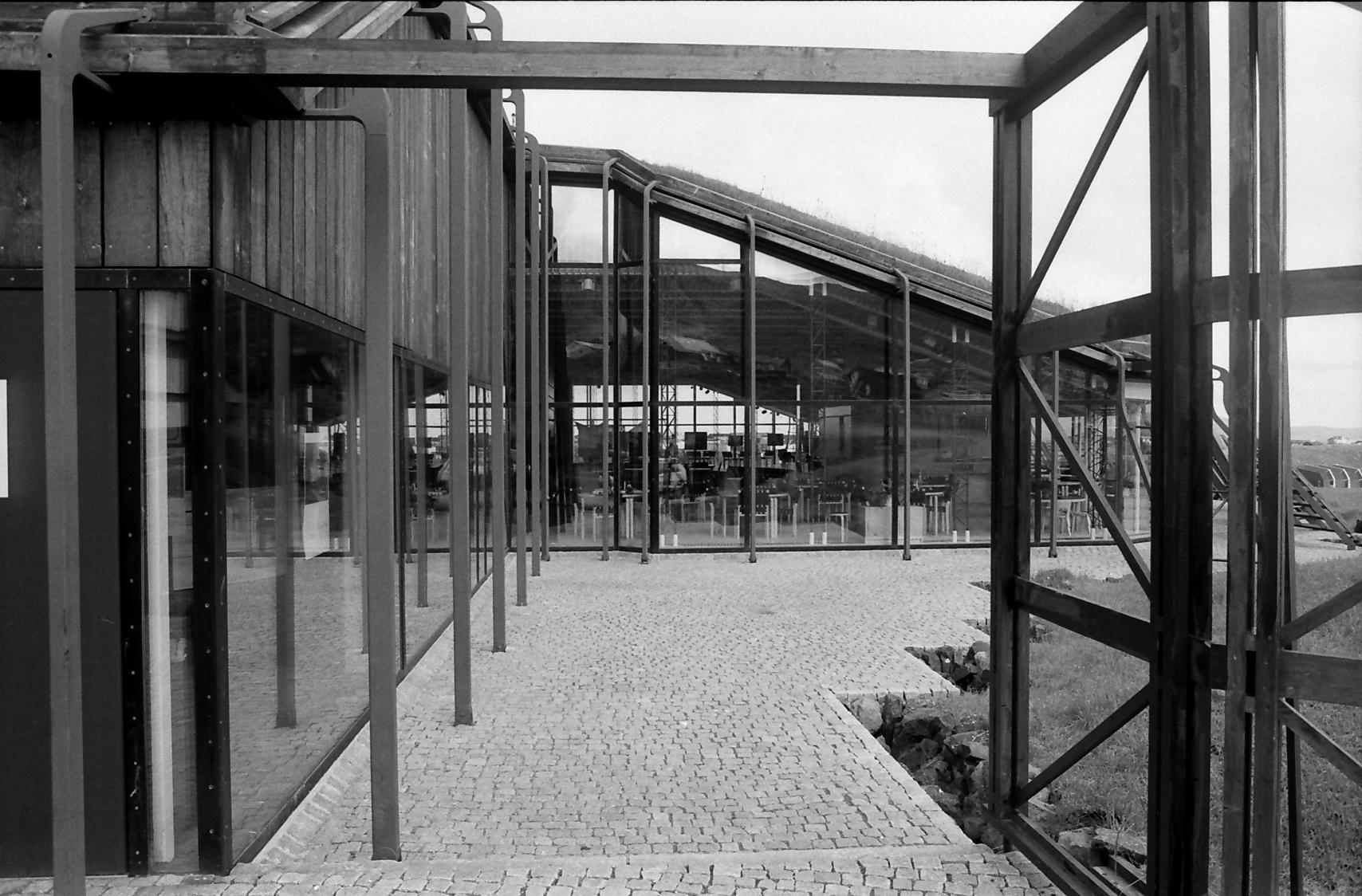
Nordic House

”The combination of a national cultural center and a center to impact culture between the Faroe Islands and other Nordic countries” was the brief for Ola Steen who designed the Nordic House.

In concept, it is green with dragon-like steel struts to provide stability against the strain that the hurricane winds often place on the 2000 m^{2} turf-covered roof. Inside the building, there is a large lobby space that can house a number of simultaneous activities. There is a café and a recessed amphitheater. Exhibitions are organized here as well as cultural events. The public areas can be subdivided or combined with light, sound, and space-defining elements. All of the rooms are daylit except for the 800 m^{2} hall, which can be opened to the amphitheater and lobby, as the west end wall consists of movable elements. The bearing element in structure and space is the high in-cast concrete wall in the large hall. Everything rests on it or relates to it. The large span of steel structure emanating from this wall gives space in the lobby for the organic, snakelike, and supple stairs and ramp.

== Materials ==
The materials used at the Nordic House come from all over Scandinavia. In the lobby and on the ramps is Norwegian slate from Gudbrandsdal. The wood flooring is Swedish pine. Ceilings in the hall and amphitheater are of Danish ash, and all doors and veneered furnishings are of Finnish birch, with Danish brass fittings. All the exterior materials originated from the Faroe Islands or were produced on the Islands except for the glass and anodized aluminum facades, which are Danish.

== Some significant annual events ==
- North Atlantic Music Event (exclusive Faroese bi-yearly showcase)
- Prix Føroyar 1995-2005 (a bi-annual music competition)
- The New Year Concert (with the Faroese Symphony Orchestra)
- The Sommerexhibition (features Faroese artists)

== Exhibitions ==
Its exhibition program has featured acclaimed artists from across the Nordic region, including Icelandic artist Ragnar Kjartansson (2019), Finnish artist Elina Brotherus (2021), and the Swedish artists Christoph Mügge and Sebastian Mügge (2024).

== Bibliography ==
- Red. Kim Dirchinck-Holmfeld et al. 1996. Færøsk arkitektur (Architecture on the Faroe Islands). Arkitektens forlag.
