= Vijfhuizen =

- Village
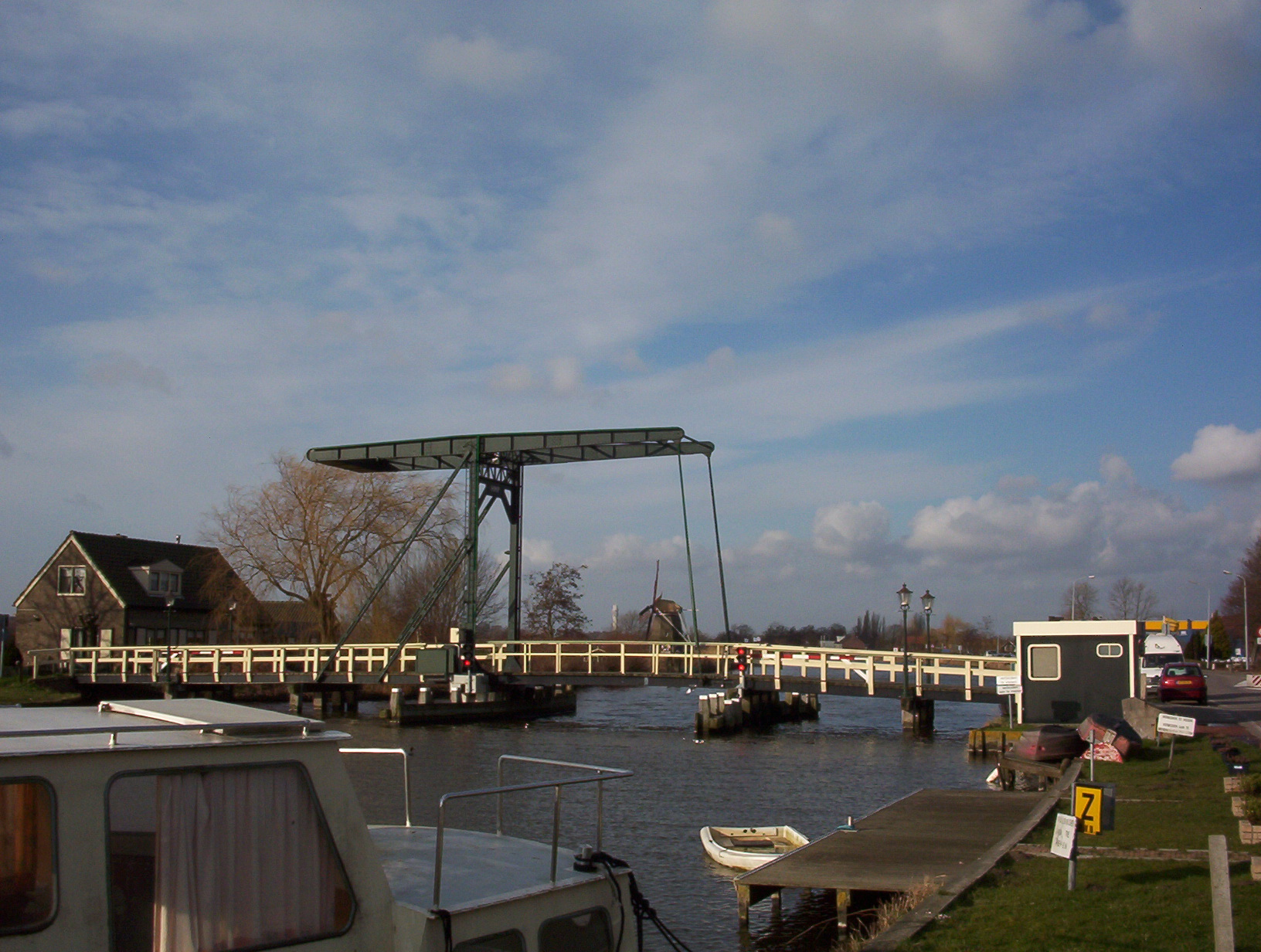
- Vijfhuizen bridge over the ringvaart

- Location in the Netherlands Location in the province of North Holland in the Netherlands
- Coordinates: 52°21′N 4°41′E
- Country: Netherlands
- Province: North Holland
- Municipality: Haarlemmermeer

Area
  - Total: 12.31 km^{2} (4.75 sq mi)
- Elevation: −3.5 m (−11 ft)

Population (2021)
  - Total: 4,840
  - Density: 393/km^{2} (1,020/sq mi)
- Time zone: UTC+1 (CET)
  - Summer (DST): UTC+2 (CEST)
- Postal code: 2141
- Dialing code: 023

Vijfhuizen is a village in the Dutch province of North Holland. It is a part of the municipality of Haarlemmermeer, and lies about 4 km southeast of Haarlem. In January 2011, the town of Vijfhuizen had 4387 inhabitants. The built-up area of the town was 0.48 km^{2}, and contained 728 residences. The wider statistical area of Vijfhuizen has a population of around 2800.

Vijfhuizen is located on the northwest side of the Haarlemmermeer on the ring canal opposite Haarlem. To the south of it lies Cruquius, and to the north, on the ring dike, Nieuwebrug. The characteristic Vijfhuizen bridge connects the village with Haarlem and was completely renewed a few years ago. For a number of years there has been a cycle path along the Geniedijk to Hoofddorp. The roads east of the village run dead on the Polderbaan of Schiphol.

== Monuments and parks ==
- Fort Vijfhuizen is part of the Stelling van Amsterdam and a World Heritage Site. It is currently home to a charitable foundation run by volunteers with 12 art studios and a restaurant.
- Vijfhuizen bridge.
- Flight MH17 monument located in Park Vijfhuizen. A large monument with a tree for every victim of the plane crash. It holds space for families of victims to come together and hold a memorial every year.

== Notable people ==
Danny Kroes (born 1999), racing driver

== The village ==
Initially, Vijfhuizen was a ribbon-developed dike village, but with time the old village has been enclosed by various districts and neighborhoods: Mient, Nes, Baarsjes and Stellinghof. The latter is one of the Haarlemmermeer Vinex districts and is characterized by special architecture.

To the north of Vijfhuizen, on the old land is located the Stokman duck decoy, and to the south are the fort of Vijfhuizen and the Kunstfort center for contemporary art (part of the Defense Line of Amsterdam). The Floriade site is also located on the south side, where the world horticultural exhibition of the same name was held in 2002. This area is also the stage of the annual dance festival Mysteryland. The Groene Weelde park is also located south of the village.

Vijfhuizen has a business association, an active village association, a neighborhood council in Stellinghof, a party week committee and an orange committee. There are two youth associations for young people: the Spiering and the Jungle. Vijfhuizen has two churches: the Roman Catholic Saint Augustine Church and the Protestant Covenant Church. Until 2020 the village had two schools, a public school "the Waterwolf" and an interdenominational school "the Tweemaster". The latter arose as a fusion between the Catholic school and the Protestant Christian school. The schools were small in size and are located next to each other in the same building. Most children were on "the Tweemaster". The Waterwolf and the Tweemaster fused together into one larger school of approximately 500 students and goes by the name "de Vijfsprong"

The N205 (Drie Merenweg (Three Lakes Road)) runs past Vijfhuizen and there is an R-net stop in the Stellinghof district on the route between Haarlem and Hoofddorp. Between the Stellinghof district and the N205 is the former Floriade building that will accommodate the Expo Haarlemmermeer as of 1 February 2009. The Expo has its own R-net stop. Between 3 August 1912 and 31 December 1935, Vijfhuizen had a station on the Aalsmeer – Haarlem railway of the Haarlemmermeer railways. The old station building is still there.

== History ==
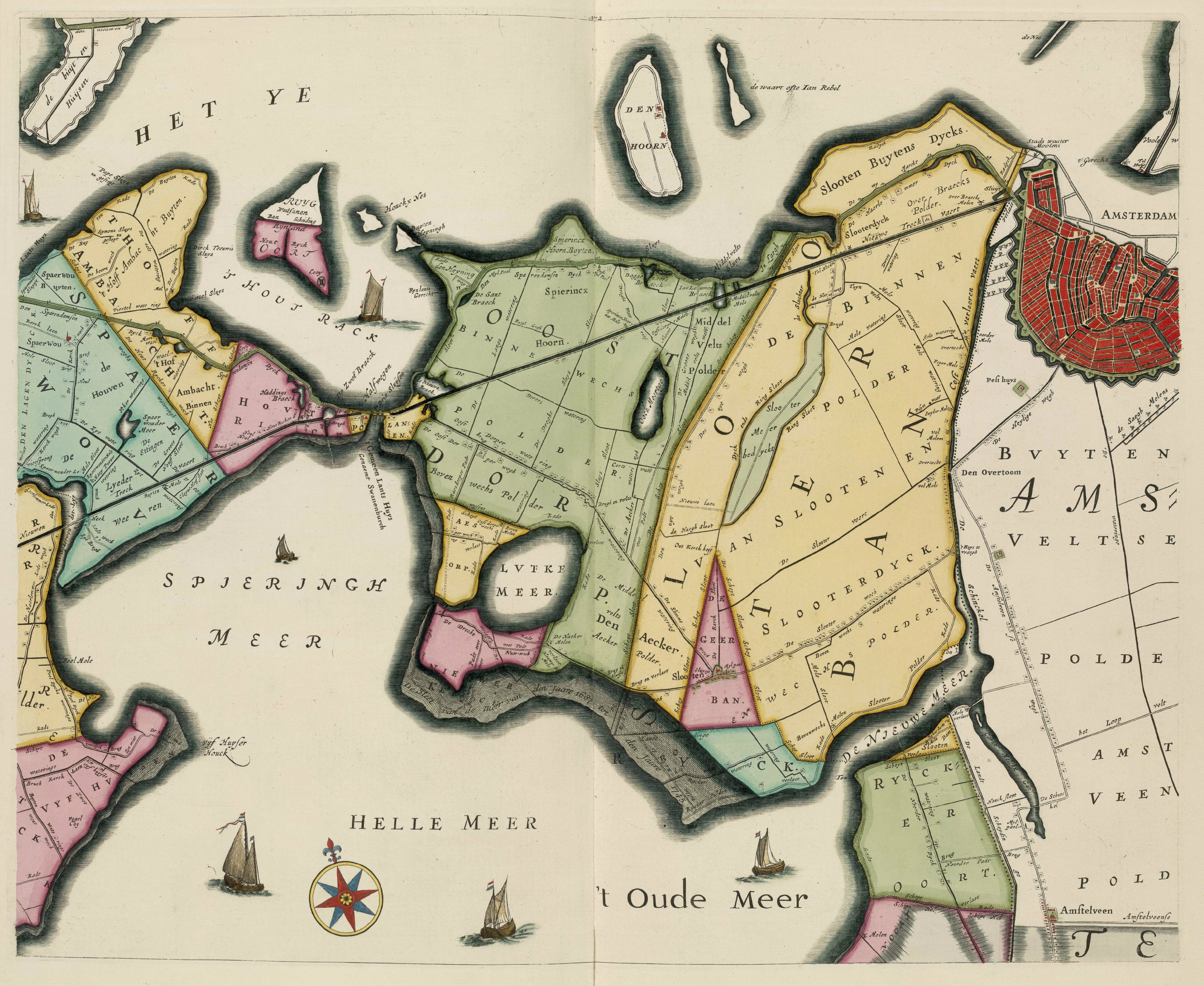
Map of part of the Rijnland Water Board from 1746. Vijfhuizen was located near the headland, on the left on the separation of the Spieringhmeer and the Haarlemmermeer.

Vijfhuizen already existed before the reclamation of the Haarlemmermeer lake. In the Middle Ages, the village was situated along the main route from Haarlem to Amsterdam. Vijfhuizen stretched from Haarlem to halfway through Nieuwerkerk, where the villagers went to church. To the north of Vijfhuizen was the Spieringmeer lake and to the south - the Haarlemmermeer lake. The land bridge between the lakes was swept away in 1508 by further flooding and bank erosion and what remained was a headland with a polder behind it.

Until the reclamation of the Haarlemmermeer, Vijfhuizen held out against the "Waterwolf" (nickname of the Haarlemmermeer). The village was cut in two by the ring canal and Vijfhuizen came to lie as a piece of old land within the new polder. The street Kromme Spieringweg runs over the dike that has protected Vijfhuizen until the reclamation on the south side. After the reclamation, the first church service in the polder was on 22 January 1853 in an emergency church near Vijfhuizen.

== Photos ==
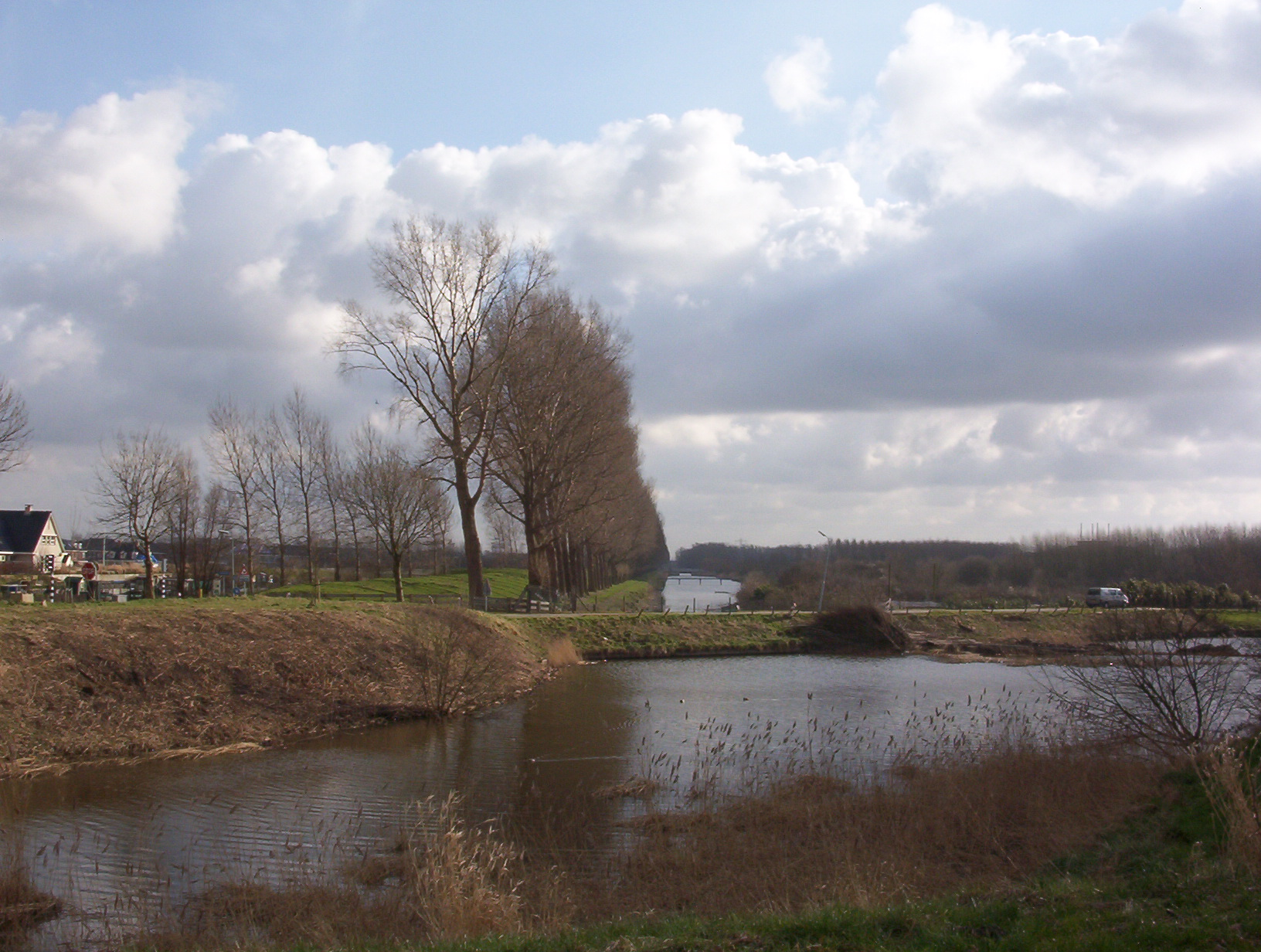
View of the Geniedijk dike, southern border of Vijfhuizen

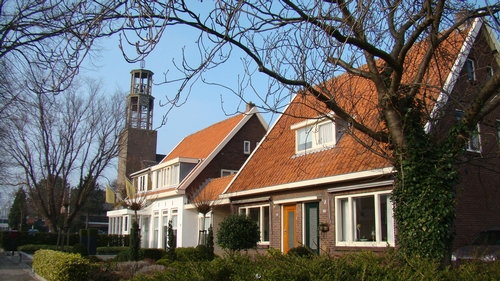
Vijfhuizen

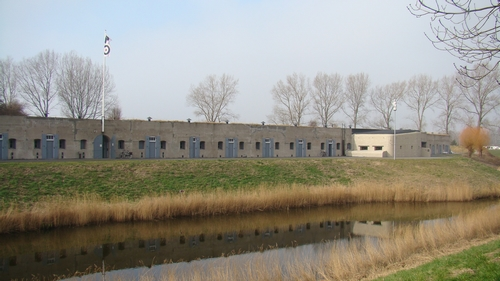
Fort Vijfhuizen

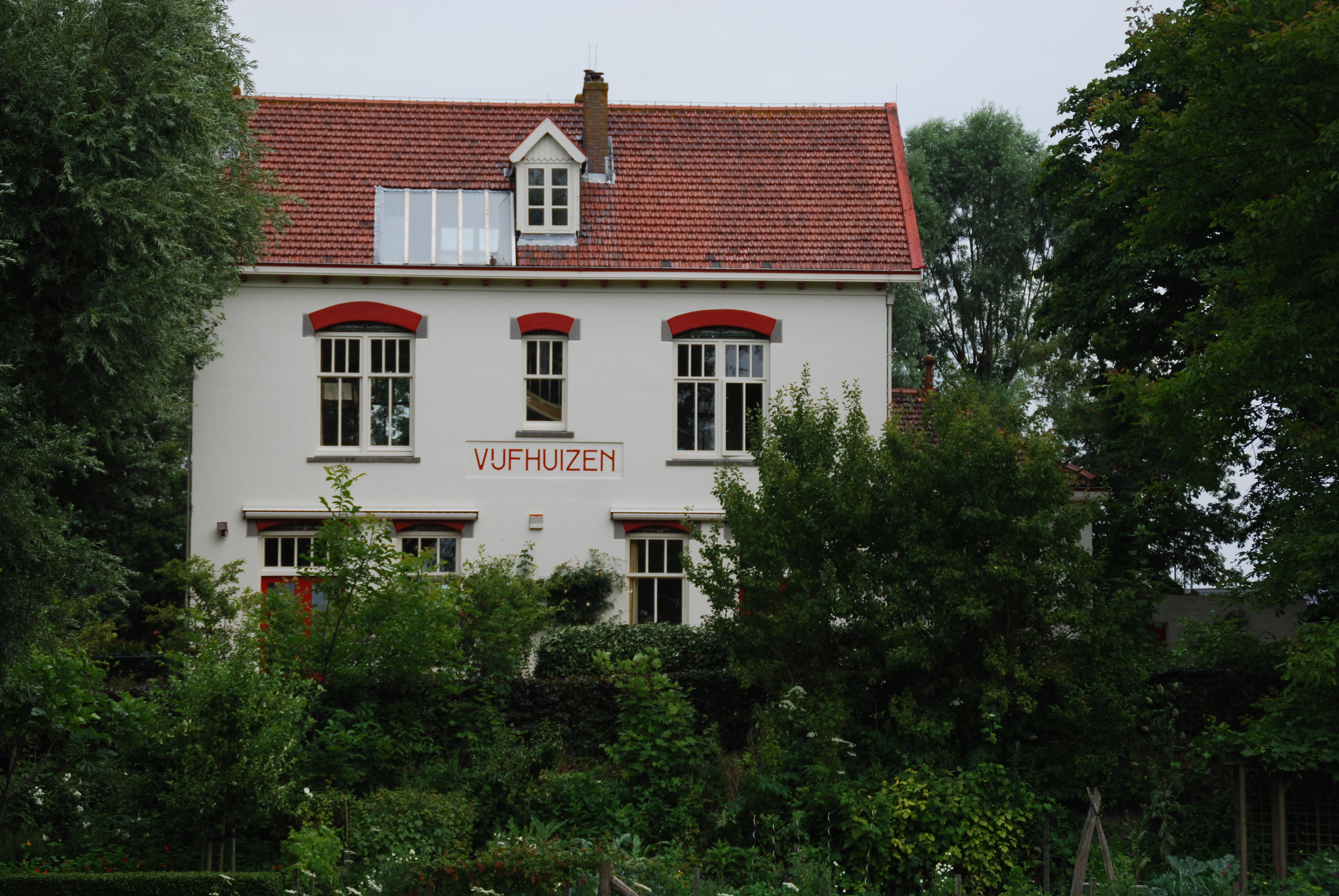
Station Vijfhuizen

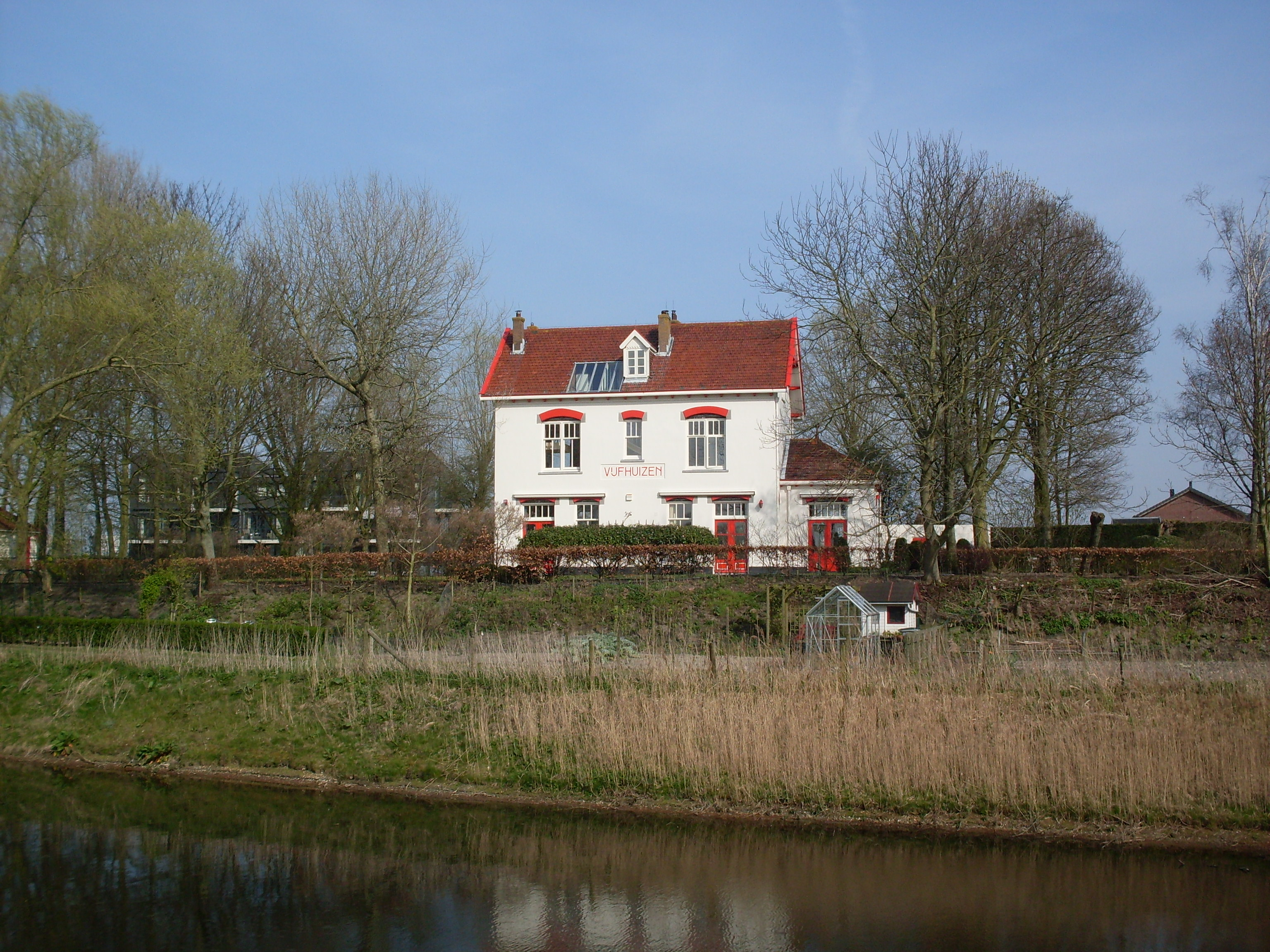
Station Vijfhuizen

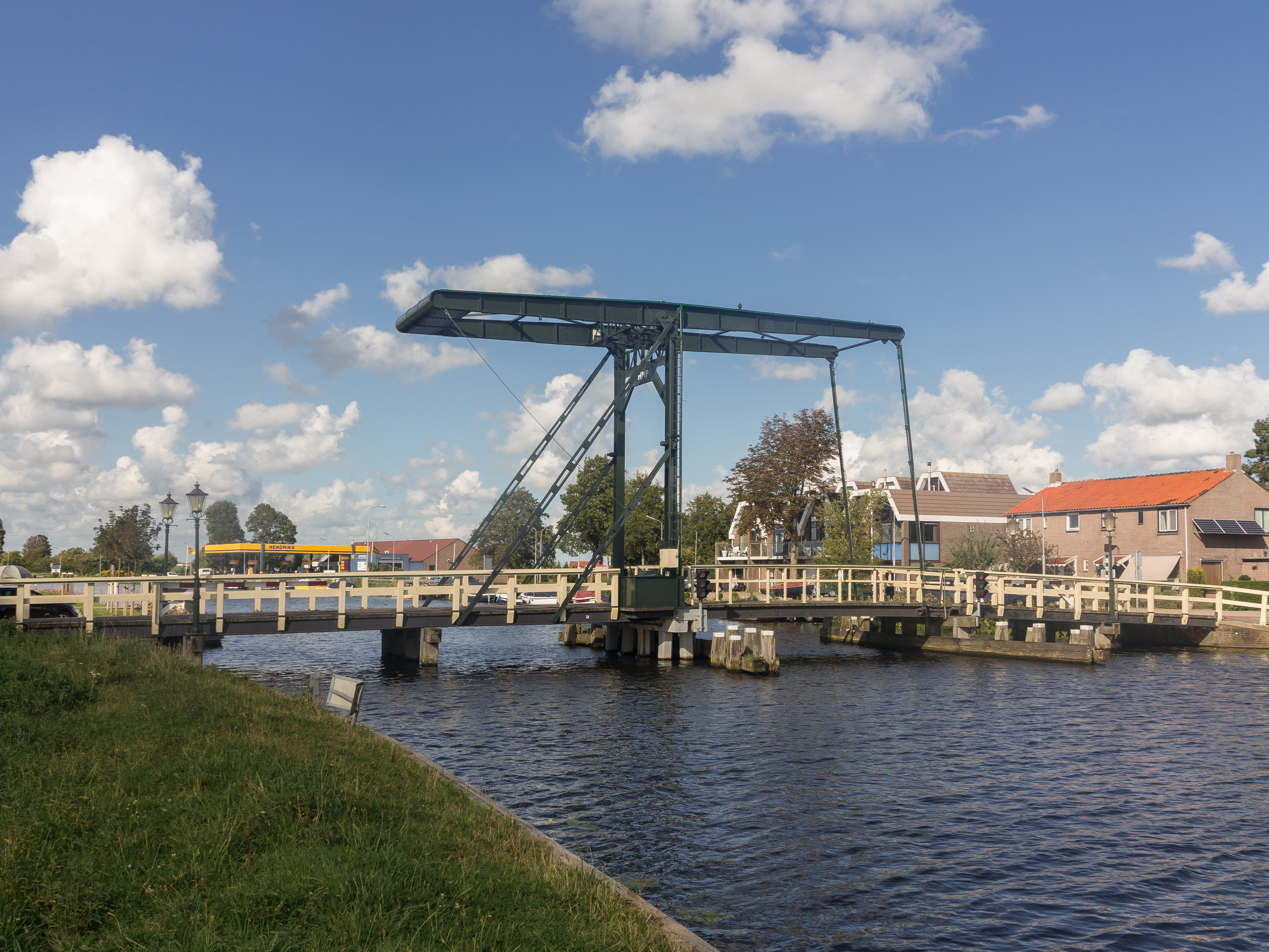
Vijfhuizen bridge
