= Niels Bohr Institute =

Scientific research institute

Coordinates: 55°41′49″N 12°34′18″E

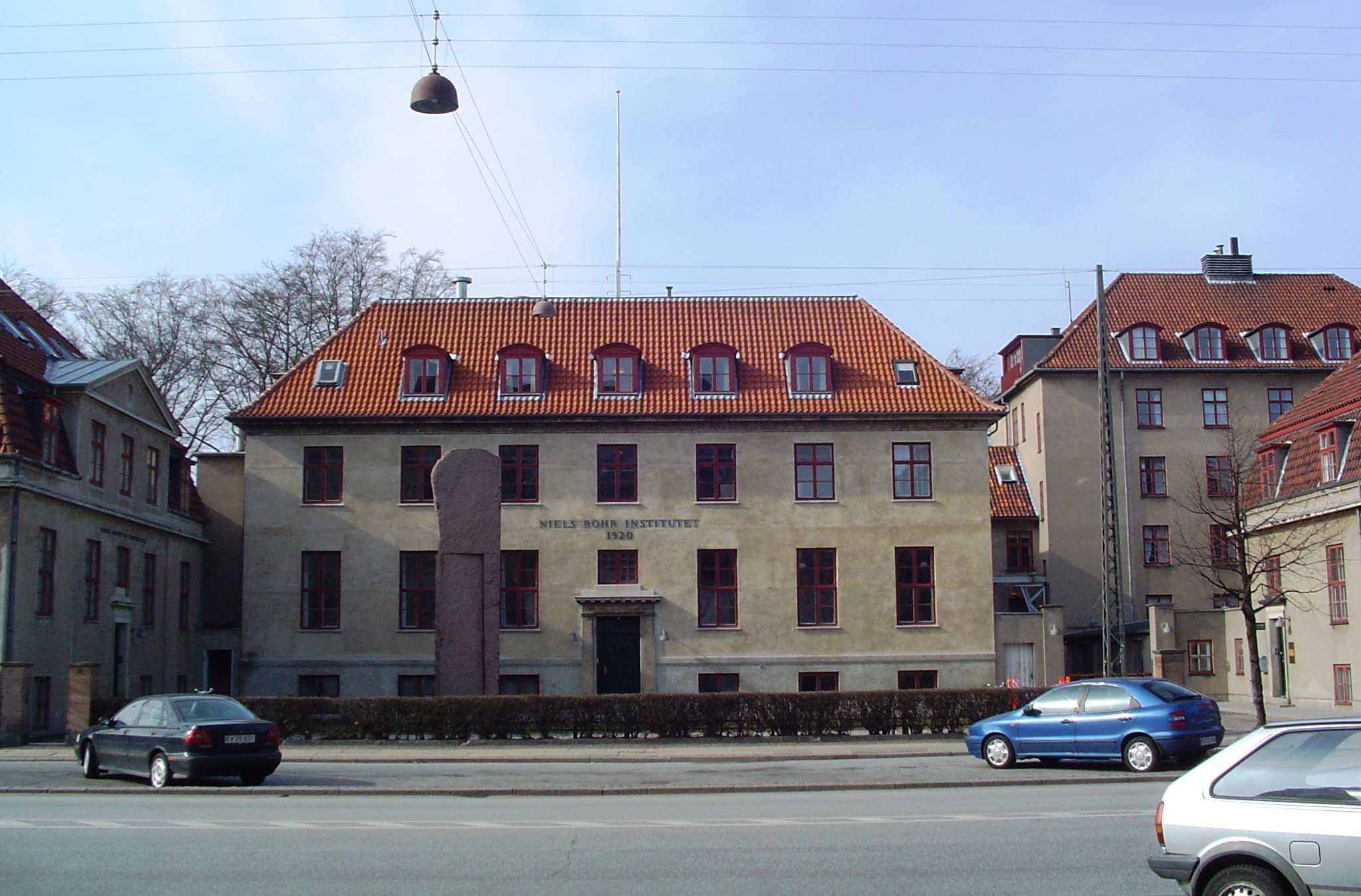
The Niels Bohr Institute in 2005

The Niels Bohr Institute (Danish: Niels Bohr Institutet) is a research institute of the University of Copenhagen, founded in 1921 by its namesake Niels Bohr. Started as an institute of theoretical physics, it has since expanded to span research in astronomy, geophysics, nanotechnology, particle physics, quantum mechanics, and biophysics, along with the Cosmic Dawn Center dedicated to research in cosmology.

== Overview ==
The institute was founded in 1921, as the Institute for Theoretical Physics of the University of Copenhagen, by the Danish theoretical physicist Niels Bohr, who had been on the staff of the University of Copenhagen since 1914, and who had been lobbying for its creation since his appointment as professor in 1916. On the 80th anniversary of Niels Bohr's birth – October 7, 1965 – the Institute officially became the Niels Bohr Institute. Much of its original funding came from the charitable foundation of the Carlsberg brewery, and later from the Rockefeller Foundation.

During the 1920s, and 1930s, the institute was the center of the developing disciplines of atomic physics and quantum physics. Physicists from across Europe (and sometimes further abroad) often visited the institute to confer with Bohr on new theories and discoveries. The Copenhagen interpretation of quantum mechanics is named after work done at the institute during this time.

Following his father's death in 1962, Aage Bohr succeeded him as director of the Niels Bohr Institute, a position he held until 1970. He remained active there until he retired in 1992.

On January 1, 1993, the institute was merged with the Astronomic Observatory, the Ørsted Laboratory and the Geophysical Institute. The new resulting institute retained the name Niels Bohr Institute.

A new building was erected on Jagtvej to house the Niels Bohr institute in 2024, where it now resides alongside the Department of Chemistry.

== Research sections ==
The research at the Niels Bohr Institute spans Astronomy, Geophysics, Nanophysics, Particles Physics, Quantum Physics and Biophysics.

Research at the institute is based on observations, fieldwork, laboratory experiments and theoretical models for the purpose of understanding basic laws and complex truths about the universe. The Institute has a broad network of scientific cooperation, and regularly exchanges collaborators and guests with international research groups.

=== Astrophysics ===
A broad spectrum of astronomy and astrophysics is researched at the Niels Bohr Institute – everything from the visible Universe such as planets, stars and galaxies – to the invisible universe and the presence of dark energy and dark matter.

The NBI astrophysicists participate in many international projects and have access to modern telescopes and satellites via, e.g. Denmark’s membership of the European Southern Observatory (ESO) and the European Space Agency (ESA), and to state-of-the-art supercomputers.

=== Biocomplexity and Biophysics ===
Biocomplexity is a cutting-edge area of research between physics and biology. By using the principles and methods of physics one can explore the living nature and biological phenomena.

Researchers at BioComplexity continuously explore the diversity of complex phenomena in biological, physical and social systems, including pattern formation, complex and chaotic dynamics, fluid dynamics, game theory, networks and econophysics.

Physics approaches are used to suggest and perform experiments and models of living systems. The systems range from proteins and gene regulation to larger-scale collective spatiotemporal structure formation. The research at the institute is often performed as a collaboration between physicists, biologists, medical doctors, and nanoscientists.

=== Condensed Matter Physics ===
Condensed matter physics is concerned with the understanding of the physical properties of solids and liquids, both naturally occurring and artificially produced.

Condensed matter physics is the foundation for many every-day technologies, ranging from hardening of steel to integrated microchips. Modern research in condensed matter physics takes place in both large scale x-ray and neutron scattering facilities, as well as in locally based laboratories, where quantum phenomena are being explored at temperatures near absolute zero. There is a vivid exchange between condensed matter and neighboring research areas, including biophysics, nanoscience, chemistry, optics, and quantum information.

=== Experimental Particle Physics ===
How was the universe created, which inflation scenario played out in the first split second, what happened during the quark-gluon plasma era? What is the source of the mass spectrum of fundamental particles of matter and forces? These are some of the questions particle physicists are looking for answers to.

The Particle Physicists work with the build up of matter in the early universe. They are searching for an explanation as to what the universe's smallest components were composed of in the first milliseconds after the Big Bang 14 billion years ago and what forces held them together.

=== Physics of Ice, Climate and Earth ===
The section for the Physics of Ice, Climate and Earth at the Niels Bohr Institute studies the elements of the Earth and climate system – the atmosphere, oceans, ice sheets and glaciers, sea ice, and the solid Earth itself – and the interactions between them.

=== Quantum Optics and Photonics ===
The Quantum Optics section conducts experimental and theoretical research in Quantum Optics, in particular, in Quantum Information Processing, Quantum Sensors, and Quantum Technologies.

We use photons, from optics to microwaves interacting with a wide variety of quantum matter, such as quantum dots, single atoms, atomic ensembles and mechanical oscillators.

The overarching theme is generation and manipulation of non-classical entangled states for quantum simulation, sensing and communication. The research directions span from fundamental research to device engineering.

=== Theoretical high energy, astroparticle and gravitational physics ===
The Theoretical high energy, astroparticle and gravitational physics at the Niels Bohr Institute is involved in a wide scope of research activities centered around quantum theories of gauge fields, gravity and astrophysics.

Research areas include scattering amplitudes, effective field theory, black holes, holography, lattice simulations, quantum gravity, integrability, astroparticle physics, and cosmology.

== Research centres ==
=== Cosmic Dawn ===
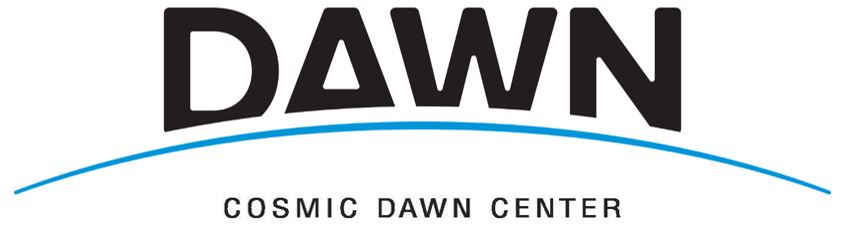
Logo of the Cosmic Dawn Center

The Cosmic Dawn Center is an Astronomy/Cosmology research center, founded as a collaboration between the University of Copenhagen and DTU Space of the Danish Technical University (DTU). The center is led by center director and NBI Professor Sune Toft and center co-director Thomas Greve, Professor at DTU and UCL. The main objective of the center is to investigate the period known as the Cosmic Dawn (the transition period following the Cosmic Dark Ages), i.e. the reionization of the Universe and the formation of the first galaxies, through observations as well as through theory and simulations.

==== Goals ====
Research conducted at the center is focused on the specific period in the history of the Universe known as the Cosmic Dawn. This largely unexplored period, 300-600 million years after the Big Bang is when the first stars, black holes, and galaxies are believed to have formed. Many of the observations used by the center originate from the Atacama Large Millimeter Array (ALMA), one of the more powerful telescopes in the world. In the future, the center aims to mainly use the James Webb Space Telescope and the Euclid Telescope of the European Space Agency (ESA). DAWN scientists were instrumental in the construction of three instruments (NIRSpec, MIRI and NIRISS) for the project, and will be involved in the analysis of the first data from the telescope.

==== Published research ====
As of April 18, 2020, DAWN authors have published at least 187 refereed papers garnering 1602 citations, which, among others, can be found at the NASA/ADS library.

- Observation of inverse Compton emission from a long γ-ray burst:
- Identification of strontium in the merger of two neutron stars:
- Signatures of a jet cocoon in early spectra of a supernova associated with a γ-ray burst:
- Stellar Velocity Dispersion of a Massive Quenching Galaxy at z = 4.01:

== Medal of Honour ==
in 2010, the year of the 125th anniversary of the birth of Niels Bohr, the institute established the Niels Bohr Institute Medal of Honour. It is an annual award for "a particularly outstanding researcher who is working in the spirit of Niels Bohr: International cooperation and the exchange of knowledge".

The medal is made by Danish sculptor Rikke Raben for the Niels Bohr Institute. On the front is a portrait of Niels Bohr, the atom sign and stars. The illustration on the back is inspired by a quote from Bohr:

What is it that we human beings ultimately depend on? We depend on our words. We are suspended in language. Our task is to communicate experience and ideas to others.

On the back of the medal: "Unity of Knowledge" – the title of a lecture given by Bohr at Columbia University in 1954. Nosce te ipsum is Latin and means "know thyself". This phrase is a translation of an famous inscription at the Temple of Apollo in Greece.

Recipients:

- 2010: Leo Kadanoff
- 2011: Andre Geim
- 2012: Juan Ignacio Cirac Sasturain
- 2013: Fabiola Gianotti
- 2014: Glaciologist Jérôme Chappellaz
- 2015: Astrophysicist Brian Schmidt
- 2016: Gerard 't Hooft
- 2017: Jürgen Schukraft
- 2019: David R. Nelson
- 2020: Paul J. Steinhardt
- 2021: Jun Ye

== See also ==
- Niels Bohr
- Nano-Science Center (Copenhagen University)
- Institute for Theoretical Physics (disambiguation)
- Center for Theoretical Physics (disambiguation)
- List of physics awards
