= Soon =

Soon may refer to:

== Music ==
- Soon (musical), a 1971 rock opera by Joseph M. Kookolis and Scott Fagan

=== Albums ===
- Soon (album), a 1993 album by Tanya Tucker, and the title song (see below)
- Soon (EP), a 1997 EP by Far

=== Songs ===
- "Soon" (1927 song), from the musical Strike Up the Band
- "Soon" (Tanya Tucker song), 1993
- "Soon", by Dexys Midnight Runners from BBC Radio One Live in Concert
- "Soon", by LeAnn Rimes from I Need You
- "Soon (My Bloody Valentine song)", by My Bloody Valentine from Glider and Loveless
- "Soon", by Yes from The Gates of Delirium
- "Soon", from the 1935 film Mississippi
- "Soon", from the 1964 musical Bajour
- "Soon (I Like It)", by Imani Coppola from Chupacabra
- "Soon", by U2, used as the introduction music for shows during their 360° Tour

== People with the surname ==
- Sun (surname) or Soon, a transliteration of a common Chinese surname
- Lyndel Soon (born 1978), Malaysian pageant contestant and actress
- Willie Soon (born 1966), American astrophysicist
