= Sune Toft =

Physicist

- Education: University of Copenhagen
- Known for: Cosmology, Galaxy Evolution
- Scientific career
- Fields: Astronomy, Cosmology
- Workplaces: University of Copenhagen; Cosmic Dawn Center
- Doctoral advisor: Jens Hjorth

Sune Toft is a professor of Cosmology and Extragalactic Astrophysics at the Niels Bohr Institute. His research focuses on understanding the cosmic origin and evolution of galaxies.

== Early education ==
Sune Toft was educated through the Danish education system, earning his bachelor's degree in physics in 1998 at the University of Copenhagen, and his master's degree in 2000, and his PhD with a thesis titled High Redshift Clusters of Galaxies in 2003, both from the Niels Bohr Institute, under the supervision of Jens Hjorth.

== Scientific career ==
Toft is currently the Director of the Cosmic Dawn Center. He was previously at Yale University as a postdoctoral research associate with Pieter van Dokkum from 2004 to 2006, and an independent ESO fellow at the European Southern Observatory headquarters in Garching, Germany from 2007 to 2009.
