= Sebastian Mügge =

German–Swedish contemporary artist

- Born: 1981 (age 44–45); Bonn, Germany
- Education: MFA, Umeå Academy of Fine Arts, 2011
- Known for: Contemporary art, drawing, collage, sculpture, installation, site-specific work
- Movement: Contemporary art
- Website: http://www.sebastianmuegge.com

Sebastian Mügge (born 1981) is a German–Swedish contemporary artist based in Kristianstad, Sweden, working in drawing and installation. His site-specific practice often incorporates found materials, archival sources, and local histories. Since 2017, he has worked collaboratively with his brother, Christoph Mügge.

== Early life and education ==
Mügge was born in Bonn, Germany, in 1981. He earned a Master of Fine Arts (MFA) at the Umeå Academy of Fine Arts in 2011.

== Artistic practice ==
Mügge works across drawing and sculptural installation, often combining media in projects exploring memory, identity, material culture, and societal documentation of everyday life. His installations frequently incorporate found and locally sourced objects, responding to the architectural or social context of the venue. Since 2017, he has worked primarily in collaboration with his brother, Christoph Mügge, beginning with the joint installation Det stora soprumsnöjet at Kristianstads konsthall.

== Selected duo exhibitions with Christoph Mügge ==
- 2025 – Traumatic Trash Pizza, Spazio Contemporanea, Brescia, Italy.
- 2024 – Lost Library Legends, Rundetårn, Copenhagen, Denmark.
- 2024 – Circular Faroe Tales, The Nordic House, Tórshavn, Faroe Islands.
- 2021 – Depot oder Deponie, DG Kunstraum, Munich, Germany.
- 2019 – Do With Less – So They’ll Have Enough!, The Koppel Project Hive, London, United Kingdom.
- 2018 – Viktigt meddelande till allmänheten, Södertälje konsthall, Södertälje, Sweden.
- 2017 – Det stora soprumsnöjet, Kristianstads konsthall, Kristianstad, Sweden.

== Selected solo exhibitions ==
- 2022 – Känn ingen sorg för Insta hoarder #Trelleborg!, Trelleborgs Museum, Trelleborg, Sweden.
- 2022 – Someone's Gotta Draw the Line Somewhere in Sogn og Fjordane!, Sogn og Fjordane Kunstmuseum, Førde, Norway.
- 2022 – Un paysage géant à déguster les yeux mi‑clos, Vaste et Vague, Carleton-sur-Mer, Canada.
- 2021 – Allan & Co with a delicious toilet paper roll, please!, Ebelingmuseet, Torshälla, Sweden.
- 2021 – Vill du förfesta med oss?, Sundsvalls Museum, Sundsvall, Sweden.
- 2019 – Nässjö med extra allt, tack!, Nässjö Konsthall, Nässjö, Sweden.

== Selected group exhibitions ==
- 2025 – Shame of the Shuffled Cards, Kunstfort Vijfhuizen, Vijfhuizen, Netherlands.
- 2022 – Der Bau. Hommage an Kafka, Museum Villa Rot, Burgrieden, Germany.
- 2020 – NOK?, Viborg Kunsthal, Denmark.
- 2019 – Open ART Biennale, Örebro, Sweden.
- 2019 – International Symposium of Contemporary Art of Baie‑Saint‑Paul, Baie‑Saint‑Paul, Canada.
- 2014 – Homeland, Kuntsi Museum of Modern Art, Vaasa, Finland.
- 2013 – Survival Kit 5: Slow Revolution, Riga, Latvia.
- 2013 – Om revolutionen kommer, Kalmar Konstmuseum, Kalmar, Sweden.
- 2011 – 13, Bildmuseet, Umeå, Sweden.
- 2007 – Street / Art, Kunsthistorisches Institut der Universität Bonn, Bonn, Germany.

== Biennials and triennials ==
- 2023 – Rauma Triennale, Finland.
- 2021 – Ostrale Biennale, Dresden, Germany.

== Selected awards and grants ==
- 2024–2025 – Working Grant, Konstnärsnämnden (Swedish Arts Grants Committee).
- 2023 – Lengertz Art Prize.
- 2019 – Region Västerbottens bildkonststipendium.
- 2016 – Ester Lindahl Grant.
- 2014 – Sparbanksstiftelsen Norrlands Konstnärsstipendium.
- 2012 – Höga Kusten‑stipendiet.
- 2011 – Stiftelsen Ann‑Margret Lindells Stipendiefond.

== Collections ==
Mügge's works are held in public collections, including Västerbottens Museum.

== Selected publications ==
- Depot oder Deponie (publication for the exhibition with Christoph Mügge, 2022).
