= Waterwolf =

Erosion of peat lakeshores

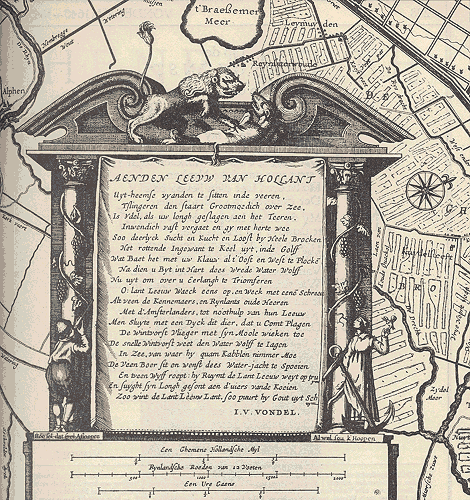
Detail of a map by Jacob Bartelz Veris drawn in 1641 of the Haarlem Lake, with a poem by Joost van den Vondel topped by a Dutch Lion fighting the Waterwolf as an allegory of the Dutch struggle against floods

Waterwolf, or Water-wolf is a Dutch word from the Netherlands referring to the tendency of lakes in low lying peaty land, sometimes previously worn-down by men digging peat for fuel, to enlarge or expand by flooding, thus eroding the lake shores, and potentially causing harm to infrastructure, or death. The term waterwolf is an example of zoomorphism, where the traits of a wolf applied to lakes include "something to be feared", "quick and relentless", and "an enemy of man".

The Netherlands, meaning 'low countries', is a nation where 18% of the land is below sea level, and half of the land under one meter above sea level, and is prone to flooding. Before modern flood control, severe storms could cause flooding that could wipe out whole villages in the area of the waterwolf. Much of the land in the Netherlands consists of peat bogs. Peat is organic matter consisting of 10% carbon and 90% water, usually found in colder climates where the plant growth and decay are slow. Peat is considered a form of carbon sequestration, and when dried can be burned as fuel. Historically peat was the primary source of fuel in the Netherlands, and farmers would mine the peat to burn or sell, thus contributing to the erosion of the landscape.

The first great step to reclaiming land taken by the waterwolf was made with the creation of windmills that could pump water out of the surrounding area, allowing for the creation of polders, or areas inhabited below sea level with an artificially managed water table. Modern flood control in the Netherlands consists of maintaining polders and levees, and is highlighted by the world's largest dam project: The Delta Works. While modern flood control has conquered the waterwolf, new events such as rising sea levels from climate change could once again bring the waterwolf.
