= Sune Andersson =

Sune Andersson may refer to:

- Sune Andersson (footballer, born 1921) (1921–2002), Swedish footballer
- Sune Andersson (footballer, born 1898) (1898–1981), Swedish footballer
- Sune Andersson (Malmö FF footballer), Swedish footballer

== Fictional characters ==
- Sune Andersson, the protagonist of the book series Sune
