= UCPH Department of Geosciences and Natural Resource Management =

Department under the Faculty of Science at University of Copenhagen

The UCPH Department of Geosciences and Natural Resource Management (Danish: Institut for Geovidenskab og Naturforvaltning, IGN) is a department under the Faculty of Science at University of Copenhagen (UCPH).

== History ==
In 2007, the Royal Veterinary and Agricultural University, KVL, merged into the University of Copenhagen, becoming the Faculty of Life Sciences. Departments were not changed until 2012, when the Faculty of Life Sciences was split up and merged with the Faculty of Science and the Faculty of Health and Medical Sciences. The merger of faculties also brought along a restructuring and merger of several departments. IGN was newly established out of the main part of the Department for Forest, Landscape and Planning and the Department for Geography and Geology. Both departments have been results of mergers a few years earlier.

The Department of Geography and Geology was established in 2007 by merging the two, former separate departments at the University of Copenhagen. The Department for Forest, Landscape and Planning was established in 2004 by a merger of the former public research institute Forest & Landscape, the Department of Economy, Forest and Landscape at KVL, the Forest and Landscape College and the DANIDA Centre for forest seeds. The brand Forest & Landscape still exists as cross-departmental cooperation.

== Organisation ==
The department is organized into five subsections: Geography; Geology; Forest, Nature and Biomass; Landscape Architecture and Planning; and the Forest and Landscape College.

=== Forest and Landscape College ===
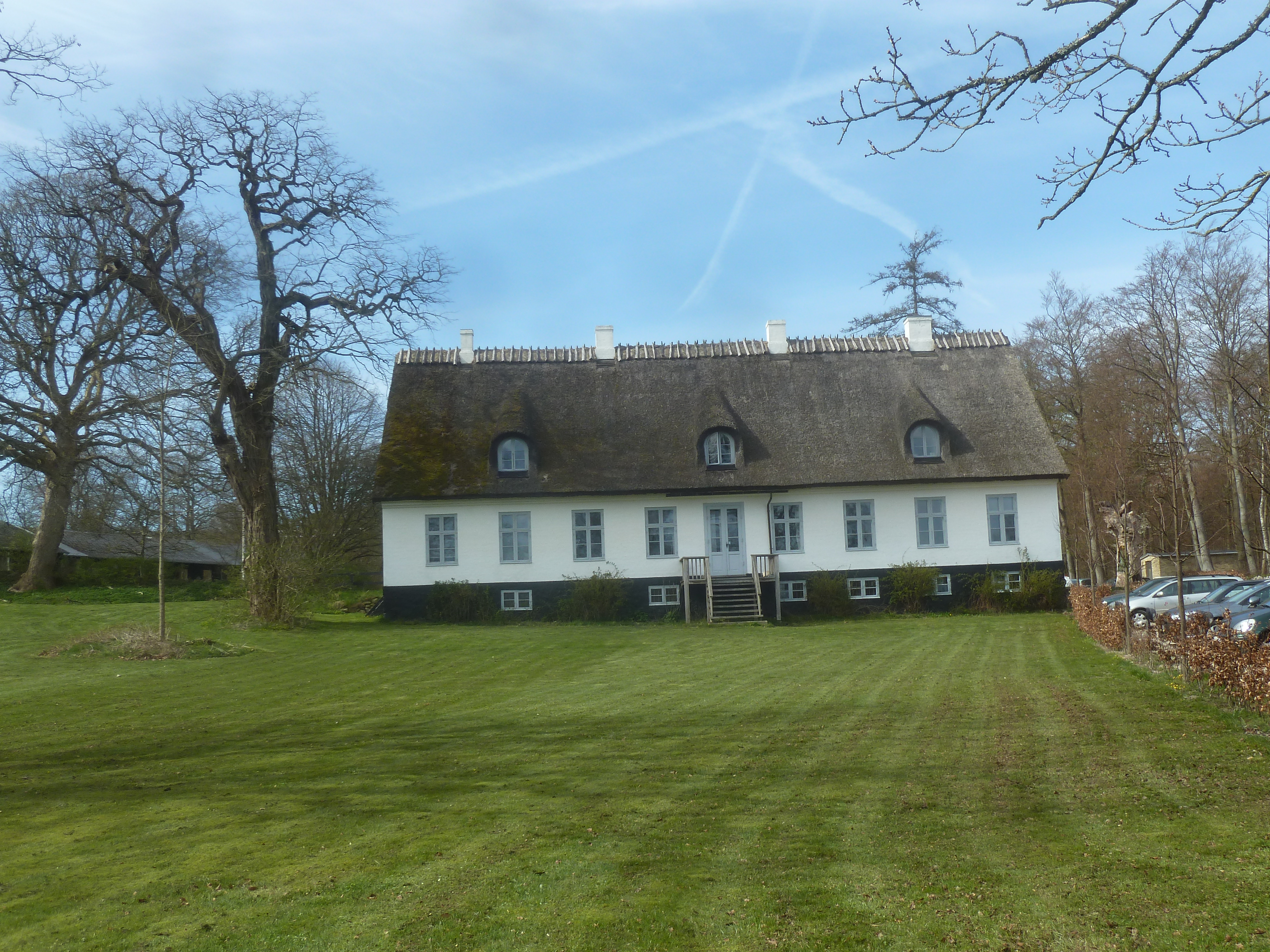
One of Skovridergården's old buildings, now part of the school

The Forest and Landscape College (Danish: Skovskolen) is based in Nødebo in the southern part of Grib Forest, Hillerød Municipality, some 30 km north of Copenhagen, Denmark. It has additional facilities at Eldrupgård in Auning, Djursland.

The college was founded as an independent institution in 1948, as Skovarbejderskolen in Kagerup. It initially offered a four-week programme where mostly experienced forest workers were trained in the use of machine saws and other modern technology. Its original facilities burned down in 1953. The institution then merged with three other forestry schools in 1963 to form Skovskolen in Nødebo, on the grounds of an old forester's residence which dates to c. 1800 and was listed in 1960. Most of the buildings at the Nødebo campus were built in 1982–83 and designed by royal building inspector Gehrdt Bornebusch. It was expanded between 1995 and 1996.

In 2007, the institution became a part of the University of Copenhagen. Today, the Forest and Landscape College occupies a village-like campus of low, black-painted buildings on the northern outskirts of Nødebo. A new building designed by Rørbæk & Møller Arkitekter is expected to be completed in 2016 and will be followed by a new residential building. The students have built various public facilities in the area, including shelters, free cabins and a nature playground. They also arrange various events, including Skovens Dag (The Forrest's Day) and an annual Christmas market.

== Location ==
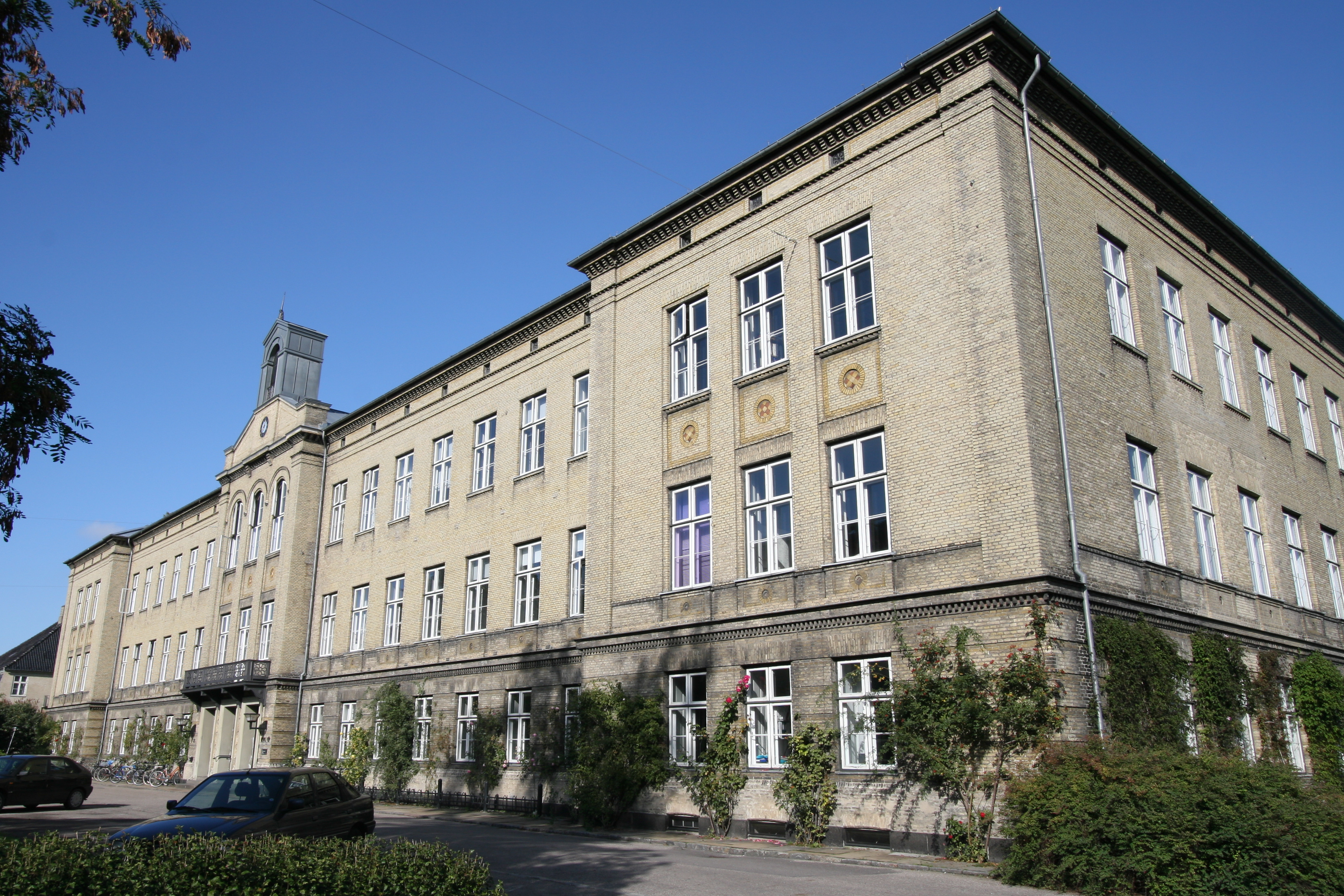
Rolighedsvej 23

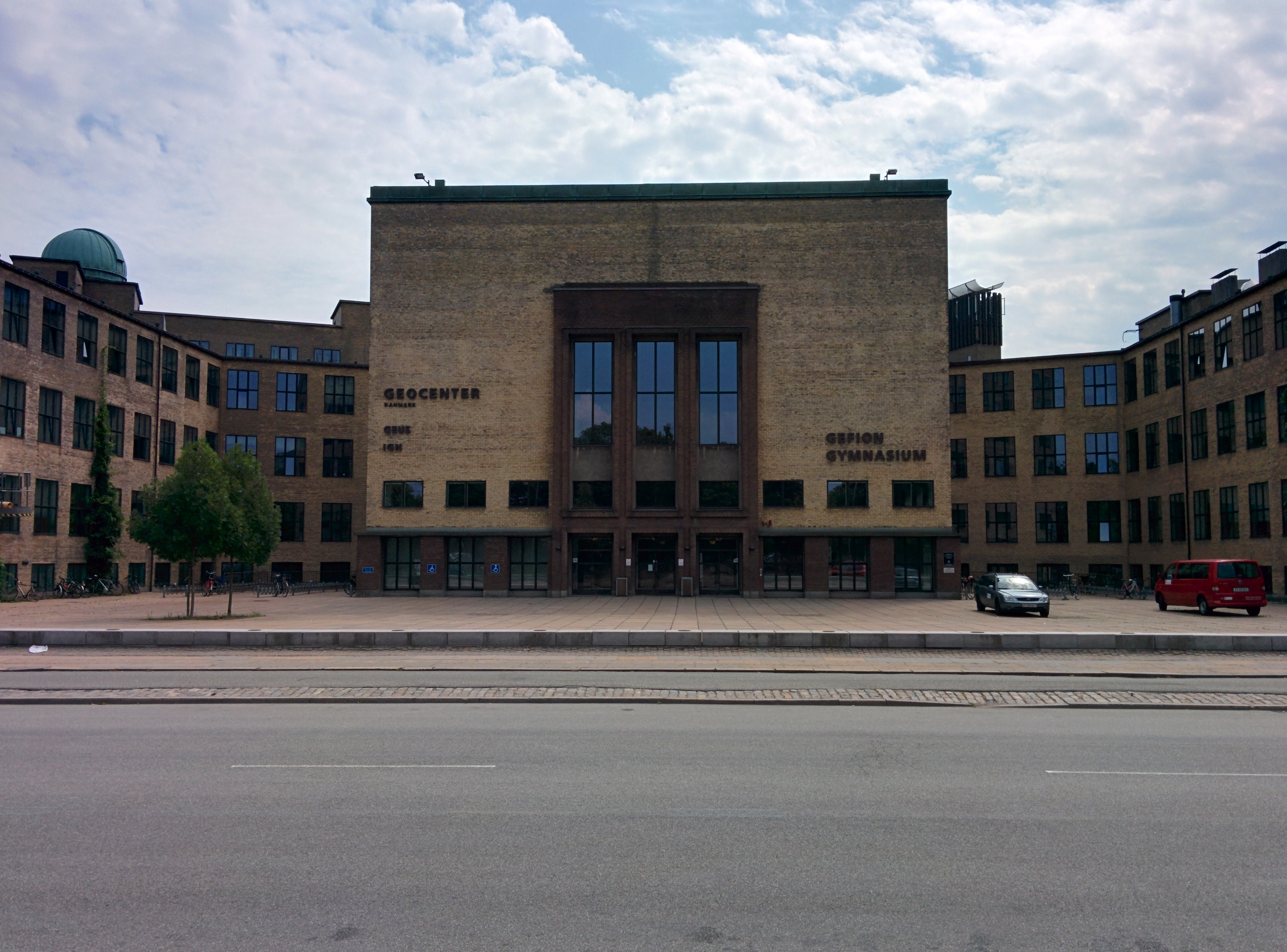
Østervoldgade 10

The department's secretariat as well as the Sections for Landscape Architecture and Planning, Section for Forest, Nature and Biomass are based at Rolighedsvej 23 in the university's Frederiksberg Campus. The site comprises the former building of Københavns Sygehjem as well as a modern extension by Rørbæk & Møller Arkitekter from 2013. The Section for Geography and the Section for Geology are based at Øster Voldgade 10.

== Programmes ==
=== Bachelor´s programmes ===
- Geology–Geoscience (Danish)
- Geography & Geoinformatics (Danish)
- Landscape Architecture (Danish)
- Natural Resources(Danish)

=== Master´s programmes ===
- Geology-Geoscience
- Geography and Geoinformatics
- Landscape Architecture
- Forest and Nature Management
- Agricultural Development
- Environmental and Natural Resource Economics
- Nature Management
  - Climate Change
- Sustainable Forest and Nature Management
  - Sustainable Tropical Forestry

=== Professional bachelor´s programmes ===
- Urban Landscape Engineer
- Forestry and Landscape Engineer

=== Vocational programme ===
- Skilled Forest and Landscape Craftsmen

== Arboreta ==
The department maintains three arboreta, two in Hørsholm and one in Greenland. Hørsholm Arboretum comprises approximately 2,000 species, making it the biggest collection of different trees and bushes in Denmark. The Urban Tree Arboretum is a collection of trees that are traditionally used or hold qualities that make them particularly well suited for use in urban environments. Pruning of different species of trees is systematically executed and their reactions thereto are registered. The Freenlandic Arboretum in Narsarsuaq has an area of 150 hectares and comprises approximately 110 species from about 600 provenances, making it one of the most extensive tree-line arboreta in the world.
