= UCPH School of Veterinary Medicine and Animal Science =

Veterinary school in Copenhagen, Denmark

School of Veterinary Medicine and Animal Science
- Skolen for Veterinærmedicin og Husdyrvidenskab
- Type: Veterinary school
- Established: 2012
- Parent institution: University of Copenhagen
- Director: Birgit Nørrung
- Location: Frederiksberg and Taastrup, Denmark
- Website: vetschool.ku.dk/english/

The UCPH School of Veterinary Medicine and Animal Science (UCPH Vetschool) is part of the Faculty of Health and Medical Sciences at University of Copenhagen (UCPH) in Copenhagen, Denmark. Based at the university's Frederiksberg Campus in Frederiksberg and the Taastrup Campus in the suburb of Taastrup, the school originates in the Royal Veterinary and Agricultural University which was merged into UCPH in 2007. It is the only institution that trains veterinarians in Denmark. The programme is taught in two veterinary teaching hospitals, one at the Frederiksberg Campus and one for large animals in Taastrup.

== History ==
In January 2007, the Royal Veterinary and Agricultural University was merged into the University of Copenhagen and was renamed as the Faculty of Life Sciences. This was later split up, with the veterinary part merging with the Faculty of Health Sciences and the Faculty of Pharmaceutical Sciences to form the Faculty of Health and Medical Sciences and the rest merging into the Faculty of Science.

== Departments ==
- Department of Veterinary and Animal Sciences
- Department of Veterinary Clinical Sciences

== Programmes ==
As of 2015, UCPH Vetschool offers the following programmes:

- Veterinary medicine (Vet) Bachelor and Master
- Animal Science, Bachelor (SCIENCE registration)
- Animal Science, Master
- Biology-Biotechnology, Master (SCIENCE registration)

=== Post-graduate master programmes ===
- Master of Veterinary Public Health
- Master of Companion Animal Clinical Science
- Master of Laboratory Animal Science

=== Summer School and individual courses ===
- One Health International Summer School

== Animal hospitals ==
The Vet School includes two animal hospitals where veterinarians are trained. They are the only veterinary teaching hospitals in Denmark.

The University Teaching Hospital for Companion Animals at the Frederiksberg Campus is both a regular clinic where clients bring their companion animals for treatment and an advanced animal hospital for its own patients as well as patients referred from private vets. Its building is from 2011 and was designed by Rørbæk & Møller Arkitekter.

The University Teaching Hospital for Large Animals is situated at the Taastrup Campus in Taastrup outside Copenhagen. It is a specialized in horses and receiving patients from all across Denmark. It also runs a mobile unit for outpatients as well as a teaching unit.

The referral hospital receives a wide range of patients from the ”rare case” to plain castrations.

== Collaborations ==
The Vetschool collaborates with private companies as well as government offices. Cooperation on education is formalized through the advisory boards for the different programs. Examples of formalized collaborations include Lifepharm, Videncenter for dyrevelfærd and SHARE.
