= Taastrup Campus (University of Copenhagen) =

Coordinates: 55°40′10″N 12°18′25″E

Taastrup Campus is a university campus operated by University of Copenhagen (UCPH) in Taastrup on the western outskirts of Copenhagen, Denmark. The campus is home to space-consuming activities of the School of Veterinary Medicine and Animal Science (including the University Teaching Hospital for Large Animals) and the Department of Plant and Environmental Sciences whose Section for Crop Sciences along with experimental fields, greenhouses and an extensive pometum.

== History ==
The campus traces its history back to the 1960s when Royal Veterinary and Agricultural University acquired four farms outside Taastrup. One of them was Højbakkegård. whose land was laid out as experimental fields. An extensive pometum was also laid out in the grounds as part of the NordGen collaboration. The campus was developed according to a master plan designed by Steen Eiler Rasmussen and Mogens Koch.

The Royal Veterinary and Agricultural University was merged into the University of Copenhagen in 2007. The adoption of a new district plan opened for an expansion of the campus in 2012.

== Buildings ==
The original complex was designed by Steen Eiler Rasmussen and Mogens Koch and later buildings have been designed in a matching style and in accordance with their original master plan for the campus area. A new University Hospital for Large Animals is from 2008 and was designed by Rørbæk & Møller Arkitekter. A new indoor riding venue, Kustos-Hallen, is due for completion in 2016.

== Taastrup Pometum ==
The Pometum comprises approximately 750 apple varieties of which around 250 are local Danish varieties. Other types of fruit trees are represented with somewhere between 80 and 120 varieties. The varieties were mostly collected in the 1940s and 1950s by professor Anton Pedersen.
