= List of botanical gardens in Denmark =

Botanical gardens in Denmark feature collections consisting entirely of Denmark's native and endemic species; most have a collection that include plants from around the world. There are botanical gardens and arboreta in all states and territories of Denmark, most of which are administered by local governments, while some are privately owned.

- Aarhus
  - Botanisk Have, Aarhus, Aarhus University
  - Aarhus Forestry Botanical Garden, Aarhus Municipality
- Københavns Universitet (University of Copenhagen), Copenhagen
  - Botanisk Have, (University of Copenhagen Botanical Garden), Central campus
  - Forstbotanisk Have (Forestry Botanical Garden), Charlottenlund, Northern campus
  - Arboretet, Hørsholm
