= Gábor Vajta =

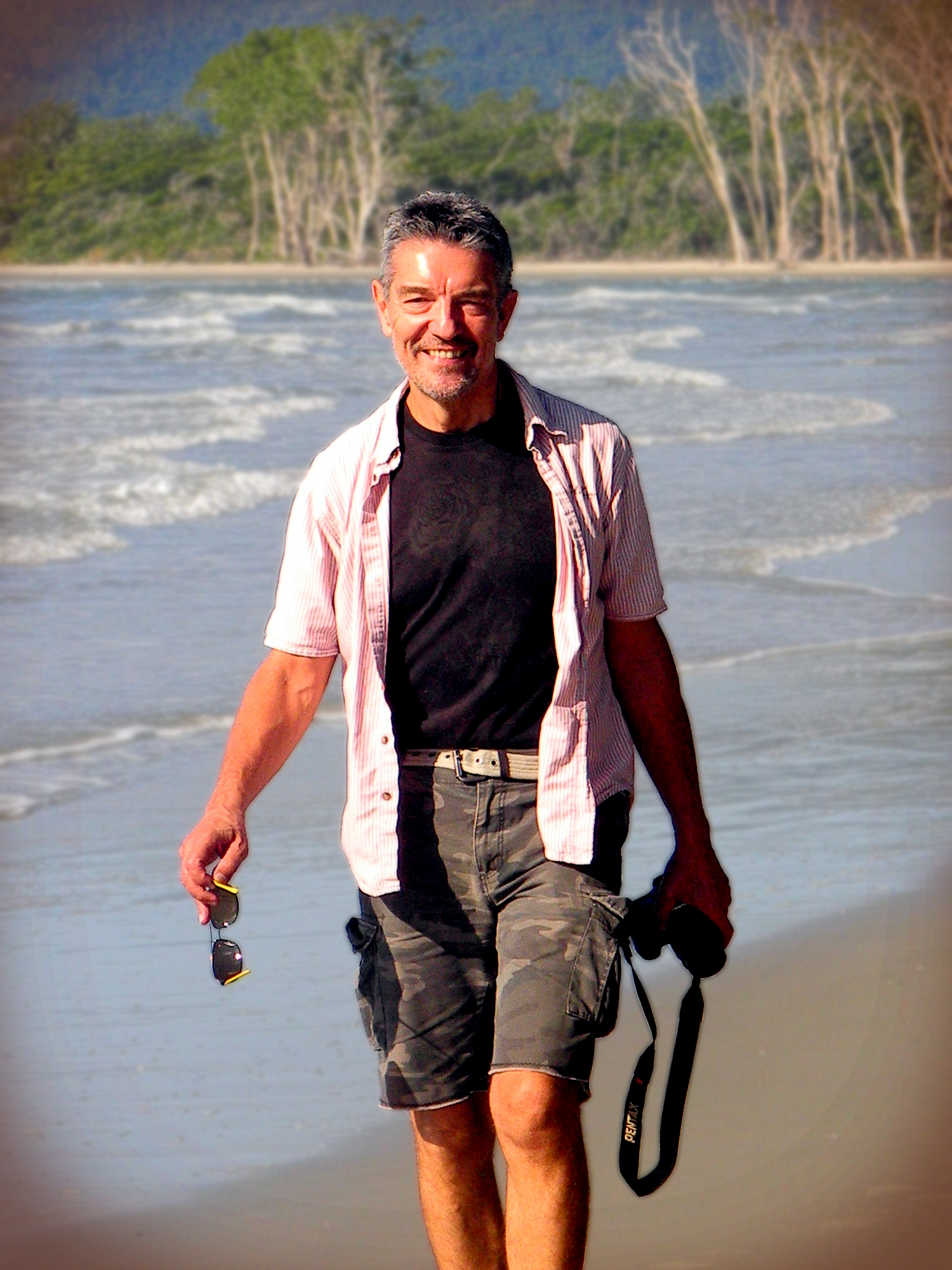
- Born: 25 August 1952 (age 74); Vác, Hungary
- Citizenship: Australian, Hungarian
- Known for: HMC (Handmade Cloning)
- Scientific career
- Fields: Medical Doctor, Human Pathologist, Domestic Animal and Human Embryologist
- Website: gaborvajta.wix.com/gaborvajta/

Gábor Vajta (born 25 August 1952) is a medical doctor, human pathologist and mammalian embryologist living in Cairns, Queensland, Australia. Vajta was an Honorary Professor of the BGI College, Shenzhen, China, and Adjunct Professor of the Central Queensland University, Rockhampton, Queensland, Australia. After an early career (university lecturer, PhD) in human pathology he turned to embryology in 1989 and obtained a Doctor of Science degree in Domestic Animal Embryology at the Royal Veterinary and Agricultural University in Copenhagen, Denmark in 1999. During the past 25 years he has co-developed several patents relating to embryology, most notably the method of Handmade Cloning (HMC), the Submarine Incubation System (SIS), the Open Pulled Straw (OPS) vitrification and the Well of the Well (WOW) system. Currently Professor Vajta is director of a consulting company providing services in human and domestic animal embryology all over the world, and founder and Chief Scientific Officer of VitaVitro Biotech Co., Ltd., Shenzhen, China.

== Research ==
Gábor Vajta’s contribution in embryology includes authorship in 152 publications (PubMed), more than 16,000 citations with h-idex 66. He was author or co-editor of five books and theses, and reviewer of journals including Human Reproduction; Reproductive Biomedicine Online; Reproduction; Biology of Reproduction, Cryobiology; Reproduction, Nutrition, Development; Reproduction, Fertility and Development; Theriogenology; Animal Reproduction Science; Reproduction in Domestic Animals; and Cellular Reprogramming.

== Handmade cloning ==
Gábor Vajta had a substantial contribution in the development of handmade cloning (HMC).

HMC is a radical technical modification of Somatic cell nuclear transfer of the original mammalian nuclear transfer technology established by Willadsen and applied for somatic cells by Wilmut and Campbell. The technique does not require micromanipulators only a simple stereomicroscope and an inexpensive fusion machine. All work is done by hand, with simple handheld tools (blade and micropipette). The first cloned animals in Africa and Scandinavia were both produced by HMC. Transgenic pigs as models for various human diseases were produced with putative genes responsible for Parkinson's and Alzheimer's disease, Psoriasis, Arteriosclerosis and Diabetes mellitus. The technology promises a new possibility for automation of the somatic cell nuclear transfer procedure. The birth of the first transgenic piglets containing the Alzheimer gene (29 October 2006) was rewarded as the Most important Scientific Achievement in Denmark in 2007.

== Open pulled straw vitrification ==
The Open pulled straw (OPS), invented by Gábor Vajta is the first purpose-developed tool for mammalian embryo and oocyte vitrification that has resulted in many breakthroughs in human and animal cryobiology including the first baby born after vitrification of human oocytes, and the first cloned mammal born after cryopreservation of the reconstructed embryo. OPS is also regarded as the most appropriate carrier tool for vitrification of human embryonic stem cells (hESCs).
