= Frederiksberg Campus (University of Copenhagen) =

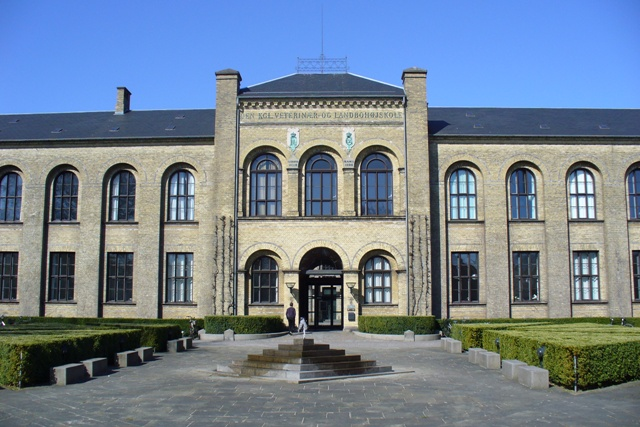
The main building of University of Copenhagen's Frederiksberg Campus

Frederiksberg Campus is one of the four main campuses of University of Copenhagen in Copenhagen, Denmark. It is located in Frederiksberg and is home to large parts of the Faculty of Science' activities within the fields of natural science and biosciences as well as part of the School of Veterinary Medicine and Animal Science at the Faculty of Health and Medical Sciences, including the University Hospital for Companion Animals. The main campus is located on the west side of Bülowsvej, on both sides of Thorvaldsensvej and Rolighedsvej. It occupies the former grounds of the Royal Veterinary and Agricultural University (KVL) which was merged into the University of Copenhagen in 2007. The main building at Bülowsvej No. 17 is from 1895.

== Selected buildings ==
=== Area 1: Bülowsvej 17 ===
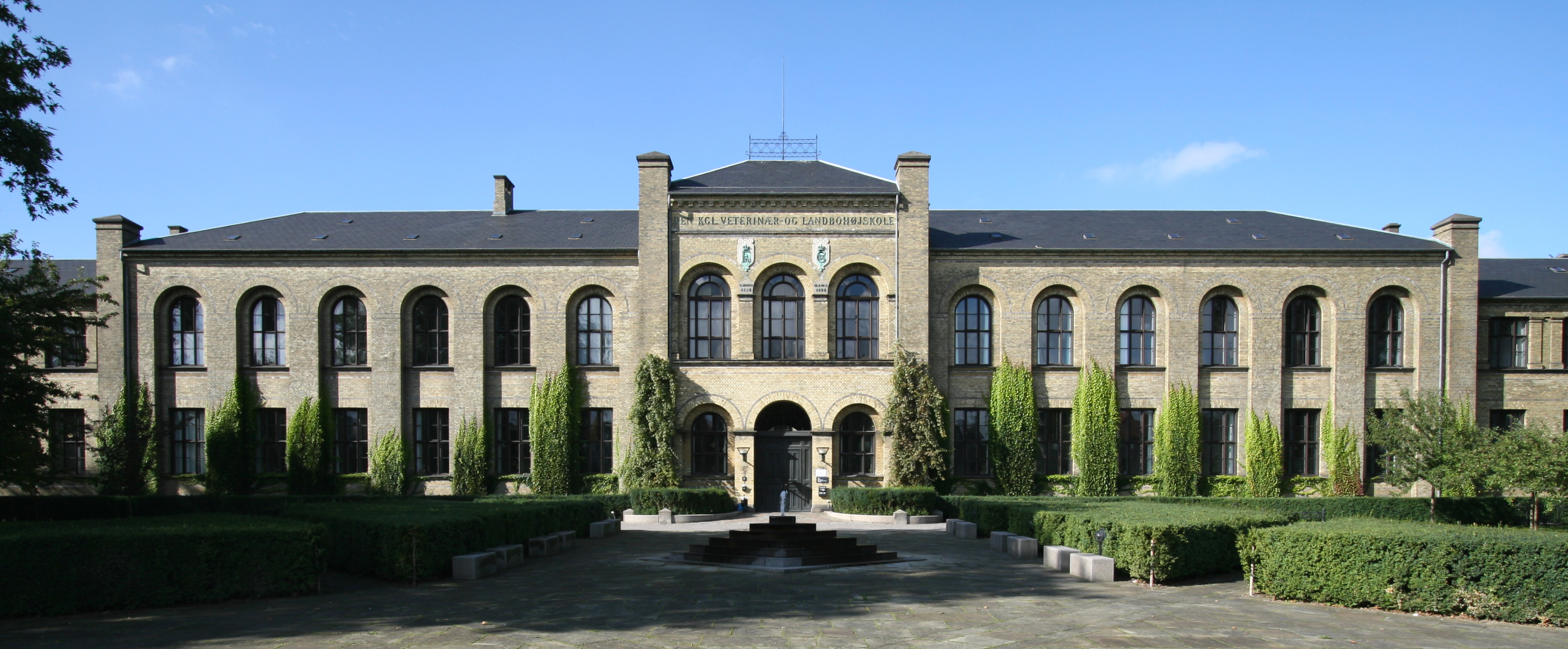
The main building of University of Copenhagen's Frederiksberg Campus

The main building at Bülowsvej 17 is a large four-winged complex surrounding a central courtyard. The original three-winged building was designed by Michael Gottlieb Bindesbøll. It was later expanded by Johannes Emil Gnudtzmann in 1895. The Great Auditorium (Danish: Fastauditoriet) features murals by Georg Hilker depicting farm animals, legendary creatures and Flora Danica illustrations.

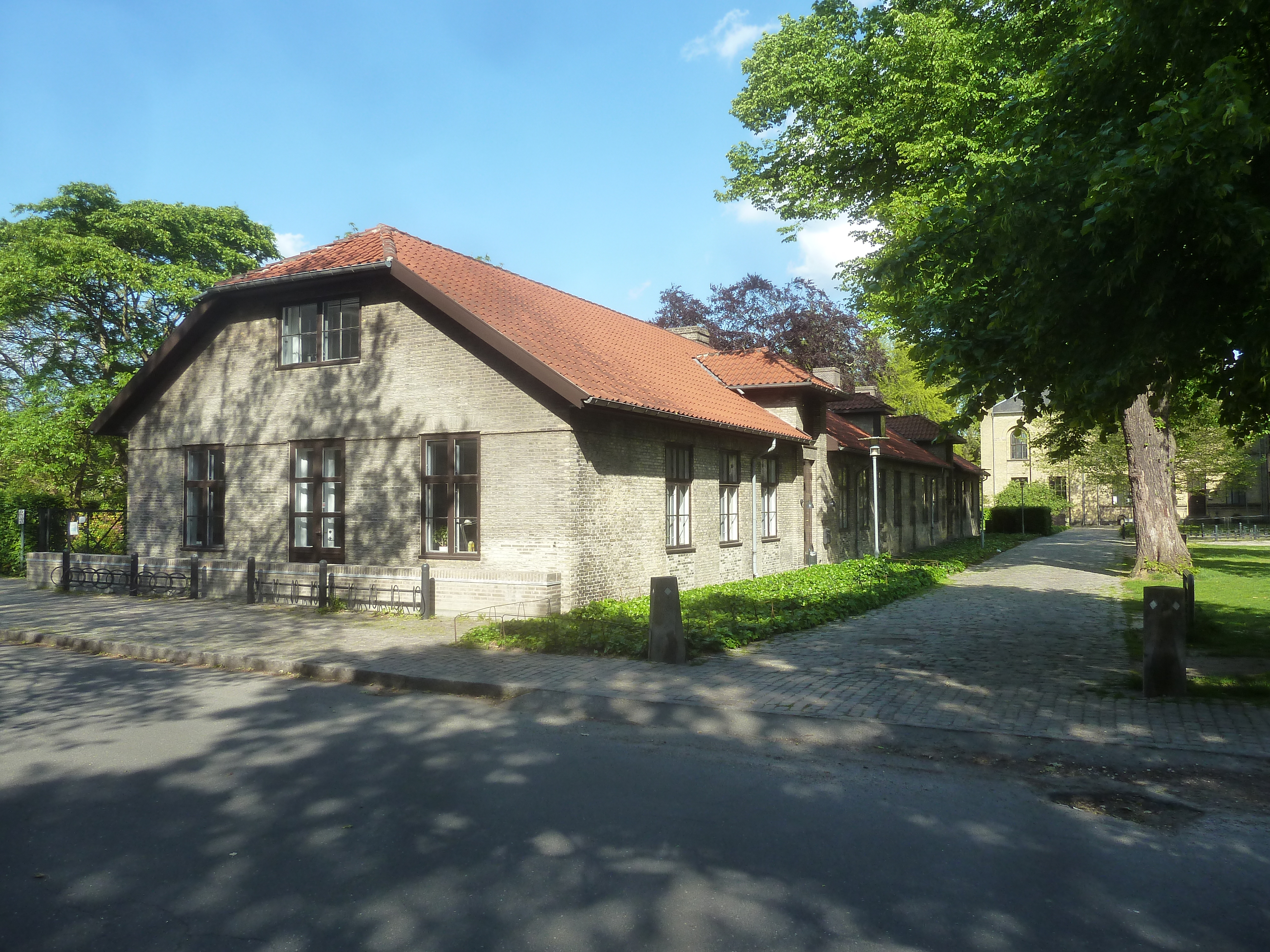
Grønnegårdsvej 10

Most of the other historic buildings are located along the internal streets Grønnegårdsvej, Dyrlægevej and Stigbøjlen. Grønnegårdsvej, a roughly parallel street to Bülowsvej, runs from Thorvaldsensvej in the north to Dyrlægevej in the south. The two identical buildings at Grønnegårdsvej No. 8 and 10 are part of Gottlieb Bindesbøll's original complex from 1856–58 and are listed together with the main building. Gimle, a former community centre at Grundtvigsvej 14 which was taken over by KVL in 1956, is used as canteen.

=== Area 2: Thorvaldsensvej 40 ===
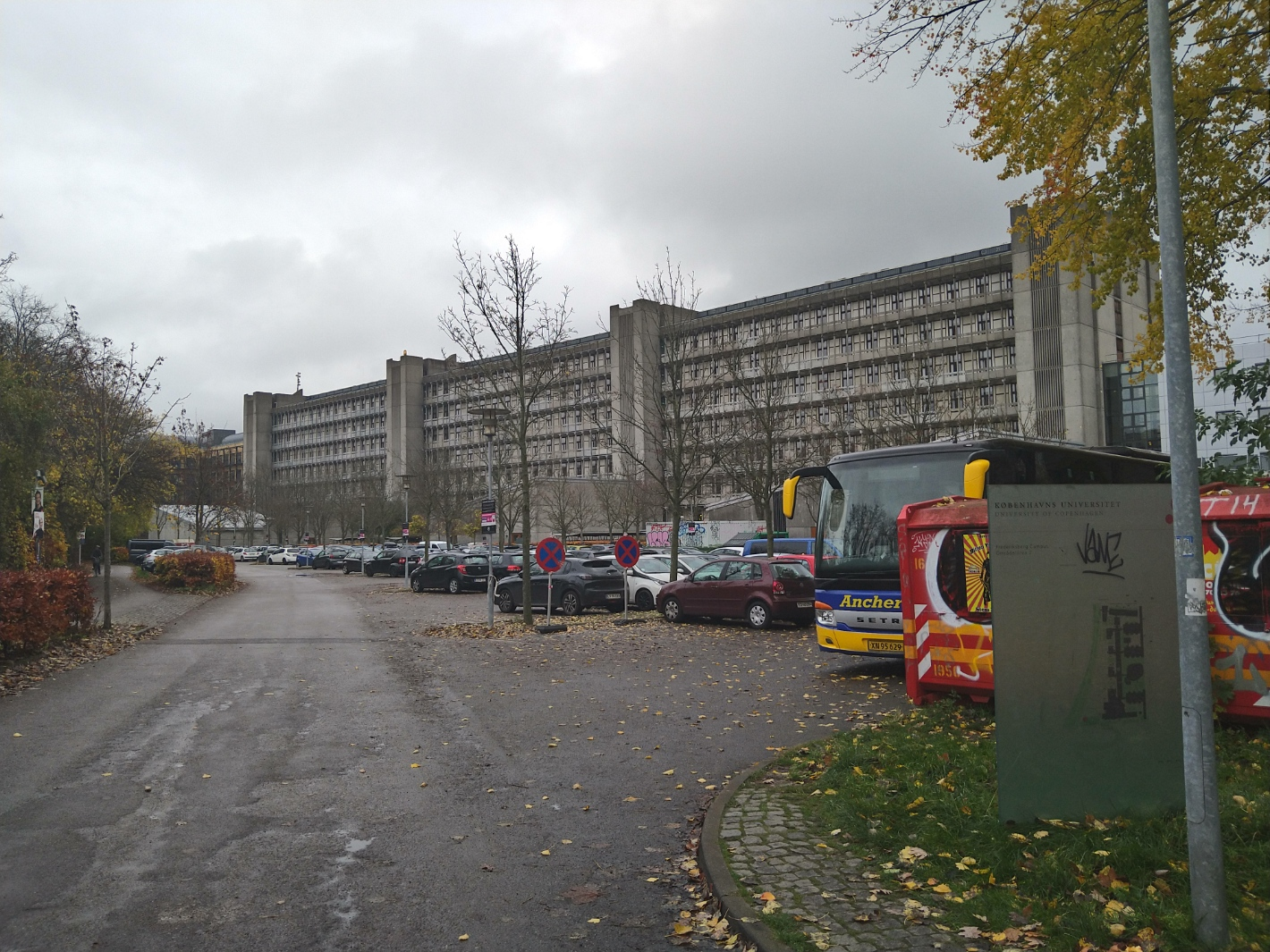
"The Highrise", Thorvaldsensvej 40

The area was separated from the rest of the campus when Thorvaldsensvej was extended. The area was originally part of KVL's botanical gardens. The central 7-storey building is colloquially known as "The Highrise" (Danish: Højhuset) on the otherwise flat campus. It was built between 1963 and 1971 to design by Steen Eiler Rasmussen and Mogens Koch. A new building on Rolighedsvej (No. 30) was completed in 1995 to design my Erik Møllers Arkitekter. The Department of Food Science is based in the building. Next to it is another modern building (Rolighedsvej 26) which was completed in 2013 to design by Wiberg Arkitekter and Witraz/Rambøll, arkitekter. It is also used by the Department of Food Science.

Copenhagen Plant Science Center is now (2016) under construction on the east side of the 70s building. It is designed by Lundgaard & Tranberg and will consist of four cylindrical buildings with a total area of 13,034 square metres when it is completed in 2019.

=== Area 3: Rolighedsvej 23 ===
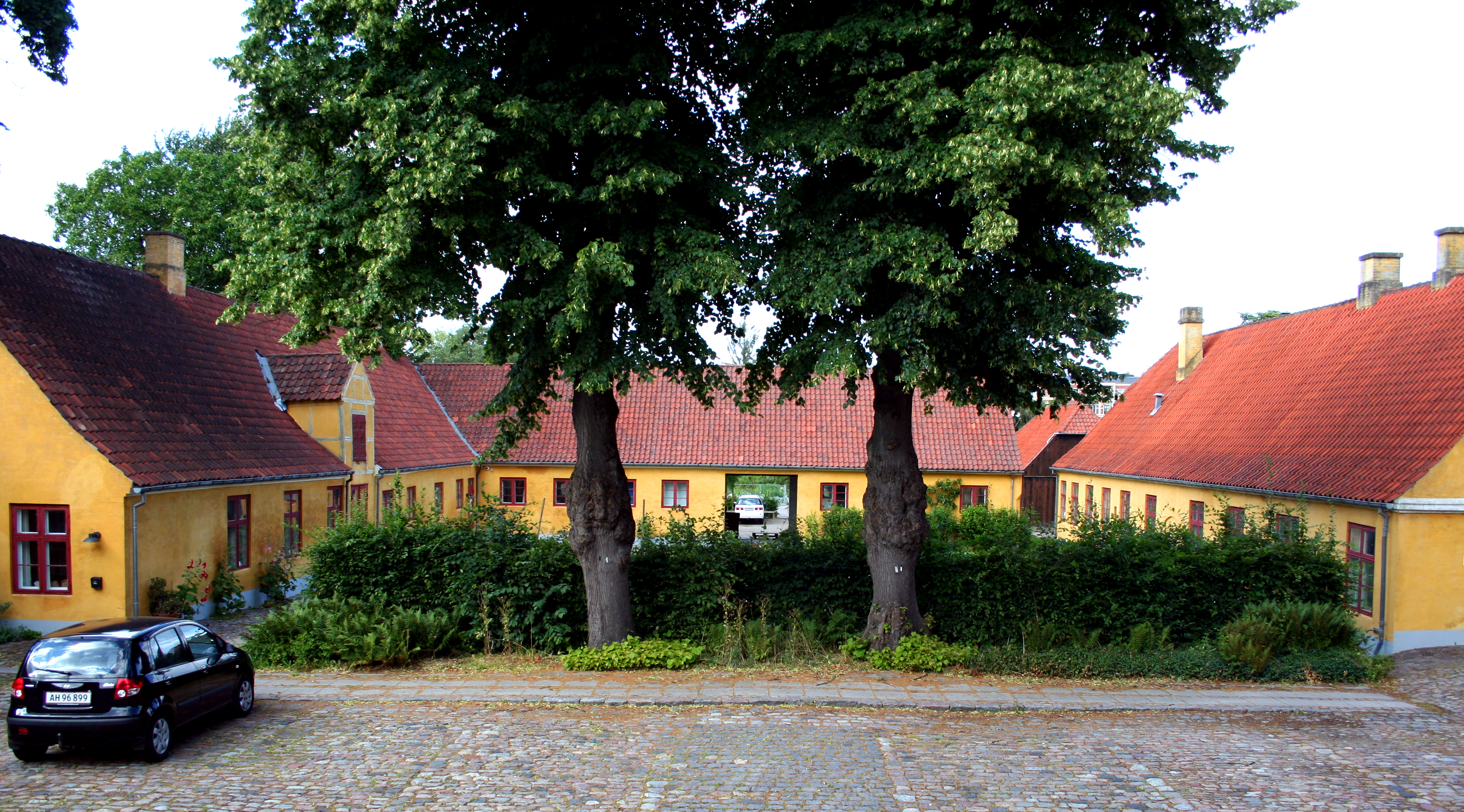
Some of Rolighed's old farm buildings

The area on the north side of Rolighedsvej was originally part of the Rolighed estate but sold to Københavns Sygehjem in 1859. It was reacquired by KVL in 1922. The university also uses the old Rolighed building (No. 21) and its old farm buildings, all of which are listed.

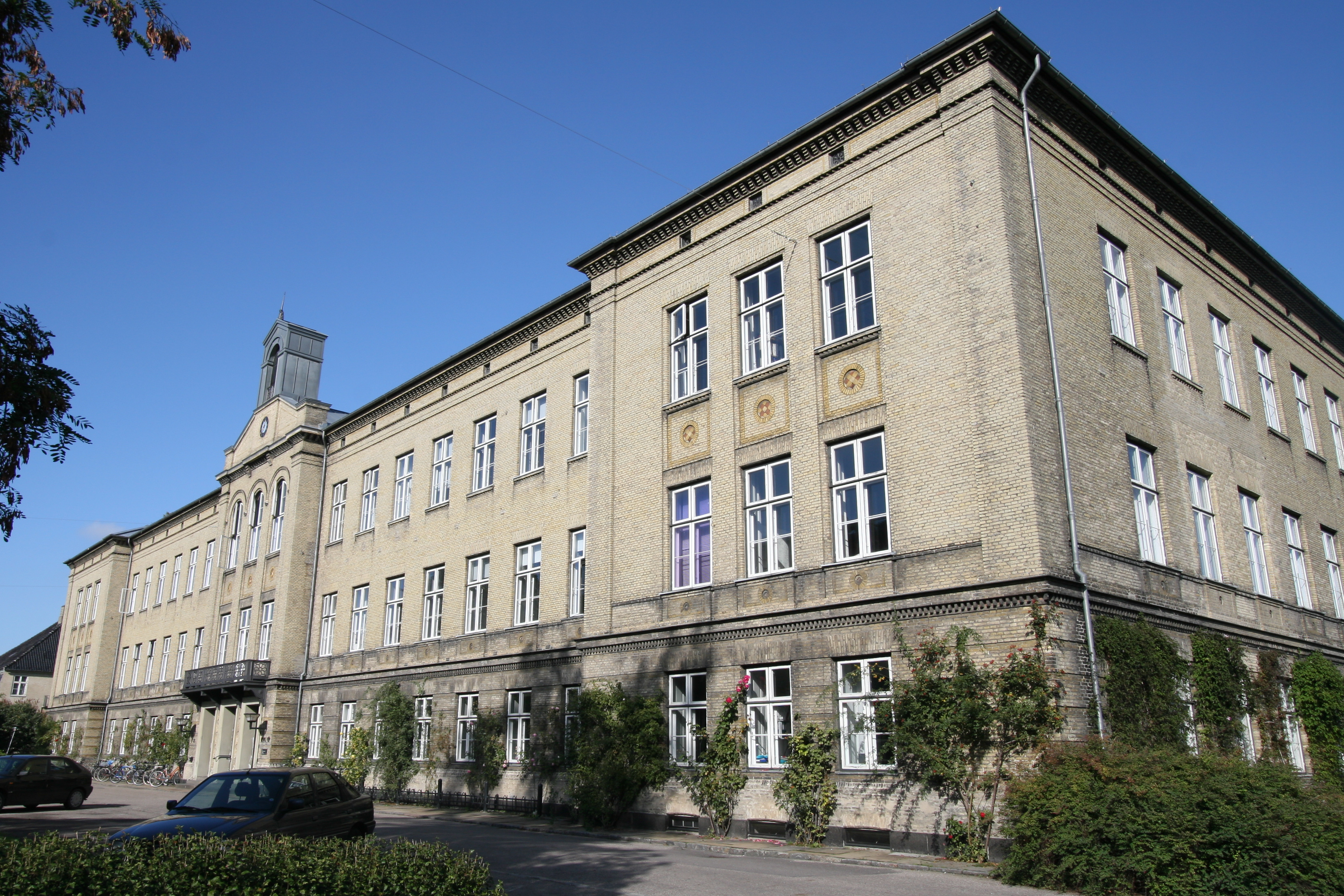
Rolighedsvej 23

Københavns Sygehjem's old main building (Rolighedsvej 23) is now home to the Department of Geosciences and Natural Resource Management. The Late Neoclassical building is the former's Section for Landscape Architecture and Urban Planning. The building is from 1859 and was designed by Harald Conrad Stilling. It was expanded by Rørbæk & Møller Arkitekter in 2013.

The Department of Food and Resource Economy is located at No. 25. The building to the right was built for Landøkonomisk Forsøgslaboratorium in 1993 to design by Ludvig Fenger. Landbrugsøkonomisk Forsøgslaboratorium was expanded with a free-standing building designed by Hans Georg Skovgaard to the east in 1935. The two buildings are now connected by a glazed skywalk.

== The University Gardens ==
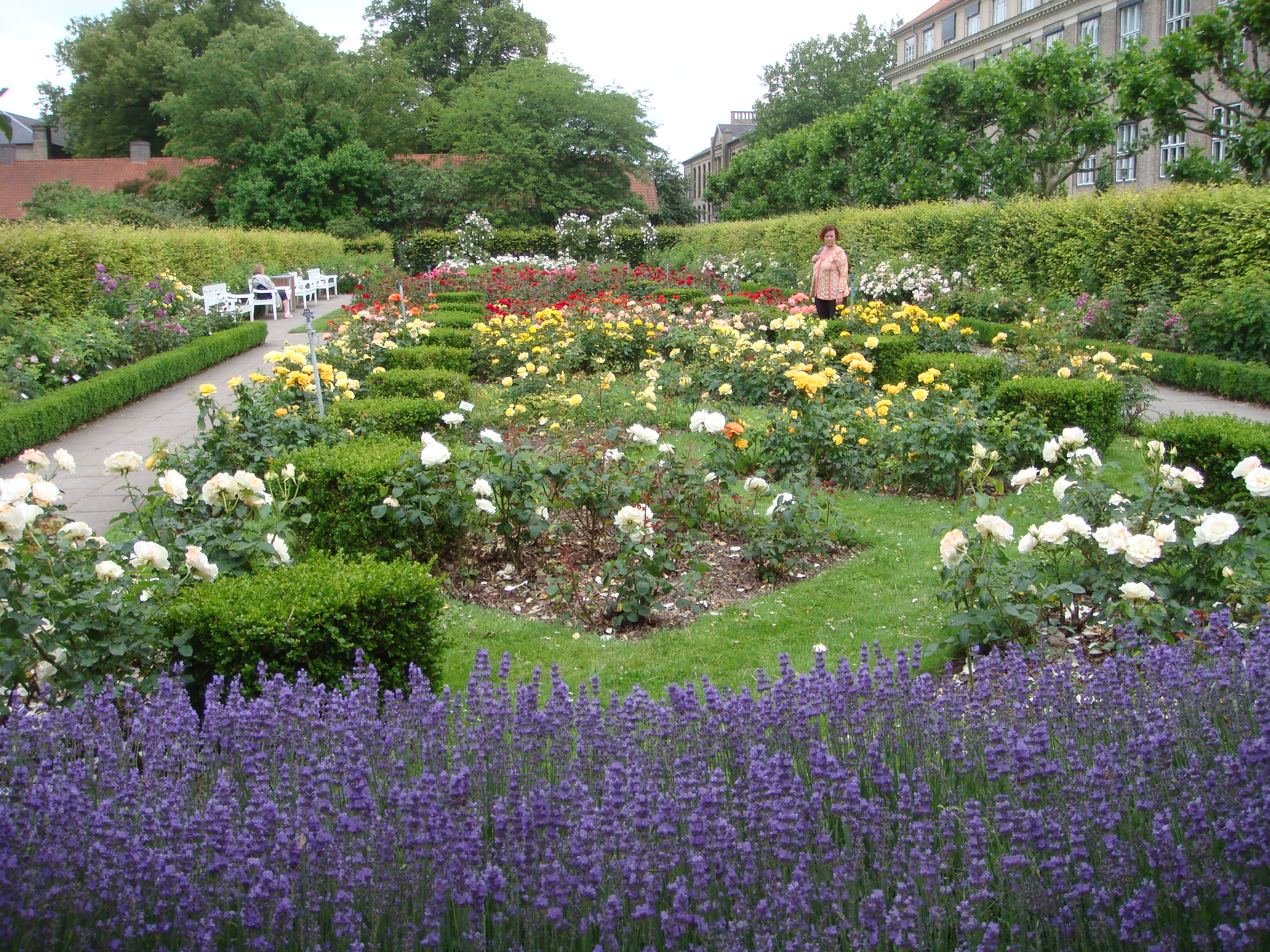
The rose garden

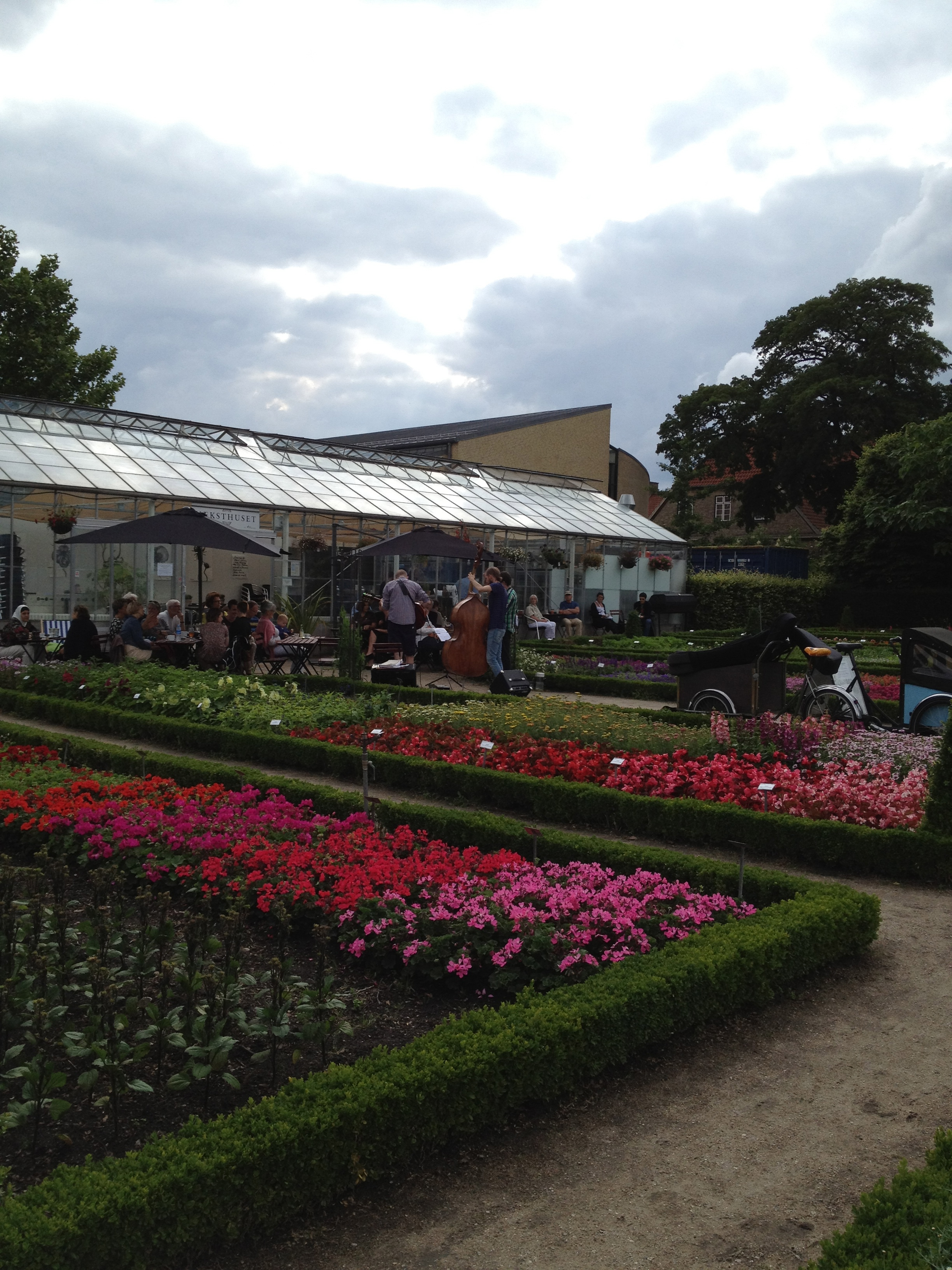
The café

When KVL opened in 1864, it comprised a botanical garden. It was formerly known as Landbohøjskolens Botaniske Have but its official name is now Universitetshaverne (The University Gardens). One of the old greenhouses has been converted into a café. The garden is located to the north and west of the old main building.

Gartnerboligen (The Gardeners' House) is from 1919 and contained residential quarters for the gardeners. It has now been converted into rooms for international students.

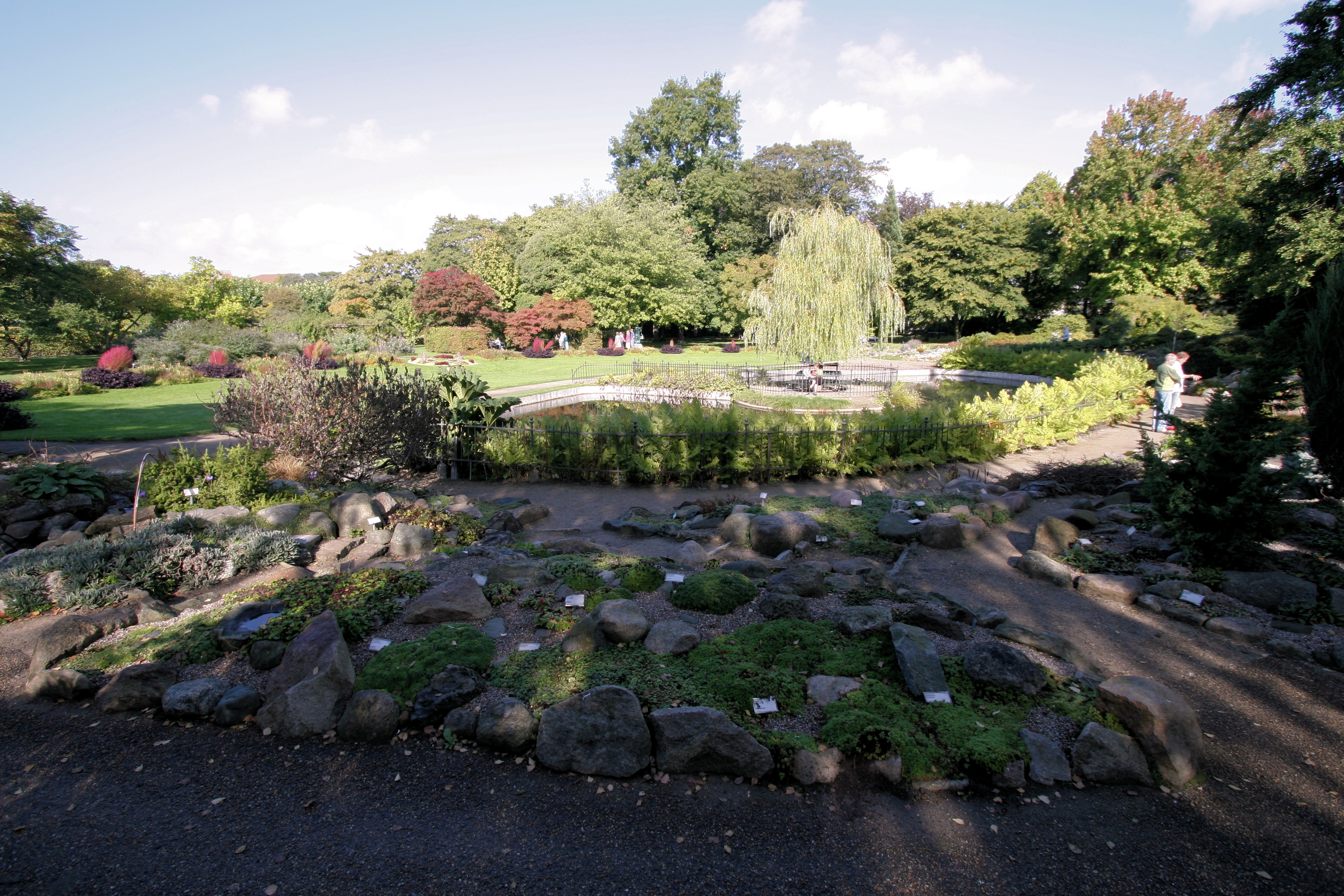
In the Garden of the Faculty of Life Sciences, emphasis is placed on plants that belong in parks and gardens, in contrast to the Botanical Garden, which mainly shows wild plants. Credit: Ib Rasmussen

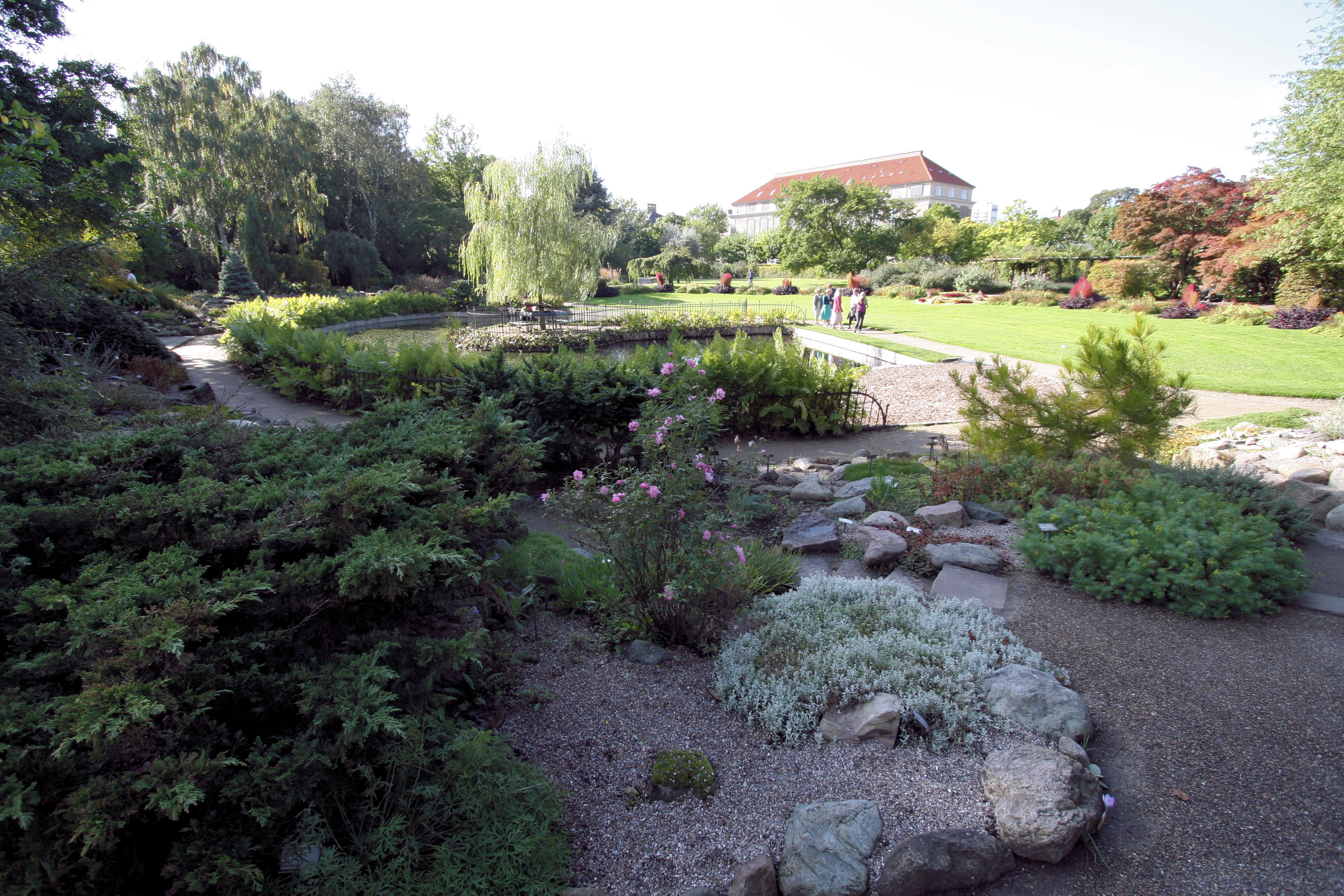
Det Biovidenskabelige Fakultets Have Credit: Ib Rasmussen

Det Biovidenskabelige Fakultets Have (commonly known as Haven) is a botanical garden which lies on Bülowsvej in Frederiksberg and belongs to the University of Copenhagen Faculty of Life Sciences The garden is a research and study garden for researchers and students. However, there is also public access, and the garden contains flowering trees and bushes all year round.

The garden was opened in 1858 under the name "Landbohøjskolens Have" at the same time as the Kgl. Veterinær- og Landbohøjskole was built, and the central part with a small pond and hanging garden has remained unchanged since then.

Many of the large trees are therefore 140 years old. The gardens' largest tree is a beech with a circumference of 5 metres. The garden has over 6,000 different plants, all of which has nameplates. The garden has a rose garden from 1929, which was planted by Georg Georgsen and contains hundreds of large-flowered and historic roses.

In contrast with University of Copenhagen Botanical Garden – which mainly contains wild plants - the emphasis here is on plants which are usually shown in gardens and parks.

== Monuments and artworks ==
In front of the building at Grønnegårdsvej 7 is a line of busts commemorating former professors and other people associated with the premises. They include Bernhard Bang (August Hassel, 1923) and Carl Oluf Jensen (August Hassel). On the opposite side of the street is a small plaza with a stone bench and a bust of Peter Christian Abildgaard, founder of the Royal Agrivultural and Veterinary College.

In front of Landøkonomisk Forsøgslanoratoirum's former building at Rolighedsvej 25 stands a statue of Niels Fjord, founder of the institution. The statue was created by Aksel Hansen and was installed in 1892. The University Gardens contain a number of statues. One of them is Vilhelm Bissen's A Milkmaid.

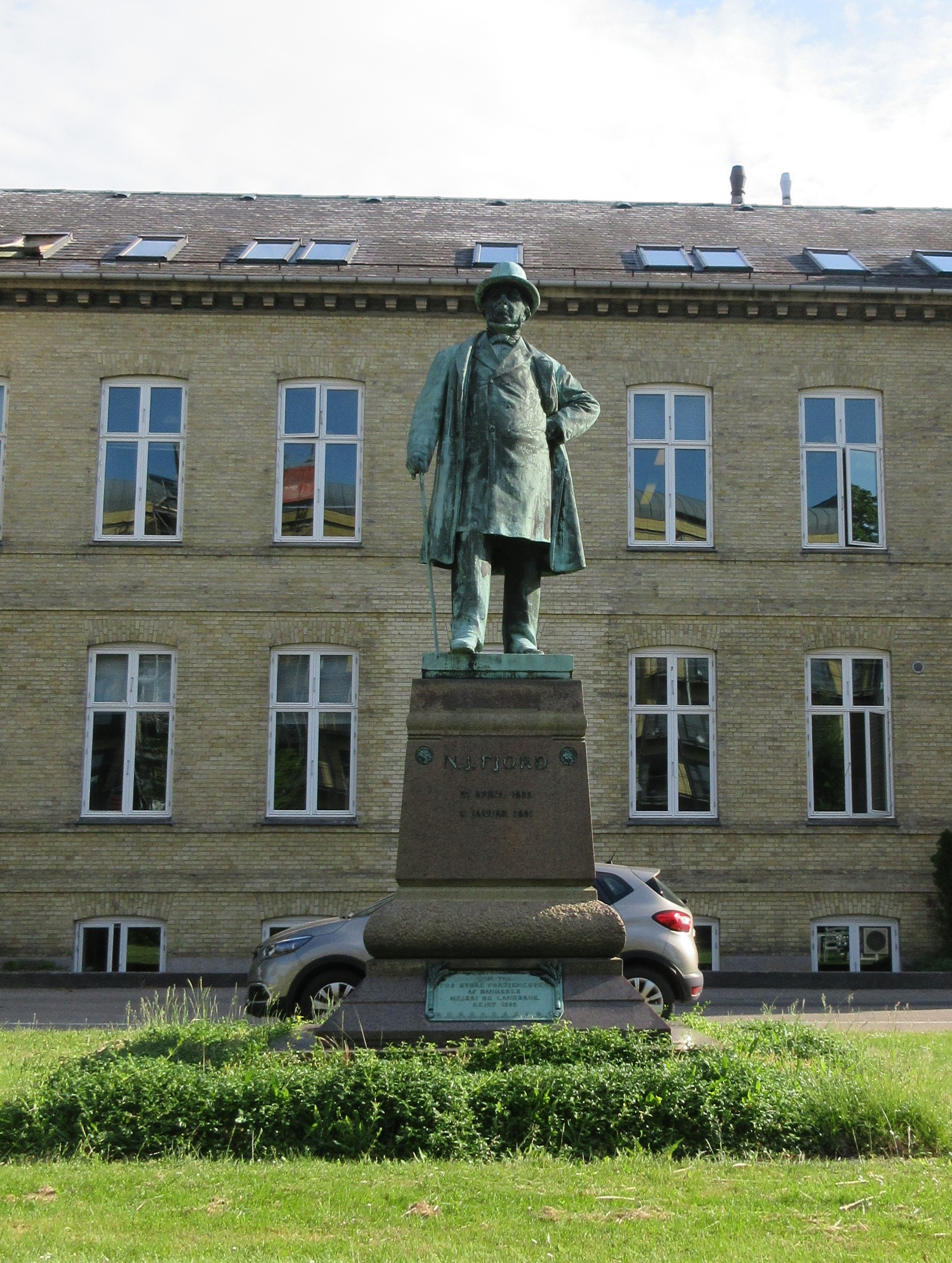
Niels Fhord statue in front of Rolighedsvej 25

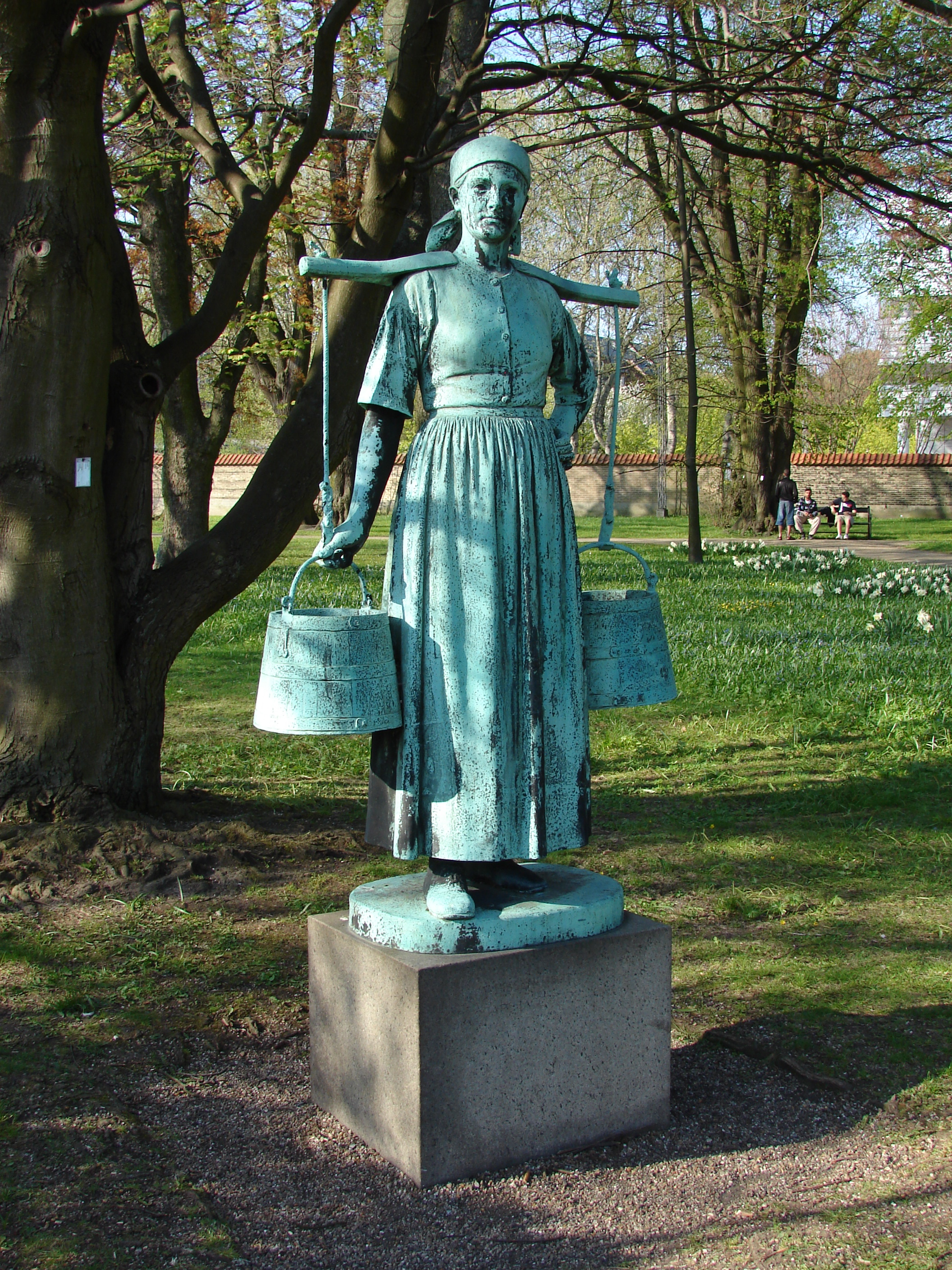
Vilhelm Bissen: A Milkmaid

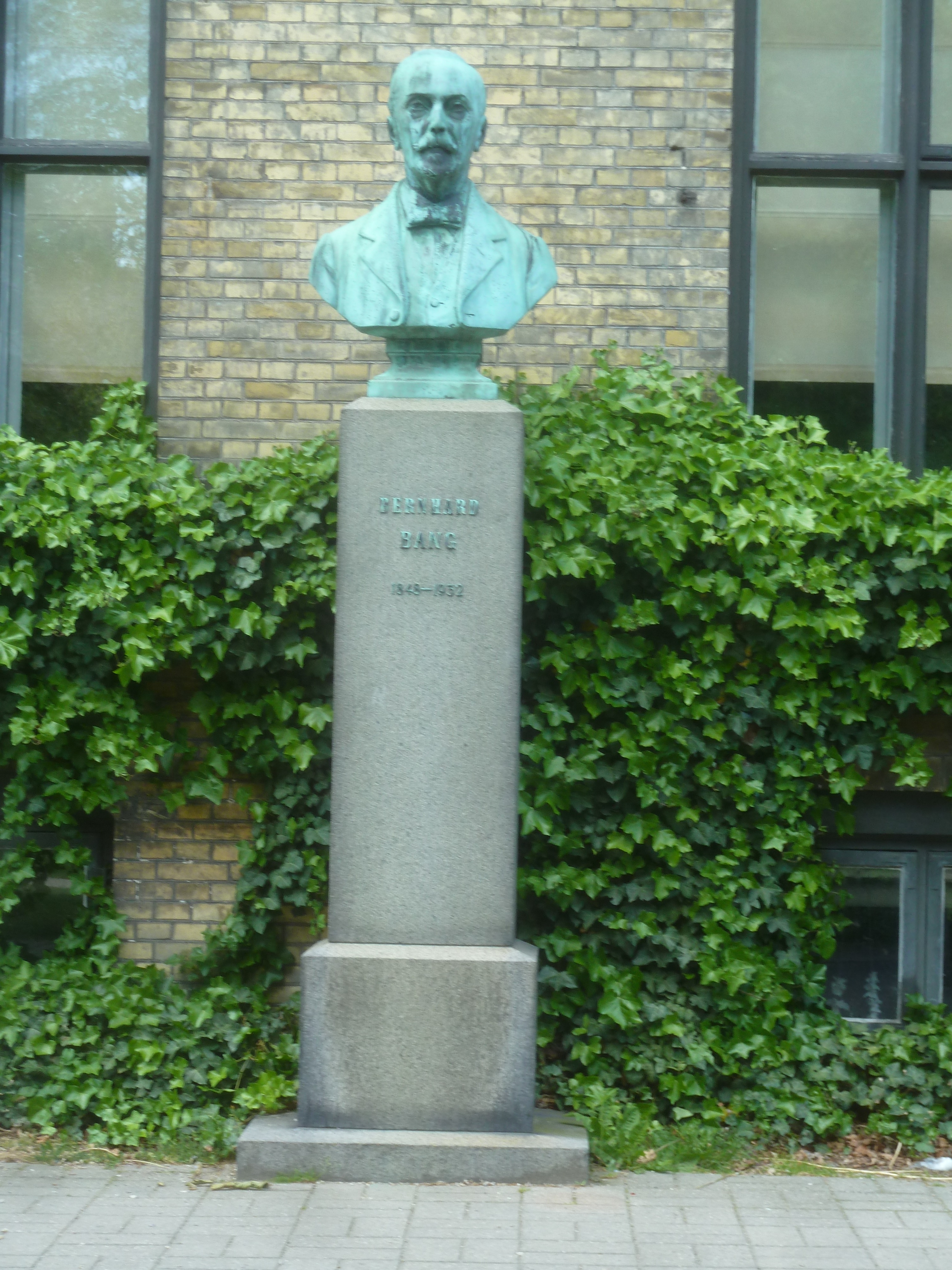
August Hassel:Bernhard Bang

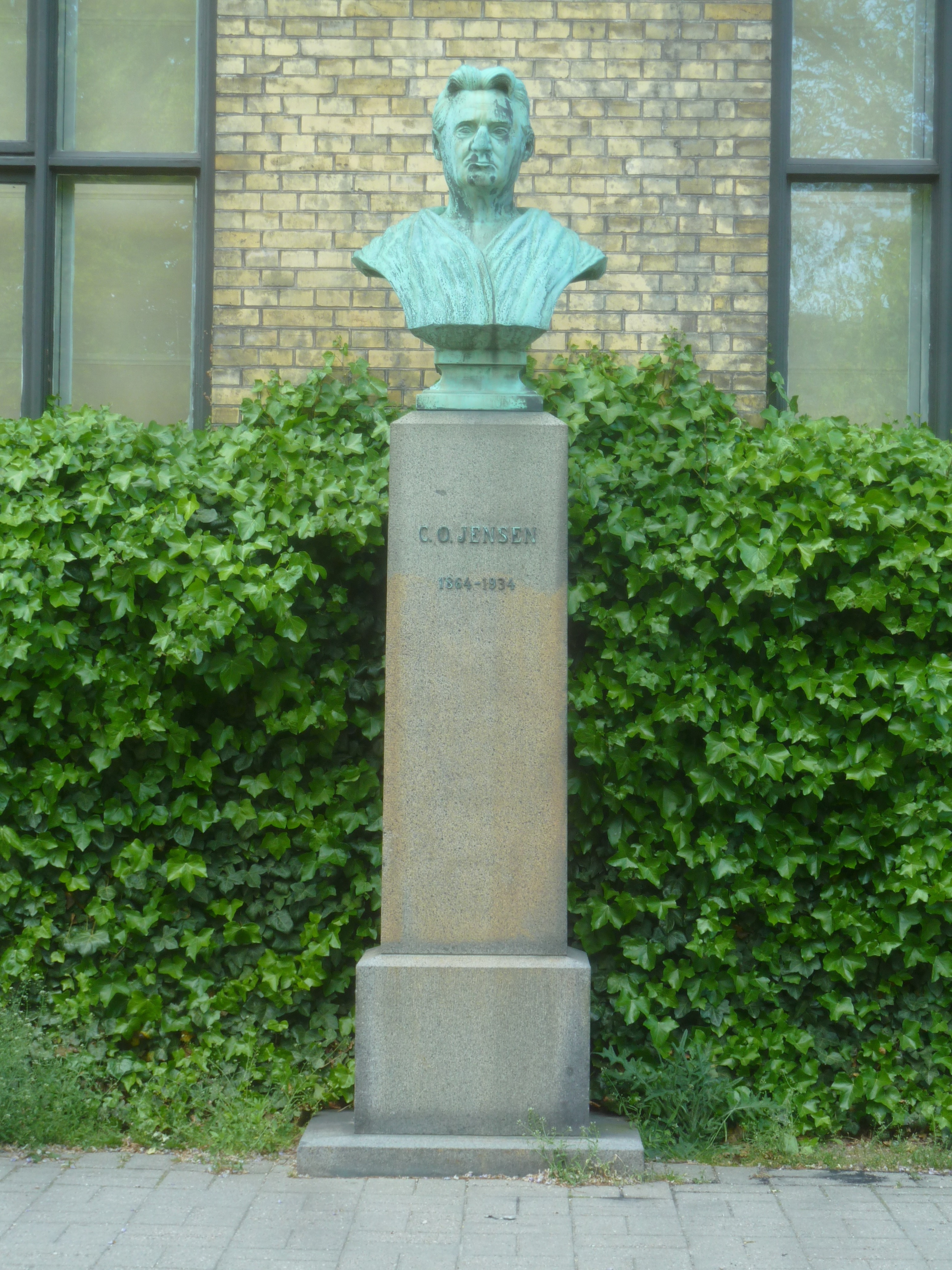
August Hassel:Carl Oluf Jensen
