= Svend O. Heiberg Memorial Forest =

Research forest in New York, United States

- Location within New York
- Location: New York, United States
- Coordinates: 42°47′12″N 76°05′37″W
- Area: 3,800 acres (15 km^{2})
- Established: 1948

Svend O. Heiberg Memorial Forest is a 3,800-acre (1,500-hectare) research forest located in parts of Onondaga and Cortland counties, and within the towns of Truxton, Preble, Fabius, and Tully in New York State. Originally Tully Experimental Forest, the forest was renamed in 1965 after Svend O. Heiberg, former Associate Dean of Graduate Studies at the New York State College of Forestry at Syracuse University (now SUNY-ESF), in Syracuse, New York.

== History and facilities ==
Heiberg Memorial Forest was established in 1948 with 1,650 acres (6.7 km^{2}) obtained from the New York State Department of Environmental Conservation in exchange for SUNY-ESF's Salamanca Forest in Cattaraugus County. The forest today consists of 3,800 acres (5.9 sq mi; 15 km^{2}) utilized as a research forest as part of SUNY-ESF's regional campus and includes classrooms, research buildings and other facilities.

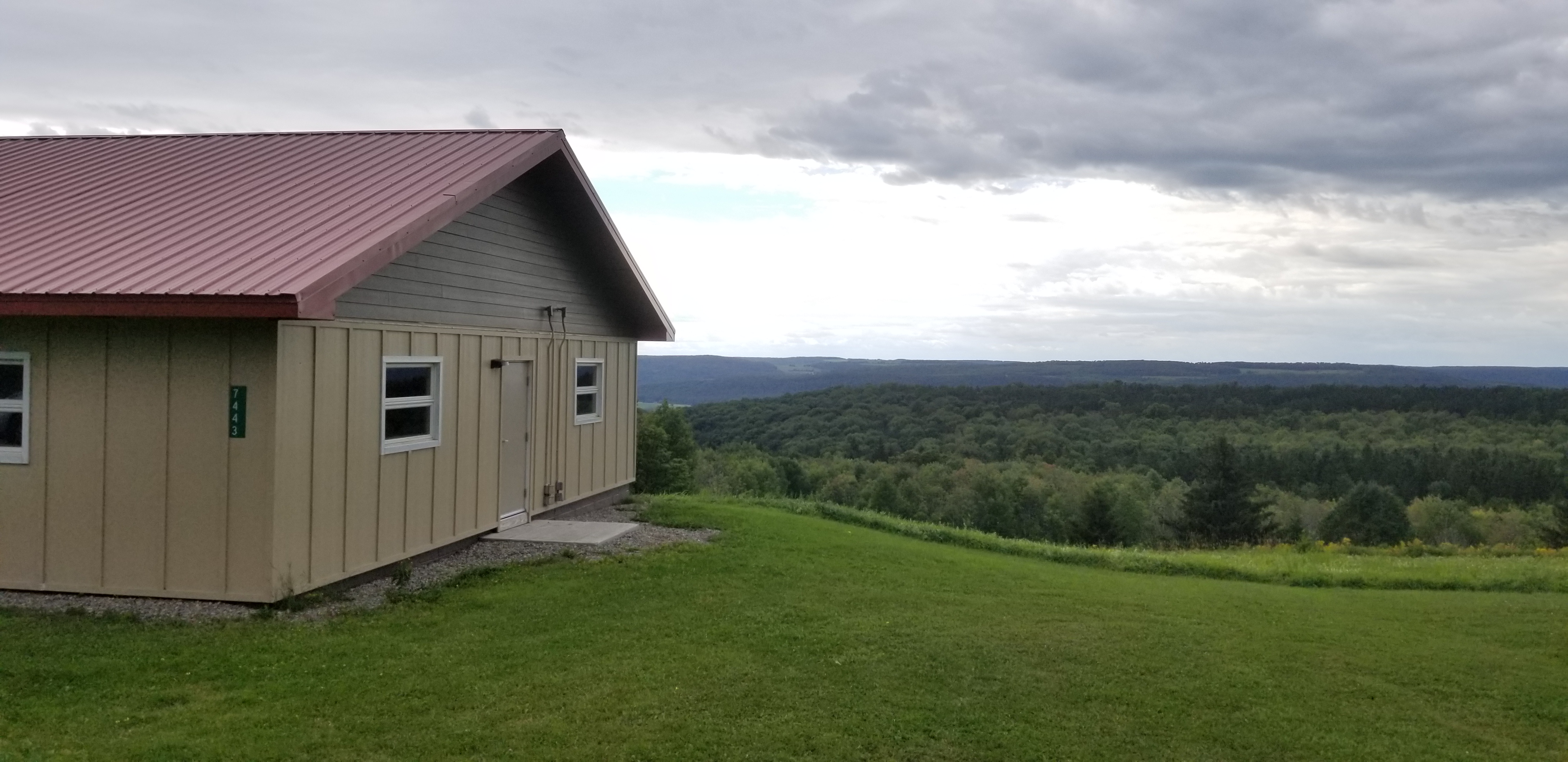
Classroom at Heiberg Forest (2020)

== Public access ==
The forest is accessible to the public. Over 12 miles (19 km) of trails provide recreation opportunities, including the Heiberg Memorial Forest Trail, a 1.9-mile-long (3.1 km) loop that permits hiking and cross-country skiing.

Two small ponds are available for fishing within Heiberg Memorial Forest. Six-acre (2.4 ha) Padget Pond and three-acre (1.2 ha) Sargent Pond are both stocked annually in the fall, with Padget Pond receiving 2,000 fingerling rainbow trout and Sargent Pond receiving 700 fingerling brook trout. Both ponds are accessible via an approximately 0.75-mile-long (1.2 km) trail from a parking area on Maple Ridge Road.

Cut-your-own Christmas trees, including Douglas fir and balsam fir, are sold at the forest each year.

== Climate ==
Climate data for Tully Heiberg Forest, New York, 1991–2020 normals, 1967–2020 extremes: 1899ft (579m)
Month	Jan	Feb	Mar	Apr	May	Jun	Jul	Aug	Sep	Oct	Nov	Dec	Year
Record high °F (°C)	63 (17)	58 (14)	80 (27)	85 (29)	88 (31)	90 (32)	93 (34)	92 (33)	89 (32)	80 (27)	74 (23)	65 (18)	93 (34)
Mean maximum °F (°C)	49 (9)	49 (9)	62 (17)	74 (23)	80 (27)	85 (29)	86 (30)	85 (29)	81 (27)	73 (23)	63 (17)	51 (11)	87 (31)
Mean daily maximum °F (°C)	28.6 (−1.9)	30.8 (−0.7)	38.5 (3.6)	51.8 (11.0)	64.8 (18.2)	72.8 (22.7)	77.3 (25.2)	76.1 (24.5)	68.6 (20.3)	56.6 (13.7)	44.6 (7.0)	33.6 (0.9)	53.7 (12.0)
Daily mean °F (°C)	20.0 (−6.7)	21.4 (−5.9)	29.2 (−1.6)	41.6 (5.3)	53.7 (12.1)	62.3 (16.8)	66.9 (19.4)	65.7 (18.7)	58.4 (14.7)	47.3 (8.5)	36.2 (2.3)	26.0 (−3.3)	44.1 (6.7)
Mean daily minimum °F (°C)	11.4 (−11.4)	12.1 (−11.1)	19.9 (−6.7)	31.4 (−0.3)	42.6 (5.9)	51.8 (11.0)	56.6 (13.7)	55.4 (13.0)	48.2 (9.0)	38.0 (3.3)	27.7 (−2.4)	18.4 (−7.6)	34.5 (1.4)
Mean minimum °F (°C)	−10 (−23)	−9 (−23)	0 (−18)	15 (−9)	28 (−2)	37 (3)	44 (7)	42 (6)	33 (1)	23 (−5)	12 (−11)	−3 (−19)	−14 (−26)
Record low °F (°C)	−21 (−29)	−22 (−30)	−11 (−24)	5 (−15)	17 (−8)	30 (−1)	37 (3)	33 (1)	22 (−6)	14 (−10)	0 (−18)	−29 (−34)	−29 (−34)
Average precipitation inches (mm)	2.89 (73)	2.92 (74)	3.65 (93)	4.18 (106)	3.63 (92)	5.06 (129)	4.61 (117)	4.75 (121)	4.85 (123)	4.51 (115)	3.85 (98)	3.61 (92)	48.51 (1,233)
Average snowfall inches (cm)	25.20 (64.0)	24.80 (63.0)	25.40 (64.5)	7.50 (19.1)	0.50 (1.3)	0.00 (0.00)	0.00 (0.00)	0.00 (0.00)	0.00 (0.00)	1.60 (4.1)	11.20 (28.4)	21.10 (53.6)	117.3 (298)
Source 1: NOAA
Source 2: XMACIS (records & monthly max/mins)
