= Ebba Lund =

Danish resistance fighter and scientist (1923–1999)

- Born: 22 September 1923; Copenhagen, Denmark
- Died: 21 June 1999 (aged 75); Copenhagen, Denmark
- Occupations: Resistance fighter, microbiologist, chemical engineer, professor
- Years active: 1942–1999

Ebba Lund (22 September 1923 – 21 June 1999) was a Danish Resistance fighter during World War II, a chemical engineer, and a microbiologist.

== Early life ==
Ebba Lund was born in 1923 to parents Søren Aabye Kierkegaard (1875–1956) and Anna Petrea Lindberg (1890–1980). Her father was an engineer. The Copenhagen community in which she grew up was considered to be very conservative.

== Resistance work ==
Lund began her resistance work in 1942, two years after the German invasion of Denmark, when she was 20 years old. Her work initially consisted of publishing illegal underground newspapers with her sister, Ulla. Lund worked for Frit Danmark (Free Denmark), a voguish clandestine newspaper, which would go on to publish over six million copies by the end of World War II.

After the collapse of the Danish government, Lund went on to join Holger Danske, a sabotage-oriented Resistance group. Upon joining the Holger Danske resistance group, she became responsible for fishing boats that would secretly bring Jews to safety. Due to connections on the nearby island of Christianso, Lund was able to organize almost a dozen fishing boats for the transportation of Jews to Sweden. She also managed to convince several local landowners to provide the funding for these trips. Safe houses were set up for Jews until they could safely be taken to Sweden, and Lund's own house was used as a safe house. During her rescue operations, she became known as the "Girl with the Red Cap" or "Red Riding Hood" because of the red hat she wore to signal the Jews to be escorted to look for her. The Resistance did not only aid Jewish individuals, however; they also assisted defecting German soldiers and other Resistance members. Thanks to connections within the Holger Danske, including bribery and partnerships with members of the German army, Lund was able to avoid multiple run-ins with German forces.

The Holger Danske group helped save 700-800 Jews in only a few weeks by offering means of escape. Lund herself had a hand in about 500 of these missions. She managed to escape arrest because, at a time when many of her fellow Resistance workers were being arrested, she was hospitalized with blood poisoning. In 1944, she became pregnant with her first child, Vita, and withdrew entirely from Resistance work.

== Education and research ==
Before her recruitment into the Holger Danske, Lund graduated from the Ingrid Jespersens Gymnasieskole in 1942. After the war, she studied chemical engineering and immunology. She went on to attend the Technical University of Denmark, where she graduated as a chemical engineer with a specialty in microbiology. Following her graduation, Lund was first employed in 1947 at the University of Copenhagen at the Carlsberg Foundation Biological Institute.

Following a move to Gothenburg with her spouse, Lund became employed at both the Sahlgrenska University Hospital from 1954 to 1966 and the University of Gothenburg's Faculty of Medicine in 1963. She performed research on the polio virus in response to a polio epidemic occurring in Denmark at the time. Her research pertained to the investigation of cell culture methods for the research and diagnosis of polio. In 1963, Lund presented her dissertation resulting from this work entitled Oxidative Inactivation of Poliovirus for her Ph.D. at the University of Copenhagen. Along with polio, Lund researched and advocated for vaccinations for foot-and-mouth disease.

Lund became the head of the Department of Virology and Immunology at the Royal Veterinary and Agricultural University in Copenhagen in 1966. She became the first female professor of this institution in 1969 and held her position there until 1993. During her time here, she taught epidemiology as well as various classes agriculture and veterinary sciences. She performed vast amounts of research during her time at the University of Copenhagen. Her research included work in the inactivation of viruses in wastewater and seawater as well as research in parasite toxoplasm. In particular, much of her research pertained to virus isolation from seawater and sewage waste. She also emphasized the importance of understanding how diseases move from animals to humans.

Lund worked with the Danish Fur Breeders to study the diseases of mink puppies. With the help of the Danish Fur Breeders, she developed the world's first economically viable antigen that could diagnose plasmacytosis, a disease that is very common in minks. This allowed breeders to know which puppies were more susceptible to the disease and helped with the question of which puppies to vaccinate.

Lund was an incredibly prolific scientist; she published 124 works in her lifetime, including 84 in English, as well as a lecture series and other content. She created two textbooks: Virology for Veterinary Students, 8th edition, and Immunology for Veterinary Students, 4th edition. She also wrote the books "Water Pollution" and "Gene Splicing" and co-authored the book "Water Reuse" with her spouse.

== Organizations and awards ==
Lund also participated in and assisted several organizations during her time. In particular, she worked with the Danish Fur Breeders Association in researching puppy disease and vaccinations in 1969. Coupled with this association, she was the first in the world to produce an effective antigen in cell cultures that diagnosed the disease plasmacytosis. This antigen was sold throughout Europe.

Lund collaborated with the World Health Organization in 1968 on the effects of water pollution. At this time she also worked with the European Commission on the control of various diseases, such as swine fever and foot-and-mouth disease.

Lund was a chairman of the Danish Society of Pathology from 1970 to 1976. She was an active member and leader of the Danish Society for Nature Conservation. In 1968 she became a member and leader of the Academy of Engineering Sciences as well as a member of the Society of Sciences in 1978. From 1980 to 1990 Lund was a member of the Executive Board of the Carlsberg Foundation and chairman of the Carlsberg Laboratory. From 1986 to 1990 she was a member of both the National Council for Health Sciences Research and the Ethical Council. Lastly, Lund was chair of the Gene Technology Council from 1986 to 1991.

In 1975, Lund became a Knight of the Dannebrog and in 1984 was appointed to a knight in the first degree. In 1985, she received the Ebbe Muncks Award for her service in the Resistance. She gave an oral history interview about her war time experiences to the United States Holocaust Memorial Museum in 1994.

== Personal life ==
Lund had three children, born in 1945, 1948 and 1951. She first married Professor Soren Lovtrup in 1944, divorcing in 1959. She then married Robert Berridge Dean, the Head of the United States Environmental Protection Agency, in 1978.

Lund died on 21 June 1999 in Copenhagen.
