= Johannes Larsen Flatla =

Norwegian veterinarian (1906–1973)

Johannes Larsen Flatla (11 January 1906 – 1973) was a Norwegian veterinarian.

He was born in Lunner as a son of farmer Lars Flatla (1860–1938) and Kari Horgen (1859–1930). He finished his secondary education in 1925, and graduated from the Royal Veterinary and Agricultural University in 1931. He worked as a veterinarian in Lunner before being hired as an associate professor of pathology at the Norwegian School of Veterinary Science in 1937. He was a professor there from 1947 to 1968, and then director of the National Veterinary Institute from 1968 to his death.

He was also a guest scholar/lecturer at the Norwegian College of Agriculture, in Stockholm, Copenhagen and Cambridge, and a member of the research council NLVF from 1949 to 1959. He was a central board member of the Norwegian Veterinary Association from 1939 and acting secretary-general in the summer of 1945, after World War II.
