= Svend O. Heiberg =

Forester

Svend Oluf Heiberg
- Born: July 22, 1900; Copenhagen, Denmark
- Died: February 5, 1965 (aged 64); Syracuse, New York, U.S.
- Education: Royal Veterinary and Agricultural University; Yale University
- Known for: contributions to world forestry
- Awards: Order of the Dannebrog; honorary doctorate
- Scientific career
- Fields: Silviculture
- Workplaces: State University of New York College of Environmental Science and Forestry

Svend Oluf Heiberg (1900–1965) was a silviculturist, born in Copenhagen, Denmark, on July 22, 1900, educated at Yale University. He came to the United States in 1926, becoming a naturalized US citizen in 1934. Heiberg was Professor of Silviculture, and later Associate Dean for Graduate Studies, at the New York State College of Forestry at Syracuse University in Syracuse, New York. He and his wife, Aasa Gerlach, had two daughters, Lily and Karin, and one son, Eric. Heiberg died on February 5, 1965, in Syracuse.

== Early life and education ==
Heiberg received master's degrees in forestry from both the Royal Veterinary and Agricultural University in Copenhagen, Denmark, and from Yale University.

Originally, Heiberg "intended to enter the Danish Forestry Service in Denmark".

From 1924 to 1925, Heiberg and his friend, Aksel Svane, later to become a lawyer and Governor of Greenland, ventured on an historic world-tour by motorcycle. Interested in studying "the forest reserves... of the world", their route took them from Copenhagen, through Europe to Turkey, from there to Iraq, "by steamer to India", then to Sri Lanka, Malaysia, China, across the United States, and back to Europe.

== Career ==
Heiberg was Professor of Silviculture at the New York State College of Environmental Science and Forestry in Syracuse, New York.

His enthusiasm for soil science carried over from the classroom to the radio airwaves. His broadcast on earthworms made an impression:

In a radio address delivered over WGY Farm Forum, Prof. Svend O. Heiberg... said: 'If your soil is suitable for earthworms... there may be more than two and one-half million per acre, weighing about 1400 pounds. That means that you may have more pounds of earthworms in your employment than all your domestic animals put together.'

In 1959, Heiberg was appointed to the position of Associate Dean for Graduate Studies.

He "is credited with the initial proposal to establish an association of forest landowners in New York State". That initiative bore fruit, resulting in formation of the New York Forest Owners Association.

== Publications ==
- Heiberg, Svend O. 1960. "Postgraduate study for world forestry", Unasylva 14(4). Available: FAO
- Heiberg, Svend O., and Donald P. White. 1951. "Potassium deficiency of reforested pine and spruce stands in northern New York", Soil Science Society of America Proceedings 15: 369–376. Available: Agronomy.org
- Romell, Lars Gunnar, and Svend O. Heiberg. 1931. "Types of humus layer in the forests of northeastern United States", Ecology 12(3):567-608. Available: JSTOR

== Honors ==
- Order of the Dannebrog, by King Frederik IX of Denmark, 1955, for "contributions to world forestry"
- Honorary doctorate, Danish Royal Veterinary and Agricultural College, 1963 - "the first professional forester" and "first American" to receive such an honor

== Legacy ==
- Heiberg Memorial Award, New York Forest Owners Association - recognizing "outstanding contributions to forestry and conservation in New York"
- Svend O. Heiberg Memorial Forest, Tully, New York - "3900 acres in Cortland and Onondaga Counties; Towns of Truxton, Preble, Fabius, and Tully..." providing "a field laboratory setting [for] educational, research and demonstration activities..."
