= Steen Willadsen =

Danish scientist

- Born: 1943 (age 82–83); Copenhagen, Denmark
- Education: Royal Veterinary College of Copenhagen
- Known for: The first cloning of a sheep.
- Awards: Recipient of the Royal Agricultural Society of England's Gold Medal for Research, 1985, and the International Embryo Transfer Society's Pioneer Award, 2005
- Scientific career
- Fields: embryologist

Steen Malte Willadsen (born 1943 in Copenhagen, Denmark) is a Danish biologist credited with being the first to clone a mammal using nuclear transfer.

Willadsen graduated from the Royal Veterinary College of Copenhagen in 1969, and received a PhD in reproductive physiology there in 1973. In 1984, at the British Agricultural Research Council's Institute of Animal Physiology, Cambridge, he successfully used cells from early embryos to clone sheep by nuclear transfer. The procedure he developed was essentially identical to the one used to create Dolly the sheep, although nuclei from a mature sheep were used instead of sheep embryos. Prior to the nuclear transfer experiments, Willadsen had developed methods for freezing sheep and cow embryos, embryo manipulation methods for producing genetically identical animals (primarily identical twins in sheep, cattle, pigs, and horses), and for producing mammalian chimaeras, including interspecies chimaeras.
