= Hørsholm Arboretum =

Coordinates: 55°52′00″N 12°30′27″E

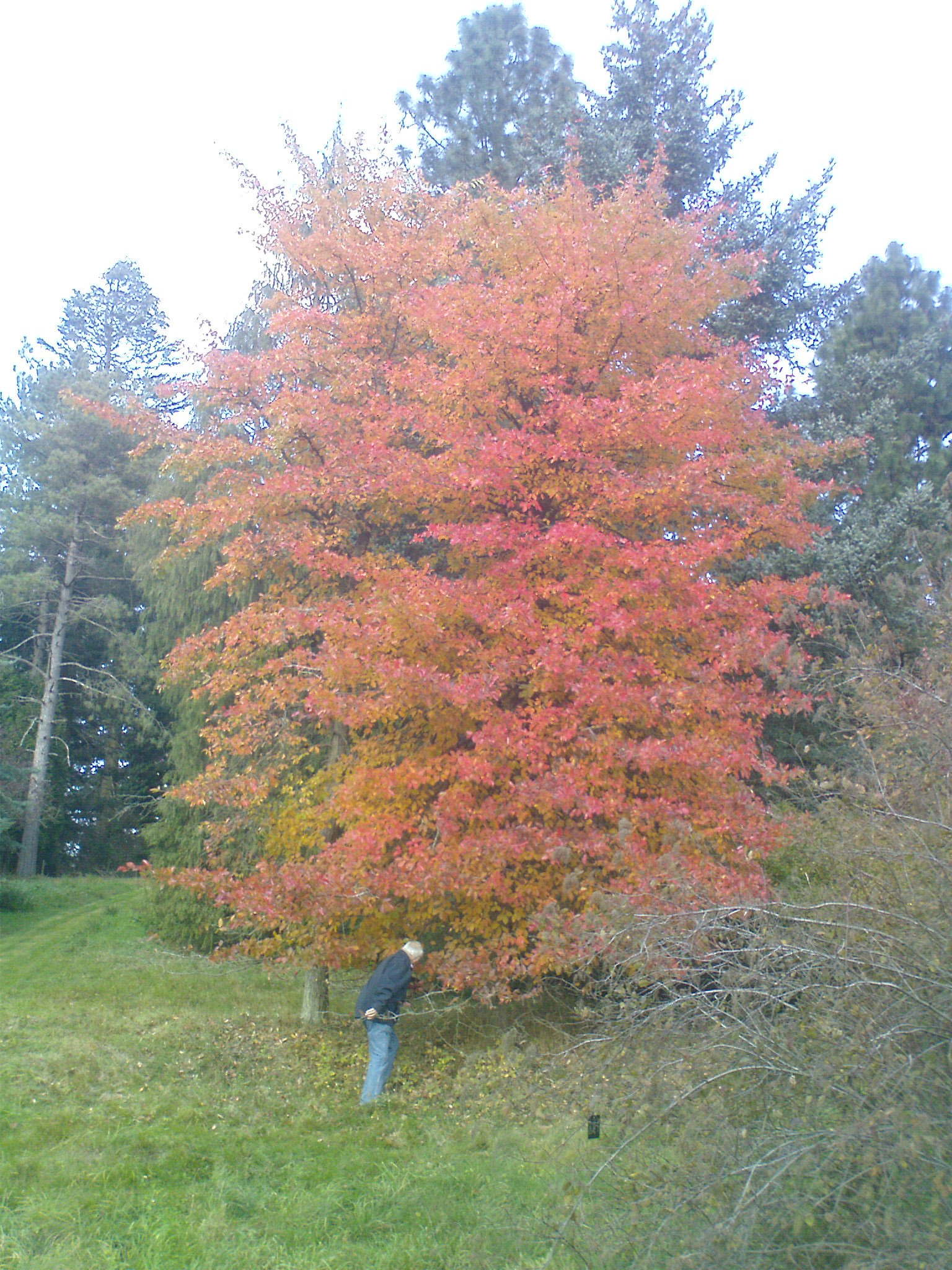
Hørsholm Arboretum Autumn Colors

Hørsholm Arboretum (Danish: Arboretet i Hørsholm) is an arboretum located in Hørsholm, 20 km north of Copenhagen, Denmark. It operates as part of the University of Copenhagen's Department of Geosciences and Natural Resource Management.

== Arboretum ==
Hørsholm Arboretum was established by the Royal Veterinary and Agricultural University in 1936 as an off-site expansion of the Forestry Botanical Garden in Charlottenlund. With its approximately 2 000 species of trees and shrubs, Hørsholm Arboretum is the largest arboretum in Denmark.

== Buildings ==
The Forest & Landscape research center was built in 1994–95 to design by royal building inspector Gehrdt Bornebusch. It has been designed to maximize the views of the arboretum and Ubberød Pond. The use of wood, both elm and pine, plays a prominent role in the architecture. The building was left empty when the activities moved to Copenhagen in 2008 and the national property company Freja Ejendomme took over the buildings in 2011.

== Public access ==
Hørsholm Arboretum is open to the public daily from 6.39 until sunset. It is particularly popular with visitors in May when the extensive collection of wild rhododendron species blossom. The arboretum arranges tours and other events with support from G.B. Hartmanns Forskningsfond.
