= Royal Veterinary and Agricultural University =

Danish university (1856–2007)

- Kongelige Veterinær- og Landbohøjskole
- Type: Public university
- Active: 1856; 170 years ago – 2007; 19 years ago
- Location: Frederiksberg, Denmark
- Successor: University of Copenhagen

The Royal Veterinary and Agricultural University (Danish: Kongelige Veterinær- og Landbohøjskole, KVL; English: Royal Veterinary and Agricultural, RVA) was a veterinary and agricultural science university in Denmark. It was founded in 1856 and operated until 2007, when it became a part of the University of Copenhagen. It had its headquarters in Frederiksberg, Copenhagen.

== History ==
On January 1, 2007, the Royal Veterinary and Agricultural University (RVA University) was merged into the University of Copenhagen and was renamed as the Faculty of Life Sciences. This was later split up, with the veterinary part merging into the Faculty of Health and Medical Sciences and the rest merging into the Faculty of Science.

== Locations ==
=== Main campus ===
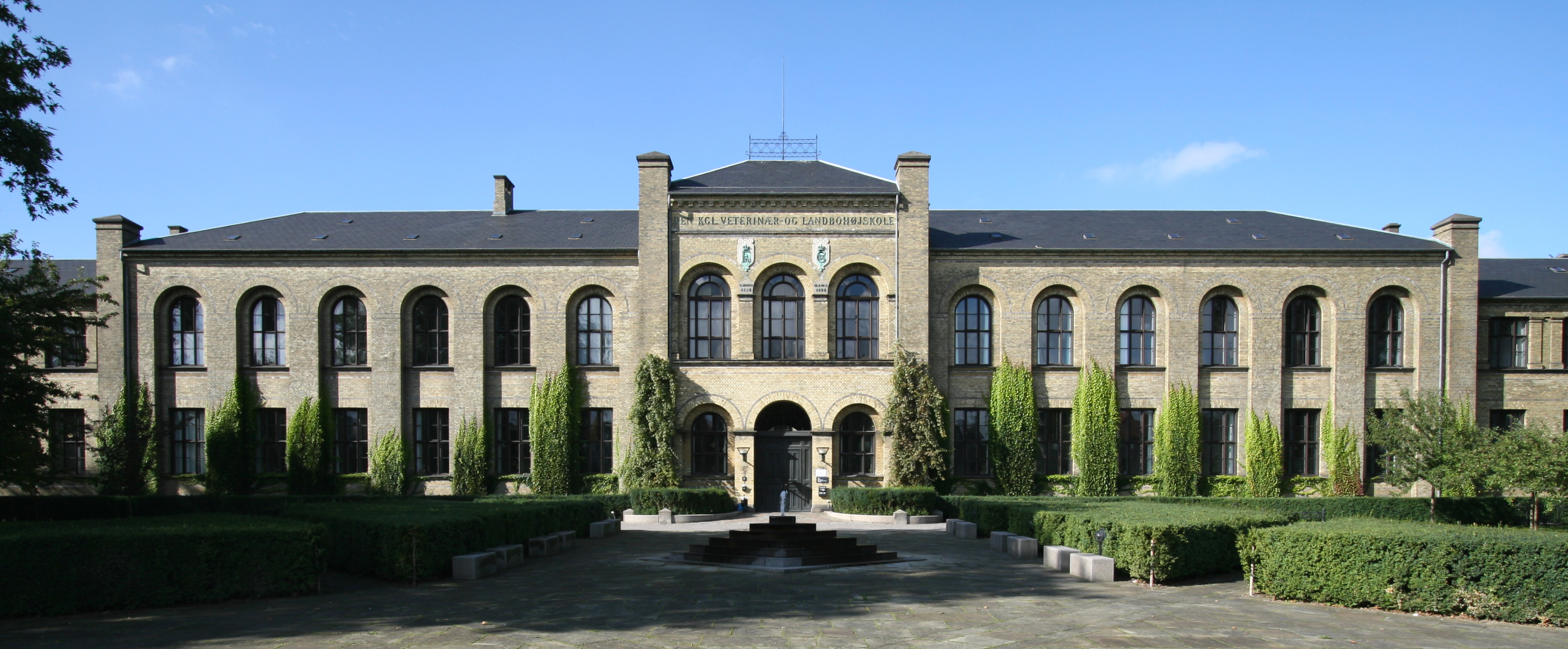
Bülowsvej 17

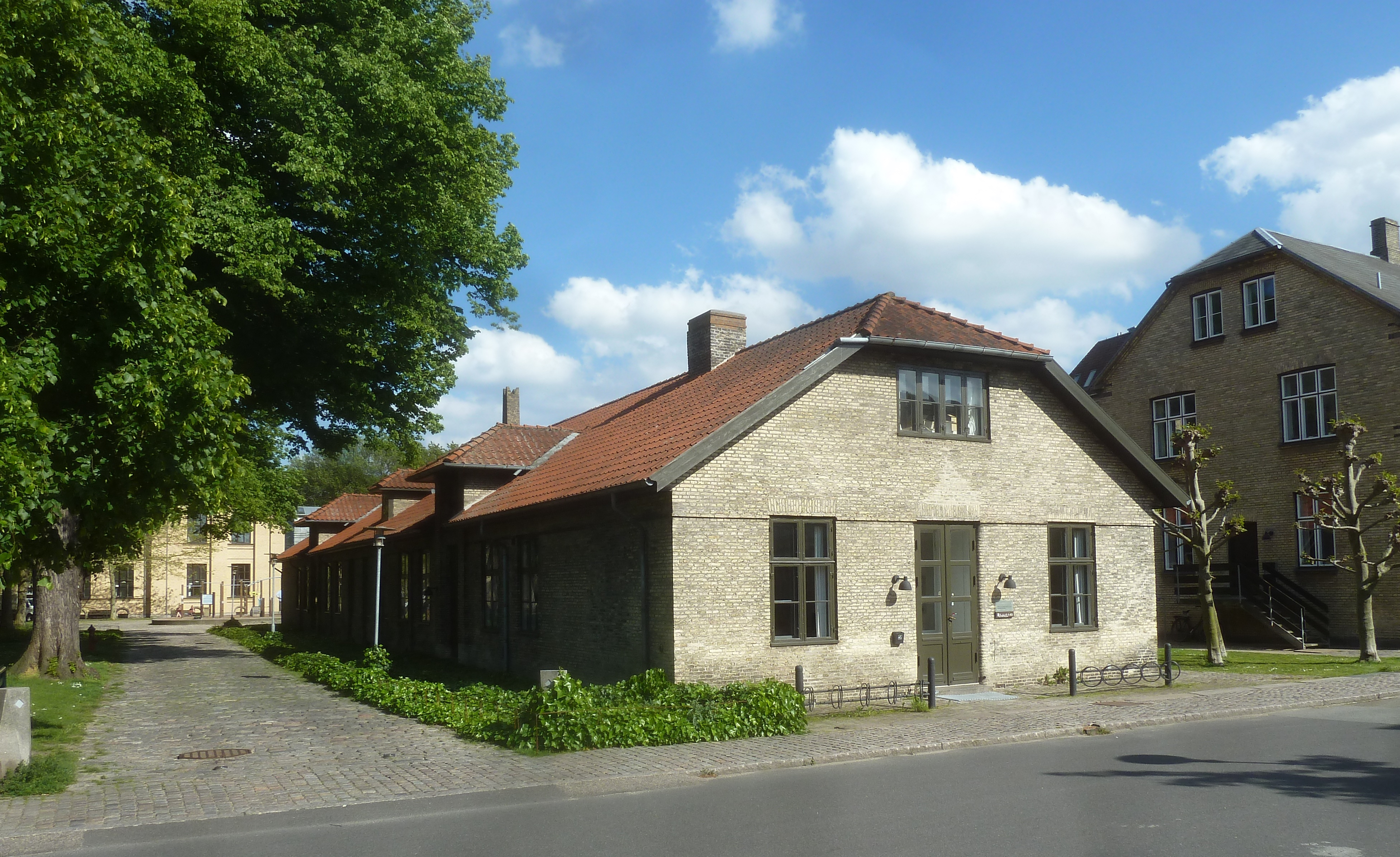
Grønnegårdsvej 8

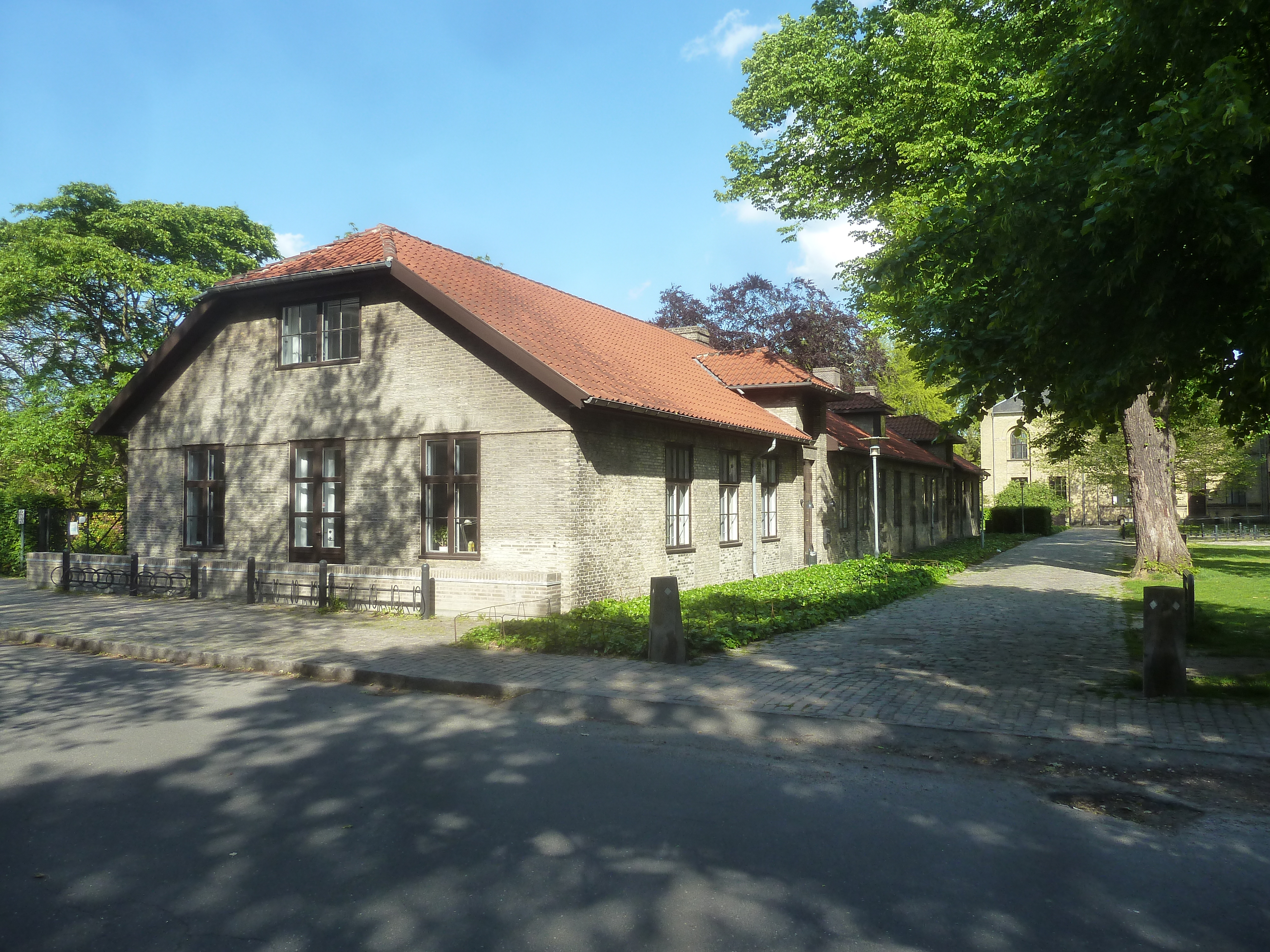
Grønnegårdsvej 10

The original three-winged main building (with the pergola) on Bülowsvej 17 was built between 1856 and 1858 and was designed by Gottlieb Bindesbøll. He also designed two detached wings that were built on Grønnegårdsvej. In 1895, the main building was expanded with a fourth wing (designed by Johannes Emil Gnudtzmann) and a central courtyard.

As of January 2007, the area is part of the University of Copenhagen's Frederiksberg Campus.

=== Other ===
The Royal Veterinary and Agricultural University established the Hørsholm Arboretum in 1936 as an off-site expansion of the Forestry Botanical Garden in Charlottenlund.

== List of notable people ==
=== Alumni ===
- Werner Hosewinckel Christie (1877–1927)
- Svend O. Heiberg (1900–1965)
- Johannes Larsen Flatla (1906–1973)
- Steen Willadsen (1943–)
- Gábor Vajta (1952–)
- Mette Gjerskov (1966–)

=== Faculty ===
- Johan Lange (1818–1898)
- Niels Fjord (1825–1891)
- Emil Rostrup (1831–1907)
- Bernhard Bang (1848–1932)
- Peder Vilhelm Jensen-Klint (1853–1930)
- Wilhelm Johannsen (1857–1927)
- Ebba Lund (1923–1999)
- August Mentz (1867–1944)
- Carl Hansen Ostenfeld (1873–1931)
- Niels Bjerrum (1879–1958)
- Øjvind Winge (1886–1964)
- Jakob Nielsen (1890–1959)
- Jens Clausen (1891–1969)
- Thorvald Sørensen (1902–1973)
