= Forstbotanisk Have =

Coordinates: 55.7498°N 12.5724°E

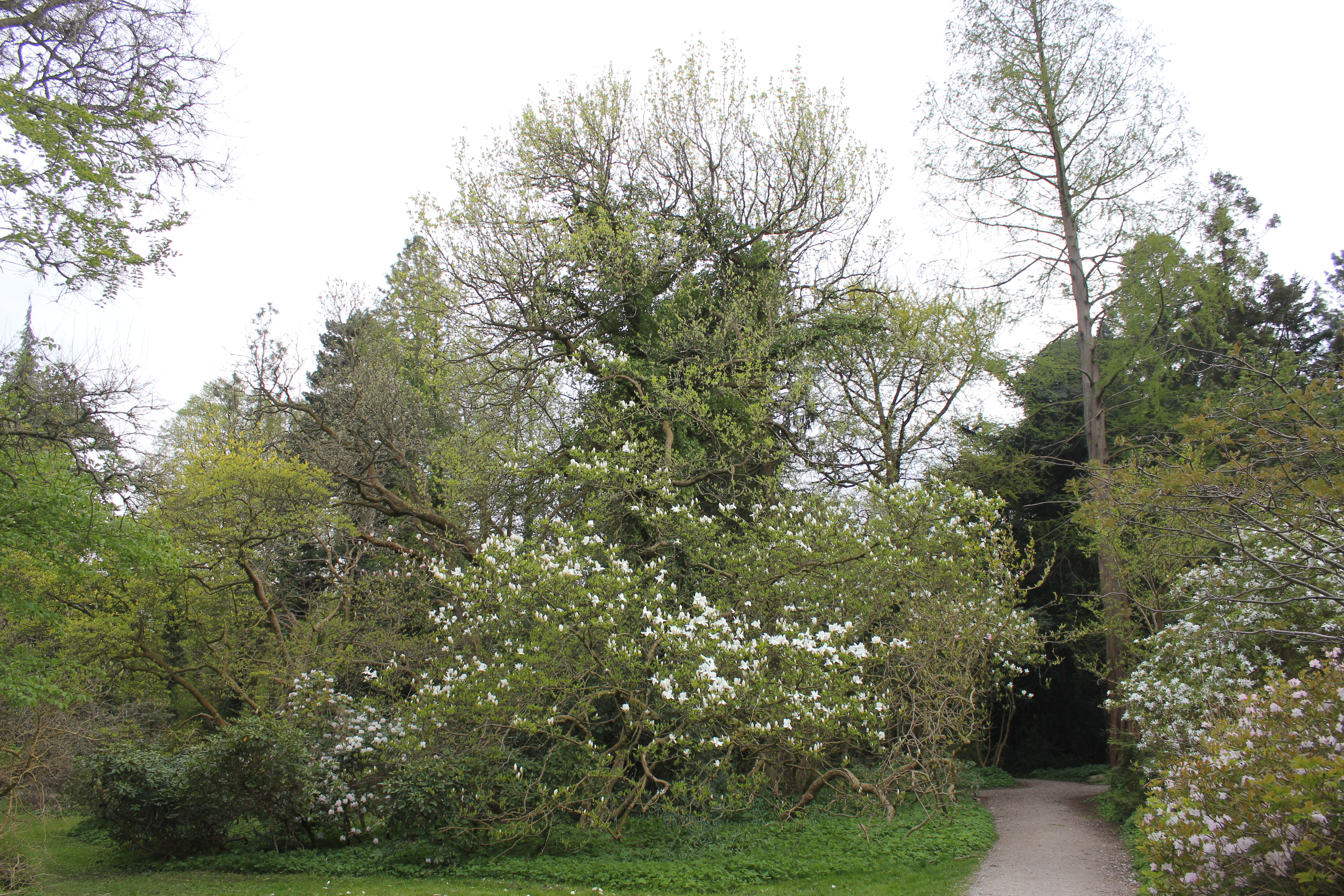
Forstbotanisk Have Charlottenlund

Forstbotanisk Have (lit. "Forestry Botanical Garden"), or Charlottenlund Arboretum was established in 1838 as an educational garden for botanists as part of the University of Copenhagen. It has previously been managed as a unit under the Hørsholm Arboretum, which in turn is operated by the University of Copenhagen's Department of Geosciences and Natural Resource Management. From 2008 until October 2021 it had been managed by the Skov- og Naturstyrelsen ("The Danish Nature Agency"). The land is now rented from the state and maintained by Gentofte Municipality. It is located in the grounds of Charlottenlund Palace north of Copenhagen, Denmark.

It is 3.5 hectares in size and has more than 600 species of trees and plants. It is open to the public for free 24 hours a day.
