= Rørbæk & Møller Arkitekter =

Architectural film in Copenhagen, Denmark

Rørbæk og Møller Arkitekter is a full service architectural firm based in Copenhagen, Denmark, working with new construction, transformation, restoration and planning tasks including building consultancy. Notable projects include Trekroner Church, Holmens Kanal 20, DTU Life Sciences & Bioengineering, N. Zahles Gymnasieskole and the University Teaching Hospital for Large Animals.

Sustainability is a key focus in all projects with many of their buildings receiving a DGNB-certification after completion.

== History ==
Winning the architecture competition in 1949 for Grådybskolen, a primary school in Esbjerg, marked the beginning of a new architectural firm, officially established in 1950. In the early years, they mainly worked on the many new school builds, but the projects soon grew more varied and started including a range of different projects from office, teaching and laboratory facilities to residential and cultural buildings and restoration of conservation-worthy and listed property.

The knowledge and experience accumulated throughout the years has given the firm a position as a trusted architectural and building consultant. They have been chosen for numerous ongoing framework agreements including The Danish Building and Property Agency, Technical University of Denmark and The City of Copenhagen.

== Organization ==
Rørbæk og Møller Arkitekter is currently owned and operated by Nicolai Overgaard and Anders Wesley Hansen, with Nicolai Overgaard also functioning as the managing director.

== Selected projects ==
- Trekroner Church, Roskilde, Denmark (2019)

Rørbæk og Møller Arkitekter designed the new Trekroner church with untraditional shapes and spaces made to fit a more contemporary use of the church. Rounded walls, made on site with in-situ cast concrete, creates an organic soft architectural expression and skylights flood the inside with natural light giving the church an ethereal feel. The church was inaugurated in June 2019.

- Holmens Kanal 20, Copenhagen, Denmark (2019)

Originally designed by architect Frits Schlegel and engineer Ernst Ishøy in the period 1935-1937, Holmens Kanal 20 is an example of Danish functionalist architecture. The property is of high conservation value and the project has been to recreate the original functionalistic features while also giving the users a modern and flexible workspace environment.

- DTU Life Science & Bioengineering, Lyngby, Denmark (2017)

Rørbæk og Møller Arkitekter designed the Life Science & Bioengineering complex, which is the largest building project at Lyngby Campus to date with its 38.800 m2 at 1,2 billion DKK. The building complex is best known for the Biosphere, the large atrium at the center of the complex, where the characteristic oak slats earned Rørbæk og Møller Arkitekter and Christensen & Co the Carpentry award by the Copenhagen Carpentry Guild (Tømrerprisen) in 2017, and the DETAIL Inside Special Prize in 2018. Rørbæk og Møller Arkitekter have also designed DTU Fotonik, DTU Nanotech and various other projects at the DTU Campus in Lyngby.

- Maritime Museum, Randaberg, Norway (competition win, 2015)

Rørbæk og Møller Arkitekter received 1st prize for their museum in an open international architecture competition with 137 entrants in total. Designed like a stylized landscape of sloping surfaces the museum nestles into the coastline of Tungevågen in Randaberg, Norway.

- Department of Geosciences and Natural Resource Management, Copenhagen, Denmark (2013)

The Department complex is an example of a flexible, contemporary new extension, carefully integrated into the existing buildings of great cultural and historic value. Rørbæk og Møller Arkitekter received the Forest and Landscape award in 2011 by Frederiksberg Municipality for the building.

- N. Zahles Gymnasieskole, Copenhagen, Denmark (2012)

With a new roof extension of N. Zahles Gymnasieskole's preserved main building towards Nørreport Station, the school was future-proofed with contemporary teaching facilities. Large glass sections with an external filigree structure of aluminum profiles makes up the facade, inspired by the surrounding trees in the parks and along Nørre Voldgade. Rørbæk og Møller Arkitekter received the ALU Architecture Award 2012 for the project.

- The University Teaching Hospital for Large Animals, Høje Taastrup, Denmark (2008)

The project includes rebuilding existing structures as well as new construction of facilities for teaching, administration and research with varied functions including laboratories, auditoriums, operating rooms and stables. The characteristic roof shape, dominated by large north facing skylights ensures optimal daylight conditions and gives the whole complex a unified architectural identity.
