= List of Danish women writers =

This is a list of women writers who were born in Denmark or whose writings are closely associated with that country.

== A ==
- Karen Aabye (1904–1982), journalist and historical novelist
- Jane Aamund (1936–2019), novelist and journalist
- Merete Ahnfeldt-Mollerup (born 1963), works on architecture
- Naja Marie Aidt (born 1963), poet, novelist and short story writer
- Laura Aller (1849–1917), editor and pioneering magazine publisher at Aller
- Annemette Kure Andersen (born 1962), widely translated poet
- Clara Andersen (1826–1895), playwright and short story writer
- Ellen Andersen (1898–1989), museum curator and textile specialist
- Emilie Andersen (1895–1970), historian and archivist
- Signe Arnfred (born 1944), sociologist specializing in gender studies
- Inga Arvad (1913–1973), journalist

== B ==
- Charlotte Baden (1740–1824), novelist and feminist writer
- Jette Baagøe (born 1946), museum director, botanist and non-fiction writer
- Solvej Balle (born 1962), novelist and poet
- Regitze Barner (1834–1911), philanthropist and writer
- Rigmor Stampe Bendix (1850–1923), baroness, writer and philanthropist
- Dorothea Biehl (1731–1788), playwright
- Johanne Bille (born 1993), novelist
- Louise Bjørnsen (1824–1899), novelist and short story writer
- Jenny Blicher-Clausen (1865–1907), poet and playwright
- Karen Blixen (1885–1962), novelist and memoirist, including Out of Africa
- Sara Blædel (born 1964), crime-fiction novelist
- Bodil Bech (1889–1942), poet
- Cecil Bødker (1927–2020), young-adult fiction
- Sophia Brahe (1556–1643), wrote the genealogy of Danish noble families
- Marie Bregendahl (1867–1940), novelist and writer of realistic rural literature
- Suzanne Brøgger (born 1944), novelist and journalist
- Therese Brummer (1833–1896), children's writer, biographer
- Friederike Brun (1765–1835), poet and travel writer
- Anne Bruun (1853–1934), women's rights activist and editor of Kvinden og Samfundet
- Tine Bryld (1939–2011), novelist
- Julia Butschkow (born 1978), playwright and poet

== C ==
- Franziska Carlsen (1817–1876), writer documenting local history and folklore
- Esther Carstensen (1873–1955), women's rights activist and journal editor
- Mimi Carstensen (1852–1935), philanthropist, journalist and magazine editor
- Inger Christensen (1935–2009), poet, novelist and essayist
- Leonora Christine (1621–1698), writer of memoirs, Denmark's first known woman writer
- Bente Clod (born 1946), poet, novelist and children's writer
- Hedvig Collin (1880–1964), painter, illustrator and children's writer

== D ==
- Ulla Dahlerup (born 1942), journalist, writer and women's rights activist
- Tove Ditlevsen (1917–1976), poet, novelist and short story writer
- Emmy Drachmann (1854–1928), novelist

== E ==
- Elsebeth Egholm (born 1960), popular crime-fiction author and TV screenwriter
- Charlotte Eilersgaard (1858–1922), novelist, playwright and women's rights activist
- Katrine Engberg (born 1975), novelist and actress
- Merete Erbou Laurent (born 1949), weaver, textile artist and magazine editor
- Inge Eriksen (1935–2015), novelist, science fiction, poet and political activist

== F ==
- Astrid Stampe Feddersen (1852–1930), writings in support of women's rights
- Elfride Fibiger (1832–1911), novelist, short story writer and women's emancipation activist
- Ilia Fibiger (1817–1867), playwright, novelist and Denmark's first professional nurse
- Mathilde Fibiger (1830–1872), writings in support of women's rights
- Hanne Finsen (1925–2023), art historian
- Kate Fleron (1909–2006), journal editor and resistance member
- Lone Frank (born 1966), journalist and non-fiction writer
- Kirstine Frederiksen (1845–1903), pedagogue, writer and women's rights advocate
- Astrid Friis (1893–1966), historian and journal editor

== G ==
- Emma Gad (1852–1921), playwright and non-fiction writer
- Sissel-Jo Gazan (born 1973), novelist
- Suzanne Giese (1946–2012), writer and women's rights activist
- Henny Glarbo (1884–1955), archivist
- Luise Gramm (1746–1824), letter writer
- Elsa Gress (1919–1988), essayist, novelist and dramatist
- Anna Grue (born 1957), crime novelist
- Thomasine Gyllembourg (1773–1856), novelist

== H ==
- Marie Hammer (1907–2002), zoologist
- Henriette Hanck (1807–1846), poet and novelist
- Lise Hannestad (born 1943), classical scholar and archaeologist
- Bente Hansen (1940–2022), writer, editor and women's rights activist
- Eva Hemmer Hansen (1913–1983), journalist, novelist, translator and feminist
- Lise Bach Hansen (fl. 2000s), curator, Royal Danish Library
- Kirsten Hastrup (born 1948), anthropologist
- Sonja Hauberg (1918–1947), prominent novelist
- Bettina Hauge (born 1964), anthropologist
- Louise Hegermann-Lindencrone (1778–1853), novelist and short story writer
- Annette Heick (born 1971), journalist
- Johanne Luise Heiberg (1812–1890), writer of memoirs
- Julie Heins (1822–1902), schoolteacher and reading book writer
- Dyveke Helsted (1919–2005), art historian, museum director
- Agnes Henningsen (1868–1962), novelist, short story writer and women's rights activist
- Dagmar Hjort (1860–1902), educator and rights activist
- Greta Hort born Grethe Hjort (1903–1967), professor of Danish and English literature
- Anne Holm (1922–1998), children's writer and journalist
- Gretelise Holm (born 1948), journalist, non-fiction and fiction writer
- Hanne-Vibeke Holst (born 1959), journalist and novelist
- Ellen Hørup (1871–1953), journalist and non-fiction writer on peace and women's rights
- Emma Hørup (1836–1929), journalist and schoolteacher
- Annelise Hovmand (1924–2016), screenwriter
- Anna Hude (1858–1934), historian

== J ==
- Lis Jacobsen (1882–1961), philologist and historian
- Kristine Marie Jensen (1858–1923), early cookbook writer
- Thit Jensen (1876–1957), novelist, playwright and short story writer involved in women's rights
- Thyra Jensen (1865–1949), short story writer, biographer and women's rights activist
- Helga Johansen (1852–1912), novelist associated with the Modern Breakthrough
- Ellen Jørgensen (1877–1948), historian
- Erna Juel-Hansen (1845–1922), novelist, short story writer, feminist and educator
- Teckla Juel (1834–1904), novelist, short story writer and composer of songs

== K ==
- Anne Krabbe (1552–1618), estate owner and writer
- Lene Kaaberbøl (born 1960), children's writer and crime fiction writer
- Janina Katz (1938–2013), Polish-born Danish poet, novelist and children's writer
- Lisbeth Knudsen (born 1953), journalist, editor-in-chief and businesswoman
- Lene Koch (born 1947), gender studies researcher and historian
- Nynne Koch (1915–2001), novelist, autobiographer and gender studies researcher
- Birgithe Kosovic (born 1972), journalist and autobiographer on Yugoslavia

== L ==
- Margrethe Lasson (1659–1738), author of Denmark's first novel
- Cornelia von Levetzow (1836–1921), popular novelist
- Olivia Levison, (1847–1894), author and writer
- Mette Lisby (born 1968), writer, actress, comedian and television host, now in the United States
- Anne Marie Løn (born 1947), novelist
- Hansigne Lorenzen (1879–1952), novelist and poet from Southern Jutland
- Anna Christiane Ludvigsen (1794–1884), poet from Southern Jutland
- Bodil Jerslev Lund (1919–2005), Danish chemist and educator
- Hulda Lütken (1896–1946), poet and novelist

== M ==
- Sofie Madsen (1897–1982), educator of autistic children
- Anne Marie Mangor (1781–1865), early cookbook writer
- Alfhilda Mechlenburg (1830–1907), novelist and short story writer
- Karin Michaëlis (1872–1950), journalist, novelist and children's writer
- Else Holmelund Minarik (1920–2012), U.S. immigrant, author of the Little Bear series of children's books
- Johanne Meyer (1838–1915), pioneering Danish suffragist, pacifist, journal editor and writer
- Eva Moltesen (1871–1934), Finnish-Danish writer and peace activist
- Else Moltke (1888–1986), writer on historical figures
- Herdis Møllehave (1936–2001), social worker and novelist
- Dea Trier Mørch (1941–2001), novelist and writer on women and childbirth
- Johanne Münter (1844–1921), writer and women's rights activist
- Elna Mygdal (1868–1940), textile researcher, museum director and writer

== N ==
- Bodil Neergaard (1867–1959), landowner, philanthropist and memoirist
- Henriette Nielsen (1815–1900), novelist and playwright
- Maria Nielsen (1882–1931), historian and educator
- Lise Nørgaard (1917–2023), novelist, screenwriter and author of TV series Matador
- Marianne Nøhr Larsen (born 1963), anthropologist and writer
- Louise Nyholm Kallestrup (born 1975), historian

== O ==
- Annette K. Olesen (born 1965), screenwriter
- Voldborg Ølsgaard (1877–1939), editor of Fred og Frihed
- Tania Ørum (born 1945), literary historian, gender studies specialist
- Elise Otté (1818–1903), Anglo-Danish philologist and historian
- Estrid Ott (1900–1967), prolific children's writer

== P ==
- Hortense Panum (1856–1933), music historian
- Sophie Petersen (1885–1965), geographer
- Louise von Plessen (1725–1799), court memoirist
- Birgitte Possing (born 1952), historian, biographer and feminist

== Q ==
- Hedevig Quiding (1867–1936), opera singer, music critic, journalist, educator
- Anne Margrethe Qvitzow (1652–1700), poet, translator and memoirist

== R ==
- Ingeborg Raunkiær (1863–1921), novelist and article writer
- Olga Ravn (born 1986), poet and novelist
- Adda Ravnkilde (1862–1883), Danish novelists
- Frederikke Charlotte Reventlow (1747–1822), countess, author and letter writer
- Julie Reventlow (1763–1816), salonnière and non-fiction writer
- Jytte Rex (born 1942), novelist and writer on women's rights
- Ane Riel (born 1971), novelist and winner of the Glass Key award
- Ivan Ring, pen name of Alfhilda Mechlenburg (1830–1907)
- Signe Rink (1836–1909), Greenland-born Danish writer and ethnologist
- Anna-Grethe Rischel (born 1935), paper historian
- Edith Rode (1879–1956), novelist and journalist
- Else Roesdahl (born 1942), historian and specialist on Vikings
- Caja Rude (1884–1949), novelist and women's rights activist

== S ==
- Astrid Saalbach (born 1955), playwright and novelist
- Vibeke Salicath (1861–1921), philanthropist, feminist, politician and women's journal editor
- Lotte Salling (born 1964), children's writer
- Charlotte Sannom (1846–1923), writer and missionary
- Else Kai Sass (1912–1987), art historian
- Bente Scavenius (born 1944), art critic and author
- Rikke Schubart (born 1966), novelist and writer on film and television
- Alba Schwartz (1857–1942), novelist
- Ingeborg Maria Sick (1858–1951), novelist and biographer
- Birte Siim (born 1945), political scientist specializing in gender studies
- Sanne Søndergaard (born 1980), novelist and stand-up comedian
- Anna Louise Stevnhøj (born 1963), non-fiction writer on children and health
- Maria Engelbrecht Stokkenbech (1759–after 1806), feminist and autobiographer
- Fanny Suenssen (1832–1918), novelist and short story writer
- Ingeborg Suhr Mailand (1871–1989), educator and cookbook writer
- Karin-Lis Svarre (1946–2009), television journalist and writer
- Hanne Marie Svendsen (born 1933), non-fiction writer and novelist
- Karen Syberg (born 1945), writer, gender researcher and feminist

== T ==
- Pia Tafdrup (born 1952), poet
- Janne Teller (born 1964), philosophical novelist
- Mette Thomsen (born 1970), novelist
- Magdalene Thoresen (1819–1903), Danish-born Norwegian poet and novelist
- Kirsten Thorup (born 1942), novelist, poet and screenwriter
- Eleonora Tscherning (1817–1890), memoirist and painter
- Fanny Tuxen (1832–1906), children's writer

== U ==
- Leonora Christina Ulfeldt (1621–1698), autobiographer

== V ==
- Alice Vestergaard (born 1937), journalist, newspaper editor, television news coordinator
- Vibeke Vasbo (born 1944), novelist, poet, women's activist and former member of Danish Lesbian Movement

== W ==
- Emilie West (1844–1907), schoolteacher and needlework proponent
- Lise Warburg (born 1932), textile artist and writer
- Dorrit Willumsen (born 1940), poet, novelist and short story writer
- Mette Winge (1937–2022), novelist, literary critic
- Pauline Worm (1825–1883), writer, poet, schoolteacher and feminist

== See also ==
- List of Faroese women writers
- List of Danish writers
- List of women writers
