= Elsebeth =

Elsebeth is a Danish female given name. It is the Danish form of Elizabeth. Notable people with this name include:

- Elsebeth Brehm (1901-1995), Danish tennis player
- Elsebeth Budolfsen (born 1947), Danish pharmacist
- Elsebeth Egholm (born 1960), Danish author
- Elsebeth Gerner Nielsen (born 1960), Danish politician
- Elsebeth Kock-Petersen (born 1949), Danish politician
- Elsebeth Mercedis Gunnleygsdóttur (born 1963), Faroese politician
