= Signe Arnfred =

Danish sociologist

Signe Arnfred (born 1944) is a Danish sociologist, feminist and writer who in 1971 became closely involved in Danish feminist activities. A leading figure in the Red Stocking Movement, she organized and participated in meetings and seminars which formed the basis of gender studies in Denmark. In the 1980s. together with her husband she spent four years in Mozambique where she was instrumental in developing a new approach to women in politics. In the late 1980s and early 1990s she was also active in Greenland. Arnfred has published books and articles addressing the place of women in society.

== Early life, family and education ==
Born in Nykøbing Sjælland on 22 January 1944, Signe Arnfred is the daughter of the specialist physician Axel Helweg Arnfred (1915–2004) and his wife Asta Julie née Busck, a social worker. In 1989, she married the architect Jan Birket-Smith (born 1945) with whom she has two children: Anne Julie (1977) and Katrine (1980).

Raised in closely-knit family, Arnfred completed her high school education at Copenhagen's Akademisk Studenterkursus in 1962. She spent the next two years travelling in Scandinavia, teaching in Jutland and working as a maid in Italy. In 1964, she began to study philosophy at Aarhus University but then moved to the University of Copenhagen where she earned a master's in cultural sociology in 1973. She went on to spend a further period of study at Makerere University in Kampala, Uganda.

== Career ==
Back in Denmark, in 1971 she became a member of the feminist organization Kvindebevægelsen and helped to arrange the key weekend gathering in Tåstrup in January 1972 which brought together some 250 women from Copenhagen and the Danish provinces. Her resulting contacts with the Red Stocking Movement led to her adopting a Marxist-feminist approach to sociology. During the 1970s, she was instrumental in organizing a series of meetings and seminars in support of the women's movement and women's studies, paving the way for the development of gender studies as a branch of academic study. In this connection, she wrote several books. Together with Karen Syberg, in 1974 she published Kvindesituation og kvindebevægelse under kapitalismen (Women's Situation and Women's Movement under Capitalism). She was appointed an assistant professor at Roskilde University in 1974, becoming an associate professor in 1977.

In 1980, she moved with her husband and children to Mozambique where she worked with the women's organization until 1984, bringing about a new approach to women in politics. In 1988, they moved to Greenland where she taught sociology at the University of Greenland, subsequently coordinating the publication of Kvinder i Grønland (Women in Greenland, 1991). Arnfeld has maintained a continued interest in Africa, revisiting Mozambique and working as a consultant in Harare, Zimbabwe. In 2011, she published Sexuality and Gender Politics in Mozambique: Rethinking Gender in Africa, receiving positive reviews.
