= Bech (surname) =

Bech is a surname. Notable people with the surname include:

- Bodil Bech (1889–1942), Danish poet
- Gitte Lillelund Bech (born 1969), Danish politician
- Henry Bech, a fictional character in the writings of John Updike
- Jack Bech (born 2002), American football player
- Jerome Bech (born 1970), Danish painter
- Jesper Bech (born 1982), Danish football (soccer) player
- Joseph Bech (1887–1975), Luxembourgish politician
- Lili Bech (1883–1939), Danish actress
- Poul Anker Bech (1942–2009), Danish painter
- Tobias Bech (born 2002), Danish footballer
- Troels Bech (born 1966), Danish football player and manager
- Uffe Bech (born 1993), Danish footballer
- Zoe Bech (1910–2006), American actress
