= Bente Hansen =

Danish editor and women's rights activist (1940–2022)

- Born: March 4, 1940; Kolding, Denmark
- Education: University of Copenhagen (MA, 1966)
- Occupations: Writer, editor, women's rights activist
- Known for: Danish Red Stocking Movement
- Title: Coordinating editor of Information
- Movement: Socialism, Feminism
- Relatives: Litten Hansen (sister)

Bente Hansen (4 March 1940 – April 2022) was a Danish writer, editor and women's rights activist who was a prominent supporter of the Danish Red Stocking Movement from 1970. She published a number of books on socialism and the role of women and was coordinating editor of the daily newspaper Information in the mid-1970s, giving special attention to social movements.

== Biography ==
Born on 4 March 1940 in Kolding, Hansen was the daughter of the veterinarian Hans Kristian Hansen and Grethe Vera Nornild, a teacher. Her sister was Litten Hansen.

After matriculating from Vestjsk Gymnasium in Tarm, she spent a year in Brussels, returning to Denmark to study literature at the University of Copenhagen. From 1961 to 1966, she was influenced by the strong women's traditions of Kvinderegensen, the women's college where she stayed. She received her M.A. in 1966.

On the political front, she was influenced by a group of students from the Soviet Union she met in 1959, becoming an active left-wing socialist and a member of the Socialist People's Party. A talented orator, she was a strong supporter of free abortion and equal pay, causes she also developed as editor of the bimonthly journal Politisk Revy from 1966. From 1970, thanks to contacts with Ninon Schloss, she consistently devoted a column to the Red Stocking Movement. Over the next 15 years, she became one of the unofficial leaders of the women's movement in Denmark, participating in the gathering on the island of Femø in 1971. Together with Vibeke Vasbo and Mette Knudsen, she drafted a number of documents which became the ideology of the Red Stockings. She was the main speaker at the first women's meeting in Copenhagen's Fælledparken in 1975.

Her role as an editor at Information from 1976, where she was one of just three women editors opposed by 33 men, proved too difficult, leading to her resignation in 1977. She nevertheless continued as a commentator at BT. She later participated in developing a major television series on women in the labour movement, broadcast in 1986. By 1990, as a result of exhaustion and increasingly poor health, she had to cut back on her activities.

Hansen died in April 2022 after prolonged illness.

== Selected publications ==
Hansen published the following books in Danish:

- Den marxistiske litteraturkritik (1967)
- Kapitalisme, socialisme, kommunisme (1969)
- Kunst og kapitalisme (1971)
- Kvinderne fra Herning (1971)
- Det lille røde leksikon (1974)
- Forfattere i/mod kapitalismen (1975)
- Dengang i 60’erne (1978)
- I virkeligheden - poems (1980)
- Fuglen Herbert Jørgensen - children's book (1990)
- Kommer til live - poems (1993)
- Til den som elsker en narkoman - conversations with those concerned (1995)
- En køn historie - (2004)
- Gud og hvermand - (2008)
- Det kimer nu til julefest - (2011)
- Historien Findes - (2014)
