= Heins =

Heins is a surname. Notable people with the surname include:

- Christopher Heins (died 1689), lieutenant and interim Governor-General of The Danish West Indies
- Donald Heins (1878–1949), Canadian violinist, violist, conductor, organist, composer, and music educator
- Henry Hardy Heins (1923–2003), American Lutheran minister, historian and bibliographer
- Julie Heins (1822–1902), Danish writer
- Marjorie Heins, activist and writer
- Maurice Heins (1915–2015), American mathematician
- Ryan Heins (born 1985), American soccer player
- Shawn Heins (born 1973), ice hockey player
- Thorsten Heins (born 1957), German telecommunications executive

== See also ==
- Heins & LaFarge, architect George Lewis Heins (1860–1907) and Christopher Grant LaFarge (1862–1938)
