= Rischel =

Rischel is a surname. Notable people with the surname include:

- Anna-Grethe Rischel (born 1935), Danish paper conservator and paper historian
- Jørgen Rischel (1934–2007), Danish linguist

== See also ==
- Ruschel
