= Lesbian Movement (Denmark) =

Danish lesbian organization

The Lesbian Movement (Danish: Lesbisk Bevægelse) was a Danish organization for lesbians established in 1974 in Copenhagen by a group of women including Vibeke Vasbo who were unhappy about the degree of intolerance towards lesbians in the Danish Redstocking Movement.

The Movement was Denmark's first lesbian organization. It was established on 10 March 1974 by a group of women from Rødstrømpebevægelsen (The Red Stocking Movement) together with a smaller group from the homosexual organization Forbundet af 1948 (The 1948 Association). The main reason for setting the organization up was that a number of lesbians found that members of the Red Stocking Movement were not ready to accept their identity and their problems. They had even been called a group of "lesbian men haters".

Like the Red Stockings, the Lesbian Movement consisted of several freely organized groupings, without any specific management structure. While the Copenhagen group was the largest, there were active sections throughout the country. In addition to general support for women's rights, the Movement strove for progress on lesbian rights. By means of courses and publications, they encouraged lesbians to become more open and visible and to fight discrimination against them. Despite their differences, they conducted much of their work in collaboration with the Red Stockings, becoming part of the evolving feminist movement in the 1970s. As a result, many of their individual activities were shut down. In 1985, the Movement was dissolved.

The Lesbian Movement's main publications were Kvinder-Kvinder (Women-Women, 1972–78) and Hvidløgspressen (The Garlick Press, 1982–86). In the 1970s, they congregated at summer camps on the islands of Femø and Sejerø.
