= Red Stocking Movement (Denmark) =

Danish women's rights movement

The Red Stocking Movement (Danish: Rødstrømpebevægelsen) was a Danish women's rights movement which was established in 1970 and was active until the mid-1980s. Inspired by the Redstockings founded in 1969 in New York City, it brought together left-wing feminists who fought for the same rights as men in terms of equal pay but it also addressed treatment of women in the workplace as well as in the family.

== Background ==
In the late 1960, a group of young women activists from the Danish Women's Society supported by cultural and university organizations such as Kanonklubben and Kældergruppen, were inspired by the New York Redstockings to set up Denmark's own Red Stocking Movement. Among the most active were Ninon Schoss, Karen Syberg and Vibeke Vasbo. In connection with the weekly parade of the Danish Life Guards in central Copenhagen on 8 April 1970, a group of women intervened, discarding their clothes and joining women from the Tuborg brewery who were demonstrating for equal pay.

Initially there was considerable confusion, even in the press, about what the women stood for but slowly they explained their position in articles such as En historie om hvordan rødstrømperne blev rødstrømper (The Story of how Red Stockings became Red Stockings). Initial emphasis was on demonstrations calling for equal pay and free abortion, but they were also active on the political front, opposing Denmark's membership of the European Community.

== Development ==
While the initial impetus was on urban membership in Copenhagen, Aarhus and Odense, by the mid-1970s, the movement had spread to towns throughout Denmark. There was no defined hierarchical structure, each grouping organizing its own activities. Festivities and celebrations of all kinds were arranged, including summer camps on the island of Femø and the establishment of the Women's Museum in Aarhus.

A number of disputes evolved over the years, mainly in connection with organization but increasingly with lesbian members who broke away and formed their own Lesbian Movement. By the 1980s, interest in the movement began to wane. In 1985, the Aarhus Redstockings formally closed their organization.

Despite a relatively short period of activity, the Danish Red Stockings contributed to legislation on free abortion (1973), equal pay (1976) and improvements in maternity leave (1980). The movement was also successful in encouraging universities to undertake research on women, now known as gender research, and the establishment of KVINFO, the Danish Center for Research on Women and Gender.

== Influential members ==
Active members of the organization included Ulla Dahlerup (born 1942), Drude Dahlerup (born 1945), Suzanne Giese (1946–2012), Bente Hansen (1940–2022), Litten Hansen (born 1944), Karen Jespersen (born 1947), Karen Syberg (born 1945) and Vibeke Vasbo (born 1944).
