= Birgitte Thott =

17th-century Danish scholar

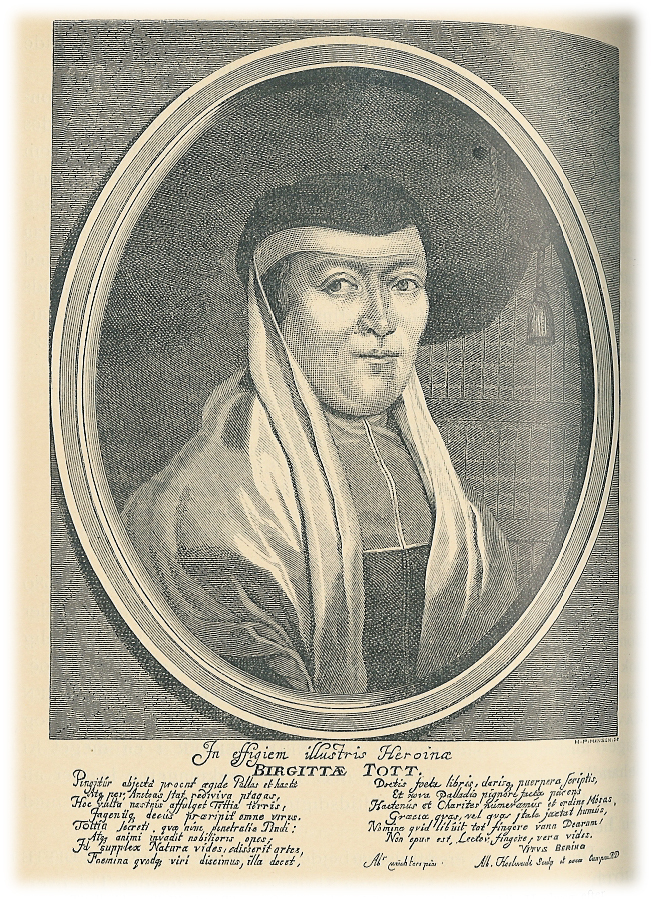
Birgitte Thott

Birgitte (Bridget) Thott (17 June 1610 – 8 April 1662) was a Danish writer, scholar and feminist, known for her learning. She was fluent and literate in Latin (her main area of study) along with many other languages. She translated many published works into Danish, including a 1,000-page translation of Latin moral philosopher Seneca.

== Life ==
Birgitte was born in 1610 to the nobleman Christen Thott and Sophie Below in Turebygård. She was the sister of Henrik Thott (1606–1676). Thott lost her father at only 6 years old. Her mother was a learned woman who had a special interest in genealogy, and who educated Birgitte and her sisters in language (German, French, English, and Spanish) and literature. Being educated by learned parents was the only real way for young girls to receive any sort of education in Denmark at the time. Nonetheless, Birgitte also had contact with Holger Rosenkrantz, whose Schloss Rosenholm provided girls and boys with an education which included a focus on ancient philolosophy and critical distance from the Lutheran orthodoxy of the Danish state church.

Thott married Otto Giøe in 1632 at the age of 22, but he died ten years later due to illness surrounding a gunshot wound. The two did not have any children. Despite not having any biological children of her own, Birgitte Thott was responsible for fostering two children that we know of: Elisabeth and Sophie.

== Career ==
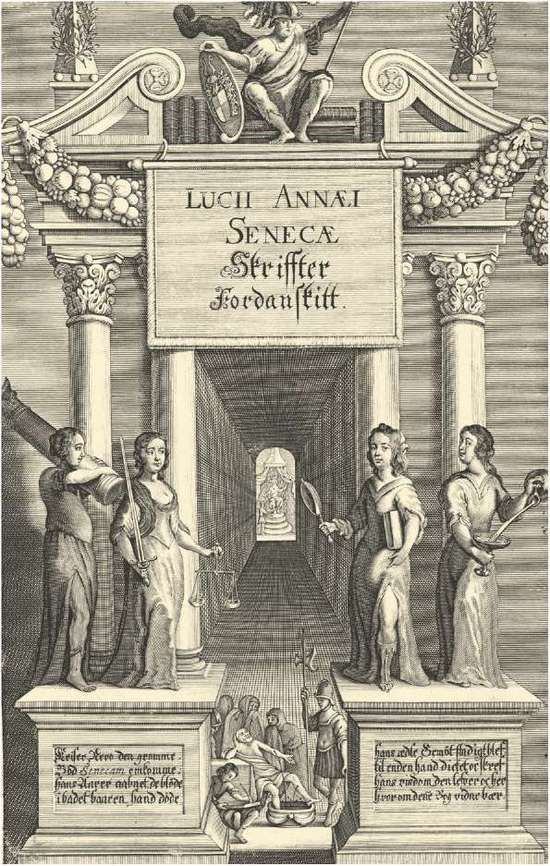
Title page from Thott's translation of Seneca's works into Danish. Birgitte Thott's name is not mentioned but she is shown AS Minerva wearing a helmet at the top of the page

She is most famous for her translation of moral philosopher Seneca’s Philologus in 1658 from Latin to Danish. The enormous undertaking of the Seneca translation ended up being 1,000 pages. This translation was the first of its kind, and introduced a new cultural and religious conversation to the Danish audience. The translation also introduced new words into the Danish language.

Though being proficient in Latin, Birgitte Thott did not write any Latin of her own, rather, she focused on translating. "Contemporary sources report that she before her death mastered Danish, German, Dutch, English, French, Italian, Spanish, Latin, Greek and Hebrew, of which her knowledge of German, English, French and Latin can be confirmed through preserved translations from her hand."

She resumed and recommitted to her studies after her husband's death. In 1660, Birgitte Thott was given permission by the King to receive an annual grant from the Soro Academy to pursue her studies, expand her library, and research language. This was achieved with the assistance of Jørgen Rosenkrantz.

Thott was part of a rather small European network of approximately 100–150 learned women including Christina Queen of Sweden, Marie le Jars du Gournay (in France), Bathsua Makin (in England) and Dorothea Moore (in Ireland), and Anna Maria van Schurman. She became a well respected woman in the Danish scholarly community, despite not having a public "profession". She was one of the first defenders of women's rights in Scandinavia.

== Tributes ==
Feminist artist Judy Chicago completed an installation art piece called The Dinner Party in 1979, currently on display at the Brooklyn Museum. There are 39 place settings around a table for 39 significant mythological and historical women. The porcelain tile floor; the Heritage floor, is inscribed in gold with 999 additionally notable women. Birgitte Thott is included among these women under the name Bridget Thott.

In translating Seneca, Thott praised the Romans for asserting that women, as well as men, should be honored and praised for their life accomplishments in funeral orations. In this vein, Professor Jørgen Rosenkrantz wrote Birgitte Thott a funeral address which has been preserved. It tells of her life and many achievements.

Quote from Rozenkrantz’ funeral orations:

So, at thirty-one years of age, guided by eminent teachers, she embarked upon learning the Latin language, which today is studied far and wide by scholars, and the result was so good that she could very soon express whatsoever thought she so wished in that language. In order to acquire the innermost meaning of the Holy Scripture she later worked – not without yield and exceptional progress – with the Hebrew language, which is the language employed by God to impart His Word to the patriarchs and the prophets, and in which the canonical writings of the Old Testament were originally rendered. She was perfectly aware that water has one taste at its source and another down the river.

Anna Maria van Shurman wrote one of twelve introductory poems for Thott’s translation of Seneca’s Philologus in which she referred to Birgitte as the tenth muse, which was a praise-worthy term for learned women at the time.

== Unpublished achievements ==
Birgitte Thott also wrote a personal manuscript or "treatise" of two hundred pages titled Om et lyksaligt liv (On a Happy Life). In this, she asserts that even if women are not exposed to learning other languages, they should have access to literary works from other cultures via translation. This was the driving force behind her life's work.

Quotes from On a Happy Life:

On young girls not being encouraged to have an education:

No one whets their appetite to the sweetness found there. No one tells them what delicious food there is for the soul, what effective remedy against all their frailties it is to have a little understanding of bad and good. There are many, and this I have heard often, who would rather impress upon young maidens that poring over books will make them objects of derision.

On education for young boys:

But young male children are treated completely differently. They are enticed into study by the reward and honour they are told they can thereby attain; [...] they are impelled to attend school by their parents or guardians whether they like it or not. There are so many learned men who sweat and toil to educate and teach them [...] neither exertion nor expense is spared at the institutions of education [...] in order to lead the students onwards.

== See also ==
- Anne Margrethe Bredal
- Anne Margrethe Qvitzow

== Bibliography ==
- Alenius, Marianne. "Thott, Birgitte." The History of Nordic Women's Literature. Accessed May 11, 2016. http://nordicwomensliterature.net/writer/thott-birgitte.
- Alenius, Marianne. "With One Foot in the Grave I Should Continue to Read." The History of Nordic Women's Literature. 2012. Accessed May 10, 2016. http://nordicwomensliterature.net/article/one-foot-grave-i-should-continue-read.
- Bech, Svend Cedergreen, Povl Engelstoft, Svend Dahl, and Carl Frederik Bricka. Dansk Biografisk Leksikon. 3rd ed. Vol. 1. København: Gyldendal, 1979.
- Beek, Pieta Van, and Anna-Mart Bonthuys. The First Female University Student: Anna Maria Van Schurman (1636). Utrecht: Igitur, 2010.
- Bruun, Henry. 2011. "Sophie Below." Dansk Biografisk Leksikon.
- Too, Yun Lee, and Niall Livingstone. Pedagogy and Power: Rhetorics of Classical Learning. Cambridge, Cambridge University Press, 2007.
