= Ruschel =

Ruschel is a surname. Notable people with the surname include:

- Alan Ruschel (born 1989), Brazilian footballer
- Alberto Ruschel (1918–1996), Brazilian actor, producer, and director
- Livonir Ruschel (born 1979), Brazilian footballer

== See also ==
- Rischel
