= Litten Hansen =

Danish actress, activist and politician (b. 1944)

- Born: 24 December 1944 (age 81); Videbæk, Midtjylland, Denmark
- Education: University of Copenhagen
- Organization(s): Danish Anti-Apartheid Committee; Danish Actors' Association; National Theatre Council
- Political party: Left Socialists
- Movement: Red Stocking Movement
- Relatives: Bente Hansen (sister)

Litten Hansen (born 24 December 1944) is a Danish former film and television actress, activist, politician and member of the Danish Parliament for the Left Socialists.

== Family ==
Hansen was born 24 December 1944 in Videbæk in Midtjylland, Denmark. Her father was veterinarian Hans Kristian Hansen and her mother was teacher Grethe Vera Hansen (née Nornild). She was the fifth of eight sisters and her parents separated when she was a child. Her father was an alcoholic.

Hansen married Knud Hauge in 1992. He died 2000.

== Career ==
When she was sixteen, Hansen moved to Copenhagen and found a job at a travel agency, working as a bilingual correspondent. She then enrolled as a student at the Statens Kursus in 1965. She also studied at the University of Copenhagen.

Aged 27, Hansen began a career as a stage actress, becoming known for the monologue The Mother and the Women in Russia, before performing in films. She was a talented tap dancer as a child.

Hansen became active in the Danish Red Stocking Movement with her sister, Bente Hansen (1940-2022), which brought together left-wing feminists who fought for the same rights as men in terms of equal pay. She was also offered the position of secretary of the Danish Anti-Apartheid Committee, due to her organising and administration experience, and fought in solidarity with black South Africans against the apartheid regime.

Hansen then became involved in party politics, serving on he executive board of the Left Socialists (VS) from 1968. Between 1975 and 1977 she served as member in the Folketing (Parliament of Denmark).

Hansen returned to her career in the arts after her time in Parliament. She was the first female chairman of the Danish Actors' Association trade union and held the position for nine years. She was a board member and the chair of the Royal Danish Theatre's National Theatre Council from 1995 to 1999.

== Filmography ==
=== Film ===
- 1975: Ta' det som en mand, frue [da]
- 1986: Early Spring
- 1993: Stolen Spring
- 2003: Move Me

=== Television ===
- 1978: Er det løgn hva' jeg si'r?
- 1987: Nana [da]
- 1989: Kirsebærhaven 89
- 1990-1991: Ugeavisen [da]
