= Vibeke Vasbo =

Danish women's rights and LGBT activist

Vibeke Vasbo (born 9 July 1944) is a Danish writer and women's rights and LGBT rights activist. In the early 1970s, she participated in the Redstocking movement and in the Danish Lesbian Movement. She embarked on a literary career in 1976 with Al den løgn om kvinders svaghed (All those Lies about Women's Weakness) expanding on the work of a woman crane driver, based on her experiences in Oslo in 1974-75.

== Biography ==
Born on 9 July 1944 on the Danish island of Als, she was the daughter of medical doctors Harald Eyvind Roesdahl (1912–94) and Anna Helene Refslund Thomsen (born 1912). The second youngest of four children (three girls and one boy), she grew up in an old farmhouse in Tandslet where her parents had their practices. As a child, she was strongly influenced by her maternal grandmother, the author and politician Ingeborg Refslund Thomsen (1891–1972), spending much of her time at Brundlund Manor, her grandparents' home in Åbenrå. She dreamt of becoming a journalist, writing short stories and poems. After matriculating from highschool in Sønderborg, she spent half a year as an au pair in Cambridge, England, improving her command of English.

On her return to Denmark, she studied German and English at the University of Copenhagen. Participating in political student life, she met Karen Syberg with whom she set up Rødstrumperne, a small group based on American feminist movement Redstockings, which turned into the Danish Redstocking Movement. A demonstration in Copenhagen in 1970 ended with the women discarding their bras with a banner declaring Hold Danmark ren (Keep Denmark Clean). Further activities in support of women followed, including the creation of a "Women's Camp" on the island of Femø and calls for abortion rights in 1970. Vasbo abandoned her university studies in 1973, becoming a medical assistant in Bispebjerg Hospital.

Many of the members of the Redstocking Movement were either already lesbians or decided to adopt lesbian ways. Vasbo, who had undergone a short marriage, was among them. In the face of opposition to lesbianism by many of the Redstocking members, the Lesbian Movement (Lesbisk Bevægelse) was established in 1974, with a membership of 200 activists. Together with Norwegian activist, Gerd Brantenberg, who had become her partner, Vasbo moved to Oslo, working as a crane driver. On the basis of diary notes, she wrote Al den løgn on kvinders svaghed, published in Danish and Norwegian in 1976 and later in German, describing how a woman could take up a job traditionally reserved for men. It was the first Danish book which openly described a woman's experiences from a lesbian viewpoint.

Vasbo broke off her contacts with the Lesbian Movement in 1981 when she met Danish priest Leo Thomsen in Italy. She developed a difficult relationship with him, ending in a separation a month before his death in 1998. Their romance was described in Miraklet i Amalfi (The Miracle in Amalfi), bringing Vasbo attention. She went on to write a historic novel set in 7th-century England, Hildas sang (Hilda's Song, 1991), combining family life and sex. It was warmly welcome by the critics.

== Selected works ==
- 1976: Al den løgn om kvinders svaghed
- 1980: Efterårsferie ved fjorden, short stories
- 1980: Måske har jeg haft en anelse, poetry
- 1981: Sygehjælper i æbletræernes blomstringstid, short stories
- 1982: Den enøjede killing, short stories
- 1984: Miraklet i Amalfi, novel
- 1985: Anna-Amanda, short stories
- 1990: Det er det, jeg siger: Man vil begå mord!, short stories
- 1991: Hildas sang, historisk roman fra 600´årenes England, novel
- 1993: Glæden ved at kigge ud ad vinduet, essay
- 2004: Artemis, beretningen om en kat
- 2008: Der mangler en sang om solsorten, novel
- 2018: The Song of Hild, English translation of Hildas sang (translated by Gaye Kynoch)
