= Elsebeth Budolfsen =

Danish pharmacist and business executive

Elsebeth Budolfsen (born 8 March 1947) is a Danish pharmacist and business executive. She has held top management positions in several Danish companies over the past 20 years, including managing director of ALK-Abelló, Christian Hansen Holding and Novo. As of September 2015, she heads the biotechnology company T-cellic (a.k.a.Torsana Oncology Systems) while serving on the board of directors of over a dozen private companies and public organizations, including DONG Energy, Danske Bank and the Risø Research Centre.

== Biography ==
Budolfsen graduated in pharmacy from the Danish Pharmaceutical College in 1971 and went on to earn an M.Sc. in biology in 1973. She received the title of businesswoman of the year in 1997 and has been a member of the Danish Academy of Technical Sciences since 1991.

Budolsen has become a strong supporter of women in top management. In an interview with the Danish newspaper Berlingske, she explained: "Modern employees want a new kind of leadership. They no longer seek top-down orders on what they have to do. It is here women can offer a different kind of management. The new Y generation want a more holistic approach. And women can provide it."

Elsebeth Budolfsen is the daughter of the medical specialist Svend Erik Budolfsen and the physiotherapist Kirsten Elisabeth Larsen. She is the younger sister of the archaeologist and cultural historian Lise Hannestad (born 1943).
