= Alfhilda Mechlenburg =

Danish writer

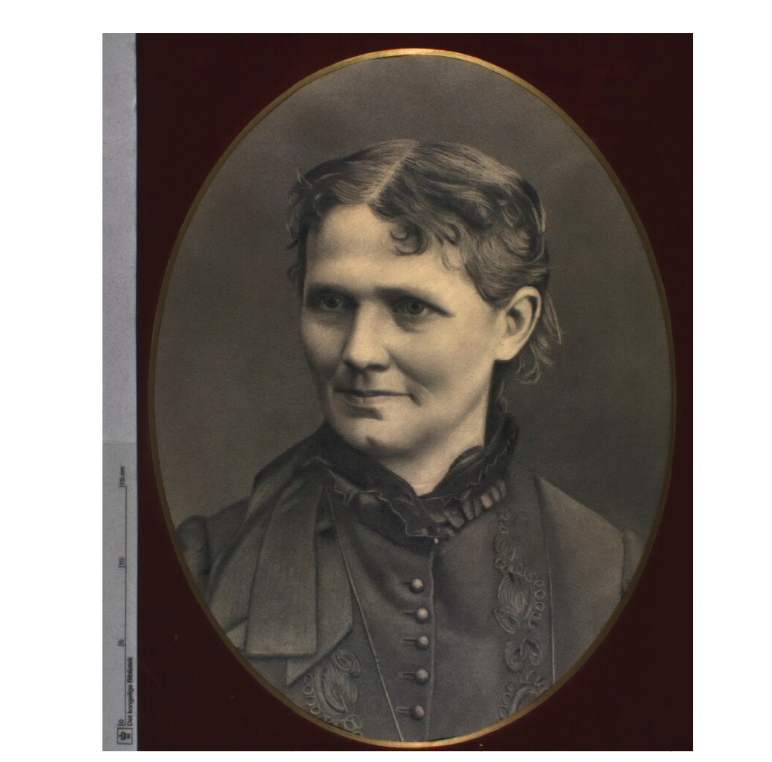
Alfhilda Mechlenburg

Alfhilda Theodora Adelheid Mechlenburg née Suenssen (1830–1907), pen name Ivan Ring, was a Danish novelist and short story writer. Brought up by a mother deeply interested in literature, like her younger sisters Fanny Suenssen and Teckla Juel she devoted her life to writing. After first contributing short stories to journals, she published her acclaimed To Fortællinger (Two Stories) in 1872. She went on to publish a series of novels and short stories until 1893, gaining wide popularity both in Denmark and Sweden.

== Biography ==
Born in Copenhagen on 10 February 1930, Alfhilda Theodora Adelheid Suenssen was the eldest daughter of Captain Johan Fedder Carsten Suenssen (1795–1840) and his wife Margaret née Juel. She was brought up by a mother deeply interested in literature with two younger sisters who also became writers. In 1864, she married Carl Adolph Rothe Mechlenburg, a Norwegian naval captain, who died in 1868.

Alhilda Suenssen spent her childhood in the south of Jutland where her father was a sea captain in Tønning. When he died in 1840, the family moved to Copenhagen where she grew up in a happy home. As the eldest daughter, she followed her mother's interest in patriotism and literature. When she was 16, she went to visit relatives in Norway but remained there for an extended period and married Captain Mechlenburg in 1864. Their only daughter died as an infant in 1867 and her husband passed away a year later. As a result, Alhilda Mechlenburg returned to Denmark to live with her mother.

In the 1870s, she contributed rather old-fashioned romantic short stories to various journals, including Illustreret Tid and Skandinavisk Folkemagasin. In 1878, she published To Fortællinger followed by Fortællinger in 1878. Gaining popularity, she went on to publish a series of novels and short stories, completing a total of ten works in the 1880s and early 1890s.

Alfhilda Mechlenburg died in Copenhagen on 10 August 1907.
