= Anne Margrethe Qvitzow =

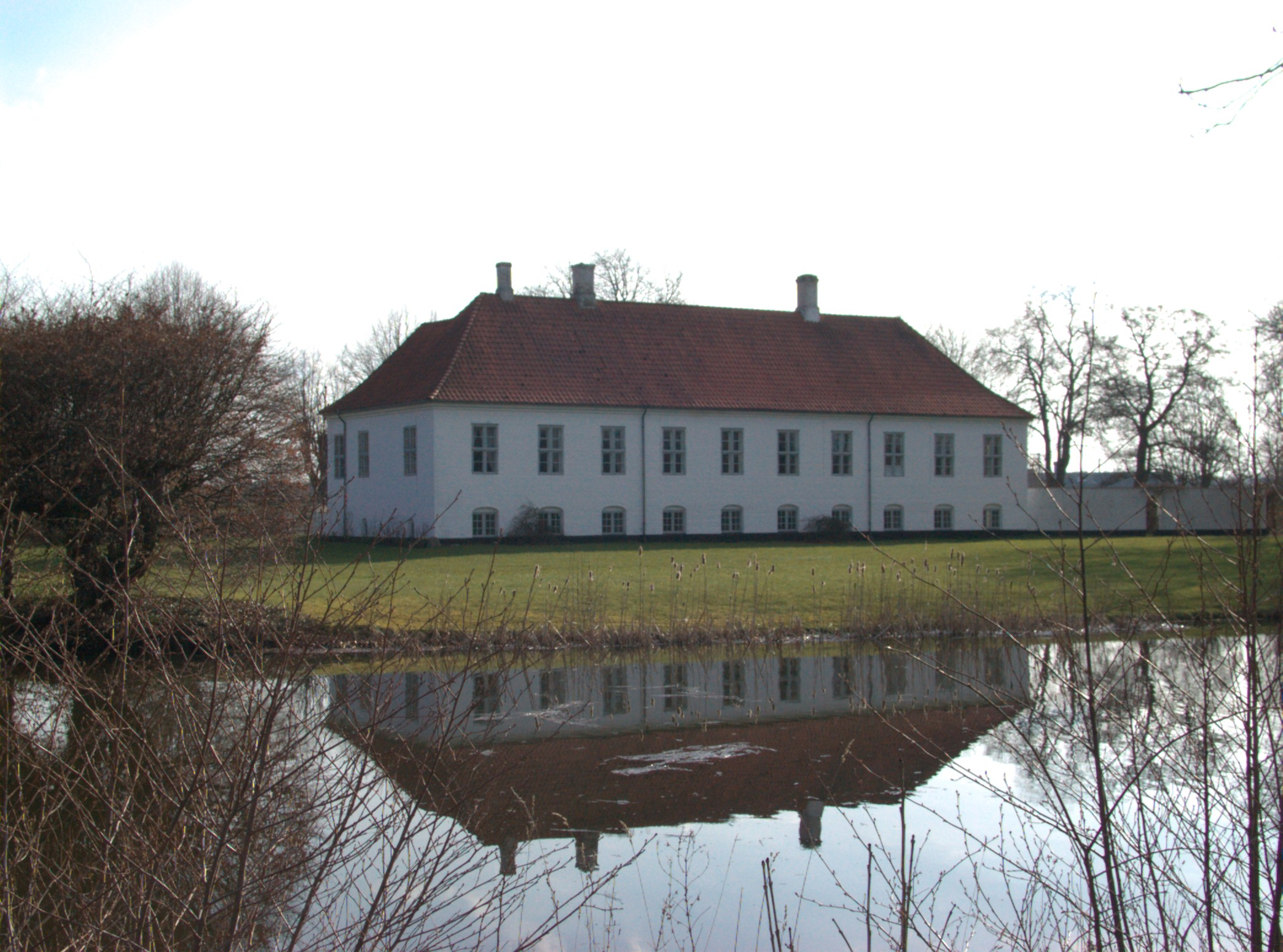
Sandagergård manor on northern Funen

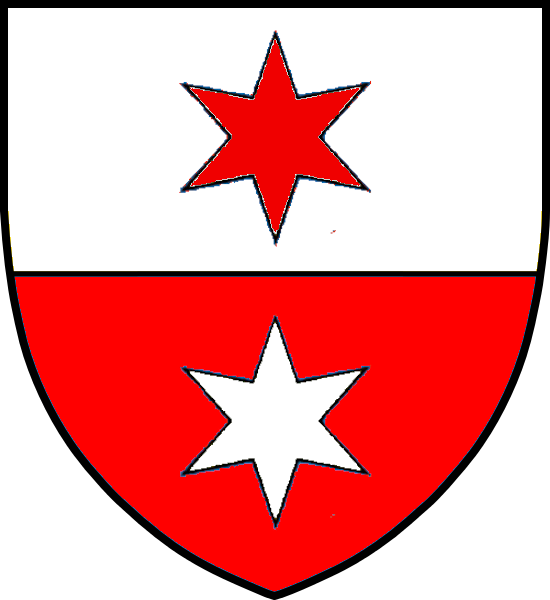
Qvitzow

Anne Margrethe Qvitzow (1652 - c. 1700) was a Danish poet and memoir writer. She is most associated with her translations.

== Biography ==
Qvitzow was born and raised at the family estate Sandagergård on the island of Funen, Denmark. She was the daughter of noble officer Erik Qvitzow (1616–78) and Susanne Juel (d. 1685). She was given an unusually high education: at this time, female members of the Danish nobility were normally barely taught to read and write. However, as showed herself to be very gifted early on, her parents hired private teachers to educate her in Danish, German, Latin, Greek, French, grammar, logic, rhetoric, geometry, astronomy, arithmetic, musical science, and also begun studies in Hebrew. In 1669, she translated Lasternis skrabe from German into Danish and Latin. She translated De Officiis by Cicero and Commentarii de Bello Gallico by Julius Caesar) from Latin into Danish in circa 1670.

During the 1670s and 1680s, she was a celebrity. In 1673, Qvitzow rejected the idea that her learning should be considered in any way remarkable because of her sex, and stated that if women were given the same education as men, they would prove themselves to be just as capable. Bishop Erik Pontoppidan (1698–1764) later called her “Heroina longe eruditissima” and compared her to Dutch artist and poet Anna Maria van Schurman (1607–1678).

In 1676, Qvitzow married noble Christian von Pappenheim (d. 1705). Reportedly, her spouse wasted their fortune. In 1685, she wrote elegy to Ove Rosenkrantz Axelsen til Raakilde, a poem dedicated the memory of Ove Rosenkrantz Axelsen. Her writing is no longer heard of after that date. Her late life is not much known and her exact dated of death is unknown.

Qvitzow was included in contemporary dictionaries and work of female scholars and learned women, (gynæcée) by Matthias Henriksen Schacht (1660-1700), Albert Lauritsen Thura (1700–1740) and Fr. Chr. Schønau.

== See also ==
- Anne Margrethe Bredal
- Birgitte Thott

== Sources ==
- Elisabeth Møller Jensen (red.): Nordisk kvindelitteraturhistorie, 1993-98.
- Hans Jørgen Birch: Billedgalleri for Fruentimmer, 1793.
- Fr. Chr. Schønau: Samling af danske lærde Fruentimer, 1753.
- Dansk Biografisk Leksikon.
