= List of Faroese women writers =

This is a list of women writers who were born in the Faroe Islands or whose writings are closely associated with that country.

== D ==
- Marianna Debes Dahl (born 1947), novelist, short story writer, children's writer, playwright, translator

== G ==
- Sigri Mitra Gaïni (born 1975), Norwegian-born Faroese poet, actress, teacher

== H ==
- Bergtóra Hanusardóttir (born 1946), novelist, short story writer, playwright, poet, women's rights activist, magazine editor
- Guðrið Helmsdal (born 1941), poet, non-fiction writer, also writes in Danish, Norwegian and Icelandic
- Rakel Helmsdal (born 1966), Danish-born Faroese children's writer, short story writer, playwright
- Ebba Hentze (1930–2015), children's writer, poet, translator

== J ==
- Oddvør Johansen (born 1941), novelist, short story writer, children's writer

== K ==
- Sissal Kampmann (born 1974), poet
- Marjun Syderbø Kjelnæs (born 1974), short story writer, children's writer

== M ==
- Sólrún Michelsen (born 1948), children's writer

== O ==
- Katrin Ottarsdóttir (born 1957), poet, film director

== P ==
- Helena Patursson (1864–1916), actress, feminist, essayist, columnist

== S ==
- Turið Sigurðardóttir (born 1946), educator, non-fiction writer, translator
- Sigrið av Skarði Joensen (1908–1975), journalist, teacher, feminist

== See also ==
- List of Faroese people
- List of Danish women writers
- List of Danish writers
- List of women writers
