= Bodil Bech =

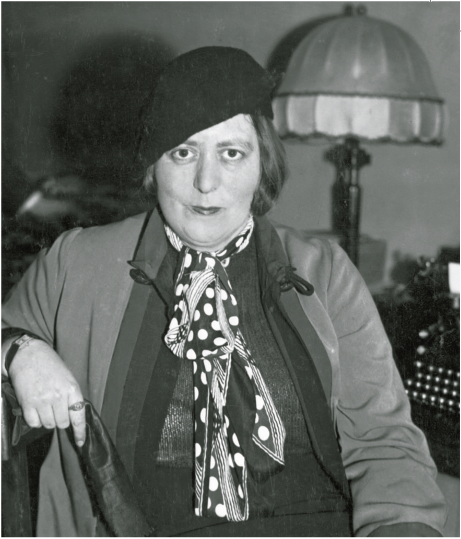
Bodil Bech

Bodil Adele Vilhelmine Bech (1889–1942) was a Danish writer who is remembered principally for her poetry. It was not until 1934 that she published her first book, the poetry collection Vi der ejer natten (We who own the night). She associated with the surrealist writers and artists who contributed to the literary journals Konkretion and Linien. Bech went on to publish further works of poetry as well as the novel Lones Balkanfærd (Lone's Balkan Trip), for which she used the pen name Anna Fole. Her poetry broke the conventions of the time, expressing unfulfilled desire and missed conjugal happiness in terms of the painful cosmic mystery of sexuality.

== Early life, education and family ==
Born on 13 March 1889 in Nørre Broby on the island of Funen, Bodil Adele Vilhelmine Bech was the daughter of the estate owner Hans Bech (1861–1922) and his wife Juliane Filippa Camilla née Jensen (1863–1923). She was brought up in a well-to-do home in central Funen. After a year at the Danish business school, she moved to New York where she spent five years studying piano at the New York College of Music. Bech was married twice, first in 1910 with the civil engineer Holger Lauritz Petersen Varder (1877–1910). The marriage was dissolved in 1917. Then in April 1917, she married the art historian Poul Uttenreitter (1886–1956). The marriage was dissolved in 1921.

== Career ==
As a result of her second marriage with Poul Uttenreitter, who was not only politically active but was behind the pioneering art journal Klingen, she came into contact the writers and artists of the day. She was also influenced by her later relationship with the poet Jens August Schade.

In 1926, she made her debut in the journal Tidens Kvinder and went on to contribute to Vild Hvede, Linien, Kulturhamoen and Aarstiderne. She also translated a few books including some by the Austrian writer Arthur Schnitzler. In 1934, she published her first collection of poetry, Vi der ejer Natter. Written in free verse and without punctuation, her poems are freer that those of Hulda Lütken and reflect the influence of Edith Södergran. Using the pen name Anna Fole, in 1942 she published Lones Balkanfærd, a novel for young people. Her poetry was inspired by her travels to Lapland and by her visits to Edith Såodergran¨s home in Raivola on the Karelian peninsula.

Other works of late-Romantic poetry included Ildtunger danser (1935), Granit og Dugg (1938), Flyvende Hestemanker (1940) and Ud af Himmelporte (1941).

Bodil Bech died on 3 September 1942 in Gudhjem on the island of Bornholm.
