= Johanne Bille =

Danish writer

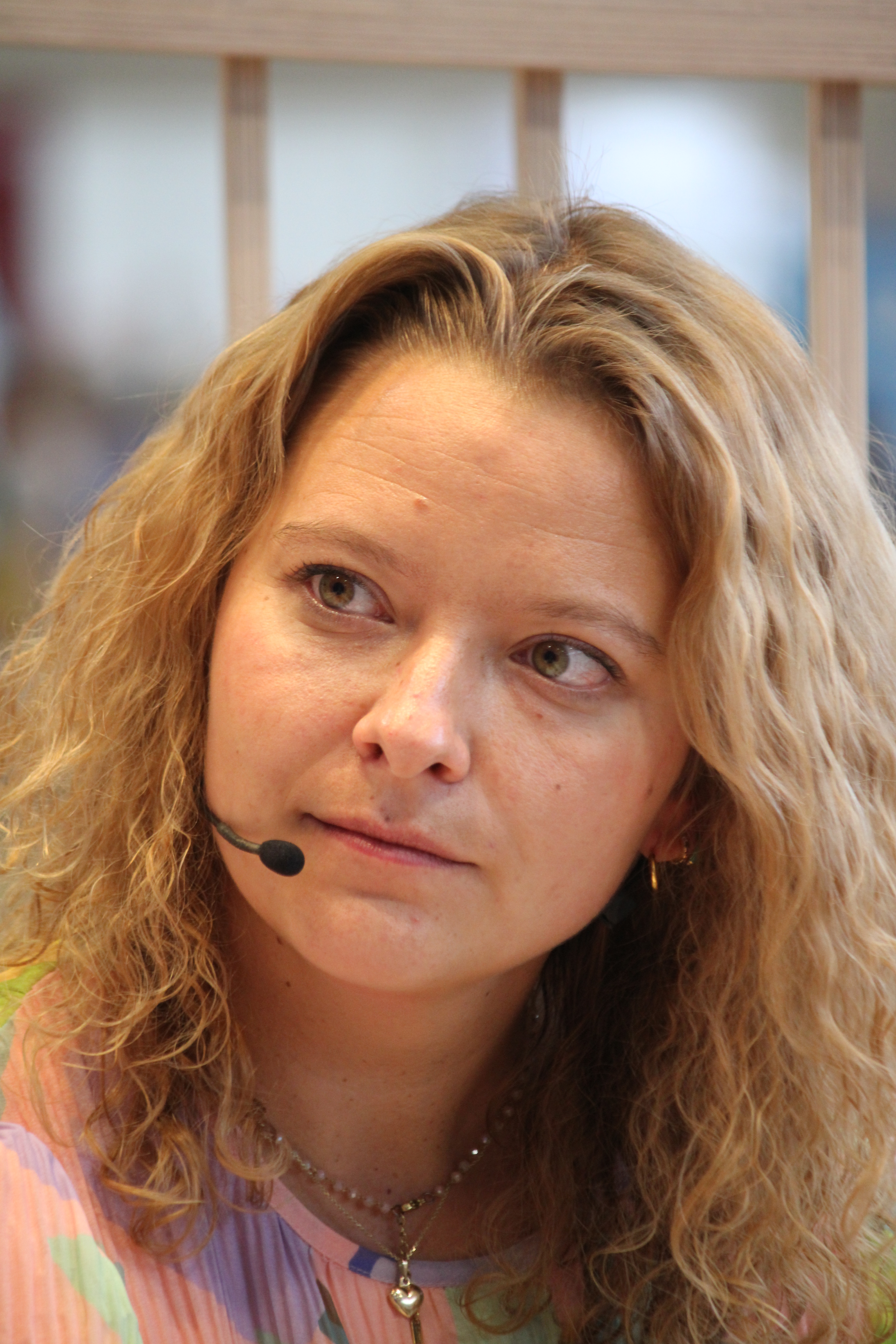
Bille in 2025

Johanne Bille (born 1993) is a Danish novelist who made her debut in 2015 with Tænk nu hvis (Just think if), about a young woman suffering from the loss of her father. The same year she published Elastik which appeared in English as Elastic in 2019. More recently, she has published Når mænd forlader mig (When men leave me, 2022) about a writer trying to find her own voice and Et liv med dig (A life with you, 2023).

== Early life ==
Born in 1993 in the Frederiksberg district of Copenhagen, Johanne Bille was introduced to writing at an early age by her father who was a journalist. She was also influenced by his connections with the world of music. She studied political science at university but terminated her studies after her bachelor's degree in order to concentrate on writing.

== Career ==
Bille made her debut as a writer in 2015 with her novel Tænk nu hvis (Just think if) based on the grief a young girl experiences following the death of her father. The same year she published Elastik (translated into English as Elastic) about a self-centered woman who does not want to adapt to society but experiences confusion after falling in love. This is typical of her novels about well behaved, rather unlikable women who have difficulty with both their gender and their place in society. This was also true of the protagonist in Når mænd forlader mig (When men leave me) published in 2022.

In 2020, together with Sidsel Andersen, Bille established Harpyie, a micro-publisher designed to promote fiction liable to influence discussion of society. However, in 2023, it was announced that Harpyie would close.

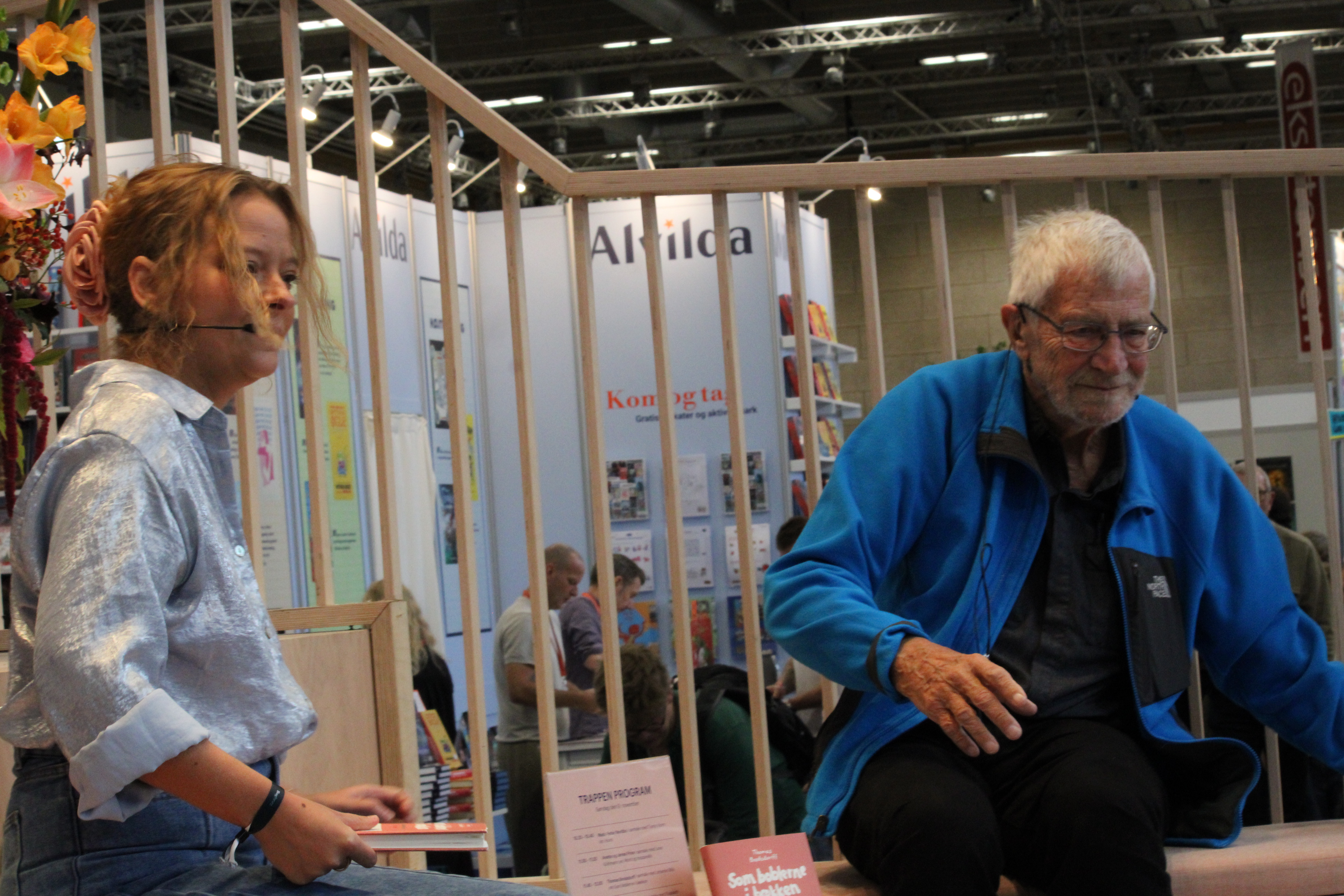
Bille interviewing Thomas Bredsdorff at Bogforum 2025

In 2024, Bille published the first book in her romance series Boghandel Blåregn (The Wisteria Bookshop), a Danish-language series that follows a group of friends in their search for love and their path through life. The series takes its name from a fictional bookshop, Blåregn, around which the novels revolve. The shop, founded by the character Mille together with her friends in Ahornstræde, Copenhagen, serves as the central setting for the stories. The novels explore the challenges and joys the women encounter both in everyday life and at festive occasions. The first book, Sommer i Boghandel Blåregn (Summer in the Wisteria Bookshop), appeared in 2024, followed the same year by Et øjeblik i december (A Moment in December). In 2025, Bille continued the series with Masker af kærlighed (Masks of Love) and Mens haven springer ud (When the Garden Blooms).
