= Sophie Petersen =

Danish geographer (1885–1965)

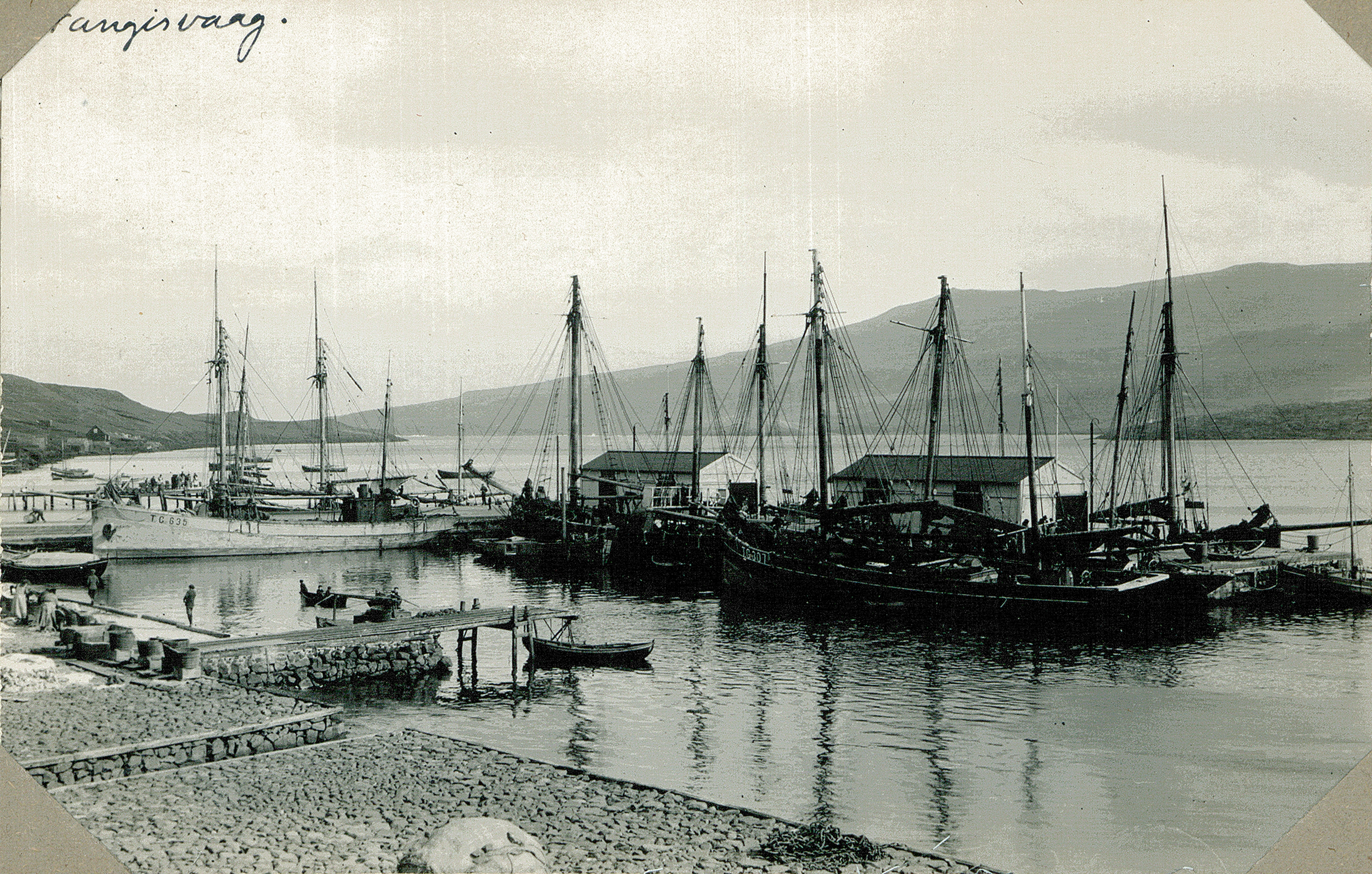
Fishing boats in the Faroes from Sophie Petersen's album (c. 1930)

Sophie Clausine Petersen (1885–1965) was a Danish geographer, geologist, educator, photographer and writer. While she contributed much to teaching methods at the gymnasium (i.e. high school) level, especially in connection with requirements for girls, she is remembered for writing about her travels to the four corners of the earth. Her publications were widely read, above all Danmarks gamle Tropekolonier (Denmark's Old Tropical Colonies, 1946) which sold out after a month. In addition to her employment at Nørre Gymnasium (1920–1955), she lectured widely and was an active member of many associations including the Danish Geological Society.

== Early life ==
Born in Copenhagen on 15 February 1885, Sophie Clausine Petersen was the daughter of the businessman Lars Petersen (1844–1904) and his wife Jacobine Wilhelmine Dyveke née Fiebig (1848–1907). Brought up in a well-to-do family, she attended N. Zahle's School where she matriculated with excellent marks in 1905. She went on to study natural history and geology at the University of Copenhagen, earning a master's degree in 1911.

== Career ==
After qualifying for a teaching diploma, Petersen first taught in various private girls schools until she was appointed to a post of lector in Nørre Gymnasium in 1920 where she continued to teach until 1955. Interested in improving teaching conditions for girls, she made various proposals including one that suggested that girls should be able to opt out of mathematics in favour of more time spend on learning housekeeping. She was also keen to keep girls schools separate from mixed schools as she believed girls matured more quickly.

Outside professional circles, Petersen was known as a world traveller, perhaps even the most travelled woman in the world. From 1914, she travelled alone every summer to a new destination, publishing articles and books about her experiences. In 1935, for example, she flew by airship from Germany to Brazil. Other trips included Greenland, the Faroe Islands, Iceland, Burma, Australia, Ethiopia, Mexico, Guatemala, South America and Nigeria.

Sophie Petersen died in Bagsværd on 11 October 1965.
