= Marianne Nøhr Larsen =

Danish anthropologist

Marianne Nøhr Larsen (born 1963) is a Danish anthropologist and writer who since 2002 has run the networking facility "Center for Interkulturel dialog" (Centre for Intercultural Dialogue) in Copenhagen.

== Biography ==
Born on 26 March 1963, after matriculating from Helsingør Gymnasium, Nøhr Larsen studied anthropology at the University of Copenhagen graduating in 1995. Since 2002, she has headed the Copenhagen networking consultancy "Center for Interkulturel Dialog" where she has arranged courses and workshops on intercultural dialogue. In particular, she has helped Greenlanders and Muslims adapt to life in Denmark. In regard to Muslim women, she has worked on problems associated with arranged marriages and wearing headscarves. She has spoken out against the efforts of the Danish authorities to force the Danish way of life on ethnic minorities: "The more you force them to act in a given way, the more they'll fight against it." Nøhr Larsen has also written about the difficulty experienced by homosexuals belonging to ethnic minorities.

== Selected publications ==
Nøhr Larsen has published a considerable number of books and papers including:

- Fenger-Grøndahl, Malene; Nøhr Larsen, Marianne (2007). Den forbandede kærlighed: 14 fortaellinger om homoseksuelle og kulturel mangfoldighed. CDR. ISBN 978-87-7841-443-4.
- Nøhr Larsen, Marianne (2004). De små oprør. Saxo. ISBN 978-87-79341-371.
- Nøhr Larsen, Marianne (2000). Elsker - elsker ikke: om kærlighed og arrangerede ægteskaber. CDR. ISBN 87-7841-208-0.
- Nøhr Larsen, Marianne (1999). To ristede med pita. CDR. ISBN 978-87-78411-440.
