= Fanny Suenssen =

Danish writer

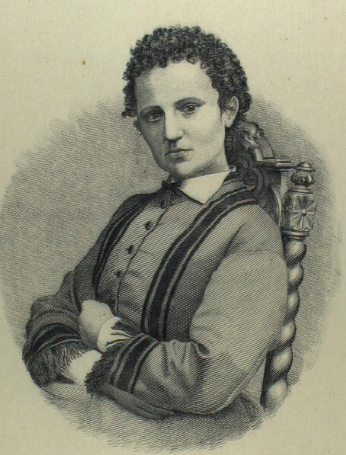
Fanny Suenssen

Fanny Margrethe Kirstine Suenssen (1832–1918) was a Danish writer. Brought up by a mother interested in literature, like her sisters Alfhilda Mechlenburg and Teckla Juel, she contributed articles to women's magazines and published novels and short stories. Although she suffered from poor health throughout her life and was often bed-ridden, she nevertheless completed her first novel Amalie Vardum in 1862. She published anonymously until the 1890s when she put her name to two collections of short stories.

== Biography ==
Born in Tønning in southern Jutland on 14 October 1832, Fanny Margrethe Kirstine Suenssen was the second daughter of Captain Johan Fedder Carsten Suenssen (1795–1840) and his wife Margaret née Juel. She was brought up by a mother deeply interested in literature with two sisters who also became writers.

Fanny Suenssen spent her childhood in the south of Jutland where her father was a sea captain in Tønning. When he died in 1840, the family moved to Copenhagen where she grew up in a happy home. Suffering from poor health, she remained there for the rest of her life but thanks to her bright outlook and her deep religious faith she overcame the effects of her illness. In 1862, she published her first novel Amalie Vardum which depicts a girl's childhood and early youth, reflecting some of her own experiences. It was well received. It was followed by Juleaften (Christmas Eve) in 1864, Tekla Eichel (1864) and Aldrig (Never) in 1871, all published anonymously. From 1862, she also published a series of short stories in magazines and newspapers. The first of these was En gammel Piges Historie (An Old Girl's Story) which was published in episodes in Berlingske Tidende. She also contributed stories to Skandinavisk Folkemagazin from 1870.

In 1872, Suenssen also wrote the play En Skilsmisse (A Divorce) which was first performed in Norway and later at the Royal Danish Theatre in Copenhagen as Et Ægteskab i Fare (A Marriage in Danger). Her children's book Ei blot til Lyst was published in 1880. In the 1870s, she contributed a number of articles to Berlingske Tidende on women's issues under the heading "I Tusmørke" (In the Twilight). She also used the title Tusmørke for her first collection of short stories in 1890, followed by a second collection Han er Jøde (He's a Jew) in 1892. Several of her works were also published in Swedish and German, some even in Hungarian.

Fanny Suenssen died in the Frederiksberg district of Copenhagen on 29 March 1918 and was buried in Holmen Cemetery.
