= Voldborg Ølsgaard =

Danish peace activist (1877–1939)

Voldborg Antoinette Brøns Ølsgaard née Appelt (1877–1939) was a Danish peace activist who was also active in the Aarhus branch of the Danish Women's Society. A member of the peace movement Danske Kvinders Fredskæde, she headed its third Jutland district (1922–25) and edited the organization's paper Fred og Frihed ('Peace and Freedom') until 1937. Ølsgaard was behind the construction of Dansk Kvindesamfunds Hus (Danish Women's Society House), completed in 1930. She was responsible for its management until her retirement as a result of illness in 1935.

== Early life and family ==
Born in Ommestrup, Djursland, on 13 October 1877, Voldborg Antoinette Brøns Appelt was the daughter of the high school principal Marius Nicolaj Appelt (1841–1907) and his wife Petra Jakobine Louise née Brøns (1847–1926). She was educated at her father's Mørke Højskole. In November 1901, she married the sculptor Elias Ølsgaard (1983–1964).

== Career ==
Devoted to the cause of peace, the couple built a home they called "Pax" in Aarhus where Elias had received a commission to decorate the State Library. Voldborg Ølsgaard was an early member of Danske Kvinders Fredskæde which was founded after the 1915 Women's Peace Conference in the Hague. In 1925, the Danish organization changed its name to Kvindernes Internationale Liga for Fred og Frihed in line with the name of the international organization Women's International League for Peace and Freedom.

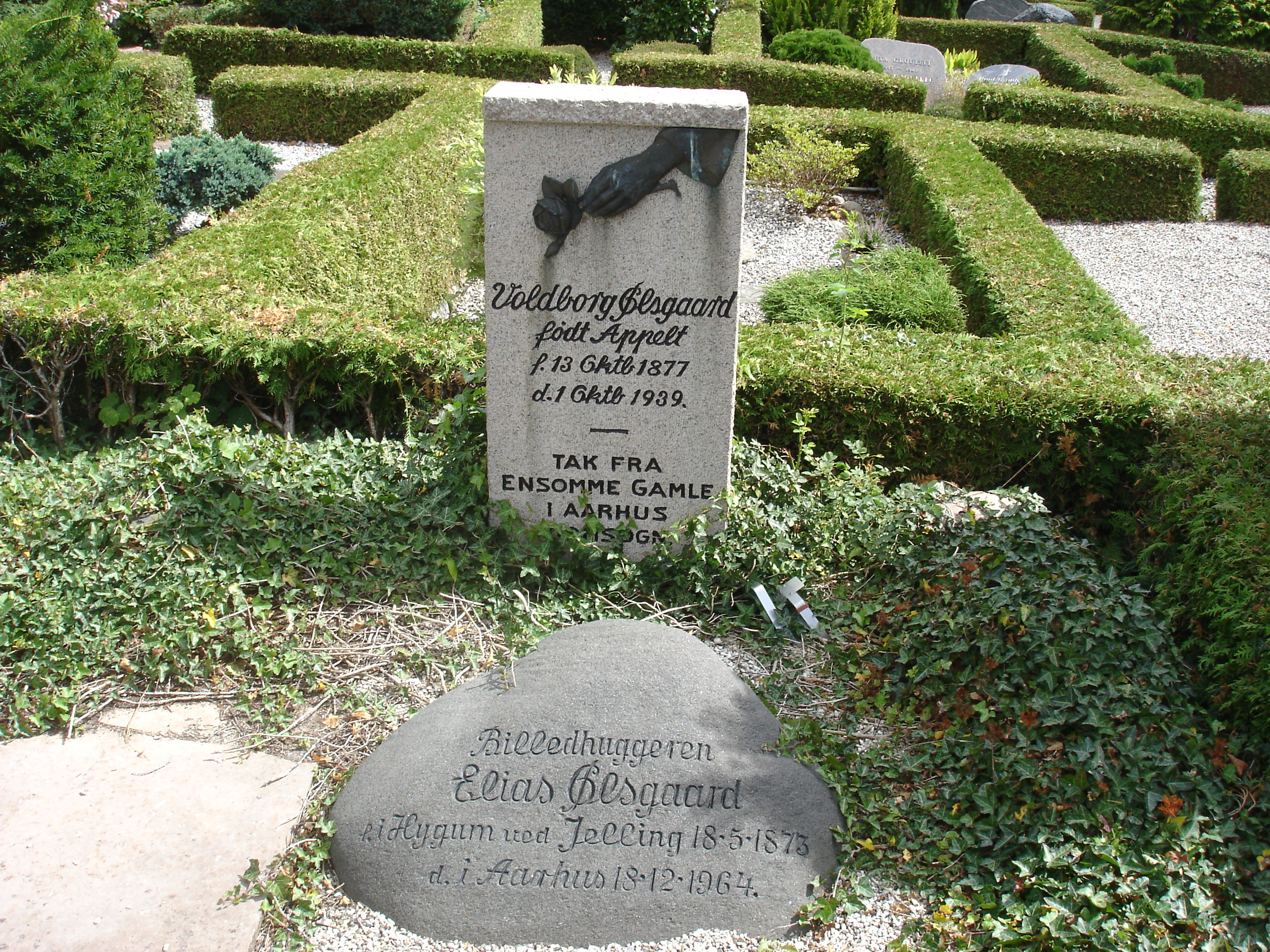
Voldborg Ølsgaard's gravestone in Mørke

Ølsgaard headed the peace movement's third Jutland district from 1922 to 1029, lecturing, promoting activities and attracting affiliations in a number of towns in the area. In particular, she edited the organization's paper Fred og Frihed from its beginnings as a four-page sheet in 1924 to its expanded version with 4,000 subscribers, retiring due to poor health at the end of 1937.

She was also active in the women's movement and served on the board of the organization's Aarhus branch. She was particularly successful in arranging for the construction of a building to house the organization's Aarhus activities. Known as the Dansk Kvindesamfunds Hus, it was completed in 1930 and she continued to manage it until she had to retire for health reasons in 1935.

Voldborg Antoinette Brøns Ølsgaard died in Aarhus on 1 October 1939 and was buried in the churchyard at Mørke. Her husband designed her gravestone.

== See also ==
- Women in Denmark
