= Thyra Jensen =

Thyra Margrethe Marie Kirstine Jensen (1865–1949) was a Danish writer and women's rights activist.

In addition to her children's stories, which often drew on her own childhood, she wrote for adults, producing a number of short biographies. She was active in Southern Jutland's Women Association, supporting the Danish-speaking minority in Schleswig. Her most successful book was probably Constance Leth. Grundtvigs Ungdomskærlighed (Constance Leth. Grundtvig's Young Romance (1922), republished in an enlarged edition in 1941 as Fruen på Egeløkke.

From 1935, Jensen chaired South Schleswig's Women's Association (Den Sydslesvigske Kvindeforening), introducing the Slesvigske Kvinders Julebog (Schleswig Women's Christmas Book) which she published from 1936.
