= Hanne Finsen =

Danish art historian and museum director (1925–2023)

Hanne Finsen (8 March 1925 – 14 September 2023) was a Danish art historian and museum director who had a special interest in French art. While at the National Gallery of Denmark, in 1970 she arranged the internationally acclaimed Henri Matisse retrospective. In 1978, she was appointed director of both the Hirschsprung Collection and the Ordrupgaard Collection. At Ordrupgaard, she presented a number of exhibitions, including those on Vilhelm Hammershoi and Édouard Manet. In 2005, in collaboration with the Musée du Luxembourg, Finsen presented "Matisse – A Second Life" at the Louisiana Museum of Modern Art, an exhibition focusing on the painter's later works.

== Biography ==
Born on 8 March 1925 in Copenhagen, Hanne Finsen was the daughter of the physician Valgard Finsen (1896–1980) and the sculptor Inge Ebstrup (1899–1977). Brought up in a well-to-do cultural environment, after graduating from Øregård Gymnasium in 1943, she studied history of art at the University of Copenhagen. While still a student, she helped arrange a number of exhibitions on French art at Ny Carlsberg Glyptotek and Charlotenborg. In 1957, she married the theatre director Knud Poulsen (1920–2003).

On earning a master's degree with a focus on the French Impressionist Pierre-Auguste Renoir, in 1953 she was appointed scientific assistant on painting and sculpture collections at the National Gallery of Denmark. She created a catalogue of the museum's international collection of modern art, including Johannes Rump's collection which included works by Matisse. In 1958 she became a curator and in 1965 the principal curator for the museum's copper plate engravings. After a study trip the United States in 1960, she became increasingly interested in activities aimed at fostering interest in art collections. In 1967, she arranged an exhibition of engravings titled "Hommage à l'art français" and from 1969 to 1971 she headed work on a retrospective of Henri Matisse which was held in 1970 to wide acclaim.

In 1978, Helsted was appointed director of both the Hirschsprung and the Ordrupsgård collections. Thanks to her enthusiasm, she drew attention to these two museums which had been rather quiet in earlier years. She arranged exhibitions of Wifredo Lam and Eva Sørensen at the Hirschsprung in 1978 followed by "Skagen i København" (Skagen in Copenhagen) in 1979, attracting a considerable number of visitors. Equally successful were her exhibitions at Ordrupgård which included "Vilhelm Hammershoi" (1981), "Gauguin og van Gogh i København" (1893) and "Kapellet i Vence" (1993), presenting works by Matisse. She remained director at Ordrupsgård until 1995.

In 2005, in collaboration with the Musée du Luxembourg, Finsen presented "Matisse – A Second Life" at the Louisiana Museum of Modern Art, an exhibition focusing on the painter's later works. Presenting some 150 paintings in the 15 years following Matisse's operation in 1941, the exhibition was inspired by Finsen's interest in the correspondence between Matisse and André Rouveyre (1879–1962).

Finsen died on 14 September 2023, at the age of 98.
