= Anne Margrethe Bredal =

Danish scholar and feminist writer

- Born: 1655
- Died: 1729 (aged 73–74)
- Known for: Scholar and writer

Anne Margrethe Bredal (1655–1729), was a Danish scholar and feminist writer.

== Biography ==
She was the daughter of the vicar Jens Pedersen Bredal, a vicar, and Marie Holgersdatter. She was a gifted child, writing a Latin speech upon the anointment of Christian V of Denmark, which was printed in 1671.

Bredal was active as a governess in 1675–1677. She married Niels Sørensen in 1677. Together, they had eight children, one boy and seven girls. During her first arranged marriage, she was forced to spend all her time to the household and family economy because of the health of her spouse. After Sørensen's death around 1694, she returned to her studies during her mourning period. In 1697, she married principal Erik Bredal (d 1735).

Bredal spoke in favor of education for women and claimed that all women would be able to raise above their present intellect if they were but given education, and presented Anna Maria van Schurman and Birgitte Thott as role models.

Bredal was mentioned in contemporary dictionaries of female scholars by among others Albert Thura and Frederik Christian Schønau. Two of Bredal's letters written in Latin have been preserved at the Royal Library in Denmark. The second, written in 1703, was autobiographical.
