= Lotte Salling =

Danish writer

- Born: February 9, 1964 (age 62); Århus, Denmark
- Occupations: Short story writer, Poet
- Writing career
- Genre: Children's literature

Lotte Salling is a Danish writer born on February 9, 1964, in Århus, Denmark. She writes short stories for young children.

== Bibliography ==
- Trolderim
- Mit stamtræ
- Hvad brugte vi ilden til ?
- Gud, Thor og oldemor - og de andre oppe i himlen
- Peter Puslespil
- Sørøver Søren og andre alfabetrim
- Tyve Trætte Trolde
- En Hest i Rom
- Grummerim
- Slotsmusene
- Skøre Line
- Bager Basse og andre børnerim
- Fies Far
- 1. b
- 1. b i byen
- Vilfred og verdens værste vikinger
- Aktive eventyr
