= Bodil Jerslev Lund =

Danish chemist and educator (1919–2005)

Bodil Jerslev Lund (1919–2005) was a Danish chemist and educator. After graduating as a pharmacist from the Danish Pharmaceutical College in 1941, she continued her studies in Sweden, England and the United States. She earned a Ph.D. from the University of Copenhagen in 1958 with a thesis on X-ray crystallography as a basis for determining the structure of oximes. She then became a professor at Copenhagen University's Pharmaceutical College where she remained until 1989. She published several textbooks including two for high schools on organic chemistry. From 1981, she was a member of the Royal Swedish Academy of Sciences.

== Early life, education and family ==
Born on 30 April 1919 in Fjerritslev in the north of Jutland, Bodil Jerslev was the daughter of the pharmacist Aage Holger Christian Jens Johan Jerslev (1884–1943) and his wife Ella née Friis-Sørensen (1892–1958). After receiving her school leaving certificate from Aalborg Cathedral School in 1936, she earned a master's degree from the Danish Pharmaceutical College in 1941. During the German occupation of Denmark, she attended lectures on X-ray crystallography which became her main area of interest. Thanks to a grant, she spent a year at the University of Uppsala in Sweden studying X-ray crystallography.

In December 1948, she married the civil engineer Frederik Christian Freuchen Oxenbøll Lund (1921–1972), with whom she had two children: Ulla (1950) and Lise (1954).

== Career ==
After leaving school, Jerslev first assisted her father by working in his pharmacy. On graduating, she spent half a year working in Rigshospitalet's pharmacy. In 1942, she was engaged as a scientific assistant in the organic chemistry laboratory at the Pharmaceutical College. After the war, in 1948 she spent a period at Oxford University carrying our research on X-ray crystallography under Dorothy Hodgkin. Later in the year, she moved to Princeton, New Jersey, where she worked as a researcher at Princeton University under Hugh S. Taylor. While in the United States, she married Christian Lund.

On returning to Denmark, in 1951 she became a junior lecturer at the Pharmaceutical College and in 1958 she was appointed professor of organic chemistry, heading the department until her retirement in 1989. In parallel, she carried out research on the structure of organic compounds with the assistance of X-ray crystallography. As a result of her research, the college was able to acquire modern X-ray equipment.

Bodil Jerslev Lund died in Hellerup on 21 December 2005, aged 86.

== Honours and awards ==
Lund was admitted to the Royal Danish Academy of Sciences and Letters in 1971 and to the Royal Swedish Academy of Sciences in 1981. In 1982, she received the Danish Pharmaceutical College's gold medal. She was honoured as a Knight of the Order of the Dannebrog in 1965 and was promoted to Knight of the First Order in 1975.
