= Tönning =

Tönning Tønning / Taning
- Town
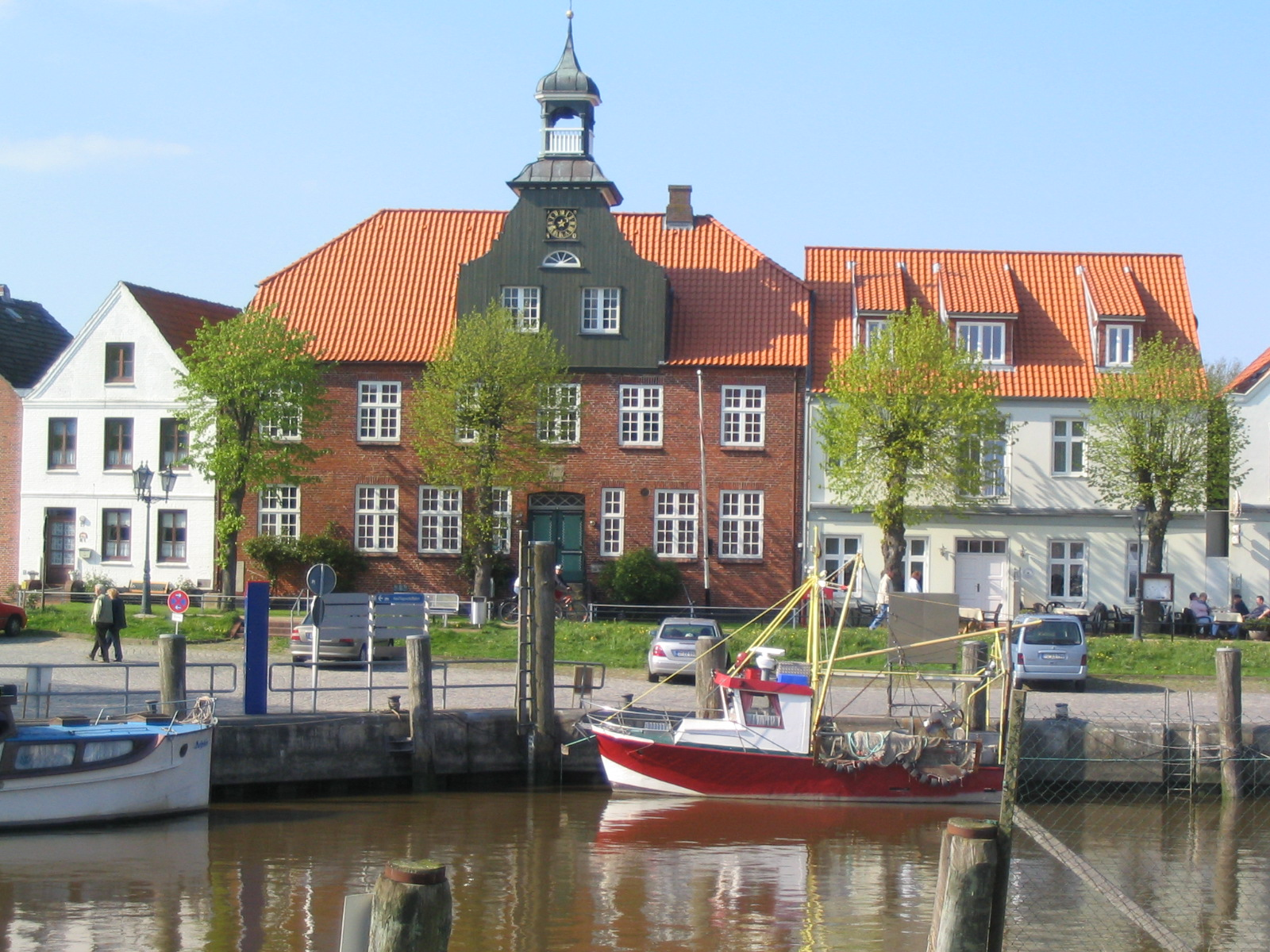
- Skippers house

- Coat of arms

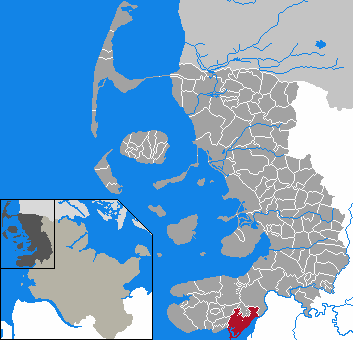
- Location of Tönning; Tønning / Taning within Nordfriesland district
- Interactive map of Tönning; Tønning / Taning
- Location within Germany Location within Schleswig-Holstein
- Coordinates: 54°19′2″N 8°56′34″E
- Country: Germany
- State: Schleswig-Holstein
- District: Nordfriesland

Government
  - Mayor: Dorothe Klömmer

Area
  - Total: 44.43 km^{2} (17.15 sq mi)
- Elevation: 0 m (0 ft)

Population (2025-12-31)
  - Total: 4,775
  - Density: 107.5/km^{2} (278.4/sq mi)
- Time zone: UTC+01:00 (CET)
  - Summer (DST): UTC+02:00 (CEST)
- Postal codes: 25832
- Dialling codes: 04861
- Vehicle registration: NF
- Website: www.toenning.de

Tönning (German pronunciation: [ˈtœnɪŋ]; Low German: Tünn, Tönn or Tönnen; Danish: Tønning; North Frisian: Taning) is a town in the district of Nordfriesland in the German state of Schleswig-Holstein.

== History ==
Tönning was destroyed in the Burchardi flood in 1634. During the Great Northern War, (1700–1721), Tönning was besieged twice.

== Geography ==
It is located on the northern bank of the Eider river, approximately eight kilometers away from its mouth at the North Sea. Tönning has a population of some 5,000 people.

== Transport ==
Tönning is connected by a regional train with Sankt Peter-Ording to the West, and Husum to the North-East. Tönning is also served by several bus routes.

== See also ==
- Eiderstedt peninsula
- Eider Barrage

== Notable people ==
=== Honorary citizens ===
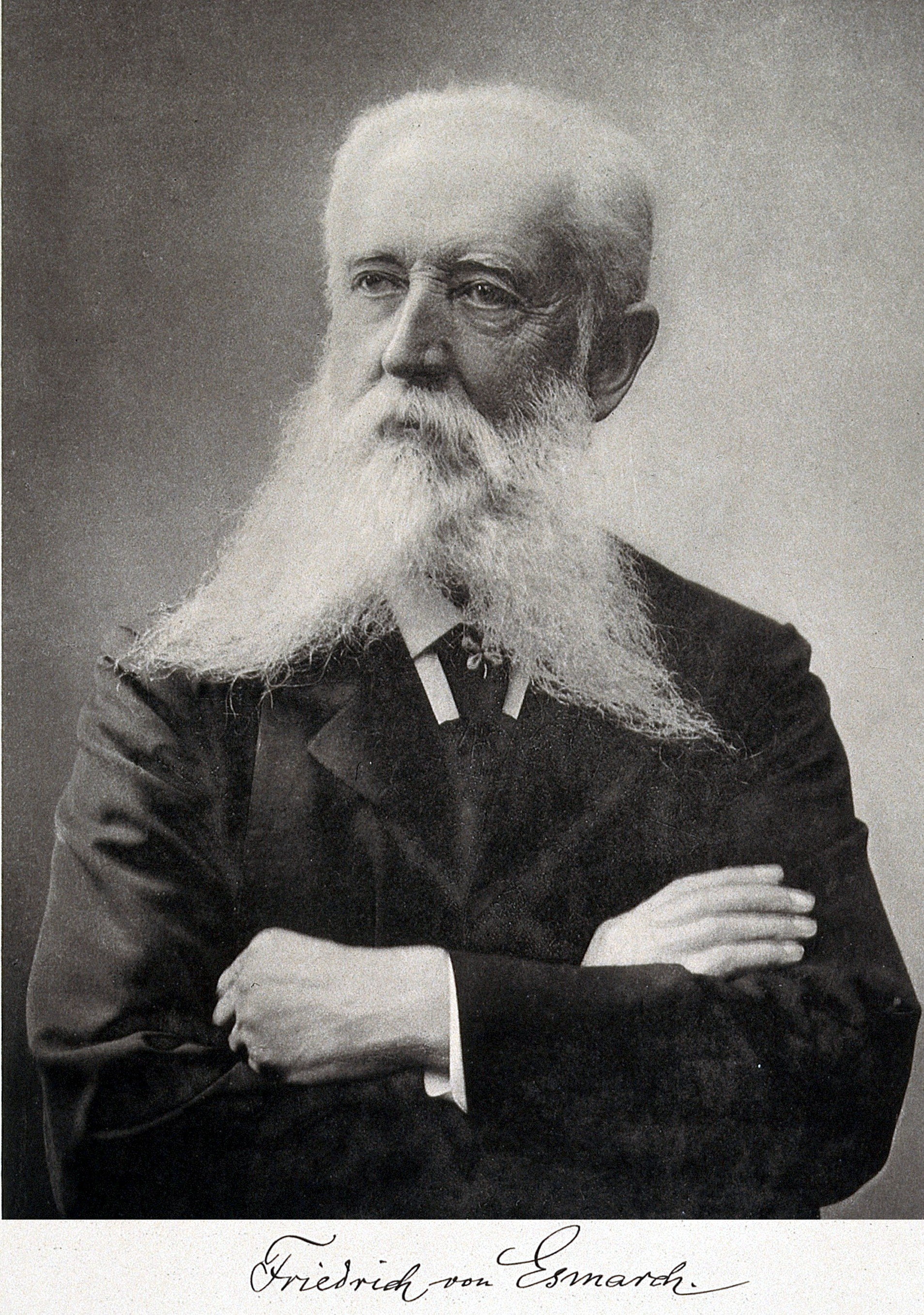
Friedrich von Esmarch

- Friedrich Wilhelm Selck (1821–1911), councilor of commerce, honorary citizen since 1899
- Friedrich von Esmarch (1823–1908), German physician and the founder of the civilian Samaritan system in Germany, honorary citizen since 1897; there is a memorial statue dedicated to him in the castle park.

=== Sons and daughters of the city ===
- Jürgen Ovens (1623–1678), painter, portraitist
- Johann Friedrich Alberti (1642–1710), composer, organist
- Fanny Suenssen (1832–1918), Danish novelist and short story writer
- Teckla Juel (1834–1904), Danish writer and composer.
- Kurt Thomas (1904–1973), composer, music educator and chorus leader

=== Connected to Tönning ===
- Hinrich Braren (1751–1826), captain, pilot and navigation instructor, died in Tönning. He wrote the first German-language textbook of shipping.
