= Teckla Juel =

Danish writer and song composer

- Teckla Violanta Juel née Suenssen
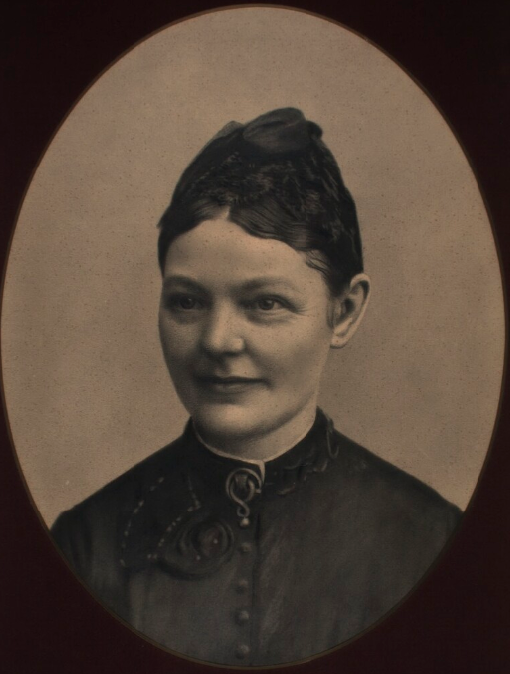
- Born: 20 May 1834; Tønning in the south of Jutland
- Died: 27 October 1904 (aged 70); Copenhagen
- Occupations: Writer and Composer
- Writing career
- Language: Danish

Teckla Violanta Juel née Suenssen (1834–1904) was a Danish writer and composer. Brought up by a mother interested in literature, like her sisters Alfhilda Mechlenburg and Fanny Suenssen, she contributed articles to women's magazines and published novels and short stories. Furthermore, using the name Teckla, she published a number of songs for which she had composed the music.

== Biography ==
Born on 20 May 1834 in Tønning in the south of Jutland, Teckla Violanda Suenssen was the youngest daughter of Captain Johan Fedder Carsten Suenssen (1795–1840) and his wife Margaret née Juel. She was brought up by a mother deeply interested in literature with two sisters who also became writers. In August 1867, she married the schoolteacher at Aalborg Cathedral School Axel Georg Juel (1822–1903) with whom she had two children: Margrethe (1869) and Elise Henriette (1871).

Teckla Suenssen spent her childhood in the south of Jutland where her father was a sea captain based in Tønning. When he died in 1840, the family moved to Copenhagen where she grew up in a happy home. In 1848, she moved to Norway where she spent the next two years, frequently returning between stays on Langeland and in Copenhagen.

When she was 16, she published anonymously the song "Fiskerpigens Klagesang" (The Fisherwoman's Lament) for which she had also composed the music. Reprinted in three editions, it was followed by similar songs: "Vemod" (Melancholy, 1851), "Længsel" (Longing, 1856) and "Amors Rekrut" (Amor's Recruit, 1858). She went on to write two long narrative poems, "Ivan Mikkel" (1860) and, using the pen mane Johan Fedder, "Den sorte Ravn" (The Black Raven, 1861).

Published anonymously, her first novel tells the romantic story of Caja. It first appeared in installments in Dagbladet before being published as a book in 1860. Also published anonymously were Planterens Datter (The Planter's Daughter, 1864) and I Jylland (In Jutland, 1866) Using the pen name Carl Krone, she published a book containing two short stories, Hans Lindberg and Jeppe, in 1866 and as Thorvald Thure, Blancogade Nummer Syv in 1867.

After marrying Axel Juel in 1867, she spent the next ten years in Aalborg where her husband was employed. In 1876, the family settled in Copenhagen. Later publications included three novels: Hittebarnet (1870), Zigeunerbarnet (1871), Karen (1874) and the short story collection Paa Skraaplanet (1891). Together with her two sisters, she contributed to the children's book of stories and verse, Ei blot til Lyst (1880) and the play En Skilsmisse (A Divorce, 1872). The play was presented at Copenhagen's Royal Danish Theatre as Et Ægteskab in Fare (A Marriage in Danger) in 1875.

Many of her works were translated into Swedish and German. According to Schriftsteller-Lexikon der Gegenwart, she gained considerable popularity in Germany.

Teckla Juel died in Copenhagen on 27 October 1904.
