= Ulla Dahlerup =

Danish women's rights activist and novelist (born 1942)

Ulla Dahlerup (born 1942) is a Danish journalist, writer and women's rights activist. She was one of the most prominent members of the Danish Red Stocking Movement in the early 1970s, an episode she used as a basis for her 1979 novel Søstrene (The Sisters). More recently, she has campaigned for the Danish People's Party.

== Biography ==
Dahlerup was born on 21 March 1942 in Testrup Folk High School south of Aarhus, where her father Erik Dahlerup was principal and her mother Elin Høgsbro Appel, a teacher. Together with her sisters, the literary historian Pil (born 1939) and Drude (born 1945), a women's rights researcher. When she was seven, the parents divorced and the children moved with their mother to Allerød. Despite her continued interest in folk high schools, Dahlerup did not matriculate as a student but spent a year in Switzerland after taking the realeksam. She then worked in a variety of unskilled jobs before becoming a freelance journalist, translator and author.

After publishing two unsuccessful novels in the early 1960s, Dahlerup was awarded a monetary prize for her Sankt Jørgens gård, a collection of short stories published in 1969. In 1963, she had already come into the limelight after suggesting in a television programme that all teenage girls should be allowed to have a diaphragm for birth control without their parents consent, until then only issued to those over 18. As a result, some 20,000 abortions a year were performed illegally.

In 1970, she again hit the headlines with her involvement in the Individ og Samfund women's organization and in the Danish Red Stocking Movement, especially when, together with 25 other women, she refused to pay more than 80% of a bus fare on the grounds that women's salaries were only 80% of men's. In 1979, she severed connections with the women's movement on the grounds that it was too marxist.

From around the year 2000, Dahlerup has made controversial statements on immigrants and refugees. In 2004, she was a Danish People's Party candidate for the European Parliament.
