= Anna Louise Stevnhøj =

Danish journalist and writer (born 1963)

Anna Louise Stevnhøj (born 1963) is a Danish journalist and writer. She is especially known for her writing about children, sexuality, youngsters and health. When she has not worked freelance, she has been employed at magazines and the Danish organization Boerns Vilkaar/BV (The Conditions of Children).

== Works ==
- "Elsk med omtanke" (Love with Consideration) 1994
- "Før den første gang" (Before the First Time) 2000
- "Efter den første gang" (After the First Time) 2003
- ”Beretninger om Depression” (Stories of Depression) written with Jan Andreasen 2003
- “G-streng og cybersex I børnestørrelse” (G-string and cybersex in children’s sizes) BV 2003
- “Fortællinger om børn og terapi” (Tales about children and therapy) written with Marie Birk 2004
- ”Skilsmissefamilien” (The Divorce Family) (BV) 2007
- “Skilsmissebørn” (Divorce Children) (BV) written with Bente Boserup 2007
- "Børn og Seksualitet" (Children and Sexuality) BV 2008
- “En mors bekendelser” (A Mom’s Confessions)
- "Gyldendals Bog om Barnet" (Gyldendal's Book about the Child)
- “Gyldendals Leksikon om børn 1-15 år” (Gyldendal’s Dictionary about Children ages 1–15)
