= Karin-Lis Svarre =

Karin-Lis Svarre née Graverholt (5 December 1946, Vordingborg — 24 June 2009) was a Danish journalist and international development specialist. She is remembered for working as a foreign correspondent and studio host for Danmarks Radio's television news from 1977 and for being appointed head of information at the United Nations Food and Agriculture Organization in 1996. As a writer, she published works on Thailand and Mozambique as well as a cookbook.

== Early life ==
Born in Vordingborg on 5 December 1946, Karin-Lis Graverholt was the daughter of the optician Peter Graverholt (1914–70) and his wife Inger Margrethe née Kofoed (1918–94), an engraver. The family's third child, surviving her two brothers, one of whom died young while the other drowned when he was 18. Particularly gifted at school, after matriculating from Vordingborg Gymnasium in 1965, she was a student of social studies at the universities of Edinburgh, Berkeley and Copenhagen. She was however primarily interested in journalism and became a trainee at the newspaper Sjællands Tidende (1969–72).

== Career ==
After a short spell with the Danish newspaper Kristeligt Dagblad and a year at the World Press Institute in Minnesota, in 1974 she joined the Danish newspaper Politiken. In 1977, she moved to Danmarks Radio where she worked for the foreign editorial department of the news programme TV-Avisen, She proved to be a competent television reporter and studio host, covering mainly third.world developments including documentaries from Africa.

After a short period as a freelance correspondent in Bangkok, in 1991 she was appointed information director at the Danish Refugee Council. From 1993 to 1996, she was responsible for developing the Nordic/SADC Journalism Centre in Maputo, Mozambique.

In 1996, she was recruited by the FAO as director of information at the organization's headquarter in Rome where she coordinated an international summit meeting only a few months later. In 199 she moved to Stockholm as information coordinator for the International Institute for Democracy and Electoral Assistance.

After contracting a serious illness in 2003, Karin-Lis Svarre died on 24 June 2009.
