= Caja Rude =

Danish writer and journalist

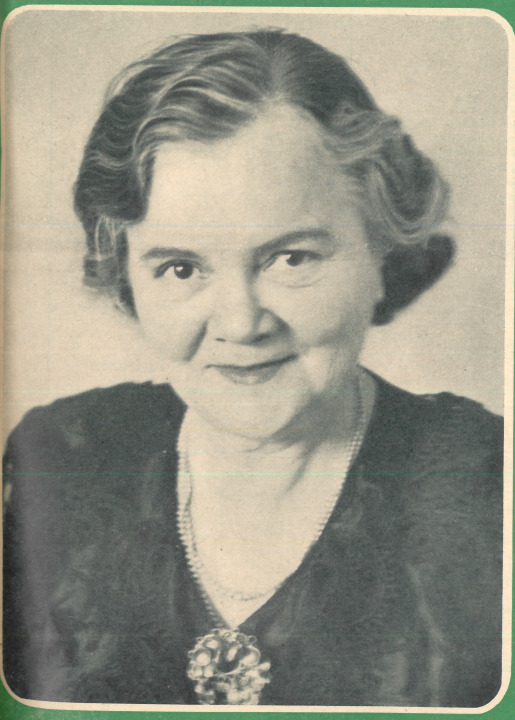
Caja Rude

Caja Rude née Løvgreen (1884–1949) was a popular Danish novelist, short story writer and journalist. Most of her works were for young women but she also wrote for adults. A keen supporter of women's rights, she frequently addressed the need for women to be better educated in order to become self-sufficient and take up jobs in industry. She covered women's affairs for the journal Social-Democraten. Her most popular work Kammerat Tinka (1938) emphasizes women's education, class consciousness and the need for a working-class culture.

== Biography ==
Born in the Frederiksberg district of Copenhagen on 11 July 1884, Caja Løvgreen was the daughter of Axel Peter Carl Løvgreen (born 1847), a stationmaster, and his wife Wilhelmine Christine née Oest (1859–1939). She was one of the family's eight children. In July 1907, she married the factory foreman Lauritz Christian Rude (1879–1965).

Caja Løvgreen had a difficult childhood as her father left the family when she was eight. She spent a short period at a Catholic school in Randers but had to leave when she was ten. When she was 17, she went to Copenhagen to work as a maid. Keen to become a writer, she educated herself and for a period attended the Conservatory. After her marriage, she moved to the provinces with her husband, first to Stege on the island of Møn, then to Korsør in the west of Zealand. She became involved in the Danish Women's Society, chairing the local branch for a time.

After the marriage broke up, Caja Rude earned her living first as a cinema pianist but increasingly as a journalist, becoming a regular contributor from 1915. In 1925, her play Som Kvinder var – som Kvinder er (As Women Were - As Women Are) was performed in Slagelse, followed in 1926 by Arvefjenden (The Hereditary Enemy) which was staged in Helsingør. Her first book, the short story collection Skyggebilleder (Shadow Portraits), depicting figures from the bottom of the societal ladder, was published in 1929.

Caja Rude died in Copenhagen on 10 November 1949 and is buried in the Assistens Cemetery.
