= Suzanne Giese =

Danish writer and women's rights activist

Suzanne Giese (1946–2012) was a Danish writer and women's rights activist. She was one of the prominent members of the Danish Red Stocking Movement in the early 1970s. In 1973, together with her husband Claus Clausen, she established the Tiderne Skifter publishing house which promoted literature on feminism and women's rights.

Suzanne Gieze died on 28 July 2012 after a short illness.
