= Sissel-Jo Gazan =

Danish biologist and writer

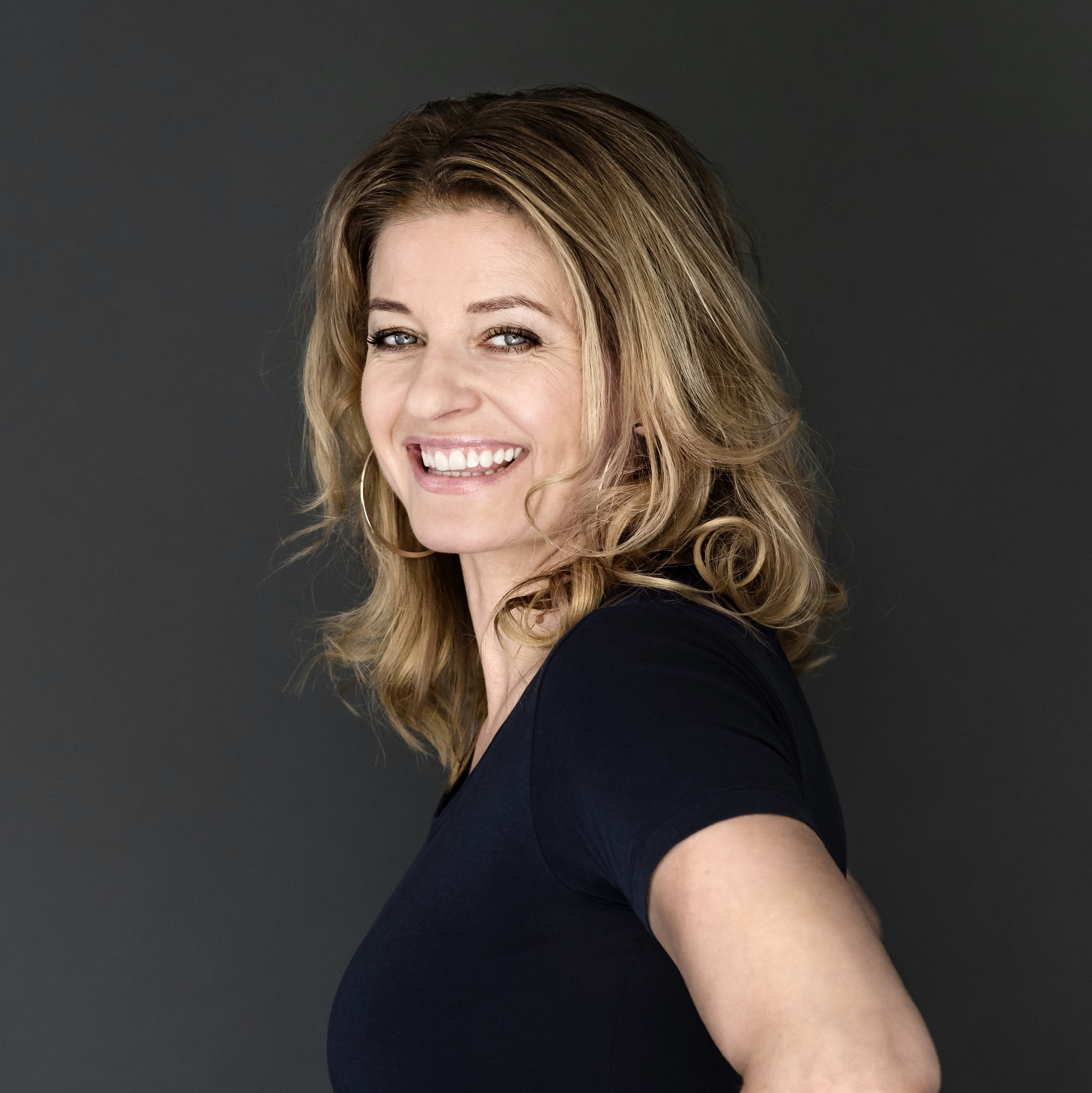
Sissel-Jo Gazan (2018)

Sissel-Jo Gazan (born 20 December 1973, Aarhus) is a Danish biologist and writer who gained wide recognition in 2008 for her novel Dinosaurens fjer, translated into English as The Dinosaur Feather. She publishes under the name S. J. Gazan.

== Early life and education ==
Born on 20 December 1973 in Aarhus, Sissel-Jo Gazan is the daughter of the journalist Paul Gazan and the schoolteacher and writer Janne Heigård. Her interest in writing began as a child when she sailed around the Mediterranean with her mother, describing what she saw, first with her mother's help, then on her own. Raised in Aarhus, she attended the Marselisborg Gymnasium where she matriculated in 1992. She went on to study at the University of Copenhagen where she earned a Master of Science degree in biology, specializing in the origin of birds among the dinosaurs.

== Career ==
Gazan made her debut as a novelist in 1995 with Når man kysser i august (When you kiss in August) which she wrote during a long stay in Lisbon. Her next two novels were also written during her travels: Et barn for sig (A child of your own, 1997) while in the Philippines and Vigtigt at vide om Ludmilla (Important to know about Ludmilla, 2003) on study trips to Hamburg and London. Her works sensitively address topics such as the development of one's identity, grief and love and insights into life and language.

But it was not until 2008 that Gazan gained wide recognition with her novel Dinosaurens fjer, translated into English as The Dinosaur Feather which earned her Danmarks Radio's novel prize. A review in the Financial Times described it as a "top-flight thriller that’s poisonous, smart and outrageously entertaining".

More recent works include Svalens Graft (2013), published in English as The Arc of the Swallow, another thriller covering problems resulting from the commercial interests of Danish immunology research. This was followed in 2017 by Blækhat (Ink Cap) set in Aarhus in the 1980s, in 2020 by Hvide blomster (White Flowers) about a missing teenager on the island of Samsø, and in 2022 by Uglens øje (The Owl's Eye), a follow-up to The Dinosaur Feather set in today's Denmark and again involving pharmaceuticals.
