= Maria Engelbrecht Stokkenbech =

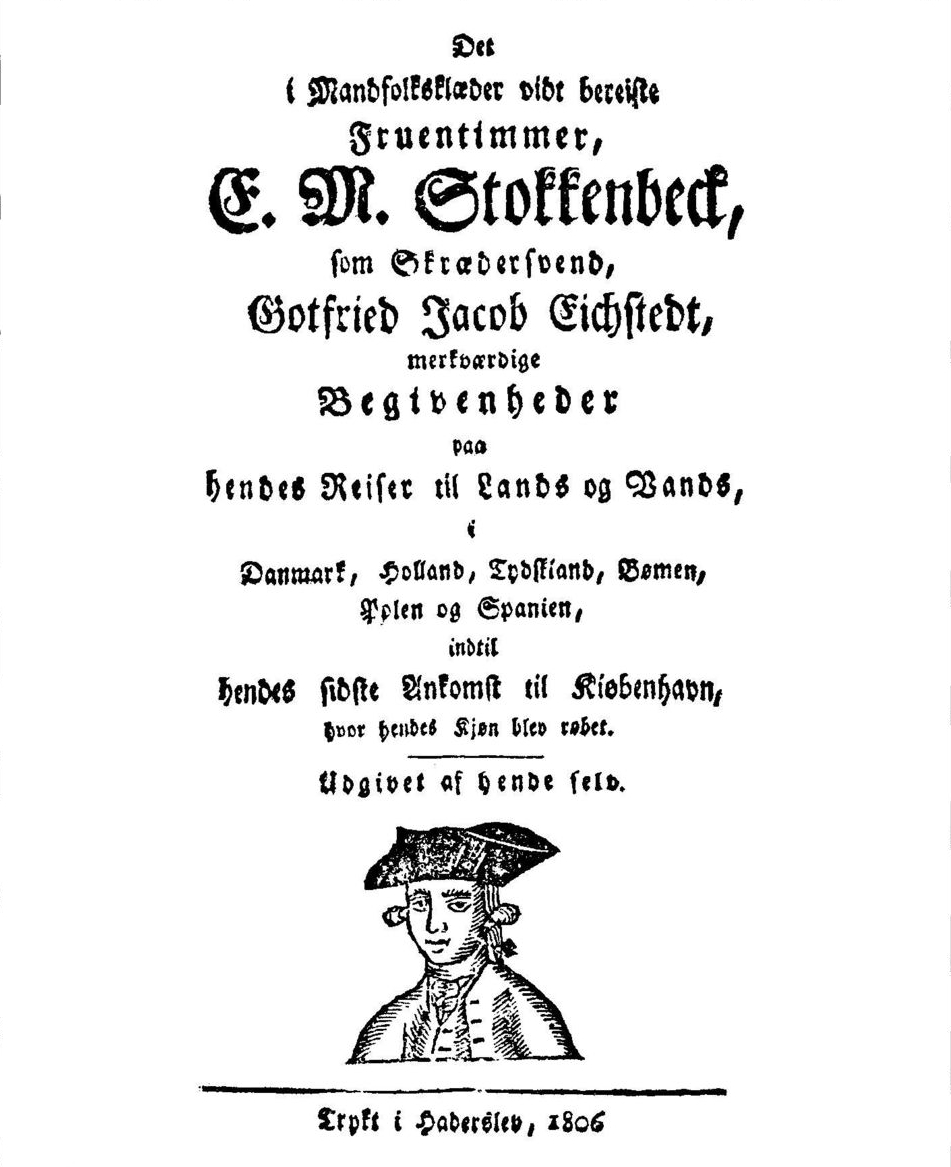
Maria Engelbrecht Stokkenbech's book cover (1806)

Maria Engelbrecht Stokkenbech, also E.M. Stokkenbeck (1759 – after 1806), was a Danish tailor, writer and early feminist who succeeded in earning her own living as a married woman by disguising herself as a man. For about four years in the early 1780s, she traveled across Europe as far as Málaga working as a tailor. Only on her return to Copenhagen in 1784 was her true gender revealed. She managed however to persuade the king to allow her to continue her trade and was authorized to practice as a tailor and hire an apprentice.

She reported these events in her short autobiography Det i Mandfolksklæder vidt bereiste Fruentimmer, E.M. Stokkenbeck, som Skrædersvend, Gotfried Jacob Eichstedt, merkværdige Begivenheder paa hendes Reiser til Lands og Vands, i Danmark, Holland, Tydskland, Boben, Polen og Spanien, indtil hendes sidste Ankomst til Kiobenhavn, hvor hendes Kjon blev robet. Udgivet af hende selv.

== Biography ==
Born in Hamburg in 1759, Maria Engelbrecht was the youngest of 10 children. After her father died when she was just one year old, her mother brought her up on the island of Ærø. When she was 12, she worked as a waitress in a tavern in Kiel before moving to Copenhagen where she was a maid in a seaman's home. After a period of sickness, she moved into the home of a woman who taught her how to sew women's clothes. A man who worked in a brewery saw her mending clothes one day and persuaded her to marry him. The marriage was not successful as her husband used all his earnings for drink. She left him and moved to Kiel but as a married woman could find no work. She realized it would be easier to find a job as a man and had a tailor sew her a man's suit that would fit her, telling him it was for her brother.

Dressed as a man, she called herself Gotfried Jacob Eichstedt and found work as a tailor's apprentice. The other workers initially laughed at her as she could only sew women's clothes but she diligently learned to sew men's trousers and suits as expertly as the others. She joined her male co-workers in bars, smoking, drinking, playing cards and urinating like a man with the help of a horn. For a time she worked in Poland, then in Germany. It was not always easy to find work and she had to travel on, visiting one country after another. Eventually, she found work tailoring on a ship which took her all the way to Málaga in the south of Spain.

In 1784, she returned to Copenhagen where she was recognized as a woman and arrested. After she had explained in court the problems she had encountered with her husband, she was set free on the condition she wore women's clothes. She subsequently asked King Christian VII for permission to open her own business, explaining that she had worked successfully for years and could tailor as well as a man. He sympathized with her and granted her permission to earn a living tailoring clothes for men and to employ an apprentice.

Her book was first published in German in Copenhagen in 1784. A Danish edition was published in Haderslev in 1787 and, with minor revisions, in 1806. An almost identical edition was published in Copenhagen in 1806. Only the 1806 editions contain details of the authorization she received from the king.
