= Hulda Lütken =

Danish poet and novelist

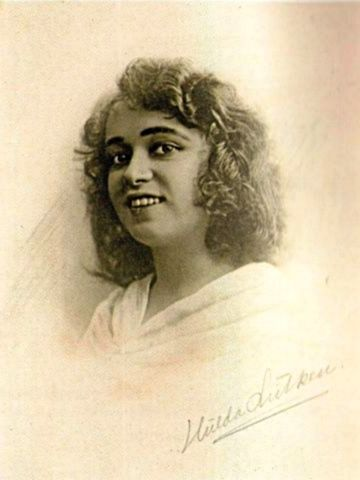
Hulda Lütken

Hulda Dagny Lütken (1896–1946) was a Danish poet and novelist. The underlying theme in her nine poetry collections and five novels is the conflict between desire and moral purity. Her first novel, Degnens Hus (The Deacon's House, 1929), is based on her own experience of two very different parents. Initially writing rather traditional rhyming verse, Drømmen (The Dream), published in 1940, was the first of more experimental works. In 1943, with her memoir Mennesket paa Lerfødder (A Person with Feet of Clay) she embarked on a period of self-reflection questioning her gender identity.

== Early life ==
Born on 5 October 1896 in Elling near Frederikshavn in the far north of Jutland, Hulda Dagny Lütken was the daughter of the schoolmaster Jens Peter Lütken (1859–1919) and his wife Anna Nielsine Martine née Nielsen (1869–1955). In December 1917, she married the plumber Jens Kristian Jensen (born 1897). The marriage was dissolved in 1923.

Educated in her father's school, after a short period as a housemaid she returned home and helped her father to run the school. Her mother, who stemmed from a Romany family, encouraged her to become interested in poetry. She married in 1917 but the marriage was not a success and her only child Poul remained with his father. While still a child, Lütken's poems had been published in local newspapers. In the 1920s, she decided to move to Copenhagen to develop her writing. She made contact with the poet Tom Kristensen and his Valby-Parnas associates but was unable to make a living from her writing and worked as a housekeeper.

== Career as a writer ==
Published in 1927, Lütken's first collection of poems, Lys og Skygge (Light and Shade), was inspired by the traditions of Romanticism but with her novel Degnens Hus (1929) she turned to Realism, describing her own experience of her two very different parents. Her psychological approach is more evident in Lokesæd (Loke Seed, 1931) and De uansvarlige (The Irresponsible, 1933), the latter presenting violent scenes backed by the intense feelings of those involved.

Her collections of poetry, Sjælens Have (The Garden of the Soul, 1931), Lænken (The Chain, 1932), and Elskovs Rose (Rose of Love, 1934), reveal the poet's search for her identity. They increasingly move from traditional rhyming verse to more experimental works with Drømmen (1940) and Klode i Drift (Globe at Work, 1941). Her biographical novel Mennesket paa Lerfødder (1943) reveals her reflections on gender identity as she wonders "Maybe I am a woman with a man's soul." Her last novel, Saa er jeg fri (Then I'll Be Free, 1945), in which the narrator is a man, presents her feelings of masculinity.

Hulda Dagny Lütken died in Elling on 9 July 1946 and was buried in Elling Churchyard.
