= Julie Heins =

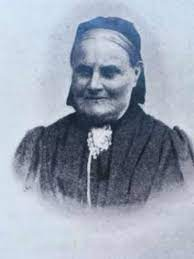
Julie Heins (1898)

Hansine Julie Heins née Nielsdatter baptised Norberg (1822–1902) was a Danish schoolteacher and writer who established her own school for small children in Odense in 1855. She is remembered for her children's reading books which were used in Danish schools. In particular, her Hanebogen (Cockerel Book, 1865), appeared in 23 editions until 1932. Over the years, her school expanded, taking in older children in the late 1870s and embarking on teacher training in the 1880s. After she sold the school in 1883, it became known as Odense Kvindeseminarium.

== Early life ==
Born on 27 September 1822 in Marslev, Kerteminde Municipality, on the island of Funen, Hansine Julie Nielsdatter was the daughter of the unmarried teenager Inger Kristine Nielsen (1805–1887). Her father was possibly the pastry cook Svend Norberg from Næstved or perhaps the caretaker Hans Christian Egholdt (1796–1827) who later married her mother. At her baptism and confirmation she was recorded as Hansine Julie Norberg. In 1841 she married the dentist Frederik Wilhelm Guldbrand Heins (1817–1892). Together they had two children: Carl Charles Mariano (1842) and Marie Elisabeth Olivia Christine (1846).

She was brought up in Næstved by her maternal aunt Maria Elisabeth and her husband Ole Christensen, a merchant. They treated her as their own child in their strongly Christian home, engaging a tutor to ensure her education. Rather than continue her education in Copenhagen, in 1840 she became engaged to the Næstved dentist Frederik Heins, marrying him the following year. In 1848, Heins left the family leaving his wife with two children to care for.

== Career ==
Realizing she needed to improve her education, she attended N. Zahle's School in the summer of 1855. On returning to Odense, she opened her own school "Fru Julie Heins Skole" in the autumn. Including her own daughter, she had just 12 small girls as pupils. She set out to treat children more humanely than was generally the case, soon welcoming boys. As the school became increasingly popular, she included teenage children, receiving support from the folk high school community. In the late 1870s, the school was significantly extended and in the early 1880s three of her pupils passed the teacher training examinations. In 1883, she sold the establishment to Niels Thomsen who continued to operate it as Odense Kvindeseminariu.

Heins' method of teaching children to read did not coincide with existing practice. From 1865, she therefore began to write her own reading books, initially picture books for small children, later for older pupils and ultimately a six-volume comprehensive series. The first volume, Hanebogen, ABC med Billeder efter Skrivelæsemetoden was particularly popular, going through 23 editions up to 1932. For teachers, she published Den første Undervisning i Modersmaalet (Initial Teaching of the Mother Tongue) in 1890. She maintains that it is important to associate all the other school subjects with reading which should not be undertaken in isolation. She was also the author of Aandelige Sange fra Skolen og Hjemmet (Spiritual Songs from School and Home) which proved to be quite a success.

Julie Heins died in Copenhagen on 17 April 1902 and was buried in Næstved Cemetery. Records from Sankt Peders Kirke in Næstved state that she was the daughter of "vagtmester Eckhof" and the foster child of Ole Kristensen Hjalteved". Heins is considered to have been an enterprising teacher but she is remembered above all for her textbooks.
