= Lise Hannestad =

Danish classicist, archaeologist and writer

Lise Hannestad née Budolfsen (born 1943) is a Danish classicist, archaeologist and writer. She joined the staff of Aarhus University in 1971, heading the classical archaeology department from 1989 until her retirement in 2004. She has published many articles and books in English on Greece and Rome in antiquity. Her most recent work is Nicator - Seleucus I and His Empire (2020).

== Biography ==
Born on 15 October 1943 in Holstebro, Lise Hannestad is the daughter of the physician Svend Erik Budolfsen (1916–1987) and the physiotherapist Kirsten Elisabeth Larsen (1918–1989). She is the elder of two daughters. After spending her childhood in Aarhus, when she was 13 she moved with her family to Hjørring where she matriculated at the high school in 1962. She went on to study classical archaeology at the universities of Aarhus and Copenhagen, earning a master's degree from Aarhus University in 1970, followed by a PhD in 1983. During her studies, she married fellow student Niels Hannestad, who later became a professor and assisted her in her archaeological investigations. Their son Steen is an astrophysicist.

Hannestad's main research interest has focused on history rather than the history of art, with special attention to the influence of ancient Greek culture or other cultures. In the mid-1970s, she published two short books on Etruscan culture, The Paris Painter: An Etruscan Vase-painter (1974) and The Followers of the Paris Painter (1976). Her doctoral thesis, Ikaros: The Hellenistic Pottery (1985), examined the Greeks' encounters in the Middle East following the conquests of Alexander the Great. More popular works in Danish include Mad og drikke i det antikke Rom (Food and Drink in Ancient Rome, 1979) and Etruskerne og deres kunst (The Etruscans and Their Art, 1982). The archaeological sites she has investigated in the Middle East and North Africa include Bodrum, Failaka, Segermes, Cephalonia and western Cyprus. In the mid-1990s, she headed Danish interests in Russian-Danish collaboration on researching Greek settlements in the Crimea. More recently, she has coordinated Danish archaeological research into the Silk Road between the Middle East and China.

Since her retirement from Aarhus University in 2004, she has continued to be active, recently publishing a history of Alexander's general and later king, Seleucus, titled Nicator - Seleucus I and His Empire (2020).
