= Karen Syberg =

Danish gender researcher and women's rights activist

Karen Syberg (born 1945) is a Danish author, gender researcher and feminist. In 1970, she was among those who founded the Red Stocking Movement in Denmark. She has since worked as a journalist and author of both fiction and non-fiction.

== Biography and education ==
Karen Syberg was born on 24 December 1945 in Odense, the daughter of Franz Adolf Syberg, an organist and composer, and Gudrun Karen Marie Rasmussen. In 1997, she married Poul Erik Munk Nielsen, with whom she has one child, Kristian, born 1973. She grew up near Kerteminde on the island of Funen. After matriculating from high school in Nyborg, she embarked on studies as a publicity draughtsman but gave them up after a year to study Danish and history in Copenhagen. She also abandoned these, taking up literature, in which she gained an M.A. in 1975.

== Feminism ==
While at university, Syberg helped to found the Danish Red Stocking Movement in 1970. She was also active in setting up the women's camp on Femø in 1971.
