= Anna-Grethe Rischel =

Danish paper historian

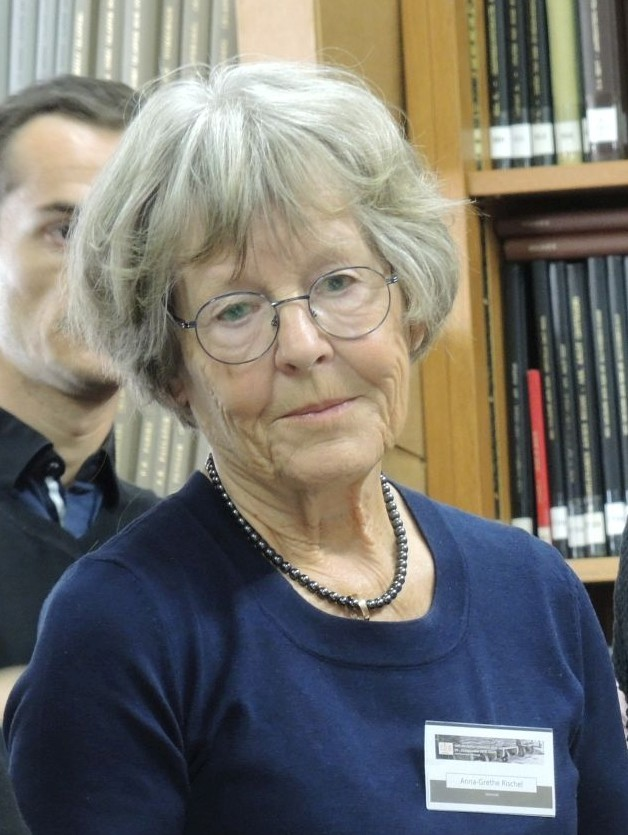
- Anna-Grethe Rischel at IPH-Kongress 2018
- Born: Anna-Grethe Andersen; 7 May 1935 (age 90)

Anna-Grethe Rischel née Andersen (born 7 May 1935 in Copenhagen) is a Danish paper conservator and paper historian and president of the International Association of Paper Historians (IPH). Her special interests lie in macroscopic and microscopic studies of paper technology and paper fibres, covering both Asian and European paper.

== Career ==
Rischel studied at the Textile Department of what is today the Royal Danish Academy of Fine Arts, Schools of Architecture, Design and Conservation (KADK) and worked for many years as a textile printer under the artistic name “Claus”. In 1977 she applied for conservation studies at the School of Conservation of the KADK and received qualifications of a conservator of cultural heritage, in particular, paper and graphic art. In 1980, she started a position as a conservator at the National Museum of Denmark in Brede.

Rischel is known for her work on the 2000-year long history of paper. She was first interested in the subject during her preparation of an exhibition in 1983 featuring Japanese art. She went to Nepal, Thailand and Japan, later also to China, and studied Oriental paper making at its sources. She has written on how the work of botanist Julius von Wiesner impacted research into paper, the paper used by Hans Christian Andersen in his drawings, the oldest surviving paper manuscripts, and how to use analysis of paper to detect forgeries.

Between 1993 and 2000 Anna-Grethe Rischel headed the section for paper technology and fiber materials of the National Museum Conservation Department. She continued to work as a conservator on the important collection of paper brought together from numerous countries and owned by the museum. This gave her the opportunity to do research on the technology and development of paper and became the starting point for the development of some specific macroscopic and microscopic survey methods.

After her retirement in 2005 she continued her analysis activity on handmade paper. In the 2014 book On paper: the everything of its two-thousand-year history, Nicholas A. Basbanes describes the extended conversations he had with Rischel, whom he describes as "an authority in paper analysis". Rischel wrote the foreword to a 2018 book on paper.

== Memberships ==
In 1986, Anna-Grethe Rischel became a member of the Nordic Paper History Association and of the de:International Association of Paper Historians (IPH). She also became a member of the British Association of Paper Historians. In 2008, she was elected to be the 7th President of IPH as first Scandinavian and first woman, and as of 2021 she is president of the society. In this role she has presided over multiple meetings held by IPH. Until 2018, she served as editor of the periodical IPH Paper History. Since 2008 she has also been a member of the parish council of Birkerød.

== Selected publications ==
- Rischel, Anna-Grethe (2001). "Through the microscope lens: classification of Oriental paper technology and fibres". Looking at Paper / Ed. By John Slavin, Linda Sutherland ...: 179–188. OCLC 887063262.
- Raschmann, Simone-Christiane; Rischel, Anna-Grethe (2012). Altturkische Handschriften. Teil 18, Teil 1, Teil 18, Teil 1 (in German). Stuttgart: F. Steiner. ISBN 978-3-515-10108-0. OCLC 866817326.
- Ernst, Torben; Rischel, Anna-Grethe (2005). "Painting behind glass". Zeitschrift für Kunsttechnologie und Konservierung: 39–48. ISSN 0931-7198. OCLC 887276869.
- Rischel, Anna-Grethe (2014). "Julius von Wiesner and his importance for scientific research and analysis of paper/ Anna-Grethe Rischel". Paper History. ISSN 0250-8338. OCLC 1185462284.
- Rischel, Anna-Grethe (2004). "Analysis of the papermaker's choice of fibrous materials and technology along the paper road". Paper as a Medium of Cultural Heritage: Archaeology and Conservation (Rome-Verona, 2002). OCLC 908548675.

== Personal life ==
In 1961 she married Jørgen Rischel, a professor of linguistics at the University of Copenhagen. In 2010, an edited volume of her husband's works was dedicated to Anna-Grethe to acknowledge her contribution to his research.
