= Femø =

- Island
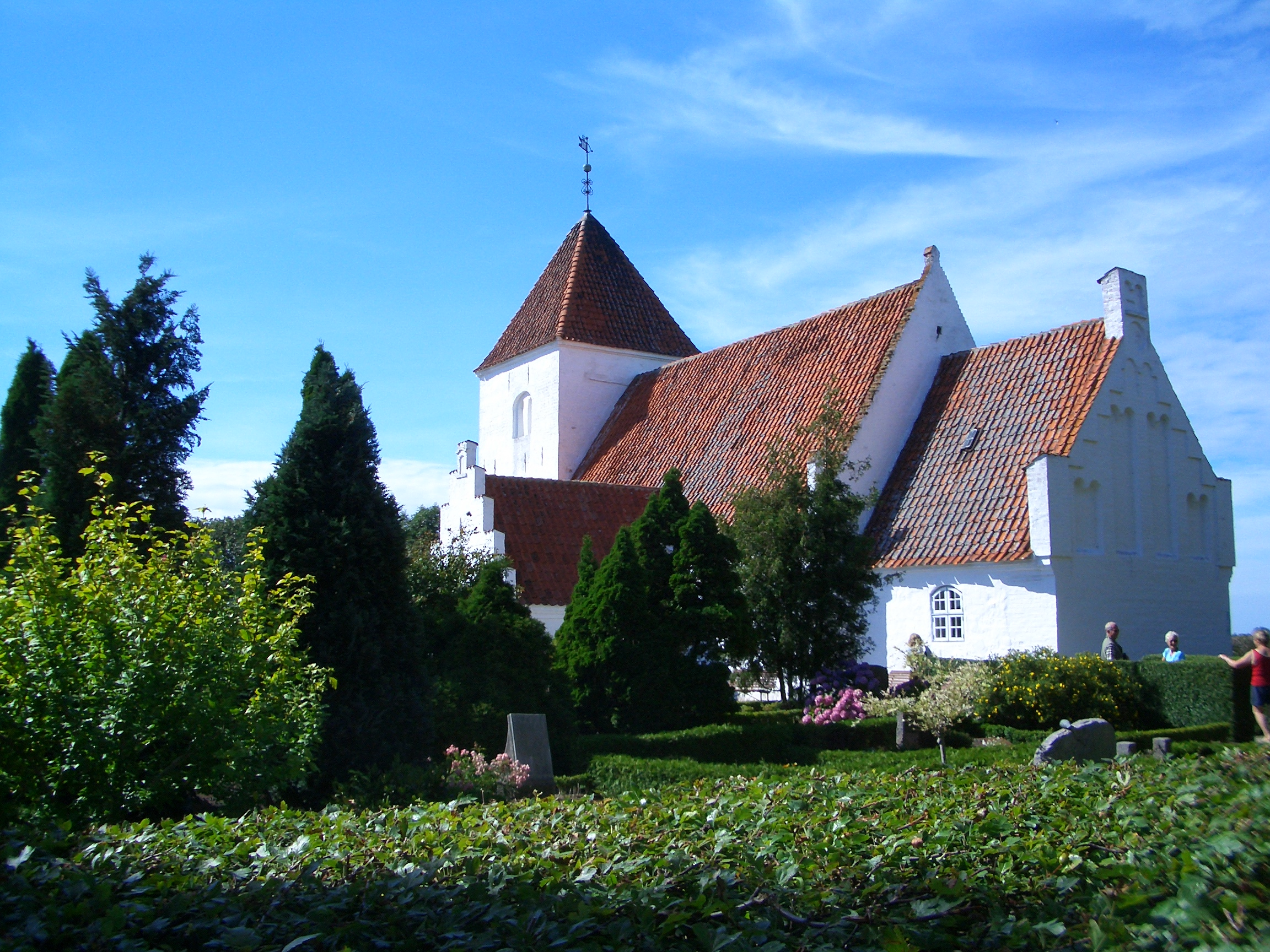
- Femø Church

- Femø is north of Lolland (bottom center)
- Coordinates: 54°58′0″N 11°33′0″E
- Country: Denmark
- Region: Region Sjælland
- Municipality: Lolland Municipality

Area
  - Total: 11.38 km^{2} (4.39 sq mi)

Population (2017)
  - Total: 100
  - Density: 8.8/km^{2} (23/sq mi)
- Time zone: UTC+1 (CET)
  - Summer (DST): UTC+2 (CEST)

Femø is a Danish island north of Lolland. The island covers an area of 11.38 km^{2}. Femø had 147 inhabitants in 2009, and 112 inhabitants 2023.

== Women's camp ==
Every year since 1971 women have met and spent their holiday together in the north-east corner of the island. Initially attracting women from all parts of the women's rights movement, more recently it has primarily attracted lesbians, although all women are welcome. Most weeks are solely for Danish women but an 'international' week takes place once each year bringing women from all over Europe. In 2005 it was decided to open the camp to trans women, so long as they have proper identification. This was a major historical step as it had been discussed a number of times previously but always voted against by the majority of the members of the camp.

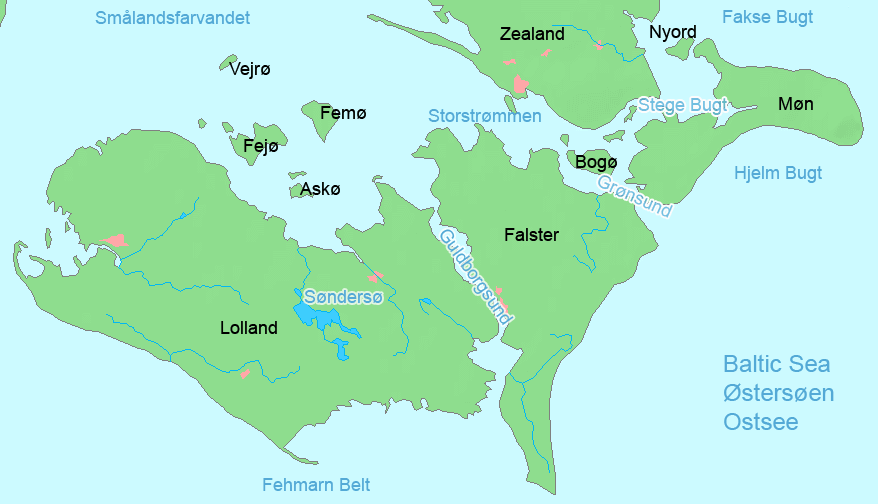
Femø is west of Falster, south of Zealand, north of Askø and Lolland & east of Fejø.

Each summer more than 250 women visit Kvindelejren (Danish for "the women's camp") lasts about 8–9 weeks every summer, starting with the "building-up-the-camp-week" where all the main tents are erected; the kitchen-, bar-, children's-, toilet- and the four sleeping-tents. During the summer all weeks have different themes, including a children's week, a sports week, a body & soul week, one or two international weeks, a crealternative week, a debateweek, and the final week where the tents and the entire camp are taken down and packed away for the winter.

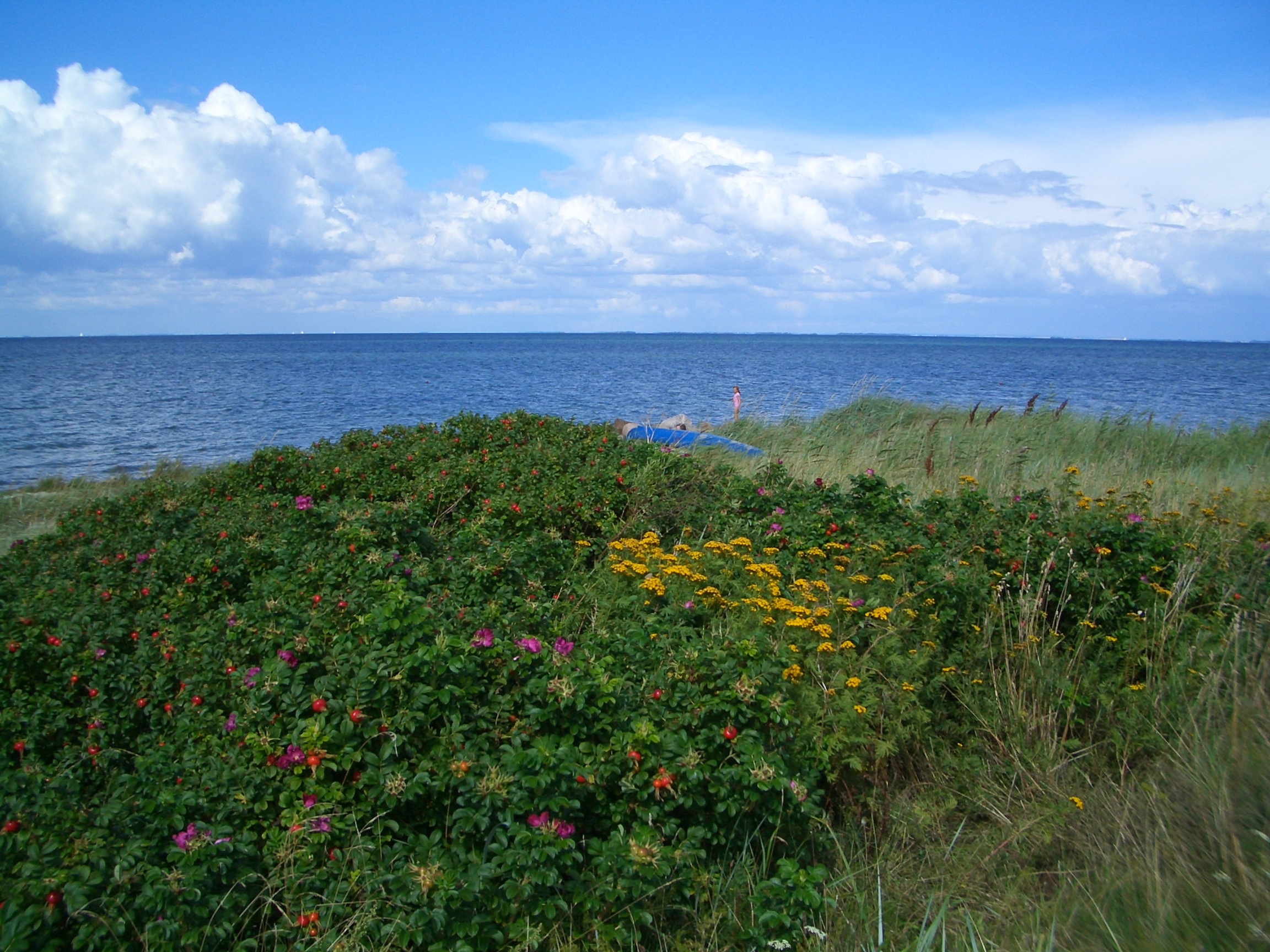
Femø in summer

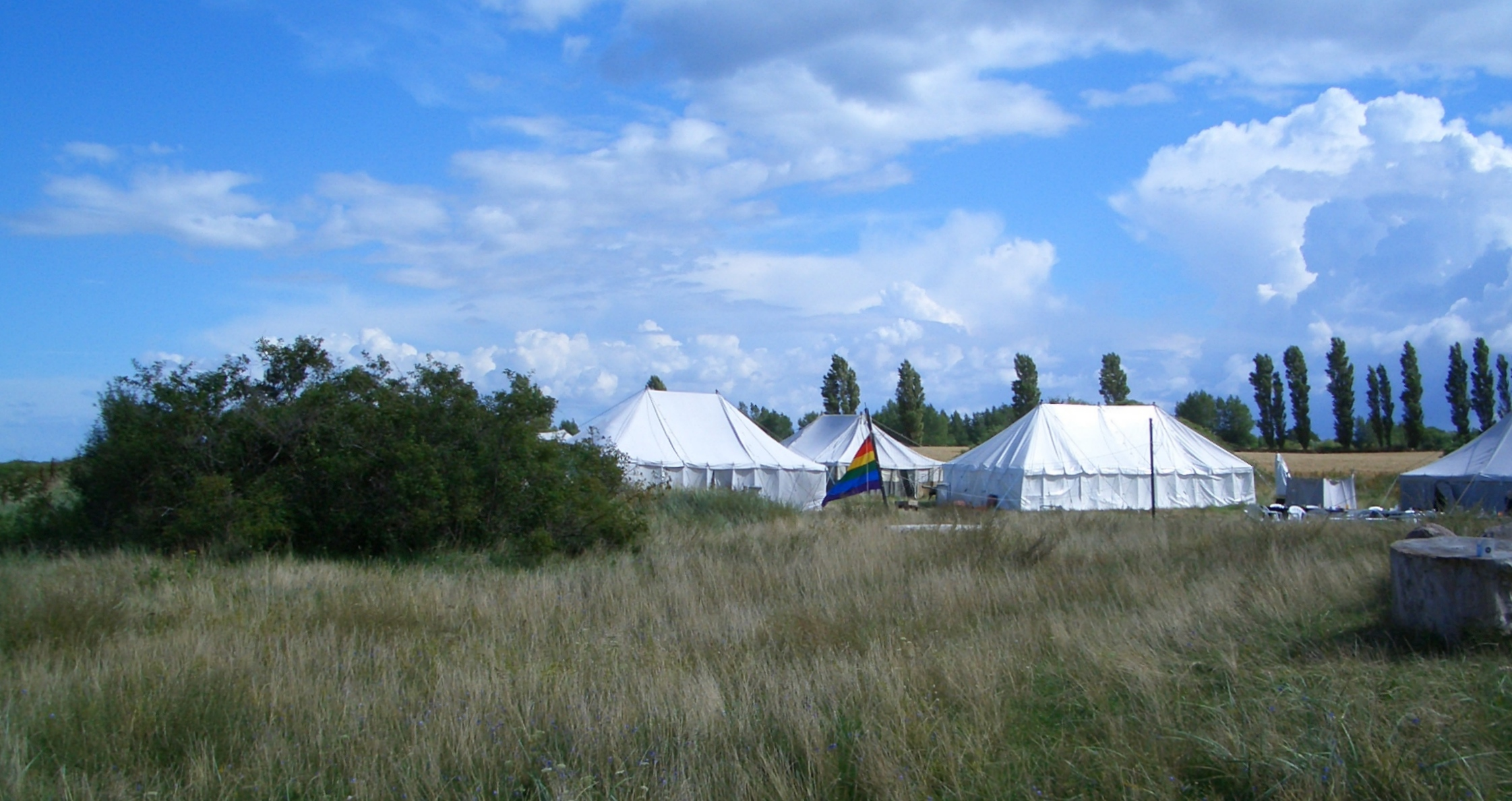
The women's camp

== See also ==
- List of islands of Denmark
