= List of Danes =

This is a list of notable Danish people.

== Actors ==
- Ellen Aggerholm (1882–1963), stage and screen actress
- Ane Grethe Antonsen (1855–1930), actress
- Anna Bård (1980–), model, actress
- Gry Bay (1974–), actress
- Rasmus Bjerg (1976–), actor
- Anna Bloch (1868–1953), actress
- Lars Bom (1961–), actor
- Charlotte Bournonville (1832–1911), actress and opera singer
- Johanne Brun (1874–1954), opera singer
- Hans Egede Budtz (1889–1968), actor
- Poul Bundgaard (1922–1998), actor
- Jesper Christensen (1948–), actor
- Nikolaj Coster-Waldau (1970–), actor
- Karl Dane (1886–1934), silent film actor, comedian
- Mille Dinesen (1974–), actress
- Uffe Ellemann-Jensen (1941–2022), Minister of Foreign Affairs and President of the European Liberals (ALDE)
- Olaf Fønss (1882–1949), silent film actor
- Morten Grunwald (1934–2018), actor
- Ruth Guldbæk (1919–2006), opera singer
- John Hahn-Petersen (1930–2006), actor
- Caroline Halle-Müller (1755–1826), actor, singer and dancer
- Holger Juul Hansen, (1924–2013), actor
- Betty Hennings (1850–1939), actress, famous for her roles in Ibsen's plays
- Jean Hersholt (1886–1956), film actor (Academy Awards Jean Hersholt Humanitarian Award)
- Iben Hjejle (1971–), actress
- Astrid Holm (1893–1961), actress
- Gudrun Houlberg (1889–1940), actress
- Inge Hvid-Møller (1912–1970), actress and theatre director
- Allan Hyde (1989–), actor
- Bodil Ipsen (1889–1964), actress
- Katja K (1968–), ex-adult performer, actor
- Tina Kiberg (1958–), opera singer
- Lone Koppel (1938–), opera singer
- Nikita Klæstrup (1994–), political commentator, model, reality TV star
- Nikolaj Lie Kaas (1973–), actor
- Bodil Kjer (1917–2003), actress
- Makka Kleist (born 1951), Greenlandic actress
- Brigitte Kolerus (1941–2001), actress and theatre director
- Tenna Kraft (1885–1954), opera singer
- Johanne Krarup-Hansen (1870–1958), opera singer
- Lilly Lamprecht (1887–1976), opera singer
- Dorothy Larsen (1911–1990), opera singer
- Lau Lauritzen Jr. (1910–1977), director, actor, producer
- Thure Lindhardt (1974–), actor
- Julie Lund (1979–), actress
- Augusta Lütken (1855–1910), opera singer
- Mia Lyhne (1971–), film and television actress
- Anders Matthesen (1975–), actor, comedian
- Svend Melsing (1888–1946), actor, playwright
- Svend Methling (1891–1977), actor
- Mads Mikkelsen (1965–), actor
- Lars Mikkelsen (1964–), actor
- Viggo Mortensen (1958–), actor (half Danish)
- Sigrid Neiiendam (1873–1955), actress
- Birthe Neumann (1947–), actress at the Royal Danish Theatre
- Asta Nielsen (1883–1972), silent film star, actress
- Brigitte Nielsen (1963–), actress, former wife of Sylvester Stallone
- Connie Nielsen (1965–), film actress
- Oda Nielsen (1851–1936), actress in Copenhagen theatres
- Ghita Nørby (1935–), film actress
- Jens Okking (1939–2018), actor
- Kirsten Olesen (1949–), actress
- Dagmar Orlamundt (1863–1939), comic actress
- Elna Panduro (1882–1983), actress, operetta singer
- Dirch Passer (1926–1980), actor
- Johanne Pedersen-Dan (1860–1934), actress and operetta singer
- Ulf Pilgaard (1940–2024), actor
- Søren Pilmark (1955–), actor
- Clara Pontoppidan (1883–1975), actress
- Valdemar Psilander (1884–1917), silent film star
- Poul Reichhardt (1913–1985), actor
- Asbjørn Riis (1957–), actor, professional wrestler
- Kirsten Rolffes (1928–2000), actress
- Lisbeth Cathrine Amalie Rose (1738–1793), actress
- Louise Sahlgreen (1818–1891), opera singer
- Emilie Sannom (1886–1931), actress and stunt woman
- Johanne Louise Schmidt (1983–), actress
- Jonas Schmidt (1973–), actor
- Ib Schønberg (1902–1955), actor
- Clara Schønfeld (1856–1938), actress
- Else Schøtt (1895–1989), opera singer
- Ingeborg Skov (1893–1990), actress
- Lis Smed (1914–1944), actress
- Ingeborg Spangsfeldt (1895–1968), early film actress
- Ove Sprogøe (1919–2004), actor
- Paprika Steen (1964–), film actress and director
- Karl Stegger (1913–1980), actor
- Ingeborg Steffensen (1888–1964), opera singer
- Inger Stender (1912–1989), stage, film and television actress
- Yutte Stensgaard (1946–), film and television actress
- Ebba Thomsen (1887–1973), silent movie actor
- Emma Thomsen (1863–1910), actress
- Ulrich Thomsen (1963–), actor
- Sven-Ole Thorsen (1944–), actor
- Emilie Ullerup (1984–), actress
- Nicolai Vemming (born 1961), theatre producer and director
- Soffy Walleen (1861–1940), actress
- Lilian Weber Hansen (1911–1987), opera singer
- Charlotte Wiehe-Berény (1865–1947), ballet dancer and actress
- Viggo Wiehe (1874–1956), actor
- Carlo Wieth (1885–1943), actor
- Ebba Wilton (1896–1951), opera singer
- Lulu Ziegler (1903–1973), actress, singer and theatre director
- Marie Zinck (1789–1823), actress and opera singer

== Archaeologists ==
- Frans Blom (1893–1963)
- Peter Oluf Brøndsted (1780–1842), classic archaeologist
- Peter Glob (1911–1985)
- Erik Holtved (1899–1981), Greenland
- Sanne Houby-Nielsen (1960–), Danish-Swedish archaeologist and museum director
- Lis Jacobsen (1882–1961), philologist, runologist
- Eigil Knuth (1903–1996), Greenland
- Therkel Mathiassen (1892–1967), Arctic
- Christian Jürgensen Thomsen (1788–1865), archaeologist
- Jens Jacob Asmussen Worsaae (1821–1885), archaeologist, historian and politician

== Architects and designers ==
- Rigmor Andersen (1903–1995), furniture designer
- Axel Berg (1856–1929), architect
- Antoine de Bosc de la Calmette (1752–1803), landscape architect
- Ellen Braae (1965–), landscape architect
- Karen Clemmensen (1917–2001), architect
- Sophy A. Christensen (1867–1893), furniture designer
- Vilhelm Dahlerup (1826–1907), architect
- Knud V. Engelhardt (1882–1931), designer
- Inger Exner (1926–), architect
- Johannes Exner (1926–2015), architect
- Jørgen Gammelgaard (1938–1991), furniture designer
- Jan Gehl (1947–), architect, urban planner
- Kaj Gottlob (1887–1976), architect and furniture designer
- Ragna Grubb (1903–1961), architect
- Andreas Hallander (1755–1828), Golden Age architect
- Christina Liljenberg Halstrøm (1977–), furniture designer
- Christian Frederik Hansen (1756–1845), architect
- Christian Hansen (1803–1883), architect active mainly in Athens and Copenhagen
- Erik Hansen (1927–2016), architect
- Theophilus Hansen (1813–1891), architect active in Athens and Vienna
- Caspar Frederik Harsdorff (1735–1799), Golden Age architect
- Malene Hauxner (1942–2012), architect
- Piet Hein (1905–1996)
- Poul Henningsen (1894–1967), author, architect, designer
- Peter Hvidt (1916–1986), architect and furniture designer
- Anna Maria Indrio (1943–), architect
- Bjarke Ingels (1974–), architect
- Andreas Jeppe Iversen (1888–1979), furniture designer
- Arne Jacobsen (1902–1971), architect
- Grete Jalk (1920–2006), furniture designer
- Georg Jensen (1866–1935), silversmith, designer
- Jacob Jensen (1926–2015), designer
- Jens Jensen (1860–1951), landscape architect
- Timothy Jacob Jensen (1962–), designer
- Finn Juhl (1912–1989)
- Jørgen Kastholm (1931–2007), furniture designer
- Bodil Kjær (1932–), architect and furniture designer
- Jacob Kjær (1896–1957), furniture designer
- Hanne Kjærholm (1930–2009), architect
- Jens Christian Kofoed (1864–1941), architect
- Eva Koppel (1916–2006), architect
- Mette Lange (graduated 1990), architect, mobile schools for India
- Henning Larsen (1925–2013), architect
- Mogens Lassen (1901–1987), architect
- Vilhelm Lauritzen (1894–1984), architect and furniture designer
- Marie Gudme Leth (1895–1997), textile designer
- Aksel Bender Madsen (1916–2000), furniture designer
- Anne Sofie Madsen (1979–), fashion designer
- Dorte Mandrup-Poulsen (1961–), architect
- Ferdinand Meldahl (1827–1908), architect
- Børge Mogensen (1914–1972), designer
- Orla Mølgaard-Nielsen (1907–1993), architect and furniture designer
- Elna Møller (1913–1994), principal editor of Danmarks Kirker
- Ibi Trier Mørch (1910–1980), designer, especially as a silversmith and glazier
- Hans Olsen (1919–1992), furniture designer
- Johan Martin Quist (1755–1818), Golden Age architect
- Søren Rasmussen (1954–), architect, designer
- Steen Eiler Rasmussen (1898–1990), architect
- Lise Roel (1928–2017), architect
- Rudolph Rothe (1802–1877), landscape architect
- Kasper Salto (1957–), designer
- Jens Martin Skibsted (1970–), designer
- Lene Tranberg (1956–), architect, co-founder of Lundgaard & Tranberg
- Susanne Ussing (1940–1998), architect
- Jan Utzon (1944–), architect
- Jørn Utzon (1918–2008), architect, Sydney Opera House
- Kim Utzon (1957–), architect
- Henrik Valeur (1966–), architect
- Gertrud Vasegaard (1913–2007), ceramist
- Arne Vodder (1926–2009), furniture designer and architect
- Vilhelm Theodor Walther (1819–1892), architect
- Hans J. Wegner (1914–2007), designer
- Lone Wiggers (1963–), architect
- Vilhelm Wohlert (1920–2007), architect, Louisiana Museum of Modern Art
- Kurt Østervig (1912–1986), furniture designer

== Artists ==
- Nikolaj Abraham Abildgaard (1744–1809), painter
- Else Alfelt (1910–1974), painter
- Merete Barker (1944–), painter
- Wilhelm Bendz (1804–1832), painter
- Albert Bertelsen (1921–2019), painter
- Ejler Bille (1910–2004), painter
- Johanne Bindesbøll (1851–1934), textile artist
- Herman Wilhelm Bissen (1798–1868), sculptor
- Lars Bo (1924–1999), etcher
- Jørgen Boberg (1940–2009), painter
- Kay Bojesen (1886–1958), silversmith, designer
- Peter Brandes (1944–2025), painter, sculptor and ceramic artist
- Thorald Brendstrup (1812–1883), painter
- Anders Bundgaard (1864–1937), sculptor
- Emil Bærentzen (1799–1868), painter and lithographer
- Anne Marie Carl-Nielsen (1863–1945), sculptor
- Johannes Carstensen (1924–2010), painter, stained glass artist
- Poul Simon Christiansen (1855–1933), painter
- Ingvar Cronhammar (1947–2021), Swedish-born sculptor
- Carl Dahl (1812–1865), painter
- Kirsten Dehlholm (1945–2024), scenic artist
- Heinrich Dohm (1875–1940), painter
- Anton Dorph (1831–1914), painter
- Christoffer Wilhelm Eckersberg (1783–1853), painter
- Heinrich Eddelien (1802–1852), painter
- Gottfred Eickhoff (1902–1982)
- Olafur Eliasson (1967–), sculptor, installation, photography; is Icelandic–Danish, considered one of the most famous Icelandic artists, in Iceland written Ólafur Elíasson
- Michael Elmgreen (1961–), installations
- Lisa Engqvist (1914–1989), ceramist
- Gutte Eriksen (1918–2008), ceramist
- Adam Fischer (1888–1968), sculptor
- Wilhelm Freddie (1909–1995), painter
- Ingeborg Frederiksen (1886–1976), painter and botanical illustrator
- Andreas Friis (1890–1983), painter
- Hermann Ernst Freund (1786–1840), sculptor
- Paul Gadegaard (1920–1996), painter and sculptor
- Ib Geertsen (1919–2009), painter and sculptor
- Albert Gottschalk (1866–1906), painter
- Hans Jørgen Hammer (1815–1882), painter
- Svend Hammershøi (1873–1948), painter and ceramist
- Vilhelm Hammershøi (1864–1916), painter
- Karen Hannover (1872–1943), ceramist
- Aksel Hansen (1853–1933), sculptor
- Constantin Hansen (1804–1880), painter
- Heinrich Hansen (1821–1890), painter
- Johannes Hansen (1903–1995), sculptor
- Peter Hansen (1868–1928), painter
- Karl Hansen Reistrup (1863–1929), sculptor, ceramist, illustrator
- Arne Haugen Sørensen (1932–), painter, illustrator and church decorator
- Jørgen Haugen Sørensen (1934–2021), sculptor
- Sven Havsteen-Mikkelsen (1912–1999), painter, illustrator and church decorator
- Henry Heerup (1907–1993), painter
- Einar Hein (1875–1931), painter
- Jeppe Hein (1974–), installations
- Gerhard Henning (1880–1967), sculptor
- Frants Henningsen (1850–1908), artist
- Jacob Holdt (1947–), photographer, writer
- Hans Holst (born before 1619, died after 1640), woodcarver
- Johannes Holt-Iversen (1989–), painter
- Paul Høm (1905–1994), artist and church decorator
- Horder (12th century), stonemason and sculptor
- Knud Hvidberg (1927–1986), painter and sculptor
- Peter Ilsted (1861–1933), painter/etcher
- Valdemar Irminger (1850–1938), painter
- Robert Jacobsen (1912–1993), sculptor and painter
- Ville Jais-Nielsen (1886–1949), painter
- Axel P. Jensen (1885–1972), painter
- Johan Laurentz Jensen (1800–1856), painter
- Jens Adolf Jerichau (1818–1883), sculptor
- Svend Johansen (1890–1970), painter, scenographer
- Viggo Johansen (1851–1935), painter
- Lorentz Jørgensen (1644–1681), woodcarver
- Asger Jorn (1914–1973), painter
- Jens Juel (1745–1802), painter mainly known for portraits
- Bodil Kaalund (1930–2016), painter, textile artist, church decorator
- Herman A. Kähler (1846–1917), ceramist
- Per Kirkeby (1938–2018), painter
- Anna Klindt Sørensen (1899–1985), painter
- Jesper Knudsen (1964–), painter
- Eva Koch (1953–), sculptor
- Kristiane Konstantin-Hansen (1848–1925), textile artist
- John Kørner (1967–), painter
- Theodora Krarup (1862–1941), portrait painter
- Nathalie Krebs (1895–1978), potter
- Pietro Krohn (1840–1905), painter, illustrator
- Peder Severin Krøyer (1851–1909), painter
- Christen Købke (1810–1848), painter
- Michael Kvium (1955–), painter
- La Norma Fox (1926–2026), trapeze artist
- Poul Lange (1956–) graphic designer, artist, photographer
- Alhed Larsen (1872–1927), painter
- Emanuel Larsen (1823–1859), painter
- Johannes Larsen (1867–1961), painter
- Harald Leth (1899–1986), painter
- Kirsten Lockenwitz (1932–2025), painter and sculptor
- Christian August Lorentzen (1749–1828), painter
- Frederik Christian Lund (1826–1901), painter
- Vilhelm Lundstrøm (1893–1950), painter
- Julie Lütken (1788–1816), painter
- Christine Løvmand (1803–1872), painter
- Jais Nielsen (1885–1961), painter and ceramist
- Karl Madsen (1855–1938), painter and art historian
- Wilhelm Marstrand (1810–1873), painter
- Brix Michgell (early 17th century), sculptor, woodworker
- Mogens Møller (1934–2021), painter and sculptor
- Moritz Georg Moshack (1730–before 1772), clavichord builder
- Richard Mortensen (1910–1993), painter
- Adam August Müller (1811–1844), painter
- Christian Mølsted (1862–1930), painter
- Rasmus Nellemann (1923–2004), painter and illustrator
- Knud Nellemose (1908–1997), sculptor
- Anders Nielsen Hatt (early 17th century), sculptor, woodworker
- Elsa Nielsen (1923–2011), graphic artist
- Kai Nielsen (1882–1924), sculptor
- Palle Nielsen (1923–2000), graphic artist
- Thorvald Niss (1842–1905), painter
- Astrid Noack (1888–1954), sculptor
- Emil Normann (1798–1881)
- Dagmar Olrik (1860–1932), painter and tapestry artist
- John Olsen (1938–2019), painter, sculptor
- Willy Ørskov (1920–1990), sculptor
- Erik Ortvad (1917–2008), painter
- Carl-Henning Pedersen, painter
- Axel Poulsen (1887–1972), sculptor
- Tal R (1967–), painter
- Anu Ramdas (1980–), interdisciplinary artist
- Svend Rathsack (1885–1941), sculptor
- Jytte Rex (1942–), painter, writer, filmmaker
- Jørgen Ringnis (?–1652), woodcarver
- Elof Risebye (1892–1961), painter, church decorator
- Martinus Rørbye (1803–1848), painter
- Arild Rosenkrantz (1870–1964), painter, stained glass artist, sculptor and illustrator
- William Scharff (1886–1959), painter
- Abel Schrøder the Younger (1602–1676), woodcarver
- Hans Smidth (1839–1917), painter
- Povl Søndergaard (1905–1986), sculptor
- Karen Strand (1924–2000), goldsmith
- Jakob Martin Strid (1972–), cartoonist
- Kamma Svensson (1908–1998), illustrator
- Christine Swane (1876–1960), painter
- Sigurd Swane (1879–1973), painter
- Anna Syberg (1870–1914), painter
- Fritz Syberg (1862–1939), painter and illustrator
- Carl Frederik Sørensen (1818–1879)
- Carl Thomsen (1847–1912), painter and illustrator
- Bertel Thorvaldsen (1770–1844), sculptor
- Jette Thyssen (born 1933), textile artist
- Elisabeth Toubro (1956–), sculptor
- Kurt Trampedach (1943–2013), painter
- Paula Trock (1889–1979), weaver, textile artist
- Lise Warburg (born 1932), textile artist and writer
- Gunnar Westman (1915–1985), sculptor
- Svend Wiig Hansen (1922–1997), sculptor and painter
- Johannes Wiedewelt (1731–1802), sculptor
- Thomas Winkler (1953–), clothing designer, writer and visual multi-artist; house artist for the Tivoli Gardens
- Christian Zacho (1843–1913), painter

== Business people ==
- Birgit Aagard-Svendsen (1956–), CFO of J. Lauritzen
- Laura Aller (1849–1917), editor and pioneering magazine publisher at Aller
- Hans Niels Andersen (1852–1937), founder of the East Asiatic Company
- Dagmar Andreasen (1920–2006), ran the Rynkeby juice factory from 1953 to 1986
- Irene Benneweis (1891–1970), circus director
- Lilly Brændgaard (1918–2009), fashion designer specializing in wedding dresses
- Bianca Bruhn (born 1975), technology-focused business executive, from 2022 director of Google Denmark
- Constantin Brun (1746–1836), merchant, royal administrator of trade on the Danish West Indies
- Elsebeth Budolfsen (1947–), pharmacist and business executive
- Ole Kirk Christiansen (1891–1958), inventor of Lego
- Johan Frederik Classen (1725–1792), statesman and industrialist, founder of Frederiksværk
- Peter Hersleb Classen (1738–1825), statesman and financial administrator
- Mads Clausen (1905–1966), founder of Danfoss Industries
- Henriette Danneskiold-Samsøe (1776–1843), founder of the Holmegaard Glass Factory
- Janus Friis (1976–), Skype, Kazaa, Joost and minor companies
- Ole Henriksen (1951–), cosmetologist for Hollywood stars
- Søren Hjorth (1801–1870), inventor
- Henning Holck-Larsen (1907–2003) and Søren Kristian Toubro (1906–1982), founders of Indian engineering firm Larsen & Toubro
- J. C. Jacobsen (1811–1887), founder of Carlsberg Brewing
- Hanni Toosbuy Kasprzak (1957–), owner of the ECCO shoe company
- William S. Knudsen (1879–1948), industrialist; president, General Motors in the US
- Camilla Ley Valentin (1973–), entrepreneur and co-founder of Queue-it
- Martin Lindstrom (1970–), marketing advisor
- Arnold Peter Møller (1876–1965), founder of A.P. Møller-Mærsk Group, the largest Danish company
- Mærsk Mc-Kinney Møller (1913–2012), shipping magnate
- Nikoline Nielsen (1874–1951), brewer
- Inger Marie Plum (1889–1965), early businesswoman in butter and canned meat production
- Jørgen Skafte Rasmussen (1878–1964)
- Kevin Bendix (1968–) temporary urban culture developer
- Tine Susanne Miksch Roed (1964–), deputy director-general, Confederation of Danish Industry
- Frida Schou (1891–1980), early businesswoman and brick manufacturer
- Rasmus Sigvardt (1886–), engine manufacturer
- Nina Smith (born 1955), economist and university professor
- Carl Frederik Tietgen (1829–1901), financier and industrialist; co-founder of many large Danish companies
- Ane Mærsk Mc-Kinney Uggla (1948–), business executive, chair of the A.P. Møller Foundation
- Lillian von Kauffmann (1920–2016), businesswoman and property owner

== Chefs and restaurateurs ==
- Sven and Lene Grønlykke (1927–1998, 1933–1990)
- Rasmus Kofoed (1974–)
- Claus Meyer (1963–)
- Michel Michaud (1946–), brought French cuisine to Denmark in 1971
- René Redzepi (1977–), chef, co-founder of Noma restaurant
- Lertchai Treetawatchaiwong (1978–)
- Karen Volf (1864–1946), pioneering female baker and pastry cook

== Comedians ==
- Anders Bircow (1951–), comedian, musician
- Rasmus Bjerg (1976–), comedian
- Victor Borge (1909–2000), comedian, musician
- Casper Christensen (1968–), comedian
- Drengene fra Angora, comedy trio
- Thomas Eje (1957–), comedian, musician, touring in U.S. as Tom Dane
- Jan Gintberg (1963–), comedian
- Lars Hjortshøj (1967–), comedian
- Ane Høgsberg (born 1988), stand-up comedian
- Frank Hvam (1970–), comedian
- Rune Klan (born 1976), comedian
- Simon Kvamm (1975–), comedian, musician
- Morten Lindberg (1965–2019), comedian also known as "Master Fatman"
- Anders Matthesen (1975–), comedian
- De Nattergale, comedy music trio
- Lasse Rimmer (1972–), comedian
- Sanne Søndergaard (born 1980), stand-up comedian and writer
- Sandi Toksvig (1958–), comedian in the UK
- Mads Vangsø (1971–), comedian

== Criminals ==
- Peter Adler Alberti, abuse of power as Minister of Justice by impeachment and embezzlement
- Stein Bagger, the IT Factory Fraud Case
- The Blekinge Street Gang, robbery, financial aid to PFLP
- Peter Brixtofte, abuse of power as Mayor of Farum
- Niels Holck, involved in illegal weapons supply in India
- Peter Lundin, four cases of murder
- Peter Langkjær Madsen, murder of journalist
- Erik Ninn-Hansen, abuse of power as Minister of Justice by impeachment
- Palle Sørensen, murder of four police officers

== Dancers ==
- Frank Andersen (1953–), Royal Danish Ballet: ballet dancer and ballet master
- Mads Blangstrup (1974–), principal dancer, Royal Danish Ballet
- August Bournonville (1805–1879), ballet dancer and choreographer
- Gudrun Bojesen (1976–), principal dancer, Royal Danish Ballet
- Dinna Bjørn (1947–), principal dancer, ballet mistress, Royal Danish Ballet
- Marie Christine Bjørn (1763–1837), outstanding ballerina, Royal Danish Theatre
- Ida Brun (1792–1857), dancer, mime artist, singer
- Erik Bruhn (1929–1986), ballet dancer
- Lise la Cour (1944–2016), ballet dancer and choreographer
- Camilla Dallerup (1974–), British-based Danish ballroom dancer
- Vivi Flindt (1943–), choreographer, Royal Danish Ballet
- Anine Frölich (1762–1784), ballet dancer
- Adeline Genée (1878–1970), ballerina, Royal Danish Ballet; later music hall roles in London, New York and Sydney
- Lucile Grahn (1819–1907), ballerina, Royal Danish Ballet, performed widely across Europe
- Susanne Grinder (1981–), principal dancer, Royal Danish Ballet
- Eline Heger (1774–1842), ballet dancer, Royal Danish Ballet
- Else Højgaard (1906–1979), ballerina, stage and film actress, Royal Danish Theatre
- Mette Hønningen (1944–), ballerina, Royal Danish Ballet
- Nikolaj Hubbe (1967–), Royal Danish Ballet balletmaster and former New York City Ballet principal dancer
- Palle Jacobsen (1940–2009), ballet dancer and ballet master
- Caroline Kellermann (1821–1881), solo dancer in the Royal Danish Ballet
- Andrea Krætzmer (1811–1889), soloist in August Bournonville's early ballets
- Henning Kronstam (1934–1995), dancer, balletmaster, theatre director, Royal Danish Ballet
- Margot Lander (1910–1961), Denmark's first prima ballerina, Royal Danish Ballet
- Toni Lander (1931–1985), ballerina in Copenhagen, Paris, London and Salt Lake City
- Elna Lassen (1901–1930), ballerina, Royal Danish Ballet
- Gitte Lindstrøm (1975–), principal dancer, Royal Danish Ballet
- Nilas Martins, New York City Ballet principal dancer
- Peter Martins (1946–), New York City Ballet balletmaster in chief, choreographer and former ballet dancer
- Asta Mollerup (1881–1945), modern dance teacher and school director
- Augusta Nielsen (1822–1902), ballerina, soloist in Bournonville's ballets
- Elna Ørnberg (1880–1969), ballerina, soloist in Bournonville's ballets
- Ulla Poulsen (1905–2001), ballerina, Royal Danish Ballet
- Ellen Price (1878–1968), prima ballerina, Royal Danish Ballet
- Juliette Price (1831–1906), prima ballerina, Royal Danish Ballet, worked with Bournonville
- Kirsten Ralov (1922–1999), ballerina, ballet mistress, associate director, Royal Danish Ballet
- Louise Rasmussen (1815–1874), ballet dancer and stage actor, Royal Danish Ballet
- Margrethe Schall (1775–1852), ballerina, Royal Danish Ballet
- Silja Schandorff (1969–), ballerina, Royal Danish Ballet
- Kirsten Simone (1934–2024), first soloist Royal Danish Ballet
- Nini Theilade (1915–2018), ballet dancer, choreographer, film star
- Anna Tychsen (1863–1896), ballet dancer
- Valda Valkyrien (1895–1956), prima ballerina, Royal Danish Ballet, silent film actress in the United

== Economists ==
- Tim Bollerslev (1958–), economist and professor at American institutions
- Ernst Immanuel Cohen Brandes (1844–1892), economist and editor
- Johan Christian Fabricius (1745–1808), economist and entomologist
- Bodil Nyboe Andersen (1940–2025), governor of the Danish National Bank from 1995 to 2005
- Bo Honoré (1960–), economist and professor at Princeton University
- Lasse Heje Pedersen (1972–), financial economist and professor at Copenhagen Business School

== Explorers ==
- Vitus Bering (1680–1741)
- Hans Egede (1686–1758)
- Carl Gunnar Feilberg (1894–1972), Iran
- Peter Freuchen (1886–1957), Greenland
- Thomas Vilhelm Garde (1859–1926), Greenland
- Wilhelm August Graah (1793–1863), Greenland
- Henning Haslund-Christensen (1896–1948), Mongolia
- Gustav Frederik Holm (1849–1940), Greenland
- Erik Holtved (1899–1981)
- Carl Krebs (1889–1971), Central Asia
- Jochem Pietersen Kuyter (?–1654), seaman and early settler of New Netherland
- Godske Lindenov (?–1612), Greenland
- Conrad Malte-Brun (1755–1826), Danish-born French geographer
- Ejnar Mikkelsen (1880–1971), Greenland
- Harald Moltke (1871–1960), Greenland
- Jens Munk (1579–1628)
- Ludvig Mylius-Erichsen (1872–1907), Greenland
- Ole Olufsen (1865–1929), Central Asia
- Didrik Pining (c. 1428–1491), Greenland
- Hans Pothorst (c. 1440–c. 1490), Greenland
- Knud Rasmussen (1879–1933), the Arctic
- Barclay Raunkiær (1889–1915), Arabia
- Carl Ryder (1858–1923), Greenland
- Peder Olsen Walløe (1716–1793), Greenland

== Fictional Danes ==
- Dan I of Denmark, mythological first king of Denmark
- Frotho I, mythological king of Denmark (King Frodo I, see Fróði)
- Frotho II, mythological king of Denmark (King Frodo II, see Fróði)
- Dani Beck
- Beowulf
- King Claudius
- Holger Danske
- Gertrude
- King Hamlet
- Prince Hamlet
- Hans (Disney)
- The Little Mermaid
- Skærmtrolden Hugo
- Thumbelina
- Ragnar Lothbrok
- Egon Olsen

== Film directors ==
- Bille August (1948–), director
- Erik Balling (1924–2005), director
- Susanne Bier (1960–), director, writer
- August Blom (1869–1947), director, producer
- Ole Bornedal (1959–), director
- Carl Theodor Dreyer (1889–1968), film director (The Passion of Joan of Arc, Ordet)
- Peter Elfelt (1866–1931), photographer, silent film director
- Per Fly (1960–)
- Bodil Ipsen (1889–1964), director, actress
- Anders Thomas Jensen (1972–)
- Lau Lauritzen Jr. (1910–1977), director, actor, producer
- Jørgen Leth (1937–2025), filmmaker and poet
- Nils Malmros (1944–), filmmaker
- Nicolas Winding Refn (1970–), director
- Mikael Salomon (1945–), director, writer
- Lone Scherfig (1959–), director
- Lars von Trier (1956–), director
- Thomas Vinterberg (1969–), director

== Gamers ==
- Søren Bjerg (1996–), League of Legends gamer for Team SoloMid
- Rasmus Winther (1999–), League of Legends gamer for G2 Esports, widely regarded as the best western player of all time
- Henrik Hansen (1994–), League of Legends gamer
- Nicolaj Jensen (1995–), League of Legends gamer for Cloud9
- Dennis Johnsen (1996–), League of Legends gamer for Cloud9
- Lucas Tao Kilmer Larsen (1997–), League of Legends gamer
- Chres Laursen (1998–), League of Legends gamer for Misfits Gaming
- Jesper Svenningsen (1997–), League of Legends gamer for Team SoloMid
- Nicolai Hvilshøj Reedtz (1995–), Counter Strike: Global Offensive gamer for Astralis
- Lukas Egholm Rossander (1995–), Counter Strike: Global Offensive gamer for Astralis
- Peter Rothmann Rasmussen (1993–), Counter Strike: Global Offensive gamer for Astralis
- Andreas Højsleth (1995–), Counter Strike: Global Offensive gamer for Astralis
- Emil Hoffmann Reif (1998–), Counter Strike: Global Offensive gamer for Astralis
- Johan Sundstein (1993–), Dota 2 gamer for OG, highest earning Esports player by pricepool

== Historians ==
- Sven Aggesen (fl. 12th century), historian
- Ellen Andersen (1898–1989), museum curator, specializing in the history of textiles
- Kirsti Andersen (1941–), historian of mathematics
- Erik Arup (1876–1951), historian
- Tom Buk-Swienty (1966–), historian with a focus on the Second Schleswig War
- Tove Clemmensen (1915–2006), art historian and curator
- A. G. Drachmann (1891–1980), historian
- Kristian Erslev (1852–1930), historian and Historiographer
- Saxo Grammaticus (c. 1160–c. 1220), historian
- Ingeborg Hammer-Jensen (1880–1955), classical philologist and historian of alchemy
- Karin Hindsbo (1974–), art historian
- Anna Hude (1858–1934), first Danish woman to graduate as a historian
- Arild Huitfeldt (1546–1609), historian
- Adolf Ditlev Jørgensen (1840–1897), historian
- Maria Nielsen (1882–1931), historian and headmistress
- Louise Nyholm Kallestrup (1975–), historian with a focus on early modern history
- Bo Lidegaard (1958–), historian
- Troels Frederik Lund (1840–1921), historian
- Astrid Friis (1893–1966), historian focusing on 17th-century trade and commerce
- Elisabeth Munksgaard (1924–1997), historian and expert on art from the late Iron Age and Viking Age
- Niels Neergaard (1854–1936), historian
- Elise Otté (1818–1903), historian and linguist
- Else Roesdahl (1942–), historian and Viking specialist
- Bente Scavenius (1944–), art historian
- Else Kai Sass (1912–1987), art historian
- Peter Frederik Suhm (1728–1798), historian
- Per K. Sørensen (1950–), Tibetologist
- Stephanius (1599–1650), historian
- Anders Sørensen Vedel (1542–1616), historian
- Jens Jacob Asmussen Worsaae (1821–1885), archaeologist, historian and pioneer in paleobotany

== Linguists ==
- Ada Adler (1878–1946)
- Una Canger (born 1938), linguist
- Christian Falster (1690–1752), poet and philologist
- Louis Hjelmslev (1899–1955)
- Eli Fischer-Jørgensen (1911–2010), phonetician
- Frede Jensen (1926–2008), philologist and professor
- Otto Jespersen (1860–1943)
- Johan Nicolai Madvig (1804–1886)
- Axel Olrik (1864–1917)
- Holger Pedersen (1867–1953), linguist
- Rasmus Rask (1787–1832), linguist
- Jørgen Rischel (1934–2007), linguist
- Kim Ryholt (born 1970), philologist and egyptologist
- Vilhelm Thomsen (1842–1927)
- Karl Verner (1846–1896), linguist

== Models ==
- Nina Agdal, model
- Heidi Albertsen, model
- May Andersen, model
- Anine Bing, model
- Oliver Bjerrehuus, model
- Helena Christensen, model
- Kira Eggers, adult model
- Freja Beha Erichsen, model
- Majken Haugedal, model
- Katja K, pornstar
- Mathias Lauridsen, model
- Renée Simonsen, model
- Josephine Skriver, model
- Tania Strecker, model
- Catharina Svensson, model, Miss Earth 2001
- Cecilie Thomsen, model, appeared in Tomorrow Never Dies
- Victoria Kjær Theilvig, model, Miss Universe 2024

== Music ==
=== A ===
- Afenginn
- Alphabeat
- Anti Social Media
- Aqua, peaked in 1997 with "Barbie Girl"
- Artillery
- Signe Asmussen (1970–), mezzo-soprano
- Christina Åstrand (1969–), violinist, leader of the Danish National Symphony Orchestra

=== B ===
- Lisbeth Balslev, operatic soprano
- Basim
- Ellen Beck (1873–1953), soprano concert singer
- Bamses Venner
- Ben and Tan
- Julie Berthelsen, singer
- Bikstok Røgsystem
- Birmingham 6
- The Blue Van
- Helene Blum (1979–), folk singer and musician
- Katy Bødtger
- Henriette Bonde-Hansen (1963–), operatic soprano
- Dagmar Borup (1867–1959), pianist and educator
- Brixx
- Gunna Breuning-Storm (1891–1966), violinist, educator
- Niels Brinck
- Birgit Brüel
- Gerda von Bülow (1904–1990), violinist, educator
- Dieterich Buxtehude (1637–1707), composer

=== C ===
- C21
- Debbie Cameron
- Dario Campeotto
- Carpark North
- The Cartoons
- Christina Chanée
- Tim Christensen
- Ida Corr

=== D ===
- D-A-D
- Anna David
- Daze
- Emmelie de Forest, winner of Eurovision Song Contest 2013
- Lonnie Devantier
- Tina Dickow, singer
- Tina Dico
- René Dif, singer, member of Aqua
- Dizzy Mizz Lizzy
- DJ Encore
- Dominus
- Elisabeth Dons (1864–1942), opera singer
- DQ

=== E ===
- Efterklang
- Amir El-Falaki
- Michael Elo, composer
- Evil Masquerade

=== F ===
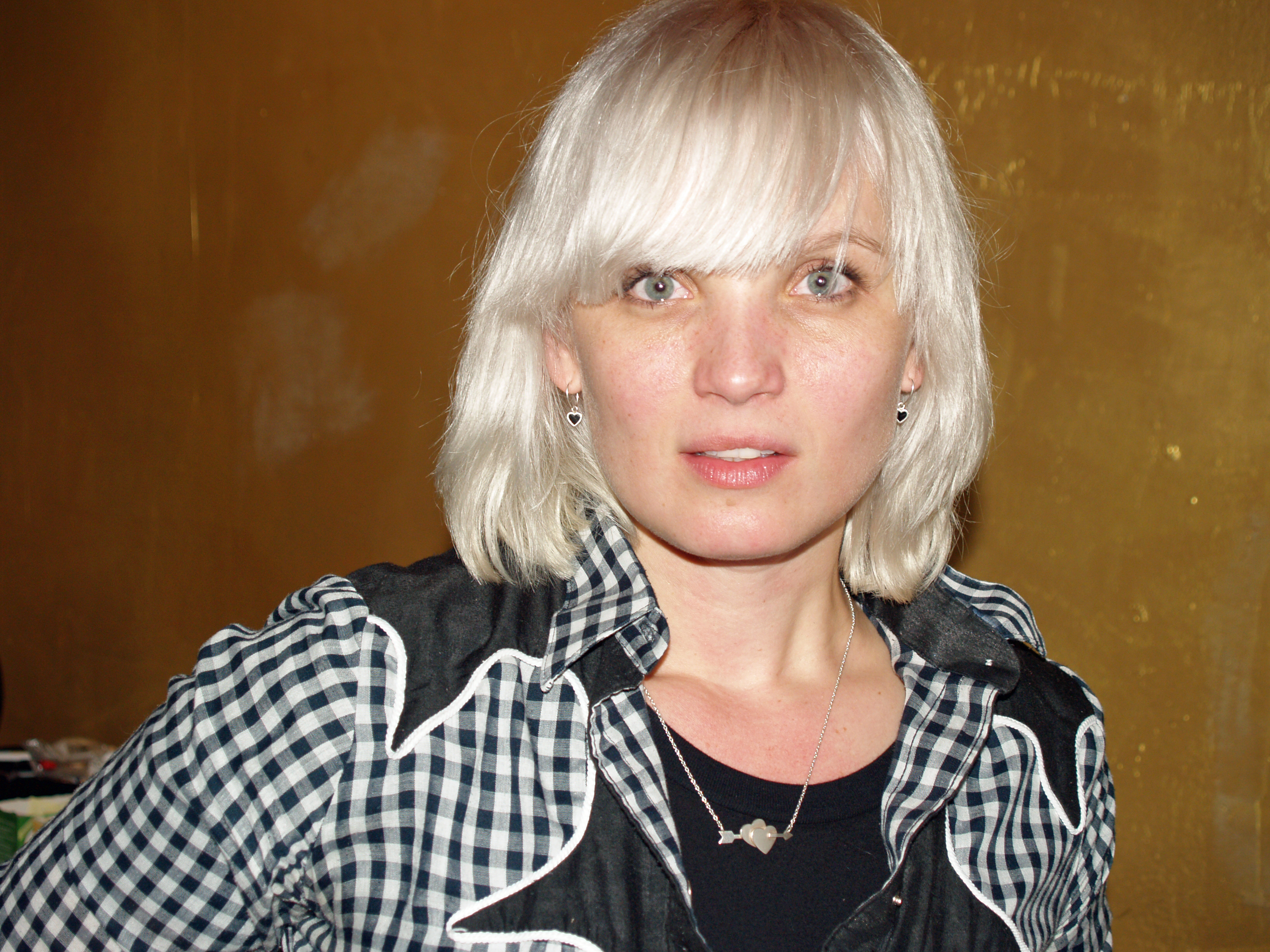
Sharin Foo of The Raveonettes

- Bent Fabricius-Bjerre
- Fate
- Fielfraz
- Figurines
- Sharin Foo
- Anders Frandsen
- Lars Frederiksen, vocalist of Rancid
- A Friend in London
- Fyr og Flamme

=== G ===
- Jacob Gade
- Niels W. Gade
- Gangway
- Gasolin'
- Susanne Georgi, one half of Me & My
- Leocadie Gerlach (1826–1919), Danish-Swedish opera singer
- Lukas Graham
- Peder Gram (1881–1956), composer
- Edith Guillaume (1943–2013), mezzo-soprano opera singer

=== H ===
- Lise Haavik
- Golla Hammerich (1854–1903), pianist
- Lars Hannibal (1951–), guitarist and lutenist
- Hatesphere
- Caroline Henderson
- Hit'n'Hide
- Horrorpops
- Hot Eyes
- Hurdy Gurdy
- Húsakórið, Faroese/Danish

=== I ===
- Illdisposed
- Infernal
- Grethe Ingmann
- Jørgen Ingmann

=== J ===
- Louise Janssen (1863–1938), opera singer
- Knud Jeppesen (1892–1974)
- Trine Jepsen
- Gry Johansen
- Jokeren
- Junior Senior

=== K ===
- Kashmir
- Sophie Keller (1850–1929), opera singer
- King Diamond (1956–)
- Birthe Kjær
- Kliché
- Klutæ
- Kølig Kaj

=== L ===
- Laban
- Laid Back
- Kim Larsen (1945–2018)
- Jeppe Laursen
- Lazyboy
- Margrethe Lendrop (1873–1920), opera singer
- Leonora
- Rasmus Lerdorf
- Leæther Strip
- Lighthouse X
- Anne Linnet
- Hans Christian Lumbye

=== M ===
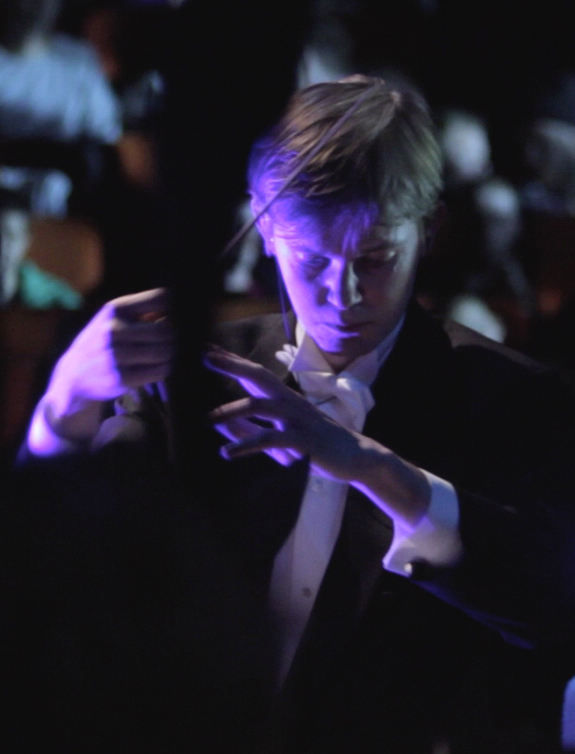
Frederik Magle

- Mabel
- Frederik Magle
- Malk de Koijn
- Manticora
- Mames Babegenush
- Simon Mathew
- MC Einar, rap band
- Me & My
- Medina
- Mercenary
- Mercyful Fate
- Mew
- Michael Learns to Rock
- Ulla Miilmann (1972–), flautist
- Christine Milton
- Anila Mirza (1974–), singer
- MØ (1988–), pop singer
- Ida Møller (1872–1947), opera singer
- Miss Papaya
- Mnemic
- Mofus
- John Mogensen
- Malene Mortensen

=== N ===
- The Naked
- Nanna
- Natasja Saad
- Nekromantix
- Nephew
- Tomas N'evergreen
- New Politics
- Amanda Nielsen (1866–1953), cabaret singer
- Carl Nielsen (1865–1931), composer
- Inga Nielsen (1946–2008), soprano
- Ida Nielsen (Prince), bassist
- Nik og Jay
- Anja Nissen
- Eva Noer Kondrup (1964–), composer
- Claus Norreen, composer
- Rasmus Nøhr
- Per Nørgård

=== O ===
- Edith Oldrup, opera singer
- Oh No Ono
- Olsen Brothers
- Outlandish
- Aage Oxenvad (1884–1944), clarinetist

=== P ===
- Else Paaske (1941–), mezzo-soprano concert singer
- Niels-Henning Ørsted Pedersen, jazz bass player
- Michala Petri (1958–), recorder player
- Ulla Pia
- Pretty Maids
- Psyched Up Janis
- Pyramaze

=== R ===
- Lina Rafn
- Wilhelm Ramsøe (1837–1895), composer
- Rasmussen
- Søren Nystrøm Rasted, composer
- Raquel Rastenni
- Raunchy
- The Raveonettes
- Simon Ravn, film composer
- Reddi
- Reiley
- Remee, composer
- Bryan Rice
- Ridin' Thumb
- Rollo & King
- Rune RK

=== S ===
- Saba
- Safri Duo
- Soluna Samay
- Louise Sahlgreen (1818–1891), opera singer
- Sanne Salomonsen
- Savage Rose
- Saybia
- Sebastian
- Rasmus Seebach
- Tommy Seebach
- Sidsel Ben Semmane
- Shu-Bi-Dua
- Catharine Simonsen (1816–1849), opera singer
- Sissal
- S.O.A.P.
- Sort Sol
- Spleen United
- Simon Steen-Andersen, composer
- Johanne Stockmarr (1869–1944), classical pianist
- Superheroes
- Jakob Sveistrup
- Bent Sørensen

=== T ===
- Tomas Thordarson
- Bjørn Tidmand
- Tiggy
- Jette Torp
- Søren Torpegaard Lund
- Toy-Box
- Mike Tramp (1961–), singer in White Lion
- Trentemøller
- Trille (1945–2016), singer-songwriter
- Thomas Troelsen
- TV-2

=== U ===
- Lars Ulrich (1963–), drummer in Metallica
- Under byen

=== V ===
- Esther Vagning (1905–1986), classical concert pianist
- Volbeat (band)
- Vola (progressive rock band)

=== W ===
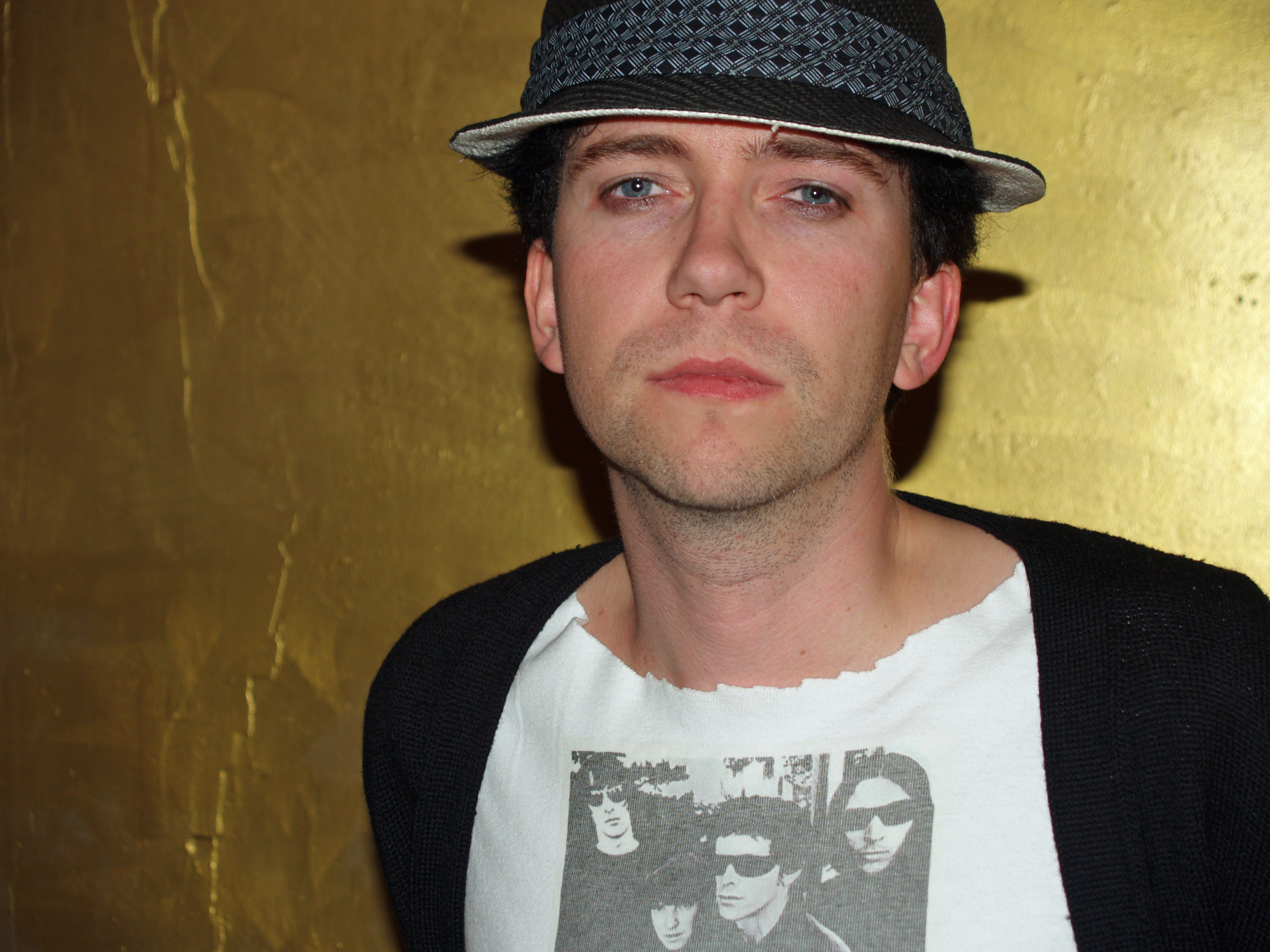
Sune Rose Wagner of The Raveonettes

- Sune Rose Wagner
- Galina Werschenska (1906–1994), Russian-born Danish pianist
- Christopher Ernst Friedrich Weyse
- Whigfield
- Birthe Wilke
- Aud Wilken
- Gustav Winckler
- Ellen Winther
- Lars Winther

=== Z ===
- Josephine Zinck (1829–1919), concert and opera singer

== Philanthropists ==
- Mimi Carstensen (1852–1935), philanthropist and journalist
- Valborg Hammerich (1897–1988), resistance member and founder of "Red Barnet"
- Kirsten Lauritzen (1902–1980), helped needy children and the elderly
- Camilla Nielsen (1856–1932), philanthropist and politician
- Julie Ramsing (1871–1954), organized trips to Denmark for malnourished German children
- Lucie Marie Reventlow (1884–1894), philanthropist, supporter of the scouting movement

== Philosophers ==
- N. F. S. Grundtvig (1783–1872), educationalist, philosopher and social reformer
- Harald Høffding (1843–1931)
- Søren Kierkegaard (1813–1855), philosopher
- Knud Ejler Løgstrup (1905–1981), Christian philosopher
- Rasmus Nielsen (1809–1884)
- Johannes Sløk (1916–2001), Christian philosopher and translator of Shakespeare
- Martinus Thomsen (1890–1981), referred to as Martinus, writer and mystic

== Photographers ==
- Mads Alstrup (1808–1876), first Danish photographer with own studio
- Per Bak Jensen (1949–), influential photographer with an innovative artistic landscape style
- Morten Bo (1945–), influential photographer, author of many photo books
- Pietro Boyesen (1819–1882), photographer in Rome
- Krass Clement (1946–), specializing in the photo-essay style
- Peter Faber (1810–1877), took oldest photo on record
- Frederikke Federspiel (1839–1913), first female photographer to practice in Denmark
- Kristen Feilberg (1839–1919), remembered for many early photographs in Dutch East Indies
- Jens Fink-Jensen (1956–), contemporary artistic photographer
- Jan Grarup (1968–), award-winning press photographer specializing in war and conflict
- Ludvig Grundtvig (1836–1901), photographer and portrait painter
- Caroline Hammer (1832–1915), early woman photographer with a studio on the Frisian island of Föhr
- Georg Emil Hansen (1833–1891), pioneering court photographer
- Christian Hedemann (1852–1932), remembered for his early photographs of Hawaii
- Keld Helmer-Petersen (1920–2013), pioneer in colour photography in the 1940s
- Jacob Holdt (1947–), used photography to encourage social reform
- Jesper Høm (1931–2000), influential press photographer and film director
- Kirsten Klein (1945–), specializing in black-and-white landscapes
- Astrid Kruse Jensen (1975–), specializing in night photography with an unreal dimension
- Claus Bjørn Larsen (1963–), award-winning press photographer
- Anton Melbye (1818–1875), artist using photography as an aid to painting
- Israel B. Melchior (1827–1893), amateur photographer who photographed Hans Christian Andersen
- Rigmor Mydtskov (1925–2010), theatre photography and court photographer for Queen Margrethe
- Viggo Rivad (1922–2016), used photographic essays to portray ordinary citizens
- Leif Schiller (1939–2007), photographer
- Lars Schwander (1957–), portraits of international artists
- Jacob Aue Sobol (1976–), award-winning collections from Greenland, Guatemala and Tokyo
- Mary Steen (1856–1939), pioneer of indoor photography, including royalty
- Rudolph Striegler (1816–1876), pioneering portrait photography
- Heinrich Tønnies (1825–1903), early studio in Aalborg, portraits and landscapes
- Sigvart Werner (1872–1959), amateur who gained fame from Danish landscapes in book form
- Mary Willumsen (1884–1961), sold postcards of scantily-dressed women from 1916
- Benedicte Wrensted (1859–1949), took photographs of Native Americans in Idaho

== Politicians ==
- Frank Aaen (born 1951), politician (Enhedslisten)
- Yildiz Akdogan (born 1973), politician (Social Democrats)
- Ragnhild Andersen (1907–1990), politician and trade unionist (Communist Party)
- Karen Ankersted (1859–1921), pioneering female politician (Conservative People's Party)
- Svend Auken (1943–2009), politician (Social Democrats)
- Bendt Bendtsen (born 1954), politician (Konservative Folkeparti)
- Gudrun Bjørner (1898–1959), politician (Justice Party)
- Klaus Bondam (born 1963), politician, actor (Det Radikale Venstre)
- Vilhelm Buhl (1881–1954), politician, Danish prime minister 1942 & 1945 (Social Democrats)
- Kirsten Marie Christensen (1860–1935), one of the first five women to be elected to the Landsting in 1918
- Henriette Crone (1874–1933), Landsting politician, trade unionist, peace activist
- Kristian Thulesen Dahl (born 1969), politician (Dansk Folkeparti)
- Karen Dahlerup (1920–2018), politician (Social Democrats)
- Marie Egeberg (1865–1952), schoolteacher, women's rights activist and Ventre politician
- Erik Eriksen (1902–1972)
- Lene Espersen (born 1965), politician (Konservative Folkeparti)
- Jacob Brønnum Scavenius Estrup (1825–1913), Council President
- Mette Frederiksen(born 1977), politician (Social Democrats)
- Louise Frevert (born 1953), politician (no political party)
- Lis Groes (1910–1974), politician (Social Democrats) and feminist
- Mette Groes (1937–2014), politician (Social Democrats)
- Hans Christian Hansen (1906–1960)
- Litten Hansen (born 1944), actress, activist and politician (Left Socialists)
- Hans Hedtoft (1903–1955)
- Lisbet Hindsgaul (1890–1969), politician (Conservative People's Party) and women's rights activist
- Frode Jakobsen (1906–1997), WWII in the resistance movement, member of the Danish Freedom Council, politician (Social Democrats)
- Marianne Jelved (born 1943), politician (Det Radikale Venstre)
- Frank Jensen (born 1961), politician (Social Democrats), Lord Mayor of Copenhagen
- Anker Jørgensen (1922–2016), politician, Danish prime minister 1972–1973 & 1975–1982 (Social Democrats)
- Viggo Kampmann (1910–1976)
- Naser Khader (born 1963), politician (Konservative Folkeparti)
- Pia Kjærsgaard (born 1947), politician (Dansk Folkeparti)
- Jens Otto Krag (1914–1978), former prime minister
- Knud Kristensen (1880–1962)
- Edele Kruchow (1915–1989), member of the Folketing, served on Denmark's delegation to the United Nations
- Camma Larsen-Ledet (1915–1991), politician, minister and mayor (Social Democrats)
- Helga Larsen (1884–1947), one of the first four women to be elected to the Folketing
- Mogens Lykketoft (born 1946), politician (Social Democrats)
- Eva Madsen (1884–1972), Denmark's first female mayor
- Brian Mikkelsen (born 1966), politician (Konservative Folkeparti)
- Per Stig Møller (born 1942), politician (Konservative Folkeparti)
- Poul Møller (1919–1997), politician, minister of Finance 1968–1971, member of the European Parliament 1979–1986 (Konservative Folkeparti)
- Holger K. Nielsen (born 1950), politician (Socialistisk Folkeparti)
- Marichen Nielsen (1921–2014), politician (Social Democrats)
- Elisa Petersen (1876–1932), early female politician (Venstre) and women's rights activist
- Petra Petersen (1901–1989), politician and resistance fighter
- Søren Pape Poulsen (1971–2024), politician (Konservative Folkeparti)
- Anders Fogh Rasmussen (born 1953), Danish prime minister 2001–2009 (Venstre)
- Lars Løkke Rasmussen (born 1964), politician, Danish prime minister 2009–2011 (Venstre)
- Poul Nyrup Rasmussen (born 1943), politician, Danish prime minister 1993–2001 (Social Democrats)
- Pernille Rosenkrantz-Theil (born 1977), politician (Social Democrats)
- Erik Scavenius (1877–1962), Danish prime minister (1943–1945)
- Poul Schlüter (1929–2021), politician, Danish prime minister 1982–1993 (Konservative Folkeparti)
- Johanne Schmidt-Nielsen (born 1984), politician (Enhedslisten)
- Johnny Søtrup (Venstre) (born 1949), mayor of Esbjerg (1994–2017)
- Erna Sørensen (1896–1980), (Conservative People's Party)
- Villy Søvndal (born 1952), politician (Socialistisk Folkeparti)
- Thorvald Stauning (1873–1942), politician, Danish prime minister 1924–1926 & 1929–1942 (Social Democrats)
- Helle Thorning-Schmidt (born 1966), politician, Danish prime minister 2011–2015 (Social Democrats)
- Margrethe Vestager (born 1968), politician (Det Radikale Venstre)
- Anna Westergaard (1882–1964), railway official, trade unionist, women's rights activist, politician (Social Liberal Party)

== Religion ==
- Absalon (c. 1128–1201), bishop of Roskilde (1158–1192), archbishop of Lund (1178–1201)
- Johanne Andersen, one of the first three women to be ordained as priests of the Church of Denmark
- Henning Toft Bro (1956–), bishop of Aalborg
- Hans Adolph Brorson (1694–1764), pietist and hymn writer, bishop of Ribe (1741–1764)
- Jacob Dacian, 16th-century Franciscan missionary to Mexico
- Karen Horsens (1932–), first female minister of the Church of Denmark to become a dean
- Thomas Kingo (1634–1703), poet and hymn writer, bishop of Funen (1677–1703)
- Czeslaw Kozon (1951–), Roman Catholic bishop of the Diocese of Copenhagen
- Stygge Krumpen (c. 1485–1551), last catholic bishop in Denmark (before the Lutheran reformation)
- Hans Ludvig Martensen (1927–2012), bishop of the Roman Catholic Diocese of Copenhagen (1965–1995)
- Bent Melchior (1929–2021), chief rabbi of Denmark (1969–1996)
- Knut Ansgar Nelson (1906–1990), Roman Catholic bishop of Stockholm (1957–1962)
- Peder Palladius (1503–1560), Lutheran reformator, bishop of Zealand (1537–1560)
- Kirsten Stoffregen Pedersen (1932–2017), nun, theologian, iconographer
- Edith Brenneche Petersen (1896–1973), one of the first three women to be ordained as Church of Denmark priests
- Lise-Lotte Rebel (1951–), first woman to become a bishop in the Church of Denmark (1995)
- Hans Svane (1634–1703), bishop of Zealand (1655–1668), archbishop (1660–1668)
- Hans Tausen (1494–1561), Lutheran reformator, bishop of Ribe (1542–1561)
- Ruth Vermehren (1894–1983), one of the Church of Denmark's first three women priests

== Royalty ==
=== Danish monarchs ===
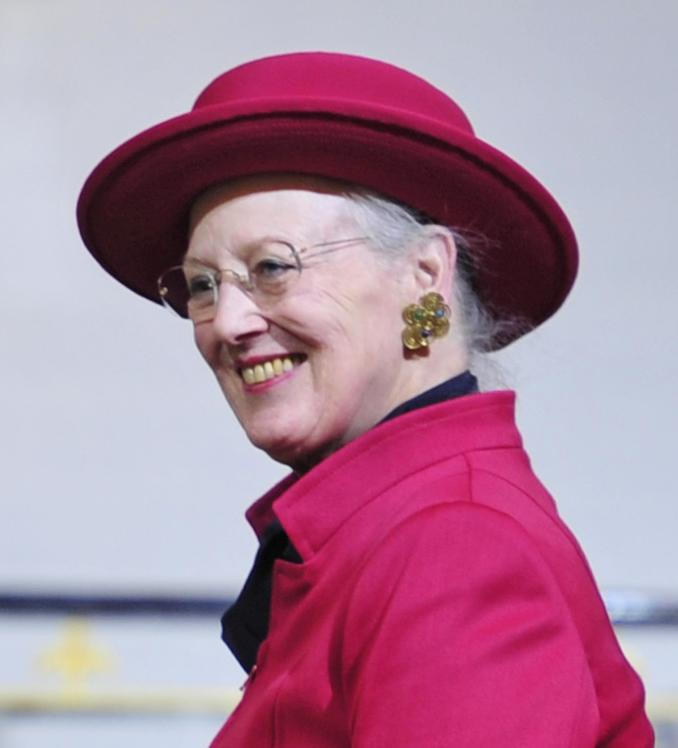
Queen Margrethe II

- Abel
- Canute the Great, King of England, Denmark and Norway
- Canute III
- Canute IV
- Canute V
- Canute VI
- Christian I
- Christian II, last king of the Kalmar Union
- Christian III
- Christian IV
- Christian V
- Christian VI
- Christian VII
- Christian VIII
- Christian IX, king known as the "Father-in-law of Europe"
- Christian X, king during German occupation
- Christopher I
- Christopher II
- Christopher of Bavaria
- Eric I
- Eric II
- Eric III
- Eric IV
- Eric V
- Eric VI
- Eric of Pomerania, crowned king of the Kalmar Union 1397
- Eric Christoffersen
- Frederick I
- Frederick II
- Frederick III
- Frederick IV
- Frederick V
- Frederick VI
- Frederick VII
- Frederik VIII
- Frederik IX
- Frederik X
- Gorm the Old
- Gnupa
- Gyrd
- Gøtrik, challenged Charlemagne in 810
- Harald
- Harald Klak
- Harald Bluetooth
- Harald II
- Harald III
- Harald Kesja
- Harthacnut (I)
- Helge
- Hemming
- Horik I
- Horik II
- John
- Magnus the Good
- Magnus Nielsen
- Margrethe I (1353–1412), unified the Scandinavian countries
- Margrethe II (1940–), also a writer, painter, translator and illustrator of books
- Niels
- Olof
- Oluf I
- Oluf II
- Oluf (II) Haraldsen
- Ongendus, first historical Danish king
- Reginfrid
- Sigfred
- Sigfred & Halfdan
- Sigtrygg
- Sweyn I, King of Denmark, Norway and England
- Sweyn II
- Sweyn III
- Toke Gormsson, king of Scania
- Valdemar I
- Valdemar II
- Valdemar III
- Valdemar IV Atterdag
- Valdemar the Young

=== Other Danish royalty ===
- Asfrid ( – 930s – ), Queen of Denmark, wife of Gnupa
- Thyra (? – 958(?)), Queen of Denmark (930s–958(?)), wife of Gorm the Old
- Margareta Hasbjörnsdatter, Queen of Denmark (1076–1080), wife of Harald Hen
- Bodil, ( –1103), Queen of Denmark (1095–1103), wife of Eric I
- Sophie of Mecklenburg-Güstrow (1557–1631), Queen of Denmark and Norway (1572–1588), wife of Frederick II
- Anne Sophie (1693–1743), Queen of Denmark and Norway (1721–1730), wife of Frederick IV
- Countess Danner (1815–1874), wife of Frederick VII
- Henrik, Prince Consort of Denmark (1934–2018), Prince Consort of Denmark
- Queen Mary of Denmark (1972–), Crown Princess of Denmark
- Princess Marie of Denmark (1976–), Princess of Denmark
- Count Nikolai of Monpezat (1999–)
- Count Felix of Monpezat (2002–)
- Crown Prince Christian of Denmark (2005–)

=== Danes becoming kings or regents in other countries ===
- George I
- Guthrum
- Harold Harefoot
- Haakon VII
- Johann (Prince)
- Magnus Henriksen
- Magnus of Livonia
- Olav V
- Rollo
- Svein Knutsson

=== Other foreign royalty ===
- Alexandra of Denmark (1844–1925), Queen of the United Kingdom and Empress of India, daughter of Christian IX
- Anne of Denmark (1574–1619), Queen of Scotland, England and Ireland, daughter of Frederick II
- Queen Anne-Marie of Greece (1946–), daughter of Frederik IX
- Christina of Denmark (c. 1118–1139), Queen of Norway, daughter of Canute Lavard
- Christina of Denmark, Queen of Sweden, daughter of Bjørn Ironside
- George, Prince of Denmark (1653–1708), Duke of Cumberland, son of Frederick III
- Ingeborg of Denmark (1175–1238), Queen of France, daughter of Valdemar I
- Ingeborg of Denmark (c. 1244–1287), Queen of Norway, daughter of Eric IV
- Ingerid of Denmark, Queen of Norway, daughter of Sweyn II
- Margaret of Denmark (1456–1486), Queen of Scotland, daughter of Christian I
- Maria Feodorovna (1847–1928), Empress of Russia, daughter of Christian IX
- Martha of Denmark (1277–1341), Queen of Sweden, daughter of Eric V
- Rikissa of Denmark (–1220), Queen of Sweden, daughter of Valdemar I
- Sophia of Denmark (1241–1286), Queen of Sweden, daughter of Eric IV
- Sophia Magdalena of Denmark (1746–1813), Queen of Sweden, daughter of Frederick V
- Tyra of Denmark, Queen of Norway, daughter of Harald Bluetooth
- Ulrika Eleonora of Denmark (1656–1693), Queen of Sweden, daughter of Frederick III

== Science and research ==
- Hanna Adler (1859–1947), early woman physicist and mixed school pioneer
- Julie Arenholt (1873–1952), early female civil engineer, women's rights activist
- Heinrich Louis d'Arrest, Prussian astronomer, died in Copenhagen
- Ove Arup (1895–1988), Danish-born leading engineer, founder of Arup
- Caspar Bartholin the Elder (1585–1629)
- Caspar Bartholin the Younger (1655–1738)
- Rasmus Bartholin (1625–1698)
- Thomas Bartholin (1616–1680)
- Tove Birkelund (1928–1986), historical geologist
- Aage Bohr (1922–2009), physicist and Nobel Prize laureate
- Harald Bohr (1887–1951), mathematician
- Niels Bohr (1885–1962), physicist and Nobel Prize laureate
- Tycho Brahe (1546–1601), provided the observational data for Kepler's laws of planetary motion
- Johannes Nicolaus Brønsted (1879–1947)
- Karen Callisen (1882–1970), geologist
- Claudius Clavus (Claudius Claussøn Swart) (1388–?)
- Carl Peter Henrik Dam (1895–1976)
- Willi Dansgaard (1922–2011), geophysics
- Johan Ludvig Emil Dreyer (1852–1926), Danish-born astronomer
- A. K. Erlang, engineer, industrial and systems engineer
- Henning Frederik Feilberg (1831–1921), philologist, folklorist and writer
- Johannes Andreas Grib Fibiger, physician and Nobel Prize laureate
- Thomas Fincke (1561–1656), mathematician
- Niels Ryberg Finsen (1860–1904), physician and Nobel Prize laureate
- Bent Flyvbjerg, geographer and theorist of phronetic social science
- Anca Giurchescu (1930–2015), Romanian-born folk dance researcher and academic
- Hans Christian Gram (1853–1938), bacteriologist (gram staining)
- Jørgen Pedersen Gram
- Marie Hammer (1907–2002), zoologist
- Emil Christian Hansen (1842–1909), Saccharomyces carlsbergensis
- Peter Andreas Hansen (1795–1874)
- David Heinemeier Hansson, Ruby on Rails (lives in the US)
- Lene Hau (1959–), physicist and professor at Harvard University
- Piet Hein (1905–1996), poet and designer
- Anders Hejlsberg, Turbo Pascal, Delphi, C# (lives in the US)
- Ejnar Hertzsprung (1873–1967), astronomer
- Harald Hirschsprung (1830–1916), physician
- Ole Humlum (born 1949), geologist and professor emeritus at the University of Oslo
- Niels Kaj Jerne, immunologist and Nobel Prize laureate
- Wilhelm Johannsen (1857–1927), coined the term "gene"
- Johannes Juul (1887–1969), inventor of wind turbines
- Christian Keller (1858–1934), physician
- Jens Martin Knudsen (1930–2005)
- Evald Tang Kristensen (1843–1929), folklore collector
- Schack August Steenberg Krogh, physiologist and Nobel Prize laureate
- Sine Larsen (1943–2025), chemist and crystallographer
- Niels A. Lassen, neuroimaging pioneer
- Inge Lehmann (1888–1993), seismologist (Earth's inner core)
- Rasmus Lerdorf, PHP (born in Greenland, lives in the US)
- Bergnart Carl Lewy (1817–1863), professor of chemistry
- Bodil Jerslev Lund (1919–2005), Danish chemist and pharmacist
- Peter Wilhelm Lund (1801–1880), paleontologist and zoologist, founder of Brazilian paleontology
- Conrad Malte-Brun (1775–1826)
- Georg Mohr (1640–1697), mathematician
- Peter Naur (1928–2016), Algol 60 and Backus-Naur form; Turing Award winner
- Ebbe Nielsen (1950–2001), entomologist
- Holger Bech Nielsen, physicist, co-inventor of string theory
- Jakob Nielsen (1890–1959), mathematician
- Jakob Nielsen (1957–), usability (lives in the US)
- Ida Ørskov (1922–2007), bacteriologist
- Hans Christian Ørsted (1777–1851), physicist, discoverer of electromagnetism, speed of light
- Asger Skovgaard Ostenfeld (1866–1931), civil engineer
- Julius Petersen (1839–1910), mathematician
- Ragna Rask-Nielsen (1900–1998), biochemist
- Christen C. Raunkiær (1860–1938), ecologist and botanist, plant life-form
- Ole Rømer (1644–1710), first to calculate the speed of light
- Ozer Schild (1930–2006), Danish-born Israeli academic, President of the University of Haifa and President of the College of Judea and Samaria ("Ariel College").
- Johannes Schmidt
- Marianne Schroll (born 1942), geriatrician
- Heinrich Christian Friedrich Schumacher (1757–1830)
- Birte Siim (born 1945), political scientist specializing in gender studies
- Jens Christian Skou, chemist and Nobel Prize laureate 1997
- Nicolas Steno / Niels Stensen (1638–1686), geologist, anatomist
- Bjarne Stroustrup (1950–), C++ (lives in the US)
- Bengt Strömgren (1908–1987)
- Bent Erik Sørensen (1941–), physicist and researcher into renewable energy
- Søren Peder Lauritz Sørensen (1868–1939), chemist
- Thorvald Sørensen (1902–1973), botanist
- Thorvald N. Thiele (1883–1910), astronomer, actuary and mathematician, most notable for his work in statistics, interpolation and the three-body problem
- Christian Jürgensen Thomsen, archaeologist, inventor of the three-age system
- Bjarne Tromborg (1940–), physicist
- Eugen Warming (1841–1924), ecologist and botanist
- Caspar Wessel (1745–1818), Norwegian-Danish mathematician
- Jacob B. Winsløw (1669–1760)
- Ole Worm (1588–1654)

== Writers ==
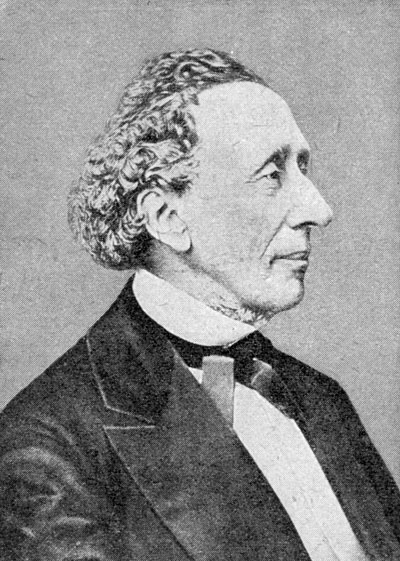
Hans Christian Andersen

- Hans Christian Andersen (1805–1875), Fairy Tales
- Hansine Andræ (1817–1898), feminist diarist
- Jens Immanuel Baggesen (1764–1826)
- Karen Blixen (aka Isak Dinesen) (1885–1962), author (Out of Africa, Seven Gothic Tales)
- Georg Brandes (1842–1927)
- Suzanne Brøgger (1944–), novelist and essayist
- Tove Ditlevsen (1918–1976), poet and author
- Holger Drachmann (1846–1908), poet and painter
- Bent Faurby (1937–), children's writer
- Kate Fleron (1909–2006), journal editor, resistance member
- Piet Hein (1905–1996)
- Dagmar Hjort (1860–1902), schoolteacher, writer and women's rights activist
- Peter Høeg (1957–), author
- Bernhard Severin Ingemann (1789–1862) novelist, poet and hymn writer
- FP Jac (1955–2008), poet
- Jens Peter Jacobsen (1847–1885), novelist (Niels Lyhne)
- Thit Jensen (1876–1957), writer and worker for women's suffrage
- Dorthe Jørgensen (1959–), philosopher and educator, first Danish woman to be awarded the honorary Dr.Phil
- Christian Jungersen (1962–)
- Hans Kirk (1898–1962), author
- Cornelia von Levetzow (1836–1921), popular novelist
- Hulda Lütken (1896–1946), poet and novelist
- Bodil Neergaard (1867–1959), estate owner, philanthropist, memoirist
- Martin Andersen Nexø (1869–1954), writer (Pelle, the Conqueror)
- Adam Gottlob Oehlenschläger (1779–1850)
- Henrik Pontoppidan, author and Nobel Prize laureate
- Jacob Riis (1849–1914), photographer, journalist and social activist in the US
- Edith Rode (1879–1956), novelist and journalist
- Alba Schwartz (1857–1942), novelist
- Ingeborg Maria Sick (1858–1951), novelist and biographer
- Tage Skou-Hansen (1925–), novels include De nøgne træer (The Naked Trees)
- Carl Erik Soya (1896–1993), author, playwright, poet, satirist
- Villy Sørensen (1929–2001), author
- Dan Turéll (1946–1993), author
- Fanny Tuxen (1832–1906), children's writer
- Johannes Østrup (1867–1938), philologist, educator, writer

== Other notables ==
- Andreas Aagesen (1826–1879), jurist
- Jette Albinus (1966–), first female general in the Danish army
- Vibeke Ammundsen (1913–1988), librarian, head of Denmark's Technical Library
- Finn Andersen, Secretary General of Danish Cultural Institute
- Ingeborg Appel (1869–1948), folk high school teacher
- Fredrik Bajer, writer, MP, peace researcher, Nobel Peace Prize Laureate 1908
- Anne Bruun (1853–1934), women's rights activist
- Biker-Jens, reality TV star
- Jutta Bojsen-Møller (1837–1927), high school proponent, women's rights activist
- Line Bonde (c.1979–), in 2006 first Danish woman to become a fighter pilot
- Aase Bredsdorff (1919–2017), Danish library inspector specialising in children's literature
- Ellen Johanne Broe (1900–1994), nurse and nursing educator
- Degn Brøndum (1856–1932), proprietor of Brøndums Hotel in Skagen frequented by the Skagen Painters
- Christine Buhl Andersen (born 1967), museum director
- Henrik Kurt Carlsen, sea captain
- Esther Carstensen (1873–1955), feminist, journal editor
- Ellen Christensen (1913–1998), nurse and resistance fighter
- B.S. Christiansen, Danish special force soldier, TV personality
- Louise Conring (1824–1891), first trained nurse in Denmark, head of Copenhagen's Deaconess Institute
- Natasja Crone Back, journalist, host at the Eurovision Song Contest 2001
- Alma Dahlerup (1874–1969), Danish-American philanthropist
- Thomas Dam
- Thora Daugaard (1874–1951), women's rights activist and pacifist
- Bodil Dybdal (1901–1992), first woman to be appointed judge in the Supreme Court of Denmark
- Annelise Ebbe (1950–2020), Danish peace activist and translator
- Ragnhild Fabricius Gjellerup (1896–1958), Denmark's first female judge
- Anette Fischer (1946–1992), librarian and head of Amnesty International's International Board
- Nicolai Frahm, art advisor and collector
- Merete Gerlach-Nielsen (1933–2019), academic, UNESCO official, co-founder of KVINFO
- Anne Gøye (1609–1681), noblewoman, book collector
- Jutta Graae (1906–1997), Danish resistance fighter and archivist
- Gus Hansen, professional poker player
- Estrid Hein (1873–1956), ophthalmologist, women's rights activist and pacifist
- Ville Heise (1838–1912), philanthropist
- Birte Høeg Brask (1918–1997), Danish resistance fighter and psychiatrist
- Niels Ingwersen (1935–2009), promoter of Scandinavian literature and culture in the United States
- Ingrid Jespersen (1867–1938), pedagogue and school principal
- Karen Johnsen (1899–1990), high court judge
- Jørgen Jørgensen, 19th-century adventurer famous for ruling Iceland for 2 months
- Katja Kean, former professional porn star; first Danish worldwide porn star
- Charlotte Klein (1834–1915), educator, art school principal and women's rights activist
- Nanna Kristensen-Randers (1864–1908), lawyer, folk school administrator
- Lars Kruse (1828–1894), Skagen fisherman and heroic lifesaver
- Marie Kruse (1842–1923), pioneering schoolteacher and girls school principal
- Anders Lassen, British Major, the only foreign soldier in the British forces in the Second World War to be awarded the Victoria Cross
- Lis Lauritzen, Cruise ship Captain
- Anna Laursen (1845–1911), educator and women's rights activist
- Magdalene Lauridsen (1873–1957), headmistress, school founder, women's rights activist
- Rasmus Lerdorf, creator of PHP (Greenland)
- Bjørn Lomborg, skeptical environmentalist
- Henny Magnussen (1878–1937), lawyer
- Margrethe Marstrand (1874–1948), schoolteacher and writer, word-picture reading expert
- Ellen Marsvin (1572–1649), landowner and county administrator
- Lone Maslocha (1921–1945), resistance fighter
- Camilla Mordhorst (born 1970), museum director
- Marie Mørk (1861–1944), teacher, school founder
- Charlotte Munck (1876–1932), nurse, important figure in the training of nurses
- Flemming Muus, resistance fighter and author
- Jørgen de Mylius, TV and radio presenter
- Olivia Nielsen (1852–1910), women's trade unionist leader
- Benedict Nordentoft (1873–1942), Danish educator and cleric; co-founder of Solvang, California
- Charlotte Norrie (1855–1940), nursing campaigner and women's rights activist
- Knud Olsen, boat designer
- Camilla Ottesen, TV host
- Deepika Padukone (1986–), Danish-born Indian actress
- Johanne Christine Petersen (1847–1922), pioneering educator of handicapped children
- Valdemar Poulsen (1869–1942), inventor of the tape recorder
- Hjalmar Rechnitzer (1872–1953), Danish naval officer
- Gabriele Rohde (1904–1946), League of Nations official and member of the Danish Council in London in World War II
- Marie Rovsing (1814–1888), women's rights activist
- Søren Ryge Petersen (1945–), author, TV host
- Andrea Elisabeth Rudolph, radio and TV host
- Jette Sandahl (1949–), museum director
- Frida Schmidt (1849–1934), Danish women's rights activist and suffragist
- Josephine Schneider (1820–1887), Danish philosopher and school principal
- Henriette Skram (1841–1929), school principal and writer
- Ingeborg Suhr Mailand (1871–1969), educator and cookbook writer
- Marie Toft (1813–1854), landowner and religious revivalist, second wife of N.F.S. Grundtvig
- Ulla Terkelsen (born 1944), foreign correspondent for TV 2
- Lone Træholt (1958–), first female general in the Danish armed forces
- Clara Tybjerg (1864–1941), women's rights activist and pacifist
- Elisa Ussing (1885–1949), pioneering female lawyer and judge
- Martha Wærn (1741–1812), philanthropist
- Monica Wichfeld, entrepreneur and resistance fighter
- Anna Wulff (1874–1935), educator, pioneering kindergarten teaching
- Sophie Zahrtmann (1841–1925), deaconess, nurse, head of Copenhagen's Deaconess Institute

== See also ==
- List of Danish Americans
- List of Danish Jews
- List of Danish nurses
