= Jakob Martin Strid =

Danish cartoonist

Jakob Martin Strid is a Danish cartoonist, who is known throughout Denmark for his successful series Strid in the Danish newspaper Politiken.

Before his mainstream success he drew for the socialist paper Socialisten; both runs consisted mostly of satire on political events. He is decidedly on the political left, but every public figure is a target. His Strid series in Politiken featured (mostly) the artist himself (as his sobriquet Strid) drawing, inviting guests and wandering off into intentionally far-fetched plots. There was much controversy around the strip when it ran in Politiken as he expressed sympathy with the Rote Armee Fraktion.

In 2012, Strid received the Danish Crown Prince Couple's Culture Prize.
