= Nicolai Vemming =

Danish theatre producer

Nicolai Vemming (born July 7, 1961 in Copenhagen, Denmark) is a Danish theatre producer and Managing Director. He is CEO and co-founder of Pont Neuf, performing fine arts

Trained visual artist from Billedskolen in Copenhagen, Vemming was producer at The Danish National School of Theatre and Contemporary Dance in Copenhagen 1989–93. In 1993, he became deputy manager and from 1998 artistic and managing director of Malmö City Theatre, Sweden.

In 2001, Vemming was appointed deputy artistic director at The Royal Danish Theatre in Copenhagen where he from 2004 headed an extensive program of International guest performances and collaborations with Frank Castorf, Jonathan Meese, Alain Platel, Luc Perceval, Johann Kresnik and Christoph Marthaler.

In 2009 Nicolai Vemming founded the independent production company Unlimited Performing Arts. The Company has produced and toured productions in Europe, USA and China.

From 2016 to 2020 Vemming was co- founder and CEO of the European bureau of MusicAeterna orchestra and choir with offices in Copenhagen and Paris.

He is co-founder and CEO of Pont Neuf, performing fine arts with offices in Paris and Copenhagen.
