= Sanne Søndergaard =

Danish writer and comedian (born 1980)

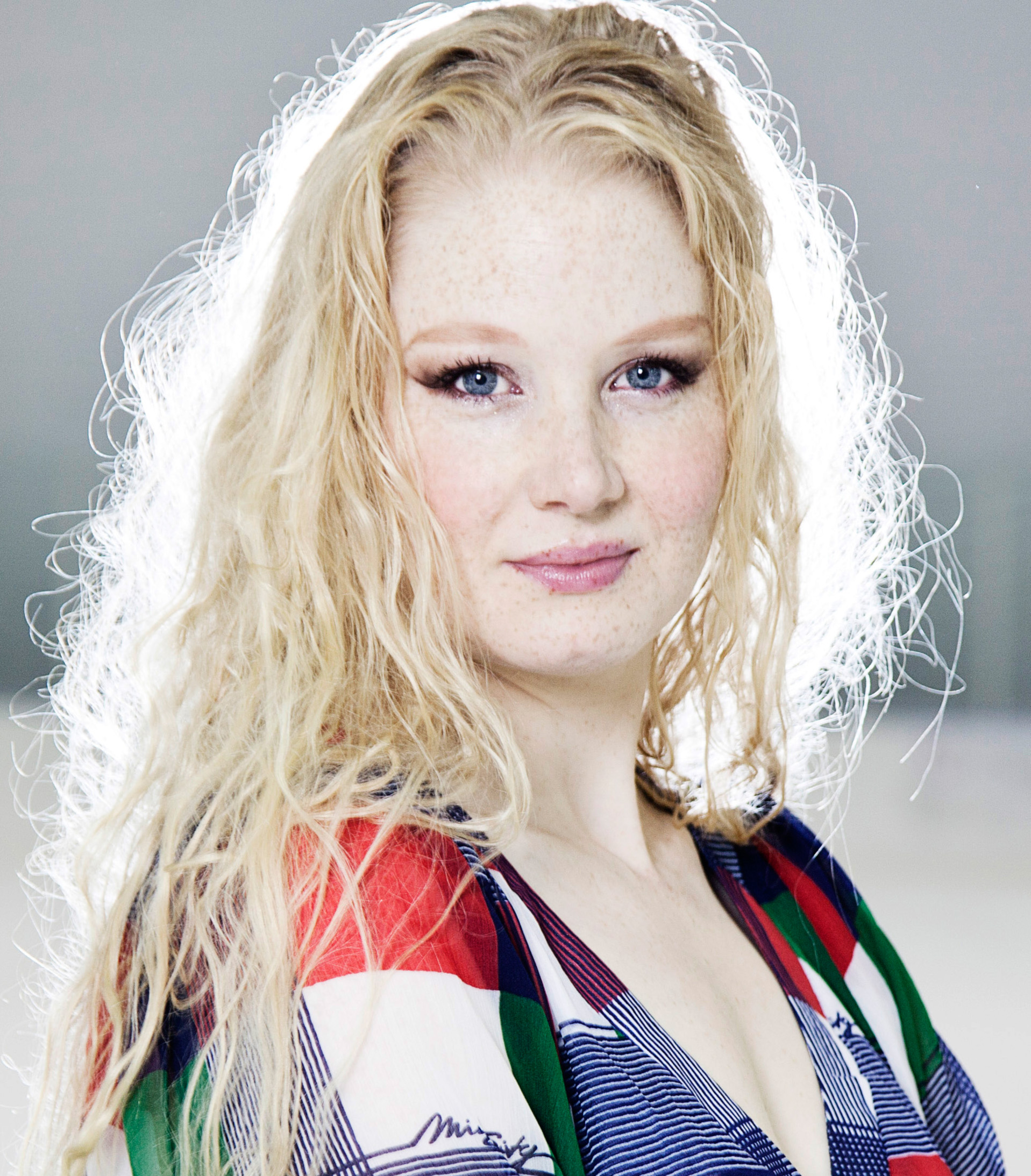
Sanne Søndergaard (2022)

Sanne Søndergaard (born 1980) is a Danish writer and stand-up comedian. Published in 2008, her first novel for young readers, Kære Dødsbog (Dear Death Diary), was positively received. Her autobiographical Solo - med mit køn på slæb (Solo - with my sex in tow) appeared in 2015. Søndergaard embarked on a successful career as a comedian in 2005, appearing in a wide variety of shows. She has contributed to women's magazines and appeared in Danish television and radio programmes.

== Biography ==
Born on 2 April 1980 in Ikast in central Jutland, Sanne Søndergaard studied at the Danish School of Journalism in Aarhus, graduating in 2004. She then embarked on gender studies at the University of Copenhagen but did not complete the course. From an early age she took every chance she could to perform, hoping to become an actress. But as she could not sing, she decided instead to turn to writing.

She embarked on her career as a comedian at Copenhagen's Comedy Zoo in 2004 where she was so successful that she was immediately taken on tour. Two years later, she was a semifinalist in the Danish stand-up championship. She went on to appear in various on stage performances, including a number of solo shows, as well as on Danish radio and television, On several occasions she entertained the Danish troops in Afghanistan.

As a writer her works include three youth novels, Kære dødsbog (2008), Proforma (2011) and Hell man (2012). Her autobiography Solo - med mit køn på slæb was published in 2015.
