= Karen Johnsen =

Danish lawyer and judge

Karen Emilie Johnsen (1899–1980) was an early female Danish lawyer and judge. In 1949, she became the second woman in Denmark to serve as a high court judge, following in the footsteps of Ragnhild Fabricius Gjellerup. She was particularly active in dealing with property cases resulting from the Second World War. Johnsen also supported women's interests, serving on the board of the Danish Women's Society for almost 20 years. In 1952, she represented Denmark at the UNESCO conference in Paris.

== Biography ==
Born in Copenhagen on 9 September 1899, Karen Emilie Johnsen was the daughter of the lawyer George Johnsen (1871–1935) and Emilie Vilhelmine Marie Grønqvist (1871–1937). After matriculating from N. Zahle's School in 1918, encouraged by her father, she studied law at the University of Copenhagen, graduating in 1924. For her thesis on family law, she became the first woman ever to be awarded the university's gold medal. In view of the limited opportunities for women lawyers at the time, Johnsen began her career with an unpaid job at the Diocese of Copenhagen. After helping her father for a short period, in 1925 she was employed as a secretary in Copenhagen's municipal court. She was promoted to the rank of proxy judge in 1935 and to municipal judge in 1939, the first women to reach the position. From 1949 until her retirement in 1966, she was a judge for the Østre Landsret, one of Denmark's two high courts. She was involved in a number of large post-war cases, some of which ended in the death penalty, which she accepted against her will as a necessity of the times. She was also active in advancing equal legal treatment of children, whether born in or out of matrimony. She also achieved more equitable treatment of prostitutes, bringing cases under social rather than penal legislation.

Johnsen was also active in the women's movement, becoming a board member of the Danish Women's Society (1930–49) and of Kvindelige Akademikere (Female Academics), a society for university women (1938–48). Given her interest in education, in 1953, she represented Denmark at the UNESCO conference in Paris.

After she retired in 1966, she left her legal interests behind, spending the rest of her life with her childhood friend and long-standing companion Zenia Kühn (1898–1985). Together they were engaged in travelling, reading and visiting art exhibitions. Karen Johnsen died in Virum, just north of Copenhagen, on 17 November 1980.

== Awards ==
In 1951, Johnsen was one of the first women to be honoured with the Order of the Dannebrog. In 1954, she became a First Class Knight, in 1966 a Commander.
