= Louise Nyholm Kallestrup =

Danish historian (born 1975)

Louise Nyholm Kallestrup (born 1975) is a Danish historian. She is a professor at the University of Southern Denmark (Odense) and the director of its Centre for Medieval and Renaissance Studies who specializes in the Early Modern Period. Best known for her comparative research on witchcraft trials in Denmark and Italy. Kallestrup has also written widely on such related topics as gender in the contexts of legal proceedings and urbanization, and on demonology and is a frequent cultural commentator in the Danish press and on radio.

Among the very early scholars to be allowed to work in the Vatican’s Inquisitorial archives (Archivio della Congregazione per la Dottrina della Fede), Kallestrup has also been a visiting researcher at Harvard University, the University of Tampere, and the University of Melbourne. In 2017, she was named a 'Semper Ardens' Fellow of The Carlsberg Foundation, and in the same year, appeared onstage in a series of multimedia performances across Denmark marking the 500th anniversary of the Luthern Reformation.

== Select publications ==
- I pagt med djævelen. Trolddomsforfølgelser og trolddomsforestillinger i Danmark og Italien i den post-reformatoriske periode. Forlaget Anis, 2009.
- Agents of Witchcraft in Early Modern Italy and Denmark. Palgrave Historical Studies in Witchcraft and Magic. Palgrave Macmillan, 2015.
- Contesting Orthodoxy in Medieval and Early Modern Europe: Heresy, Magic and Witchcraft. Palgrave Historical Studies in Witchcraft and Magic. Palgrave Macmillan, 2017. Anthology co-edited with R. M. Toivo.
- Cultural Histories of Crime in Denmark 1500-2000. Routledge Studies in Cultural History, 55. Routledge, 2017. Anthology co-edited with T. Krogh and C. Bundgaard.
