= Per K. Sørensen =

Danish Tibetologist

Per Kjeld Sørensen (born 18 December 1950, Denmark) is a prominent Danish Tibetologist who specialises in Tibetan and Himalayan history, literature and culture. Since 1994, he has been Professor of Central Asian Studies (Zentralasienwissenschaften, Tibetology and Mongol Studies) at Leipzig University, Germany.

== Biography ==
Sørensen was the first person to receive a Magister in Tibetology in Scandinavia. In 1990, Sørensen defended his doctoral thesis at Copenhagen, Divinity Secularized. An Inquiry into the Nature and Form of the Songs Ascribed to the Sixth Dalai Lama (Wien 1990).

Sørensen has teaching commitments and experience from Denmark, Sweden, Finland and the United States. He was the recipient of an Alexander von Humboldt Stipend (1991–92) in Bonn, Germany, a sojourn that resulted in one of his most well-known works, Tibetan Buddhist Historiography (1994).

From 1994 to 2017, he held the chair of Professor of Central Asian Studies (Zentralasienwissenschaften, Tibetology and Mongol Studies) at Leipzig University in Germany, which has a long tradition of oriental studies.

Sørensen has travelled widely in Tibet, Bhutan, Nepal and the Himalayas. He has been involved in a number of prestigious projects in his field and also editorial commitments. From 1995 until 2010, he headed a long-term Danish-funded twinning project at the National Library of Bhutan, conducted in collaboration with the Royal Library of Denmark. He has held lectures around the world and is currently a board member of the International Association for Tibetan Studies (IATS).

In 2015 he was a participant in the Tibet Research Group on “Tibetan Genealogies" at the Berlin Institute for Advanced Study, with Guntram Harzod (the head), Tsering Gyalpo (of Lhasa, Tibet) and Shen Weirong (of Beijing, China).

As of fall 2017, he is the Numata Visiting Professor in Buddhism at the University of California, Berkeley.

== Bibliography ==
=== Publications ===
This is a selective list of his publications, including co-authored works:

- A Fourteenth Century Tibetan Historical Work: rGyal-rabs gsal ba'i me long. Author, Date and Sources - A Case-Study. Fontes Tibetici Havnienses Vol 1. Akademisk Forlag (København) 1986: X, 1-300. ISBN 87-500-2665-8
- Candrakirti's Triśaranasaptati. The Septuagint on the Three Refuges. Edited, Translated and Annotated. Wiener Studien zur Tibetologie und Buddhismuskunde. Vol. 16. Vienna 1986: 1-89.
- Divinity Secularized: An Inquiry into the Nature and Form of the Songs Ascribed to the Sixth Dalai Lama. Wiener Studien zur Tibetologie und Buddhismuskunde. Vol. 25. Vienna 1990: 1-466. (Dissertation).
- A Provisional List of Tibetological Research Papers and Articles Published in the People's Republic of China and Tibet. Nepal Research Centre Publ. Vol 17. Kathmandu. 1991: 1-101.
- Tibetan Buddhist Historiography: The Mirror Illuminating the Royal Genealogies. An Annotated Translation of the XIVth Century Chronicle rGyal-rabs gsal-ba'i me-long. Asiatische Forschungen 128. Wiesbaden. 1994: 1-678. (Chinese Ed. 2016, Beijing)
- A Collection of Tibetan Proverbs and Sayings. Gems of Tibetan Wisdom and Wit. Tibetan and Indo-Tibetan Studies Vol. 7. Fr. Steiner Verlag. Wiesbaden. 1998: XXXII, 1-444. (Co-author: C. Cuppers). ISBN 978-3-515-07029-4
- Sayings and Proverbs from Bhutan: Wisdom and Wit in Dzongkha Idiom. Thimphu 1999: 1-66 (Co-author: Tsewang Nidup).
- Civilization at the Foot of Mount Sham-po. The Royal House of lHa Bug-pa-can and the History of g.Ya'-bzang. Verlag der Österreichischen Akademie der Wissenschaften. Co-authors: G. Hazod, Tsering Gyalbo. Wien 2000: 1-340.
- The Biography of Pha-jo Drukgom zhigpo: The Current of Compassion. The National Library of Bhutan. 2001: 1-88. (Co-author: Dr. Yonten Dagye).
- Thundering Falcon. An inquiry into the History and Cult of Khra-brug.Tibet’s first Buddhist Temple. Verlag der Österreichischen Akademie der Wissenschaften. 2005: 1-405. Co-author: Guntram Hazod.
- Rulers on the Celestial Plain. Ecclesiastic and Hegemonic Rule in Central Tibet. Verlag der Österreichischen Akademie der Wissenschaften. 2007. 2 Vols.: 1-1011. Co-authors Guntram Hazod.
- Rare Texts from Tibet. Seven Sources for the Ecclesiastical History of Medieval Tibet. Lumbini: LIRI. Nepal. 2007: 1-410.
- Play of the Omniscient. The Life and Legacy of the 17th century Bhutanese Saint Jamgön Ngawang Gyeltsen. Thimphu. 200.: 1-294. (Co-authors: Yonten Dargye, Gönpo Tsering) ISBN 9993617067
- Contribution to Olle Qvarnström (ed, and tr.) Bhāviveka on Sāmkhya and Vedānta. The Sāmkhyatattvanirnayāvatāra and Vedāntatattvaviniścaya chapters of the Madhyamakahrdayakārikā and Tarkajvālā. Harvard Oriental Series 78. 2015.
- The Royal History of Sikkim: A Chronicle of the House of Namgyal as Narrated in Tibetan by their Highnesses Chogyal Thutob Namgyal and Gyalmo Yeshe Dolma. Co-authors: John Ardussi and Anna Balicki Denjongpa.2021 Chicago: Serindia Publications. ISBN 978-1932476-39-2.
- Wearing the World. Glimpses of the Cultural History of Turquoises in Tibet: The Rinchen Gyencha or the Potala ‘Precious Ornament‘ Psageant. Co-author: Joachim G. Karsten. 2025. New Delhi: Adarsh Books.
- Recent Research on Tibet. A Festschrift for Guntram Hazod on the Occasion of his 70th Birthday. Co-author: Christian Jahoda. 2026. 2 vols. Vienna: Institute for Social Anthropology. https://doi.org/10.1553/978OEAW50671

=== Selection of major articles ===
- Two Minor Works of Sa-skya Pandita. Studies in Central and East Asian Religions. Vol. 1. Copenhagen 1988: 35-49. (Co-author: J. Schoening).
- Tibetan Love Lyrics: The Love Songs of the Sixth Dalai Lama. An Annotated Translation of Tshangs-dbyangs rgya-mtsho'i mgul-glu. Indo-Iranian Journal Vol. 31 (4). 1988: 253-98.
- The Tibetan Text of the Vedantatattvaviniścaya Chapter of Bhavya's Madhyamakahrdayakārikā. O. Qvarnström, Hindu Philosophy in Buddhist Perspective. The Vedantaviniścaya Chapter of Bhavya's Madhyamakahrdayakārikā. Lund Studies in Africa and Asian Religions. Vol. 4. 1989: 131-153.
- A Survey of Research Centres and Institutes of Tibetology in the People's Republic of China and Tibet. Studies in Central and East Asian Religions. Vol. 3, 1990: 113-124.
- Dynastic Genealogies and Regal Successions: Etiological Theories and the Pre-historic Line in the Tibetan Yar-lung Dynasty Reflected in Tibetan Sources - New Material and Assessments. Studies in Central and East Asian Religions. Vol. 4. 1991: 63-81.
- The Classification and Depositing of Books and Scriptures Kept in the National Library of Bhutan. Studies in Central and East Asian Religions. Vol. 9. 1996: 98-105.
- The Prolific Ascetic lCe-sgom Shes-rab rdo-rje alias lCe-sgom zhig-po: Allusive, but Elusive. Journal of Nepal Research Centre Vol. XI. 1999. Kathmandu/Wiesbaden. 1999: 176-200.
- A XIth Century Ascetic of Buddhist Eclecticism: Kha-rag sgom-chung. in Kollmar-Paulenz (ed.). Tractata Tibetica et Mongolica. Festschrift für Klaus Sagaster zum 65. Geburtstag. Asiatische Forschungen 145, 2002, Harrassowitz-Verlag, Wiesbaden, 2002: 241-254.
- Lhasa Diluvium, Sacred Environment at Stake: The Birth of Flood Control Politics, the Question of Natural Disaster Management and their Importance for the Hegemony over a National Monument in Tibet. Lungta 16, Cosmogony and the Origins, 2004, Amnye Machen Institute, Dharamshala (H.P.), India. 2004: 85-134.
- Eine Sieben Thangka Sukzessions-Serie des Neunten Dalai Lama. M. Brauen (ed.) Die Dalai Lamas. Tibets Reinkarnationen des Bodhisattva Avalokiteśvara, 2005, Arnoldsche, Stuttgart. 2005: 242-257. (English Version: The Dalai Lamas. Serindia Publ.
- The Dalai Lama Institution: Its Origin and Genealogical Succession. Orientations. Hong-Kong. 2005: 53-60.
- The Career of a Bhutanese Saint. in: T.T. Barthelemew, J. Johnston (eds.) The Dragon’s Gift, Sacred Art of Bhutan. Chicago. Serindia Publ. 2008: pp. 100–113. ISBN 978-1932476-35-4
- Restless Relic. The Arya Lokeśvara Icon: Symbol of Power, Legitimacy, and Pawn for Patronage. in B. Kellner ed. et al., Pramanakirtih: Papers Dedicated to Ernst Steinkellner on the Occasion of his 70th Birthday. Vol. II: pp. 857–885. Wien: WSTB. 2007.
- The Sacred Junipers of Reting: The Arboreal Origins Behind the Dalai Lama Lineage. Orientations 2007: 74–79.
- Prolegomena to Tibetan Folk Literature and Popular Poetic Idiom: Scope and Typology. Shen Weirong (沈衛榮) ed., Historical and Philological Studies of China’s Western Regions (西域歷史語言研究集刊), Beijing: Science Press (科學出版社), 2010 (3): 145-68.
- An Inquiry into the Nature of Tibetan Proverbs. Proverbium 30 (2013): 281-309. (Co-author: F. X. Erhard).
- Tibetan Proverbial Literature: Semantics and Metaphoricity in Context. F.K.Ehrhard & P.- Maurer (eds.). /Nepalica-Tibetica. Festgabe for Christoph Cüppers. Beiträge zur Zentralasienforschung B. 28: Vol. 2: 237-252. (Co-author: F. X. Erhard).
- Coveted Relic. The Khasarpāṇi Idol of Bhutan. In: Hanna Havnevik and Charles Ramble (eds.), From Bhakti to Bon: Festschrift for Per Kvaerne. Oslo: Novus Forlag. 2015: 497-512. (co-author; Olle Qvarnström).
- Tibetan Religious Historiography. History and Religion. Narrating a Religious Past. Bernd-Christian Otto, S. Rau, and J. Rüpke (eds.). Religionsgeschichtliche Versuche und Vorarbeiten 68. Verlag de Gruyter. 2015: 151-64
- Keynote: A Story of Academic and Cultural Curiosity. Leipzig and the Rise of Tibetology in Germany". In: Erhard, F. X., J Bischoff, L. Doney, J. Heimbel, E.R. Sulek (eds.). "Ancient Currents, New Traditions. Papers presented at the Fourth International Seminar of Young Tibetologists. Edition Tethys Wissenschaft. Potsdam 2017: 1-12.
- Srong btsan sgam po Revisited. Ancestral King, Monarchic Founder, Buddhist Saviour Saint and Cultural Hero. In: G. Hazod & Shen Weirong (eds.) 西藏宗谱：念古格次仁加布藏 学研究文集 Xizang zongpu: Jinian Guge Cirenjiabu zangxue lunwen ji / Tibetan Genealogies: Studies in Memoriam of Guge Tsering Gyalpo (1961–2015). (Beijing: 中国藏学出版社 Zhongguo zangxue chubanshe). 2018: pp. 153–90.
- The Invention of the Reincarnation Lineage of ’rGyal dbang ’Brug chen. (co-author Hou Haoran). In: Kumagai, Seiji (ed.) Buddhism, Culture and Society in Bhutan. Proceedings of the Bhutan Panel. Bergen IATS Conference 2016. Kyoto 2017.
- Rise of the Dalai Lamas: Political Inheritance through Reincarnation. In: Debreczeny, Karl (ed.) Faith and Empire: Art and Politics in Tibetan Buddhism.(2019) New York: Rubin Museum of Arts. (pp 151–59).ISBN 978-0-692-19460-7
- In his Name: The Fake Royal Biography—Fabricated Prophecy and Literary Imposture. in Revue d’Etudes Tibétaines, no. 52, Octobre 2019, pp. 284-335.
