= Ridin' Thumb =

Danish soul/funk band

Ridin' Thumb is a Danish soul/funk orchestra formed in 1989 by the two guitarists Martin Finding and Nicolai Halberg. In 1997, Jonas Winge Weiner replaced Niels H.P. as the lead vocalist. Their style can be compared to artists such as Tower of Power and Jamiroquai. The group has released four full-length albums and one EP.

== Members ==
- Jonas Winge Leisner – vocal
- Stine Hjelm Jacobsen – vocal
- Joakim Pedersen – keyboards
- Martin Finding – guitar
- Nicolai Halberg – guitar
- Jens Kristian Uhrenholdt – bass guitar
- Thomas Jepsen – drums
- Martin Pedersen – scratch
- Bjørn Ringkjøbing – trumpet
- Hendrik Jørgensen – trumpet
- Mik Neumann – tenor saxophone
- Ole Himmelstrup – baritone saxophone

== Concerts ==
The band usually unites for an annual concert between Christmas and New Year's Eve. The concerts are held at the Copenhagen Jazz House.

== Discography ==
=== Albums ===
Year	Album	Peak positions	Notes
Year	Album	DEN	Notes
1994	Different Moves, Different Grooves (Sundance)		Track list: 1. Feed the cat 2. Different strokes – Different folks 3. In the middle 4. Do the boomeloom 5. Believe to my soul 6. Know what I mean 7. Believe me 8. Nitty Gritty; 9. A Song for You; 10. Ridin' Thumb; 11. Thick and thin
2000	21st Century Funk (Sundance)		Track list: 1. The Future; 2. Make it right 3. Like it like that 4. Time; 5. Natures kingdom 6. Some people 7. Family affair 8. The good men 9. So much better 10. Living it out 11. Pump up the thumb
2002	Work It Out (Sundance)		Track list: 1. Tune in (intro); 2. Set your mind free 3. I've been waitin' 4. Interlude; 5. I told you so 6. True to myself 7. Party down 8. Work it out 9. Jackson; 10. Rainy Monday; 11. In a different way 12. Time 4 some action 13. Back again 14. Doing nothing
2014	People (Sundance)	39	Track list: 1. Do You Feel the Same; 2. People; 3. I Need Someone to Hold on To; 4. Whirl Around; 5. What You Drop; 6. I Can Change; 7. Allright with Me; 8. Everything Has Changed

=== EPs ===
- 1993: Ridin' Thumb

=== Singles ===
Date	Song title	PAlbum
1994	"In The Middle"	Different Strokes, Different Folks
1994	"Different Strokes, Different Folks"	Different Strokes, Different Folks
2000	"The Future"	21st Century Funk
2000	"Make It Right"	21st Century Funk
2002	"Party Down"	Work It Out
2002	"Work It Out"	Work It Out
2002	"Back Again"	Work It Out
