= Vibeke Ammundsen =

Danish librarian

Ingrid Vibeke Ammundsen née Simonsen (1913–1988) was a Danish librarian who was active in the research library sector. From 1957, she headed Denmark's Technical Library (Danmarks Tekniske Bibliotek) where she introduced computerized search systems in the early 1960s. When the library moved to Lyngby in 1971 to serve the Technical University of Denmark, she broke new ground for research libraries by introducing open shelves for books and journals, allowing visitors direct access to the library's holdings. In the 1970s, she proposed and headed the DANDOK database system for scientific and technical information.

== Early life and education ==
Born in Kerteminde on 22 December 1913, Ingrid Vibeke Simonsen was the daughter of the headmaster Steffen Simonsen (1884–1930) and Ane Dorthea Nielsen (1885–1893), a schoolteacher. On 8 July 1936 she married Johannes Ammundsen (1913–1982) who later became director of the Danish Employers' Association. They had three children: Steffen (1940), Peter (1945) and Charlotte (1947). After matriculating from Haderslev Cathedral School, she studied English and Voice at the University of Copenhagen, graduating in 1939.

== Career ==
Ammundsen began her career as in 1940 in the library at the Foreign Ministry. The following year, she took up employment as a librarian at the Royal Agricultural College. In World War II, when her husband was arrested by the Germans in 1942, she continued his clandestine work and in 1946–1947 served as secretary of the Copenhagen branch of the resistance group Frit Danmark (Free Denmark).

In 1957, she was appointed head of the Danish Technical Library, bringing it into an exemplary position among Denmark's research libraries. In 1966, she introduced computer systems for library support or search. When the library moved to Lyngby in 1971, she provided open access to the shelves for both books and periodicals. Her approach was reflected in the library for the University of Aalborg and in several Swedish libraries.

Vibeke Ammundesen retired in 1980 and moved together with her husband to central Copenhagen. She died there on 12 February 1988.
