= Ragna Rask-Nielsen =

Danish biochemist

Ragna Marie Jenny Rask-Nielsen née Jensen (1900–1998) was a Danish biochemist and medical researcher. After she earned a PhD with a dissertation on the development of carcinogenic tumors in mice in 1948, she carried out laboratory-based studies on antibody-producing tumors. In 1963, her groundbreaking work on viruses causing cancerous lymphoma was published in the journal Nature. When she died at the age of 97, she left her large fortune to a research foundation.

== Biography ==
Born on 15 September 1900 in Skive, Denmark, Jutland, Ragna Marie Jenny Jensen was the daughter of the merchant Emil Carl Jensen (1874–1948) and his wife Anna née Hansen (1872–1929). In October 1923 she married the specialist physician Hans Christian Rask-Nielsen (1896–1928). The marriage was dissolved in 1944.

An only child, she was brought up in a well-to-do home by parents who supported her educational aspirations. Her father was the brother of the Nobel prize winner Johannes V. Jensen and the women's rights activist Thit Jensen. After graduating from high school, she began to read medicine at the University of Copenhagen in 1919 but interrupted her studies when she married in 1923. She then devoted her attention to assisting her husband Hans Rask-Nielsen with his dissertation for a medical doctorate. Thereafter she helped him enthusiastically with his animal experiments, although the results were published only in his name.

Despite being upset by the divorce in 1944, Rask-Nielsen continued her studies, specializing in biology and graduating in 1945. She became an assistant at the university's Biological Institute, continued her experiments and published the results in her own name. Thanks to the support she received from her professor, the nutritionist Richard Ege, who understood her potential, she earned her doctorate in 1948 with a dissertation titled On the Development of Tumors in Various Tissues in Mice, Following Direct Application of a Carcinogenic Hydrocarbon.

Rask-Nielsen continued to conduct experimental leukemia research in the university's biology department, concentrating on anti-body producing tumors. She developed international contacts and made study trips to London and the United States. In 1963, the journal Nature published research showing that she was the first to prove the existence of viruses causing lymph node cancer in experiments with animals. In 1975, she received world recognition for her work when she was featured in the journal Cancer Research as one of the two European women who had had the greatest impact on basic medical-biological research in the 20th century.

Ragna Rask-Nielsen died in Copenhagen on 19 May 1998.
