= Dagmar Borup =

Danish pianist and music educator

- Born: 25 February 1867; Horsens, Denmark
- Died: 14 January 1959 (aged 91); Frederiksberg, Denmark
- Musical career
- Occupation(s): Musician, composer
- Instrument: Piano

Emilie Marie Dagmar Borup (née Alexandersen; 25 February 1867 – 14 January 1959) was a Danish pianist and music educator. She is remembered in particular for introducing ear training into the curriculum of the Royal Danish Academy of Music and related institutions. She adapted and expanded the approach she had learnt in Rome, Berlin and Paris by publishing textbooks and demonstrating it to students in Sweden and the Netherlands. Thanks to Borup, ear training became a key aspect of education offered by her students, including the organist Ebba Nielsen and the pianist Merete Westergaard.

== Biography ==
Born on 25 February 1867 in Horsens, Emilie Marie Dagmar Alexandersen was the daughter of the house painter Peder Alexandersen (1830–1904) and Helene Stockholm (1877–1896). Together with her two sisters, she was raised in a warm bourgeois home. After entering the Royal Academy in 1886, she met the violinist Julius Borup (1865–1938) whom she married in 1896. She also became a close friend of Carl Nielsen and his wife Anne Marie Carl-Nielsen. She was a fine pianist, frequently performing at concerts with her husband.

Borup had to abandon her career as a pianist when she began to suffer from a nerve disorder in her arms. When she was 58, she attended solfège classes at the Paris Conservatoire, drawing on the works of Albert Lavignac including Solfèges des solfèges. While the aural approach had been practised in schools, it had not been used in higher education. Borup succeeded in having it adopted by the Royal Danish Ballet school where she was teaching in 1927 and in 1930, she had it included in the curriculum of the Royal Music Academy where she taught from 1930 to 1936. She trained some 40 of her students in the aural method at the academy and used the ballet school as a practical setting for examining those who intended to become academics.

Dagmar Borup died in the Frederiksberg district of Copenhagen on 14 January 1959.

== Selected publications ==
- Borup, Dagmar (1963). Nye rytmiske Øvelser for Begyndere (in Danish). Skandinavisk Musikforlag.
- Borup, Dagmar (1928). Musikalske spørgsmaal og svar: noder, pauser : fortegn. og nodetrin for lærer og elev : 1 hefte (in Danish).
