= Valborg Hammerich =

Danish philanthropist

Valborg Hammerich née Rump (1897–1988) was a Danish philanthropist who in the 1930s established homes for needy women and children. During the German occupation (1940–1945), as a member of the Danske Kvinders Samfundstjeneste (Danish Women's Society Service) she helped to provide food and clothing for those suffering from lack of supplies. Together with other members of her family, from her house on the Hellerup sea front, she served the resistance by ferrying weapons and saboteurs between Denmark and Sweden and helping Jews to escape from the Nazis. Shortly before the end of the war, she established an organization for taking care of children inspired by the International Union for Child Welfare. It later became known as "Red Barnet", the Danish arm of Save the Children.

== Biography ==
Born on 10 October 1897 in Copenhagen, Valborg Rump was the daughter of the engineer Johannes Christian Magnus Rump (1861–1932) and his wife Sophie Mariane Elisabeth née Villemoës (1870–1931). In 1918 she married the naval officer Kai Hammerich with whom she had eight children: Johannes (1919), Karen (1921), Peter (1922), Kai Ole (1924), Paul (1927), Vivi (1934), Else (1936) and Niels (1944).

Although Rump had been brought up by a father who was more interested in politics than religion, after her marriage she adopted her husband's faith, soon joining the charity organization Kirkens Korshær (Church Crusade). She contributed to their cause by creating women's homes, orphanages and summer recreation camps. During the German occupation she became a board member of the Danish Women's Social Service where she participated in providing food and clothing for those disadvantaged by lack of supplied. In particular, she took part in resistance activities under the pseudonym Vera Hansen. Thanks to her house on the sea front in Hellerup, she was able to help ferrying weapons and arranging for Jews to escape by boat to Sweden. Towards the end of the war, Hammerich took the initiative to establish an organization to save orphaned children which later became known as "Red Barnet".

During the Korean War (1951–1953), while her husband headed the hospital ship MS Jutlandia, Hammerich served in a Korean hospital close to the front. After the war, she devoted her time to organizing child care for Eastern European children through the Church Crusade.

Valborg Hammerich died in Copenhagen on 17 December 1988. She is buried in Bispebjerg Cemetery.
