= Marichen Nielsen =

Danish politician (1921–2014)

Marichen Johanne Nielsen née Flade (1921–2014) was a Danish politician. Representing the Social Democrats, she was a member of the Danish Parliament (Folketing) for the Aarhus Constituency from September 1971 to December 1973. In January 1973, she was the first Danish woman to become a member of the European Parliament. From 1974 she represented Denmark's Labour Movement on the European Economic and Social Committee. In parallel, until her retirement in 1986, she was a consultant on the Aarhus City Council.

== Early life, education and family ==
Born on 18 February 1921 in Aabenraa, Marichen Johanne Flade was the daughter of the mason W. Flade (1890–1966) and his wife Erna née Blumstok who was an active Social Democrat member of the Aabenraa Town Council. After completing her Realskole education in 1938, she trained as a bank employee. In March 1947, she married the editor Kristian Nielsen with whom she had three children: Lisbeth (1948), Kristian (1951) and Niels (1952).

== Career ==
On leaving school, she was employed at the Aabenraa branch of Denmark's Handelsbank, where she remained until 1943. She then became active as an instructor at the Social Democrats' youth organization De Unges Idræt (DUI). After her wedding in 1947, she moved with her husband to Roskilde.

In 1952, after her husband was engaged by the newspaper Demokraten, the family moved to Aarhus where Marichen Nielsen became increasingly involved in Social Democratic activities under the auspices of the local women's committee. In 1962, she was hired as the party's local travel secretary with a mandate to encourage women in the area, especially housewives, to become more interested in the Social Democratic movement. Thanks to her involvement, quite a number entered politics. She continued in the position until 1967 although she grew tired of the strain travel put on her own relations with her family.

Nielsen was elected to the Folketing for the Aarhus Constituency from September 1971 to December 1973. In January 1973, she was the first Danish woman to become a member of the European Parliament. From 1974 she represented Denmark's Labour Movement on the European Economic and Social Committee. Nielsen was engaged by Aarhus Municipality as care consultant in 1976 where she remained until her retirement in 1986.

Marichen Nielsen died in the Aabyhoj district of Aarhus on 8 April 2014, aged 93.
