= Ulla Terkelsen =

Danish journalist

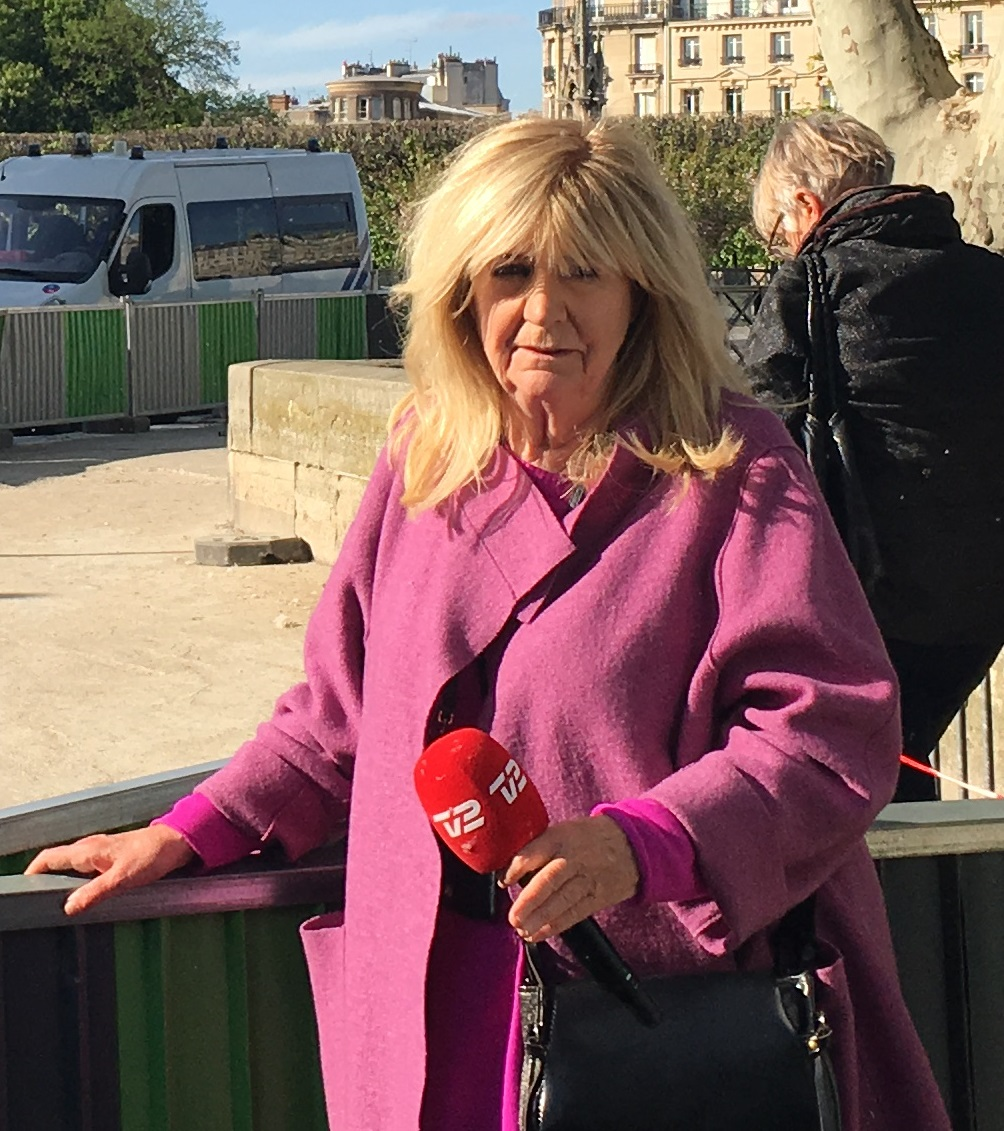
- Terkelsen in 2019
- Born: Ulla Staalby; May 15, 1944 (age 82); Aarhus, Denmark
- Occupation: Journalist
- Years active: 1967–present
- Employer: TV2 (1987–present)
- Television: Danmarks Radio reporter (1978–1984); TV2 anchor (1987–present)
- Spouses: Svend Terkelsen (m. 1963; div. 1965) Guy Patrick Hawtin (m. 1967; div. 1969)
- Children: Nicholas Hawtin (son)
- Awards: TV Prisen (2003); Journalistpris (2005); Publicistprisen (2007)

Ulla Terkelsen (née Staalby) (born 15 May 1944) is a Danish news journalist from Aarhus and Copenhagen. She is widely best known as an established foreign correspondent for TV2.

Now living in Cannes, France, Terkelsen continues to report on foreign affairs from her balcony. Terkelsen speaks fluent Danish, Norwegian, Swedish, English, German, French, and Polish.

== Early life, education, and marriage ==
Ulla Staalby was born on 15 May 1944 in Aarhus, Denmark, to her parents, Else and Holger Staalby. She was baptized in Saint Paul's Church.

As a student, Terkelsen attended Aarhus Katedralskole in 1963, and also combined with study at the University of Warsaw in Warsaw, Poland from 1963 to 1964. She was educated at Demokraten in Aarhus from 1964 to 1967.

In 1963, while graduated, she married Svend Terkelsen, a student of literature and moved with him to Poland where he continued his studies. While there, she gained her first experience of journalism working for the Polish radio's Danish service. After her first marriage was dissolved, she returned to Aarhus, where she became as an apprentice with a local newspaper, Demokraten (1967).

In 1967, Terkelsen married Guy Patrick Hawtin, with whom she have a son, Nicholas Hawtin (born 1968), her only child. Unfortunately, they officially divorced in 1971.

== Career ==
Thanks to her talent as a young apprentice, Terkelsen was honoured with an award from an agricultural organization Landbrugsraadet which allowed her to travel to London. While there she met Guy, also a journalist, who became her husband for the next four years. Together they had a son, Nicholas.

In London, she was a freelance journalist, frequently working for Danmarks Radio from 1978 to 1984. She went on to work from Washington D.C. and Kabul. Since 1987, she has been employed by TV 2 where she helped to create the channel's news programmes.

Today Terkelsen is based in Cannes although she still travels to other news hot spots but now 80, she flies less frequently than she used to. Many of her news reports are transmitted from her balcony in Cannes. In her own words: "I feel that I am still involved in what interests me, namely what is happening in the world, and that I can still translate it into journalism. I consider that to be a very great gift."
