= Mimi Carstensen =

Danish philanthropist and journalist

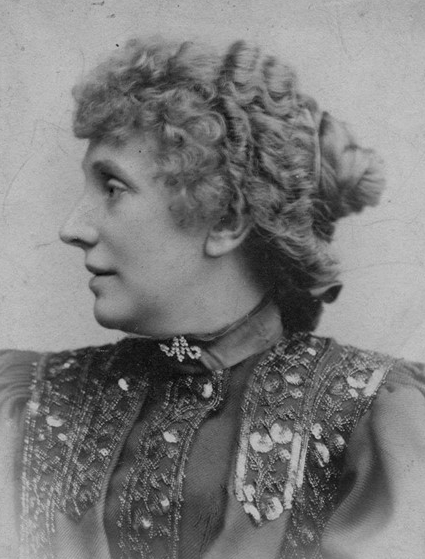
Mimi Carstensen (1896)

Johanne Caroline Vilhelmine (Mimi) Carstensen, née Nielsen, (1852–1935) was a Danish philanthropist and a pioneering woman journalist. She is remembered for her lifelong leadership of the Louise Society (Louiseforeningen) which was founded in 1906 to provide financial support to needy single women. As early as 1887 she was one of very few women to embark on a career as a journalist, becoming editor of Damernes Blad in 1898 and of Louiseforeningens Blad from 1916 until she died in 1935.

== Biography ==
Born on 25 January 1852 in Charlottenlund to the north of Copenhagen, Johanne Caroline Vilhelmine Nielsen was the daughter of the restaurateur Christian Nielsen (1809–1886) and his wife Bergine née Nyberg (1817–1887). In 1872, she married the merchant Carl Frederik Budde-Lund with whom she had a daughter, Asta (1874). After his death in 1848, she married the editor Hans Carl Emil Carstensen (1837–1922).

In addition to her education at Ordrup School, Mimi Nielsen received private tuition. After her husband died in 1848, she was left to care for her daughter. Preferring to lead her own life rather than returning to her parents, in 1882 she found employment in the administration of the newly founded telephone company Kjøbenhavns Telefon Aktieselskab.

In 1887, after marrying Carl Carstensen who was a newspaper editor, she turned to journalism. As one of the first Danish women to become a newspaper correspondent, she wrote articles for Nationaltidende inspired by her connections with high society and became one of the few female members of the Journalists' Society (Journalistforeningen). She contributed not only to Dagens Nyheder and Nationaltidende but also to Frou-Four, one of the first women's magazines in Denmark. From 1898 to 1902, she was editor of Damernes Blad.

In 1906, she helped to establish the philanthropic Louise Society, becoming its chair in 1910 for the rest of her life. The foundation collected and distributed discarded clothing and footwear from wealthy women to upper-class women who had run into financial difficulties.

Mimi Carstensen died in Copenhagen on 13 May 1935.
