= Ane Høgsberg =

Danish stand-up comedian

Ane Høgsberg (born 1988) is a Danish stand-up comedian. Performing since 2008, she won the talent prize at the Danish Zulu Comedy Galla in 2016 and appeared in her first solo show in 2017. As a comedy writer, Høgsberg has contributed to TV shows for the Danish TV channel TV 2, including Nørgaards Netfix and City Singler.

== Biography ==
Raised in Tønder in Southern Jutland, Høgsberg has been performing as a stand-up comedian since 2008. Together with her colleague Mads Holm, in 2015 she put together Det store depressionsshow (The Great Depression Show). In 2016, she won the Talent Award at the Zulu Comedy Galla and went on to host the Danish Stand-up Championships the following year. She appeared in her first solo show, Dårlig Feminist (Bad Feminist), in early 2017, followed two years later by another one-woman show Døden har en årsag (Death Has a Cause). As a comedy writer, she has contributed to Nørgaards Netfix and to the show City Singler.

Hosted by Høgsberg, the comedy series, Alle hader feminister (Everyone Hates Feminists) was broadcast on the Danish TV channel DR2 in the summer of 2020. While the show was generally well received, especially by schoolgirls, Høgsberg was upset by a number of threats and hate messages she received.

In 2022, Høgsberg appeared in the comedy series on TV2 Fuhlendorff og de skøre riddere with Christian Fuhlendorff who also assisted her with her solo shows.

Høgsberg and her partner, the comedian Lasse Madsen had a son, Ebbe, in December 2020.
