= Søren Ryge Petersen =

Danish television host

Søren Ryge
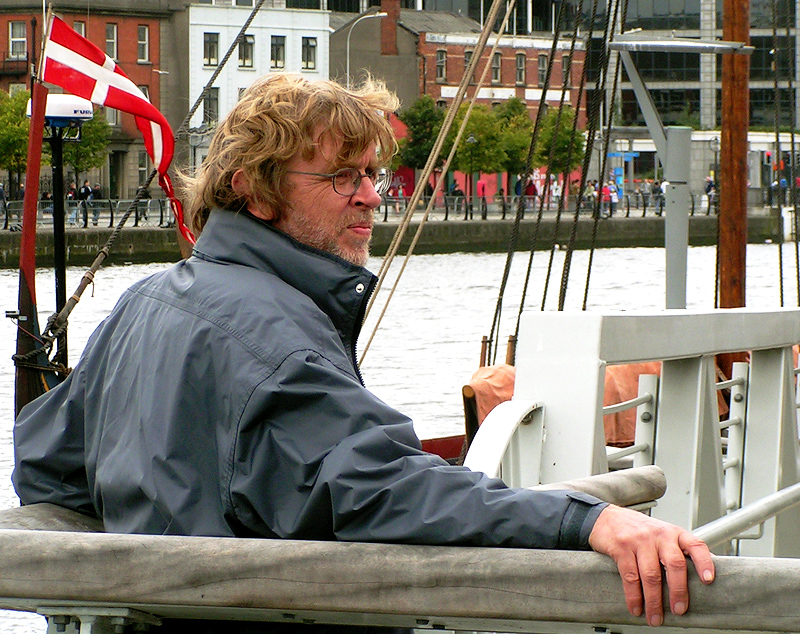
- Søren Ryge Petersen in Dublin preparing a TV documentary about the replica Viking ship Havhingsten fra Glendalough and its six-week-long journey from Roskilde to Dublin in the summer of 2007
- Born: July 31, 1945 (age 80)
- Occupations: Television presenter, journalist, writer

Søren Ryge Petersen is a Danish television presenter, journalist, and writer.

Born in Gram, South Denmark, on 31 July 1945, Petersen grew up some 50 km further south in Achtrup, Schleswig-Holstein.

The holder of an M.A. in Danish language from Aarhus University, he is a self-taught horticulturalist and was editor from 1978 to 1990 of the magazine Haven ("The Garden") published by The Danish Garden Society. He has also written for the leading daily newspaper Politiken.

Petersen began working for the Danish national broadcasting corporation DR in 1977, and in 1988 got his own show on DR television: DR Derude ("Out There"), a gardening programme in which a camera crew followed him around his own garden at Djursland as he demonstrated how he looked after it and talked about the flowers and crop plants it contained. In 1992, the programme went live under the name of DR Derude Direkte, later renamed Søren Ryge. Edition number 100 was broadcast on 6 August 2008 and presented a series of clips from the earlier shows.

As well as DR Derude, Søren Ryge Petersen has made a series of other programmes for DR, presenting the nature of the world and its people, with particular emphasis on the portrayal of people living simple lives.

== Bibliography ==
- Dansk eller tysk, 1975 (ISBN 87-980193-2-5)
- Landet og året, 1995 (ISBN 87-00-22454-5)
- Historier fra Danmark, 1998 (ISBN 87-00-63192-2)
- Spørg Søren, 2001 (ISBN 87-567-6559-2)
- Fortællinger fra et tv-liv, 2001 (ISBN 87-7953-008-7)
- I haven, 2002 (ISBN 87-11-11549-1)
