= Merete Gerlach-Nielsen =

Danish academic and Unesco official

Merete Gerlach-Nielsen (1933–2019) was a Danish-born French-language academic, UNESCO's coordinating director for women's affairs (1988–1990), and one of the founders of Kvinfo, the Danish Centre for Research on Women and Gender. In 1997, she acquired French nationality.

== Biography ==
Born on 16 August 1933 in Copenhagen, Merete Gerlach-Nielsen was the daughter of Carl Gerlach-Nielsen (1901–1991) and Louise Fanøe (1908–1987). She was raised as an only child in an internationally oriented home in which her father was attached to the Alliance Française while her mother was an officer in the Home Guard. As a child, Gerlach-Nielsen was influenced by her godmother Margrethe Spies who introduced her to the theatre and to literature and shared her concern for gender equality and women's affairs.

Gerlach-Nielsen attended Copenhagen's French School and matriculated from Christianshavns Gymnasium in 1951. She went on to graduate as Cand.mag. in French and Danish at Copenhagen University in 1960. In parallel, she increased her interest in the Alliance Française, becoming secretary in 1957 and chair in 1978 for a successful two-year period. While at university, she headed the French student association Le Coq, for which she was rewarded with the Alliance's bronze medal in 1983.

In the mid-1980s, she was one of the most active women behind the founding of the Danish Centre for Research on Women and Gender (Kvinfo), becoming chair of the management board for 1987–1988. In 1988, she became one of the highly placed women in the United Nations organizations when she was selected among 800 candidates to be the coordinating director for women's affairs at the Paris-based UNESCO headquarters.

In 1990, she retired from the post, choosing to work freelance in Paris. On 26 December 1997, she acquired French nationality. Merete Gerlach-Nielsen died in Paris on 14 June 2019.

== Publications ==
Gerlach-Nielsen's publications include:

- 1965: Stendhal, théoricien et romancier de l'amour, Munksgaard (in French)
- 1968: Romanproblemer. Teorier og analyser. Festskrift til Hans Sørensen den 28. september 1968, Odense Universitetsforlag (in Danish)
- 1977: Romanteori og romananalyse, Odense Universitetsforlag (in Danish)
- 1980: New trends in the Danish women's movement, 1970-1978, Emmeline Press
- 1985: L'Alliance française de Copenhague a cent ans 1884-1984 (in French)

== Awards ==
In addition to numerous scholarships, Gerlach-Nielsen was decorated with the Ordre des Palmes académiques in 1998.
