= Mette Lange =

Danish architect

Mette Lange is a Danish architect. A graduate of the Royal Danish Academy of Fine Arts in 1990, she divides her time between Denmark and India. She has received awards and recognition for her outstanding design of villas and vacation houses in Denmark and the mobile schools she has designed for nomad children in Goa.

== Biography ==
Born in Gentofte to the north of Copenhagen, she graduated in 1990. In 2002, she established her own studio, Mette Lange Architects. She now divides her time between Denmark, where she spends the summers, and Goa in India where she lives and works in the winter.

Her practice in Denmark specializes in vacation houses and villas placed in the extraordinary Danish nature. Her code of conduct is to work in close contact with the client and the site while combining dreams, needs and everyday life. Working in close harmony with nature, light, materials and sustainability she has been awarded with several prices. Together with architect Michael Lynge Jensen she runs her Copenhagen-based office. Their small size office has allowed them to create a practice with unique methods for designing beautiful architecture. Together with carpenter Christian Rejnhold she has developed a modular house called Mini House, which allows clients to buy a relatively inexpensive but well designed vacation house.

Her main occupation in Goa, has been the MovingSchool project, founded by Anders Linnet in 2001, under which she has created floating classrooms and classrooms on wheels for the children of the migrant workers. Mette Lange is now chairman of Moving School.

Besides working in Denmark and India, Mette Lange has also designed houses in Iran, Sri Lanka and Iceland.

Mette Lange has received several prices for her phenomenal architecture: In 2010, Lange received a Nykredit's Motivational Prize of DKK 100,000 for the Moving Schools Project which was seen as making an important contribution to social sustainability. In 2013, for her schools in India she also received a grant from the Henning Larsen Foundation. In 2017 she received Halldor Gunnløgssons Fonds Award which included facilitating a competition for all students at the Royal Danish Academy of Architecture. In 2018 she was given the Eckersberg Medallion.
