= Elisa Ussing =

Danish lawyer

Edele Elisa Minona Ussing (1885–1949) was a pioneering Danish female lawyer. In 1920, she became the first woman to serve as a legal substitute in the Estate Tax Office (Lenskontoret) and in 1933, accepting a temporary assignment, was the first woman to serve as a judge in the Østre Landsret, one of Denmark's two high courts. She was officially appointed an Østre Landsret judge in 1939.

== Biography ==
Born on 9 June 1885 in Alexandria, Egypt, Edele Elisa Minona Ussing was the daughter of the judge Carl Johannes Ussing (1854–96) and Ebba Margrethe Puggaard (1856–1910). Thanks to her father, who served as a judge in the Mixed Courts of Egypt, she was encouraged to enter the legal profession. After matriculating from N. Zahle's School in Copenhagen in 1904, she studied law at the University of Copenhagen, graduating in 1909 as one of just two female students.

After a short period serving as a legal proxy, in 1910 she was engaged by the Ministry of Justice as a temporary assistant, officially becoming an assistant the following year. From 1915 to 1922, she served as a secretary in the Estate Tax Office (Lenskontoret) and in 1920 became the woman to be recognized as a legal proxy at the ministry.

Ussing was also active on the political front. In 1917, representing the Conservative People's Party, she became a candidate for the municipal elections in the Copenhagen district of Frederiksberg, standing for the parliamentary elections in 1918 and 1920. She was also a member of Frederiksberg's electoral committee (1916–23) and of the Danish Women's Conservative Association (1918–21). From 1914 to 1917, she served on the board of the Women Readers' Association and from 1918 to 1923 on that of the Danish Women's Society.

In 1923, she was appointed deputy chair of Copenhagen's children's welfare council (værgerådet) where she served for ten years. In 1933, she was entrusted with a temporary appointment as a judge in the Østre Landsret, one of Denmark's two high courts. As it was the first time a female lawyer had filled such a high position, it led to considerable attention in the press. In 1939, she was officially appointed an Østre Landsret judge, becoming a presiding judge in 1945. She held the post for the remainder of her life.

Elisa Ussing died in Frederksberg on 7 March 1949. She is buried in Hørsholm Cemetery.
