= Caroline Kellermann =

Danish ballet dancer

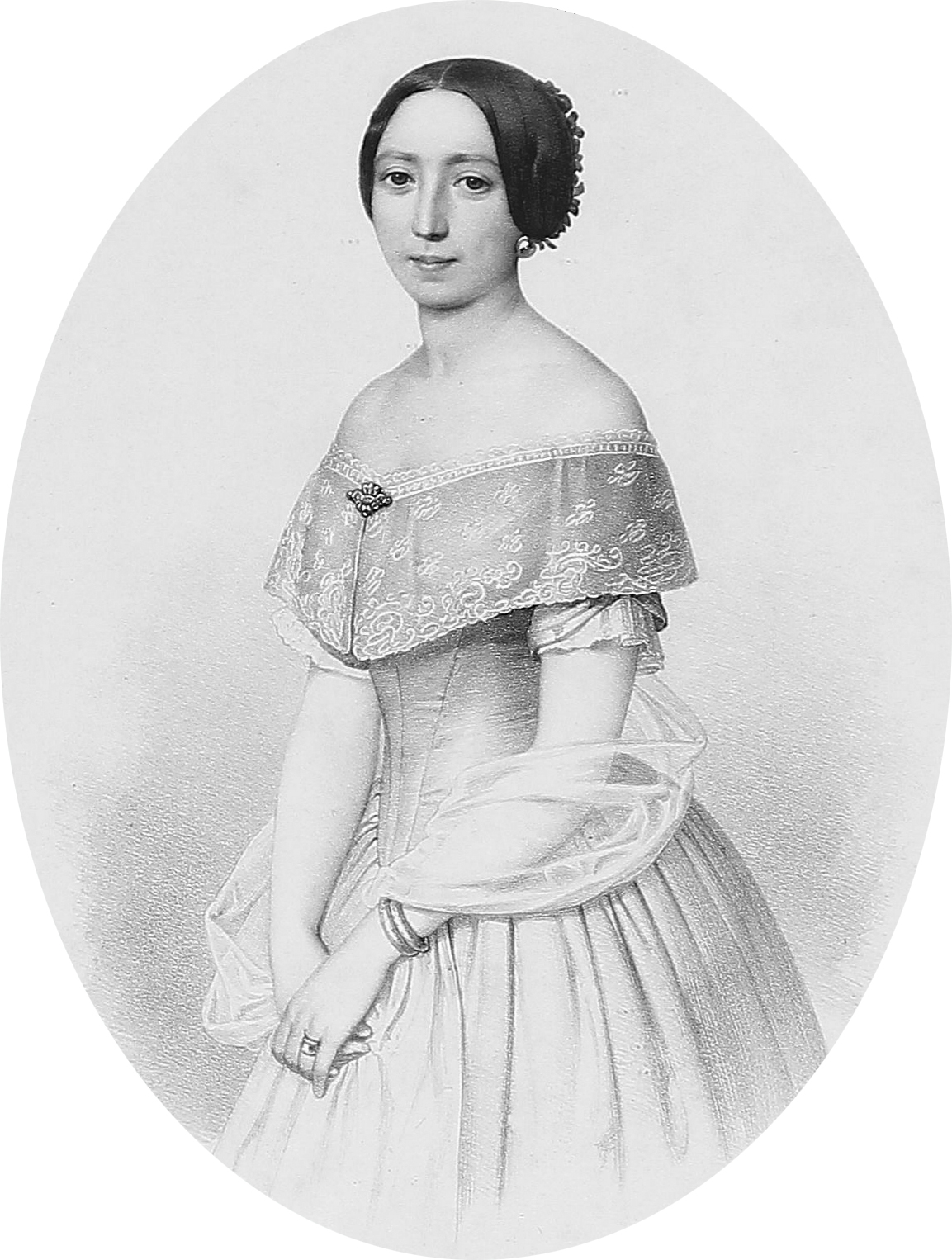
Caroline Kellermann

Caroline Wilhelmine Kellermann (1821–1881) was a Danish ballerina who danced at the Royal Danish Theatre under August Bournonville. She was a contemporary of Lucile Grahn-Young and Augusta Nielsen, both of whom were considered superior dancers and more attractive figures, but Kellermann excelled in roles requiring the use of mime such as Teresina in Napoli.

== Biography ==
Born on 26 February 1821 in Copenhagen, Caroline Wilhelmine Fjeldsted was the daughter of Rasmus Hansen Fjeldsted (1784–1847) and Cornelia Wilhelmine Charlotte Lefland (1793–1864). On 26 September 1849, she married the cellist Christian Kellermann who died in 1866.

Along with Grahn-Young and Nielsen, she was one of Bournonville's three preferred students after he became director of the Royal Danish Ballet in 1935. Kellermann debuted as Fatme in Brama og Bayaderen and was promoted to solo dancer in 1840 after Grahn-Young left the country in 1839. For the next ten years, she shared the principal roles with Nielsen, dancing Maria in Toréadoren (1840), Margaretha in Faust (1842) and Eliza in Konservatoriet (1949). She was also successful when she danced in Stockholm in 1939 and Christiania in 1940. Nielsen retired in 1849, leaving Kellermann to enjoy a successful career until 1861.

Caroline Kellermann died on 20 May 1881 in the Copenhagen district of Frederiksberg.
