= Lucie Marie Reventlow =

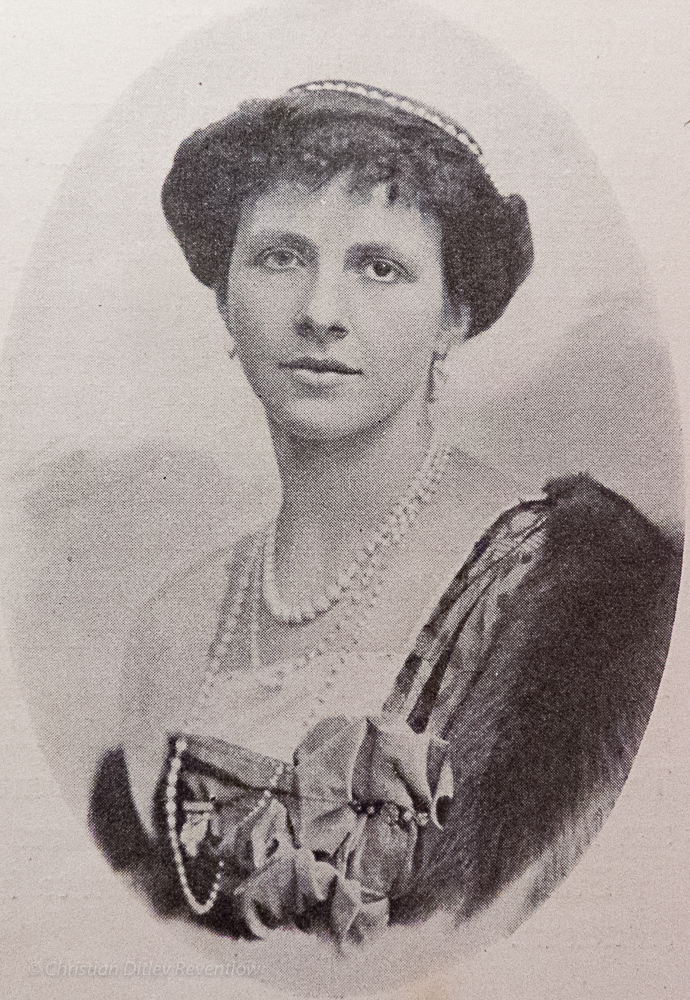
Lucie Marie Reventlow

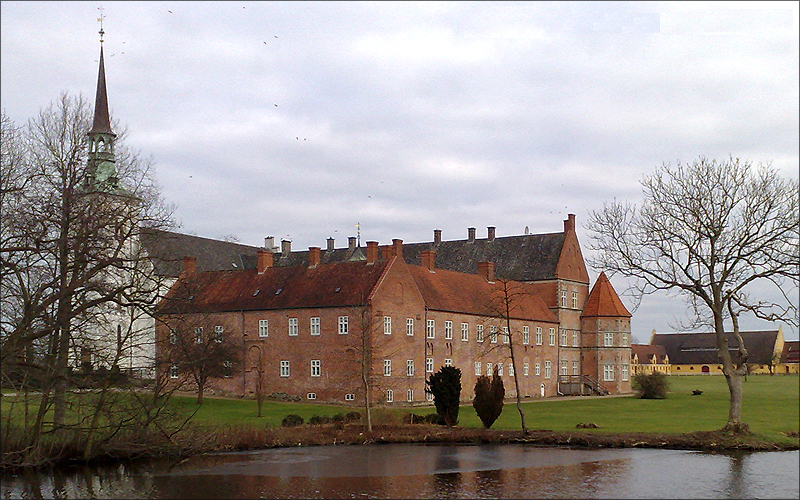
Brahetrolleborg Manor

Lucie Marie Ludovika Anastasia Adelheid Karola Hedwig Reventlow (1884–1984) was a German-born Danish philanthropist who is remembered for supporting the scout movement in Denmark. In particular, she adapted her home, Brahetrolleborg Manor on the island of Funen, as a scouting school. In addition, she created a housekeeping school on the premises. After spending the Second World War in England, where she served in the Air Raid Precautions, she returned to Brahetrolleborg, upholding its historical traditions until she died, almost 100 years old.

== Biography ==
Born on 24 October 1884 in Züllichau, Germany (now Sulechów, Poland), Lucie Marie Ludovika Anastasia Adelheid Karola Hedwig Reventlow was the daughter of Count Eberhard Carl Paul Erdmann Emanuel Haugwitz Hardenberg Reventlow (1850–1931) and Catinka Elisabeth Maximiliane Georgine von Pappenheim (1859–1906). She was raised in an aristocratic family by a father who was an officer in the German army with connections in Italy and Denmark. In 1909, she married Lensgreve Christian Einar Reventlow, one of Denmark's largest landowners with his Brahetrolleborg estate in southern Funen. It was his second marriage. Together they had two daughters and also a son, Christian, who died at the age of 16.

After the end of the First World War, Lucie Marie Reventlow helped to care for the unfortunate Viennese children who came to Denmark after suffering from the breakup of Austria-Hungary. She also cared for her father who had come to Denmark in 1919 after losing his German estate together with his younger daughter, her sister Naka Haugwitz (1887–1948), who unlike her mother had recovered from tuberculosis when she was 18.

Thanks to her sister's involvement, Reventlow participated in the Danish Girl Guides (Det Danske Pigespejderkorps), becoming head of the board from 1921 to 1933. In 1922, in collaboration with Elisabeth Flagstad ( (1894–1938), she helped to establish the Danish scouting school (Spejderskolen) at Brahetrolleborg, renovating the foresters' quarters and providing suitable furniture to house 24 students. The premises were also used as a housekeeping school which proved so popular that it had to move into larger premises at the nearby village of Korinth. Thanks to Reventlow's support, the Brahetrolleborg-Korinth facility functioned as the focus of girl scouting activities in Denmark until 1988 when it became an "efterskole" with an emphasis on scouting.

Despite the financial difficulties which resulted following her husband's death in 1929, Reventlow continued to maintain Brahetrolleborg after selling off other properties. She also assisted with the conversion of the Pederstrup estate on Lolland into the Reventlow Museum in memory of the statesman Christian Ditlev Frederik Reventlow (1748–1827).

During the Second World War, Reventlow went to England, where in 1940 she married the British officer Bertram James Walker. She served in the Air Raid Precautions, receiving a medal for her support. After Walker died in 1947, she returned to Denmark, where she lived in Brahetrolleborg Manor for the rest of her life, upholding local traditions dating back to the 18th century.

Lucie Marie Reventlow died in Fåborg on 20 April 1984, almost 100 years old. She is buried in Theofili Skov near Vesterborg, Lolland.
