= Karen Horsens =

Danish Lutheran dean (1932–2022)

- Dean in the Church of Denmark
- Church: Church of Denmark

Personal details
- Born: 18 September 1932 Aalborg, Denmark
- Died: 4 March 2022 (aged 89)
- Denomination: Lutheranism
- Education: Aalborg Cathedral School; Aarhus University

Karen Horsens (18 September 1932 – 4 March 2022) was a Danish Christian minister. In 1981, she became the first woman to be a dean of the Church of Denmark when she was appointed to the cathedral provostship of Roskilde where she served until her retirement in 1998.

== Biography ==
Born on 18 September 1932 in Aalborg, Karen Horsens was one of the three daughters of the bicycle retailer Alfred Horsens (1897–1971) and Karla Kristensen (1900–1989). On matriculating from Aalborg Cathedral School in 1951, she decided to study theology which at the time was an unusual choice for a girl. In 1957, she became the first woman theologian to receive Aalborg University's gold medal for a dissertation on Bishop Peder Madsen. On graduating as Cand.theol. in 1958, she continued her studies abroad, first in Oslo and later in New York on a fellowship from the American Association of University Women.

In 1962, she was appointed a chaplain at the Church of Our Saviour in Copenhagen. It was here she met the organist Charley Olsen whom she married in 1968. They have one son together, Rasmus. She remained at the church for 20 years, becoming the parish priest in 1972.

Horsens became a board member of the clerical association Den Danske Præsteforening in 1974, becoming its chair from 1978 to 1982. She was an effective leader, campaigning for better salaries and working conditions for priests. In 1990, she published her sermons, which have since been frequently cited.

Following her husband's death in 2011, Horsens lived as a widow in a small pensioner's home close to Roskilde Cathedral. She died on 4 March 2022, at the age of 89.

== Awards ==
In 1986, Horsens was honoured as a Knight of the Order of the Dannebrog and in 1992 as a Knight 1st Class.
