= Julie Ramsing =

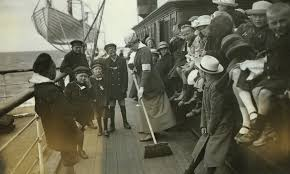
Julie Ramsing with German holiday children (c. 1919)

Julie Frederikke Ramsing née Vallentin (1871–1954) was a Danish pacifist, feminist and philanthropist who is remembered above all for organizing three-month convalescence trips to Denmark for malnourished German children after the end of the First World War. As chair of the Committee for Schleswig Children's Holiday Trips from 1919 to 1948, every year she arranged for children from Southern Schleswig to stay with families in the Danish countryside. She also contributed much to maintaining the cultural identity of Danish families living in Germany.

== Biography ==
Born on 12 September 1871 in Aalborg, Julie Frederikke Vallentin was the daughter of the merchant Poul Georg Vallentin (1840–1905) and his wife Johanne Marie née Bay (1852–1924). In January 1895, she married Holger Utke Ramsing (1868–1946), an army officer, and moved with him to the Danish West Indies where he was stationed. While there, the couple had three children: Estrid (1895), Inger (1897) and Erik (1898).

On returning to Denmark around the turn of the century, Ramsing who had taken an active interest in the colony's local craftmanship, served on the committee of the 1900 West Indies Exhibition where she was responsible for the handicrafts section. Similarly, in 1905, she participated in the large Danish Colonial Exhibition in Tivoli. She had also helped with the training of women from the Danish West Indies who attended the courses of the Danish Handicraft Association (Dansk Kunstflidsforening) organized by Emma Gad. She also played an active part in various initiatives in subsequent years to improve nursing and child care in the West Indies in connection with the Red Cross but these ceased shortly after the islands were sold to the United States in 1917.

As a member, and later chair, of the Danish Women's Defence Association (Danske Kvinders Forsvarsforening) she developed an interest in South Jutland and the related reunification process. After the German collapse at the end of the First World War, in 1919 she took a leading role in organizing convalescence trips to Denmark for some 10,000 malnourished German children. As a result of damaged railway tracks, they were ferried to Denmark by sea to spend three months on farms in the Danish countryside. They were able to recover their strength, enjoy a long holiday and discover the Danish way of life. As chair of the Committee for Schleswig Children's Holiday Trips (Komiteen for slesvigske Børns Ferierejser) from 1919 to 1948, every year she continued to arrange for children from Southern Schleswig to stay with families in Denmark. As a co-founder of the Flensburg Society (Flensborg-Samfundet) in 1920, she contributed much to maintaining the cultural identity of Danish families living in Germany. After the death of her husband in 1946, she chaired the organization.

Julie Ramsing died in Gentofte on 17 March 1954.

== Awards ==
Ramsing was awarded the Royal Medal of Recompense (gold) in 1934 and the Medal of Merit (gold) in 1949.
