= Olrik =

Olrik may refer to:

- Olrik Fjord, a fjord in Avannaata municipality, Greenland
- Colonel Olrik, a character from the Blake and Mortimer comic series

== People with the surname ==
- Dagmar Olrik (1860–1932), Danish painter and tapestry artist.
- Henrik Olrik (1830–1890), Danish painter and sculptor
- Christian Søren Marcus Olrik (1815–1870), Royal Inspector of North Greenland
