= Karen Hannover =

Danish ceramist

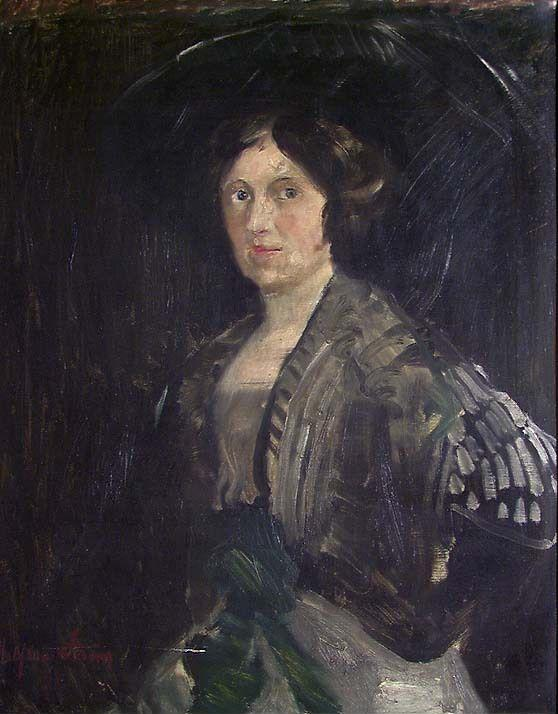
Halfdan Strøm - Portrait of Karen Hannover - NG.M.01831 - National Museum of Art, Architecture and Design

Karen Anna Hannover née Topsøe (1872–1943) was a Danish ceramist. With no formal education in art, while in Paris in 1892–94, she was inspired to take an interest in culture by her aunt, the painter Anna Petersen. This led to contacts with the artist Jens Ferdinand Willumsen and the poet Sophus Claussen. In 1897, she married the art historian Emil Hannover who took a special interest in ceramics. After spending several years raising a family, in 1910 she began to experiment with ceramics, participating in Landsforeningen Dansk Kunsthaandværk's exhibition at the Museum of Decorative Art in 1912. Thanks to her concern for quality, she went on to create white glazed faience works, sparsely tinted in green. Her jars and bowls were decorated with leafy vines, flowers and fruits, in some cases taking the form of fruits themselves.

== Early life ==
Born in Copenhagen on 27 October 1872, Karen Anna Topsøe was the daughter of the novelist Vilhelm Christian Sigurd Topsøe (1840–1881) and Augusta Pauline Kirstine Petersen (1846–1901). The second of three children, she grew up in a well-to-do cultural milieu. After the early death of her father in 1881, she was raised by her mother. In 1892, she graduated from N. Zahle's School and passed the Examen philosophicum the following year.

== Career ==
That autumn, she moved with her mother and sister Ingeborg to Paris where her aunt, the painter Anna Petersen, had already settled. As a result, she became acquainted with many of the Danish and Scandinavian artists who had been attracted to the city, in particular the sculptor Jens Ferdinand Willumsen, the writer Herman Bang and the poet Sophus Claussen. After only two months, Claussen fell hopelessly in love with her. Although she rejected his marriage proposal in late 1893, he continued to write to her and met her frequently when she returned to Denmark in 1894. The romance is reflected in his writings.

In May 1897, Karen Topsøe married the art historian Emil Viggo Hannover who later became a museum director. Their home attracted many cultural figures, including the art historian Karl Madsen, the painter Johan Rohde and the couple Agnes and Harald Slott-Møller.

After a number of years raising her children, in 1910 when the youngest daughter was five, she began working with the faience pottery produced at Ipsen's Terracotta Factory. She experimented with thick tin-glazing in greyish white tones as in her lidded dish (Laagfad, 1913) and flowered bowl (Blomsterskaal 1919). Inspired by techniques from the Renaissance and Rococo periods, her personalized style is reflected in her naturalistic decorations of fruits and flowers. Some works represent the fruits themselves, for example Pineapple and Artichoke (Ananas og Artiskok, 1923).

In 1996, Hannover's work was included in Vejen Art Museum's exhibition "De frie Billedhuggere". Thereafter the museum acquired several additional works which have been on display since 2010.

Karen Hannover died in Copenhagen on 30 January 1943 and is buried in Vestre Cemetery.
