= Rosengården 7 =

Listed building in Copenhagen

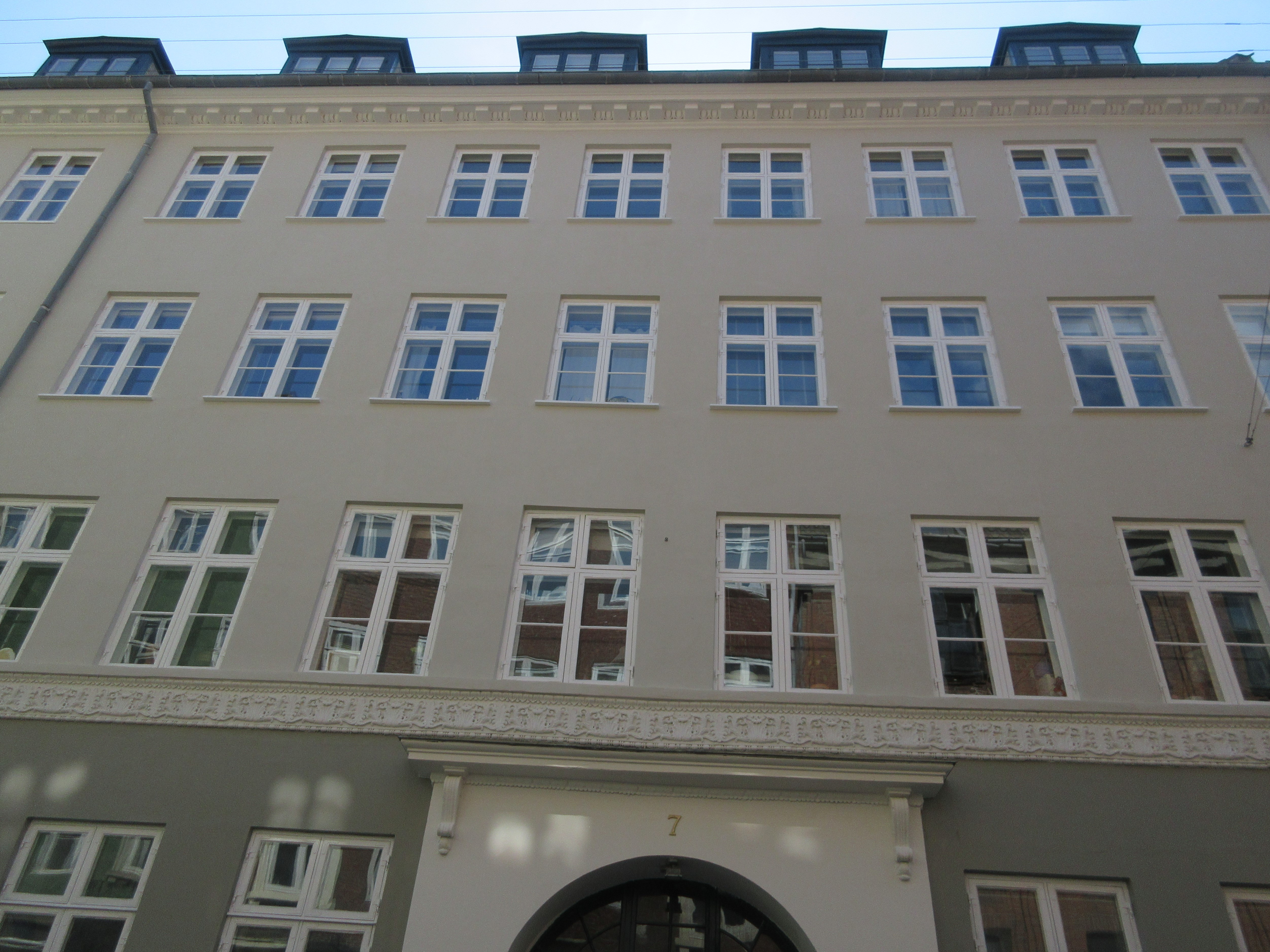
- Interactive map of the Rosengården 7 area

General information
- Location: Copenhagen, Denmark
- Coordinates: 55°40′55.92″N 12°34′22.44″E
- Completed: 1845

Rosengården 7 is a mid 19th-century property situated in the street Rosengården, between Kyltorvet and the shopping street Strøget, in the Old Town of Copenhagen, Denmark. It was constructed in 1844– for Johan Christian Culmsee, a master saddler and later owner of Havreholm Paper Mill at Helsingør. The building was listed in the Danish registry of protected buildings and places in 193+. The neighboring building at Rosengården 5 was also constructed for Culmsee.

== History ==
=== 18th century ===
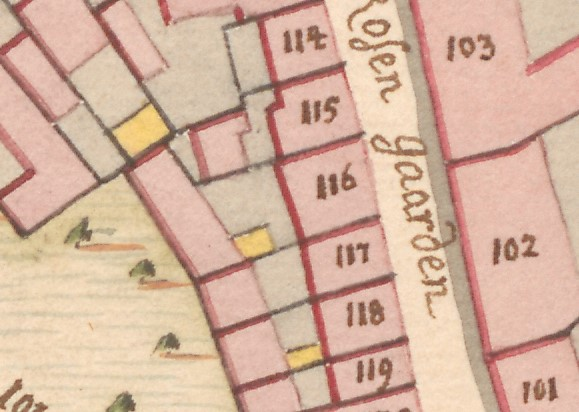
No. 116 and No. 117 seen on a detail from Christian Gedde's map of Klædebo Quarter, 1757.

The site was formerly made up of two smaller properties. The eastern of these properties was listed in the new cadastre of 1756 as No. 116 in Klædebo Quarter, owned by beer seller (øltapper David Christensen. The western property was listed as No. 117 in Klædebo Quarter, owned by owned by grocer (høker) Anders Madsen.

The old No. 117 was listed in the new cadastre of 1806 as No. 116, owned by Jacob Borgvardt. The old No. 116 was listed in the new cadastre of 1806 as No. 117 and was also owned by Jacob Borgwardt. The two properties were formally as No. 116 & 117.

=== Culmsee and the new building ===
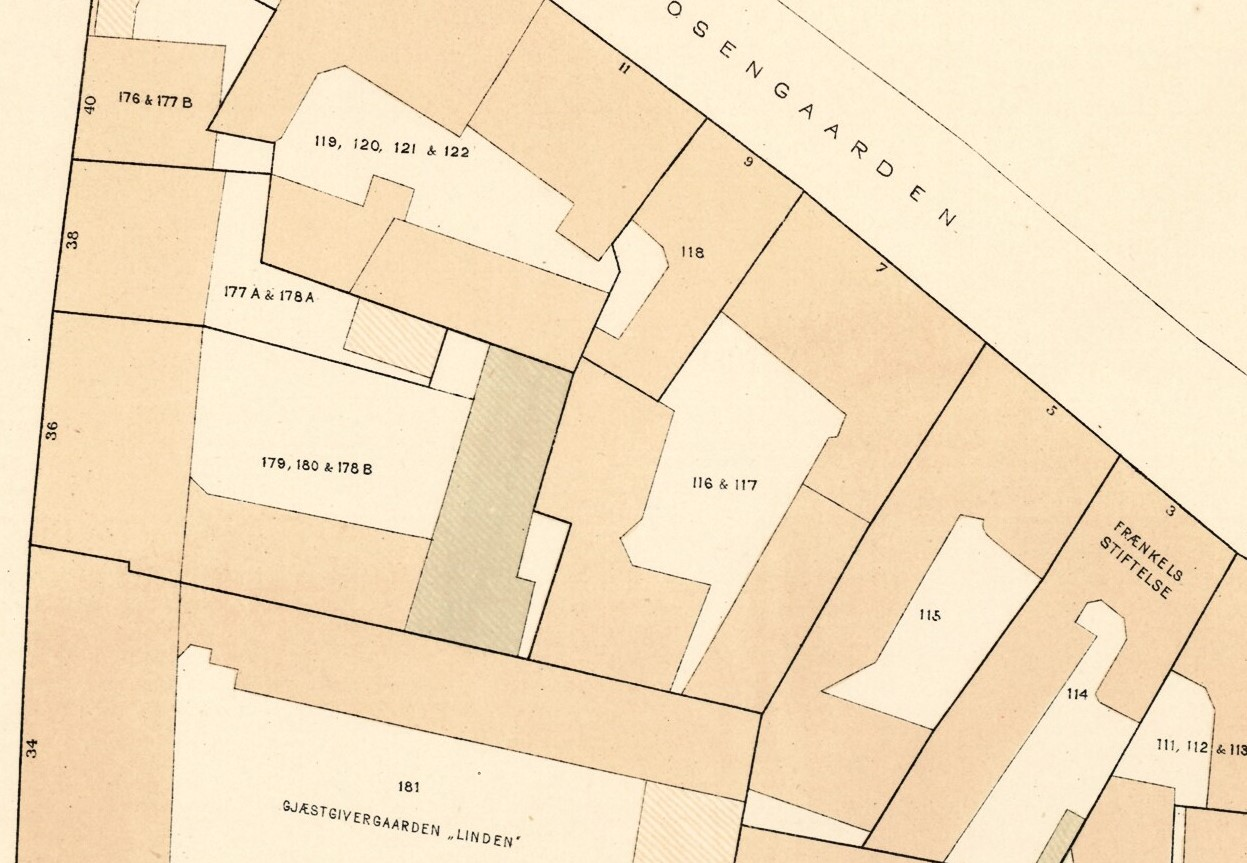
Rosengården 7 seen on one of Berggreen's block plans of Klædebo Quarter, 1886–88. Notice the two now demolished side wings.

The properties No. 116/117 and No. 115 were both acquired by master saddler Johan Christian Culmsee (1698–1868) in the first half of the 1840s. The present buildings on the site were both constructed for him in 1844–45. At the time of the 1845 census, on 1 February, No. 116/117 was registered with 88 residents, indicating that at least part of the building complex had been completed at that time. Most of the tenants were workmen or craftsmenm, small-scale traders or widows employed with needlework.

Culmsee resided in the neighboring building No. 115 (now Rosengården 5). His sons Harald and Charles were thus born i the building in 1844 and 1846.

In 1854, Culmsee purchased Havreholm Paper Mill. The enterprise was managed by his brother Frederik Leopold Cilmsee.

At the time of the 1860 census, No. 116/117 was home to 73 residents in the front wing, 47 residents in the side wing to the right and 54 residents in the side wing to the left.

Johan Christian Culmsee was himself a resident of the building at the time of his death on 7 August 1768.

== Architure ==
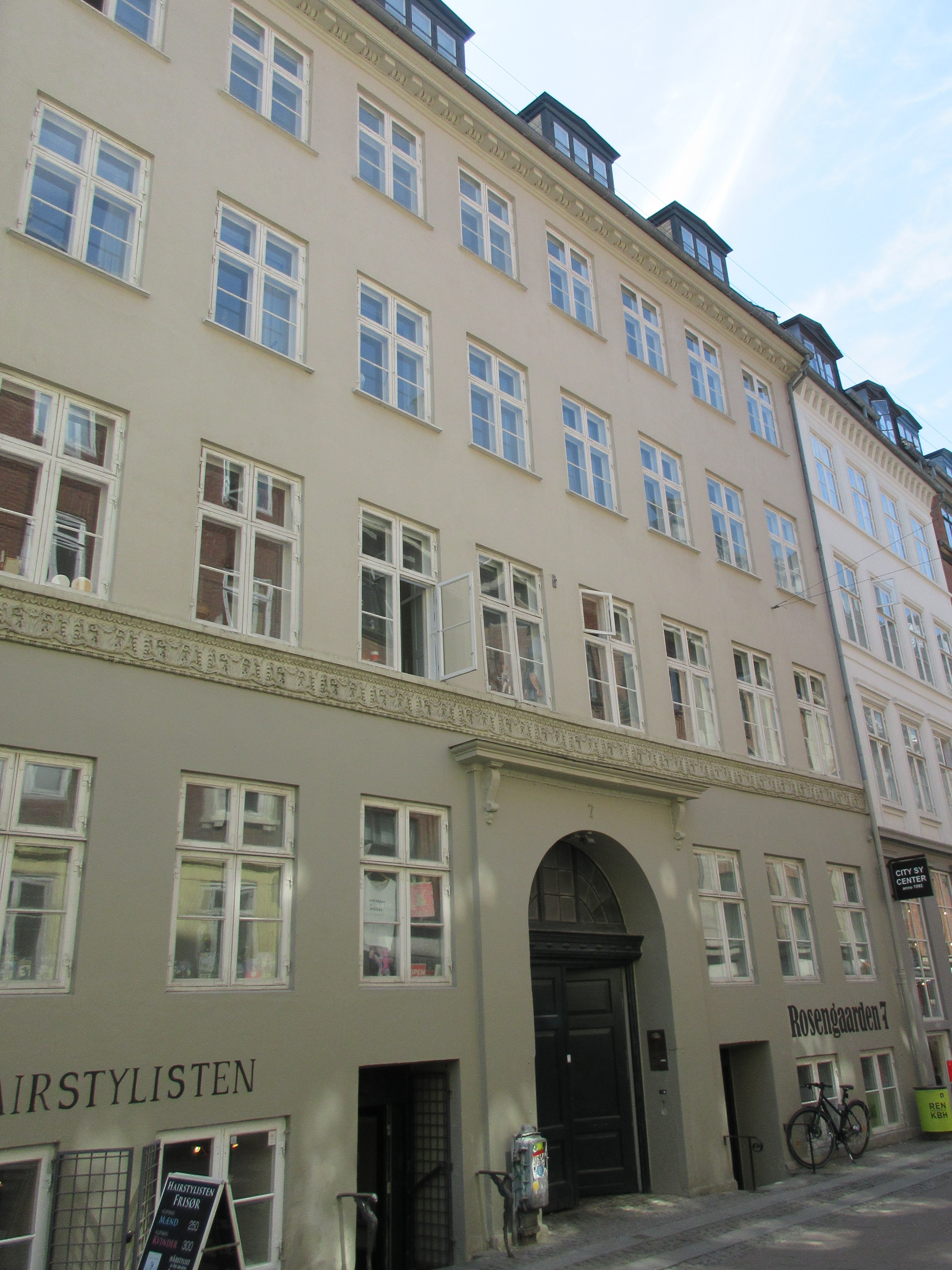
Rosengården 7.

The building is constructed with four storeys over a walk-out basement. The eight-bays-wide facade is plastered and grey-painted. The facade is finished with a frieze with stucco ornamentation below the first-floor windows and a dentillated cornice.. A two-bay arched gateway is located in the centre of the facade. It is topped by a hood mould supported by corbels, The gate is flanked by two basement entrances in the adjacent bays. Access to the upper floors is via a door in the gateway. The roof is clad in red tiles. It features five dormer windows towards the street.

== Today ==
TRosengården 5–7 are today owned by Andelsboligforeningen Rosengården.
