= Laura Aller =

Danish business woman and magazine publisher

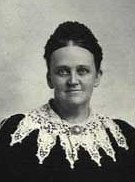
Laura Aller (1896)

Laura Christiane Aller née Bierring (1849–1917) was a Danish business woman and a pioneering magazine publisher. She first helped her husband Carl Aller to develop his photolithographic method of image production to establish a magazine containing recipes in 1874. The beautifully illustrated Illustreret Familie-Journal published from 1877 proved to be a huge success. Laura Aller not only had a flair for business, she understood exactly what people wanted to read. As editor-in-chief, she translated articles from the foreign press and added her own stories and poetry. After colour was added in 1895, sales increased dramatically and production was moved to larger premises on Vigerslev Allé in Valby. Aller Media, now based on Havneholmen in Copenhagen's South Harbour, is still run by the Aller family.

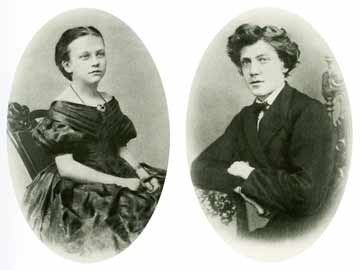
Early portraits of Laura and Carl Aller

== Biography ==
Born on 14 January 1849 in Copenhagen, Laura Christiane Bierring was the daughter of the herbalist Lauritz Jørgen Bierring (1816–1854) and Christine Clausen (1816–1971). Brought up in a modest Copenhagen home, on 20 October 1871 she married the lithographer Carl Julius Aller (1845–1926) who had become known for inventing a new photolithographic process facilitating the production of multiple copies of the same image.

Following their marriage, Laura Aller demonstrated her understanding of what people liked to read by publishing recipes in the Nordisk Mønster Tidende in 1874. Even more successful was Illustreret Familie-Journal which came out three years later. Complete with attractive illustrations, it kept people updated on the most important events of the day in an entertaining style with a humorous slant.

Laura Aller was instrumental in the magazine's success, handling the accounts, distribution and, above all, content. She not only translated material from foreign sources but wrote short pieces herself, frequently in verse. Within a few years, the magazine was being read by the royal family, city dwellers and country people. Such was the income from sales that the family bought the luxurious Sophienholm manor on Lake Bagsværd and travelled to the south of France in their own railway car.

After a modern production plant had been developed, in 1895 the magazine was the first in Scandinavia to appear in colour. Despite competition from other magazines such as Hjemmet, launched in 1898, the firm continued to expand and in 1900 had to move into larger premises in the Valby district of Copenhagen. In 1912, a paper factory was added.

Contributing to the very end, Laura Aller died in Copenhagen on 9 October 1917. She is buried in Vestre Cemetery.
