= Vilhelm Andersen =

Danish author, literary historian and intellectual

- Born: Vilhelm Rasmus Andreas Andersen; 16 October 1864; Nordrup, Slagelse Municipality, Denmark
- Died: 3 April 1953 (aged 88); Hillerød, Denmark
- Occupations: Writer; historian
- Years active: 1888–1951

Vilhelm Rasmus Andreas Andersen (16 October 1864 – 3 April 1953) was a Danish author, literary historian and intellectual, who primarily focused on the study of Danish literature. He was one of the first to use the term "Golden Age of Culture" to refer to the 1800s, and his focus on bringing Danish literature to the public earned him great popularity. Andersen was instrumental in the development of the School of Radio, as a means of disseminating public education to prevent loss of cultural identity and treasures.

== Biography ==
Vilhelm Rasmus Andreas Andersen was born on 16 October 1864 in Nordrup at Ringsted in the Slagelse Municipality of Denmark, son of Frederik Vilhelm Andersen. He graduated from Sorø Academy in 1882, having studied language and literature. He continued his studies at the University of Copenhagen taking his examinations in 1888. He won the university's gold medal in Nordic philology in 1891 and took his doctorate in 1896 with his thesis Guldhornene (The Golden Horns). He was appointed a professor of Danish literature in 1908 by Copenhagen University.

Andersen began to write around 1893, with such pieces as Danske Studier (1893), Poul Møller, hans Liv og Skrifter (1894), Adam Oehlenschläger, I—III (1894–1900), Litteraturbilleder I—II (1903, 1907), among others. In these works he attempts to penetrate the poet's intentions both through linguistic analysis and by psychological study, particularly for the works of Poul Møller and Adam Oehlenschläger. There are smaller scientific papers drawing on philology, the study of language development. Andersen later returned to Møller (1904) and Oehlenschläger, (1917) and wrote smaller works on Frederik Paludan-Müller, Henrik Pontoppidan, and Vilhelm Topsøe.

In 1918 Andersen was appointed as a full professor in Nordic literature at the university, and held that post until 1930. His intellectual, historical masterpieces cover the various periods of Danish literature and attempt to bind the study of classical literature with the domestic growth in Danish and European intellectual life over the centuries. He was the first to use the term "Golden Age of Culture", to refer to the 1800s and his analysis of subjects in that period built up Danish literary history with such works as his three volumes on Ludvig Holberg—Ludvig Holberg paa Tersløsegaard (1904), Holberg billedbog, billeder af Vilhelm Marstrand (1922) and Mindeblad fra Holberg-Samfundets Opførelse af Philosophus udi egen Indbildning (1924)—; his two volumes on Erasmus—Tider og typer af dansk aands historie (1907) and Det attende aarhundrede Gyldendalske (1909)—; his two volumes on Goethe—Det nittende aarhundredes sidste halvdel (1916) and Tider og typer af Dansk aands historie. 1. raekke, Humanisme. 2. del, Goethe (1917)—; and the volumes on Horace—Horats. 1, Antiken (1939), Horats. 2, Fra Middelalder til Nytid (1940), Horats. 3, Det nittende aarhundrede: Strejftog (1942), Horats. 4, Norden. (1) (1948), Horats. 5, Norden. (2) (1949), and Horats. 6, Norden. (3) (1951).

His teaching and writing had great influence on the foundations of Denmark's national literature. In his later period, he wrote "Illustreret dansk litteraturhistorie" (Illustrated Danish Literary History) in four volumes with Carl S. Petersen and a libretto for Carl Nielsen's opera Maskarade based on Holberg's comedy. Andersen traveled the country and was popular for his readings and lectures on literature which he presented on Danmarks Radio. He helped create the country's radio school.

Andersen received many honors and awards throughout his life, including the University of Copenhagen Gold medal, the Tietgenkollegeit Medal and, in 1934, the Holberg Medal, becoming its first recipient. He was an honorary member of the Danish Writers Society and an honorary citizen of Ringsted.

He died on 3 April 1953 in Hillerød. A collection of his articles Om at skrive den danske ånds historie was published posthumously in 1986.

== Selected works ==
- Andersen, Vilhelm. Poul Møller, hans Liv og Skrifter: efter trykte og utrykte Kilder: i Hundredaaret for hans Fødsel Gyldendal: Copenhagen (1894) (in Danish)
- Andersen, Vilhelm Rasmus Andreas. Guldhornene et bidrag til den danske romantiks historie Nordiske forlag, E. Bojesen: Copenhagen (1896) (in Danish)
- Andersen, Vilhelm Rasmus Andreas. Adam Oehlenschläger, et livs poesi Nordiske forlag, E. Bojesen: Copenhagen (1899–1900) (in Danish)
- Andersen, Vilhelm. Poul Møller : hans liv og skrifter. 2 Gad: Copenhagen (1904) (in Danish)
- Andersen, Vilhelm. Ludvig Holberg paa Tersløsegaard Gyldendal: Kristiania (1904) (in Danish)
- Andersen, Vilhelm. Tider og typer af dansk aands historie Nordiske forlag, E. Bojesen: Copenhagen (1907) (in Danish)
- Andersen, Vilhelm. Det attende aarhundrede Gyldendalske Boghandel: Copenhagen (1909) (in Danish)
- Andersen, Vilhelm Rasmus Andreas. Paludan-Müller Gyldendal: Copenhagen (1910) (in Danish)
- Andersen, Vilhelm. Det nittende aarhundredes sidste halvdel Gyldendalske Boghandel: Copenhagen (1916) (in Danish)
- Andersen, Vilhelm. Tider og typer af Dansk aands historie. 1. raekke, Humanisme. 2. del, Goethe Gyldendalske Boghandel: Copenhagen (1917) (in Danish)
- Andersen, Vilhelm. Henrik Pontoppidan: et nydansk Forfatterskab Gyldendal: Copenhagen (1917) (in Danish)
- Andersen, Vilhelm. Vilhelm Topsøe: et bidrag til den danske realismes historie Gad: Copenhagen (1922) (in Danish)
- Andersen, Vilhelm. Holberg Billedbog. Billeder af Vilhelm Marstrand Aschehoug: Copenhagen (1922) (in Danish)
- Andersen, Vilhelm. Mindeblad fra Holberg-Samfundets Opførelse af Philosophus udi egen Indbildning Aschehoug: Copenhagen (1924) (in Danish)
- Andersen, Vilhelm. Dansk litteratur. Forskning og undervisning Gyldendal: Copenhagen (1933) (in Danish)
- Andersen, Vilhelm Rasmus Andreas; Carl S Petersen and Richard Jakob Paulli. Illustreret dansk litteraturhistorie Gyldendal: Copenhagen (1924–34) (in Danish)
- Andersen, Vilhelm. Horats. 1, Antiken GyldendalGyldendal: Copenhagen (1939) (in Danish)
- Andersen, Vilhelm. Horats. 2, Fra Middelalder til Nytid GyldendalGyldendal: Copenhagen (1940) (in Danish)
- Andersen, Vilhelm. Horats. 3, Det nittende aarhundrede: Strejftog GyldendalGyldendal: Copenhagen (1942) (in Danish)
- Andersen, Vilhelm. Horats. 4, Norden. (1) GyldendalGyldendal: Copenhagen (1948) (in Danish)
- Andersen, Vilhelm. Horats. 5, Norden. (2) GyldendalGyldendal: Copenhagen (1949) (in Danish)
- Andersen, Vilhelm. Horats. 6, Norden. (3) GyldendalGyldendal: Copenhagen (1951) (in Danish)
- Andersen, Vilhelm and Per Dahl. Om at skrive den danske ånds historie: ti artikler, 1888–1951 Gyldendal: Copenhagen (1985) (in Danish)
