= Louise Ipsen =

Danish businesswoman

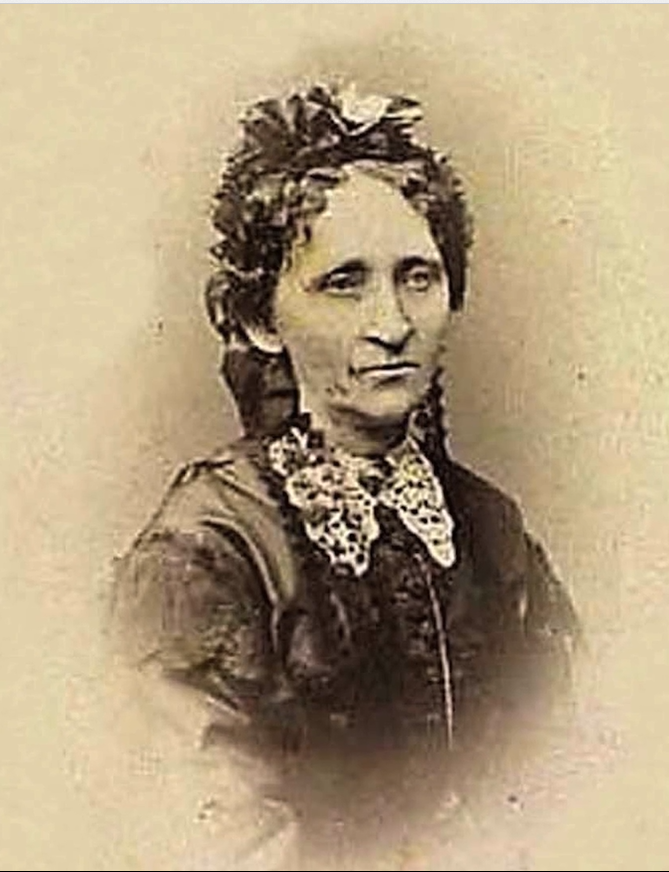
Louise Ipsen (1822–1905)

Christine Louise Ipsen (née Bierring, sometimes written Bjerring; 1822 Køge, – May 5, 1905 Copenhagen) was a Danish businessperson. She was a major industrialist as the owner and manager of the famous P. Ipsens Enke, and as such uncommon for woman at that time. She also achieved Royal warrant of appointment (1871).

== Life ==
Ipsen's parents were merchant Jacob Bierring (1783–1865) and Cathrine Gemynthe (1790–1869), and she married factory owner Rasmus Peter Ipsen (1815–1860) in 1843.

The year of her marriage, her husband founded a ceramics manufacturing firm which, after his death in 1860, became internationally famous because of his widow. It was named for her as P. Ipsens Enke (Widow of P. Ipsen). She was an active partner in the development of the business, and took over its management herself in widowhood. She continued to manage it with success until her death. In 1871, she obtained a royal warrant of appointment as Kgl. Hof Leverandør. Her business exported to Paris and London and participated in international exhibitions. She was described as strong, warm and humble.

Ipsen died in 1905.

== External list ==
- Listing in Danish Women's Encyclopedia Dansk Kvindebiografisk Leksikon
