= Emmy Drachmann =

Danish writer

Emmy Drachmann (23 October 1854 – 20 January 1928) was a Danish writer and the wife of Holger Drachmann.

== Biography ==
Emmy Drachmann (née Culmsee) was born as the youngest of nine children parented by Frederik Leopold Culmsee (1811–95) and Nicoline Rasmussen (1818–86). She was born in Køge but grew up at the Havreholm Paper Mill which her father owned. She first met Holger Drachmann, a friend of her elder brother, Valdemar, when he visited Havreholm in 1866. At the age of 13, Emmy moved to Kristiania with her parents and stayed there until 1876 when she moved to Hamburg to study language. Drachmann paid her a visit but when she realized it was due to his interest in her sister Polly Thalbitzer she left for England where she assumed a position as German teacher in a pastor's house. During a holiday with friends in Hamburg in 1878, she was contacted by Drachmann's sister who informed her about the writer's breakdown after Polly had left him. She went to Copenhagen to nurse him and they were later married in St Paul's Church on 17 May 1879. They adopted Drachmann's daughter with Polly and had four more children. Their marriage marked the beginning of a calm and productive period for Holger Drachmann. Emmy assisted him with the translation of Byron's Don Juan. She later translated Gottfried Keller's Der grüne Heinrich (1883–84) as well as works by authors such as Rudolf Baumbach, Peter Rosegger, Sergey Stepnyak-Kravchinsky and Peter Kropotkin.

In 1887, Holger Drachmann began an affair with the cabaret singer "Edith" and in 1892 left their home. Emmy Drachmann travelled with her children to Dresden, where they lived for five years while she began her career as an author.

Emmy and Holger Drachmann were divorced in 1903. She died in Roskilde in 1928 and is buried at Vestre Cemetery in Copenhagen.

== Works ==
Emmy Drachmann published the novel Grevinde Cossel in 1899. It was followed by Villa Mackenzie (1902), Inger (1910), a fictional account of her marriage, and Mødre (1914). Her memoir Erindringer. Barndom og Ungdom til 1883 (until 1883) was published in 1925.
