= Bettina Aller =

Danish businesswoman

Bettina Charlotte Aller (born 23 June 1962) is the chairman and chief executive of the media company Aller Media, of which she is also co-owner.

She has written three books, has been on six North Pole Expeditions, four alone and two with her husband Jean Gabriel. During the second expedition, Aller took her arm off the hook and had to get out of the ice before reaching the North Pole. The two expeditions are recorded by Jean Gabriel on film and shown on DR1, TV2, Discovery Channel and National Geographic under the titles "Lovers on the ice" and "99 days on the ice".

Aller has two children born in 1993 and 1996 from her first marriage with Ole Simonsen. She is married to the French freelance photographer Jean Gabriel Leynaud, with whom she has twin children.
