= Edith Rode =

Danish journalist

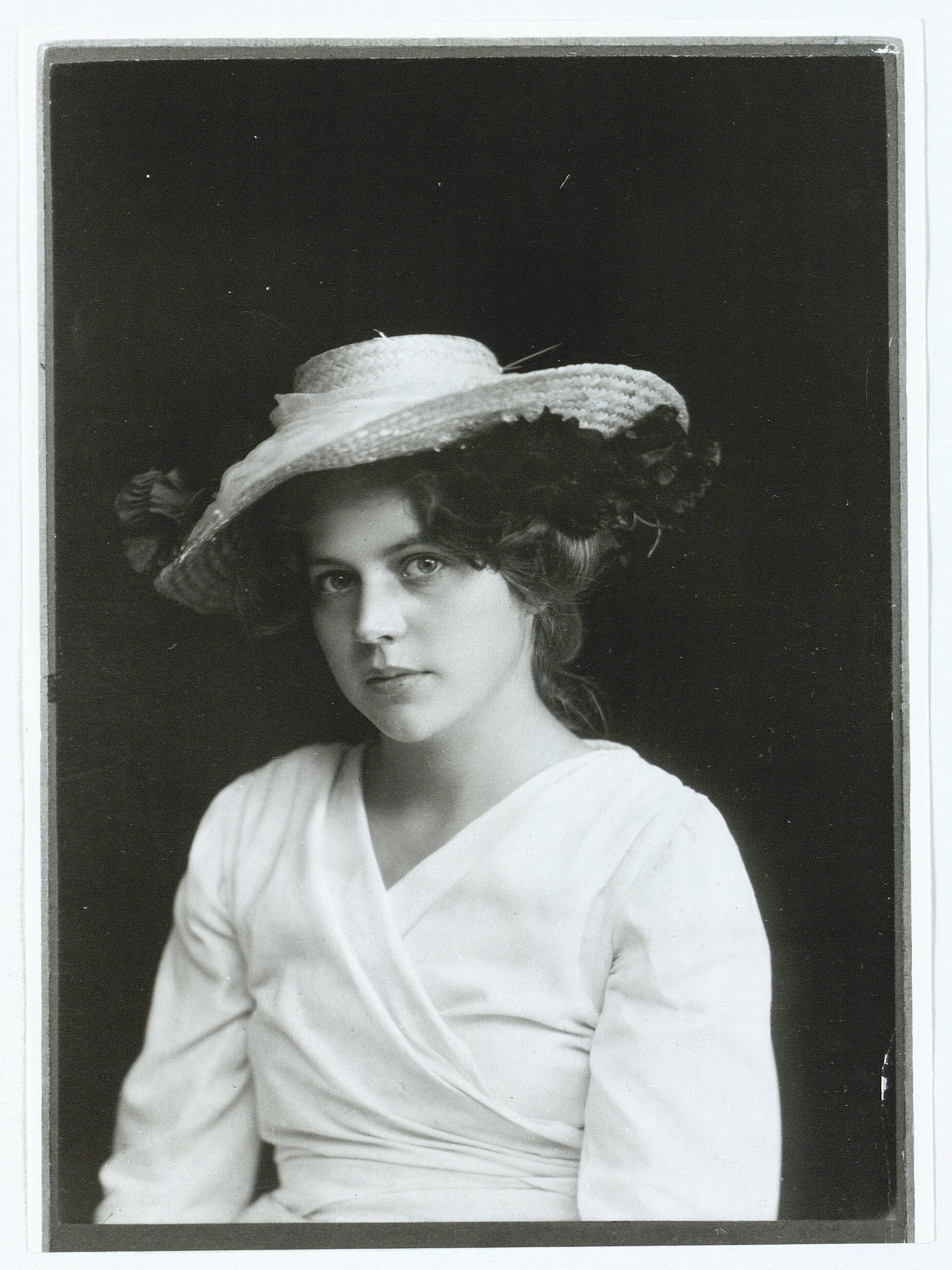
Edith Rode

Edith Rode née Nebelong (23 February 1879 – 3 September 1956) was a Danish novelist and a journalist with Berlingske Tidende. She also ran a popular correspondence column for the magazine Familie Journalen. In addition to fiction, she was the editor of Den gyldne bog om danske kvinder (1941), a collection of biographies of notable Danish women. She is remembered in particular for the three memoir portraits she wrote towards the end of her life: Der var engang, Paa Togt i Erindringen, and Paa Rejse i Livet.

== Early life and family ==
Born on 23 February 1879 in Copenhagen, Edith Nebelong was the daughter of the court physician Carl Henrik Horn Nebelong (1844–1904) and Harriet Kiellerup (1858–1935). The eldest of three daughters, she was brought up in a well-to-do liberal home by an academic, liberally-minded father and a rather conservative mother. Together with her sisters, she attended Vemmetofte Jomfrukloster School, although she later reported she had never learnt anything there.

Hoping to escape from a home where her relationship with her mother was increasingly difficult, in April 1902 she married the painter Fritz Julius August Magnussen. They went to Italy on an extended honeymoon where her husband painted with the Nordic artists in Florence while she wrote novels. While there, she met and fell in love with the journalist and critic Helge Rode (1870–1937) who was nine years her senior. They eloped to Capri and married in September 1905 after she had obtained a divorce from Magnussen. They had four children, Asta (born in Capri in 1903), Gregers (1906), Mikal (1908) and Ebbe (1910), who became a celebrated actor.

== Career ==
Edith had embarked on her literary career while in her early twenties, publishing Misse Wichmann and Maja Engell in 1901. Both revealed how women's sensual desires were subdued by men unable to cope with the freedom and independence sought by women. They were both successful, receiving positive reviews.

After her second marriage, she was forced into writing even more profusely as her husband's income proved to be inadequate. In addition to writing novels, from 1913 she worked as a journalist for the newspaper Berlingske Tidende for the next 30 years, contributing articles about fires and dances rather than hard news. In 1937, she started the highly popular correspondence column in Familie Journalen which she ran for the rest of her life. She was succeeded by writer Tove Ditlevsen.

Throughout her literary career she was highly productive, publishing some 40 books during her lifetime, not just novels and short stories but also poetry, short travel guides, memoirs and cookbooks. Her earlier works were published under her maiden name Edith Nebelong and one under her pen name Anatole Mille.

She was editor-in-chief of the collection of biographies of notable Danish women, Den gyldne bog om danske kvinder, published in 1941. Several of her most memorable works appeared in her later life. In 1943, the collection of short stories De tre smaa piger is inspired by her own childhood while Der var engang (1951), På togt i erindringen (1953) and På rejse i livet, published posthumously in 1957, represent her memoirs.

Edith Rode died in the Frederiksberg district of Copenhagen on 3 September 1956 and is buried in Frederiksberg Ældre Kirkegård.
