= Vestre Cemetery (Copenhagen) =

Cemetery in Copenhagen, Denmark

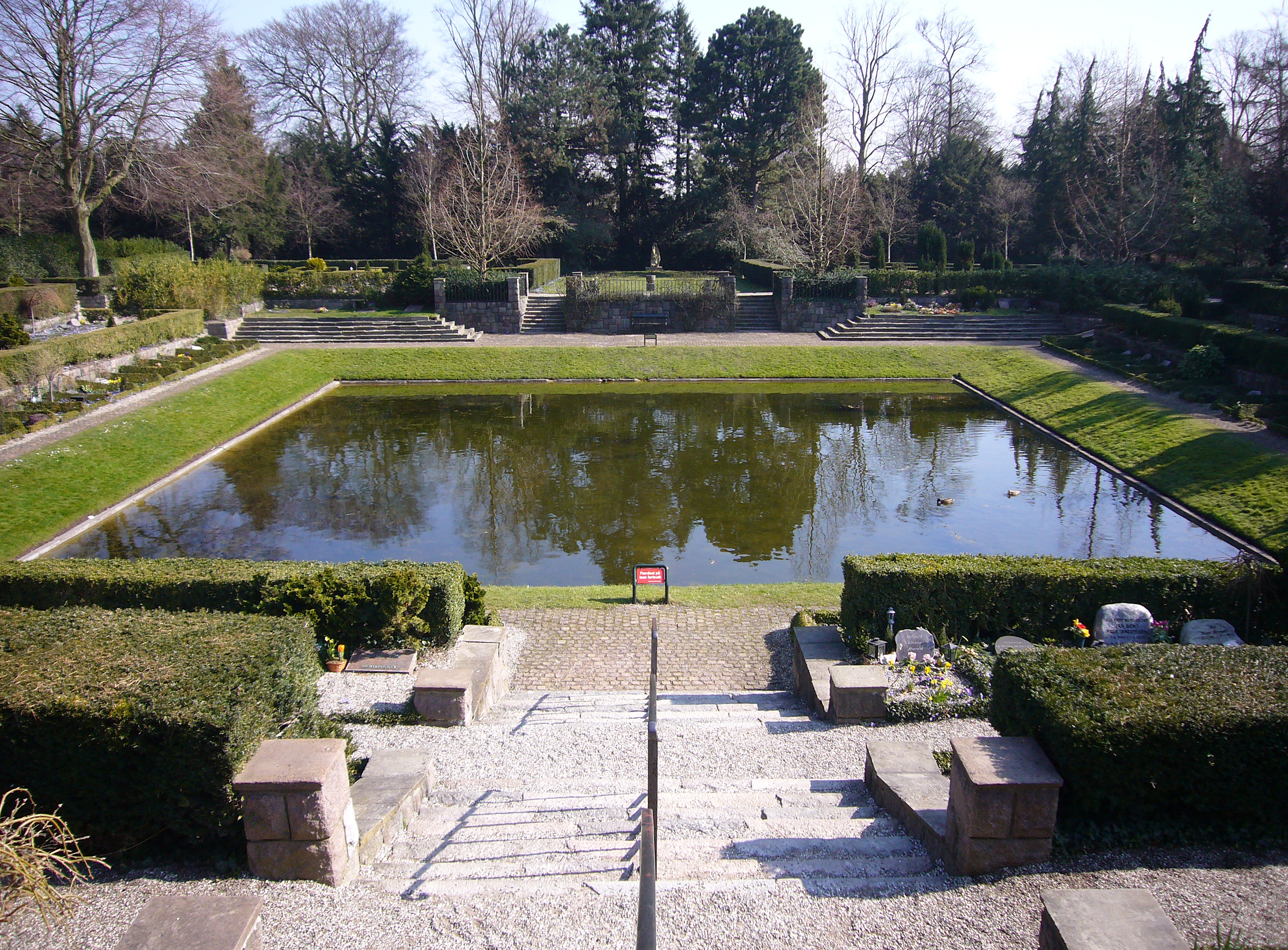
- One of the cemetery's two lakes
- Interactive map of Vestre Cemetery

Details
- Established: 1870
- Location: Copenhagen
- Country: Denmark
- Coordinates: 55°39′28″N 12°31′45″E
- Size: 54 ha (130 acres)
- Website: Official website
- Find a Grave: Vestre Cemetery

Vestre Cemetery (Danish: Vestre Kirkegård, meaning "Western Cemetery") is located in a large park setting in the Kongens Enghave district of Copenhagen, Denmark. With its 54 hectares it is the largest cemetery in Denmark.

The cemetery is landscaped and serves as an important open space, in which people take a stroll, and look at the old graves and monuments. It is located southwest of the city center, between the Carlsberg, Sydhavn, Sjælør and Valby train stations of Copenhagen's S-train network, and right next to the historic Carlsberg neighbourhood.

The cemetery is one of five run by Copenhagen municipality. The other cemeteries are Assistens Cemetery, Brønshøj Cemetery, Sundby Cemetery, and Bispebjerg Cemetery. The cemetery has a Catholic section, and next to that is a Jewish cemetery (the Jewish Western Cemetery).

== History ==
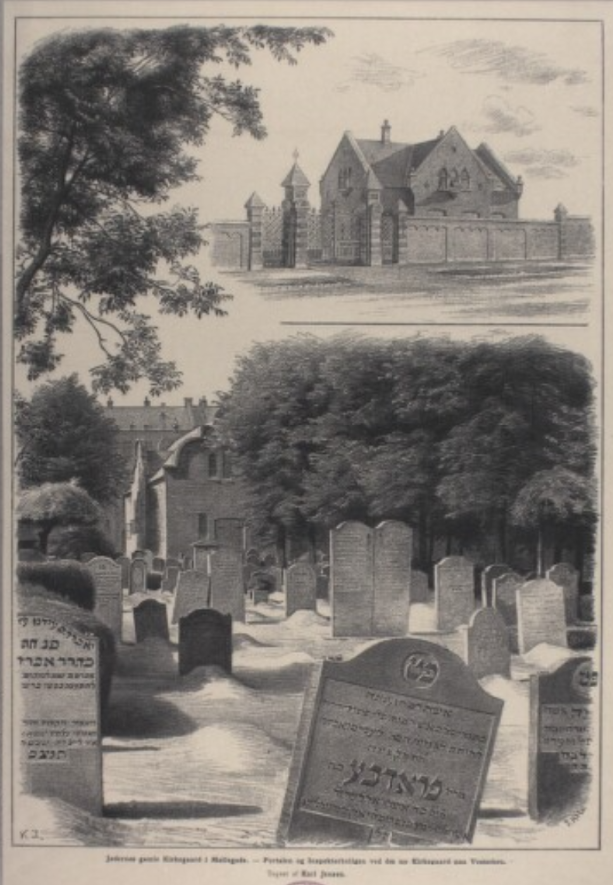
Vestre Cemetery

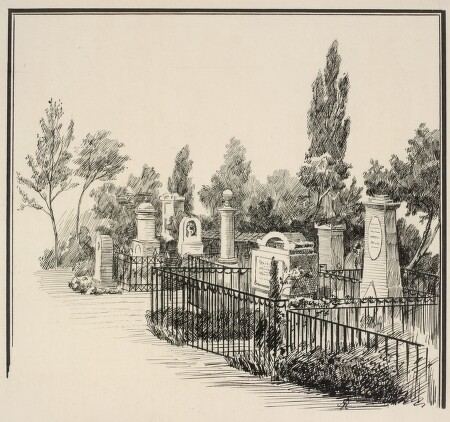
Assistens Cemetery in 1897

Vestre Kirkegård was opened on 2 November 1870 to accommodate an urgent need for adequate burial places for the growing population of Copenhagen. Assistens Cemetery, till then the main cemetery of the city, had long been unable to cope with the increasing number of burials.

Hans Jørgen Holm, who was the resident architect for the Copenhagen Burial Services, in collaboration with landscape architect Edvard Glæsel (1858–1915) and city engineer Charles Ambt were responsible for the overall planning and landscaping of the new cemetery. Almost all the buildings in the grounds have been designed by Hans Jørgen Holm or Holger Jacobsen, who succeeded him as resident architect for the Copenhagen Burial Services. Holm designed both the North Chapel and South Chapel (1906) as well as an office building the gate at the main entrance. It is unclear who were responsible for the design of the former inspector's house just inside the main entrance. The East Chapel was inaugurated in 1914 to a design by Holger Jacobsen but only remained in use until 1926.

First a burial place for the poor, Vestre Kirkegaard became the principal burial place of Copenhagen during the 1990s.

== Environment ==
The cemetery is noted for its scenery, offers a maze of dense groves, open lawns, winding paths, hedges, overgrown tombs, monuments, tree-lined avenues, ponds and other garden features. Many graves have distinctive gravestones, sculptures or large mausoleums and are eclectically placed. The cemetery's grounds have a variety of trees with many rare species and is a haven to birds and small mammals.

== Monuments and sculptures ==
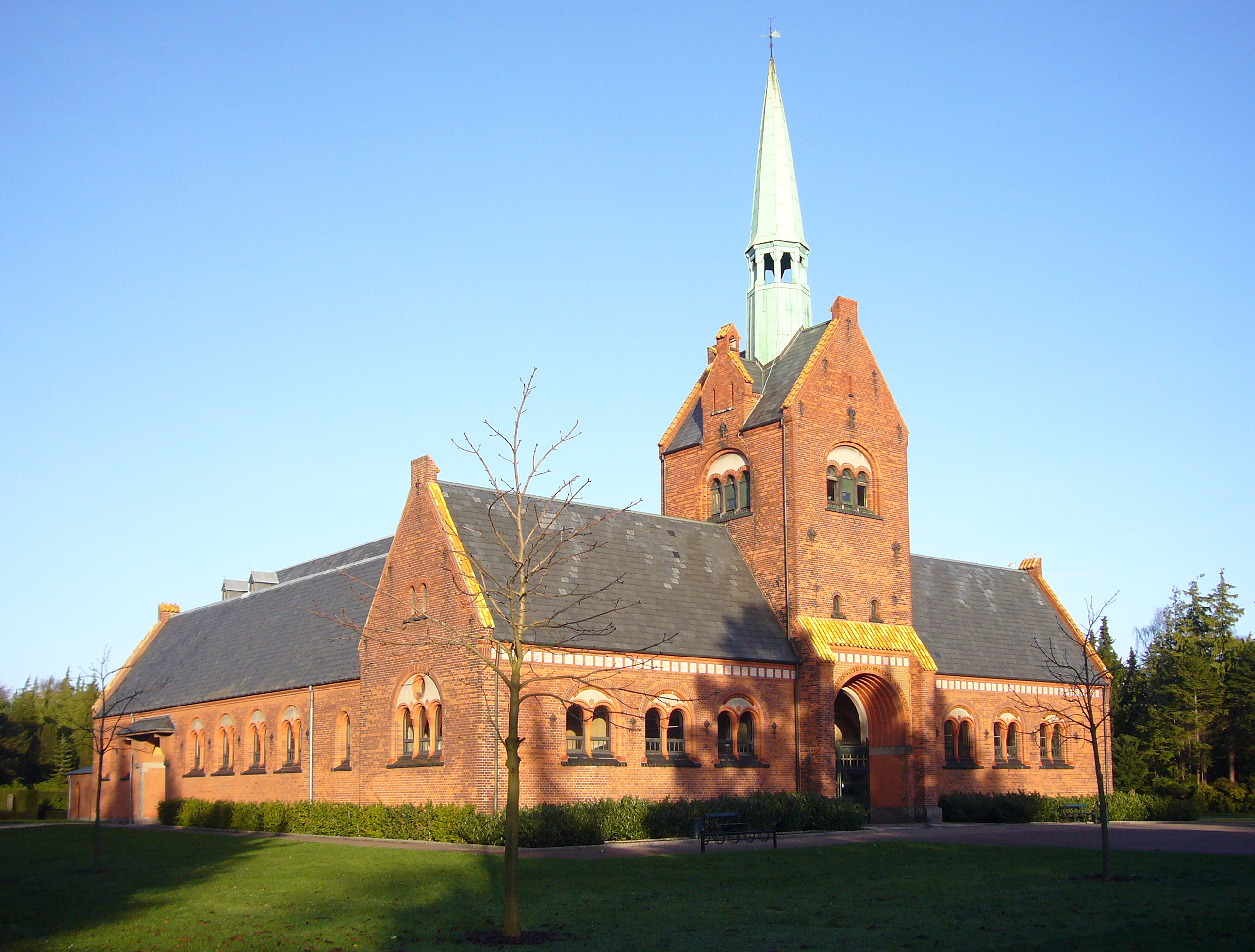
The North Chapel

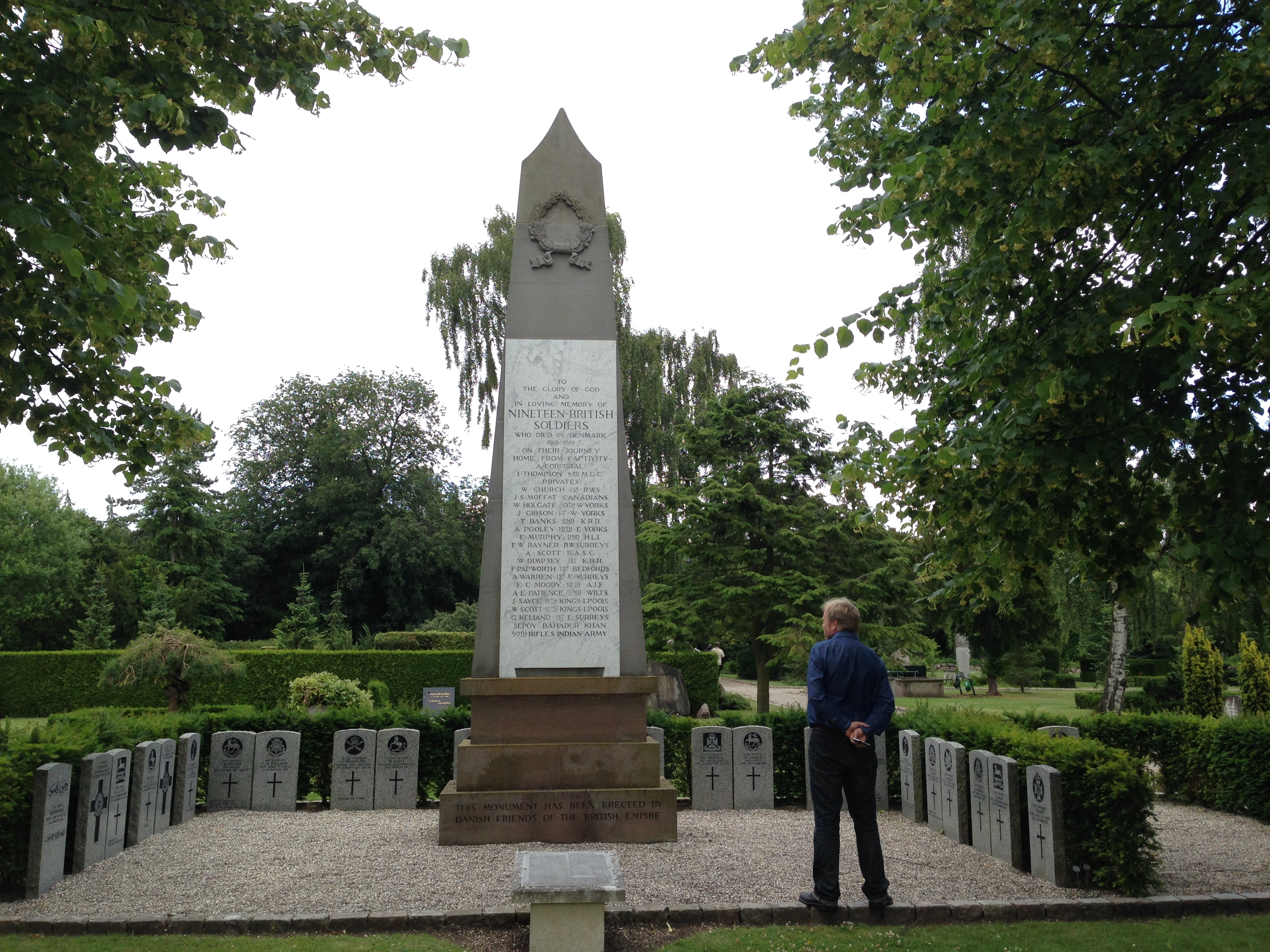
The memorial to British soldiers buried at Vestre Kirkegård

Just inside the main entrance is Arne Bang's bronze statue En Falden ("A Fallen"), which was installed in 1942 to commemorate the Danish soldiers that were killed when Denmark was occupied by Nazi Germany on 9 April 1940. In the North Chapel's courtyard garden are two reliefs by the artist Henrik Starcke, Death and Resurrection, which were installed in 1949. They were a gift from the Albertina Foundation.

Nineteen British former prisoners of war released at the end of World War I, homeward bound, died at Copenhagen around New Year 1919. Among them were a Canadian, an Indian and an Australian from Tasmania. Each has a Commonwealth War Graves Commission headstone and a fine memorial, given by the Danes, was unveiled in their honour in 1920. There are also buried three British casualties from World War II.

In the Faroese section is a monument created by the painter Elof Risebye. The monument in the Greenlandic section 19 is from 1963 and was designed by the sculptor Jan Buhl.

== The Crossroads Project ==
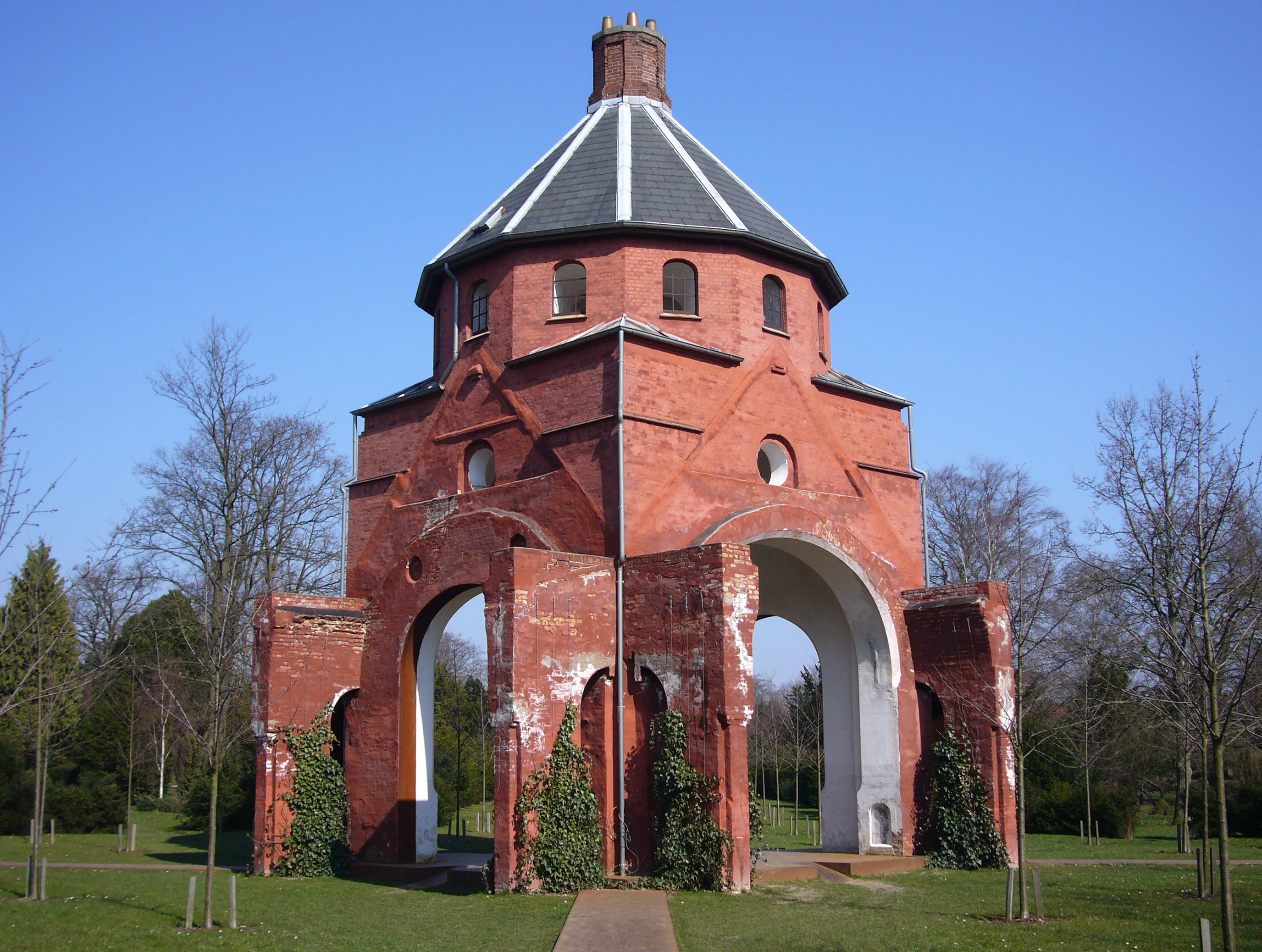
The remains of the South Chapel

The Crossroads Project (Danish: Stjernevejsprojektet), designed by Schønher Landskab, is a landscape project centred on the remains of the South Chapel, now serving as a pavilion for contemplation. It was created in 2003 after Copenhagen Municipality arranged a competition for the regeneration of an area characterized by the abandoned South Chapel of the cemetery and elm trees dead from Dutch elm disease. The complex is intended to serve a dual purpose both relating to the location's function as a burial place and as an open space and meeting place in the city, for those seeking peace and silence.

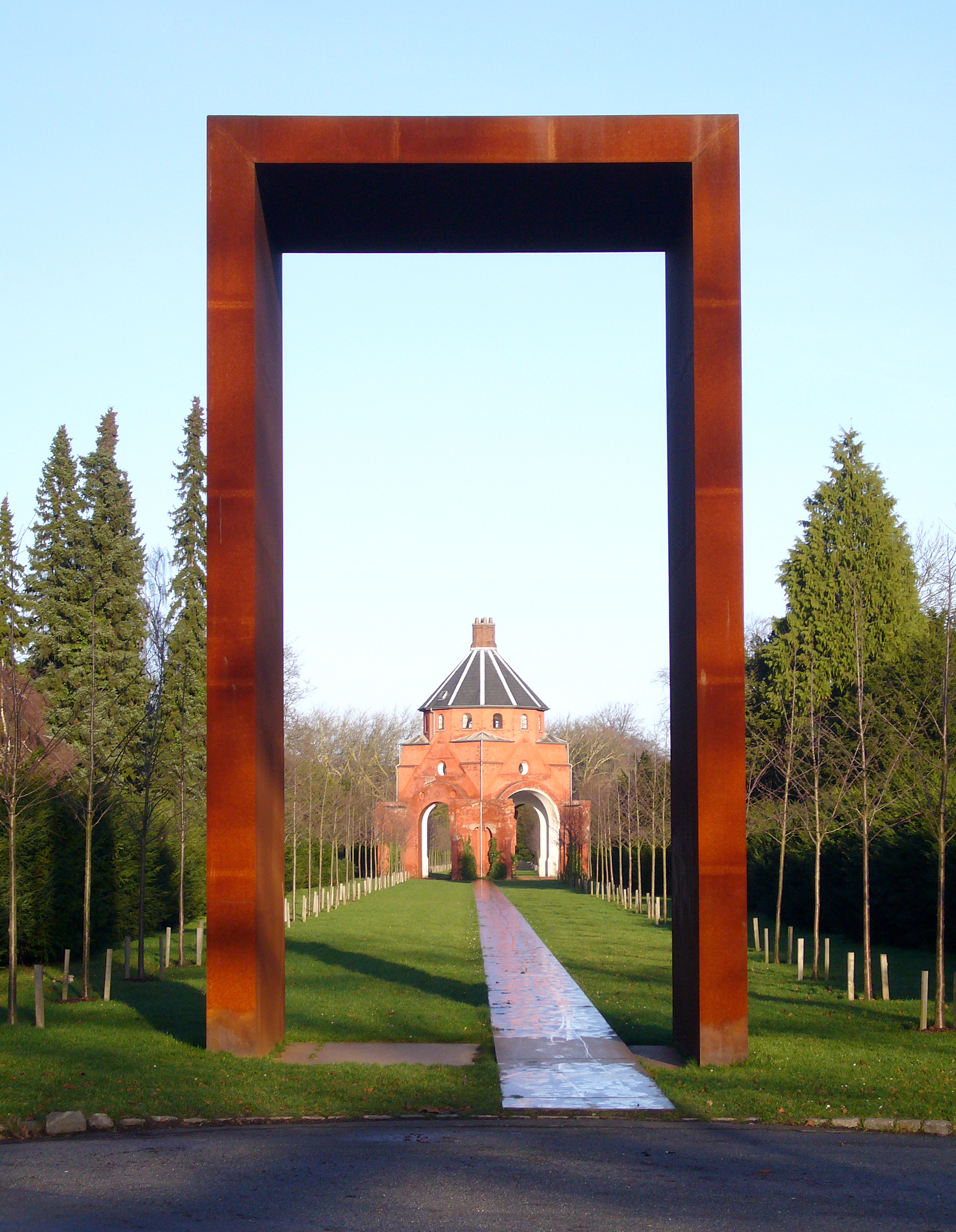
One of the four paths

The complex consists of two intersecting axes with the former Southern Chapel in its centre. The chapel was partly demolished, leaving only the central part as an open pavilion-like domed structure. The building is partly overgrown by ivy. The surrounding garden spaces of the two axes, creating a Greek cross, are confined by tall yew hedges and have a grass surface. Embedded in the lawns of the cross arms are narrow, rust coloured paths made of oxidized iron plates, flanked by rows by cherry trees. At the end of each cross arm is a 9 metre tall rust coloured iron arch.

The design of the project is inspired by Bramante's Tempietto in Rome and the Baroque gardens of Villa Gori in Siena. The latter is characterized by the garden being contained in the two axes of the garden, instead of the axes being the connecting feature of the surrounding gardens as is normally the case.

== Interments ==
Among the notables interred at the cemetery are political and business leaders, philosophers, artists, and musicians:

- Carl Aller (1845–1926), publisher, founder of Aller Media
- Laura Aller (1849–1917), pioneering editor and magazine publisher
- Hans Niels Andersen (1852–1937), businessman, founder of East Asiatic Company
- Herman Bang (1857–1912), writer
- Vilhelm Buhl (1881–1954), political leader, Social Democrat Prime Minister of Denmark
- Anne Marie Carl-Nielsen (1863–1945), sculptor
- Emmy Drachmann (1854–1928), novelist
- Edvard Eriksen (1876–1959), sculptor, most famous for the statue of the Little Mermaid
- Jørgen Pedersen Gram (1850–1916), mathematician
- Gustav Adolph Hagemann (1842–1916), engineer and businessman
- Vilhelm Hammershøi (1864–1916), painter
- Hanna Hoffmann (1858–1917), sculptor and silversmith
- Karen Hannover (1872–1943), ceramist
- Hans Christian Hansen (1906–1960), political leader, Social Democrat Prime Minister
- Hans Hedtoft (1903–1955), political leader, Social Democrat Prime Minister
- Per Hækkerup (1915–1979), political leader, Social Democrat
- Arthur Jensen (1897–1981), actor
- August Jerndorff (1846–1906), painter
- Thad Jones (1923–1986), American jazz trumpeter
- Viggo Kampmann (1910–1975), political leader, Social Democrat Prime Minister
- Julie Marstrand (1882–1943), sculptor
- Asta Nielsen (1881–1972), film actress
- Dagmar Olrik (1860–1932), artist
- Carl Nielsen (1865–1931), composer
- Jens Otto Krag (1914–1978), political leader, Social Democrat Prime Minister
- Julius Petersen (1839–1910), mathematician
- Julie Ramsing (1871–1954), philanthropist
- Knud Rasmussen (1879–1933), polar explorer and anthropologist
- Carl Rohl-Smith (1848–1900), Danish-American sculptor
- Thorvald Stauning (1873–1942), political leader, first Social Democrat Prime Minister
- Hermann Baagøe Storck (1839–1922), architect and heraldic artist
- Hjalmar Söderberg (1869–1941), Swedish author
- Ed Thigpen (1930–2010), American jazz drummer
- Laurits Tuxen (1853–1927), sculptor, painter
- Clara Wæver (1855–1930), embroiderer
- Liva Weel (1897–1952), singer, actress
- Carlo Wieth (1885–1943), actor
- Kristian Zahrtmann (1843–1917), painter

== Cultural references ==
In Nordisk Foraar (1911, "Nordic Spring"), Johannes V. Jensen refers to Vestre Kirkegård as the fairest park in Copenhagen, "taller, more elegant than the city centre" (”Jeg gaar ud på Vestre Kirkegaard en Formiddag og finder mig til Rette./ Det er den smukkeste Park vi har, her er højere end inde i Byen, friere,/ og de unge Træer staar i Luftningen ude fra Søen og gror, svulmer af Frodighed”).

== See also ==
- Parks and open spaces in Copenhagen
