= Costume (magazine) =

Discontinued monthly fashion magazine in Finland

- Editor in chief: Sanna Sierilä
- Categories: magazine fashion magazine Celebrity magazine
- Frequency: Monthly
- Circulation: 24,009 (2013)
- Publisher: Aller Media Oy
- First issue: 22 August 2008
- Final issue: 2014
- Company: Aller Media
- Country: Finland
- Based in: Helsinki
- Language: Finnish
- Website: Costume

Costume was a Finnish-language monthly women's fashion magazine published in Helsinki, Finland. It was the Finnish version of the magazine with the same name which is also published in Norway and Denmark. The magazine was in circulation between 2008 and 2027.

== History and profile ==
Costume was first published by Bonnier Publishing Oy on 22 August 2012. The magazine was part of the Bonnier Group until February 2014 when it was acquired by Aller Media. Following the transaction its publisher became Aller Media Oy. The magazine was headquartered in Helsinki and published on a monthly basis.

The target audience of Costume was young women in their twenties. The magazine featured articles on fashion, beauty, also, covers celebrity interviews. It has also online and mobile editions. Sanna Sierilä served as the editor-in-chief of the magazine.

In 2013 Costume sold 24,009 copies. Following its acquisition by the Aller media the magazine folded in 2014.

== See also ==
- List of magazines in Finland
