= Carl Aller =

Danish publisher (1845–1926)

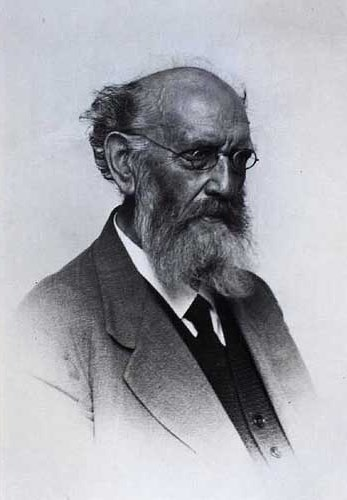
Carl Aller

Carl Julius Aller (25 November 1845 – 23 August 1926) was a Danish publisher of the late 19th and early 20th century and founder of Aller Media, the largest publisher of weekly magazines in the Nordic countries and still controlled by the Aller family.

== Early life and education ==
Carl Aller was born in Copenhagen on 25 November 1845, the son of brewer Christian Hansen Aller (1797–1852) and Juliane Christine Geschel el. Gechel (ca. 1806–72). He apprenticed as a lithographer in C. F. Aamodt's studio.

== Career ==
In am early age, Aller invented a new photolithographic method of image production. In 1869, he was awarded the Ørsted Grant for his invention.

Together with his wife, Laura Aller, he founded Carl Aller's Etablissement in 1873 and in 1874 they began the publication of Nordisk Mønster Tidende (later Femina).

In 1877, they launched a new magazine Illustrated Family Journal (Danish: Illustreret Familie Journal), with Laura Aller as editor-in-chief. The magazine experienced immediate success, partly due to the high quality of its illustrations. Aller improved printing techniques by transferring them to a lithographic stone and was for a long time the only publisher in Denmark to offer illustrations in nine colours. The company expanded fast, both through organic growth and acquisitions of numerous other printing businesses.

Swedish Aller (Svenska Aller AB) was founded in 1894 and Norwegian Aller (Norsk Aller A/S) in 1897, both under the leadership of one of Carl and Laura Aller's sons.

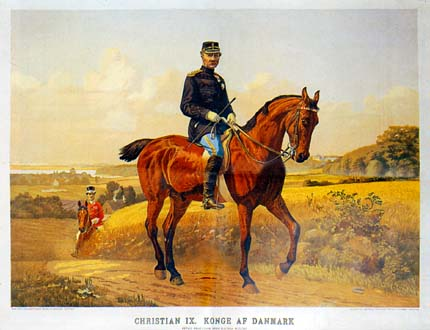
The first art supplement from 1897: Otto Bache's equestrian portrait of Christian IX of Denmark

== Popularizing art ==
From 1897, Illustrated Family Journal came with an art supplement. This contributed to bringing art into the homes of the wider population and popularizing both artists and artworks. The first art supplement was a reproduction of Otto Bache's equestrian portrait of King Christian IX of Denmark.

== Private life ==
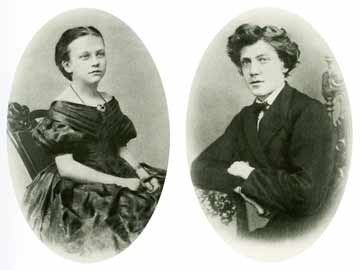
Laura and Carl Aller

Aller married Laura Christiane Bierring (14 January 1849 - 9 October 1917), a daughter of merchant Lauritz Jørgen B. (1816–54) and Christine Clausen (ca. 1817–71), on 20 October 1871 in St. John's Church in Nørrebro.

Carl Aller bought the Sophienholm estate north of Copenhagen in 1880. He died at Sophienholm on 23 August 1926 and is buried at Copenhagen's Western Cemetery.

== Honours and awards ==
Aller was awarded a Knight in the Order of the Dannebrog in 1915.
