= Henrik Olrik =

Danish painter and sculptor

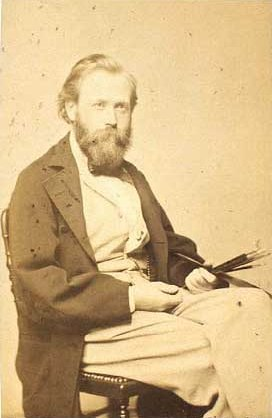
- Olrik photographed by H. C. Henneberg
- Born: 24 May 1830; Copenhagen, Denmark
- Died: 2 January 1890 (aged 59); Copenhagen
- Resting place: Vestre Kirkegard
- Education: Royal Danish Academy of Fine Arts
- Known for: Painting
- Awards: De Neuhausenske Præmier (1853); Det Anckerske Rejselegat (1876)

Ole Henrik Benedictus Olrik (24 May 1830 – 2 January 1890) was a Danish painter, sculptor and applied artist.

== Early life and education ==
Henrik Olrik, born in Copenhagen, was son of customs inspector Henrik Johan Ludvig Olrik and Benedicte Martinette (née Heiberg). Olrik was admitted to Royal Danish Academy of Fine Arts in 1844 where he initially studied sculpture under Herman Wilhelm Bissen, while at the same time working at the Royal Copenhagen Porcelain Factory, where he made reduced copies of Bertel Thorvaldsen works. He graduated from the Academy in 1851 after winning two silver medals for his works in 1848 and 1851.

In 1854 Olrik went to Paris to pursue his painting interests. He studied in the studio of Thomas Couture and had his first painting exhibition in 1855.

== Career as an artist ==
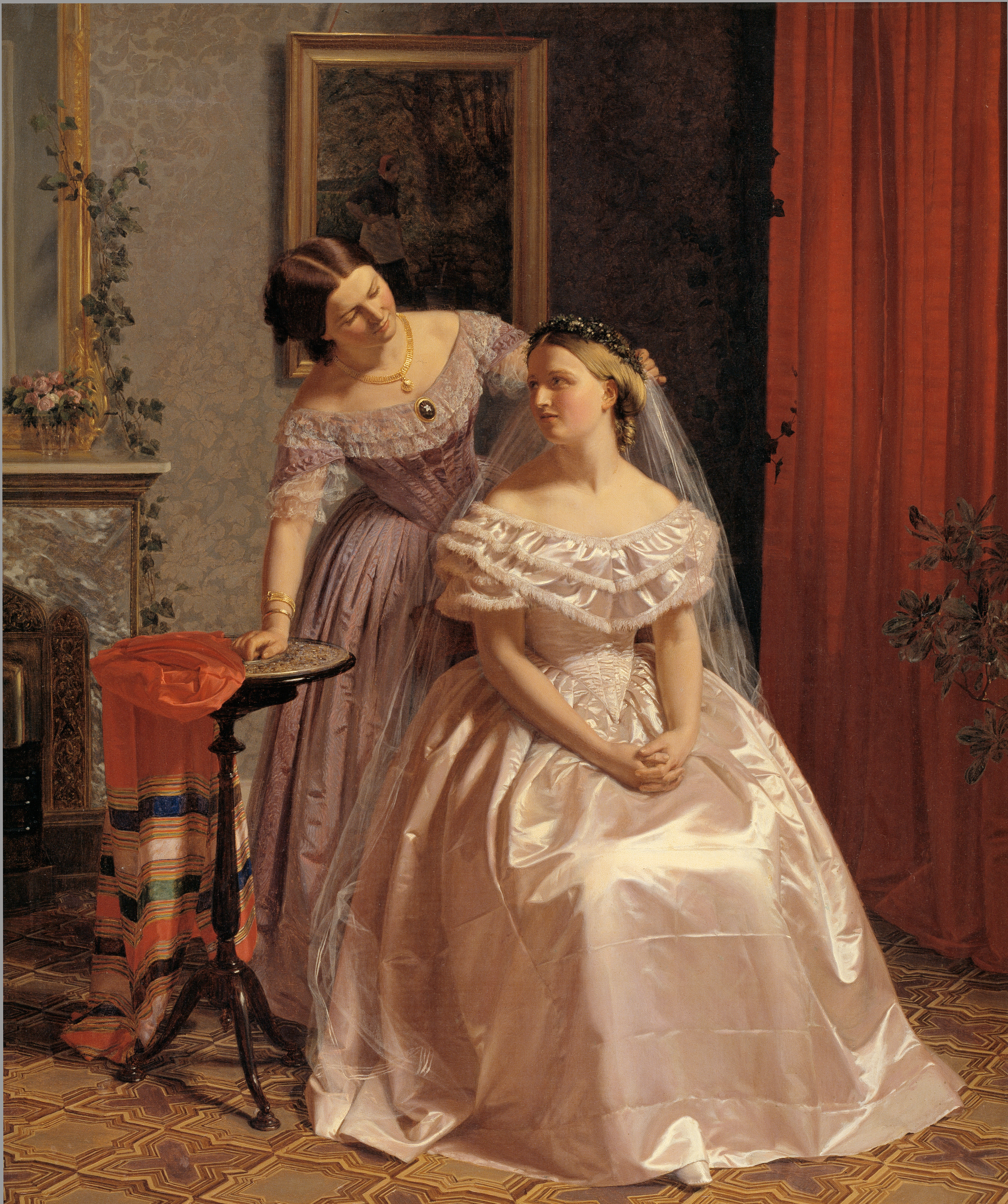
The Bride is embellished by her girl friend (1859) Danish National Gallery

After returning to Denmark in 1855, Olrik soon became recognized as a reputable portrait painter and painted portraits of a wide variety of individuals including King Christian IX of Denmark (1877) and his daughter Alexandra (1873), later the Princess of Wales as well as members of the Danish Parliament and representatives of Scandinavian high society, including Sigurd Ibsen and Henrik Ibsen.

Olrik also specialized in still lifes, landscapes, historic, and religious paintings. Some of his religious works can be found in Marble Church as well as the large altarpiece at St. Mathew's Church in Copenhagen.

In 1871, Olrik became a member of the Royal Danish Academy of Fine Arts, in 1883 professor titular, and in 1887 he was elected to Akademirådet.

== Pursuits in design and decorative arts ==
In addition to being a successful painter, Olrik was active in the field of decorative arts and design. In 1853, prior to his time in Paris, he won the Neuhausenske Prize for a silver sugar bowl

He made various design projects for numerous manufacturers including Ipsens Terrakottafabrik, the Royal Copenhagen Porcelain Factory, HC Drewsens Elektropletfabrik, Cuckoo and V. Christesens Sølvvarefabrik. His designs included items as diverse as tableware, bindings, sables and coins. He also prepared a design of a monument for Tsar Alexander II of Russia (1884).

== Private life ==
He married Hermine Valentine (1839-1917) in May 1859. They had six children; Benedicte Olrik, Dagmar Olrik, Axel Olrik, Eyvind Olrik, Hans Olrik and Jørgen Olrik. He died at Frederiksberg and was buried at Vestre Kirkegard.

== Gallery ==
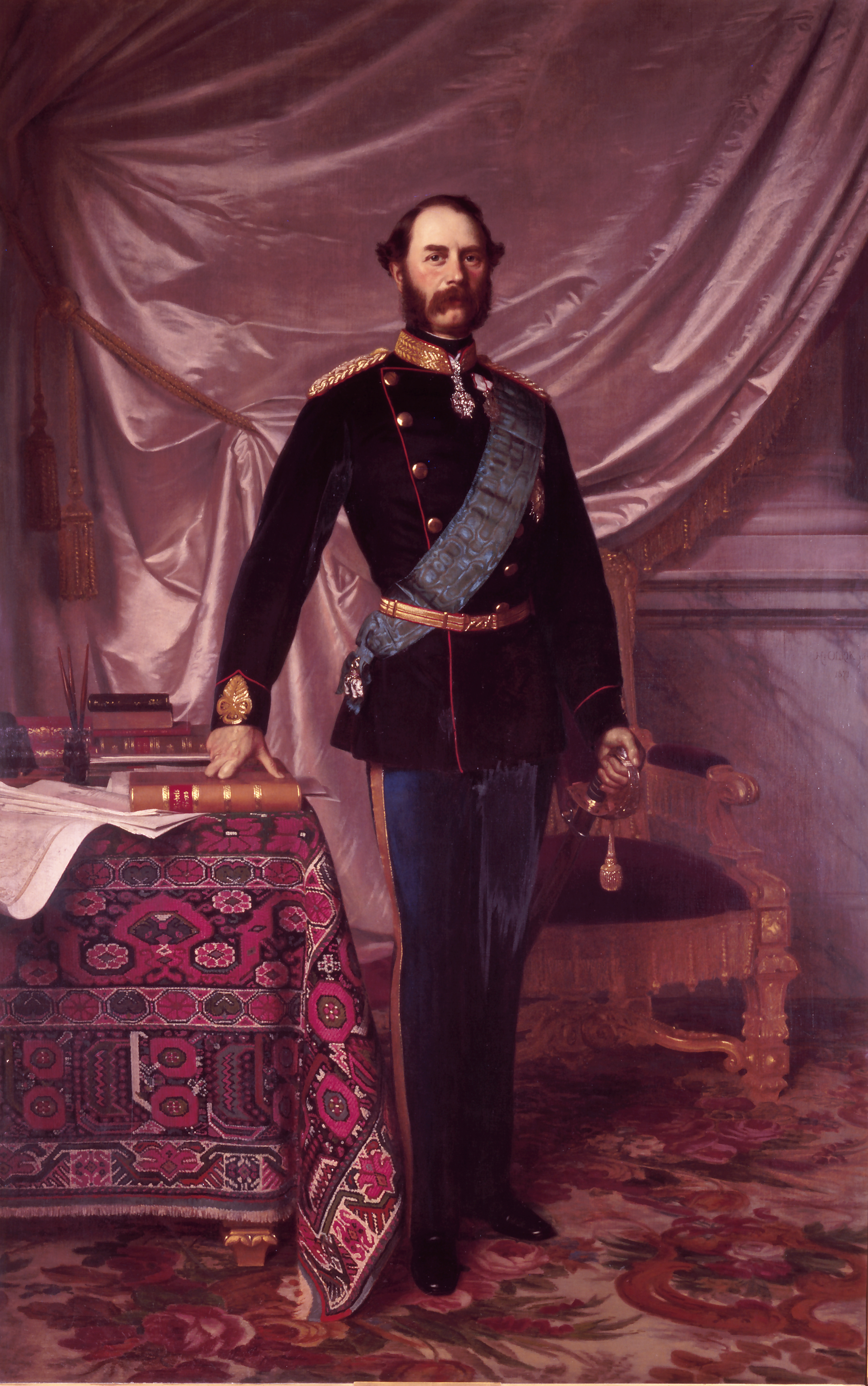
King Christian IX of Denmark (1877, Amalienborg)

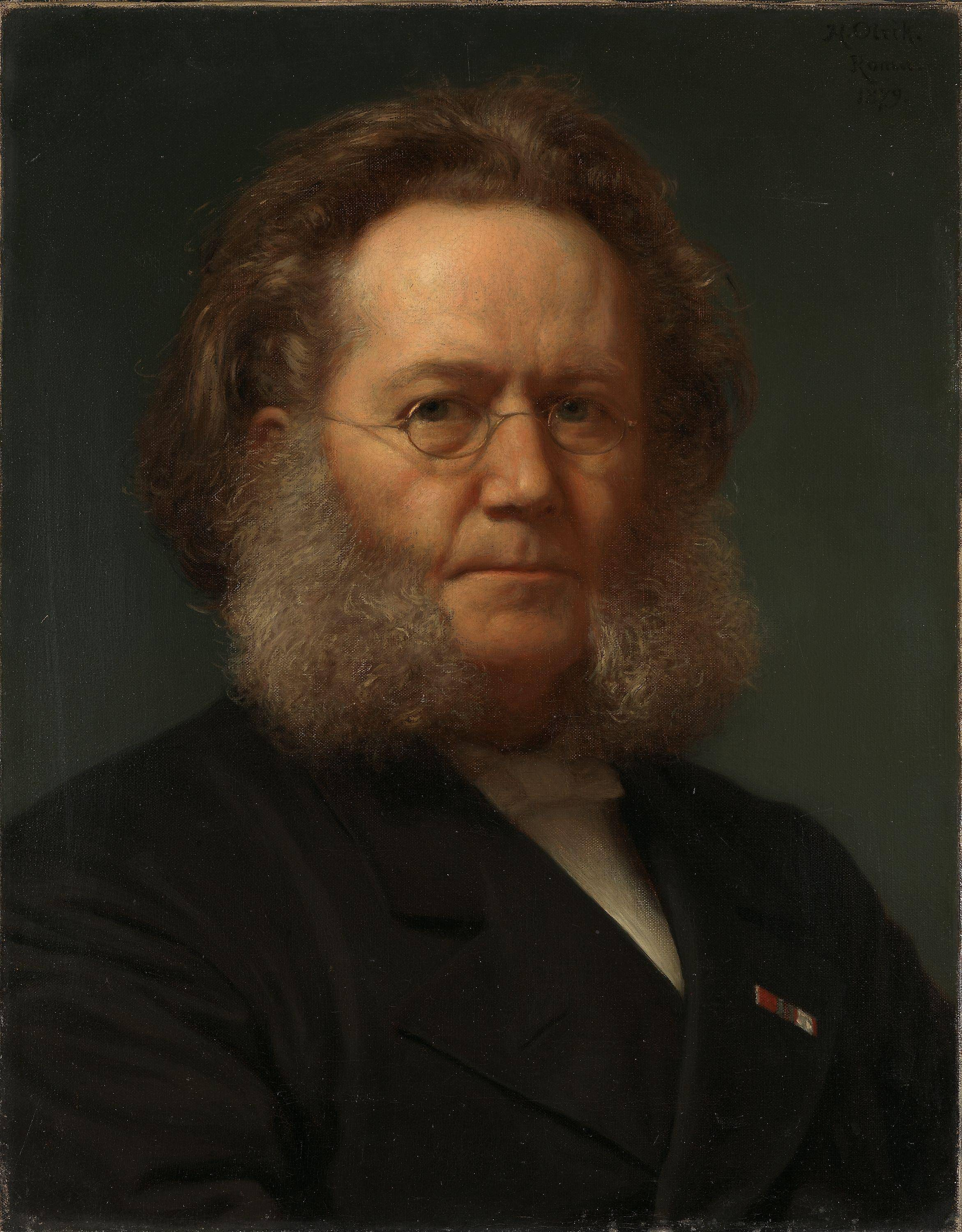
Henrik Ibsen
(1879, National Gallery. Oslo)

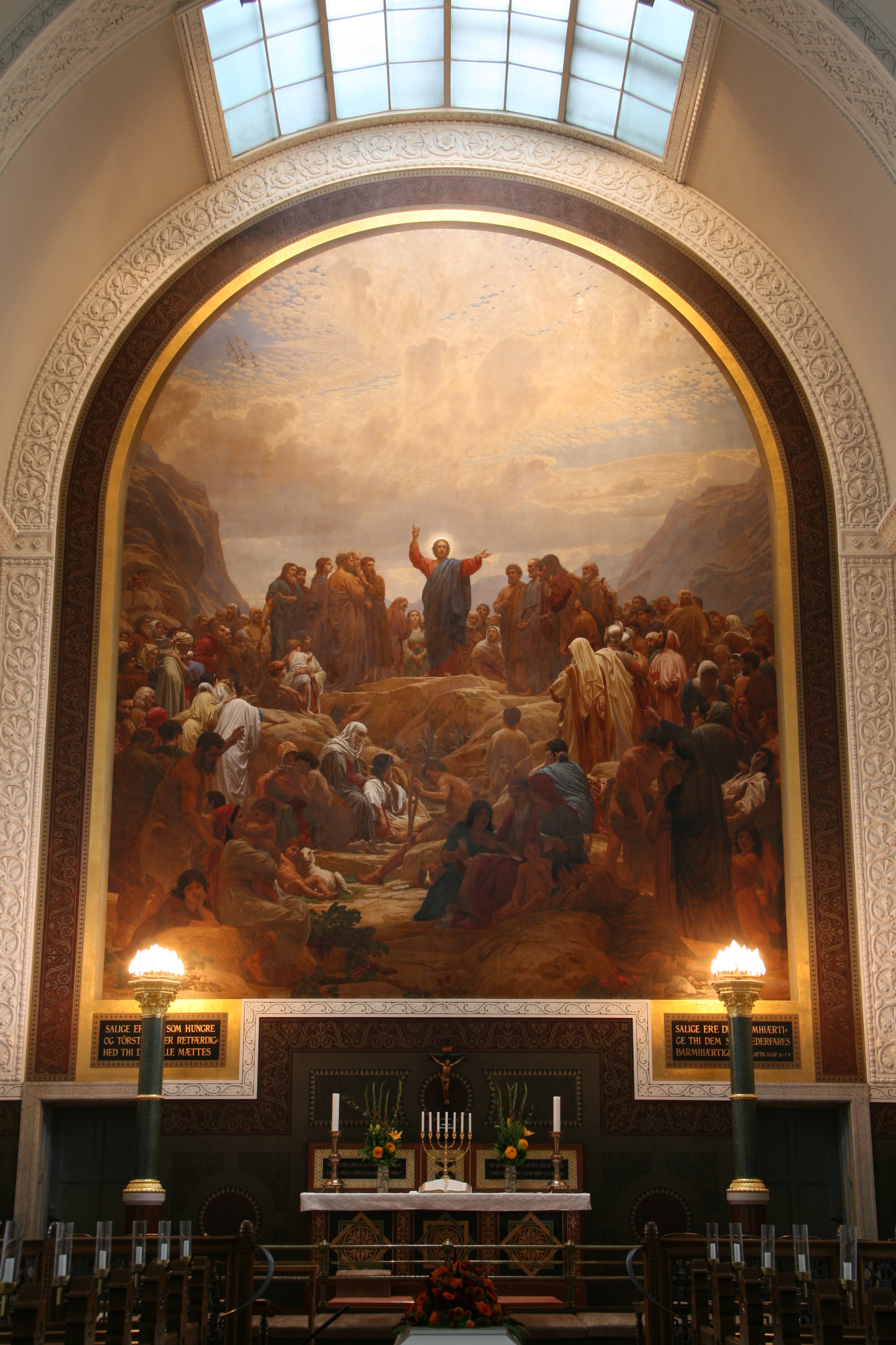
Altarpiece at St. Matthew's Church, Copenhagen

== See also ==
- Art of Denmark
