= Dagmar Olrik =

Danish artist (1860–1932)

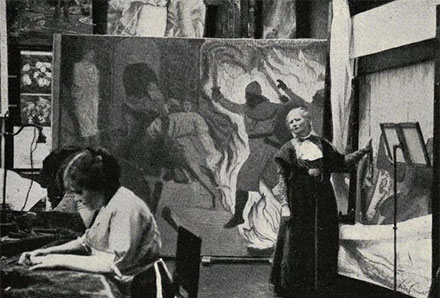
Dagmar Olrik with an assistant in Copenhagen City Hall (circa 1902)

Dagmar Olrik (1860–1932) was a Danish painter and tapestry artist. She is remembered for her weaving and tapestry work, in particular for decorating a room in Copenhagen's City Hall with tapestries based on cartoons of Nordic mythology created by Lorenz Frølich. For 18 years, she headed a group of tapestry artists in the City Hall's weaving room where the work was completed. She also restored tapestries for several Danish museums and stately homes.

== Biography ==
Born on 28 June 1860 in Copenhagen, Dagmar Olrik was the daughter of the painter Henrik Benedictus Olrik and Hermina Valentiner. She was raised with seven siblings in a household interested in culture and learning. After spending a year at the Tegne- og Kunstindustriskolen for Kvinder (Women's Art College) in 1879, she was taught by her father and later by the painter Viggo Pedersen. She first exhibited at Charlottenborg in 1893, frequently exhibiting there over the years.

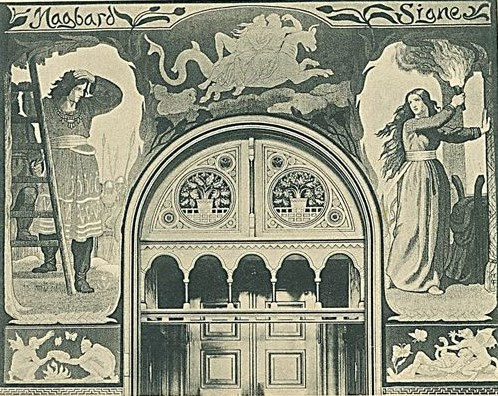
Drawing by Malthe Engelsted of one of Olrik's tapestries in Copenhagen City Hall

It was, however, tapestry which became Olrik's main interest. Already in 1986, she created a woven picture on the basis of a cartoon created by her contemporary Danish painter Johanne Frimodt. In 1900, while on a study trip around Europe, she leart the art of tapestry weaving and creation, especially in Rome and Florence. In 1902, she became head of the workshop for weaving tapestries in Copenhagen's City Hall. There, on the initiative of her brother Axel, she began to decorate the city hall with tapestries celebrating the 80th birthday of Lorenz Frølich. They were based on his illustrations of Frabricius' History of Denmark (1852). The assignment lasted a full 18 years. She also undertook tapestry repair and renovation work for the National Museum, Copenhagen University and several manor houses. Olrik became one of the leading lights in the revival of Danish interest in the art of tapestry. She also trained a number of students to assist her in her work and follow in her footsteps.

Dagmar Olrik died in Klampenborg on 22 September 1932. and buried in Copenhagen's Vestre Kirkegård.
