= P. Ipsens Enke =

Danish ceramics manufacturer

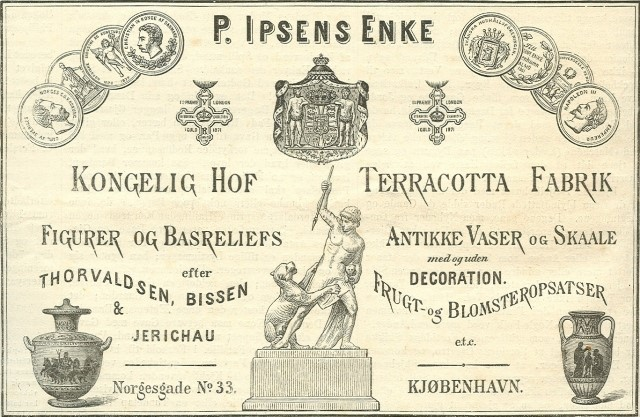
- Industry: Ceramics
- Founded: 1843
- Founder: Peter Ipsen
- Headquarters: Copenhagen, Denmark, Denmark

P. Ipsens Enke was a ceramics manufacturer based at Frederikssundsvej 78 in Copenhagen, Denmark. The company was founded by Peter Ipsen in 1843 and was continued by his widow Louise Ipsen and son Berthel Ipsen after his death in 1860. It achieved international success with its replica of antique Greek and Roman ceramics, winning awards at international expositions and opening its own shops in Paris and London. After the turn of the century, it collaborated with artists such as Thorvald Bindesbøll, WillumsenJ and Axel Salto. It closed in 1955.

== History ==
=== Early history (1843–1860) ===
Peter Ipsen (1815-1860) initially apprenticed as a joiner in his home town but gave it up as a result of poor health to become an apprentice at the Royal Porcelain Manufactury in 1833. His sharp eye for shape made him a favourite of Gustav Friedrich Hetsch. He remained at the Royal Porcelain Manufactury after completing his apprenticeship six years later.

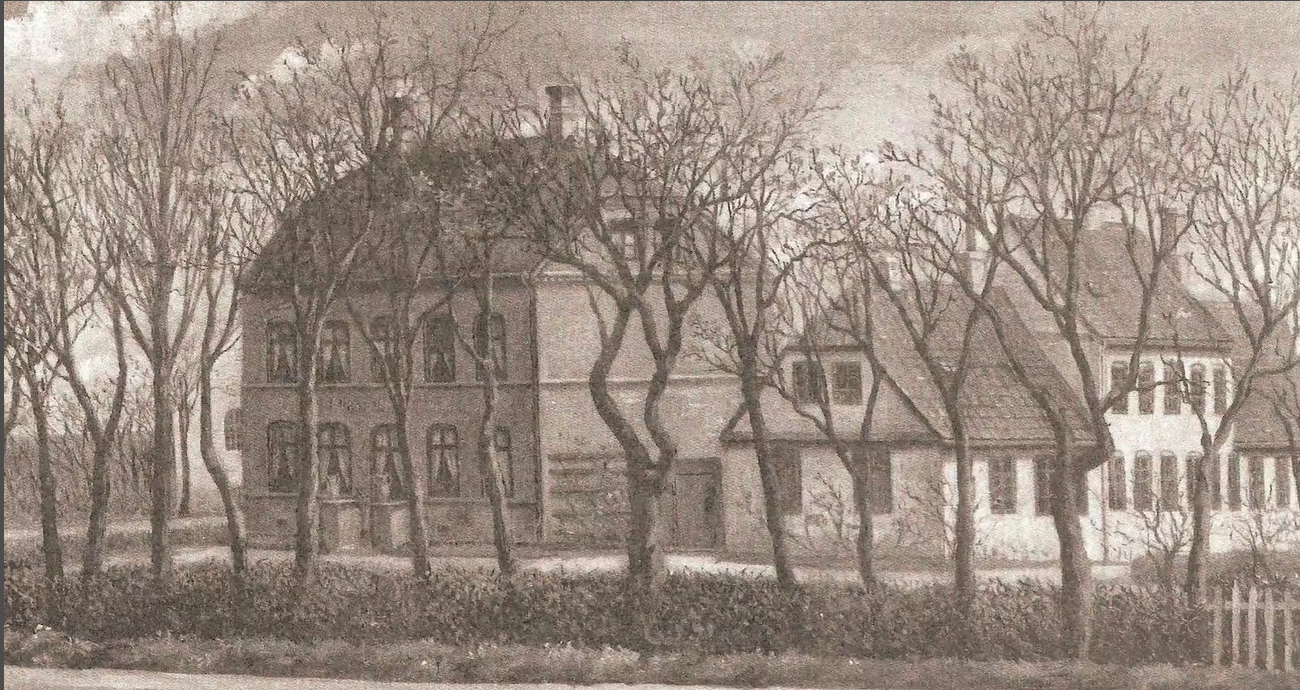
[The factory in Utterslev]

Ipsen established his own pottery on 15 April 1843 in Nørrebro. His products included flower pots, lamps, water coolers and tea sets as well as replica of antique Greek vases and vessels. He had no oven and therefore had to burn his output at the Royal Porcelain Manufactury.

Ipsen initially experienced some difficulty selling his yellow, unglazed creations to the city's many porcelain vendors but demand slowly increased and by 1847 he was able to buy a small piece of land and build a new workshop at Frederikssundsvej in Utterslev. He opened a ceramics shop at Bredgade 31 the following year. In 1852, he was represented on an exhibition at Christiansborg Riding Grounds. He had close ties to Hetsch and Henrik Olrik.

=== International success under Louise and Berthel Ipsen (1860–1900) ===
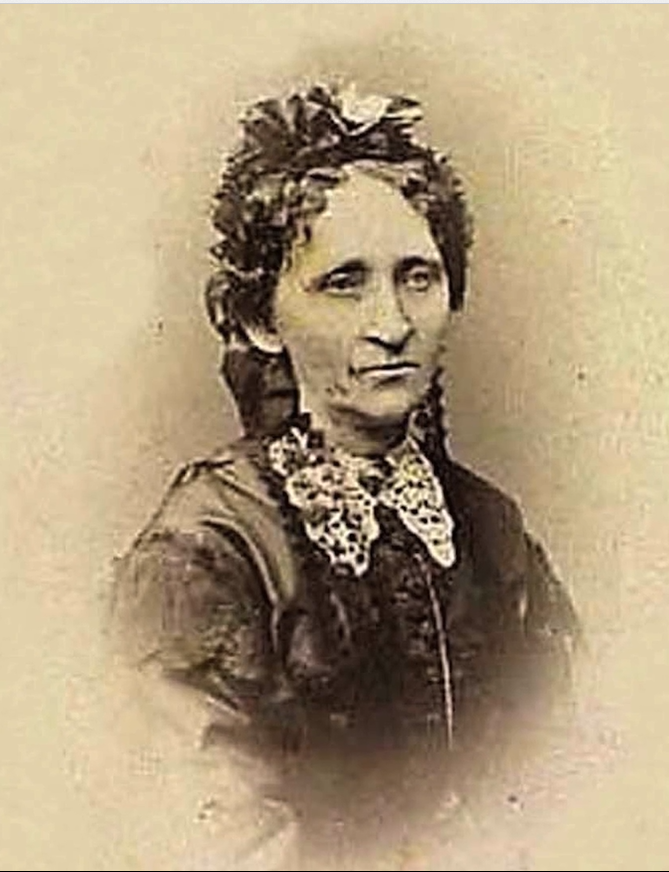
[Louise Ipsen]

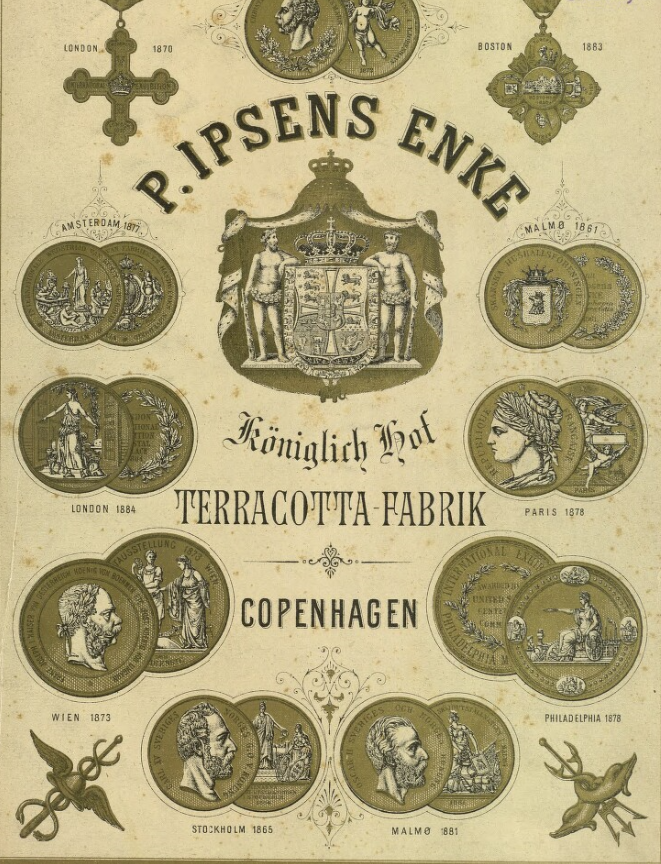
[Advertisement for the company]

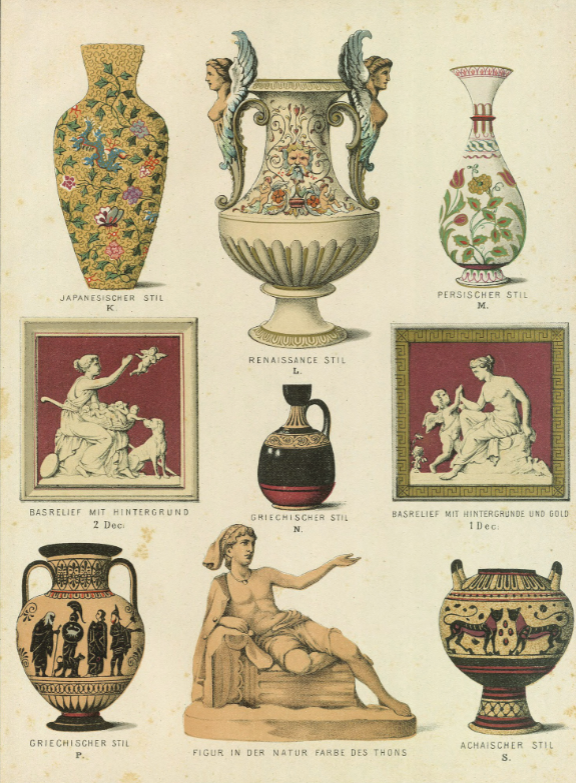
[P. Ipsens Enke products in a catalogue from 1886]

Ipsen died in 1860. His widow continued the company with Hermann Bonfils as manager. Peter and Louise Ipsen's son, Bertel Ipsen (1846-1917), became an apprentice under Bonfils om 1861. He became the formal manager of the company when Bonfils was drafted in 1865 but his mother continued to play a central role in the operations.

The company was represented on the Nordic exhibitions in Malmö in 1861 and Stockholm in 1866 and at the Exposition Universelle in Paris in 1756 and The Great Exhibition in London in 1870. In 1871, P. Ipsens Enke was granted the predicate Purveyor to the Court of Denmark. The company won a gold medal at a competition in Amsterdam in 1877.

=== 20th century ===
P. Ipsens Enke was converted into a family-owned limited company (aktieselskab) in 1895. The company began a production of glazed stoneware with more modern designs in circa 1900. It collaborated with artists and designers such as Thorvald Bindesbøll, Christian Joachim Jensen, Georg Jensen and Axel Salto.

Stender, a publishing house, acquired the company after Berthel Ipsen's death in 1917. The company acquired Dalbygård Clay Pits on Bornholm in 1920. It closed in 1955.

== Works ==
Works from P. Ipsens Enke are represented in the collections of Neue Pinakothek in München, National Museum in Stockholm, Los Angeles Museum, Cleveland Museum, Brooklyn Museum, Carnegie Institute in Pittsburgh, National Museum of Finland in Helsinki, Metropolitan Museum of Art in New York City, Danish Design Museum in Copenhagen, Les Amis des Musees de la ville de Mons in Brussels, National Arts Club in New York City and the National Museum of Latvia in Riga.

== See also ==
- Søholm Keramik
