= Aller Media =

Danish magazine publisher

- Company type: Private
- Industry: Mass media
- Founded: 1873
- Founder: Carl Aller
- Headquarters: Copenhagen, Denmark
- Key people: Bettina Aller
- Website: www.aller.dk

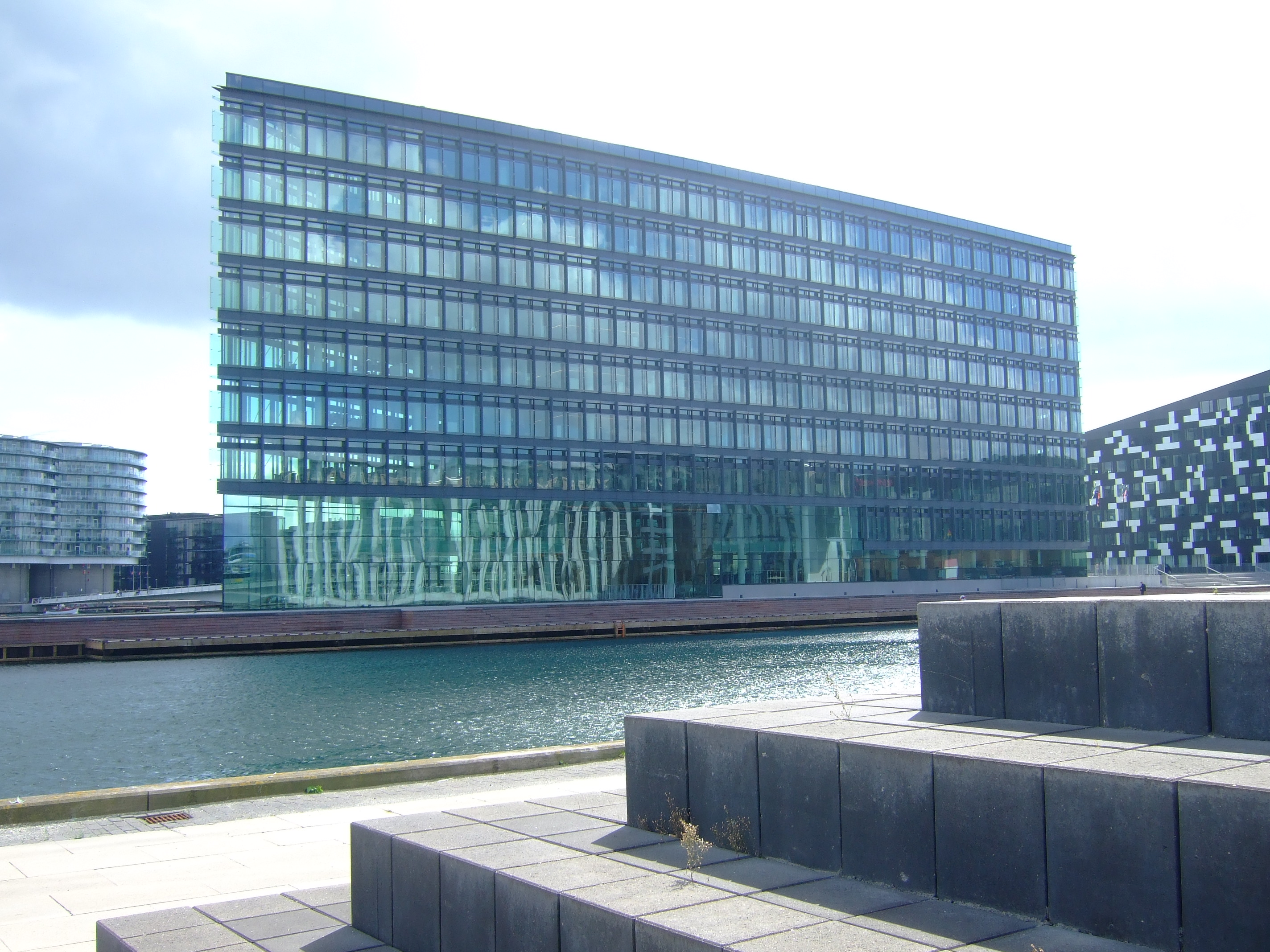
The Aller building on Havneholmen in Copenhagen

Aller Media is a magazine publisher in the Nordic countries, headquartered in Copenhagen, Denmark. It publishes Elle, Cafe, Familie Journalen, Femina, Allers and Se og Hør.

== History ==
Aller Media was founded in Copenhagen in 1873 by Carl Aller and his wife, Laura Aller. It expanded into Sweden and Norway in the 1890s and into Finland in 1992. In August 2009, Aller Press A/S changed its name to Aller Media A/S. The same year Aller moved into a new headquarters at Havneholmen. The building is designed by PLH Architects.

== Magazines and newspapers ==
Aller's publications are among the most read in Sweden. It publishes 34 magazines every month which are read by over 4 million people including the best selling magazine in Sweden as of 2004, the TV Guide Se & Hör, which is published in Norway and Denmark as Se og Hør.

Allers magazine is distributed in Norway and Sweden for the mature female market group. It traces its origins from the Danish weekly Illustreret Familie-Journal, founded in 1877 by Carl Aller. In 1894 it moved base to Helsingborg and changed its name to the Allers Family-Journal. In 1959 the name was changed to Allers Family Journal, which in 1968 was shortened to Allers. The original magazine was a pioneer in including crosswords and cartoons in magazines in Sweden. Allers is the oldest magazine still in circulation in Norway where it has been published since 1897.

In June 2013, Aller Media bought Dagbladet with online products from Berner Gruppen for reportedly about 300 million Norwegian kroner. In February 2014 the company acquired several Finnish women's and lifestyle magazines from Bonnier Group, namely Costume, Divaani and Olivia.

In Sweden, editorial offices are today (2009) located in Stockholm, Gothenburg, Helsingborg and Malmö.

In 2015 Aller Media launched L33t Magazine, an online English language publication focusing on esports and competitive video games. The team is based in Copenhagen. The company appeared to have halted publication of new articles on the L33t Magazine website after the end of 2015.

== See also ==
- List of Norwegian magazines
