= Havreholm Slot =

Coordinates: 56.0569°N 12.4278°E

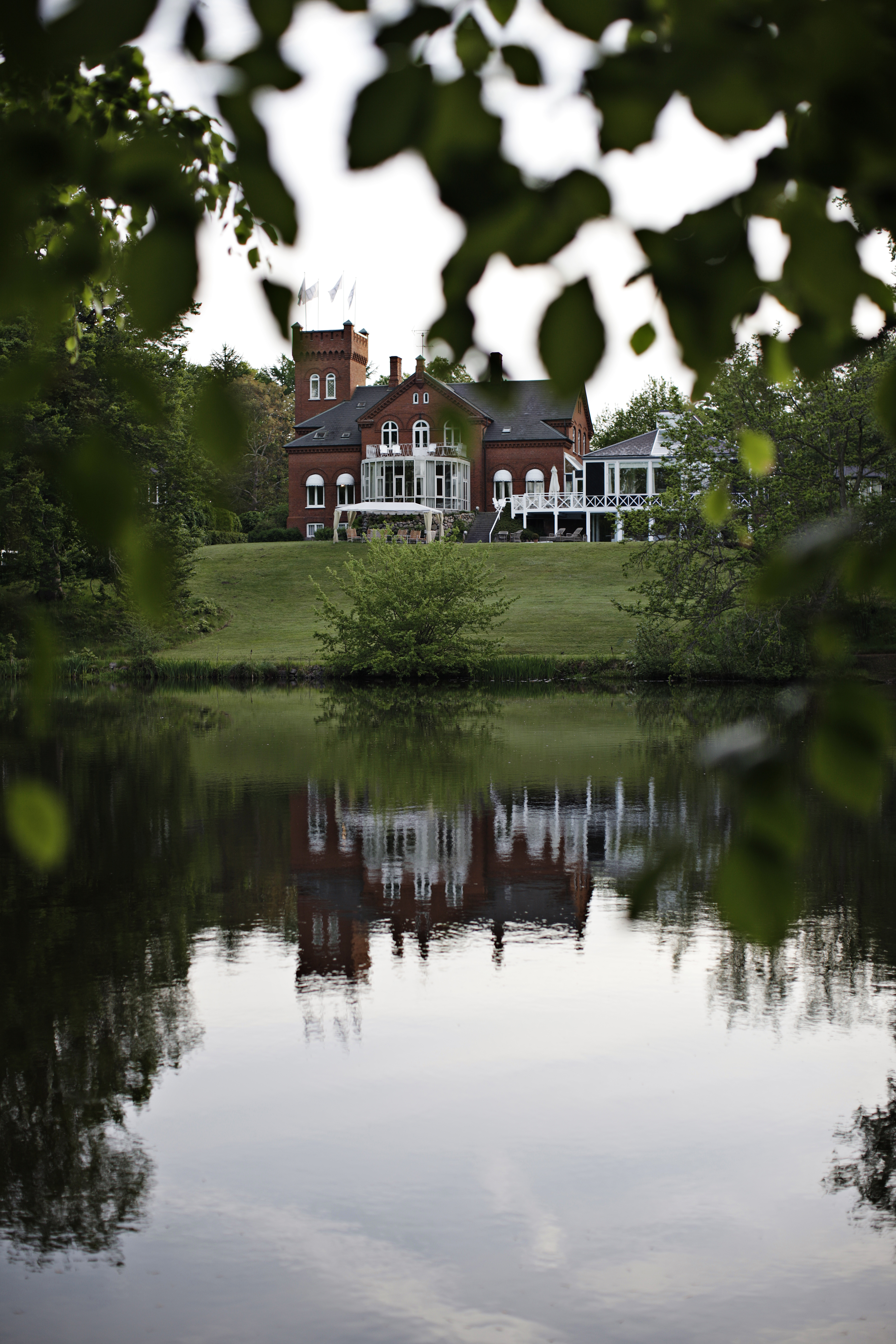
Havreholm Slot

Havreholm Slot is a hotel and conference centre located south of Hornbæk, Helsingør Municipality, some 40 km north of Copenhagen, Denmark. It was originally built as a private residence for the owner of a local paper mill. The estate covers 30 hectares of parkland and forest and borders Hornbæk Golf Course.

== History ==
=== Origins ===
The village of Havreholm is first mentioned in 1178 as Hauerholm. In 1497, it consisted of six farms. In 1681, it consisted of six farms and three houses and in 1747 of six farms and seven houses. The adjacent Gurre Stream was from at least the 16th century used for milling. A water mill is mentioned in 1555 and was later and until 1817 used as a sharpening mill in association with the small arms factory in Hellebæk.

=== F. Culmsee & Søn ===
Johan Thomas Culmsee established a water and steam powered paper mill at the site in 1842. His son Frederik L. Culmsee later took over the factory. The writer and painter Holger Drachmann, a friend of his son Valdemar, visited the house in 1866. He entered into a relationship with his daughter Polly and later married his daughter Emmy. Emmy Drachmann's novel Inger (1910) is a fictional account of their marriage which she has also described in her memoir.

Valdemar Culmsee took over the management of the paper mill when his father moved to Kristiania with the rest of the family in 1756. He replaced the old house with the current main building in 1872. It was built to an opulent Historicist design which soon gave it the name "Slottet" (The Castle") among the locals.

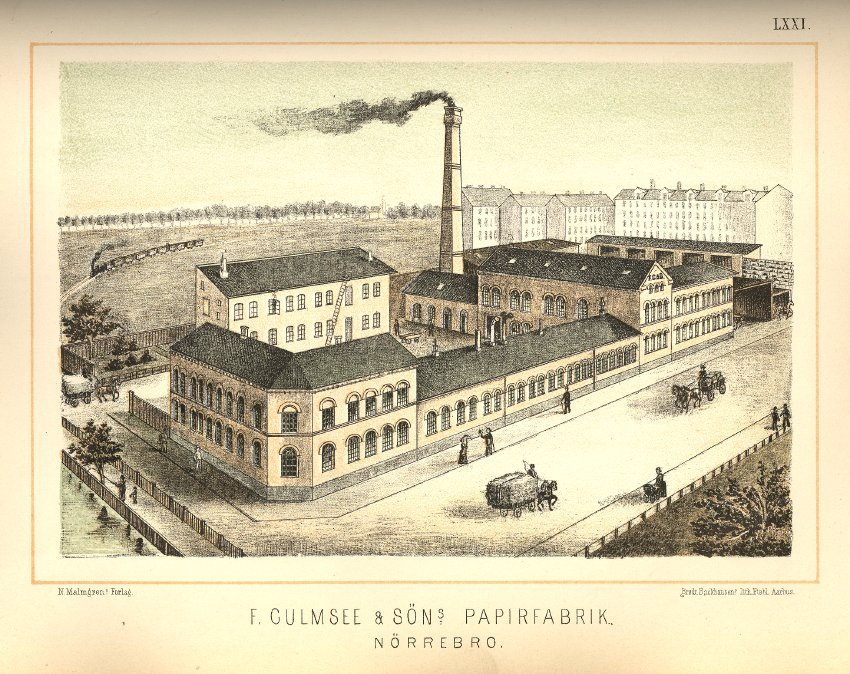
F. Culmsee & Søn's paper factory F. in Nørrebro.

Havreholm Paper Factory was relatively small and poorly located. The water power from Gurre stream was at the same time not sufficient to power an expansion of the paper mill and Culmsee therefore decided to construct a new paper factory in Copenhagen. In 1874, Nørrebro Paper Factory opened at Aaboulevard.

Havreholm was from then on continued as a branch of the principal factory site in Copenhagen. The writer Henrik Pontoppidan rented the house in 1886 and his son was born there the following year. The paper factory closed in 1889. The buildings were then used for producing wooden products but the factory burned in 1897 and was later rebuilt in a more strategic location near Kvistgaard railway station. All remains of the industrial buildings were removed in 1910.

=== Later history ===
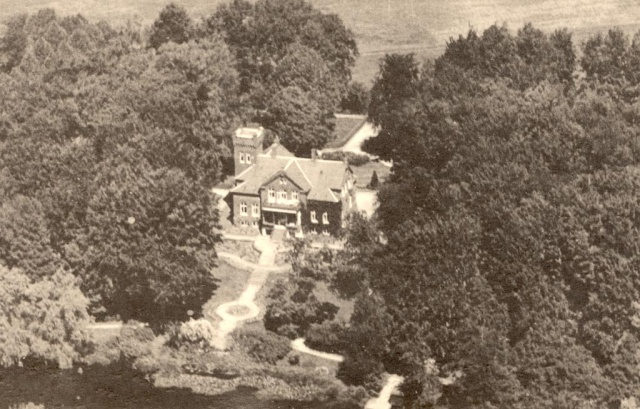
Havreholm Slot

The residence remained unaffected by the fire. In 1911, it was purchased by Holger Jantzen, the owner of a sugar factory on Java. He expanded the property through the acquisition of more land and laid out a large park. The Jantzen family owned Havreholm House for 70 years.In the 1980s, a company had plans to convert the property into a country club. They renovated the main building and upgraded the facilities before abandoning their plans in 1989. The new owner, Inge Correll, backed up by an insurance company as investor, converted the property into a hotel. The hotel went bankrupt in 2009. It subsequently reopened with new owners.

== Interior ==
Holger Jantzen commissioned Joakim Skovgaard to decorate the Garden Hall. He created six large and six smaller murals, depicting the Genesis creation narrative. It took Skovgaard three years to complete the works which were exhibited at Den Frie Udstilling, Charlottenborg and in Stockholm prior to their installation in Havreholm. The ceiling is decorated with the 12 signs of the Zodiac surrounded by figures representing the four seasons.

== See also ==
- F. Culmsee & Søn
