= Vilhelm Topsøe =

Danish novelist and journalist

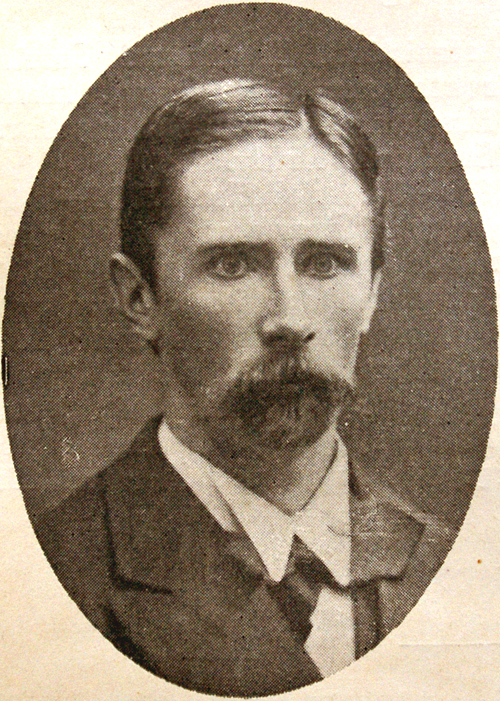
Vilhelm Topsøe

Vilhelm Christian Sigurd Topsøe (5 October 1840 – 11 July 1881) was a Danish novelist and journalist. He is remembered in particular for Jason med det gyldne Skind (Jason and the Golden Fleece, 1875) and Nutidsbilleder (Images of Today, 1878).

== Biography ==
Born in Skælskør in the west of Zealand, Topsøe attended the cathedral school in Roskilde before moving with his mother to Copenhagen where he matriculated from the Metropolitan School in 1859. He went on to study law, graduating in 1865, but while a student also contributed to the Familiekarakteristikker (Family Characteristics) column in the daily newspaper Dagbladet. In 1863, he published a humorous weekly paper Sværmere (Swarms) in which he wrote satirical political parodies from his national liberal viewpoint. He continued to work for Dagbladet where he became the parliamentary correspondent under the editor Carl Steen Andersen Bille (1828–1898). In 1870, he travelled to Geneva and Paris which led to his Fra Schweitz og Frankrig. Rejseskildringer af politisk og socialt Indhold (From Switzerland and France: Political and Social Impressions) and the following year to North America writing Fra America (From America, published 1872). In 1872, he became the editor of Dagbladet. He maintained the post for nine years until he died unexpectedly in 1881 while on holiday in Skodsborg north of Copenhagen

His novels, Jason med det gyldne Skind (Jason and the Golden Fleece, 1875), Nutidsbilleder (Images of Today, 1878) and the collection of short stories Fra Studiebogen (From the Study Book, 1879) were all published anonymously. His work was acclaimed by Herman Bang and Vilhelm Andersen.

== Literature ==
- Andersen, Vilhelm. Vilhelm Topsøe: et bidrag til den danske realismes historie. Gad: Copenhagen (1922) (in Danish)
