= Familie Journal =

Danish women's magazine

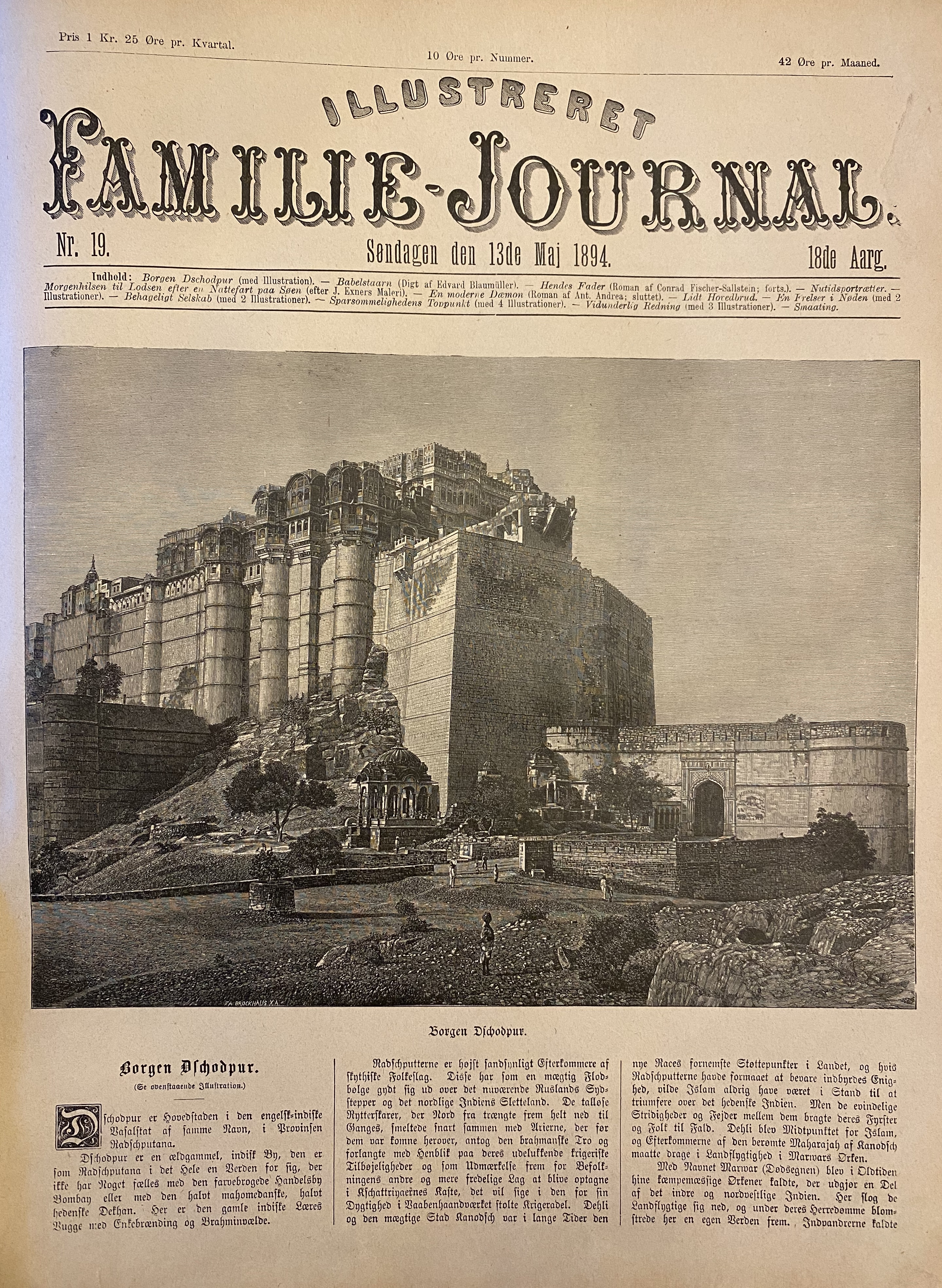
- Cover page dated 13 May 1894
- Categories: Family magazine; Women's magazine
- Frequency: Weekly
- Publisher: Aller Press
- Founder: Carl Aller
- Founded: 1877; 149 years ago
- Company: Aller Media
- Country: Denmark
- Based in: Copenhagen
- Language: Danish
- Website: Familie Journalen

Familie Journal is a weekly family and women's magazine published in Copenhagen, Denmark. Launched in 1877, the magazine is one of the oldest publications in the country. It was also published in Norway and Sweden.

== History and profile ==
The magazine was started as a family-oriented weekly by Carl Aller in 1877 under the name Illustreret Familie-Journal. In 1938 Børge Michelsen was appointed the science editor of the magazine. It is part of Aller, a subsidiary of Aller Holding A/S, and is published by Aller Press on a weekly basis. It has its headquarters in Copenhagen. In the early years the magazine was read by petit-bourgeois. The magazine targets women over forty who are primarily from lower social classes.

Familie Journal has editions in Norway and Sweden. The Swedish version was launched in 1879 with the name Illustrerad Familij Journal. Its Norwegian version was launched in 1897.

== Content ==
A play by the Swedish author Victoria Benedictsson entitled I Telefon (Swedish: On Telephone) was serialized in Familie Journalen in 1887. It was an early example of the avant-garde Nordic theatre work. From 1938 science editor Børge Michelsen published articles on new inventions and science oddities in the magazine. The magazine and its Swedish and Norwegian editions covered fiction material which was edited by Erling Poulsen from 1953 and 1964. The frequent topics covered in Familie Journal include sewing and knitting, cooking and baking.

A popular correspondence column, called Små hverdags problemer (Danish: Small everyday problems) was run by writer and journalist Edith Rode from 1937 to 1956 and then up to 1976 by writer and poet Tove Ditlevsen.

== Circulation ==
Familie Journal sold 100,000 copies in 1885. In around 1900 the circulation of the magazine rose to 200,000 copies in Denmark.

In 2001 the circulation of Familie Journal was 237,000 copies. During the last six months of 2003 the magazine had a circulation of 228,000 copies, making it the best-selling general interest magazine in the country. Its circulation was 198,300 copies during the last six months of 2007. The magazine had a circulation of 178,208 copies in 2010. It fell to 167,919 copies in 2011 and to 163,048 copies in 2012. Its circulation was 160,000 copies in 2013.

== See also ==
- List of magazines in Denmark
