= Finn Andersen (officeholder) =

Danish politician

Finn Andersen (born 22 February 1944) is a Danish cultural advocate and organizer. He is the former Secretary General of the Danish Cultural Institute and leader of the Danish Cultural Institutes of Russia and Great Britain. Andersen is an organizer of intercultural exchange programs between Denmark and countries around the world including the UK, China, Russia, Brazil and India. He is an advocate for Danish music, theatre, literature, dance, art, and education programs and has promoted the arts and the humanities as foundational to society and human understanding.

== Education ==
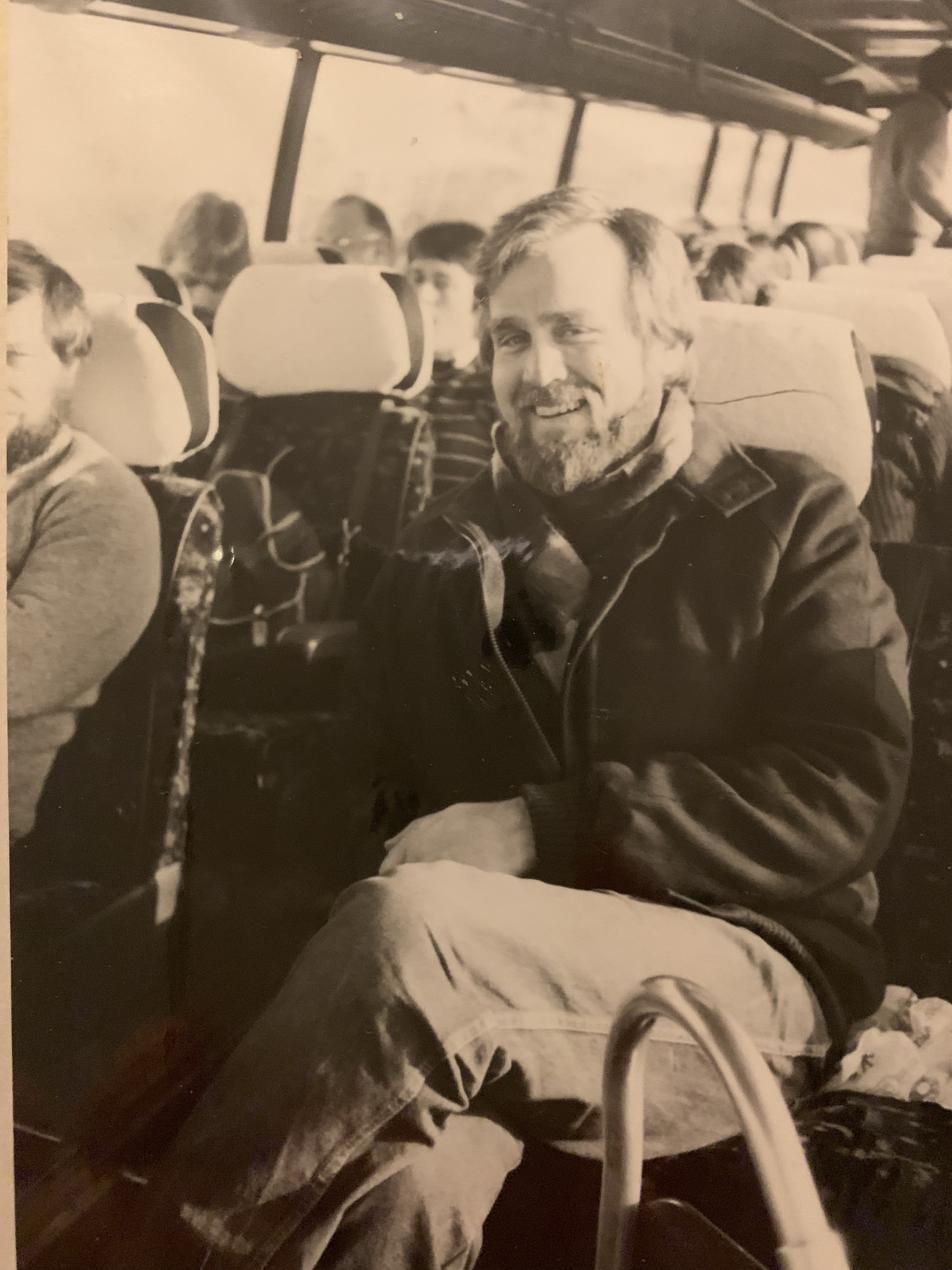
Andersen during his time as a teacher.

Andersen attended Viborg Katedralskole, and later attended Aarhus University, where he was awarded a M.A. He has also received a M.Sc. from Heriot-Watt University and an honorary DLit from Napier University.

== Career ==
Andersen began his career as an English teacher at Kalø Højskole (1968–84). He then became Director of The Danish Cultural Institute for Great Britain in Edinburgh (1985–97). He returned to Denmark as Secretary General of The Danish Cultural Institute, Copenhagen (1997–2013).

Andersen later moved to Russia to become Director of The Danish Cultural Institute for Russia in St. Petersburg (2014–17). In 2019, he co-authored Vitus Bering Teatret og dansk-russiske kulturforbindelser, a book on Danish-Russian cultural relations.

He was Adjunct Professor at Aalborg University from 2006–11. He helped to form and was later President of EUNIC from 2009–10. Andersen's career focused on fostering cultural dialogue to encourage mutual understanding.

Andersen received the Order of the Knight of Dannebrog.

== Personal life ==
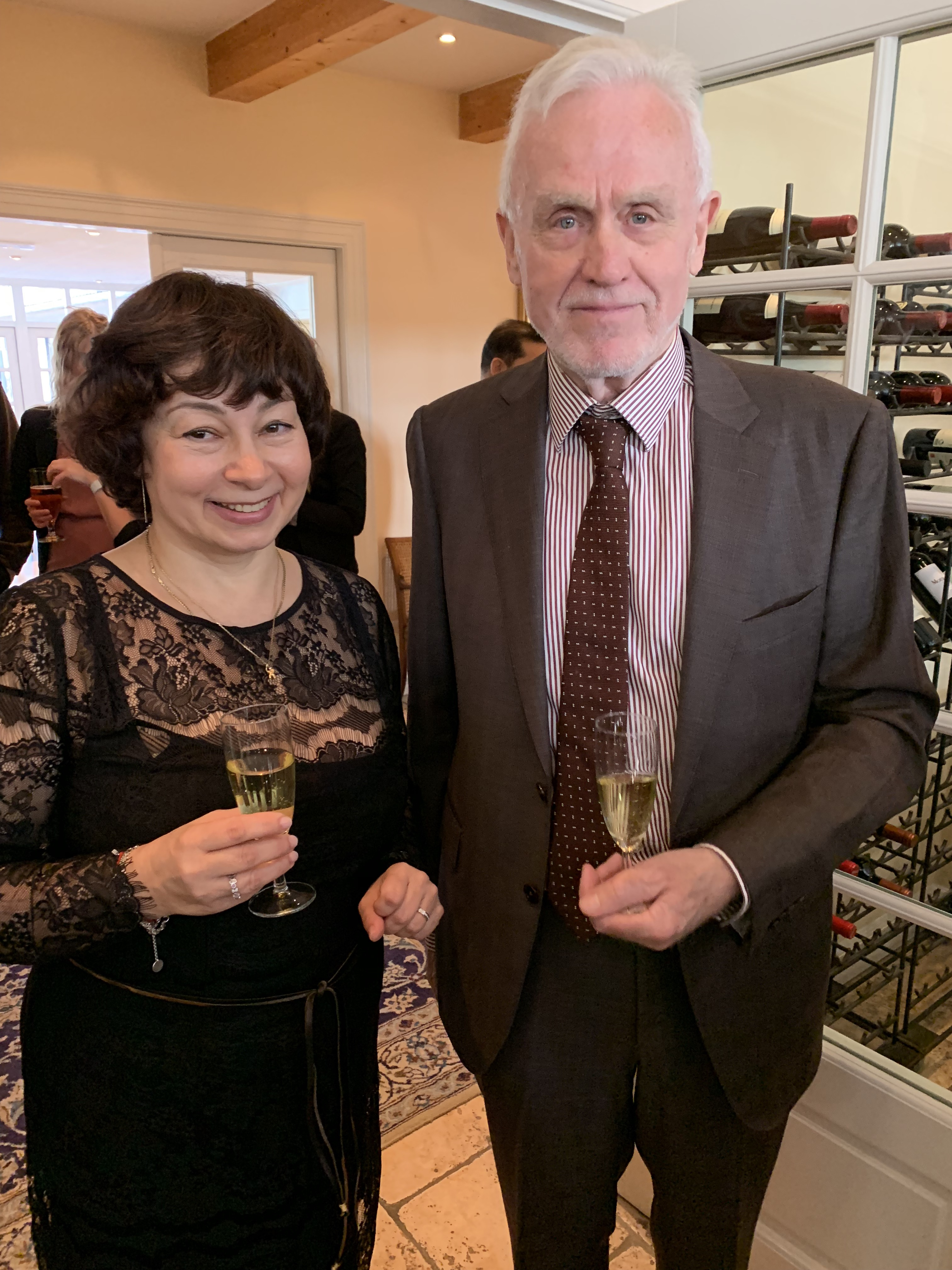
Andersen and wife, Elena, on the occasion of Andersen's 75th birthday.

Andersen grew up on Mosegaard farm in Vejrum Noerremark, close to the town of Viborg, Denmark. He is the grandson of Anders and Laursine Andersen, and the oldest son of Kristen Dahl Andersen (born1909) and Sofie Andersen. He has a younger brother, Anders Andersen, and two older sisters Jenny (deceased) and Grethe. Andersen attended Viborg Katedralskole, and later attended Aarhus University.

In 1973, Andersen married British-born Vivien Andersen (née Hahn, born 15 June 1946), then a British Tourism Officer, and the couple lived in Rønde. Their two children, Anne-Sofie Hahn Andersen (born 3 November 1977) and Simon Michael Hahn Andersen (born 3 June 1980, died 22 July 2014) were born in Grenaa. In 1984, Andersen moved to Edinburgh to run an outpost of the Danish Cultural Institute. Andersen and Vivien ran the Danish Scottish Society in Scotland from the Institute building. Andersen and Vivien divorced in 2001.

In 2007, Andersen married Russian-born Elena Z. Andersen (born 6 April 1961), then working at the Danish Consulate General in St. Petersburg. Andersen has a stepson, Pavel Stolypin, and a step-granddaughter, Dasha Stolypin. Andersen lives together with his wife, Elena, north of Copenhagen, Denmark.

Andersen's daughter, Anne-Sofie, is married to Paul Berger. He has two grandchildren, Ella Elizabeth Andersen Berger (born 8 November 2009) and Kaja Sylvia Andersen Berger (born 8 June 2012).
