= Johannes Ebert =

German cultural manager (born 1963)

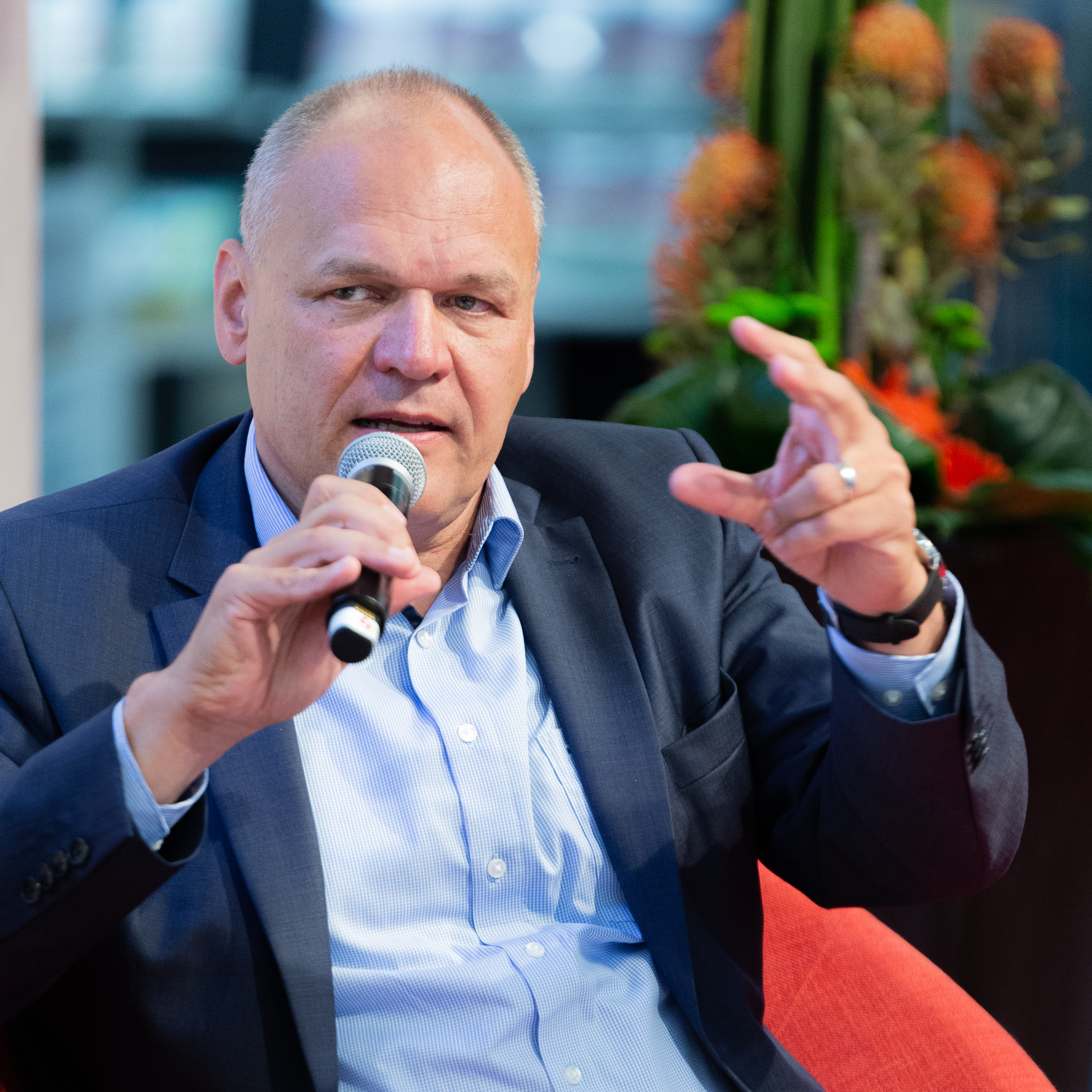
- Born: 1963 (age 62–63); Ulm, West Germany
- Education: University of Freiburg
- Occupation: former Secretary General of the German Cultural Institute
- Years active: 1991–present
- Employer(s): Goethe-Institut, Munich
- Known for: Intercultural cultural management

Johannes Ebert (born 1963 in Ulm, West Germany) is a German cultural manager with an academic background in Islamic studies and political science. He has held senior postions at the German cultural organization Goethe-Institut in Kyiv, Moscow and Cairo. From 2012 to 2026 he served as secretary general at the head office of the Goethe-Institut in Munich.

== Life and career ==
After graduating from the Gymnasium in Weißenhorn, Ebert spent a year studying Arabic in Damascus, Syria, and later graduated in Islamic Studies and Political Science at the University of Freiburg im Breisgau.

=== Career with the Goethe-Institut ===
Before joining the Goethe-Institut in 1991, Ebert worked as journalist at the newspaper Heilbronner Stimme. After assignments at the Goethe-Institut in Riga, Latvia, and the institute's headquarters in Munich, he was director of the Goethe-Institut in Kyiv, Ukraine, from 1997 to 2002. From 2002 to 2007 he was head of the Goethe-Institut in Cairo, Egypt, and regional director of the institute's North Africa/Middle East region. Following this, he was director of the Goethe-Institut in Moscow and the Eastern Europe/Central Asia region from 2007 to 2012. From March 2012 until July 2026, Ebert served as secretary general of the worldwide Goethe-Institut network. In October 2026, Ebert started his new position as director of the Goethe-Institut in Athens, Greece, and as Europe I regional director.

As secretary general of the institute, Ebert was an official member of several cultural institutions, including the advisory board of the German Academic Exchange Service, the Institute for Foreign Cultural Relations (ifa), the Foundation for the International Youth Library, as well as of the Villa Aurora & Thomas Mann House in Los Angeles, USA. Further, he was a member of the advisory board of the German Football Association cultural foundation and of the University of Music and Theater Munich. For two years, he was on the board of directors of the European Union National Institutes of Culture (EUNIC), and served as its president from 2022 to 2023. In a 2012 interview about the cooperation of European cultural institutes such as the British Council, the Institut français, the Goethe-Institut, the Instituto Cervantes and others, Ebert said that these organizations are obviously promoting national cultural and educational policies, but should also strengthen shared European identities and awareness of civil society. Regarding the economic benefits of creative industries, he cautioned that not all results can be quantified in monetary terms and that the benefits of many cultural projects can only be seen in a long-term perspective.

=== Statements about cultural diplomacy ===
During his tenure as secretary general of the institute, Ebert emphasized the role of cultural rights and freedom of expression as part of an individual's human rights including unrestricted access to cultural centres worldwide. This includes reliable relations with artists, intellectuals and the civil society at large. In the wake of the 2025–2026 protests in Turkey, Ebert stressed the important role of Turkish cultural workers, who "are using their visibility and their platforms to express themselves publicly."

In his 2013 article "Preventing Conflict through Cultural and Educational Exchange", published during Ebert's time in Cairo, he defined the basic notions of the institute's approach to a "Dialogue with Islam", a general name for activities in the region of NorthAfrica and Middle East. First, he specified that "a real dialogue is only possible between individuals and not between religions or ideologies." Second, Ebert pointed out that "the societies of the East are as complex as those of the West." He further stated that Islamic religion is only one among other aspects of the individual identities of, for example, Egyptians, Lebanese or Indonesians. According to Ebert, "to stress Islam as the major feature in these identities creates a distorted picture in the tradition of Edward Saids concept of "Orientalism".

Speaking with the Egyptian newspaper Al Ahram, Ebert pointed out that the institute has successfully promoted cultural activities for young people, including when a Goethe bus travelled to universities and schools to teach German words about football to young Egyptians as "an attractive and entertaining way into the German language." - As Ebert said, all of the institute's activities were aiming at an "exchange of beliefs and values" and not at blurring differences in attitudes or opinions.

As the Goethe-Institut in Damascus had to close because of the Syrian civil war, the Berlin branch of the institute organized a series of public events in 2016 named "Goethe-Institut Damascus in Exile". Many Syrian refugees having fled to Germany, Ebert said this project aimed at connecting Syrian and German artists and audiences in order to present the ongoing cultural expressions of the Syrian diaspora. At an exhibition commemorating the persecutions of Jews in Nazi Germany, Ebert stressed the importance of remembering The Holocaust, including through centres for international cultural education at five of the Goethe-Institutes in Germany.

== Selected publications ==
as editor

- with Olaf Zimmermann et al. (eds.): AKBP - Auswärtige Kultur- und Bildungspolitik: Ein Rückblick zu Ehren von Klaus-Dieter Lehmann. Deutscher Kulturrat, 2020.
- with Klaus-Dieter Lehmann, Andreas Ströhl, Nikolai Blaumer (eds.): Teilen und Tauschen. S. Fischer Verlage, 2017.
- with Andrea Zell (eds.): Klima Kunst Kultur. Der Klimawandel in Kunst und Kulturwissenschaften. 2014.
- with Ronald Grätz (eds.): Menschenrechte und Kultur. Das Menschenrecht auf Kultur. 2014.
- with Günther Hasenkamp, Johannes Odenthal, Sarah Rifky, Stefan Winkler (eds.): Positionen 7: Zeitgenössische Künstler Arabische Welt. 2013.
- MIDAD – das deutsch-arabische Stadtschreiberprojekt. Palmyra-Verlag, 2007.

as author

- Freier leben – weltweit. In Bernecker, Roland, Ronald Grätz (eds.): Kultur und Freiheit – Beschreibung einer Krise, Steidl, 2021.
- Starke Strukturen, kreative Ansätze und große Aufgaben in der Zukunft. Die Förderung der deutschen Sprache durch das Goethe-Institut in Russland. In Ammon, Ulrich/Kemper, Dirk (eds.): Die deutsche Sprache in Russland. Geschichte, Gegenwart, Zukunftsperspektiven. 2011.
- Ebert, Johannes (2006). "Unity in Diversity: Who is doing What in German Educational and Cultural Politics Abroad?". In Warner, Nils (ed.). Mediterranean Sea - Gap Or Bridge?: Perspectives on Cooperation in Education and Scholarship Between Germany and the Arab World ; 10th Conference Trialoge of Cultures, GTZ-Haus, Berlin, September 12-13, 2005. Societäts Verlag. ISBN 978-3-7973-0993-8.
