= Qantara.de =

German internet portal for dialogue with the Islamic world

- Website type: Islamic World/International relations
- Available in: English, German, Arabic
- Owner: German Institute for Foreign Cultural Relations
- Website: www.qantara.de
- Commercial: No
- Registration: No
- Launched: March, 2003
- Current status: Online

Qantara.de (Classical Arabic: قنطرة qanṭarah, meaning 'bridge') is an Internet portal in German, English, and Arabic, produced by the German Institute for Foreign Cultural Relations in order to promote intercultural dialogue between the Western and Islamic worlds. The portal was formerly produced by Deutsche Welle.

== History ==
Online since March 2003, the portal was founded on the initiative of the German Foreign Office, in reaction to the September 11 attacks in the U.S with the intention to provide a platform for intercultural and interreligious dialogue between the Western and Islamic world. It also cooperates with the Federal Agency for Civic Education (bpb), Deutsche Welle (DW), Goethe-Institut (GI) and the German Institute for Foreign Cultural Relations (ifa).

The portal presents journalistic articles about politics, society, culture and photographic essays by Western and Muslim authors, who seek open and respectful discussion of both communities, including controversial subjects. These have included contributors such as the Egyptian literary scholar Nasr Hamid Abu Zaid, the German former diplomat and Muslim Murad Hofmann, the conflict researcher Heiner Bielefeldt and the physicist Ernst Ulrich von Weizsäcker.

=== Restructuring ===
The portal was restructured and placed under the control of the German Institute for Foreign Cultural Relations starting July 2024, prompting the editorial team to resign claiming it left them "unable to guarantee editorial independence". The portal had previously published articles and interviews critical of the debate within Germany concerning anti-semitism in the context of the Gaza war, but the foreign office denied that the restructure was related to the portal's recent content. An open letter signed by 35 Qantara authors in response to the restructure wrote:

"We see a real danger that a project which allows diversity of opinion and occasionally questions German foreign and cultural policy in its debates will effectively be shut down...The fact that the Qantara editorial team assumes that the portal will no longer be able to function as a critical, non-governmental, and independent medium if it is integrated into the ifa underlines the justification for our concerns."
