= Camilla Mordhorst =

Danish museum professional

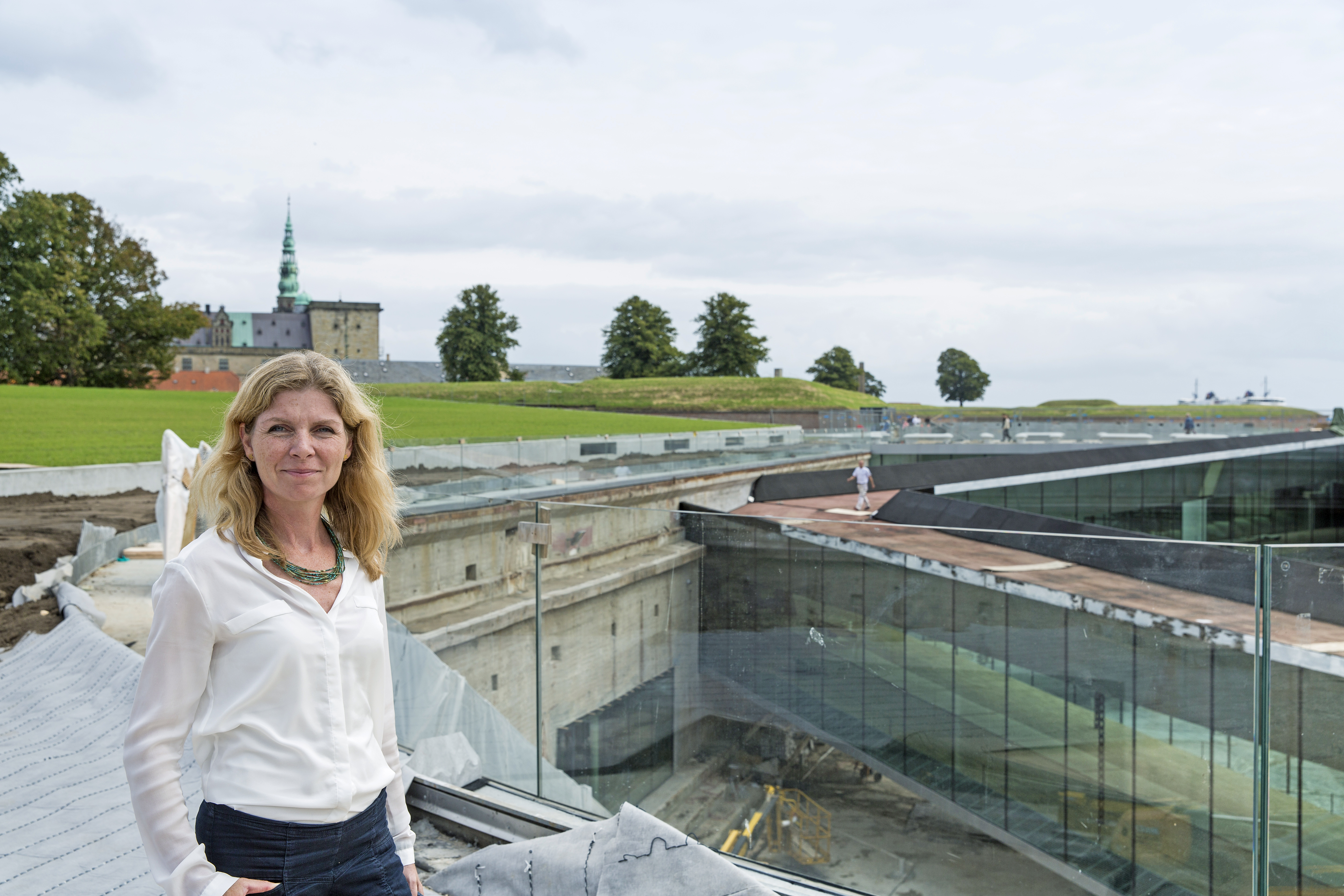
- Camilla Mordhorst in 2013
- Born: Camilla Mordhorst; 1970 (age 55–56); Denmark
- Occupation: museum professional
- Known for: President of EUNIC

Camilla Mordhorst (born 8 September 1970) is a museum professional from Denmark. She has been director of the Danish Cultural Institute since 2019 and President of EUNIC since July 2023.

Mordhorst studied at the Nørre Gymnasium in Denmark, graduated in communication and European ethnology from Roskilde University 1996 and earned a Ph.D. at the National Museum in 2003. In 2004, she was employed at the Medical Museum. From 2009 to 2013, she was museum inspector and head of the communication unit at the Museum of Copenhagen. From 1 June 2013, Camilla Mordhorst was director of the Maritime Museum in Helsingør, where she succeeded Jørgen Selmer.

On 1 May 2015, she took over as deputy director at the National Museum.

Camilla Mordhorst took up the position of director of the Danish Cultural Institute on 1 January 2019, and was named President of the board of European Union National Institutes for Culture in July 2023.
