= Folmer Wisti =

- Born: 8 May 1908; Vroue, Denmark
- Died: 16 October 2000 (aged 92)
- Occupation(s): Associate professor and philologist

Folmer Wisti (8 May 1908 – 16 October 2000) was a Danish director, associate professor and philologist. He was the first Slavic philologist from Aarhus University. Wisti was the instigator and leader of the Danish Cultural Institute (originally Danish Society) from 1940 to 1983. In 1974, he founded the Foundation for International Understanding, today known as the Folmer Wisti Foundation for International Understanding.

From 1976, he was also the organizer of conferences Europe of the regions as well as the information sheet, Regional Contact.

== Bibliography ==
- Grænseløs kulturudveksling -Det Danske Kulturinstitut i 70 år, af dr.phil. Niels Finn Christiansen (suppleret af billedfortællinger ved cand.mag. Kenn Schoop), 2009.
- Portræt: Thomas Kluge, 1998, Det Nationalhistoriske Museum Frederiksborg
