= Embassy of Denmark, Moscow =

Embassy of Denmark in Moscow Kongelig dansk ambassade i Moskva Посольство Дании в России
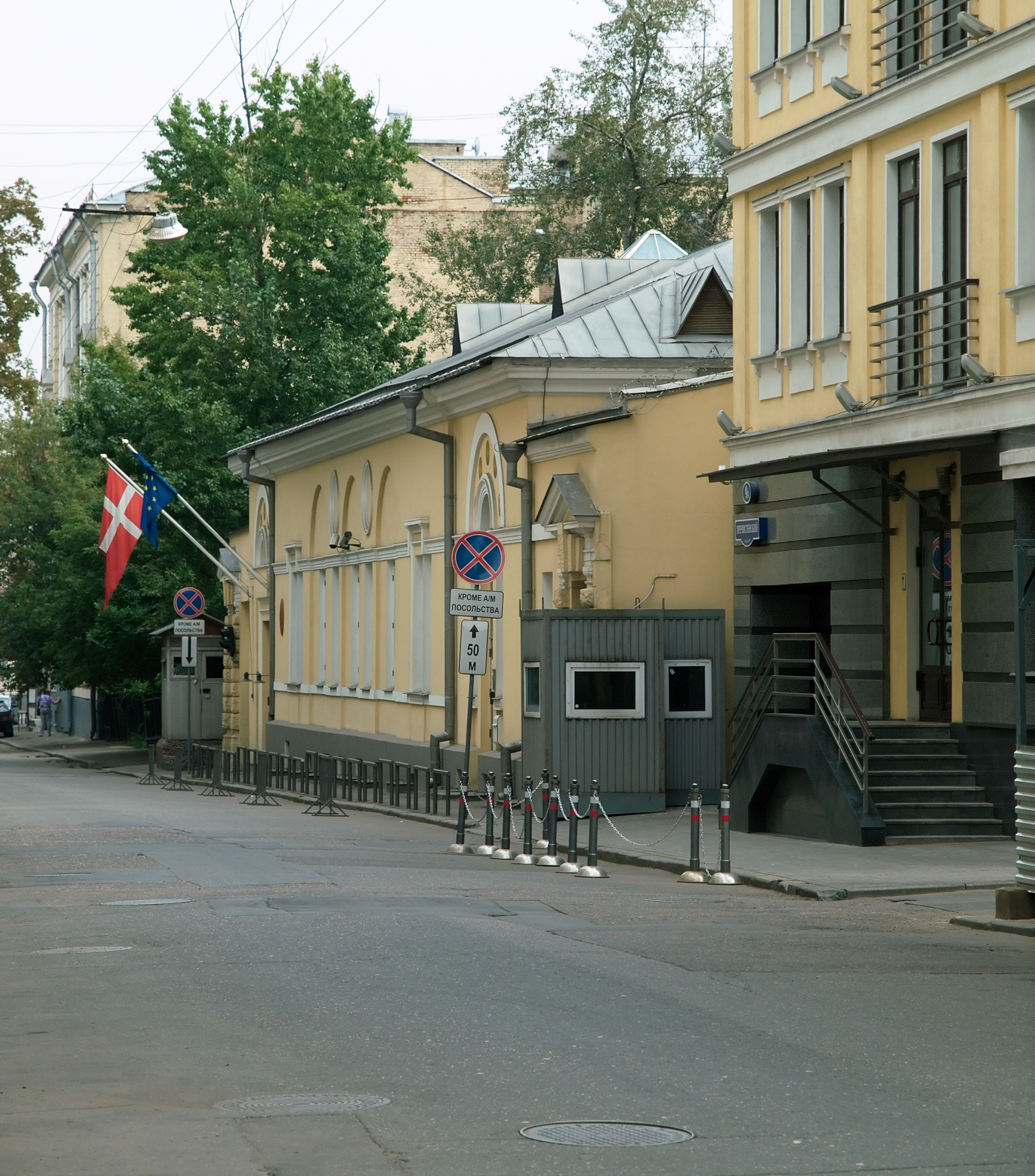
- Location: Moscow, Russia
- Address: 9 Prechistensky Lane (Пречистенский переулок, д. 9); 119034 Moscow
- Coordinates: 55°44′37″N 37°35′32″E
- Ambassador: Carsten Søndergaard
- Website: rusland.um.dk

The Embassy of Denmark in Moscow is the chief diplomatic mission of Denmark in the Russian Federation. It is located at 9 Prechistensky Lane (Russian: Пречистенский переулок, д. 9) in the Khamovniki District of Moscow.

== See also ==
- Denmark–Russia relations
- Diplomatic missions in Russia
