= Susanna Roth =

Swiss translator

- Born: 1950; Winterthur, Zürich
- Died: 11 July 1997 (aged 46–47); Zürich, Switzerland
- Citizenship: Swiss
- Occupation: Translator

Susanna Roth (1950–1997) was a Swiss bohemist and literary translator.

== Career ==
Susanna Roth studied Romance and Slavic philology in Zürich, Paris and Prague. From 1977 to 1982 she worked at the Slavic studies of the University of Zurich. In 1985, she received her doctorate from the same university based on a dissertation on the Czech writer Bohumil Hrabal. She worked as a translator and headed the Zürich East/West office of the Pro Helvetia Foundation. Roth translated more than thirty books by Czech authors into German, including Milan Kundera, Bohumil Hrabal, Věra Linhartová, Daniela Hodrová and Božena Němcová.

Roth was the recipient of two Paul Celan Fellowships for Translators of the Institut für die Wissenschaften vom Menschen in Vienna. In 1993, she was awarded the Premia Bohemica award for her contribution to popularising Czech literature abroad. Two years later, she received the Jaeggi-Übersetzer-Preis.

== Legacy ==
The Susanna Roth Award, named after her, has been awarded to young translators from Czech since 2014 by the Literary Section of the Arts and Theatre Institute and the Czech Centres. Its 2023 edition was held in 17 countries.
