= Czech Centres =

Organization of the Ministry of Foreign Affairs of the Czech Republic

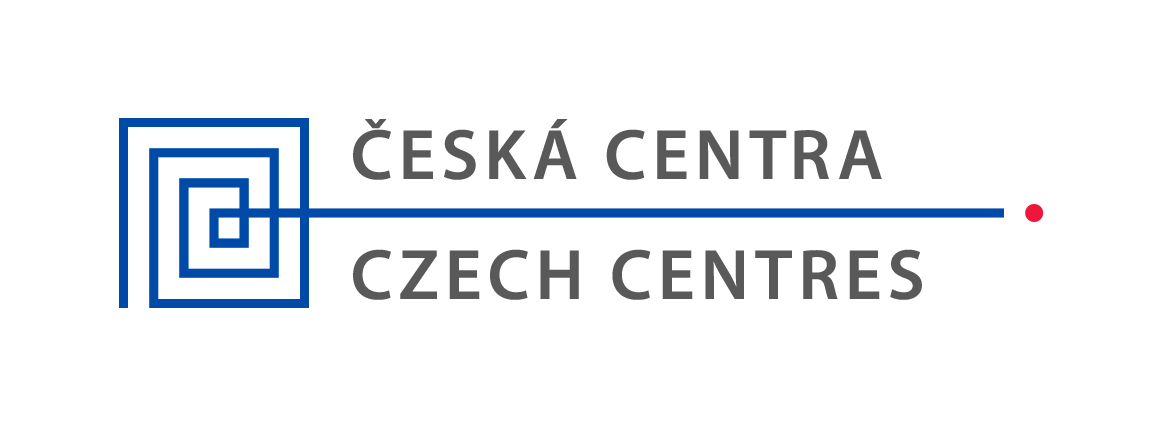
- Founded: 1949; 77 years ago
- Founder: Government of Czech Republic
- Type: Cultural institution
- Region served: Worldwide
- Product: Czech cultural education

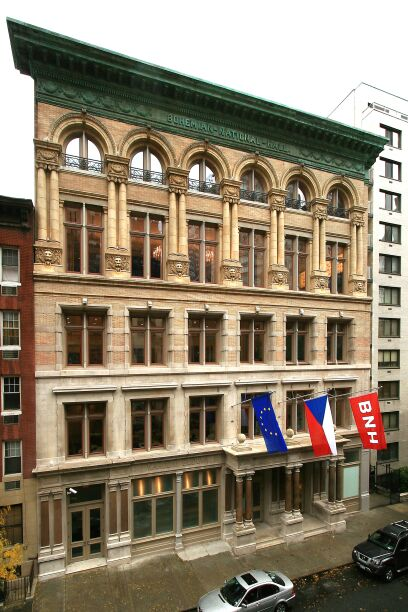
The Czech Center in New York

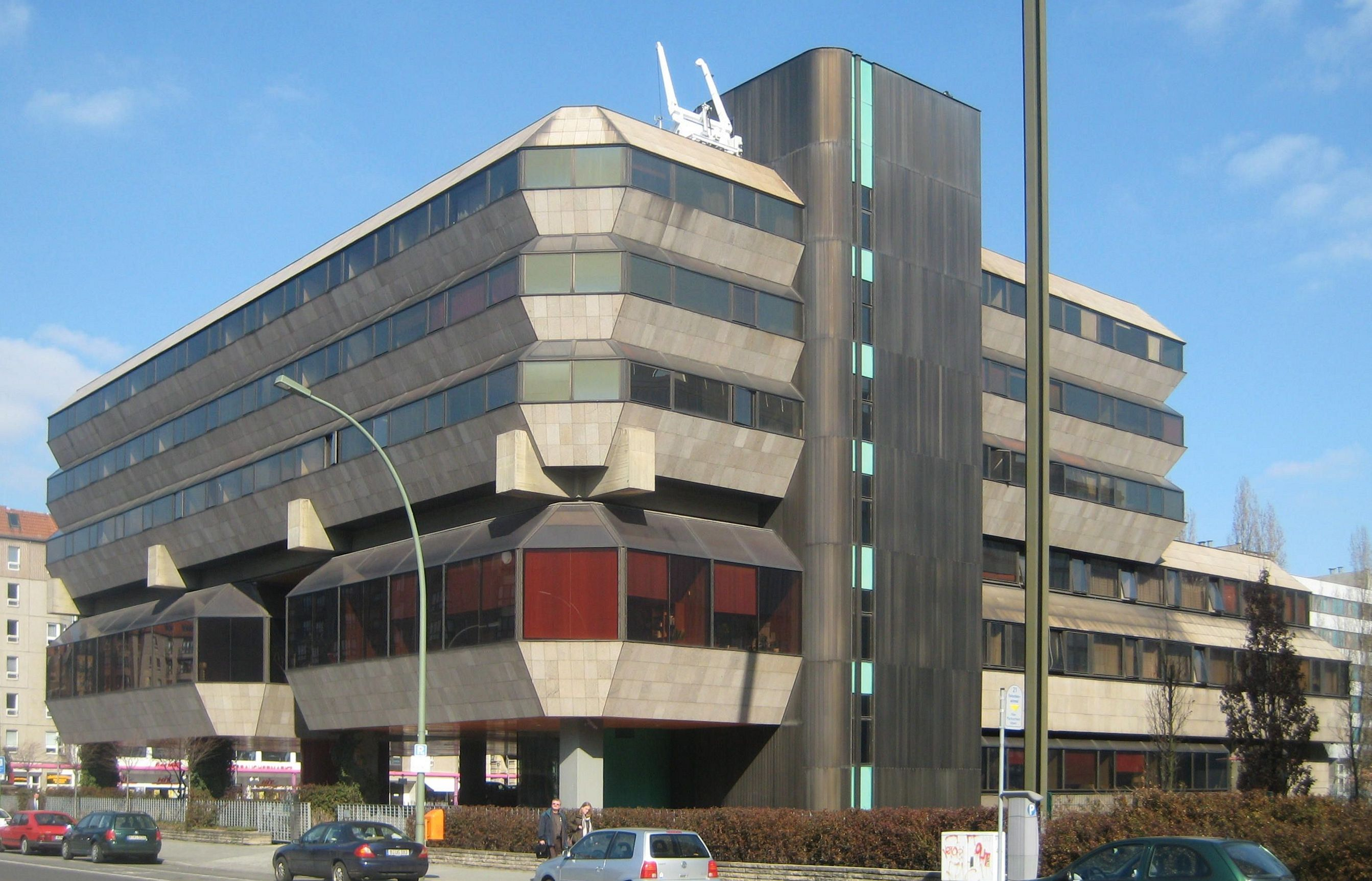
The Czech Center in Berlin in the building of Czech Embassy

Czech Centres (Czech: Česká centra) is an organization of the Ministry of Foreign Affairs of the Czech Republic consisting of offices in 26 countries throughout three continents. It was established for the promotion of the Czech history, culture, language, tourism and trade abroad. It is considered an active instrument of foreign policy of the Czech Republic through public diplomacy.

== History ==
The organisation dates back to its opening in 1949 as the Cultural and Information Centres (CIS) in Sofia and Warsaw. In the Eastern Bloc, further CIS offices were opened in Budapest (1953), Berlin (1955) and Bucharest (1981). In 1993, the organisation's name was changed from the Cultural and Information Centres to Czech Centres and the range of operations was expanded to encompass exports and tourism with new offices opened outside of Central and Eastern Europe.

In 2006, Czech Centres opened its first office in Asia in Tokyo, Japan. In the same year, Czech Centres became a member of EUNIC.The most recent office to open was in Seoul, South Korea in 2013. In April 2017, the organisation's Director General Jan Závěšický was removed by the Foreign Minister Lubomir Zaoralek due to 'serious managerial errors'.

== Activities ==
According to its 2012-2015 Strategic Report, the Czech Centres are tasked with the following activities:

- Promoting the Czech Republic abroad in cooperation with diplomatic missions.
- Facilitating participation in foreign projects for Czech entities and the development of international cooperation.
- Promoting Czech culture (such as the fine arts, architecture, design, fashion, film, music and literature).
- Providing support for external economic relations and developing Czech export opportunities.
- Cooperating with universities and institutions of education, science, research and innovation to promote the success of Czech research and development.
- Supporting teaching the Czech language abroad by running certified Czech language courses and exams.
- Promoting the Czech Republic as a tourist destination with a focus on regional presentations abroad.

In 2015, Czech Centres enrolled 2,063 students in Czech language courses.

== Events and awards ==
Within these activities, the Czech Centres organises cultural and educational events in the Czech Republic and abroad, such as:

- the Night of Literature festival (Noc Literatury),
- the Made In Prague film festival,
- the One World Film Festival,
- the Echoes of Ji.hlava documentary film festival,
- educational events and publications about Czech scientists, such as Otto Wichterle and Antonín Holý.

In addition to this, it organises several awards and curatorial internships for areas of Czech culture, such as the Susanna Roth Award for young translators.

== Locations ==
The Czech Centres has 28 branches on 4 continents:

- Austria - Vienna
- Belgium - Brussels
- Bulgaria - Sofia
- Czech Republic - Prague (headquarters)
- Egypt - Cairo
- France - Paris
- Georgia - Tbilisi
- Germany - Berlin, Munich
- Greece - Athens
- Hungary - Budapest
- Israel - Tel Aviv, Jerusalem
- Italy - Rome, Milan
- Japan - Tokyo
- Netherlands - Rotterdam
- Poland - Warsaw
- Romania - Bucharest
- Russia - Moscow
- Serbia - Belgrade
- Slovakia - Bratislava
- South Korea - Seoul
- Spain - Madrid
- Taiwan - Taipei
- Sweden - Stockholm
- Ukraine - Kyiv
- United States - New York City
- United Kingdom - London
- Vietnam - Hanoi

=== Headquarters ===
In April 2006, Czech Centres opened its new headquarters in Wenceslas Square, Prague.

=== Galleries ===
Czech Centres owns and curates its own galleries in Prague that are open to the general public at Rytířská 539/31.

=== Czech House in Moscow ===
Czech Centres opened its Czech House in Moscow in 2002. Its primary ambition is to serve as a contact for Russian and Czech businesses. Czech House in Moscow is currently the largest complex owned by the Czech Republic abroad, containing 122 offices, 132 apartments, 87 hotel rooms in addition to conference rooms, a business centre, restaurant, bar, gym fitness centre and sauna, as well as other facilities.
