= Consulate General of Denmark, Saint Petersburg =

Consulate-General of Denmark in Saint Petersburg Королевское Генеральное Консульство Дании в Санкт-Петербурге Dansk Generalkonsulat i Sankt Petersborg
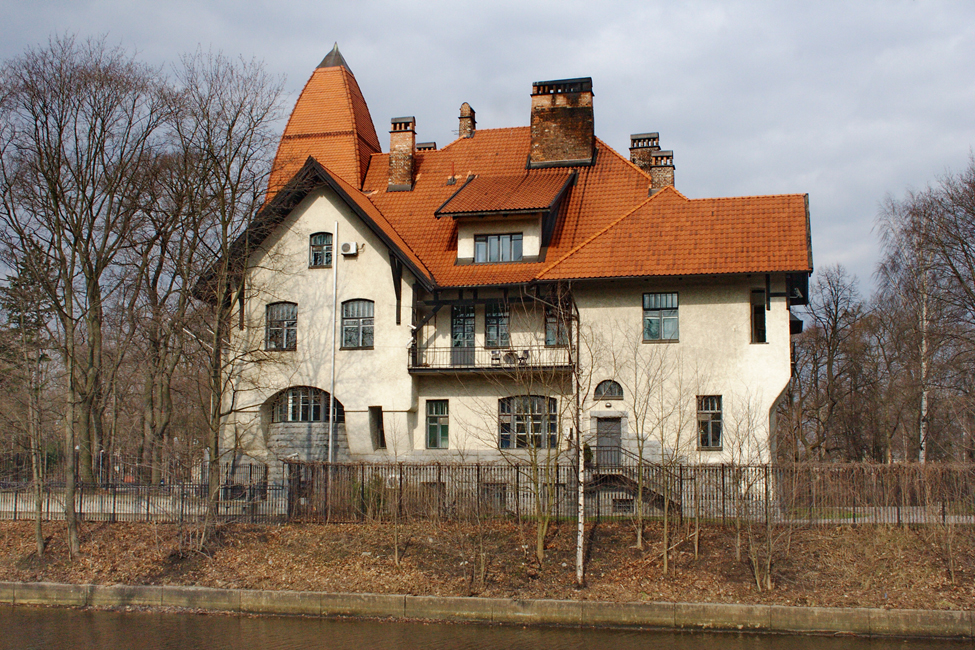
- Location: Saint Petersburg
- Address: 13 Bolshaya Alleya
- Coordinates: 59°58′44.601″N 30°17′1.4964″E

The Consulate-General of Denmark in Saint Petersburg is the diplomatic mission of Denmark in Saint Petersburg, Russian Federation. It is located at 13 Bolshaya Alleya (Russian: Большая аллея, 13) on Kamenny Island in Saint Petersburg.

On 6 October 1903, the land on which the consulate-general is situated was leased for 90 years to the Swiss tailor Edward Follenweider, who was the couturier to the Imperial Russian court and its royal guard. The house was designed in 1904 by the architect Roman Meltzer, who was one of the interior designers of the Winter and Alexander Palaces in Saint Petersburg, and was built in 1906 at a cost of 212,000 roubles.

After the October Revolution in 1917, Kamenny Island was renamed Workers' Island (Russian: остров Трудящихся) and the dachas were used by decree of Vladimir Lenin as rest homes, sanitoriums and housing for the homeless. Follenweider's Mansion, also known to locals as the Gingerbread House or Fairytale House, was handed over to the Leningrad Administration of Trade Unions and was transformed into a sanatorium for the treatment of diseases of the gastrointestinal tract.

In November 1992, the house was granted to the Royal Danish Government to house their consulate-general in Saint Petersburg.

== See also ==
- Denmark–Russia relations
- Diplomatic missions in Russia
