= Goethe-Institut =

Nonprofit German cultural organization

Goethe-Institut e.V.

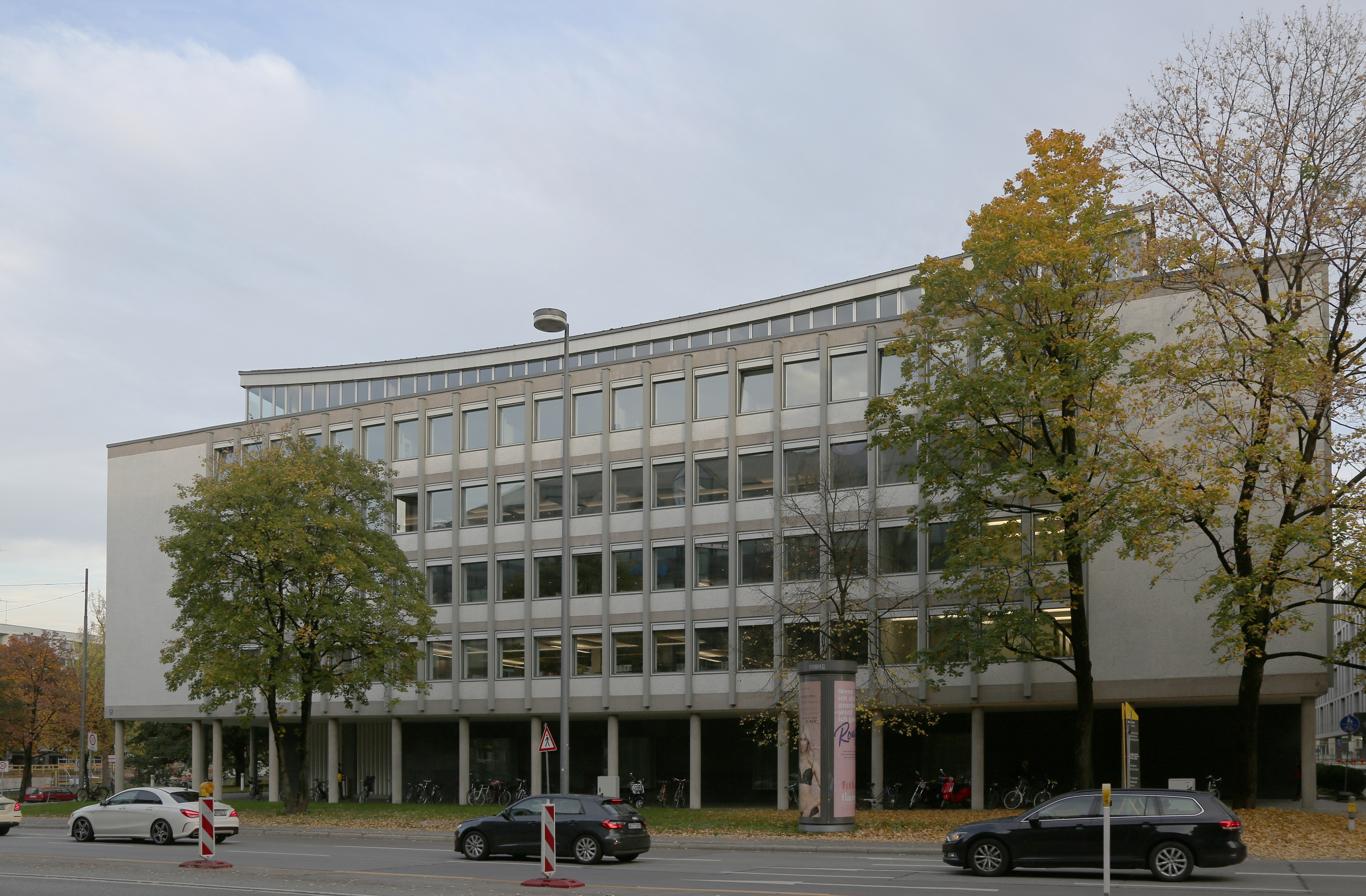
- Headquarters in Munich (2019)
- Founded: 1951; 75 years ago
- Type: Cultural institution
- Headquarters: Munich, Bavaria, Germany
- Region served: Worldwide
- Product: German cultural and language promotion
- Key people: Gesche Joost (President); Gitte Zschoch (Secretary General); Doreen Kirmse (Business Director)
- Website: goethe.de

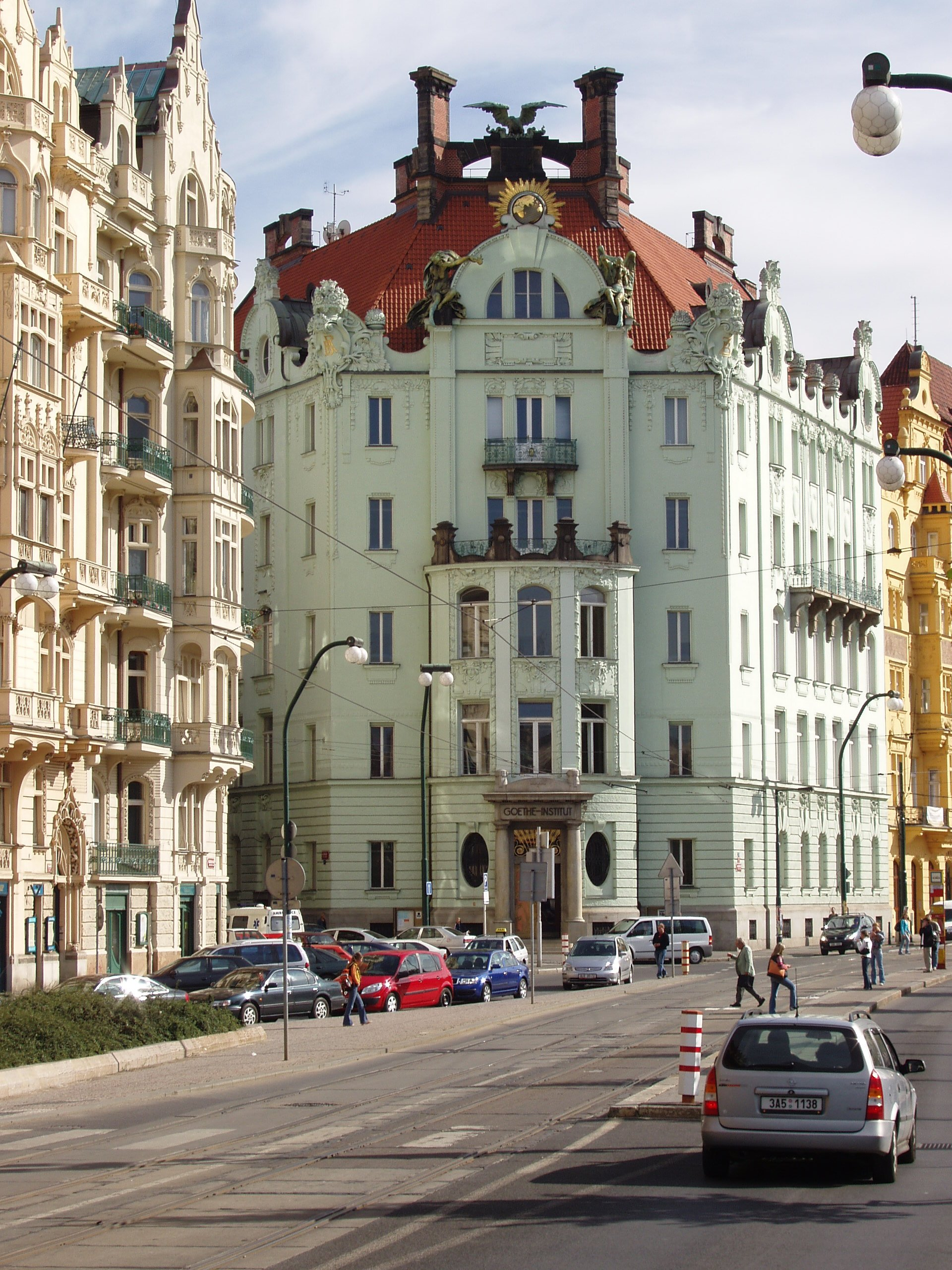
Goethe-Institut, Prague

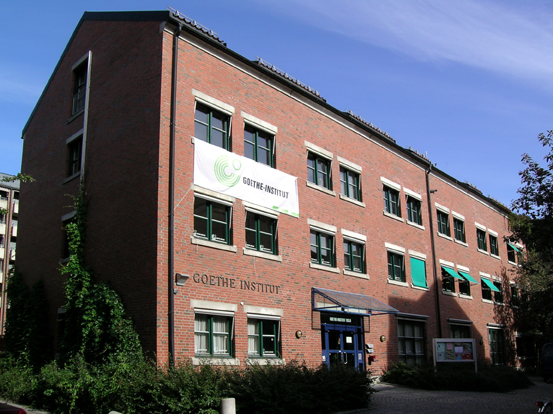
Goethe-Institut Oslo

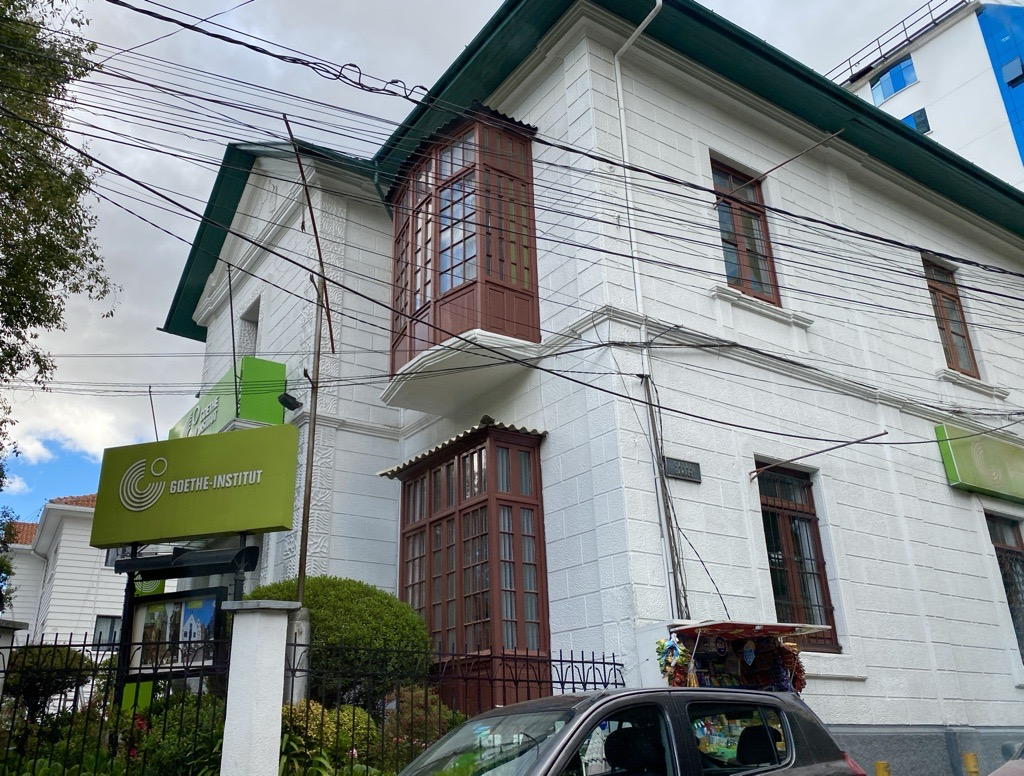
The Goethe-Institut in La Paz, Bolivia

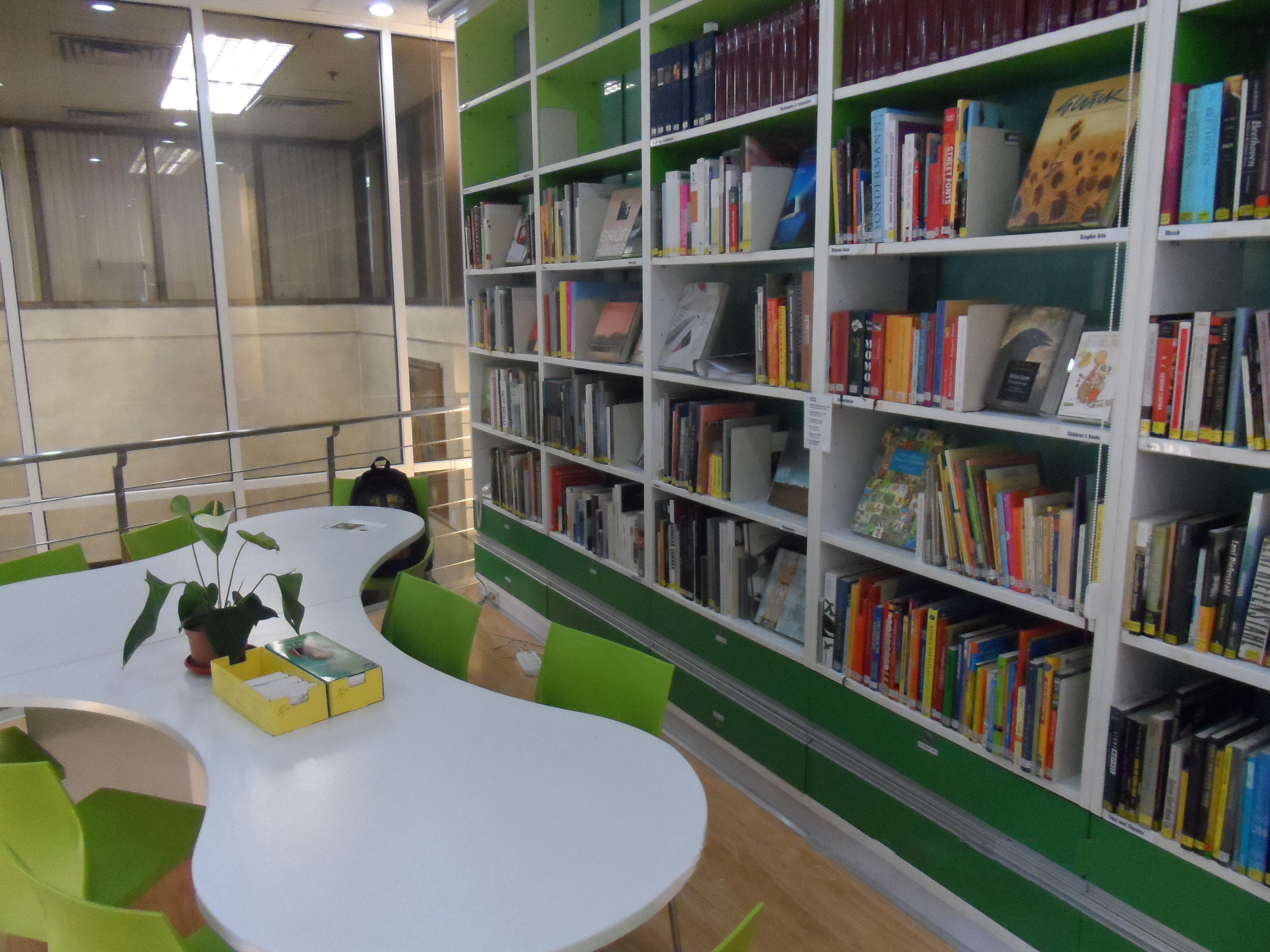
Library of the Goethe-Institut Philippines

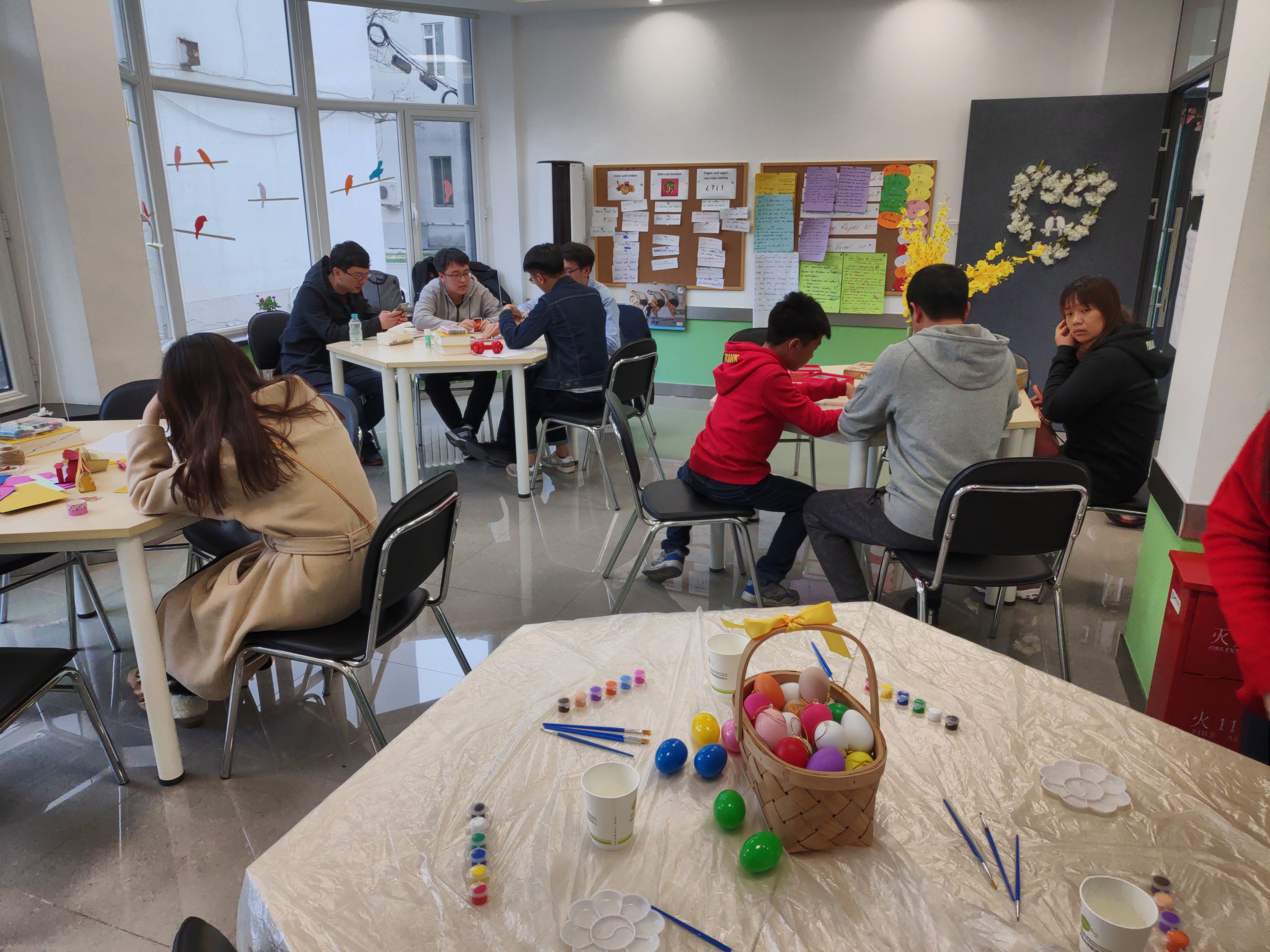
German Easter traditions at Goethe-language centre, Shenyang

The Goethe-Institut (German: [ˈɡøːtə ʔɪnstiˌtuːt]; GI, Goethe Institute) is a nonprofit German cultural organization operational worldwide with more than 150 cultural centres across 99 countries, promoting the study of the German language abroad and encouraging international cultural exchange and relations. Around 246,000 people have studied German in these courses per year. It is named after German poet and statesman Johann Wolfgang von Goethe. As a registered association, the Goethe-Institut e.V. is politically independent.

The Goethe-Institut fosters knowledge about Germany by providing information on German culture, society and socio-political affairs. This includes the promotion of German films, music, theatre, and literature. Goethe cultural societies, reading rooms, and examination and language centres have played an important role in the cultural and educational activities of Germany in many countries for more than 60 years.

Partners of the institute and its centres are public and private cultural institutions, the German federal states, local authorities and civil society. Much of the Goethe-Institut's overall budget consists of annual grants from the German Foreign Office and the German Press Office. The relationship with the Foreign Office is governed by a general agreement. Further, self-generated income and contributions from sponsors and patrons, partners and friends support the work of the Goethe-Institut.

== History ==
- 1951: The government of the German Federal republic replaced the former Deutsche Akademie with the new Goethe-Institut.
- 1952: The first Goethe-Institut opened in Athens.
- 1953: The first language courses run by the Goethe-Institut began in Bad Reichenhall. Due to growing demand, new centres of learning were opened in Murnau and Kochel, the focus of selection being on towns which were small and idyllic and which showed post-war Germany at its best. Lessons were taught based on the first textbook developed by the Goethe-Institut, known by its authors' names "Schulz-Griesbach".
- 1953–1955: The first foreign lectureships of what was the German Academy were taken over by the Goethe-Institut. Responsibilities included German tuition, teacher training and providing a programme of cultural events to accompany courses.
- 1959–1960: On the initiative of the head of the arts sector of the Foreign Office, Dieter Sattler, the Goethe-Institut gradually took over all existing German cultural institutes abroad.
- 1962: A Goethe-Institut opened in Malaysia with more than 200 students enrolled.
- 1968: Influenced by the student revolts of the late 1960s the Goethe-Institut readjusted its programme of cultural events to include socio-political topics and avant-garde art.
- 1970: Acting on behalf of the Foreign Office, German politician Ralf Dahrendorf developed his "guiding principles for foreign cultural policy". Cultural work involving dialogue and partnership was declared "the third pillar of German foreign policy". During the Willy Brandt era, the concept of "extended culture" formed the basis of activities at the Goethe-Institut.
- 1976: The Foreign Office and the Goethe-Institut signed a general agreement governing the status of the Goethe-Institut, henceforth an independent cultural organisation.
- 1980: A new plan regarding the location of institutes within Germany was drawn up. Course venues in small towns, mostly in Bavaria, were replaced by institutes in cities and university towns.
- 1989–1990: The fall of the Berlin Wall marked a turning point for the Goethe-Institut. Its activities in the 1990s were centered on Eastern Europe, where numerous new institutes were set up.
- 2001: The Goethe-Institut merged with the cultural organization Inter Nationes.
- 2004: The Goethe-Institut established the first Western information centre in Pyongyang, North Korea, operational until 2009. The Goethe-Institut Inter Nationes also reverted to its original and official name, Goethe-Institut (GI).
- 2005: The Goethe-Institut was honoured with the Prince of Asturias Prize of Spain.
- 2010: Italian cartoonist Bruno Bozzetto created the new cartoon film Va Bene for the institute.
- 2014: A Goethe-Institut opened in Myanmar's capital Yangon.

== Organization ==
The Goethe-Institut is mainly financed by the federal government of Germany, and has around 1,000 employees and an overall budget of approximately 366 million euros, more than half of which is generated from tuition and examination fees. The institute offers training courses and scholarships, including tuition waivers, to students from foreign countries, who are or want to become teachers of German as a foreign language.

== Distance education ==
The Goethe-Institut offers courses in distance education. As a result of the COVID-19 pandemic, when most governments imposed stay-at-home orders and/or COVID-19 lockdowns, Goethe-Institut introduced a series of "blended learning" courses.

== Examinations ==
The institute has developed a series of exams for learners of German as a foreign language (Deutsch als Fremdsprache, DaF) at all levels: A1 up to C2. These can be taken both in Germany and abroad and have been adapted to fit into the Common European Framework of Reference for Languages (CEFR), the standard for European language testing. There is also one exam, the Großes Deutsches Sprachdiplom, which is at a still higher level than the highest CEFR level.

In 2000, the Goethe-Institut helped to found the Society for Academic Test Development (Gesellschaft für Akademische Testentwicklung e.V.). The resulting TestDaF exams are run by the TestDaF-Institut in Hagen. The tests are supported by the German Academic Exchange Service (DAAD) and are aimed at people who would like to study at German universities, academics and scientists. The TestDaF can be taken in Germany as well as in 65 other countries. For language teachers, there is the "Green Diploma" to acquire and prove qualifications in teaching German as a foreign language.

== Awards and residency programs ==
The two US-related annually granted awards for literature translations from German into English are the renowned Helen and Kurt Wolff Translator's Prize, and the Gutekunst Prize of the Friends of Goethe New York. The latter is open to college students and to all translators under the age of 35 who, at the time the prize is awarded, have not yet published.

=== Goethe Medal ===
Once a year, the Goethe-Institut awards the Goethe Medal, an official decoration of the Federal Republic of Germany. It honours foreign personalities who have performed outstanding service for the German language and international cultural relations. The Goethe Medal was established by the executive committee of the Goethe-Institut in 1954 and acknowledged as an official decoration by the Federal Republic of Germany in 1975.

=== Goethe-Institut Award for New Translation ===
The Society of Authors and the Goethe-Institut, London, administer the biennial Goethe-Institut Award for New Translation.

=== Villa Kamogawa artist residency programme ===
Goethe-Institut Villa Kamogawa (Japanese: ゲーテ・インスティトゥート・ヴィラ鴨川), is a German institution hosting artist residencies in Kyoto, Japan. Established in 2011 with an opening ceremony conducted by Christian Wulff, then President of Germany, it is located on the banks of the Kamo River in close vicinity to Kyoto Imperial Palace. Villa Kamogawa is one of three major German arts residency programmes abroad, together with Rome's Villa Massimo and Villa Aurora in Los Angeles. It hosts three groups of four artists every year. Former fellows include Doris Dörrie, Jörg Koopmann and Stefan Goldmann.

== Notable students ==
- Avi Primor (born 1935), Israeli publicist and former diplomat
- Jorge Mario Bergoglio (1936–2025), Pope Francis
- Ian Kershaw (born 1943), English historian
- Sanmao (1943–1991), Taiwanese author
- Primo Levi (1919–1987), Italian writer, Holocaust survivor
- Renée Fleming (born 1959), American opera singer
- Auma Obama (born 1960), journalist

== Recognition ==
In 2005, along with the Alliance française, the Società Dante Alighieri, the British Council, the Instituto Cervantes, and the Instituto Camões, the Goethe-Institut was awarded the Prince of Asturias Award for achievements in communications and the humanities. In 2007, it received a special Konrad Duden Prize for its work in the field of German language.

== See also ==
- List of countries and territories where German is an official language
- German language in the United States
- German American Partnership Program
- Hallo aus Berlin
- Cultural diplomacy
- Public diplomacy
- European Union National Institutes for Culture
- Johannes Ebert
