= Danish Cultural Institute =

Coordinates: 55.6756°N 12.5718°E

- Founded: 1940; 86 years ago
- Founder: Government of Denmark
- Type: Cultural institution
- Region served: Worldwide
- Product: Danish cultural education
- Key people: Folmer Wisti
- Website: https://www.danishculture.com/

The Danish Cultural Institute promotes cultural exchanges between Denmark and the rest of the world. It supports projects aimed at long-term cooperation between foreign and Danish cultural institutions, artists and other professionals. The current CEO is Camilla Mordhorst.

DCI is a founding member of European Union National Institutes for Culture and has held its presidency thrice.

== History ==
The Danish Cultural Institute began in 1940, when Folmer Wisti established the Danish Society. The aim of the Society was to promote international understanding through information about Denmark and to further the exchange of culture, ideas and experience between Denmark and other countries. Its name was changed to the Danish Cultural Institute in 1989.

Since its foundation, the Danish Cultural Institute has put a lot of effort into its local representation in foreign countries. The first foreign branch offices were established in 1947. These offices are often situated outside the capital city.

== Offices ==
The Danish Cultural Institute's head office is in Copenhagen, Denmark. The number and location of offices has varied over the years. Earlier there were institutes in France, Germany, the United Kingdom, the United States, the Netherlands, northern Italy, Hungary, Estonia, Lithuania and Austria. Today, branch offices can be found in:

- Brazil, São Paulo
- China, Beijing
- Georgia, Tbilisi
- Latvia, Riga
- Moldova, Chișinău
- Ukraine, Kyiv
- India
- Turkey
