= Denmark–Russia relations =

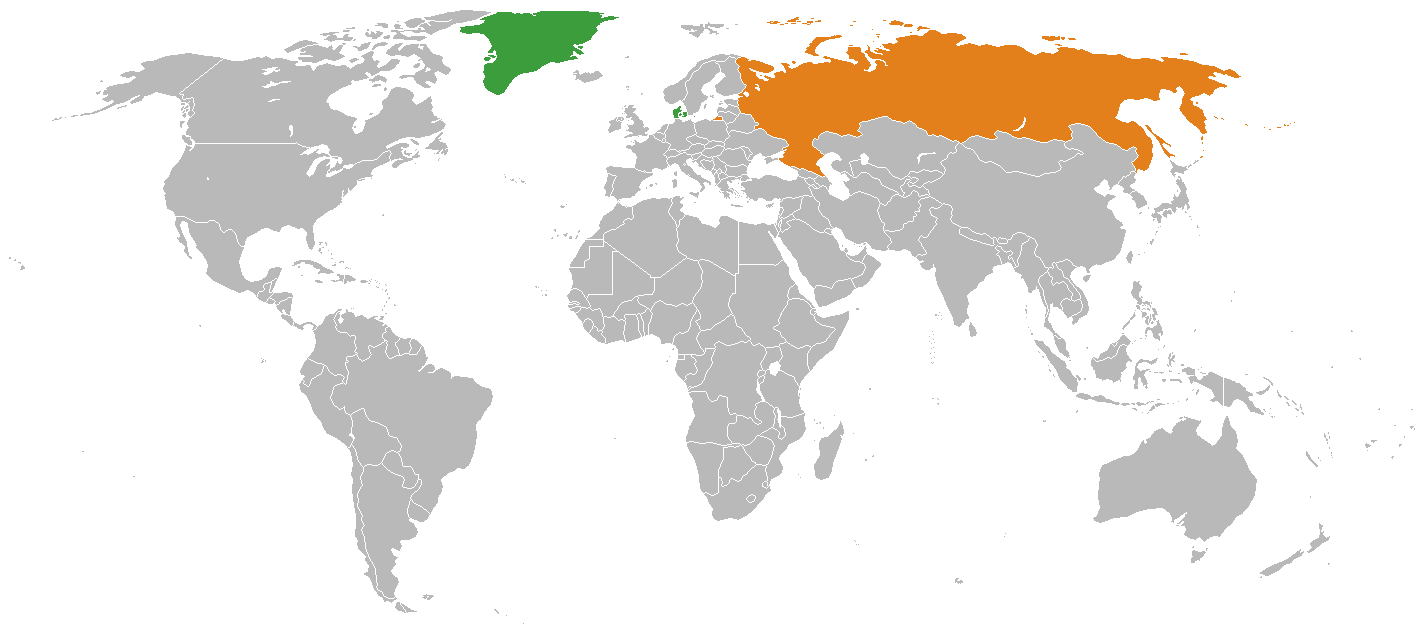
- Denmark: Russia

Diplomatic mission
- Danish embassy, Moscow: Embassy of Russia, Copenhagen

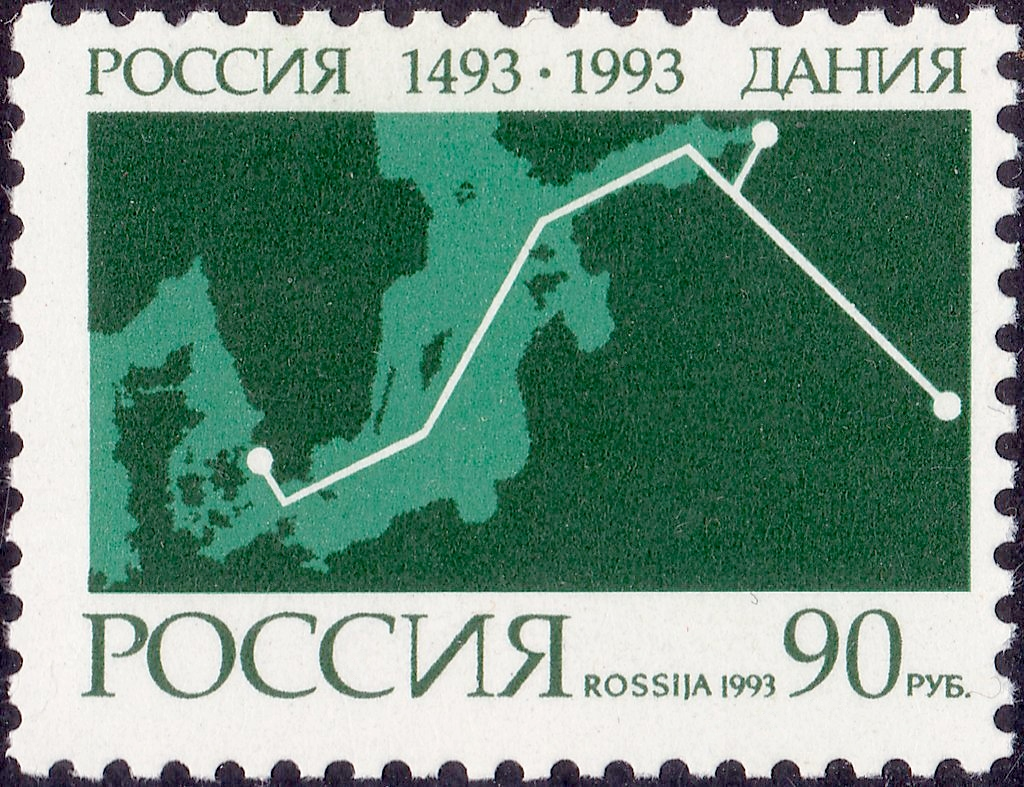
A 1993 Russian stamp dedicated to the 500th anniversary of Denmark–Russia relations

Denmark–Russia relations (alternatively: Dano-Russian relations) are the relations between the countries of Denmark and Russia. The Kings of Denmark and the Russian Tsars interacted from the 15th century onwards – subsequently Denmark's control of access to and from the Baltic Sea had considerable significance for the trade and naval flexibility of the Russian Empire, while rivalries between Denmark and Sweden on the one hand and between Sweden and Russia on the other led to alliances and military support. Denmark and the USSR established diplomatic relations on 18 June 1924.

Russia has an embassy in Copenhagen and a consulate in Tórshavn (in the Faroe Islands); Denmark has an embassy in Moscow, a Consulate-General in Saint Petersburg, and an honorary consulate in Kaliningrad. Both countries border the Baltic Sea and are members of the Organization for Security and Co-operation in Europe. Until 15 March 2022, both countries were part of the Council of Europe.

== History ==
=== Early Modern era ===
Amicable relations between the Kingdom of Denmark and the Muscovite state were based on a mutual assistance pact of 1493, renewed in 1506 and 1517. In 1562, the Danish king Frederick II and the Russian tsar Ivan IV continued amicable relations based on the Treaty of Mozhaysk. (The two realms were neighbours: Denmark had interests in the Duchy of Estonia from 1219 to 1346 and from 1559 to 1645.)

=== 18th century ===
==== Great Northern War ====
During the Great Northern War, a coalition of various states successfully attacked the Swedish Empire in northern Central and Eastern Europe. Initially, the anti-Swedish alliance was composed of the Tsardom of Russia, Denmark-Norway, and Saxe-Poland-Lithuania. Frederik IV and August the Strong were forced out of the alliance in 1700 and 1706, respectively, but re-joined it in 1709. George I of Brunswick-Lüneburg (Hanover) joined the coalition in 1714 for Hanover, and 1717 for Britain, and Frederick William I of Brandenburg-Prussia in 1715. On the Swedish side were Holstein-Gottorp (a Danish vassal), between 1704 and 1710 several Polish and Lithuanian magnates under Stanisław Leszczyński, and between 1708 and 1710 cossacks under Ivan Mazepa. The Ottoman Empire temporarily hosted Charles XII of Sweden and intervened against Peter the Great.

After fighting in various other theatres went against the Swedes, Sweden proper was invaded by Denmark-Norway from the west and by Russia from the east. Though the Danish attacks were repulsed, Russia managed to occupy Finland and inflict severe losses on the Swedish navy and coastal fortresses. Charles XII opened up a Norwegian front, but was killed in Fredriksten in 1718. The war ended with a defeat for Sweden, leaving Russia as the new major power in the Baltic Sea and a new important player in European politics – in fact, it signed the beginning of a pattern of Russian expansion that would only be stopped two centuries later. Denmark gained little from Sweden in the 1721 peace settlement (Treaty of Nystad), but it was able to gain at the expense of its disloyal vassal in Holstein.

==== Holstein-Gottorp ====
Sweden's defeat in the Great Northern War ended its patronage for Holstein-Gottorp, and Denmark used the occasion to seize Gottorp's territory in Schleswig. The frustrated Duke of Holstein-Gottorp sought support for the recovery of Schleswig in Russia and married into the Russian imperial family in 1725. Russian Empress Elizabeth died childless in 1762, and she appointed her nephew, the Duke of Holstein-Gottorp, to be her successor in Russia. When he ascended the throne as Tsar Peter III of Russia, Holstein-Gottorp came to be ruled in personal union by the Emperor of Russia, creating a conflict of territorial claims between Russia and Denmark.

Peter III threatened war with Denmark for the recovery of his ancestral lands, but before any fighting could begin he was overthrown by his wife, who took control of Russia as Tsarina Catherine II. Empress Catherine reversed Russia's stance, withdrawing her husband's ultimatum and even entering an alliance with Denmark in 1765. In the 1760s the two governments negotiated the transfer of ducal Schleswig-Holstein to the Danish crown in return for Russian control of the County of Oldenburg and adjacent lands within the Holy Roman Empire, an exchange that was formalized with the 1773 Treaty of Tsarskoye Selo. The alliance that accompanied the territorial exchange tied Denmark's foreign policy to Russia's and led directly to Denmark's involvement in a series of wars over the succeeding decades.

==== Russo-Swedish War (1788–1790) ====
When Sweden attacked Russia in 1788, Denmark upheld its treaty obligations to Russia and declared war on Sweden. A Norwegian army briefly invaded Sweden and won the Battle of Kvistrum Bridge, before peace was signed on 9 July 1789 following the diplomatic intervention of Great Britain and Prussia. Under their pressure, Denmark-Norway declared itself neutral in the Russo-Swedish conflict, bringing this war to an end.

=== 19th century ===
==== French Revolutionary and Napoleonic Wars ====
During the French Revolutionary Wars, Denmark and Russia were allies in the Second League of Armed Neutrality in resisting the Royal Navy's wartime policy of searching neutral shipping for French contraband, which led to the British attack on the Dano-Norwegian fleet at the 1801 Battle of Copenhagen. During the subsequent Napoleonic Wars, Russia and Denmark were members of Napoleon's Continental System, which led the British to launch another naval attack on Copenhagen in 1807. This battle initiated the Anglo-Russian War and drew Denmark into the Napoleonic conflicts in the Dano-Swedish War of 1808–09, in which both Russia and Denmark fought on France's side.

However, Napoleon's disastrous 1812 invasion of Russia pushed Russia to the opposing, British-led side in the War of the Sixth Coalition, while Denmark remained a French client. When France was eventually defeated by the Sixth Coalition, Denmark was forced to cede control of Norway to Sweden in the 1814 Treaty of Kiel, accelerating Denmark's decline as a major power in Europe.

==== Schleswig Wars ====
As German nationalism rose in the mid-1800s, the Schleswig-Holstein Question came to dominate Denmark's foreign affairs. After the First Schleswig War Russia took Denmark's side in the negotiation of the 1852 London Protocol, which reaffirmed Danish sovereignty in the disputed duchies. Russia also offered diplomatic support for Denmark in the Second Schleswig War but did not make a military intervention, and Denmark ultimately lost Schleswig-Holstein in its entirety to Prussia in the 1864 Treaty of Vienna.

==== Empress Maria Feodorovna ====
In 1866 Danish Princess Dagmar, a daughter of King Christian IX of Denmark, married the future Tsar Alexander III of Russia, taking the Russian name Maria Feodorovna. She was a popular empress and became the mother of Russia's last Tsar, Nicholas II. As Russian Empress, she donated funds for the construction of a Russian Orthodox Church in Copenhagen as a gift to the Orthodox community in Denmark. In September 2006 her remains were transferred from Denmark to St. Petersburg to be interred beside her husband.

=== 20th century ===
==== Soviet Union ====
After the 1917 Russian Revolution, Denmark recognized the Soviet Union and established diplomatic relations in 1924. Though the Danish government sought to remain neutral in both World Wars, the country was occupied by Nazi Germany in 1940 and joined the Anti-Comintern Pact in 1941 (though it insisted upon its neutrality in any conflict with Russia). Denmark also never recognized the Soviet Union's annexation of the Baltic Republics as legitimate. After World War II ended Denmark became a founding member of the North Atlantic Treaty Organization (NATO) in 1949, though its foreign policy continued to incline more toward neutrality than confrontation with the Soviet Union.

== Present ==
After the breakup of the Soviet Union in 1991, Denmark and Russia were trading partners, but the relationship became increasingly strained in the 2010s and in 2022 Denmark was one of the nations that imposed sanctions on Russia, whereas Russia designated Denmark as an "unfriendly nation".

On 27 May 2008, Russia and Denmark signed visa agreements. While Denmark did not negotiate a free trade agreement with Russia, the self-governing Faroe Islands did enter into a free trade agreement with Russia after negotiations in the early 2000s (decade). A Faroese-Soviet fisheries agreement dealing with their bordering oceans and fish stocks was already reached in 1977. A similar agreement was later reached with Russia.

In June 2014, Russian military planes practiced a missile attack on the Danish island of Bornholm according to the Danish intelligence service. In August 2014, the Danish Government announced that it would contribute to NATO's missile defense shield by equipping one or more of its frigates with the specific radar capacity. This was shortly after the Russo-Ukrainian War began and amid growing tensions between Russia and NATO. On 22 March 2015, the Russian ambassador to Denmark, Mikhail Vanin, confirmed the tensions during an interview to Jyllands-Posten: "I do not think Danes fully understand the consequences of what happens if Denmark joins the US-led missile defense. If this happens, Danish warships become targets for Russian nuclear missiles". Denmark's foreign minister, Martin Lidegaard, announced the ambassador's remarks as unacceptable and that the defense system was not aimed at Russia, a claim echoed by NATO's spokeswoman, Oana Lungescu. NATO's spokesman added that the Russian statements "do not inspire confidence or contribute to predictability, peace or stability". The Danish air force has increasingly had to deploy to deter Russian military planes from entering Danish air space, with tens of incidents each year and peaks of activity in 2014 and from 2022.

After the 2022 Russian invasion of Ukraine started, Denmark along with the other EU countries imposed sanctions on Russia, and Russia added all EU countries to the list of "unfriendly nations". The self-governing Faroe Islands, which are not part of the EU, implemented similar sanctions on Russia. In April 2022, Denmark expelled 15 Russian diplomats from Denmark, and the following month Russia expelled 4 Danish diplomats and 3 other Danish embassy workers from Russia. Relative to its GDP, Denmark was one of the nations that donated most to Ukraine (combined military and humanitarian aid) following the Russian invasion in 2022.

In January 2024 Russia terminated the tax treaty between the two nations. On November 2026, Denmark accused Russia of plotting to assassinate one rapper Kyivstoner, Denmark's security and intelligence agency (PET) arrested individuals panning to kill him. Following this, Denmark's foreign minister announced that the Russian defence attaché will be expelled.

=== Proposed United States acquisition of Greenland ===
In March 2025, Russian President Vladimir Putin commented on U.S. President Donald Trump's interest in acquiring Greenland, describing it as part of a longstanding U.S. strategy dating back to the 19th century and post-World War II offers to purchase the territory. Putin emphasized that the U.S. would continue to pursue its strategic, military, and economic interests in the Arctic, where Greenland holds significant geopolitical value. He expressed concern over NATO's growing presence in the Arctic, particularly following Finland and Sweden's accession to the alliance, and vowed to bolster Russia's military presence in the region. Despite this, Putin remained open to international cooperation, suggesting that Russia might engage in joint Arctic projects with friendly nations, including potential collaborations with Western countries.

== Resident diplomatic missions ==
- Denmark has an embassy in Moscow and a consulate-general in Saint Petersburg.
- Russia has an embassy in Copenhagen.
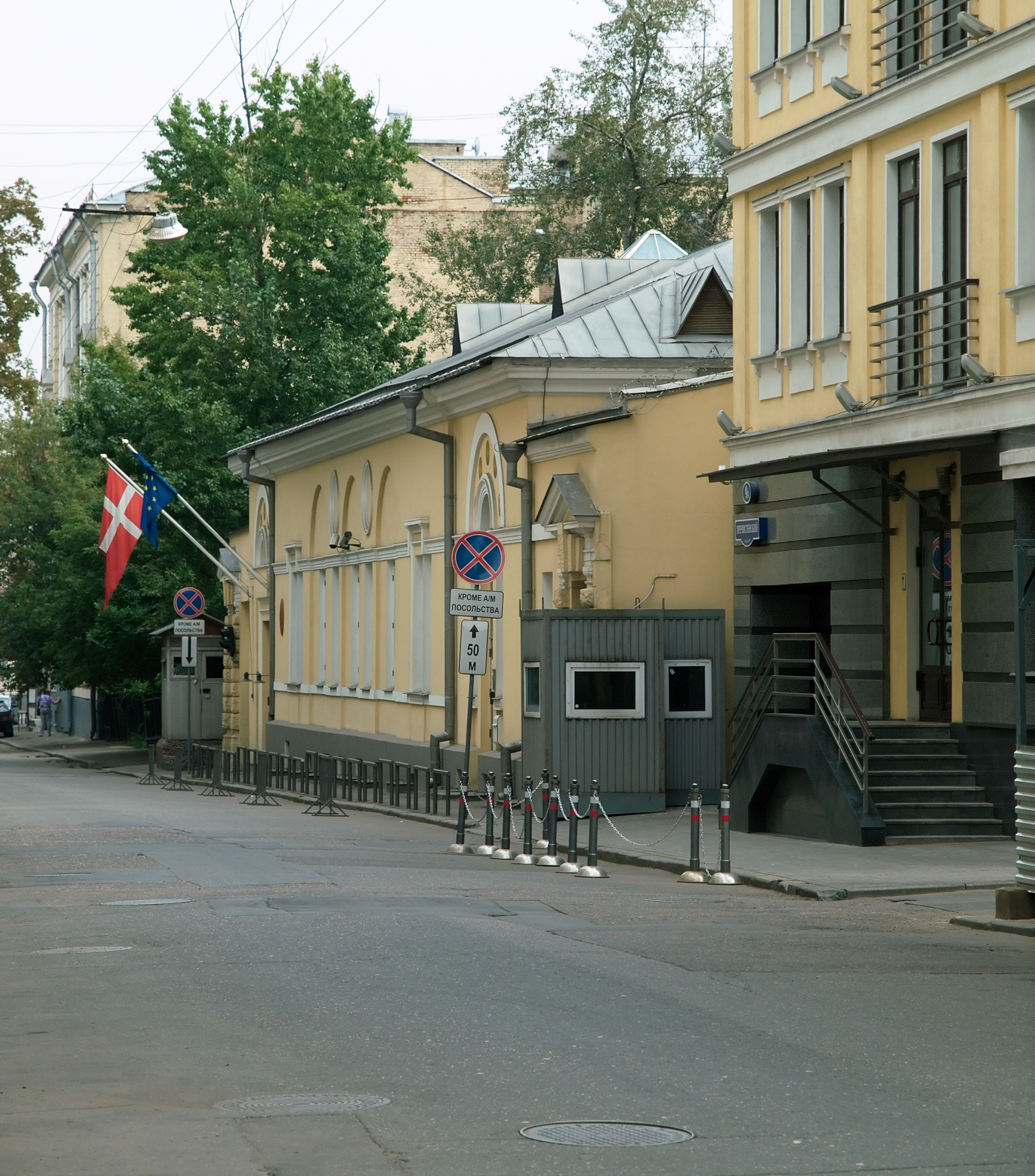
Embassy of Denmark in Moscow

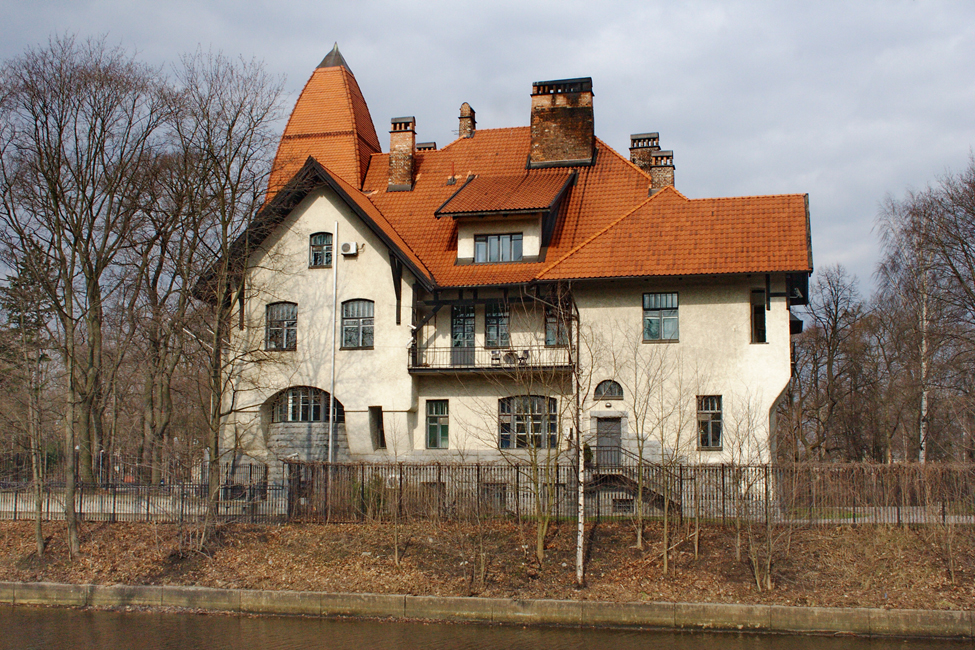
Consulate-General of Denmark in Saint Petersburg

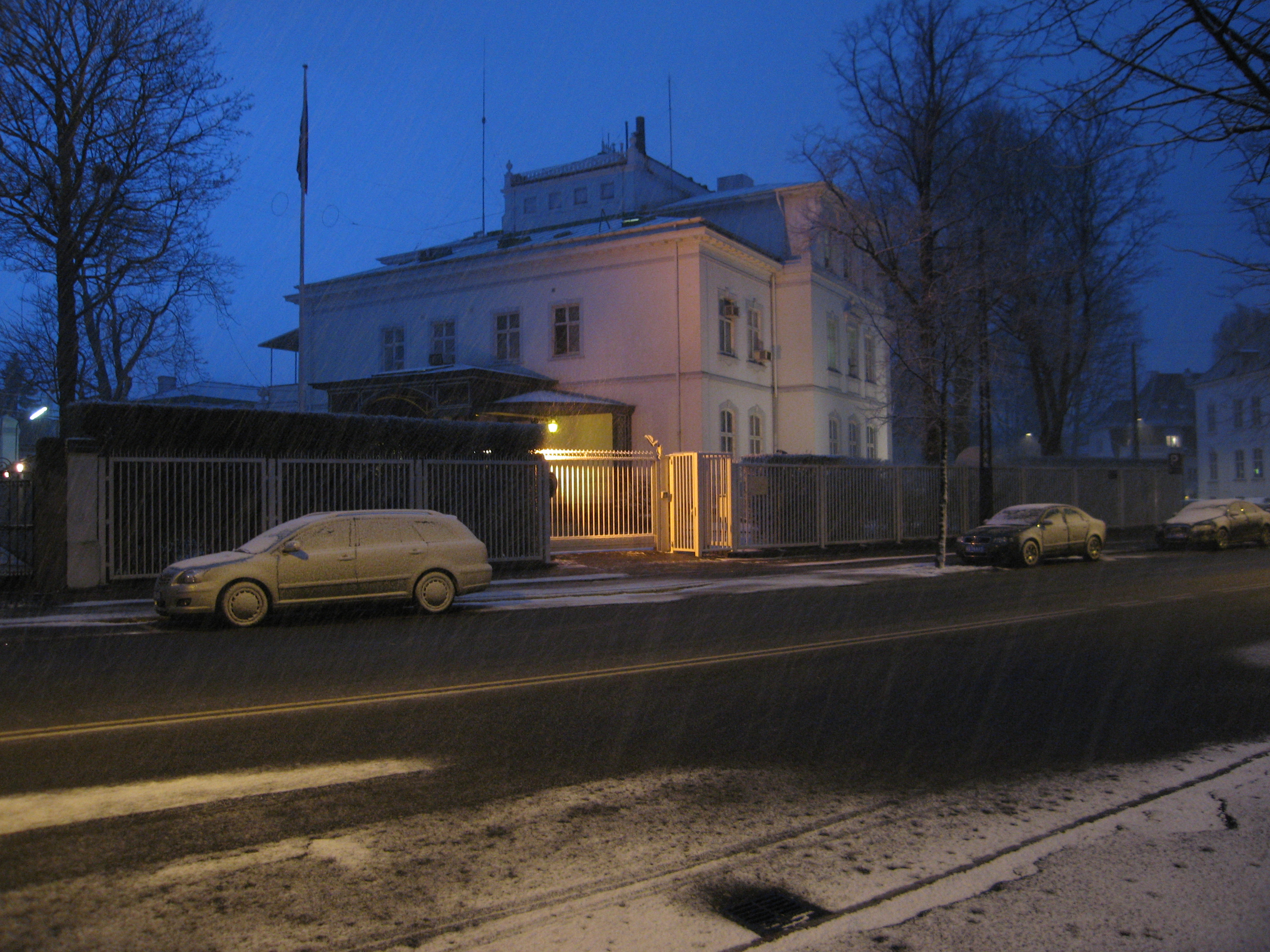
Embassy of Russia in Copenhagen

== See also ==
- Foreign relations of Denmark
- Foreign relations of Russia
- Embassy of Russia in Copenhagen
- Embassy of Denmark in Moscow
- Consulate-General of Denmark in Saint Petersburg
- Russian ambassadors to Denmark
- Russians in Denmark
- Danes in Russia
- Russia–European Union relations
