= European Union National Institutes for Culture =

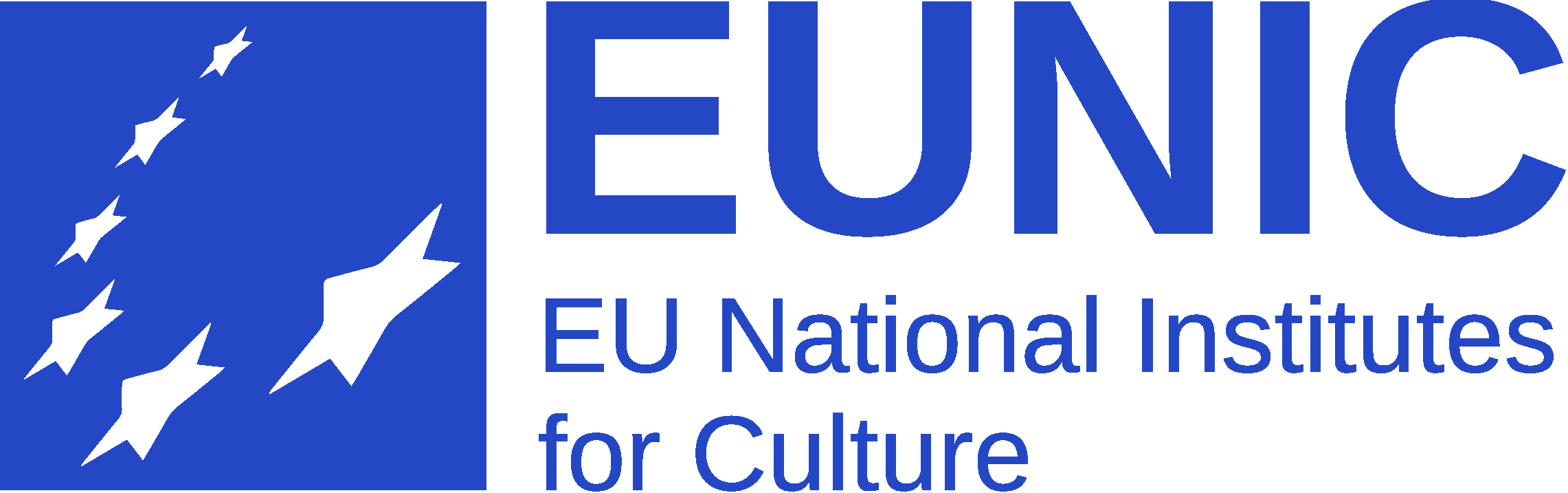
- EUNIC logo
- Abbreviation: EUNIC
- Founded: 2006
- Headquarters: Brussels, Belgium
- Location: International
- Official language: English
- Website: eunic.eu

The European Union National Institutes for Culture (EUNIC) is a network of European national institutes of culture and national bodies engaged in cultural and related activities beyond their national borders. EUNIC brings together organizations from all 27 EU member states and associated countries. The network adds value through its global network of clusters. By pooling together the resources and expertise of its members and carrying out joint work on common areas of interest, EUNIC is a recognized partner of the European Union and its stakeholders in defining and implementing European policy on culture inside and outside the EU.

== Organization ==
The overarching purpose of EUNIC is to create effective partnerships and networks between the participating organizations, to improve and promote cultural diversity and understanding between European societies, and to strengthen international dialogue and co-operation with countries outside Europe.

Since its establishment in 2006, EUNIC has evolved into a strong network delivering transnational collaborative projects worldwide through its 39 members and 143 clusters. Members consist of national cultural institutions or organizations. Clusters are collaboration platforms established where at least 3 local offices of EUNIC members operate together. Clusters can operate nationwide or citywide. A EUNIC cluster represents the whole of EUNIC and not only those members present in a country or location.

On 16 May 2017, during the Danish Presidency of EUNIC and the European Union signed an administrative agreement that outlines joint principles, values and objectives for cooperation, as well as practical arrangements for its implementation.

The Presidents are supported by the EUNIC Global office team based in Brussels. The EUNIC Global Office in Brussels also supports the work of EUNIC members and clusters around the world.

== Management ==
EUNIC is managed by a bi-annual meeting of the heads of its member organizations, a general assembly. They elect from among themselves a president, vice president, and four ordinary members who together represent the EUNIC board of directors.

=== Presidencies ===
- 2026: Germany - Institute for Foreign Cultural Relations
- 2025: Netherlands - DutchCulture, centre for international cooperation
- 2024-2025: Romania - Romanian Cultural Institute
- 2022-2023: Germany - Goethe-Institut
- 2021-2022: Spain - Spanish Agency for International Development Cooperation
- 2020-2021: Netherlands - DutchCulture, centre for international cooperation
- 2019-2020: Italy - Ministry of Foreign Affairs and International Cooperation (Italy)
- 2018-2019: France - French Ministry for Europe and Foreign Affairs
- 2017-2018: Belgium - Flanders Department of Foreign Affairs
- 2016-2017: Denmark - Danish Cultural Institute
- 2015-2016: Spain - Instituto Cervantes
- 2014-2015: Sweden - Swedish Institute
- 2013-2014: Belgium - Wallonie-Bruxelles International

=== Board Members ===
==== 2016-2017 ====
Members of the board of directors of the Danish presidency: President Michael Metz Morch- Danish Cultural Institute; Vice-President Koen Verlaeckt - Flanders Department of Foreign Affairs; Johannes Ebert - Goethe-Institut; Anne Grillo - French Ministry of Foreign Affairs and International Development; Teresa Indjein - Austrian Federal Ministry for Europe, Integration and Foreign Affairs; Małgorzata Wierzejska - Ministry of Foreign Affairs, Poland

=== Directors ===
Andrew Manning became Director of EUNIC in August 2021. He is the first Director not seconded by a EUNIC member.

==== Former EUNIC Directors ====
- Gitte Zschoch, Goethe-Institut, 2018-2021
- Andrew Murray, British Council, 2015-2018
- Helena Kovarikova, Czech Centres, 2012-2015

== Participating members ==
=== Members of EUNIC ===
as of July, 2026:

- Austria - Federal Ministry for Europe, Integration and Foreign Affairs, Österreich Institut GmbH
- Belgium - Wallonie-Bruxelles International, Flemish Department of Foreign Affairs
- Bulgaria - Bulgarian Ministry of Culture, Bulgarian State Institute for Culture
- Croatia - Croatia House Foundation
- Cyprus - Cyprus Ministry of Education & Culture
- Czech Republic - Czech Centres
- Denmark - Danish Cultural Institute
- Estonia - Estonian Institute
- Finland - Finnish cultural and academic institutes
- France - Fondation Alliance française, Institut Français, French Ministry of Foreign Affairs
- Germany - Goethe-Institut, Institute for Foreign Cultural Relations
- Greece - Hellenic Republic Ministry of Foreign Affairs,
- Hungary - Hungarian Cultural Institute
- Ireland - Culture Ireland
- Italy - Società Dante Alighieri, Ministry of Foreign Affairs and International Cooperation (Italy)
- Latvia - Investment and Development Agency of Latvia
- Lithuania - Lithuanian Culture Institute
- Luxembourg - Ministry of Foreign Affairs (Luxembourg)
- Malta - Arts Council Malta
- Netherlands - DutchCulture, centre for international cooperation
- Poland - Ministry of Foreign Affairs of the Republic of Poland Adam Mickiewicz Institute
- Portugal - Instituto Camões
- Romania - Romanian Cultural Institute
- Slovakia - Ministry of Foreign and European Affairs of the Slovak Republik
- Slovenia - Slovenian Ministry of Culture
- Spain - Instituto Cervantes, AECID
- Sweden - Swedish Institute
- Ukraine - Ukrainian Institute (associate member)
- United Kingdom - British Council (associate member)

== See also ==
- Culture of Europe
- European integration
- Pan-European identity
