= Institute for Foreign Cultural Relations =

German organisation for cultural exchange

- Institut für Auslandsbeziehungen
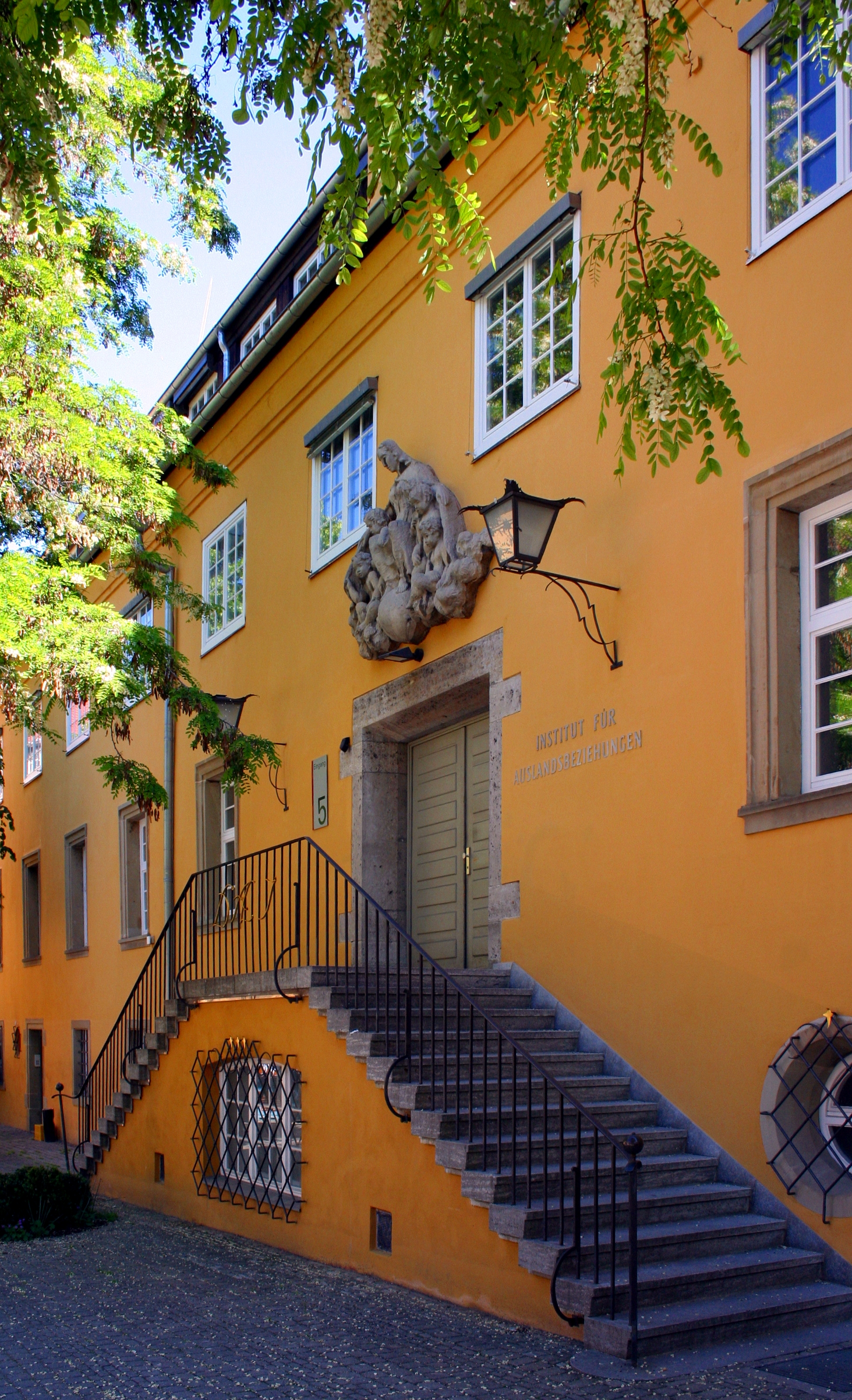
- The Altes Waisenhaus located in Charlottenplatz, Stuttgart, has been the headquarters of the organisation since 1925
- Abbreviation: ifa
- Predecessor: Museum and Institute of German Foreign Affairs and the Promotion of German Interests Abroad
- Formation: January 10, 1917; 109 years ago
- Established: 1949
- Founder: Theodor Wanner
- Official language: German
- Secretary General: Gitte Zschoch
- Honorary President: Daniela Schwarzer
- Publication: Kulturaustausch
- Funding: Federal Foreign Office
- Website: ifa.de/en
- Formerly called: German Foreign Institute

The Institute for Foreign Cultural Relations (German: Institut für Auslandsbeziehungen, stylised ifa), is an intermediary organisation funded by the Federal Foreign Office of Germany dedicated to international relations as well as cultural and social policy. It is well known for sponsoring art exhibitions.

== History ==
The organisation's forerunner was founded on 10 January 1917 by German businessman Theodor Wanner (1875–1955) as the Museum and Institute of German Foreign Affairs and the Promotion of German Interests Abroad (Museum und Institut zur Kunde des Auslandsdeutschtums und zur Förderung deutscher Interessen im Ausland) before being renamed the German Foreign Institute (Deutsches Ausland-Institut; DAI) the same year. In the wake of the First World War, the DAI aimed to rebuild Germany's reputation in the world through cultural exchanges. It was renamed the Institut für Auslandsbeziehungen in 1949, with an official inauguration by West German president Theodor Heuss in 1951.

In 2024, it was announced that after more than 20 years of operation by public broadcaster Deutsche Welle to promote interreligious dialogue, the portal Qantara.de would be restructured and transferred to management by the IFA.
