= List of Spanish desserts =

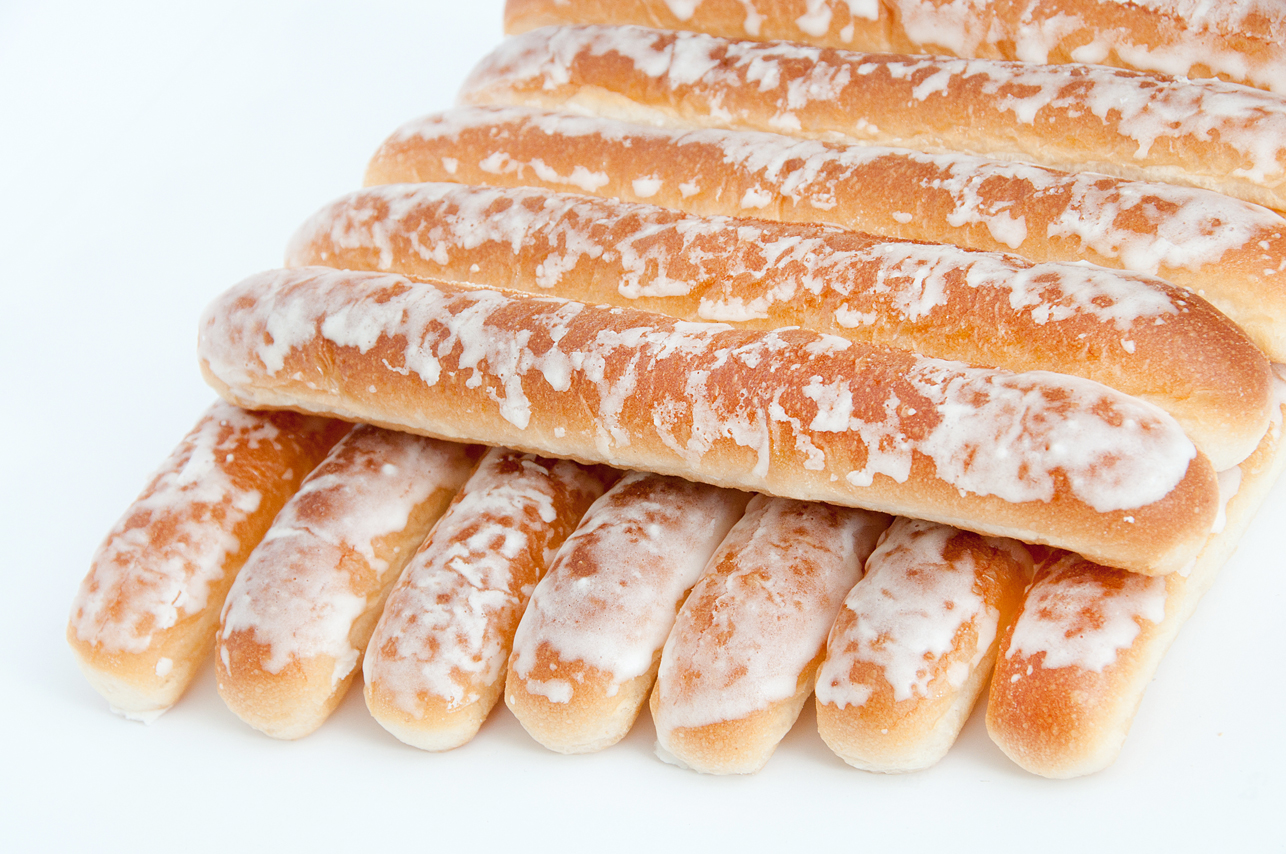
Fartons

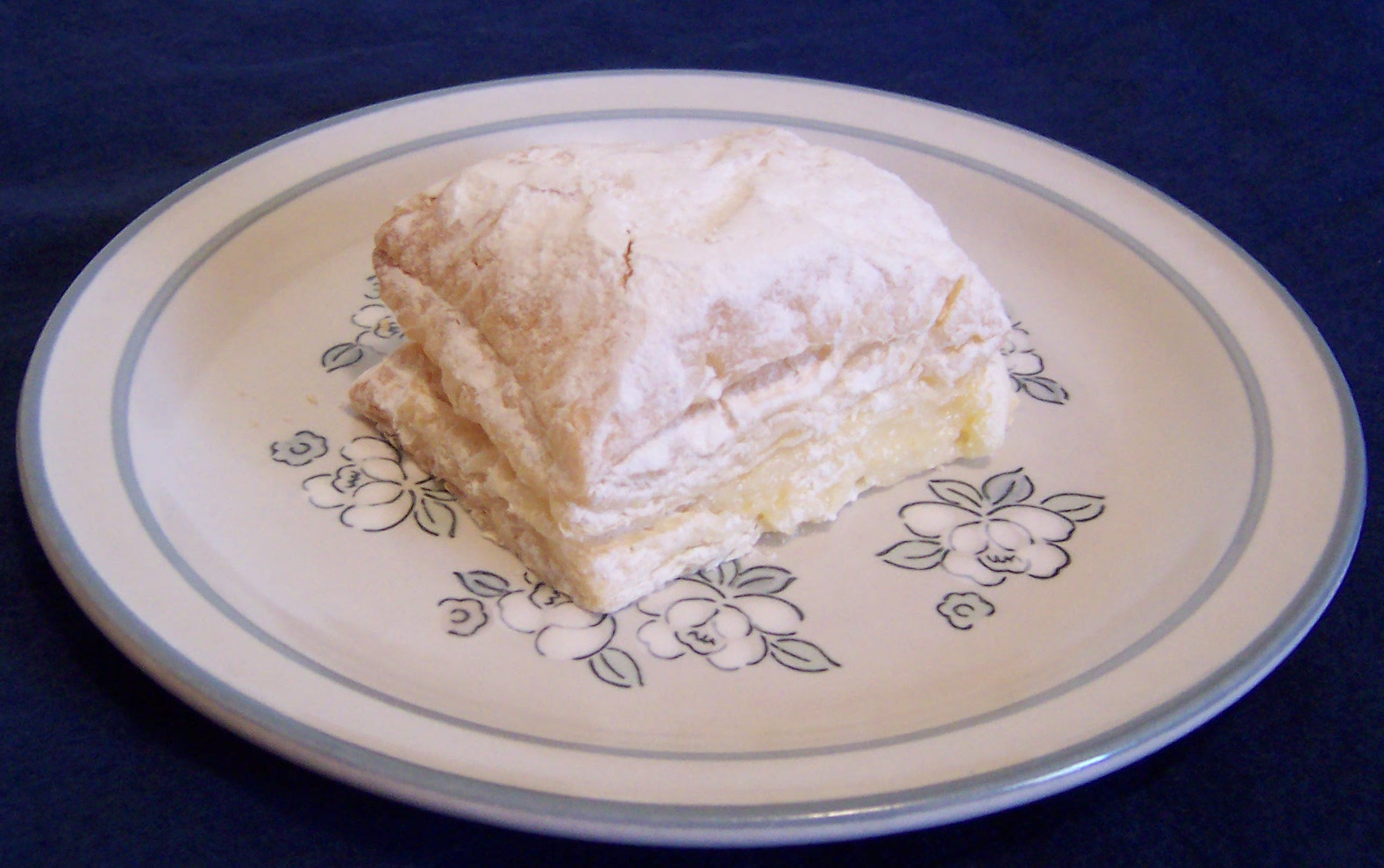
Miguelitos

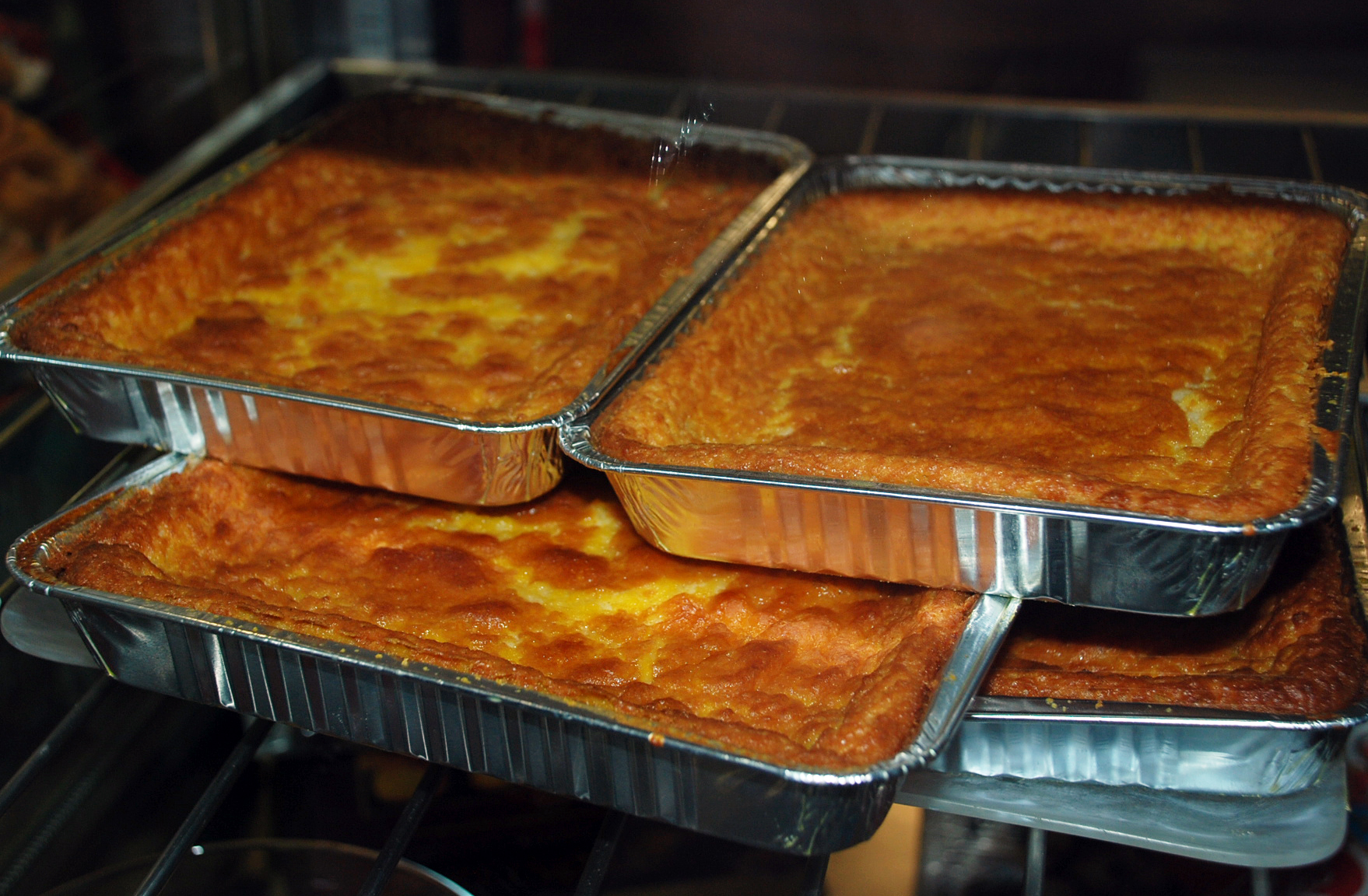
Quesada Pasiega

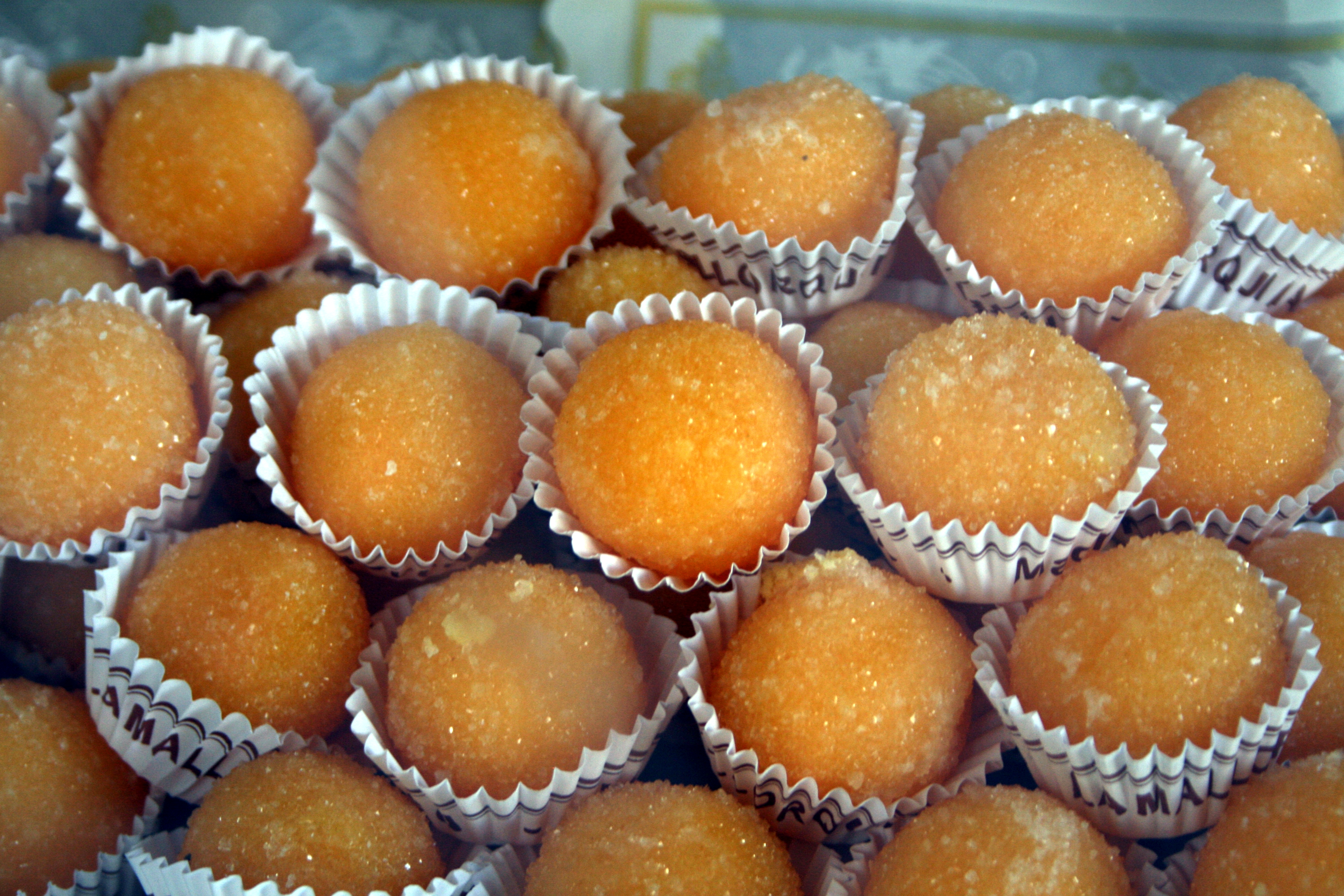
Yemas de Santa Teresa in the typical tarlet papers

This is a list of notable Spanish desserts.

== Spanish desserts ==
- Arroz con leche – Dish made from rice mixed with water or milk
- Brazo de gitano – Sponge cake formed in a spiral roll, with different filling
- Buñuelo – Fried dough balls
- Carolina – Pastry of Bilbao, Spain
- Casadiella – Typical dessert from Asturias
- Churro – Fried-dough pastry
- Crema catalana – Custard dessert with hard caramel top
- Coca – Catalan pastry
- Dátiles rellenos – Stuffed dates from Spanish cuisine
- Ensaïmada – Pastry product from Mallorca (Balearic Islands)
- Fartons – Spanish confectionery sweets
- Flan – Custard dessert with soft caramel on top
- Golmajería – Type of Spanish pastries
- Leche frita – Traditional Spanish dessert, Spanish sweet typical of northern Spain
- Manjar blanco – Dessert of milk or cream and sugar, thickened and flavoured
- Mantecado – Andalusian shortbread
- Marañuela – Spanish sweet
- Mazapán – Confection of sugar and almond flour
- Miguelitos – Puff pastry dessert from Spain
- Natillas – Spanish custard dish of milk and eggs, variety of custards
- Pestiños – Andalusian sweet pastry
- Pionono – Spanish pastry
- Polvorón – Andalusian shortbread
- Quesada Pasiega – Dessert from Cantabria, Spain
- Roscón de reyes – Type of cake associated with Epiphany
- Sobao – Spanish delicacy
- Tarta de queso vasca – Crustless cheesecake
- Tarta de Santiago – Traditional dessert from Galicia
- Tecula mecula
- Torrija – Dish of fried bread and eggs
- Turrón – Southern European nougat confection
- Xuixo – Deep-fried pastry
- Yemas de Santa Teresa – Spanish sweet

== See also ==
- List of desserts
- List of Spanish dishes
- Spanish cuisine
