= Cantabrian cuisine =

Seafood from the Cantabrian Sea

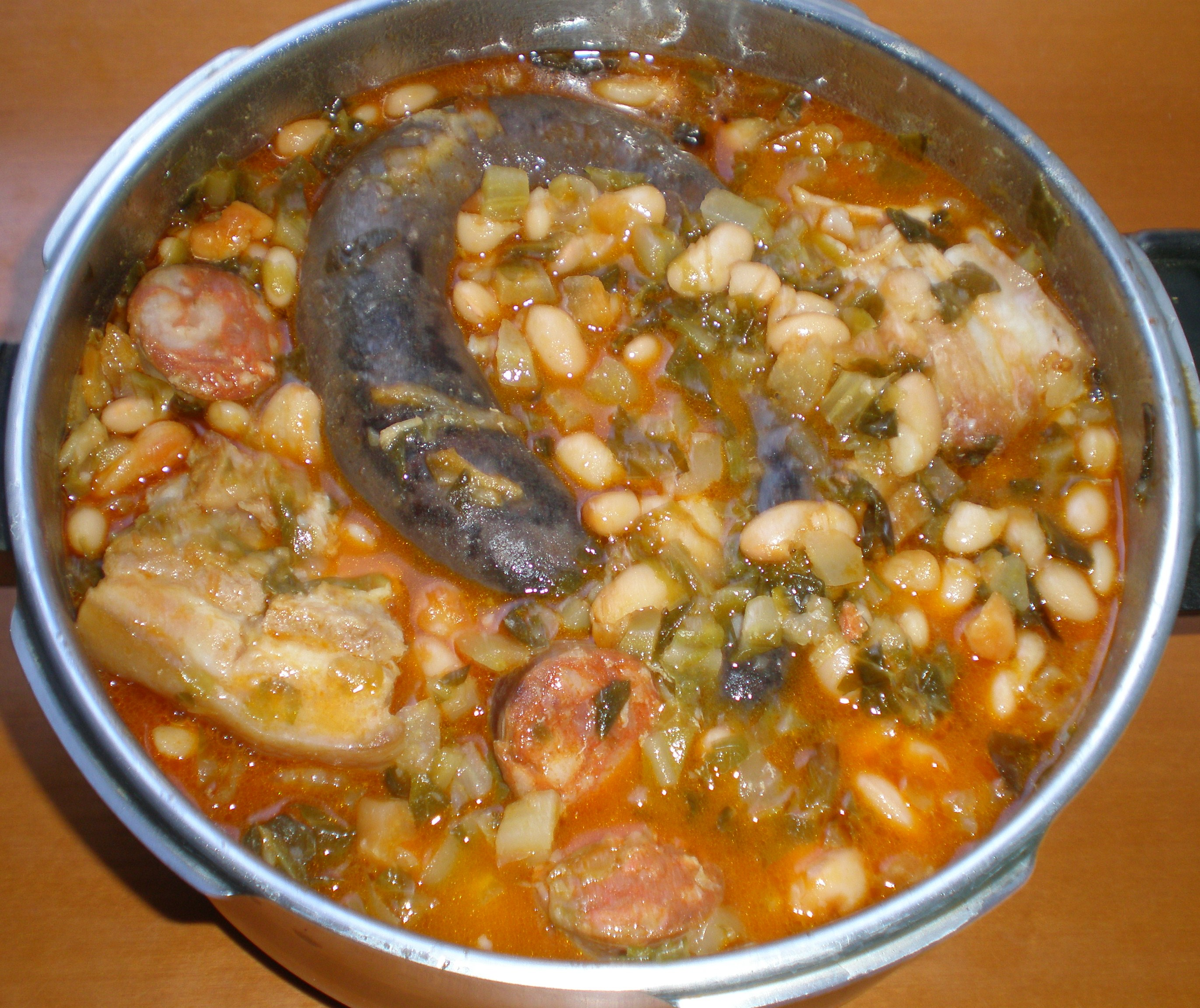
The cocido montañés, the most representative dish of Cantabrian cuisine.

Cantabrian cuisine is the cuisine from Cantabria, an autonomous community in northern Spain. It includes seafood from the Cantabrian Sea, salmon and trout from the upper basins of the rivers, vegetables and dairy products from the valleys, and veal and game from the Cantabrian Mountains.

== Fish and seafood ==
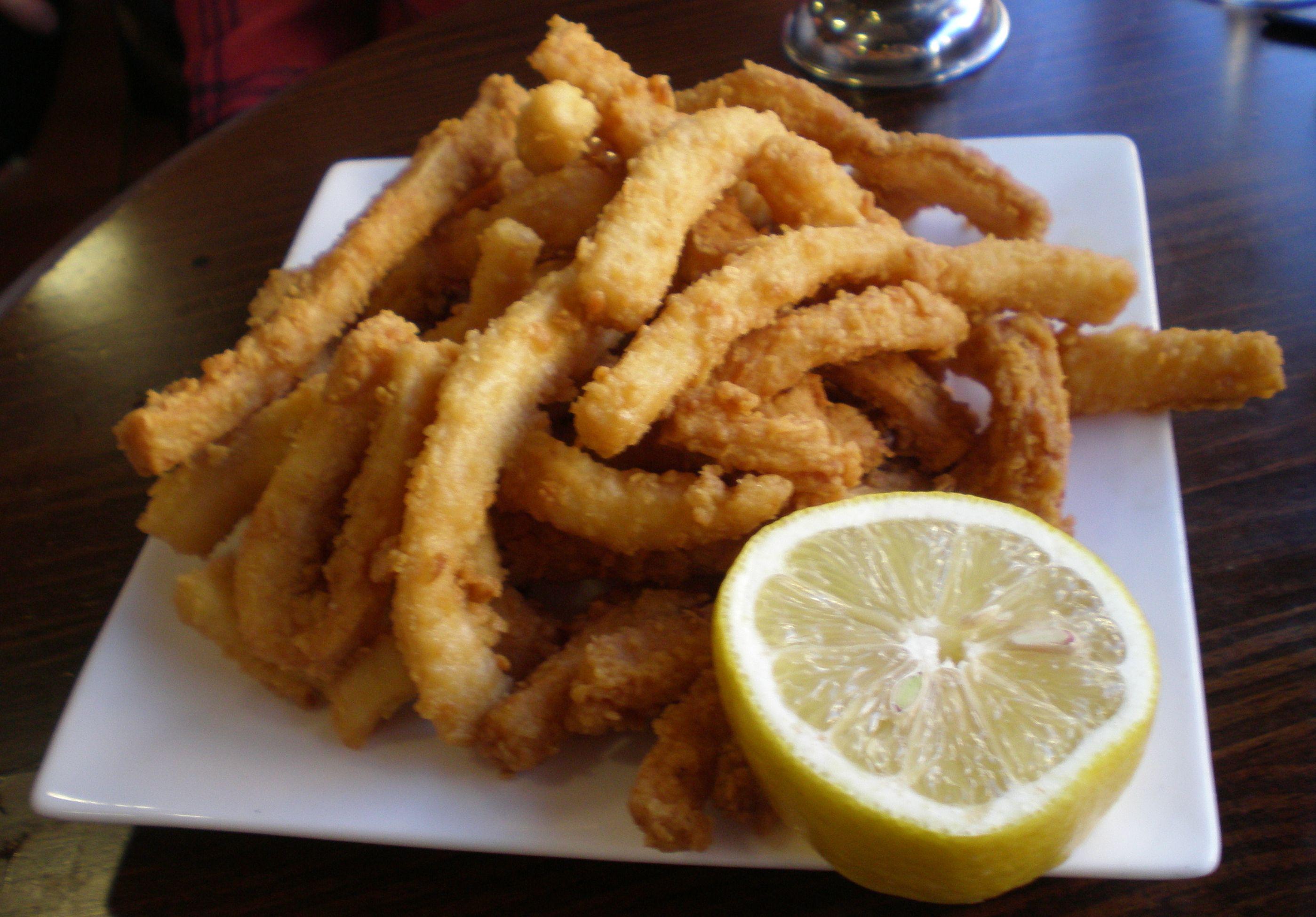
Rabas are a squid-based snack commonly consumed by Cantabrians.

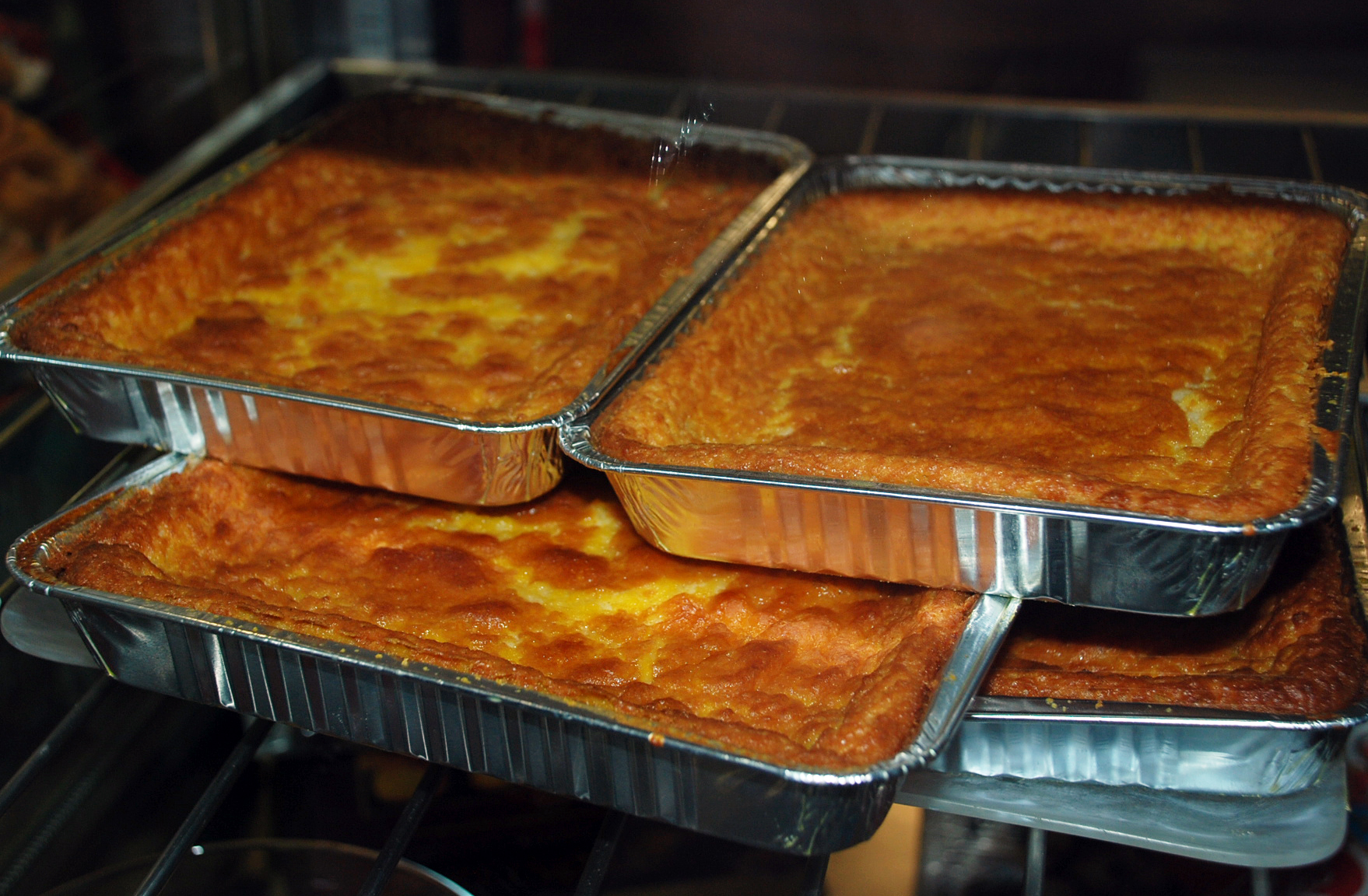
Quesada pasiega

Seafood is widely used, from the entire coast and the Bay of Santander in particular, including clams, mussels, pod razors, cockles, crabs, barnacles, crayfish, snails, lobster, and squid. Fish include sea bass, hake, scorpion fish, anchovy, sardine, and albacore.

The albacore or bonito del norte is used in one of the most typical dishes of the region: marmita or sorropotún. Some of the most renowned Cantabrian dishes are hake in green sauce (merluza en salsa verde), squid with onions (maganos encebollados) and cuttlefish in its ink sauce (cachon en su tinta), and clam casserole. "Rabas" (deep-fried squid sticks) is the most popular snack on the coast, typically companied with a white wine or a vermouth.

Processed anchovies from the town of Santoña are appreciated worldwide.

== Meats ==
Veal is widely consumed, often from the Tudanca cattle. The National Cattle Fair of Torrelavega, the largest cattle fair in Spain, is held in Cantabria. Game is also of high quality: deer, roe deer, and wild boar. Pork is a key element for the cocido montañés, literally 'mountain stew', with beans, cabbage, and other ingredients.

== Pastry ==
Cantabrian pastries include the traditional sobaos and quesada pasiega. Puff pastry is widely used, with different names in different regions: corbatas in Unquera and San Vicente de la Barquera, polkas in Torrelavega, and sacristanes in Liérganes. Other notables sweets are frisuelos and canónigos, both of Liébana; corazones of Liérganes, the palucos of Cabezón de la Sal; and the tortos and pantortillas of Reinosa. Other desserts not of Cantabrian origin are rice pudding, natillas, leche frita, and fruit jams.

Dairy products include Cantabrian cream cheese; picón Bejes-Tresviso in Tresviso and its neighboring town; smoked cheeses (named for specific places) such as Áliva or Pido; and the Quesucos de Liébana, made with a mixture of cow and sheep milk.

== Alcoholic beverages ==
Orujo is the Cantabrian pomace brandy. Historically, cider and chacoli or txakoli wine were a specialty; after a major and long-term decline, they are recovering.

Two Spanish wines (vinos de la tierra) with denominación de origen calificada (protected geographical status) from Cantabria are Costa de Cantabria and Liébana, named after the localities of their production.
