= Soufflé =

Egg-based baked dish

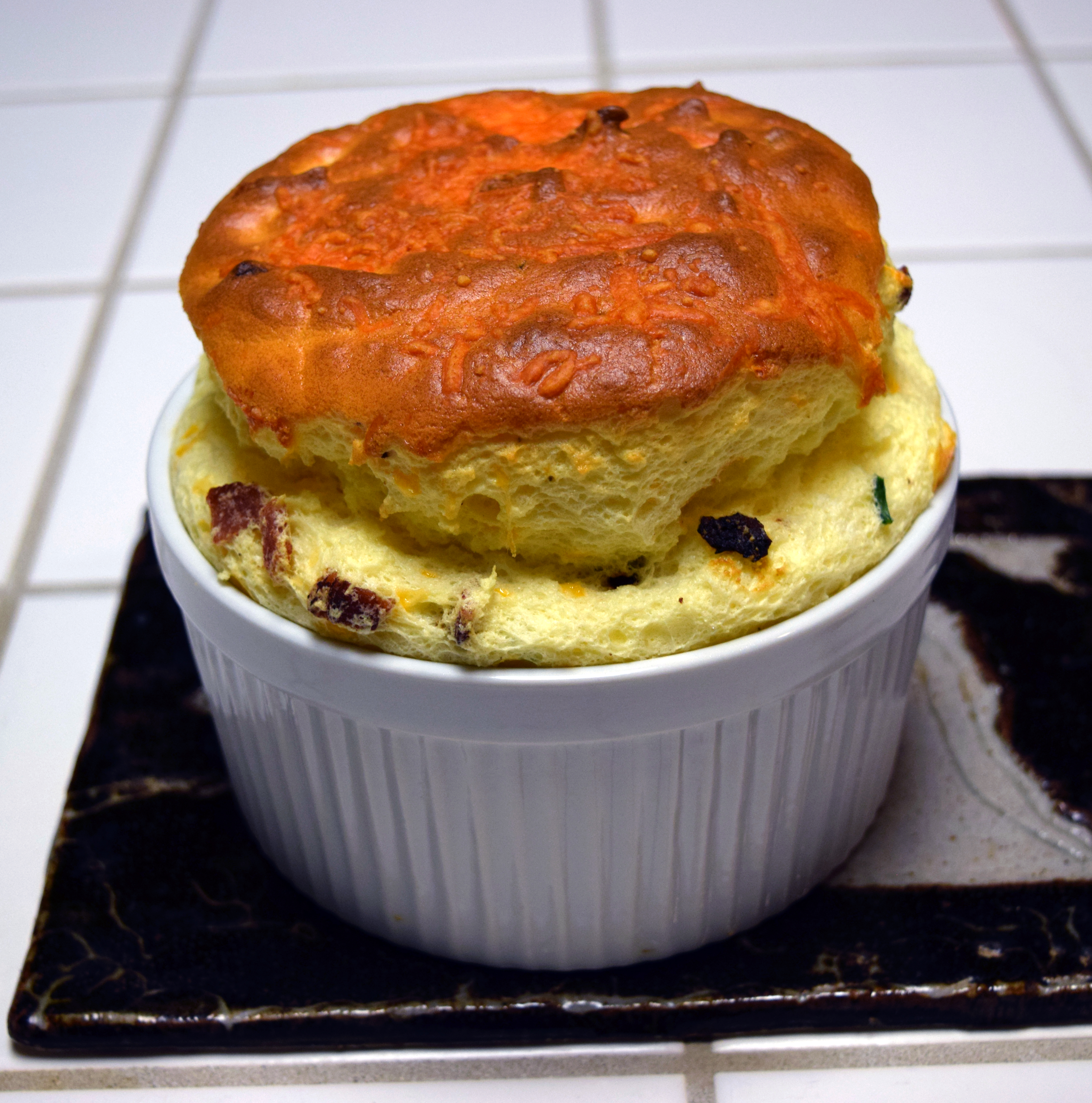
- Bacon and cheddar cheese soufflé with chives
- Type: Egg-based dish
- Place of origin: France
- Main ingredients: Egg yolks, egg whites

A soufflé (French pronunciation: [sufle]) is a baked egg dish originating in France in the early 18th century. Combined with various other ingredients, it can be served as a savoury main dish or sweetened as a dessert. The word soufflé is the past participle of the French verb souffler, which means to blow, breathe, inflate or puff.

== History ==
The earliest mention of soufflé is attributed to the French master cook, François Massialot, in the early 18th century. The development and popularisation of the soufflé is usually traced to the French chef Marie-Antoine Carême in the early nineteenth century.

== Ingredients and preparation ==
Soufflés are typically prepared from two basic components:

1. a flavored crème pâtissière, cream sauce or béchamel, or a purée as the base
2. egg whites beaten to a soft peak

The base provides the flavor, and the egg whites provide the "lift" or puffiness to the dish. Foods commonly used to flavor the base include herbs, cheese and vegetables for savory soufflés; and jam, fruits, berries, chocolate, banana and lemon for dessert soufflés.

Soufflés are generally baked in ramekins or soufflé dishes: these are typically glazed, flat-bottomed, round porcelain containers with unglazed bottoms, vertical or nearly vertical sides and fluted exterior borders. The ramekin, or another baking vessel, may be coated with a thin film of butter to prevent the soufflé from sticking. Some preparations also include adding a coating of sugar, bread crumbs, or a grated hard cheese such as parmesan inside the ramekin in addition to the butter; some cooks believe this allows the soufflé to rise more easily.

After being cooked, a soufflé is puffed up and fluffy, and it will generally fall after 5 or 10 minutes (as risen dough does). It may be served with a sauce atop the soufflé, such as a sweet dessert sauce, or with a sorbet or ice cream on the side. When served, the top of a soufflé may be punctured with serving utensils to separate it into individual servings. This can also enable a sauce to integrate into the dish.

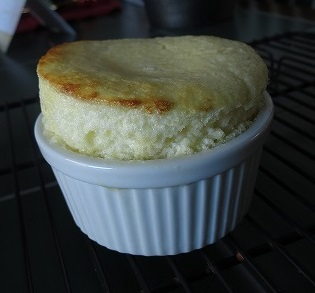
Lemon soufflé

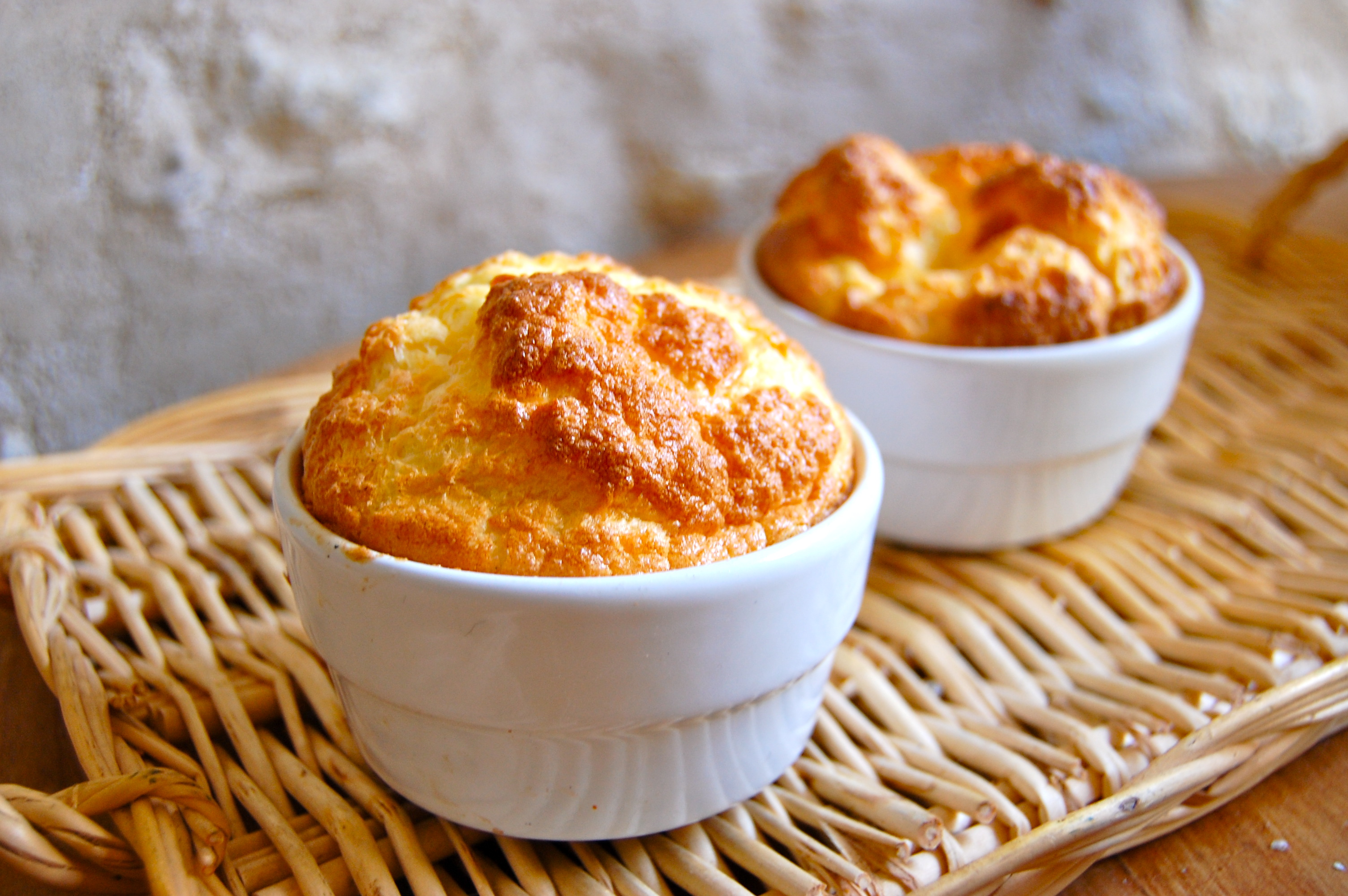
Cheese soufflés

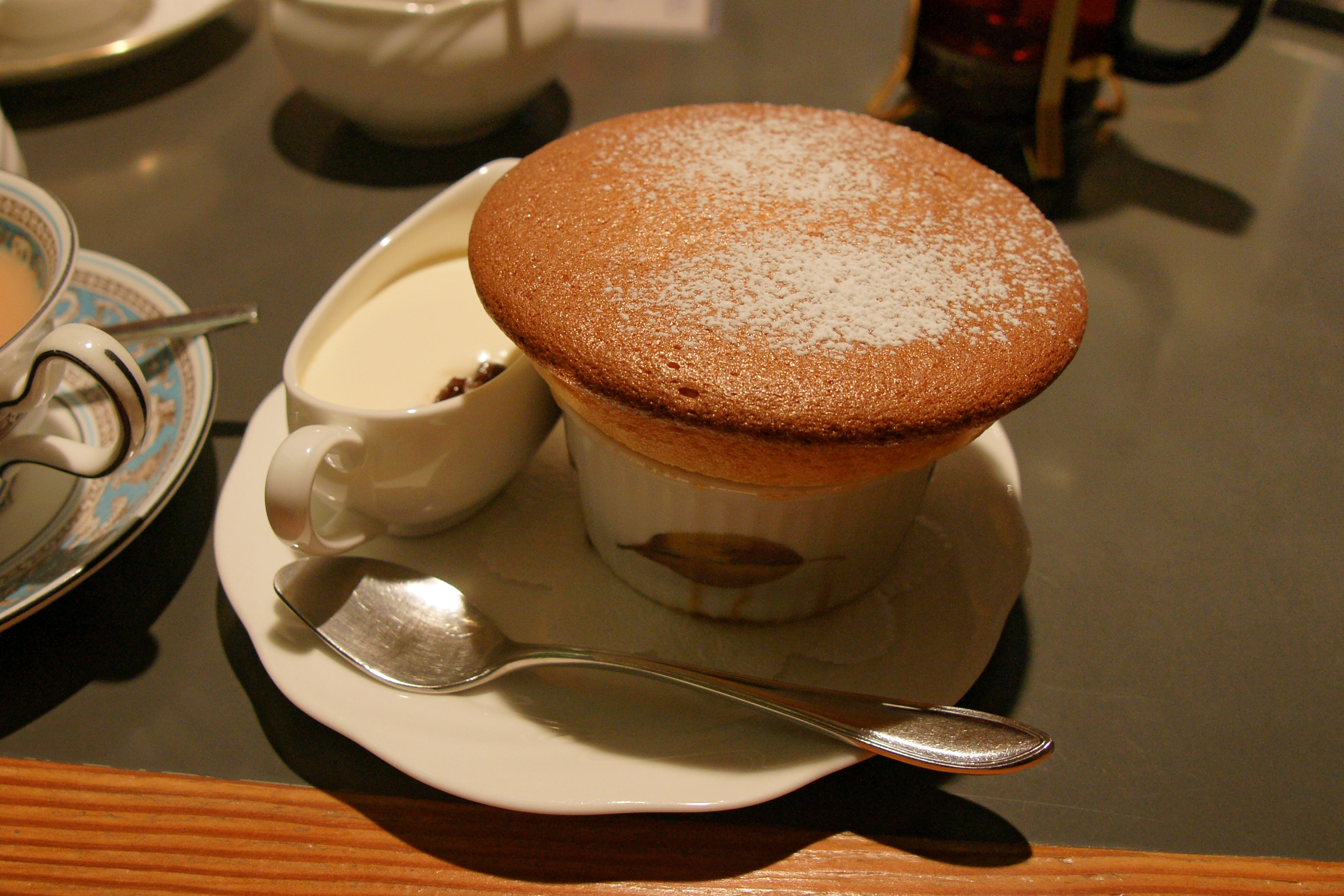
A soufflé at a Japanese restaurant

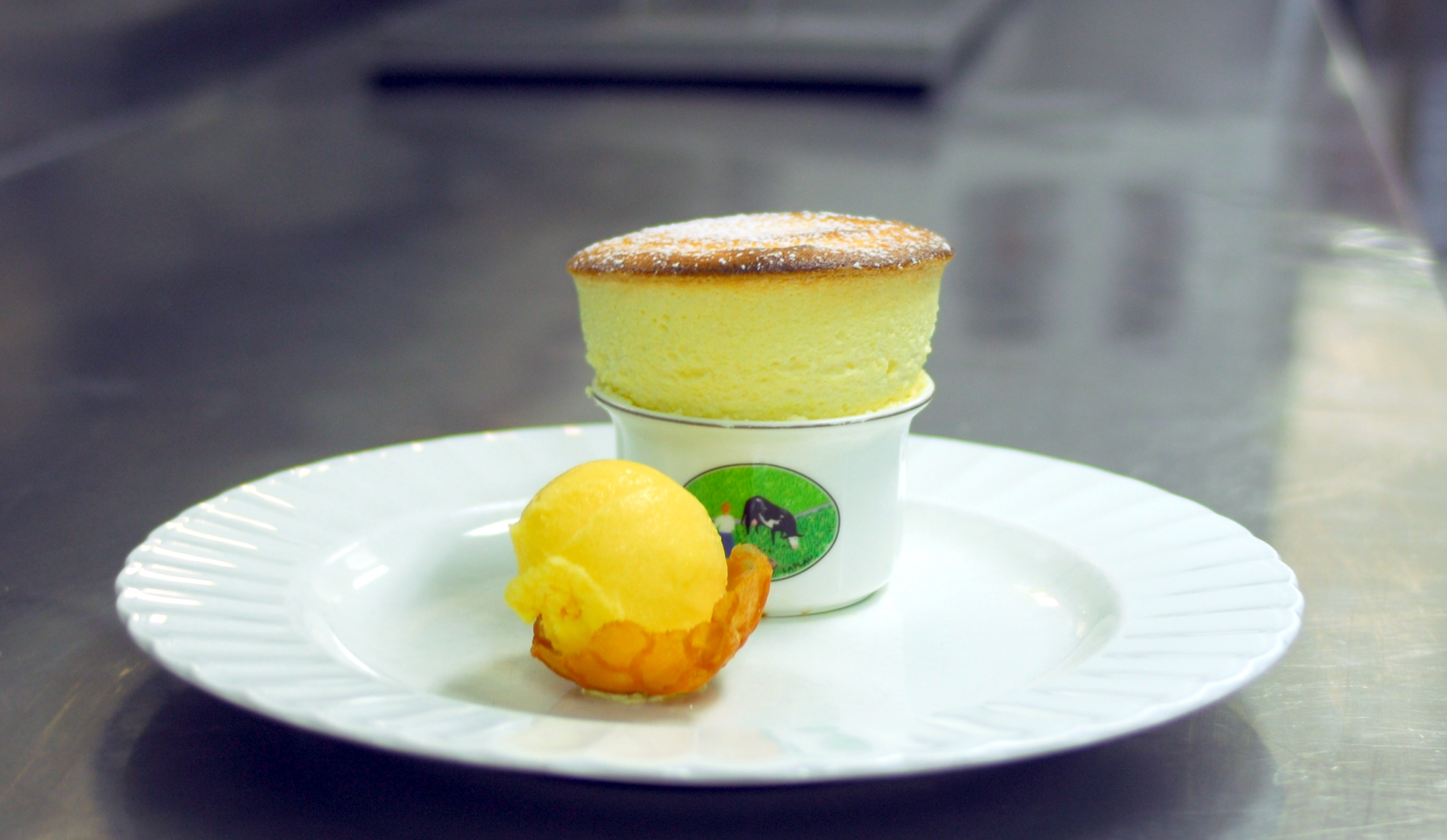
Soufflé in a ramekin

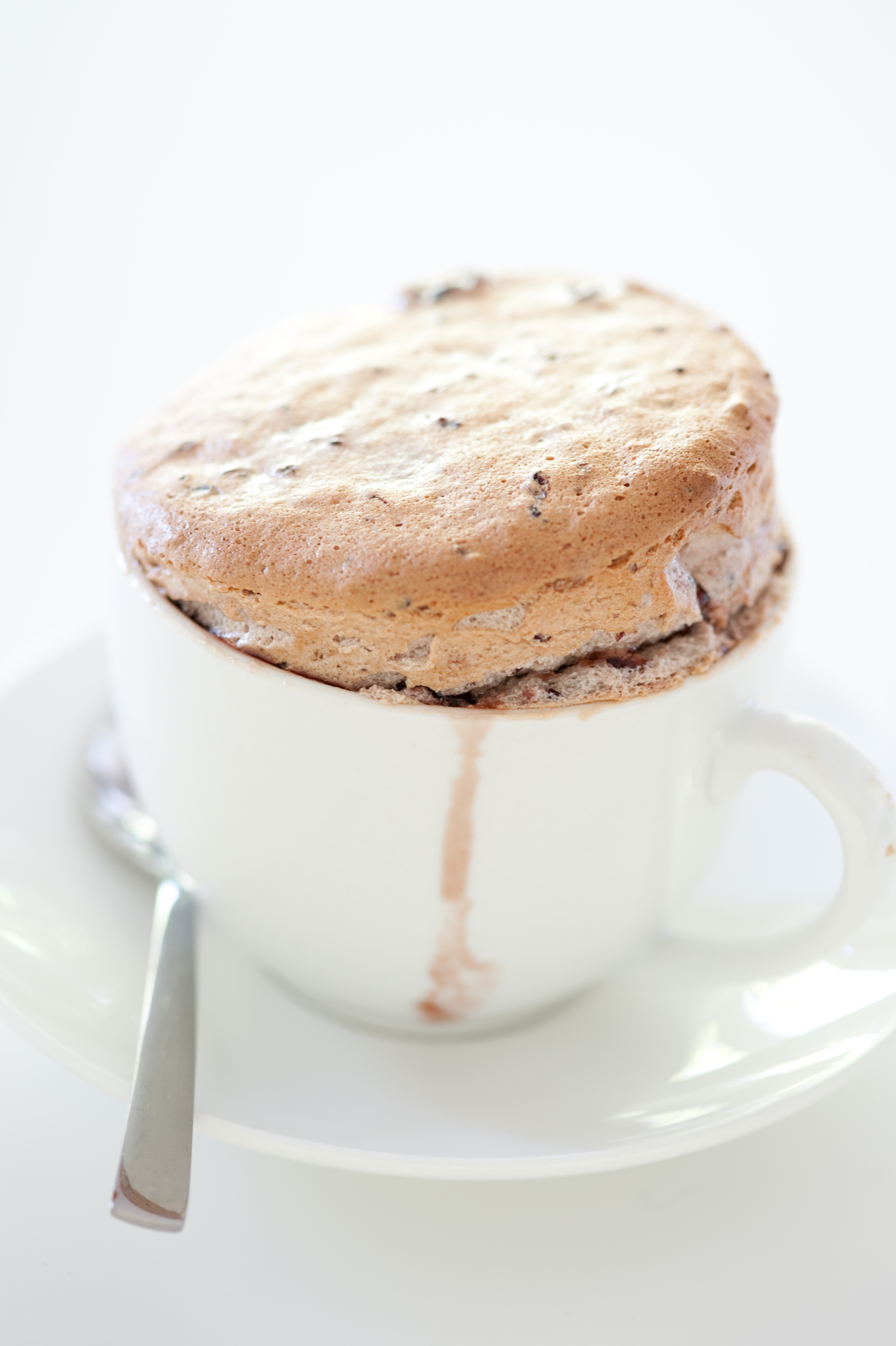
Berry soufflé in a coffee cup

== Variations ==
There are a number of both savory and sweet soufflé flavor variations. Savory soufflés often include cheese, and vegetables such as spinach, carrot and herbs, and may sometimes incorporate poultry, bacon, ham, or seafood for a more substantial dish. Sweet soufflés may be based on a chocolate or fruit sauce (lemon or raspberry, for example) and are often served with a dusting of powdered sugar. Frugal recipes sometimes emphasize the possibilities for making soufflés from leftovers.

A soufflé may be served alone, with ice cream, fruit, or a sauce.

Apple soufflé is made by lining a cake tin with pureed rice boiled in sweetened milk and baking it until it sets. The rice "border" is filled with thickened apple marmalade and whipped egg whites and baked until it rises.

=== Soufflé Rothschild ===
Soufflé Rothschild is a sweet soufflé created by Marie-Antoine Carême. The dish was named for James Mayer de Rothschild. The original recipe included candied fruit that had been macerated in Danziger Goldwasser before the dish was cooked; later recipes replace Goldwasser with kirsch, cognac or Grand Marnier.

Soufflé variations

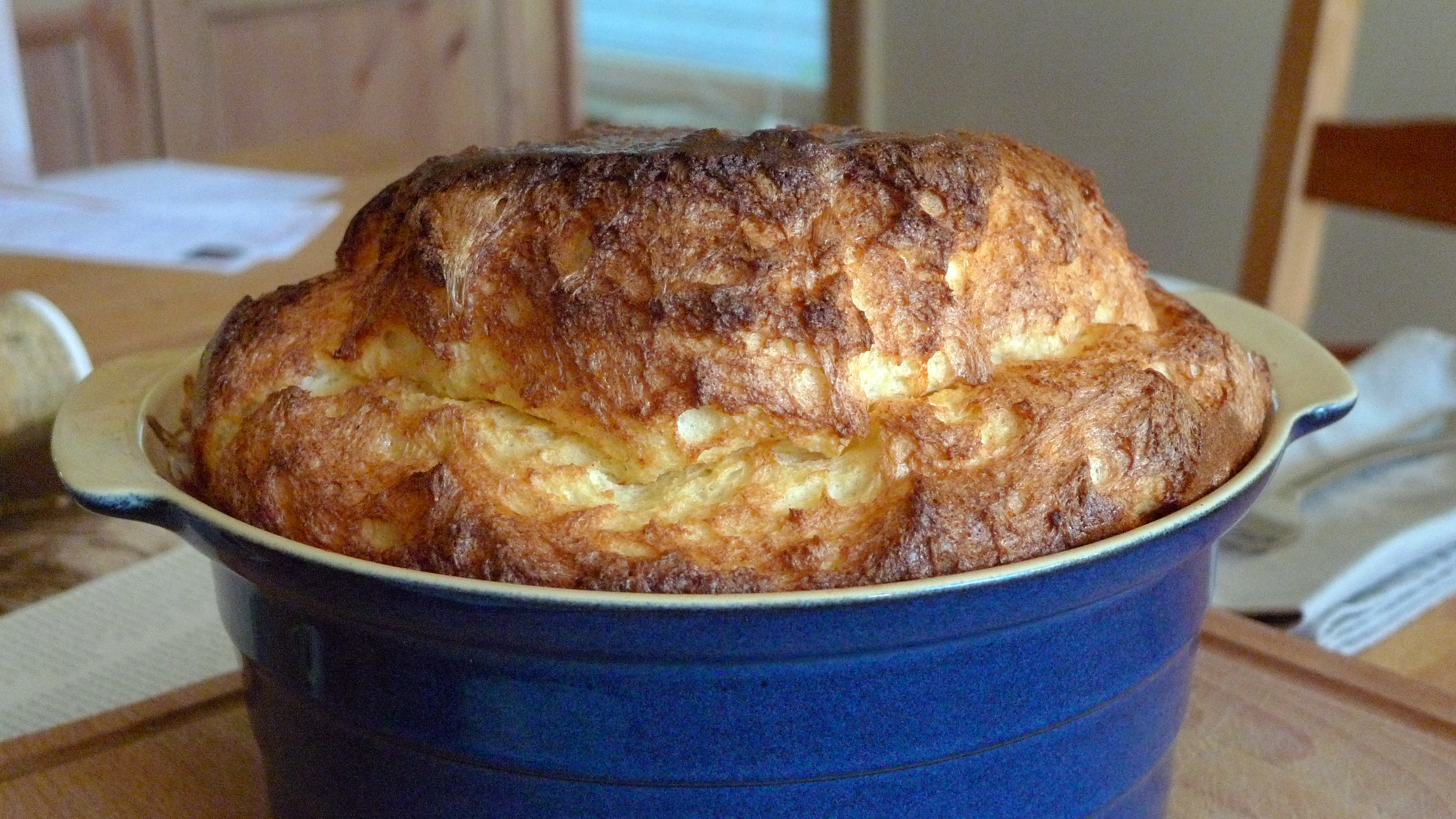
Cheese soufflé in a casserole dish

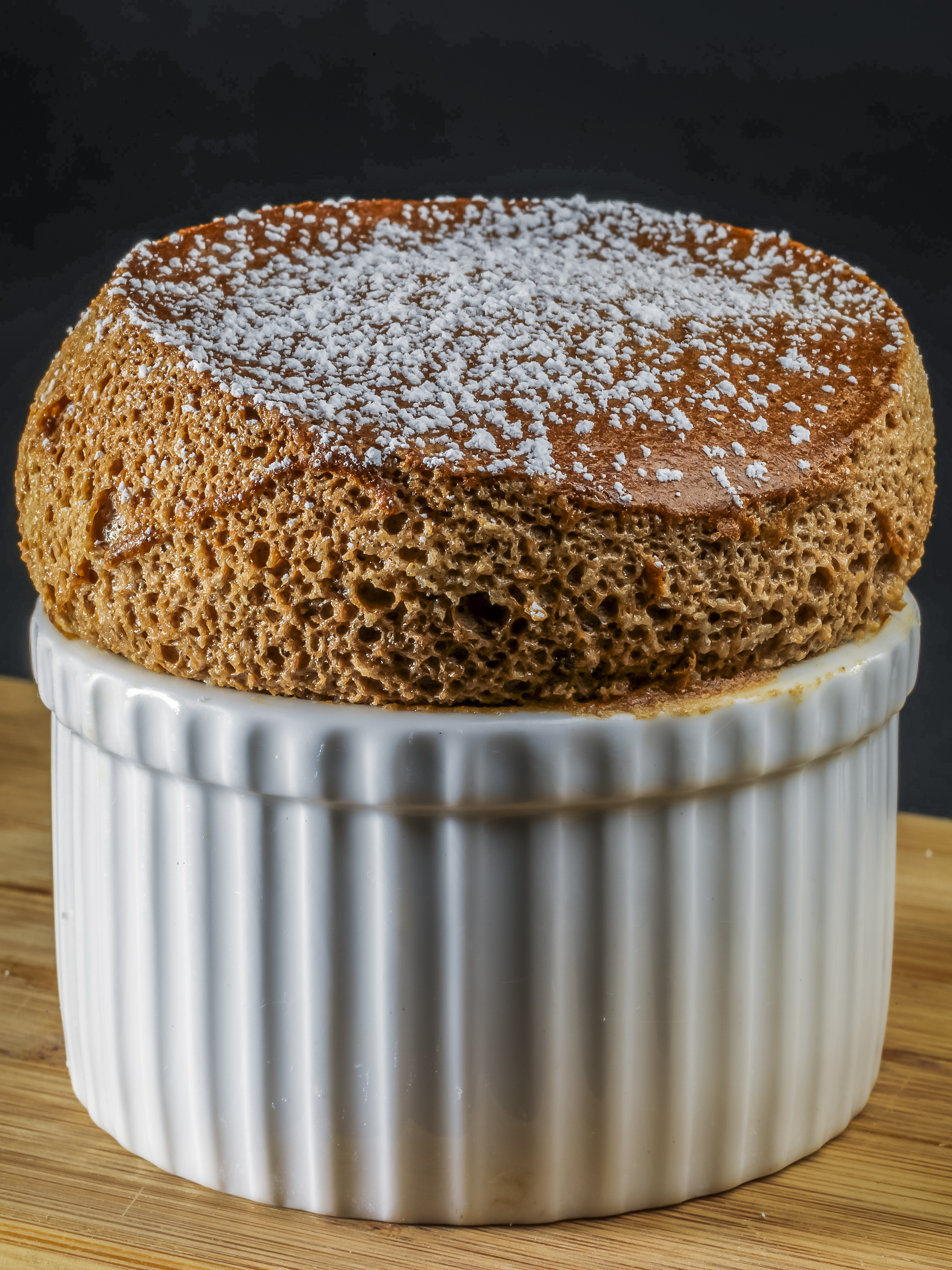
Chocolate soufflé

== See also ==
- Chawanmushi
- Fruit whip
- Salzburger Nockerl
- List of cakes
- List of custard desserts
- List of French dishes
