= Fruit whip =

Dessert made of puréed fruit and whipped egg whites

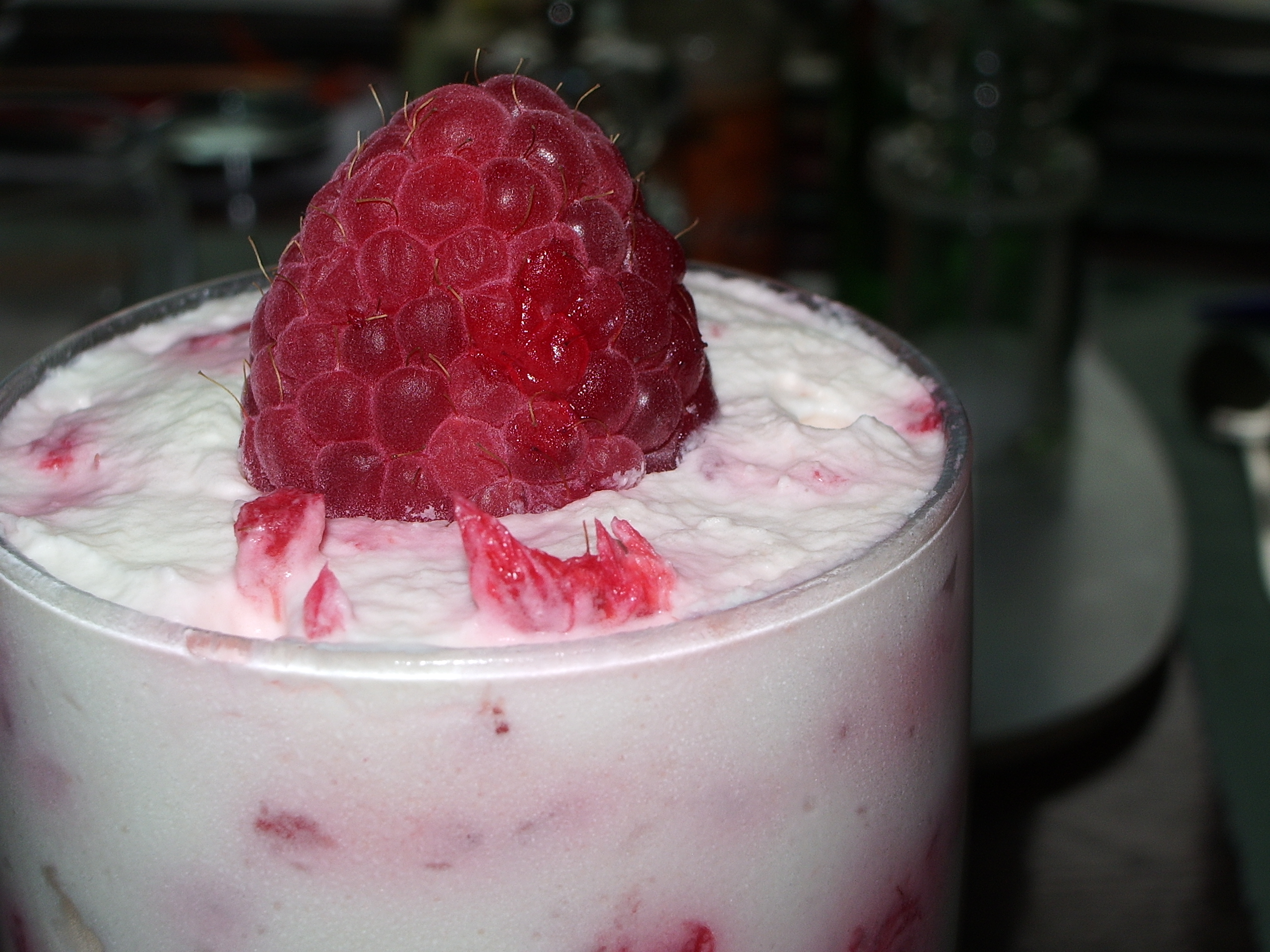

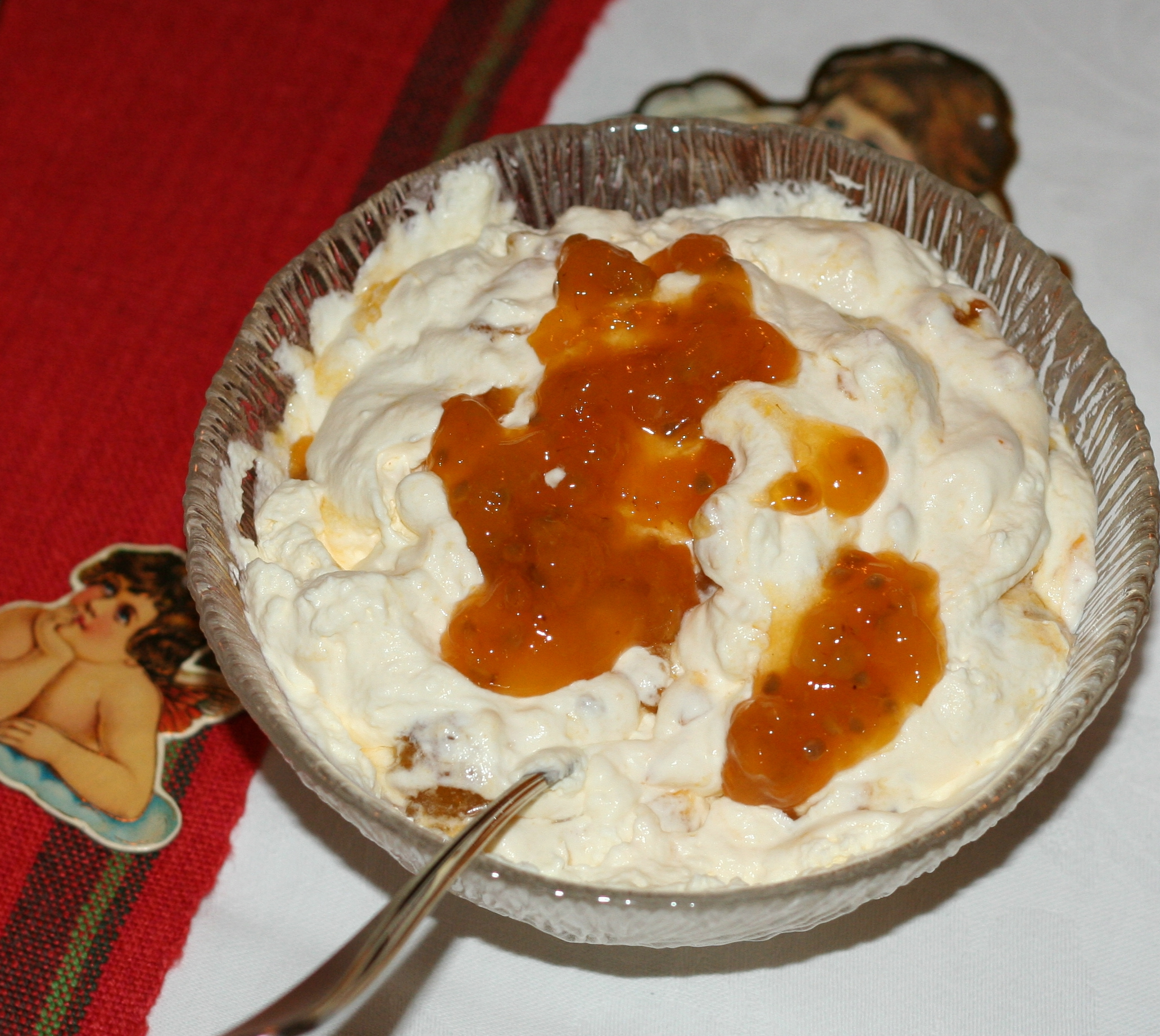
Cloudberry whip

Fruit whips are desserts made from puréed fruit and whipped egg whites. Almost any raw, dried, or cooked fruit may be used, such as apple, strawberry, raspberry, apricot, cherry, fig, pineapple, or rhubarb.

Fruit whips are usually uncooked, but some variants are cooked; they may be served plain, with a sauce of fruit juice, custard, or cream, or over a sponge cake or ladyfingers. The uncooked variants are similar to mousse, while the cooked variants are similar to soufflé. There are also variants that use whole eggs, gelatin, or farina.

Fruit whips are normally made by whipping the egg white then mixing in the puréed and sweetened fruit pulp. Some recipes call for using a blender, while others require the fruit to be mashed or sieved.

== Prune whip ==
A classic type of fruit whip is the prune whip, which was a popular dessert during the 1950s. President Dwight Eisenhower enjoyed prune whips. While today they are considered a "vintage" dessert, a contemporary version featuring Armagnac and mascarpone was created by the New Orleans-based dessert chef Bronwen Wyatt.

== See also ==
- Baked apple
- List of desserts
