= Quesada pasiega =

Dessert from Cantabria, Spain

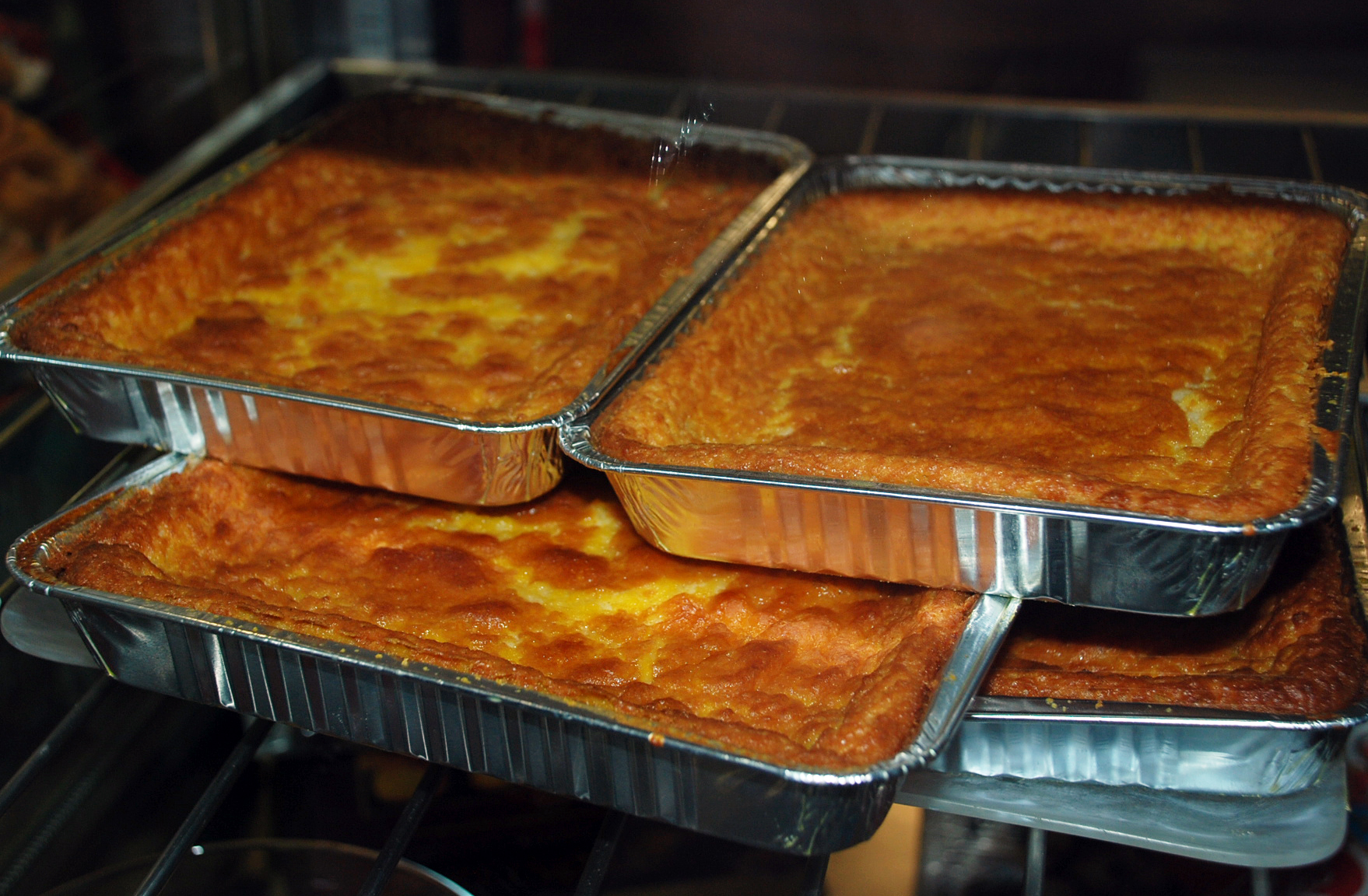
- Quesadas
- Place of origin: Spain
- Region or state: Cantabria
- Main ingredients: Milk, sugar, butter, flour, and eggs

Quesada pasiega is a dessert typical of the region of Cantabria, Spain. It is one of the best-known dishes of Cantabrian cuisine. It has the consistency of a dense pudding, and is made from milk, sugar, butter, wheat flour, and egg, and flavored with lemon zest and cinnamon. It can be served hot or cold.

== See also ==
- Sobao pasiego
