= Deep-fried Mars bar =

Novelty Scottish confectionery

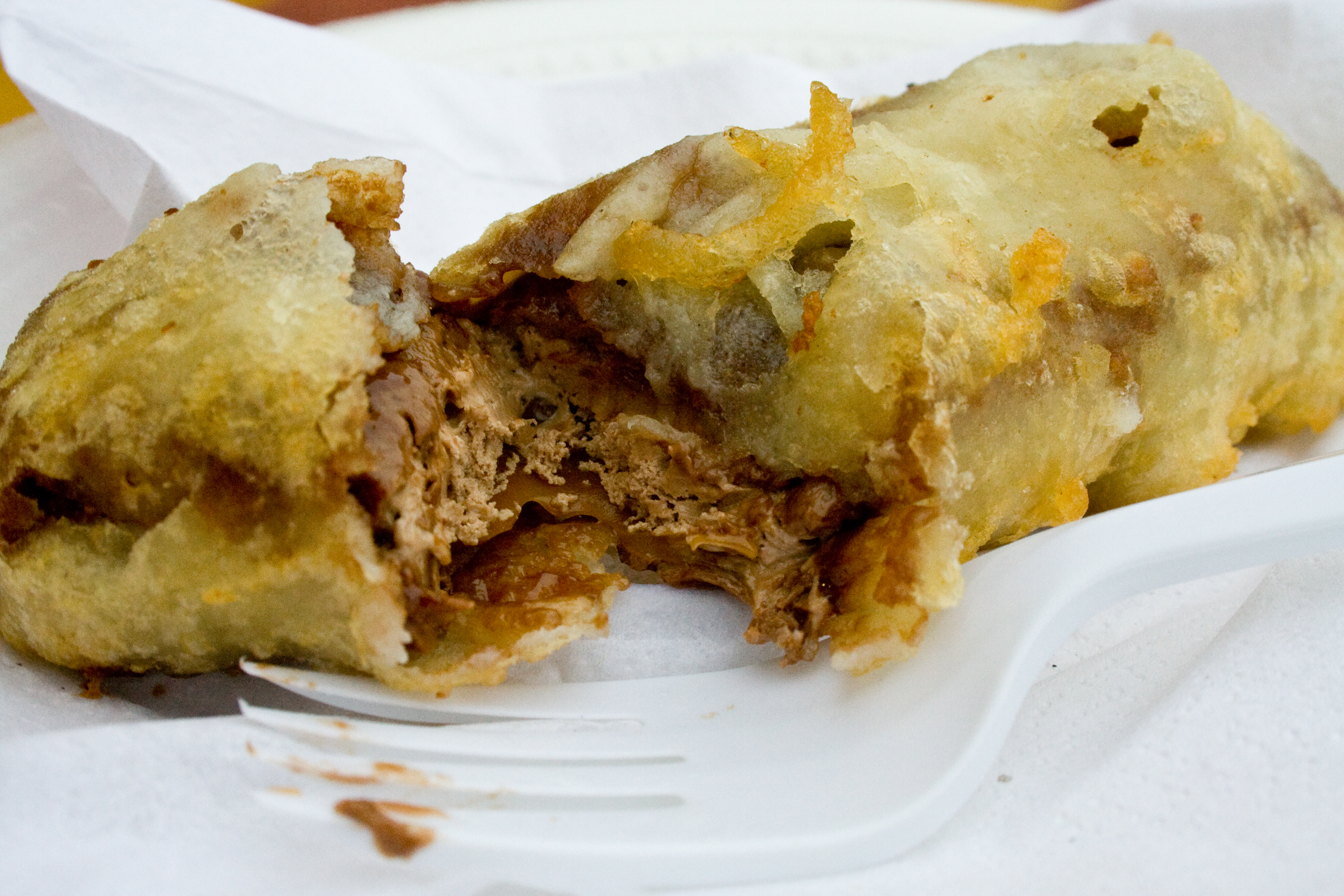
- The cross-section of a deep-fried Mars bar
- Alternative names: Battered Mars bar
- Place of origin: Scotland
- Region or state: Aberdeenshire
- Created by: John Davie
- Serving temperature: Hot
- Main ingredients: Mars bar, batter

A deep-fried Mars bar (also known as a battered Mars bar) is a Mars-brand chocolate bar covered in batter then deep fried in oil. The dish originated at a chip shop in Scotland as a novelty item. Since various mass media began reporting on the practice in the mid-1990s – often as a critical commentary on how unhealthy the Scottish diet was – the popularity of the dish has spread.

== Origin ==
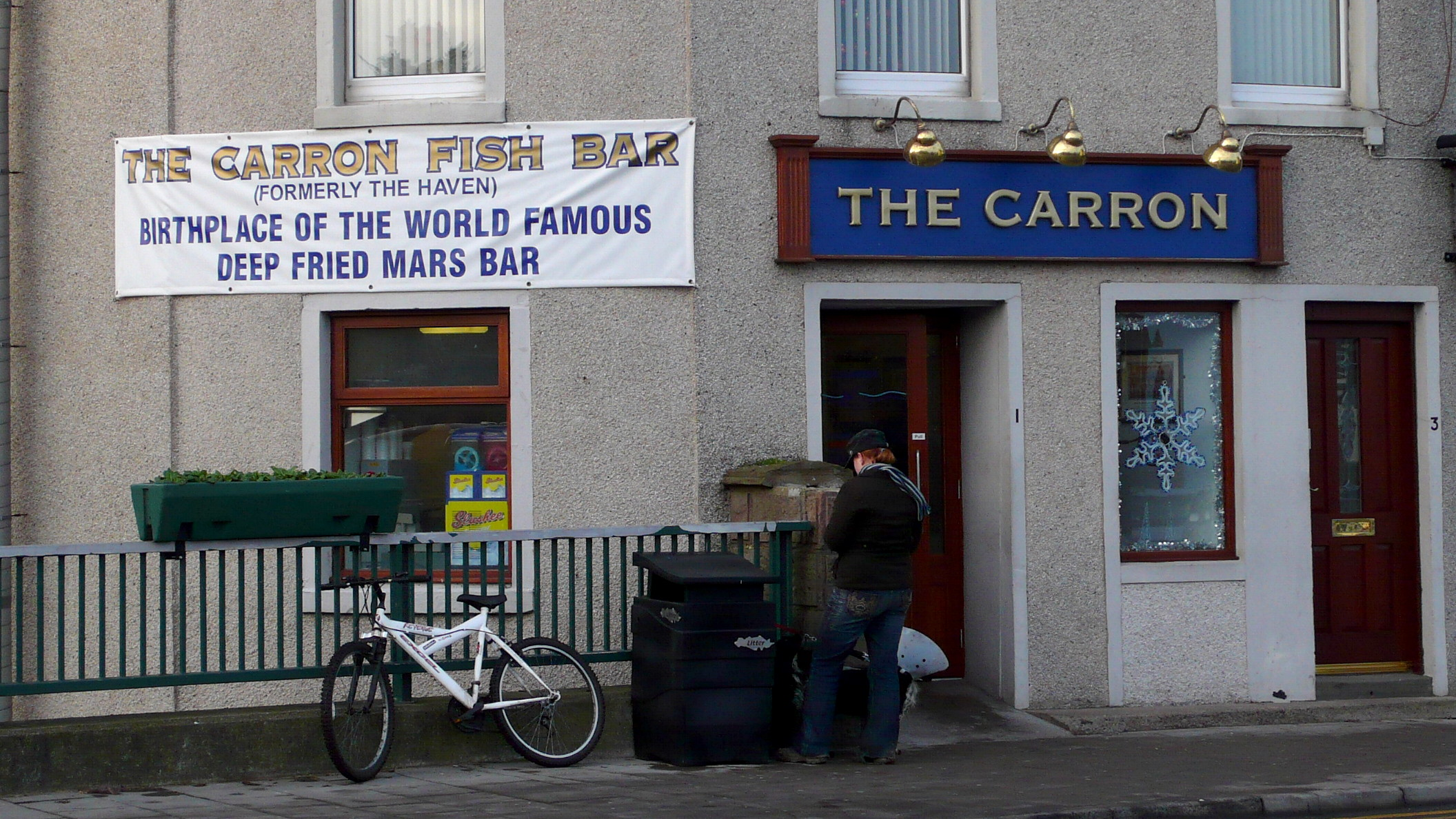
A banner on the Carron Fish Bar in Stonehaven, reading "Birthplace of the World Famous Deep Fried Mars Bar", December 2007

The origins of the deep-fried Mars bar are disputed. John Davie claimed to have invented it in 1992 in the Haven Chip Bar (now the Carron) in Stonehaven, near Aberdeen on Scotland's northeast coast. It received rapidly escalating media attention after Aberdeen Evening Express writer Alastair Dalton reported on 23 August 1995, "HOT chocolate has become this summer's sizzler in Stonehaven chip shop. Mars Bars, deep-fried in batter, are being snapped up by sweet-toothed teenagers. The craze started when the school holidays began and has quickly taken hold says Ingram Mowatt (41), owner of The Haven, Allardice Terrace. " The article included a quote from a Mars spokesperson, who said this was the most unusual way they had come across of enjoying a Mars bar. The following day the story ran the Daily Record in an article titled "Mars supper, please".

Other chip shops have disputed Carron's claim. Tom Cummings, the former owner of Duncan Street Chip Shop in Banff, said that he had sold fried Mars bars in the 1980s and he had copied the recipe from the since defunct Dodie's Chip Shop in Buckie on the Moray Firth coast.

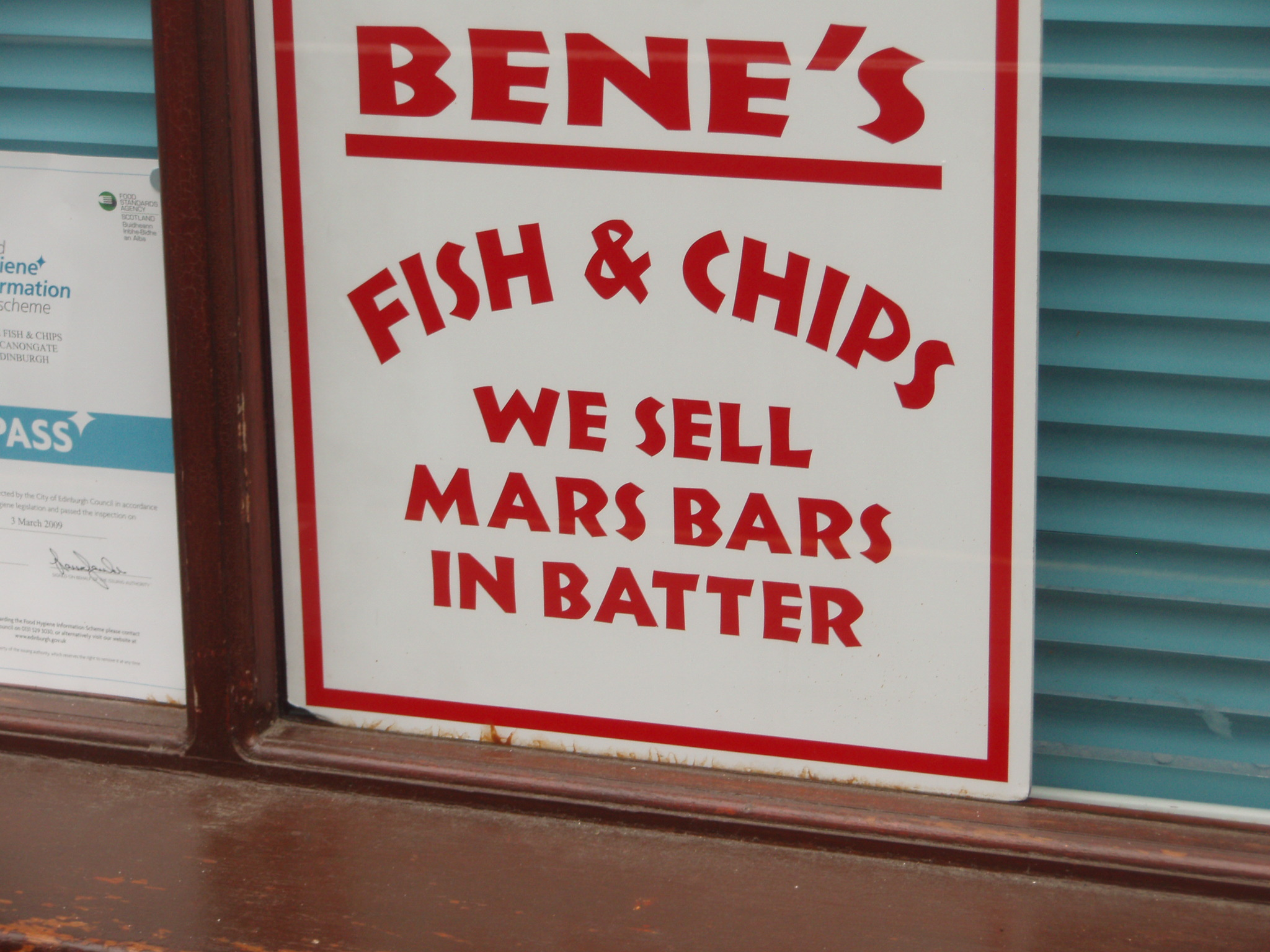
Deep-fried Mars bar advert Edinburgh 2009

== Popularity ==
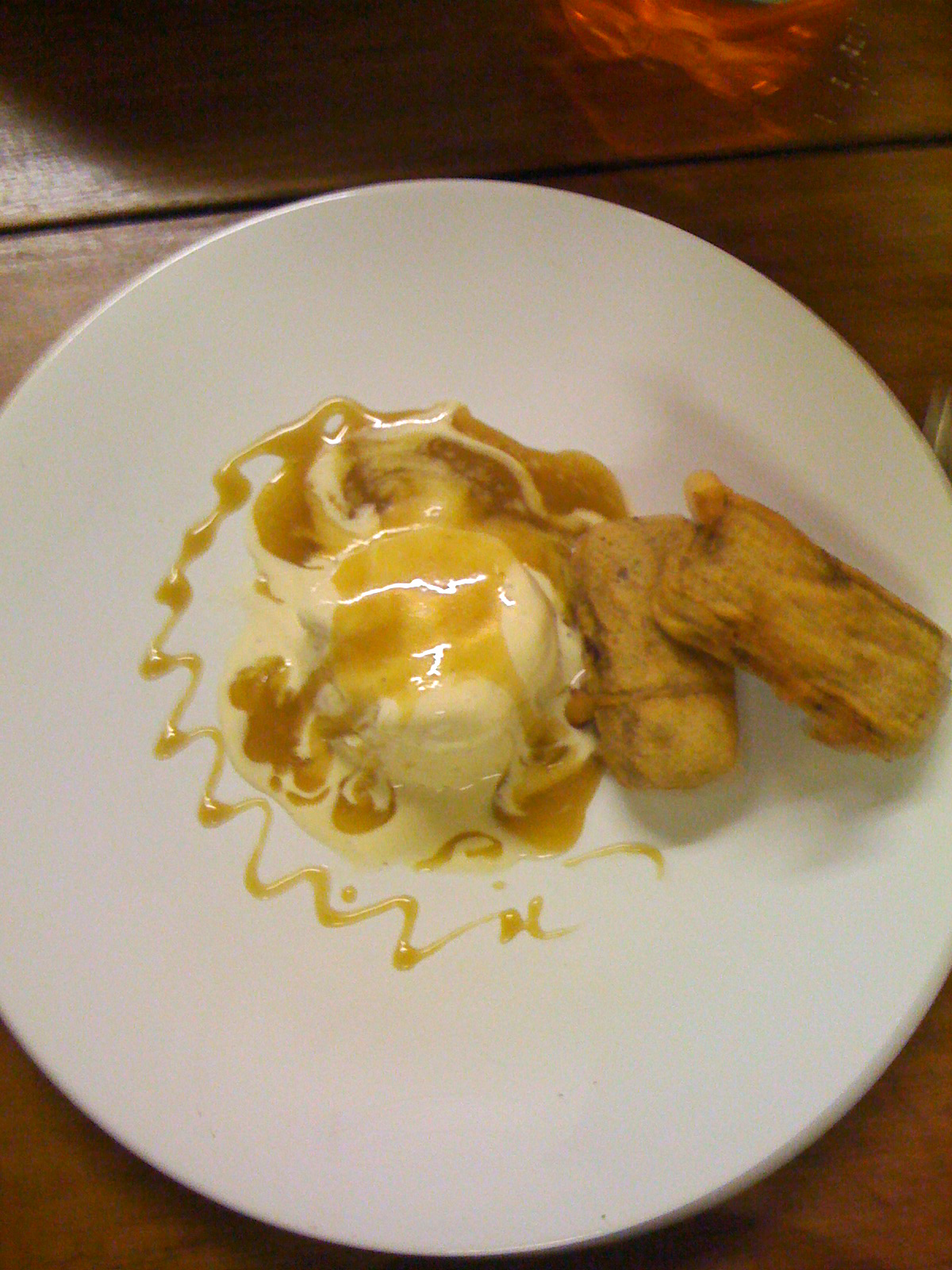
Deep-fried Mars bar and Snickers (medium-sized) with vanilla ice cream and butterscotch sauce

The deep-fried Mars bar caught worldwide attention. In 1998, The Calgary Sun jokingly published an article with: "Welcome to Britain. Official motto: Out of the Frying Pan and Into the Deep Frier."

After the food was mentioned in 2004 by Jay Leno on NBC's Tonight Show in the United States, The Lancet commissioned the University of Dundee to validate the association between Scotland and the deep-fried Mars bar. It undertook a telephone questionnaire survey of 627 fish and chip shops in Scotland, 62% of which responded, and found:

- 66 shops (22% of those responding) sold them; three-quarters of those had only been selling them for the past 3 years.
- An additional 17% had sold them in the past.
- Average sales were 23 bars per week, although 10 shops reported selling 50—200 per week.
- The mean price was £0.60 (range £0.30 to £1.50).
- 76% were sold to children.
- 15 shops reported health concerns with the food.
- Many of the shops which did not sell the product refused to do so as it turns the frying oil black.

In 2012, the originating Carron Fish Bar estimated sales of 100–150 deep-fried Mars bars per week, but 70% were sold to visitors who have heard of its reputation.

== Culinary influence ==
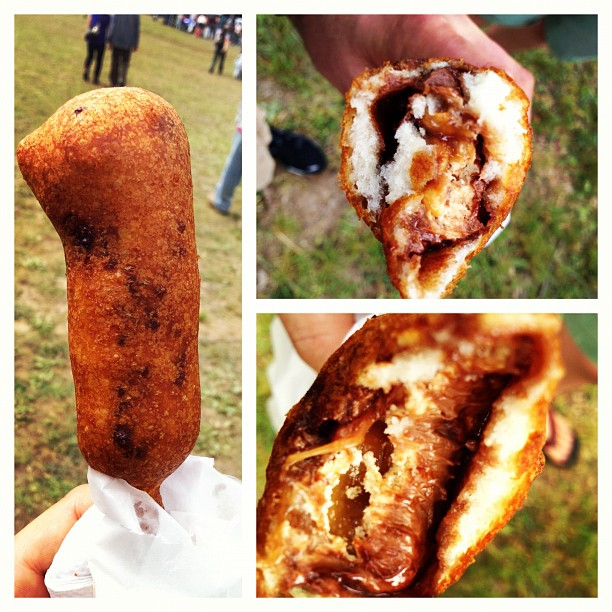
A deep-fried Snickers in the United States, at various stages of consumption

In 2000, Scottish chef Ross Kendall included the bars on the menu of Le Chipper restaurant in Paris.

The deep-fried Mars bar has also given rise to the frying of other confections, for example, Reiver's Fish Bar in Duns annually advertises an Easter special of deep-fried Creme Egg. Deep-fried Snickers have also been reported; it is popular at state fairs and similar events. In her 1999 book and television series Nigella Bites, Nigella Lawson includes a recipe for a deep-fried Bounty bar.

== Symbol of an unhealthy diet ==
Since the Daily Record described it as "Scotland's craziest takeaway" in August 1995, the deep-fried Mars bar has become a symbol for ill health, obesity and high-fat diets. The original article was quickly followed up by other UK publications, with the food portrayed to speak eloquently about Scotland's and the wider UK's poor diet, and resultant levels of obesity.

In 2012, the Haven sought an application for the protected geographical indication under the EU's Protected Food Name Scheme. However, Mars wrote to the fish bar asking it to make plain that deep-frying of the bars was "not authorised or endorsed" by Mars, and an agreed disclaimer statement was put up in both the shop and in its menu.

In a 2012 interview, the Glasgow restaurateur John Quigley felt that Scotland had been trying to "shake off" its unhealthy image since the media coverage of the deep-fried Mars bar.

== See also ==
- Baked Alaska – Dessert of cake, ice cream and meringue
- List of deep fried foods
- Deep fried pizza – Style of pizza preparation
- Deep-fried Twinkie – American snack cake
- Fried ice cream – Coated, deep-fried dessert
