= Crème brûlée =

Custard dessert with hard caramel top

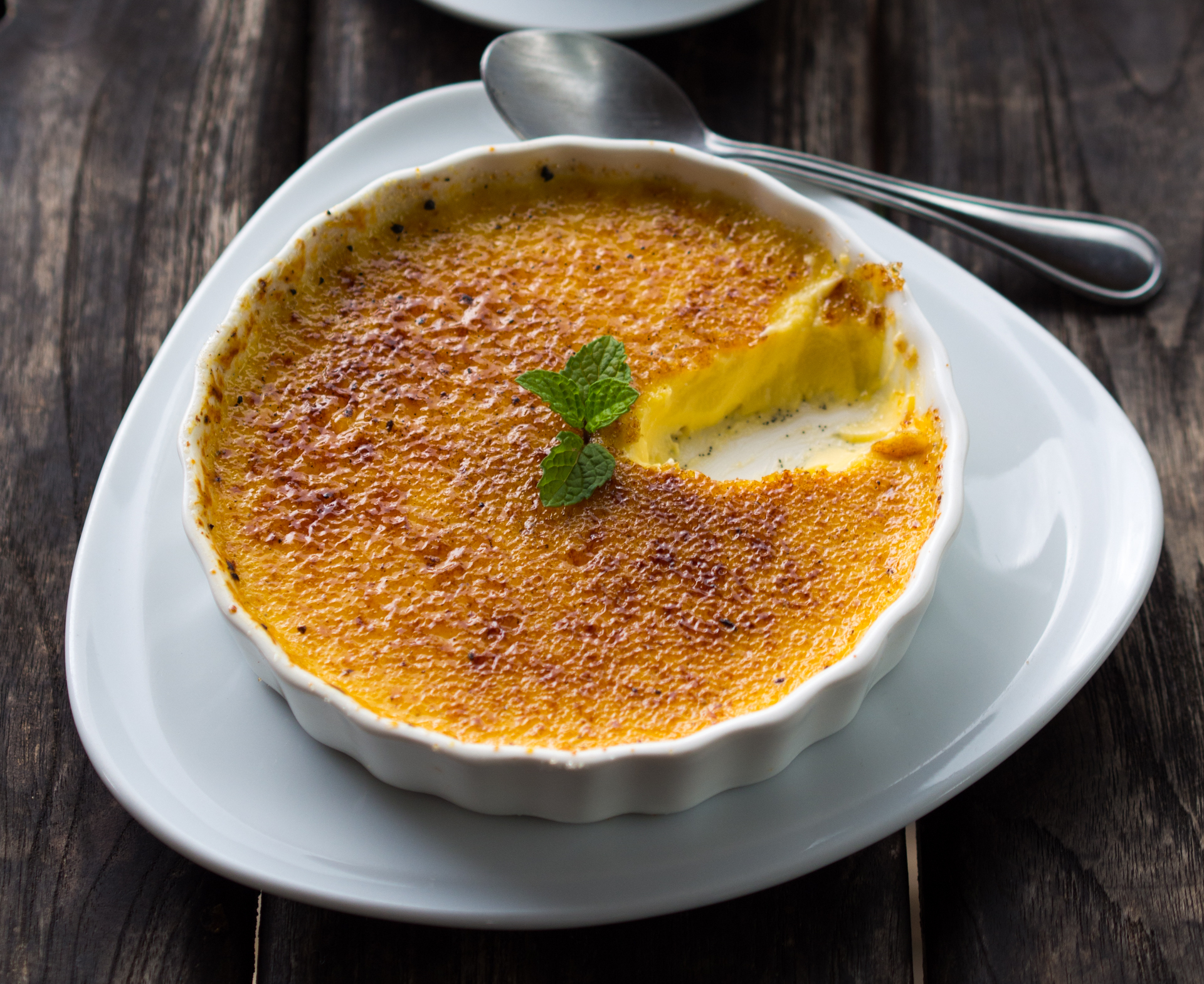
- Alternative names: Burned cream, Burnt cream, Trinity cream, Cambridge burnt cream
- Course: Dessert
- Place of origin: France, Catalonia, or England (Note: Origin is contested. The 1662 recipe from Spain describes a browned cream with caramelised sugar on top. In 1691, French chef François Massialot described it as "crème brulée", but it is unknown where the recipe Massialot wrote originated. Later on, the 1740 recipe refers to it as "crême à l'Angloise", meaning "English cream".)
- Serving temperature: Room temperature
- Main ingredients: Cream, sugar, egg or egg yolks, vanilla

Breaking French crème brûlée's hard top layer by spoon

Crème brûlée (/ˌkrɛm bruːˈleɪ/; French: [kʁɛm bʁy.le]), also known as burnt cream, Cambridge burnt cream, or Trinity cream, and virtually identical to crema catalana, is a dessert consisting of a rich custard base topped with a layer of hardened caramelized sugar. It is normally served slightly chilled; the heat from the caramelizing process tends to warm the top of the custard, while leaving the center cool. The custard base is generally flavored with vanilla in French cuisine, but can have other flavorings. It is sometimes garnished with fruit.

== History ==
The earliest known recipe of a dessert called crème brûlée appears in François Massialot's 1691 cookbook Cuisinier royal et bourgeois, but its ultimate origins are unclear.

The recipe is based on egg yolks and milk, with a pinch of flour. Once cooked, François Massialot specifies "that it must be sweetened on top, in addition to the sugar that is put in it: we take the shovel from the fire, very red at the same time we burn the cream, so that it takes a beautiful color of gold".

Some authors mention Bartolomeo Stefani's Latte alla Spagnuola (1662) as describing crema catalana, but it calls for browning the top of the custard before serving with sugar on top.

The practice of browning dishes with a hot iron was already documented in La Varenne's Cuisinier françois, published in 1651. La Varenne applies the process to his Oeufs au laict [sic] 'eggs with milk', Oeufs à la crème 'eggs with cream', as well as non-custard dishes such as oeufs au miroir de cresme 'fried eggs in cream', ramequin de fromage 'cheese toast', and ramequin de roignon 'kidney ramequin'. But none of these had a layer of hard caramel on top.

The name "burnt cream" was later used to refer to the dish in the 1702 English translation of Massialot's Cuisinier royal et bourgeois. In 1740, he referred to a similar recipe as crême à l'Angloise, or 'English cream', which further cast doubt on its origins. The dessert was introduced at Trinity College, Cambridge, in 1879 as "Trinity Cream" or "Cambridge burnt cream", with the college arms "impressed on top of the cream with a branding iron".

Crème brûlée was generally uncommon in both French and English cookbooks of the nineteenth and twentieth centuries. It became extremely popular in the 1980s, "a symbol of that decade's self-indulgence and the darling of the restaurant boom", probably popularised by Sirio Maccioni at his New York restaurant Le Cirque. He claimed to have made it "the most famous and by far the most popular dessert in restaurants from Paris to Peoria". It also spread from France to other parts in Asia.

== Technique ==
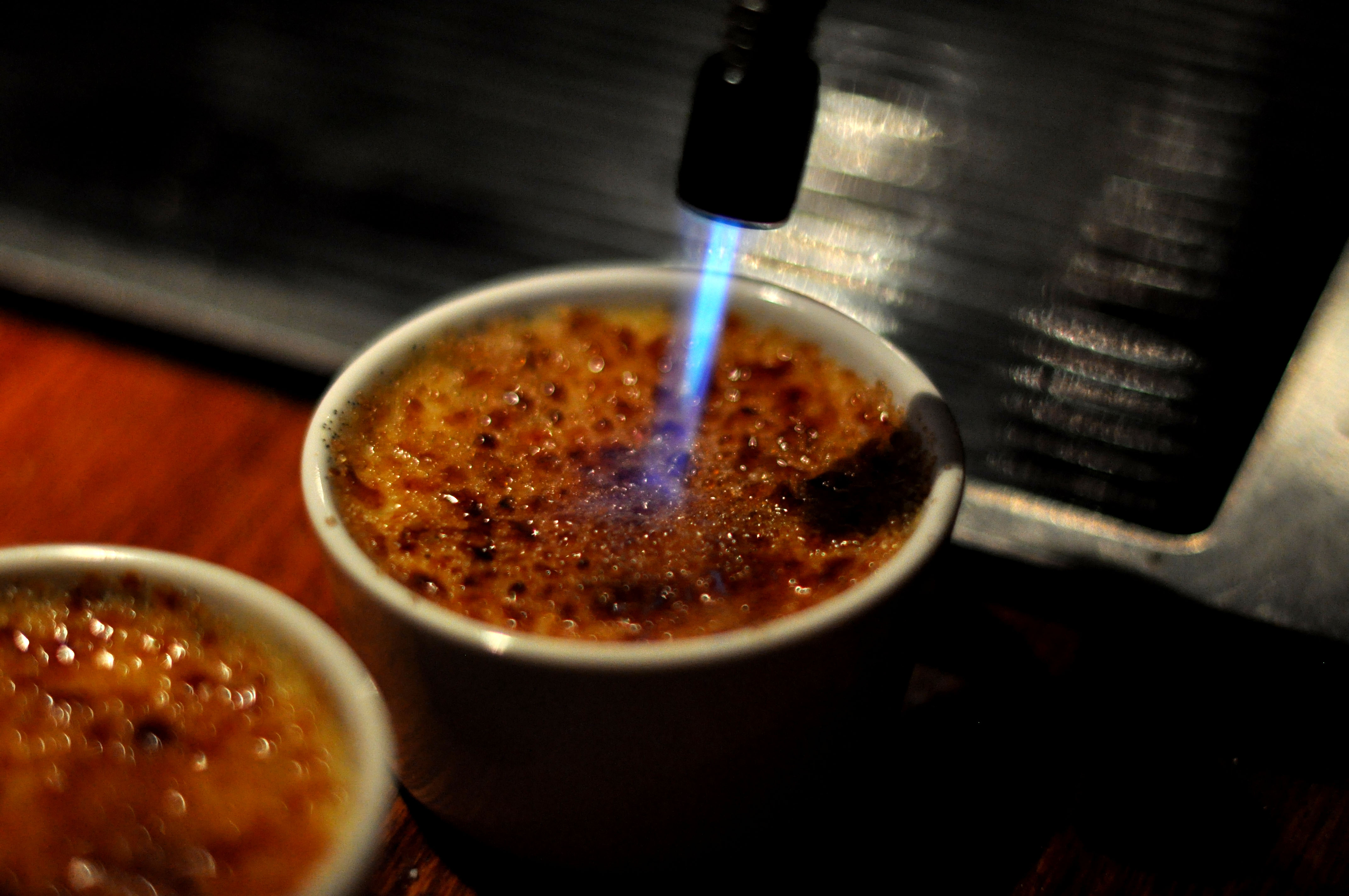
The sugar being caramelized with a blowtorch

Crème brûlée is usually served in individual ramekins. Discs of caramel may be prepared separately and put on top just before serving, or the caramel may be formed directly on top of the custard immediately before serving. To do this, sugar is sprinkled onto the custard, then caramelized under a red-hot salamander (a cast-iron disk with a long wooden handle) or with a torch.

There are two methods for making the custard. The more common creates a "hot" custard by whisking egg yolks in a double boiler with sugar and incorporating the cream, adding vanilla once the custard is removed from the heat. Alternatively, the egg yolk/sugar mixture can be tempered with hot cream, then adding vanilla at the end. In the "cold" method, the egg yolks and sugar are whisked together until the mixture reaches the ribbon stage. Then, cold heavy cream is whisked into the yolk mixture, followed by the vanilla. It is then poured into ramekins and baked in a bain-marie.

== See also ==
- Crème caramel, also known as flan (not to be confused with the English flan)
- List of custard desserts
- List of French desserts
- List of British desserts
- List of Spanish desserts

== General and cited references ==
- "Origin of Crème Brûlée". Petits Propos Culinaires. 31 (61). March 1989.
