= Yemas de Santa Teresa =

Spanish sweet

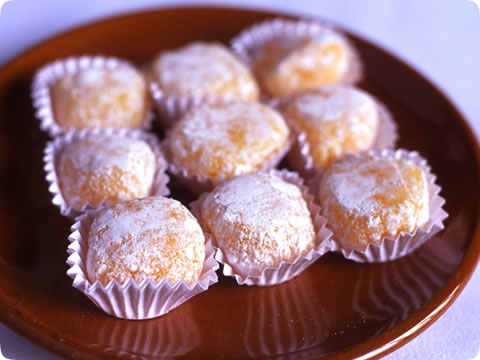
- Type: Pastry
- Place of origin: Spain
- Region or state: Ávila
- Main ingredients: Egg yolks, syrup, lemon juice, cinnamon

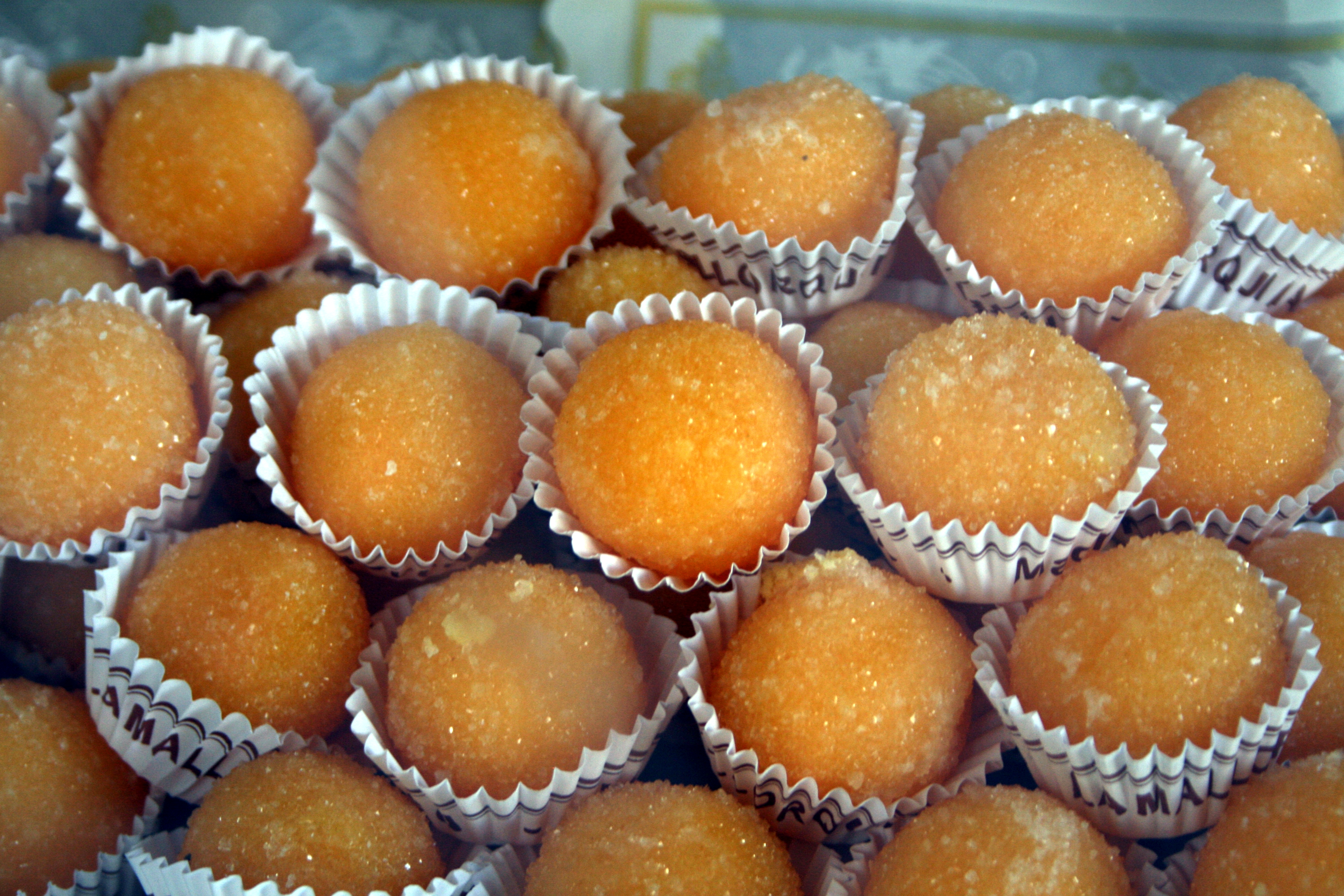
Yemas de Santa Teresa in the typical tartlet papers

Yemas de Santa Teresa (Yolks of Saint Teresa) or Yemas de Ávila (Yolks of Ávila) are a pastry that is identified with the Spanish province of Ávila. They are popular for their distinctive look: small orange balls served in a white confectionery paper and are made to honor Teresa of Ávila.

== History ==
The origin of the pastry is uncertain but there are several opinions where it comes from. One theory assumes that it was a pastry shop in the Middle Ages in Andalusia called "Flor de Castilla" that first sold a pastry under the name "Yemas de Santa Teresa". Don Isabelo Sánchez, founder of the pastry shop "La Dulce Aviles" (today known as "Flor de Castilla") in Ávila commercialized the pastry in 1860 under the name "Yemas de Santa Teresa". The success of the dish was great and other pastry chefs in Ávila soon started to sell similar pastries which they called "Yemas de Ávila". Another theory credits the monks of the convent of Teresa of Ávila with the invention of the dish.

With the beginning of the 21st century the market for "Yemas de Ávila" expanded and they are now on demand in North America. Therefore, a new packaging system was developed to improve the preservation and make them survive the shipping to America.

== Characteristics ==
This pastry is made exclusively with egg yolks which are stirred in copper bowls. Meanwhile, syrup is cooked with lemon juice and cinnamon to reduce it until it is a dense mixture. The consistency can be proven by dipping a spoon into the syrup and is right when the sticky liquid keeps connected with the spoon by a thin thread.

As soon as the syrup reduction is gooey enough it is mixed with the egg yolks and stirred with them at a low heat. The pastry dough is left to cool and is then moulded into the special kind of balls with a few centimetres diameter and put into the tartlet papers.

== See also ==
- List of Spanish desserts
- Yema, a sweet of the Philippines
