= Fried milk =

Deep-fried Cantonese dessert

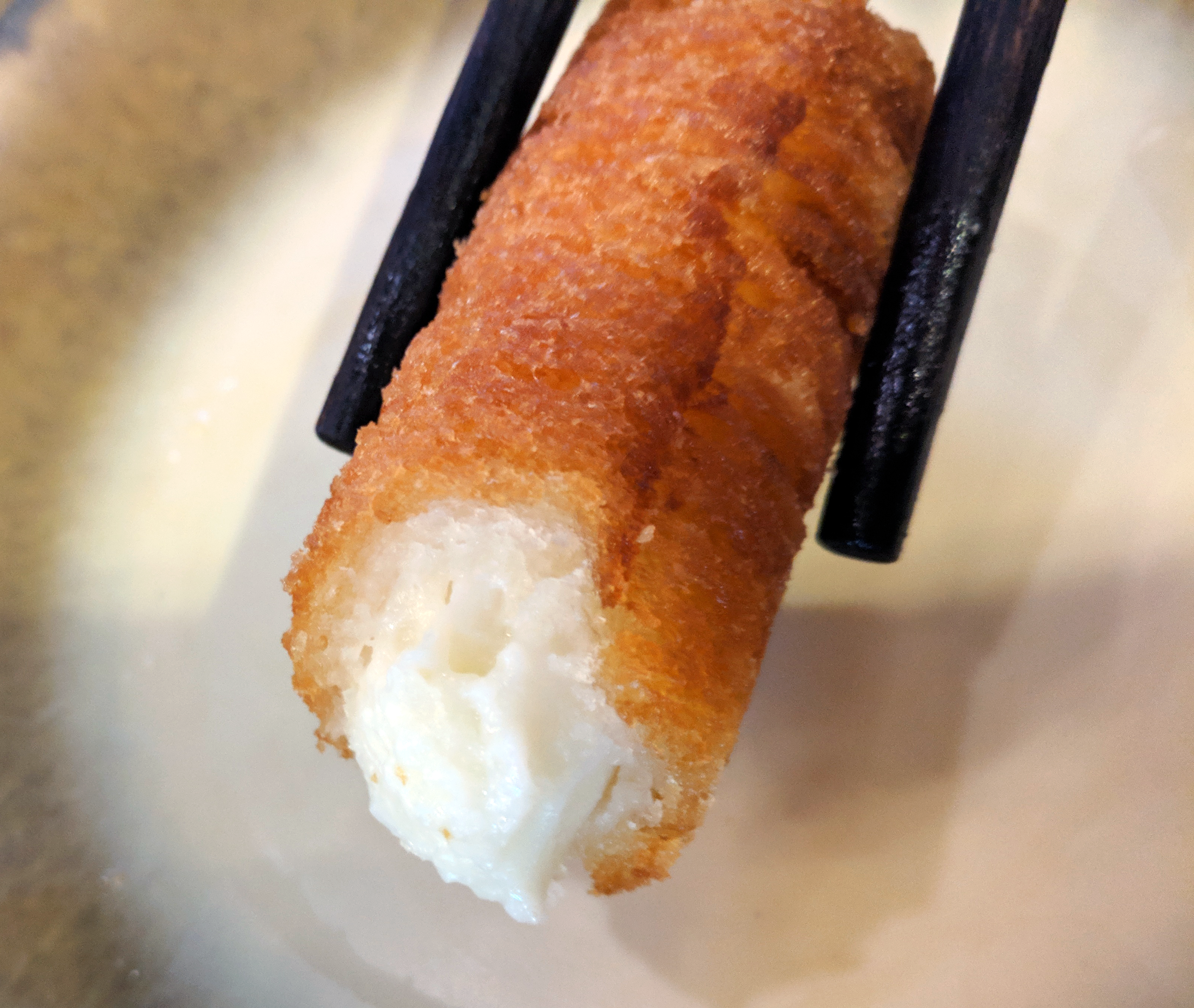
- Type: Dessert
- Place of origin: Daliang, Shunde
- Region or state: Guangdong
- Invented: 1970s
- Main ingredients: Cow milk or buffalo milk, sugar, flour, cornstarch, egg, oil

Fried milk (simplified Chinese: 炸鲜奶; traditional Chinese: 炸鮮奶; pinyin: zhà xiān nǎi), also known as "Daliang fried fresh milk" and "crispy milk curd", is a dessert from Cantonese cuisine, which originated in the Shunde District of Guangdong, China. Fried milk is deep-fried, with a golden crispy outer skin and a soft white texture on the inside, and a milky flavor. It is similar to the Spanish dessert leche frita. The ingredients of leche frita are similar to those of fried milk, but it is additionally flavored with cinnamon sugar or lemon peel.

== Production ==
Cow or buffalo milk is combined with flour, cornstarch, and sugar and thoroughly mixed. The milk mixture is cooked over low heat, and stirred constantly until thickened and sticky. The mixture is then poured into a container and refrigerated until it solidifies. Once firm, the mixture is cut out into rectangular pieces and coated in a batter typically made from cornstarch, water, and eggs. The pieces are then deep fried in hot oil until golden brown.

== Origin ==
Shunde's milk-based dishes are highly renowned. In one of its areas, Daliang, the fertile land supports the raising of buffaloes that produce high-quality milk. The taste of fried milk made with local buffalo milk, instead of cow, is noticeably different. Buffalo milk contains almost double the fat of other milks, such as goat milk and cow milk, and is relatively high in protein, making it more nutritious.

Fried milk was developed in the mid to late 1970s by a chef named He Dingwen, borrowing from the style of water chestnut cake. He Dingwen created numerous buffalo milk-based dishes, including types of biscuits and egg tarts.

== Contemporary versions ==
The creation of fried milk became so popular that buffalo milk dishes and similar delicacies appeared in the Shunde region. The "ginger crispy milk roll", which was also created by He Dingwen, is described as having a unique gingery flavor, and won the rank of "Gold Award of Lingnan Special Dish".

Many versions of fried milk have been created, such as fried milk dipped in sliced almonds, adding a nutty flavor. Another version uses breadcrumbs instead of batter to cover the outside of the thickened milk rectangles, giving the dish a crunchier texture.

In 2020, the art of making fried milk was included on the eighth intangible cultural heritage list of Shunde District.

== See also ==
- Fried ice cream
