= Casadiella =

Typical dessert from Asturias

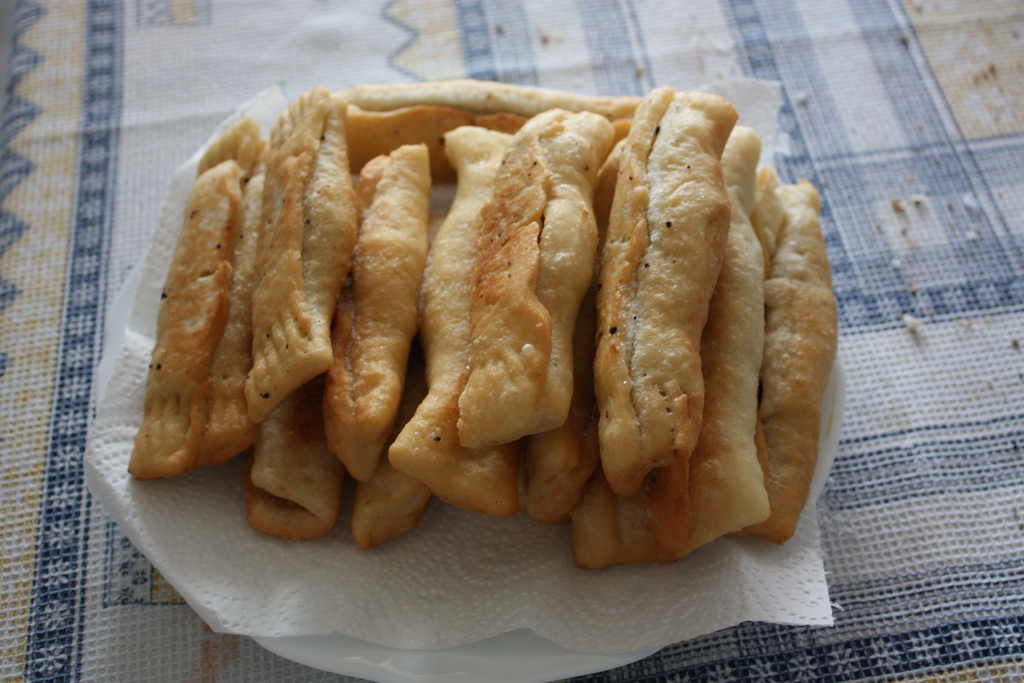
Final result

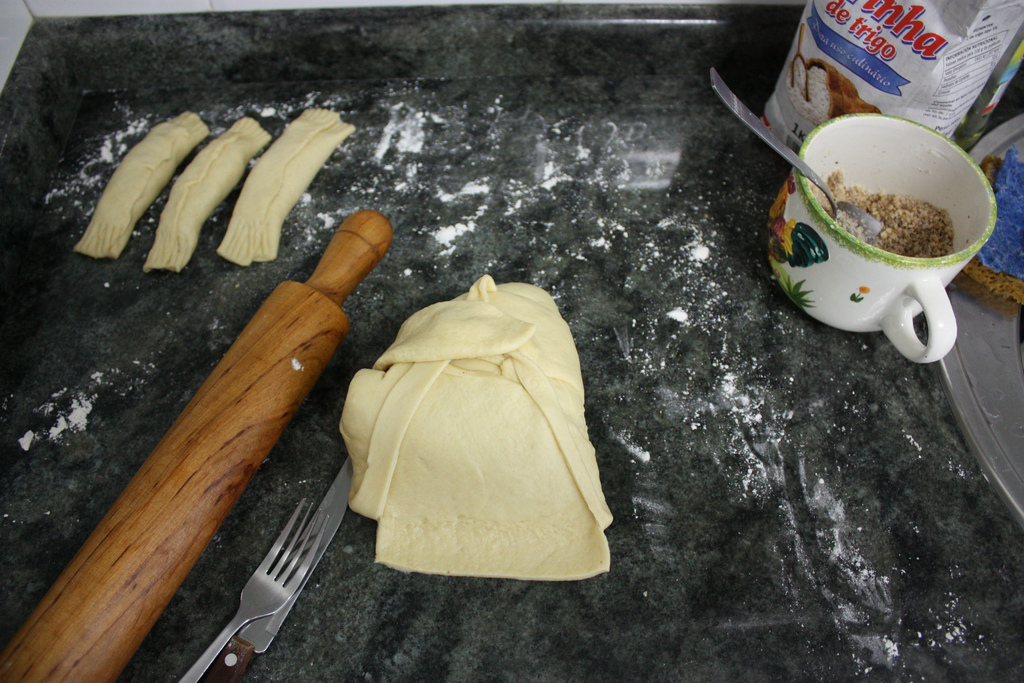
Dough preparation

The Casadiella is a typical dessert from Asturias. It consists of a pastry made of wheat flour, flavored with Anis de la Asturiana (Anise liquor) or wine, and filled with toasted hazelnuts or walnuts and sugar. They are mixed and they are fried together. The final shape is a tube approximately ten centimeters long with ends that are closed with a fork.
