= Fartons =

Spanish confectionery sweets

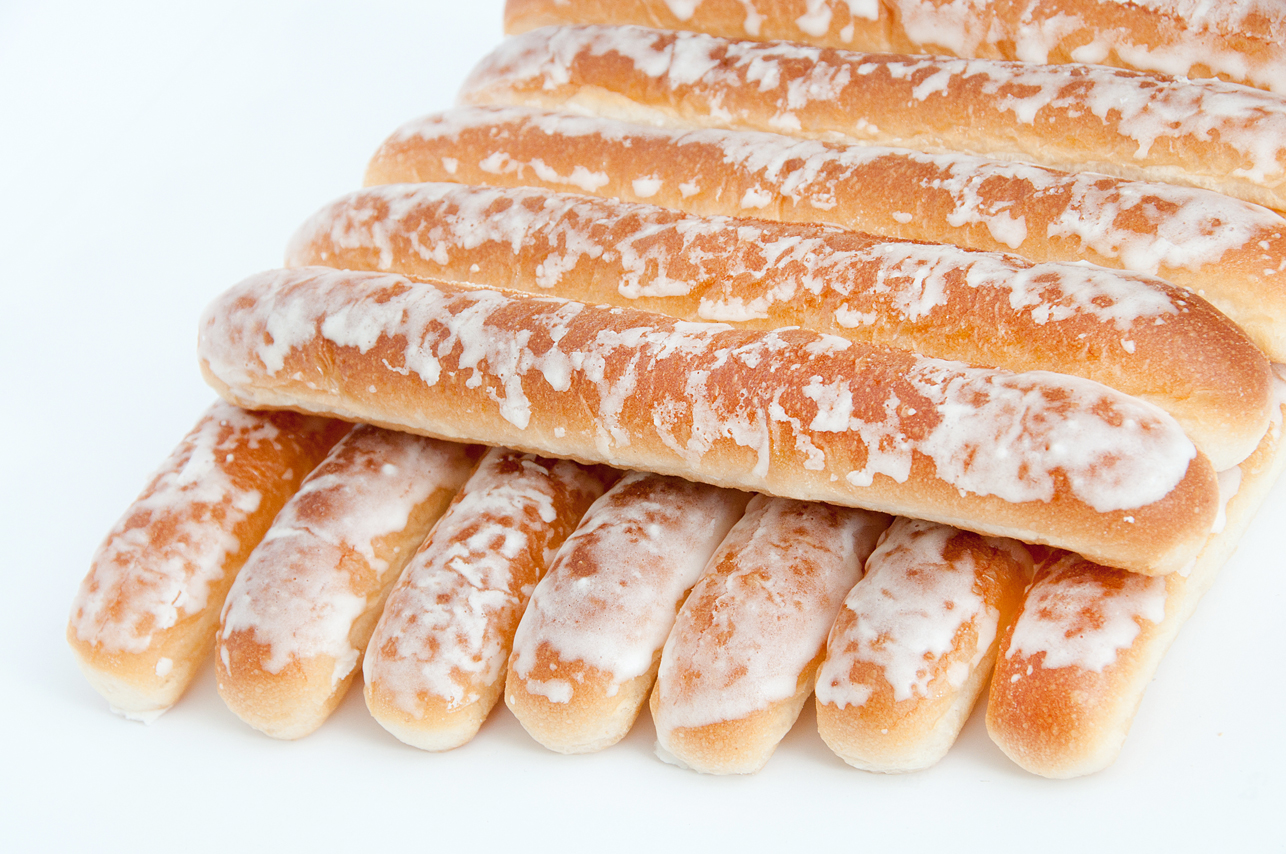
- Fartons Polo
- Place of origin: Spain
- Region or state: Valencia
- Main ingredients: Flour, milk, sugar, oil, eggs and a leavening agent

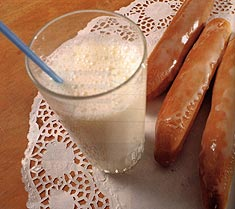
Fartons with horchata

Fartons (Valencian: [faɾˈtons], in singular: fartó [faɾˈto]; Spanish: fartón [faɾˈton]) are confectionery sweets typical of the Valencian town of Alboraia, Spain. Elongated and glazed with sugar, they are made of flour, milk, sugar, oil, eggs, and a leavening agent.

This delicate and spongy sweet is made for dipping in orxata or horchata, a drink made of tiger nuts that is served cold. Fartóns are also eaten with hot beverages such as hot chocolate or caffè latte.

== Origin ==
According to an apocryphal legend, James I of Aragon called the drink orxata "pure gold" because of its texture and sweetness. In the 1960s, the Polo family developed an oblong pastry that was sweet and delicate. It had a spongy texture that was perfect to soak up orxata. Because of its long shape, fartóns could also reach the bottom of a glass. This was the beginning of Fartóns Polo.

== Variations ==
In the 1990s, the hospitality industry began to serve frozen pastries and with it a new variation of fartóns, the so-called flaky fartóns. Flaky fartóns are made with a different dough, resulting in a different texture. Other variations include spongy fartóns, made from wheat flour, sugar, sunflower oil, water, eggs, fresh yeast, bread supplements, and salt. A commercial variety of flaky fartóns are made with animal fat and have a denser consistency.

== Nutritional information ==
Spongy fartóns do not contain preservatives or artificial coloring. The nutritional facts for 100g of spongy fartóns are: calories: 372.6kcal/1559.1 kJ, protein: 9g, carbohydrates: 58.8g, and fat: 11.3g.

The nutritional facts for flaky fartóns are: calories: 413.3kcal/1729.2kJ, protein: 7.3g, carbohydrates: 51.7g, and fat: 19.7g.
