= Dátiles rellenos =

Stuffed dates from Spanish cuisine

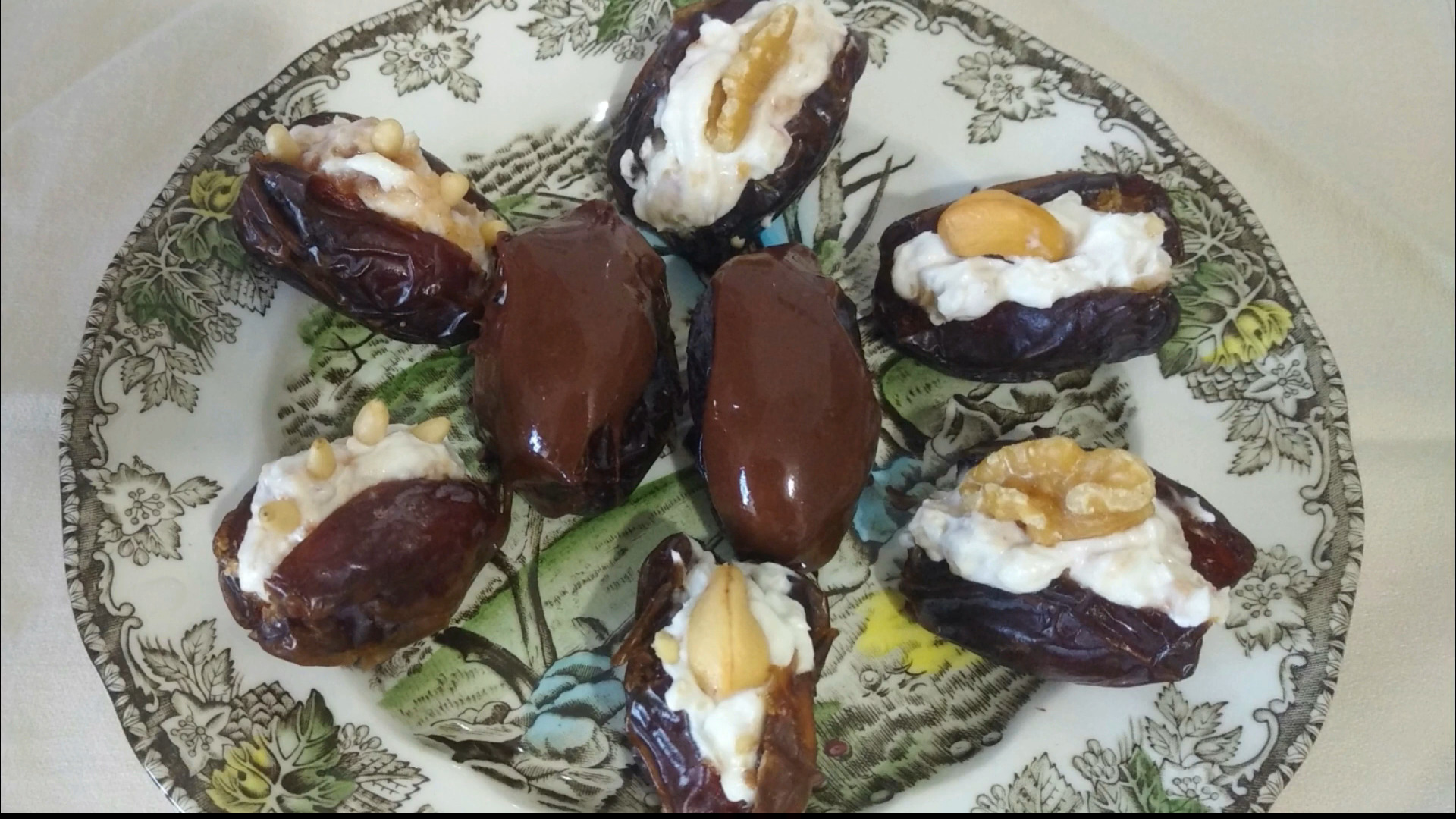
- Dátiles rellenos with soft cheese and nuts
- Alternative names: Stuffed dates
- Course: Tea, coffee
- Place of origin: Spain
- Main ingredients: Dates, marzipan
- Variations: Bacon-wrapped with plantain filling, soft cheese and nuts

Dátiles rellenos are stuffed dates in Spanish cuisine. They can be made with different fillings and are often served as a sweet dish to accompany tea or coffee. Dátiles rellenos de almendras is made by filling dates with marzipan that has been colored and flavored with a little liqueur. The filling can be made with ground almonds, sugar, and flavorings like rose water and almond essence. They can also be made envueltos en tocino, wrapped in bacon, with almond or plaintain filling. Another version is filled with soft cheese such as mascarpone or cream cheese, and topped with whole nuts.
