= Fried ice cream =

Coated, deep-fried dessert

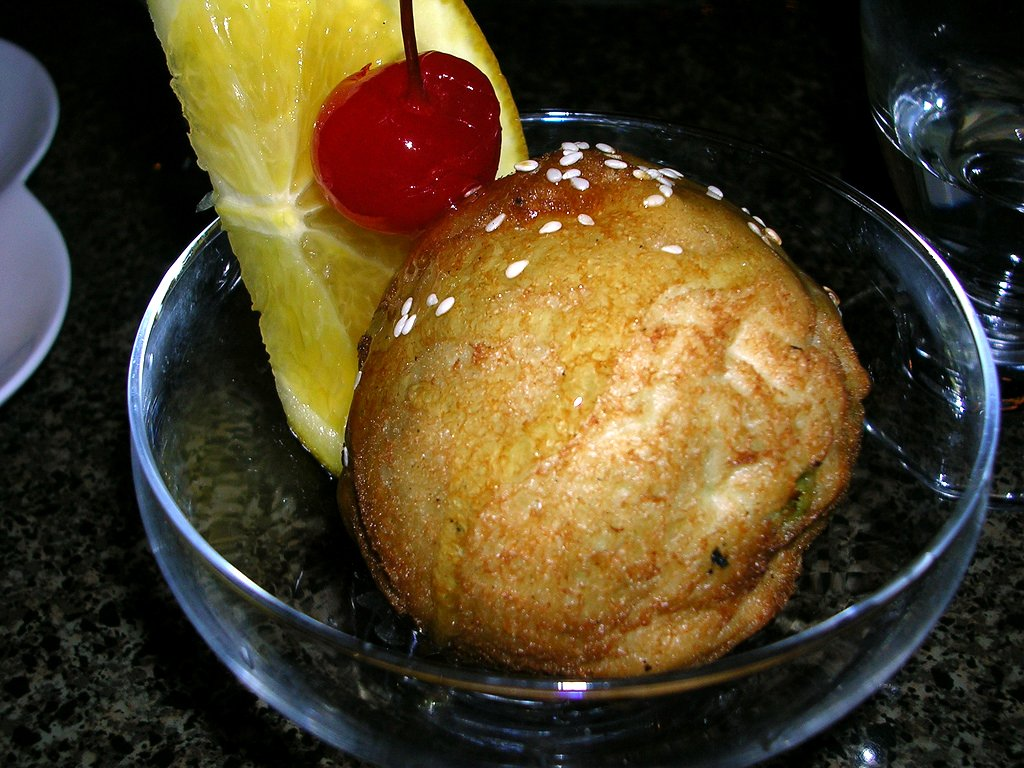
- Fried ice cream is served at many Asian restaurants, particularly Chinese-based ones.
- Type: Pastry
- Course: Dessert
- Serving temperature: Warm
- Main ingredients: Ice cream

Fried ice cream is a dessert made of a scoop of ice cream that is frozen hard, then breaded or coated in a batter before being quickly deep-fried, creating a warm, crispy shell around the still-cold ice cream. It is common in Chinese and Mexican cuisine.

== Origin ==
There are conflicting stories about the dessert's origin. Some claim that it was first served during the 1893 Chicago World's Fair, where the ice cream sundae was also invented. Though in 1894, a Philadelphia company was given credit for its invention describing: "A small, solid [cake] of the ice cream is enveloped in a thin sheet of pie crust and then dipped into boiling lard or butter to cook the outside to a crisp. Served immediately, the ice cream is found to be as solidly frozen as it was first prepared."

It may be derived in part from Baked Alaska, originating earlier in the 19th century, which puts ice cream under a quickly broiled meringue.

== Preparation ==
The dessert is commonly made by taking a scoop of ice cream frozen well below the temperature at which ice cream is generally kept, possibly coating it in raw egg, rolling it in cornflakes or cookie crumbs, and briefly deep frying it. The extremely low temperature of the ice cream prevents it from melting while being fried.

It may be sprinkled with cinnamon and sugar and a touch of peppermint; whipped cream or honey may be used, as well.

== Associations with national cuisines ==
In the United States, fried ice cream has been associated with Asian cuisine, appearing in reviews of Chinese, Japanese, and Polynesian restaurants in the "Dining Out" section of the New York Times in the 1970s.

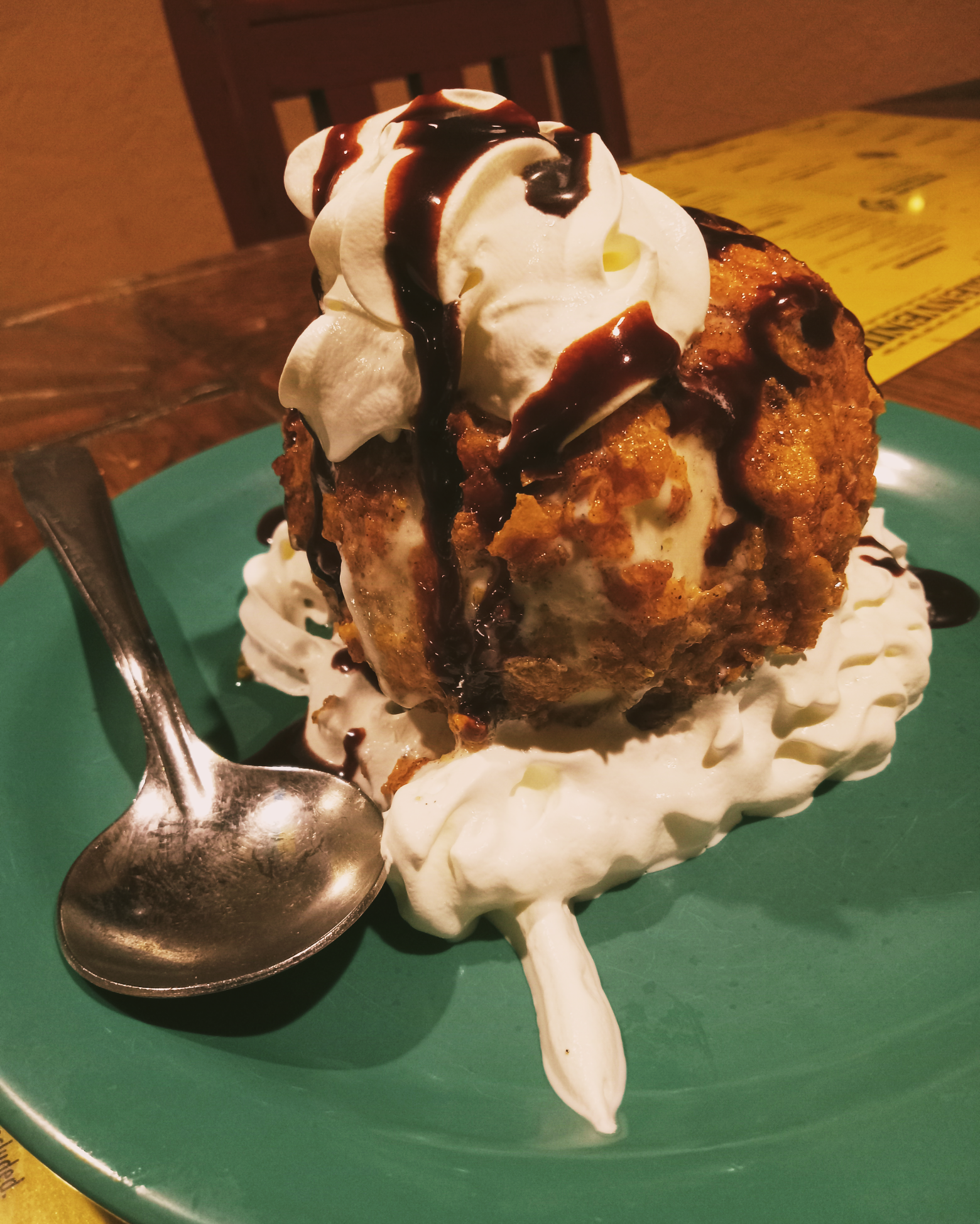
Fried ice cream

It also came to be associated with Mexican cuisine, in large part due to national chain Chi-Chi's adopting a fried ice cream made with tortillas and cinnamon as its "signature dessert" when it opened in 1975.

In Australia, fried ice cream is strongly associated with Asian cuisine and particularly Australian Chinese cuisine. It is frequently served with caramel sauce.

== See also ==
- Baked Alaska
- Deep Fried Mars Bar
- Fried milk
- List of Chinese desserts
- List of desserts
