= François Massialot =

French chef (1660–1733)

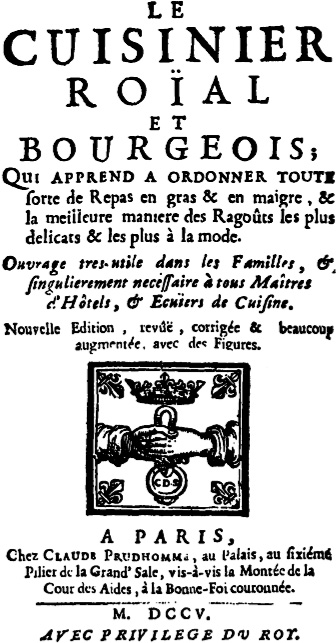
Title page of Le Cuisinier roïal et bourgeois, qui apprend à ordonner toute ſorte de Repas en gras & en maigre, & la meilleure maniere des Ragoûts les plus delicats & les plus à la mode. Ouvrage tres-utile dans les Familles, & ſingulierement neceſſaire à tous Maîtres d'Hôtels, & Ecuiers de Cuiſine. Paris, Claude Prudhomme, 1705.

François Massialot (English: /mæsiæˈloʊ/ mass-ee-ah-LOH, French: [fʁɑ̃swa masjalɔ]; 1660, in Limoges, Limousin – 1733, in Paris) was a French chef who served as chef de cuisine (officier de bouche) to various illustrious personages, including Philippe I, Duke of Orléans, the brother of Louis XIV, and his son Philippe II, Duke of Orléans, who was first duc de Chartres then the Regent, as well as the duc d'Aumont, the Cardinal d’Estrées, and the marquis de Louvois. His Le cuisinier roïal et bourgeois first appeared, anonymously, as a single volume in 1691, and was expanded to two (1712) then three volumes, in the revised edition of 1733–34. (Note: The 1740-42 three-volume Massialot is titled Le nouveau cuisinier royal et bourgeois, ou cuisinier moderne. Qui apprend a ordonner toutes sortes de repas en gras & en maigre, & la meilleure maniere des ragoûts le plus délicats & les plus à la mode; & toutes sortes de pâtisseries: avec de nouveaux desseins de tables….Ouvrage très-utile dans les familles, aux maîtres d’hôtel & officiers de cuisine ("The new chef, royal and bourgeois, or the modern chef. Which teaches the ordonnance of all sorts of meals, rich and lean, & the best fashion of the most delicate and most fashionable ragouts, & all sorts of pastries with new designs for table settings... A most useful Work in families, for stewards & chefs." (Antiquarian Booksellers of America website.).) His lesser cookbook, Nouvelle instruction pour les confitures, les liqueurs et les fruits, (Paris, Charles de Sercy), appeared, also anonymously, in 1692.

Massialot describes himself in his preface as "a cook who dares to qualify himself royal, and it is not without cause, for the meals which he describes...have all been served at court or in the houses of princes, and of people of the first rank." Places where Massialot served banquets included the Château de Sceaux, the Château de Meudon, and Versailles. An innovation in Massialot's book was the alphabetisation of recipes, "a step toward the first culinary dictionary" Barbara Wheaton observes; Wheaton has compared the changes made in the various editions of Massialot: a glass of white wine in a fish stock makes a surprisingly late appearance, in 1703. Meringues make their first appearance under their familiar name in Massialot, who is also credited with crème brûlée, in which the sugar topping was melted and burnt with a red-hot fire shovel.

Massialot's works, translated into English as The Court and Country Cook (1702) and often reprinted, were used by professional chefs until the middle of the 18th century.
