= Cantabrian cream cheese =

Cheese made from the milk of Friesian cows in Cantabria, Spain

Cantabrian cream cheese (Spanish: Queso de nata de Cantabria) is made from the milk of Friesian cows in Cantabria, an autonomous community in northern Spain. The cheese has a Protected Designation of Origin since 1985. The production of the cheese is confined to all parts of Cantabria, except the areas of Tresviso and Menor de Bejes in the western part of the region. It is presented in forms of various weights from 400 – 2,800 g (14 ounces – 6 lbs). The size of the forms varies according to the weight.

== Manufacture ==
The milk is coagulated with an animal enzyme, preferably from suckling calves of the “Pintas de Cantabria” breed, or with any other enzyme permitted by the regulating council. The curdling process is carried out when the milk is 30°C (86°F) and continues for 40 minutes. The curd is then cut to grains of 5mm (0.20 inches) diameter and then they are heated to 34°C (93°F). It is then placed in moulds, the size of which vary according to the weight of the finished form. The moulds are pressed for up to 24 hours and then they are salted by immersion in a brine bath for a maximum of 24 hours. The curing of this cheese takes a minimum of 7 days from the time it comes out of the brine bath. While the cheese is maturing the forms are turned over regularly and the rinds rubbed clean.

== Flavour ==
Flavour and taste are described as characteristic, buttery with a slight acidity.

== Texture ==
Firm but creamy, there are no cavities and the colour is cream to yellow. There are no cavities in the body of the cheese.

== Rind ==
Creamy/beige in colour, thin and smooth.

== Uses ==
Being a soft cheese it is utilitarian. It may be used in cooking a variety of dishes or made be eaten in slices with bread, biscuits, nuts etc.

== See also ==
- List of cheeses
