= Leche frita =

Traditional Spanish dessert, Spanish sweet typical of northern Spain

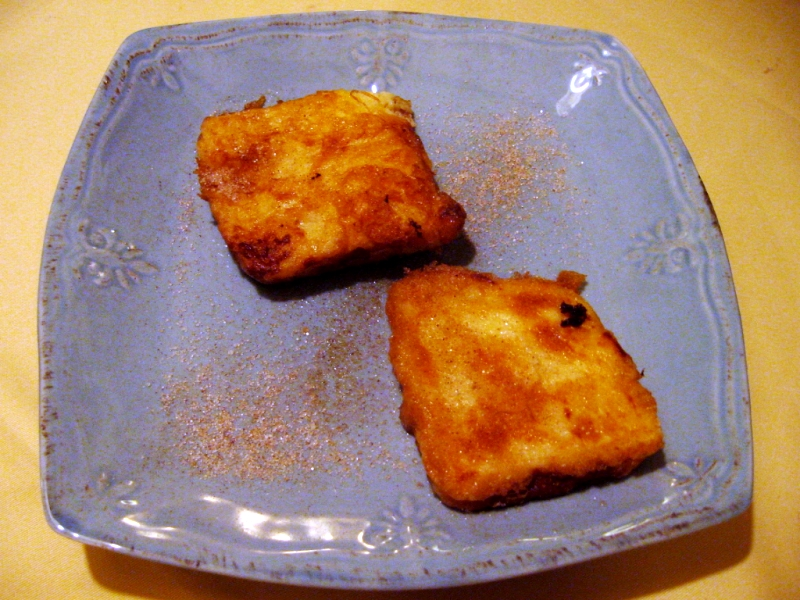
- Place of origin: Spain
- Main ingredients: Flour, milk, sugar, cinnamon
- Food energy (per serving): 452 kcal (1,890 kJ)

Leche frita (literally fried milk) is a Spanish sweet typical of northern Spain. It is made by cooking flour with milk and sugar until it thickens to a firm dough which is then portioned, fried and served with a sugar glaze and cinnamon powder.

== History ==
Though various regions claim to have invented the dish the recipe's origin is uncertain, but commonly it is considered to have originated in the province of Palencia from where it spread throughout the country.

== Preparation ==
As the sweet used to be homemade there exist many variations on the recipe on how to prepare and present the leche frita. All of them have in common that they simmer the milk with sugar, cinnamon sticks and sometimes lemon zest. In a bowl, flour, sugar and egg yolks are mixed and the sugar milk is poured in. The mixture is stirred until everything is well combined. This concoction is then cooked at medium heat until it thickens. The generated dough can now be moulded into round, rectangular or rhombical shapes, rolled in stirred eggs, covered with flour and then fried. Before they are served they are glazed with sugar and sprinkled with cinnamon.

== See also ==
- Gulab jamun
- Fried milk
- Fried ice cream
- Bread pudding
