= Golmajería =

Type of Spanish pastries

Golmajería or golmajía refers to pastries from La Rioja, Spain. The etymology of the word is uncertain, but it may have Arabic origins.

The best-known examples of golmajería include the fardelejos of Arnedo, the Mazapán de Soto of Soto en Cameros, the rolls and manguitos of Cervera del Río Alhama, the camuesada or sosiega of Comarca de Cervera de Río Alhama, the ahorcaditos and molletes of Santo Domingo de la Calzada, the bodigo or harinosa of Aguilar del Río Alhama, and the barrilla of Calahorra.

== See also ==
- List of pastries
