= Sobao =

Spanish delicacy

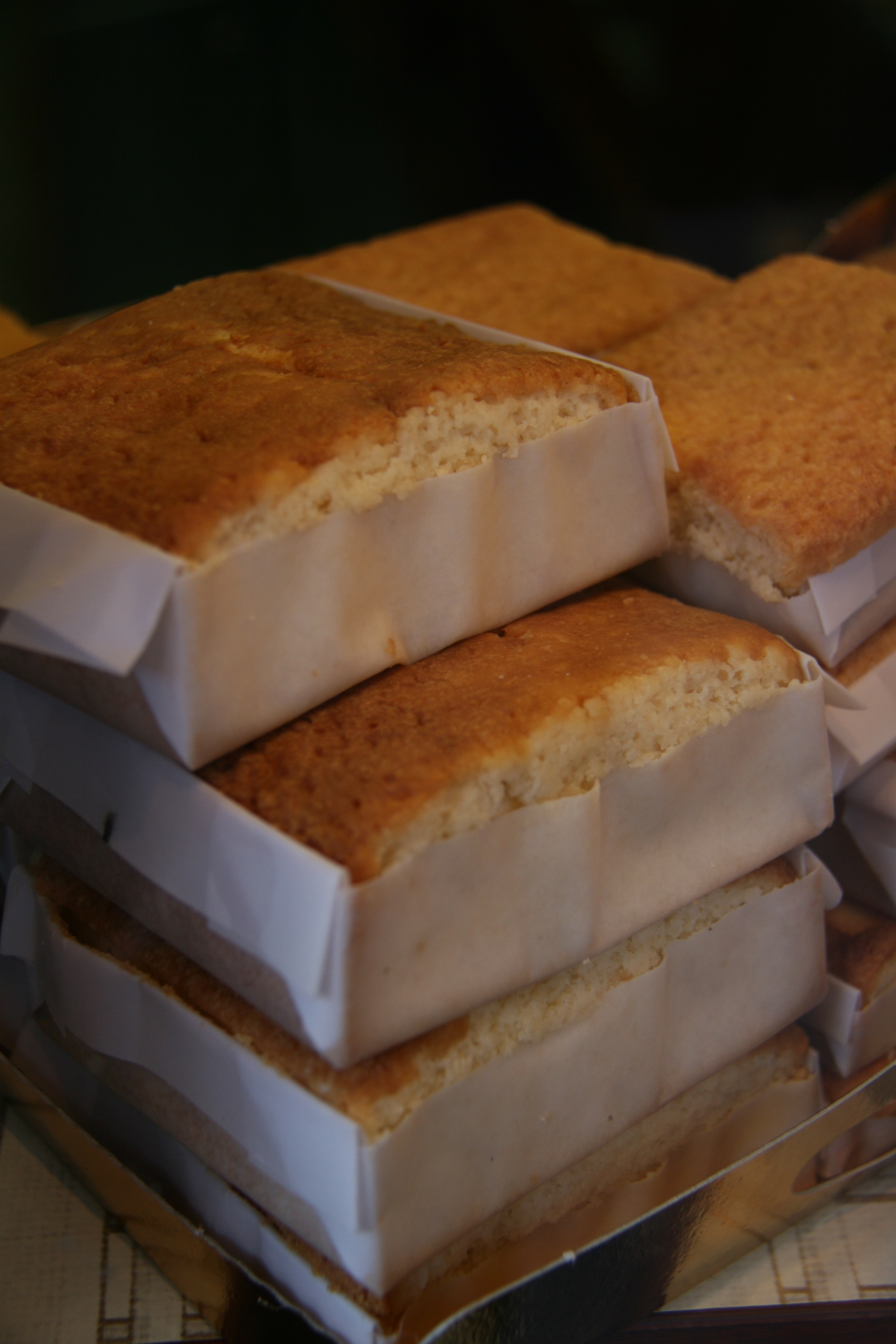
- Alternative names: Sobao pasiego
- Place of origin: Spain
- Region or state: Valles Pasiegos
- Main ingredients: Sugar, butter, flour, eggs, salt, lemon zest, rum or anise liquor, dry yeast

Sobao or sobao pasiego or sobau or sobau pasiegu is a Cantabria and Spanish delicacy typical of the Valles Pasiegos and one of the key signature delicacies of Cantabria. The sobao pasiego possesses Geographical indication since 2004.

In the earliest recipes, the ingredients were bread dough, white sugar and butter with eggs. The modern sobao was developed in 1896, when a cook named Eusebia Hernández Martín replaced the bread dough with flour.

== See also ==
- Cantabrian cuisine
