= Ribe (disambiguation) =

Ribe is the oldest town of Denmark.

Ribe may also refer to:

== Places ==
=== Denmark ===
- Ancient Diocese of Ribe, a former Roman Catholic Diocese in Denmark
- Diocese of Ribe, a diocese in the Church of Denmark
- Ribe Cathedral, a Roman Catholic church in the town of Ribe
- Ribe Katedralskole, a very old cathedral school in the town of Ribe
- Ribe County, former county in Denmark which was abolished in 2007
- Ribe Municipality, a former municipality in Denmark, now part of Esbjerg Municipality
- Ribe Kunstmuseum, an art museum in the town of Ribe

=== Norway ===
- Ribe, Norway, a village in Lillesand municipality in Aust-Agder county

=== Other ===
- Ribe (crater), an impact crater on Mars, named after the Danish city of Ribe

== People ==
- Ribe (ethnic group), a Kenyan tribe that is part of the Mijikenda peoples
- Àngels Ribé (born 1943), a Catalan conceptual artist of the 1970s
- Montse Ribé (born 1972), a Spanish make-up artist and actress
- Peter Ribe (born 1966), a Norwegian sprint canoer

== Other uses ==
- Treaty of Ribe, a proclamation at Ribe made by King Christian I of Denmark
- Radiation-induced bystander effect, phenomenon in which unirradiated cells exhibit irradiated effects
- Richard Bergner Holding GmbH & Co. KG (RIBE), German manufacturer of fastening systems, technical springs, and electrical fittings
  - RIBE CV mechanical fastener, Polydrive fastener used in automotive products

== See also ==
- Ribes (disambiguation)
