= Annemette Kure Andersen =

Danish poet and literary editor

Annemette Kure Andersen (born 1962) is a Danish poet and literary editor. Her poetry has been translated into several languages including English.

== Biography ==
Born in Ribe, Andersen matriculated from Ribe Cathedral School in 1981. She went on to study Italian literature at Aarhus University and Siena University, graduating in Italian poetry in 1990. She worked as a critic and translator, and was a freelance publisher's reader. In 1996, she became editor of Hvedekorn, an important Danish literary journal.

After her debut with Dicentra Spectabilis in 1991, she translated poems by Giuseppe Ungaretti into Danish. Her own symbolist poetry is suggestive, evoking nature and hardly imperceptible mood changes in human relationships. Some of her poetry have been translated into English by the American poet Thom Satterlee (born 1967).

== Works ==
Annemette Kure Andersen's works include:

- Dicentra Spectabilis (poems), Borgen (1991)
- Espalier (poems), Borgen (1993)
- Tidehverv (poems), Borgen (1996)
- Epifanier (poems), Borgen (1997)
- Fraktur (poems), Borgen (2000)
- Dokument (poems), Borgen (2001)
- Små Afvigelser (short stories), Borgen (2003)
- Vandskel (poems), Borgen (2005)
- Andetsteds (poems), Borgen (2007)
- Stedfæstelse (poems), Lindhardt & Ringhof 2012
