= Ribe =

- Town
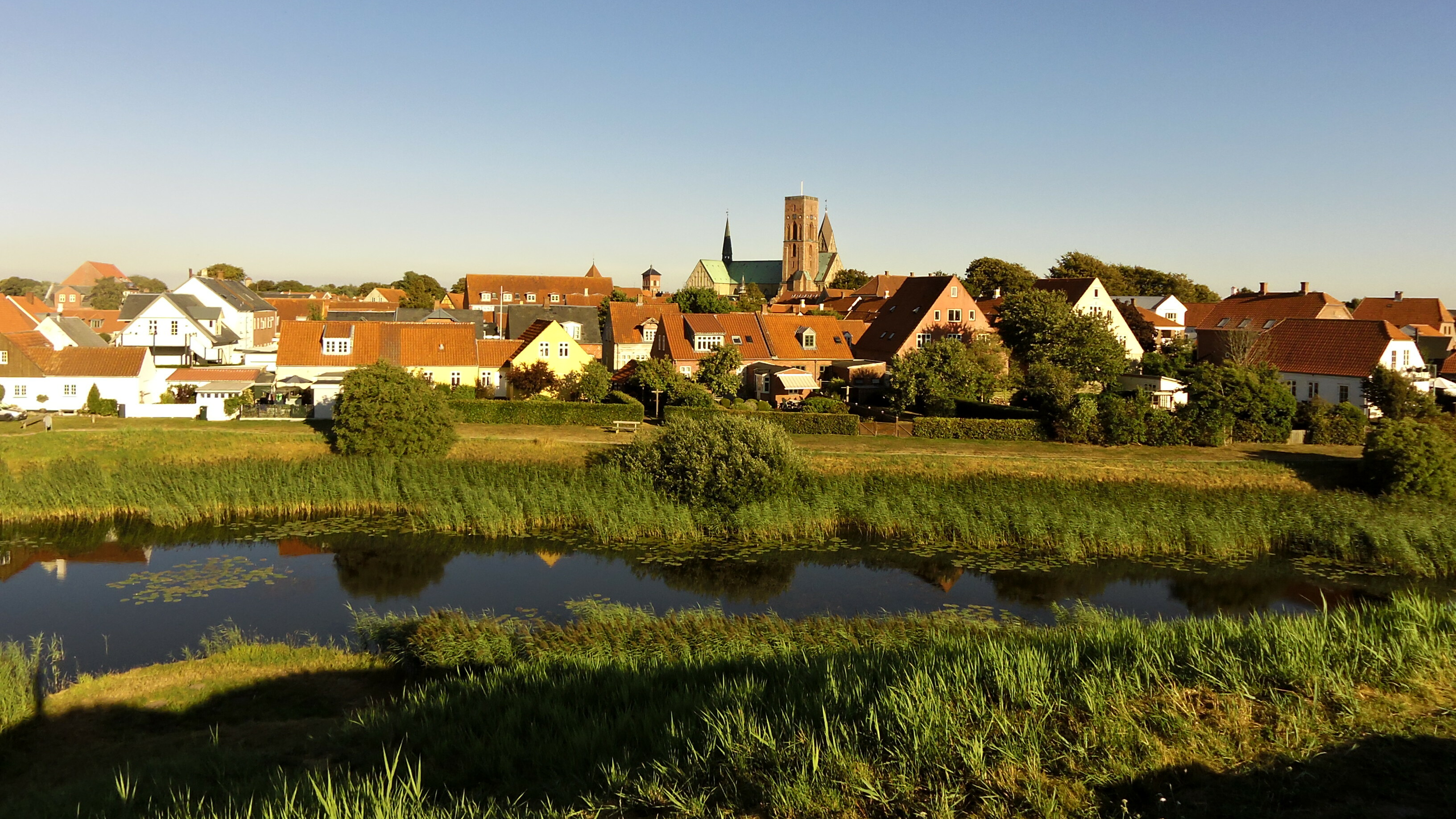
- Ribe seen from Riberhus

- Coat of arms

- Location in Denmark Ribe (Region of Southern Denmark)
- Coordinates: 55°19′42″N 08°45′44″E
- Country: Denmark
- Region: Southern Denmark (Syddanmark)
- Municipality: Esbjerg

Area
  - Urban: 7.4 km^{2} (2.9 sq mi)

Population (2026)
  - Urban: 8,403
  - Urban density: 1,100/km^{2} (2,900/sq mi)
  - Gender: 3,985 males and 4,418 females
- Demonym: Ripenser
- Time zone: UTC+1 (CET)
  - Summer (DST): UTC+2 (CEST)
- Postal code: DK-6760 Ribe
- Website: www.ribe.dk

Ribe (Danish pronunciation: [ˈʁiːpə]) is a town in southwestern Jutland, Denmark, with a population of 8,403 (1 January 2026). It is the seat of the Diocese of Ribe. Until 1 January 2007, Ribe was the seat of both a surrounding municipality and county. It is now part of the enlarged Esbjerg Municipality in the Region of Southern Denmark. It is the oldest town in Denmark.

== History ==
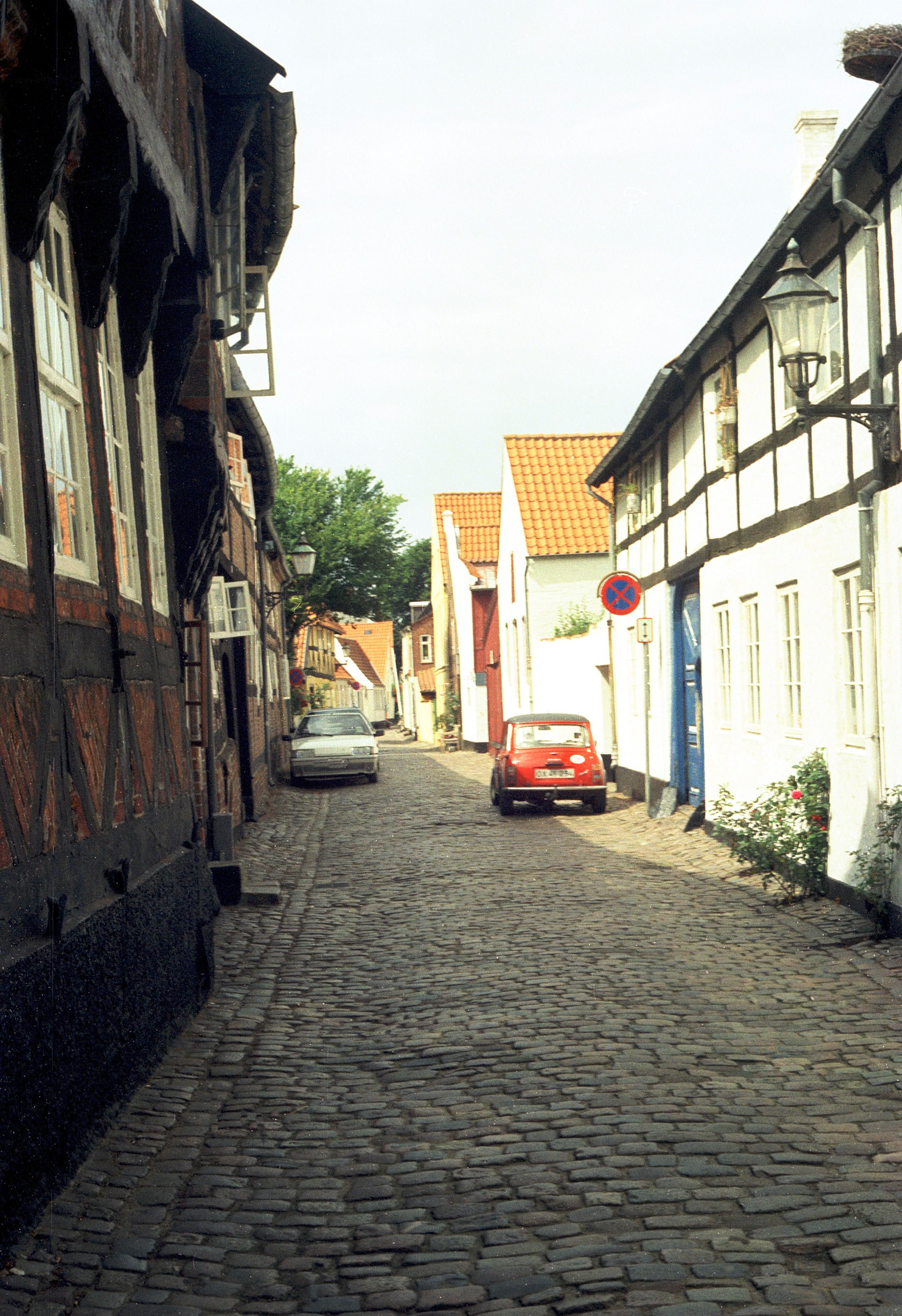
Street in Ribe

The town was a center of commercial activity in the early 8th century, and this may have been where the riches in Denmark originated, including with royal influence. Coins may have been struck there in 720. Whichever king was involved in the digging of the Kanhave Canal may have been involved in the establishment of Ribe also. Trade contacts were mostly with Frisia and England. Of the over 300 sceatas found in Denmark, 216 come from in or around Ribe, most of them were of the Frisian Wodan type, and these were likely minted in Ribe in the early eighth century. The Ancient Diocese of Ribe was established in 948 with the consecration of Leofdag of Ribe as its first bishop.

Early in the ninth century a 2-meter wide ditch (a demarcation rather than a fortification) was dug around the town, enclosing a 12-hectare area. Later that century the ditch was replaced by a moat, 6 to 7 meters wide. Archeological evidence shows Ribe was "an active and impressive market place" in the eighth and ninth centuries, and again at the end of the eleventh century, but there is little evidence from the period in between; the town may have dwindled or even disappeared.

When archbishop Ansgar set out to christianize Scandinavia, he requested (in about 860) of King Horik II of Denmark that the first Scandinavian church be built in Ribe, which at the time was one of the most important trade cities in Scandinavia. However, the presence in Ribe of a bishop, and thus a cathedral, can only be confirmed from the year 948. Recent archaeological excavations in Ribe, however, have led to the discovery of between 2,000 and 3,000 Christian graves. They have been dated to the ninth century, indicating that a large Christian community was already living peacefully together with the Vikings at the time. Excavations conducted between 2008 and 2012 have also revealed more details of the original church built by Ansgar.

Construction on the Ribe Cathedral started in 1150, on top of an earlier church, most probably Ansgar's church, built in 860. The Treaty of Ribe was proclaimed in 1460. Being located in a large region of low-lying marshland, Ribe has repeatedly been hit by storm floods, the most devastating being the Burchardi flood of 1634. The marks after this flood can still be seen on the cathedral's walls and is also marked as the top point on a flood pillar in the town.

The Catholic diocese was dissolved in 1536 during the Reformation; it was succeeded by the Diocese of Ribe, governed by the newly established protestant Church of Denmark.

Prior to 1864, Ribe and the surrounding area were an exclave of the Kingdom of Denmark surrounded on three sides by the Duchy of Schleswig. Following the Second Schleswig War and the Treaty of Vienna, a new boundary was demarcated south of Ribe, connecting the town to the rest of Denmark.

On 1 January 2007, the Municipality of Ribe ceased to exist as it merged with the municipalities of Esbjerg and Bramming, now forming the new municipality of Esbjerg.

== Demographics ==
The following table shows the population of Ribe. Data from before the 18th century are estimates, the rest are taken from the official census.

Year	Population
1500	~5,000
1591	~4,500
1641	~3,500
1672	~2,000

Year	Population
1769	1,827
1801	1,994
1850	2,984
1901	4,243

Year	Population
1976	7,452
1981	7,646
1986	7,709
1990	7,636

Year	Population
1996	8,105
2000	7,984
2001	8,031
2002	8,033

Year	Population
2003	8,006
2004	7,990
2006	8,081

== Notable sites ==
- Ribe Cathedral
- Ribe Kunstmuseum - an art museum
- Riberhus - a castle (only some ruins remain, along with the water moat) likely built by Eric V of Denmark in the 1200s
- Wadden Sea Centre - a museum and visitors center for the Wadden Sea National Park, located a few km outside Ribe

== Education ==
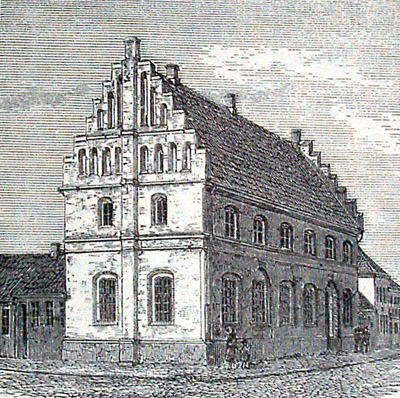
The old cityhall.

The town of Ribe has a long history as a center of learning. The cathedral school (Ribe Katedralskole) has its roots in the Latin School of Ribe, dating back to at least 1145, when the bishop officially handed over the chapter's school.

=== Schools ===
- Ribe Katedralskole
- The State College of Education in Ribe (Teacher Training College), part of the University College of West Jutland
- Ribe Business College
- VUC (Adult Education Center)

== Transport ==
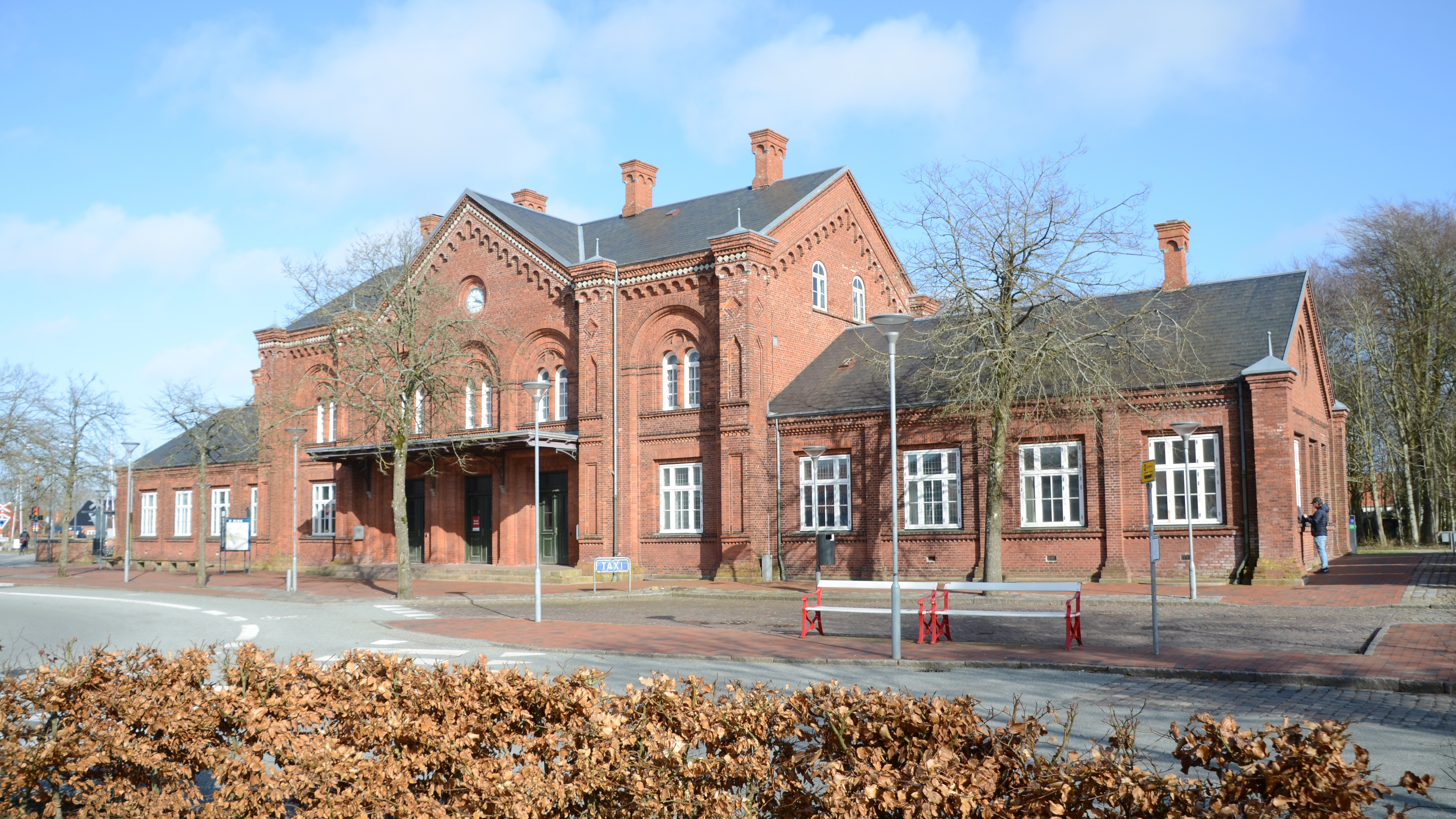
Ribe railway station in 2023

Ribe is served by Ribe railway station, located on the Bramming–Tønder railway line. The northern part of the town is also served by the railway halt Ribe Nørremark.

Ribe is located near the Wadden Sea coastline and within reach of the north sea port Esbjerg.

== Sports ==
The handball club Ribe-Esbjerg HH, and the progenitor Ribe HK, has played in the Danish top division on several occasions.

== Notable people ==
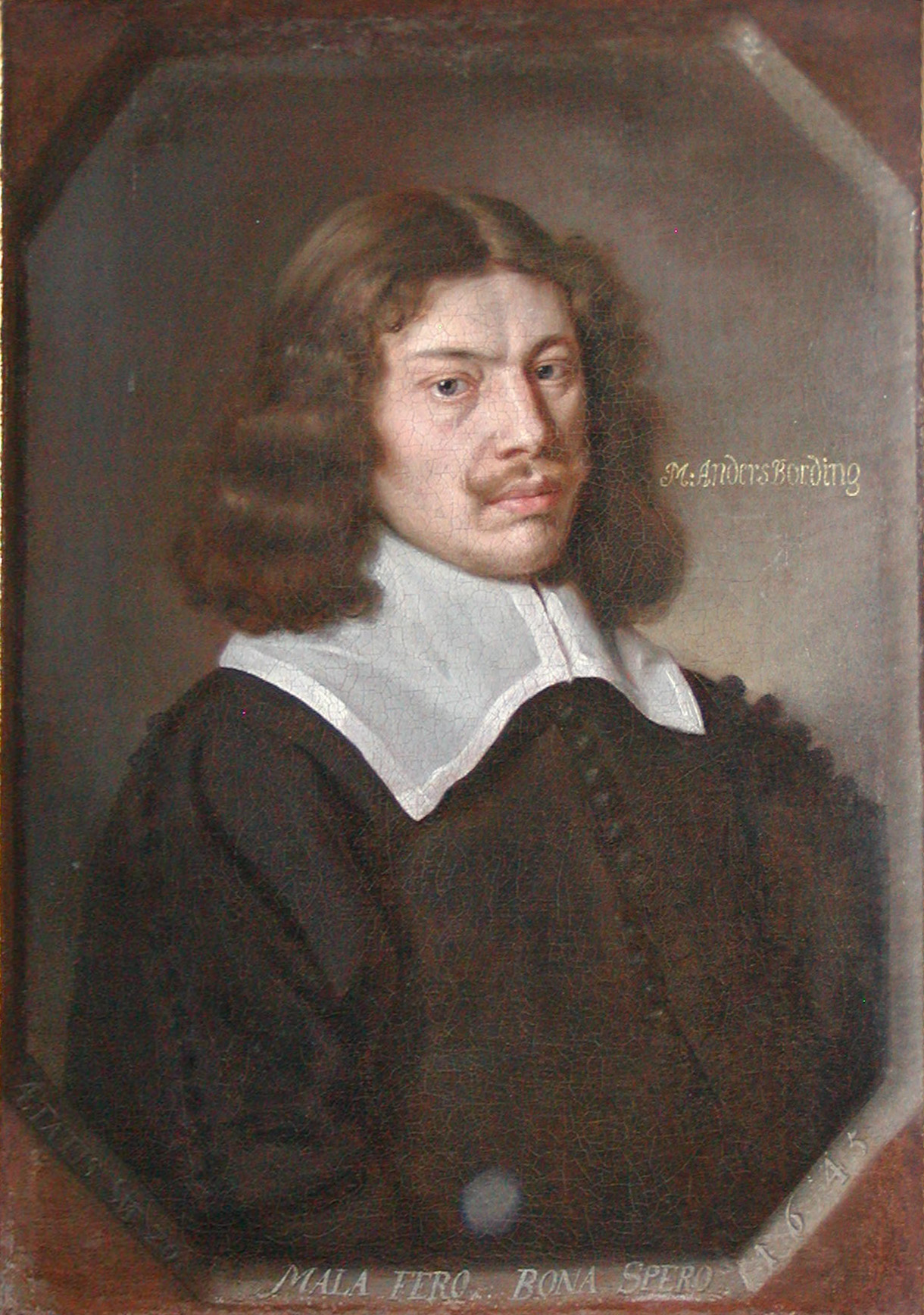
Anders Bording, 1645

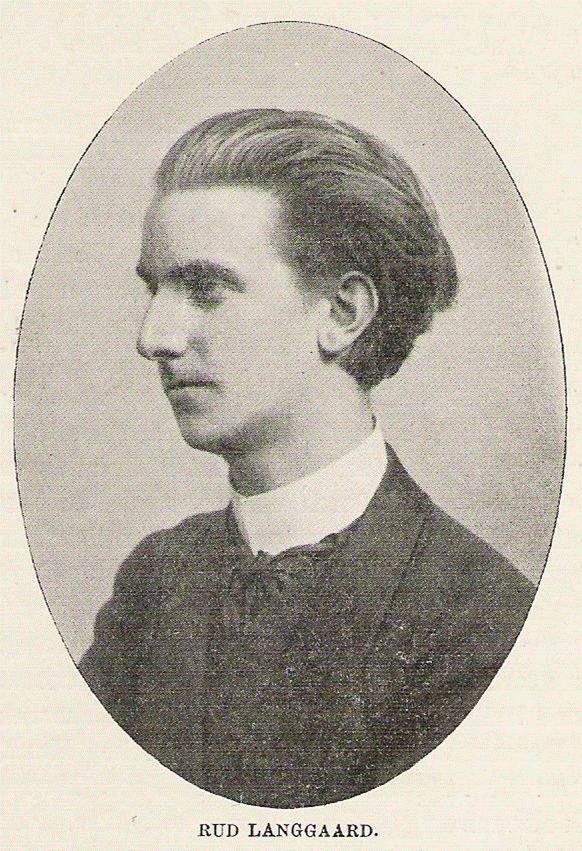
Rued Langgaard, 1917

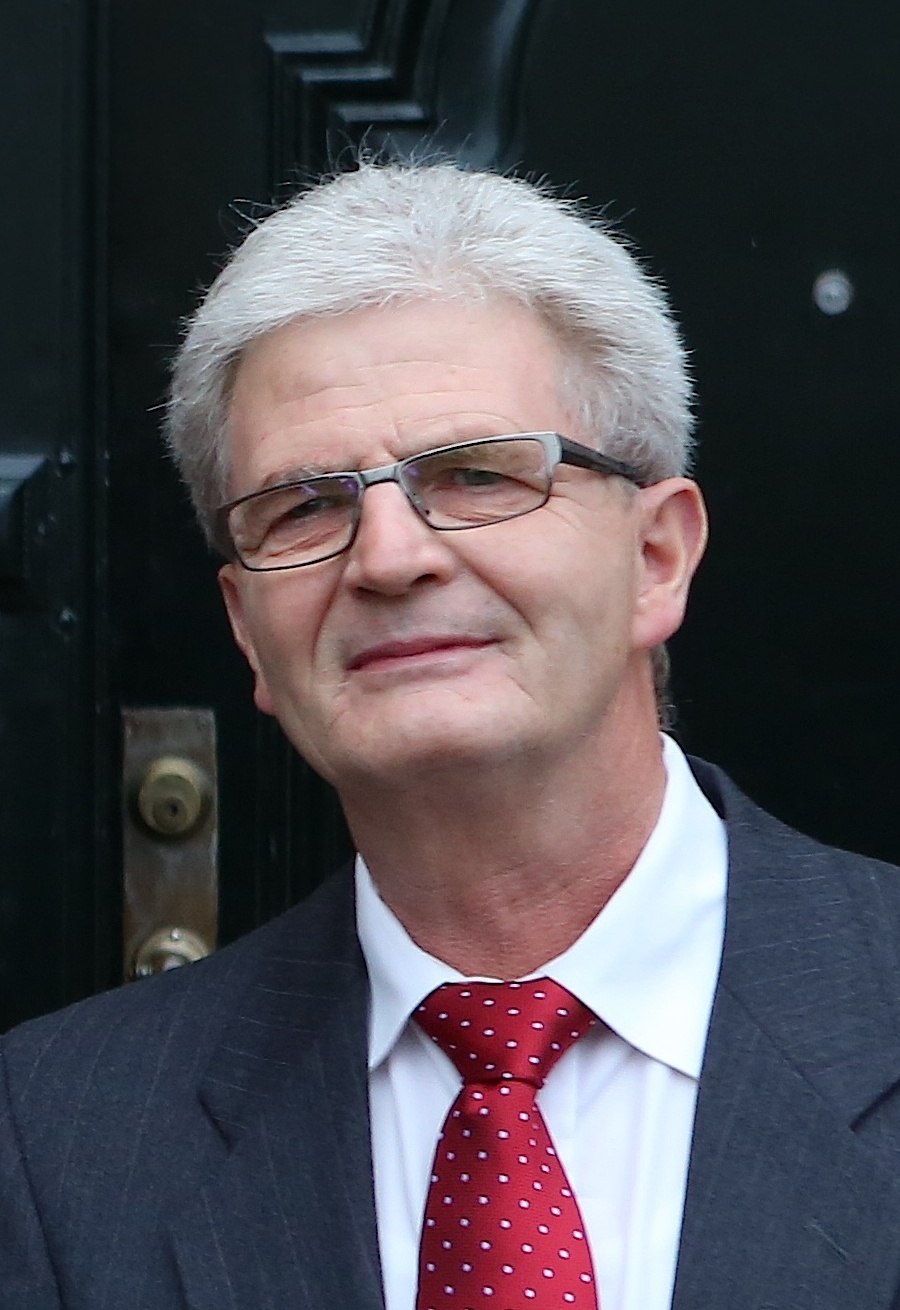
HK Nielsen, 2012

=== The arts ===
- Anders Bording (1619–1677), poet
- Christine Daugaard (1831–1917), Danish writer and poet
- Kristen Feilberg (1839 in Vester Vedsted – 1919), photographer of the peoples and landscapes of Sumatra and Singapore
- Jacob Riis (1849–1914), an American immigrant photographer, wrote How the Other Half Lives
- Bodil Hauschildt (1861–1951), photographer
- J. Bodewalt Lampe (1869–1929), American composer, arranger, performer
- Jens Olsen (1872–1945), a clockmaker and locksmith
- Astrid Noack (1888–1954), a Danish sculptor
- Rued Langgaard (1893–1952) a late-Romantic composer and organist at Ribe Cathedral
- Kjeld Abell (1901–1961), playwright, screenwriter and theatrical designer
- Børge Ring (1921–2018), animated short film writer, director and animator
- Annemette Kure Andersen (born 1969), poet and literary editor
- Per Vers (born 1976), rapper

=== Politicians, clergy, and officials ===
- Valdemar II of Denmark (1170–1241), King of Denmark
- Hans Tausen (1494–1561), leader of the Reformation in Denmark, Bishop of Ribe 1542–1562.
- Peder Palladius (1503–1560), theologian, priest and bishop
- Maren Spliid (c.1600–1641), victim of the persecution of witches
- Hans Schack, 2nd Count of Schackenborg (1676 in Ribe – 1719), nobleman
- Hans Adolf Brorson (1694–1764), Danish Pietist clergyman and hymn writer
- Friderich Christian Hager (1756–1795), colonial commander and governor of the Danish Gold Coast
- Christian N. Lund (1846–1921), Mormon pioneer and Utah Territorial Legislature member
- Elisabeth Dons Christensen (born 1944), theologian, bishop of the Diocese of Ribe 2003–2014
- Holger K. Nielsen (born 1950), former leader of the Socialist People's Party

=== Science and business ===
- Vibeke Jensdatter (1638–1709), merchant
- Emil Christian Hansen (1842–1909), brewmaster and mycologist
- Cathrine Horsbøl (1872–1947), furniture designer
- Jens Rasmussen (1926–2018), professor
- Erik Hansen (1927–2016), architect

=== Sport ===
- John Lauridsen (born 1959), footballer
- Martin Rauschenberg (born 1992), footballer
- Mikael Uhre (born 1994), footballer

== Twin cities and towns ==
- Balleroy, Normandy, France.
- Ely, Cambridgeshire, United Kingdom.
- Güstrow, Mecklenburg-Vorpommern, Germany.
- Krems, Lower Austria, Austria.
- Leikanger, Sogn og Fjordane, Norway.
- Ratzeburg, Schleswig-Holstein, Germany.
- Strängnäs, Södermanland, Sweden.
- Tainan, Taiwan.

== See also ==
- Dankirke

== Sources ==
- The New Cambridge Medieval History. Cambridge University Press, 1995. ISBN 0-521-36292-X.
- s:Catholic Encyclopedia (1913)/Ancient See of Ribe in Denmark (Jutland)
