= Jensdatter =

Jensdatter is a Danish surname. Notable people with the surname include:

- Dorte Jensdatter (1672–1722), Danish murder victim
- Vibeke Jensdatter (1638–1709), Danish merchant
