= Skødstrup, Ribe =

Village in Southern Denmark

Coordinates: 55°37′N 8°16′E

Skødstrup is a village in Region of Southern Denmark (formerly in Ribe County) in Denmark.
