= Dankirke =

Danish Iron Age settlement

Coordinates: 55°17′00″N 8°42′20″E

Dankirke was a Danish Iron Age settlement in south-west Jutland, located near the later town of Ribe. It was divided into East Dankirke and West Dankirke. Elise Thorvildsen's excavations of the settlement from 1965-1970 uncovered the remnants of houses dating to the 4th or 5th century AD thus making Dankirke one of Denmark's earliest cities. Some believe that Denmark's first church was built in Dankirke, but generally it is agreed that the first Christian church in Denmark was built in Hedeby around the year 850. The village was located close to the sea, which allowed trade with other countries such as England. Up to the year 700 Dankirke was one of the most important of Denmark's trading cities, until it was surpassed by Ribe. Dankirke's archeological findings are exhibited at the National Museum of Denmark in Copenhagen.
