= Wadden Sea Centre =

Danish museum

Coordinates: 55°17′45″N 8°40′09″E

- Vadehavscentret
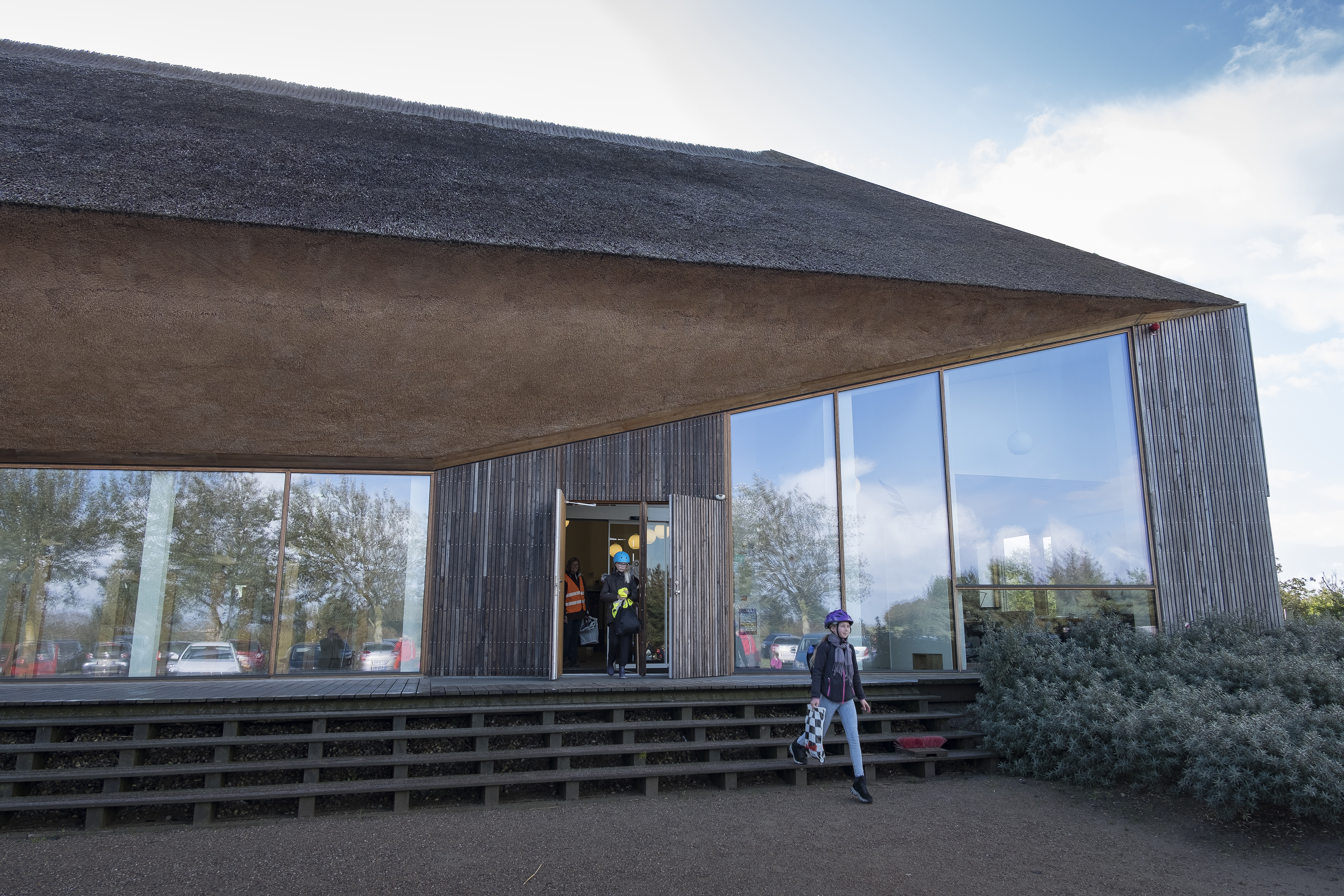
- Location: Vester Vedsted, near Ribe, Denmark

The Wadden Sea Centre (Danish: Vadehavscentret) is a visitor centre and museum for the UNESCO World Heritage Site the Wadden Sea, an intertidal zone of the North Sea. The centre is located in Vester Vedsted, near Ribe, Denmark, and opened in February 2017. It serves to raise awareness of the Wadden Sea and the marshlands around it.

== Features and exhibits ==
The centre features many exhibits and activities, some of which are listed below.

=== The Migration of Birds ===
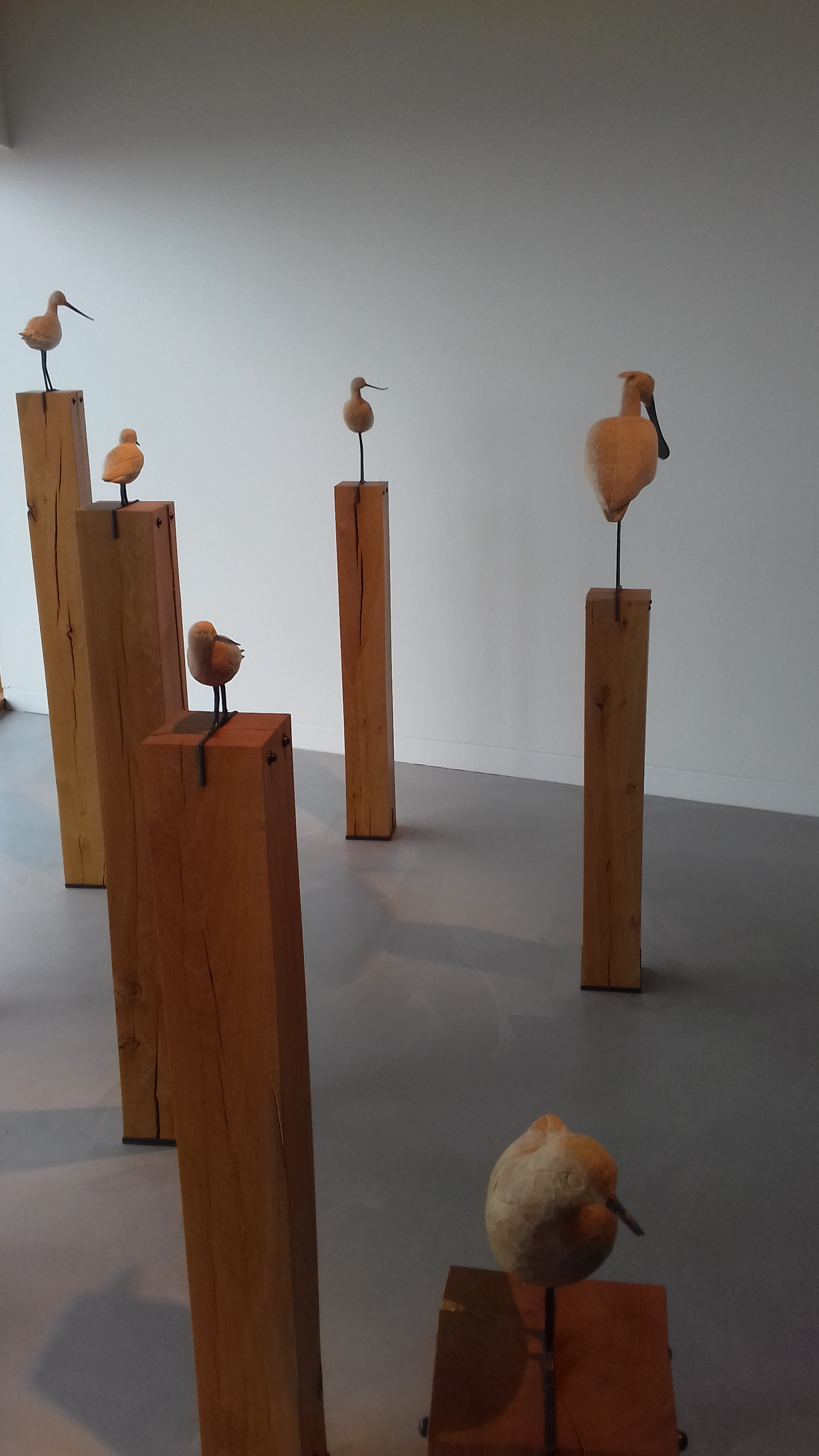
The Migration of Birds

Two rooms at the centre are dedicated exclusively to learning about the birds, with videos, interactive games featuring bird calls and art featuring the various birds of the Wadden Sea.

=== The Sky ===
A large area where visitors can explore items from the Wadden Sea with microscopes, as well as learn about the various birds from the region.

=== The Landscape of the Wadden Sea ===
Room dedicated to tides and storm floods of the Wadden Sea. Videos on the walls show the various environments found in the Wadden Sea region, and there are several installations explaining the tides and their effect on the environment. An interactive sand box installation shows settlements forming on higher ground.

=== Life in the Wadden Sea ===
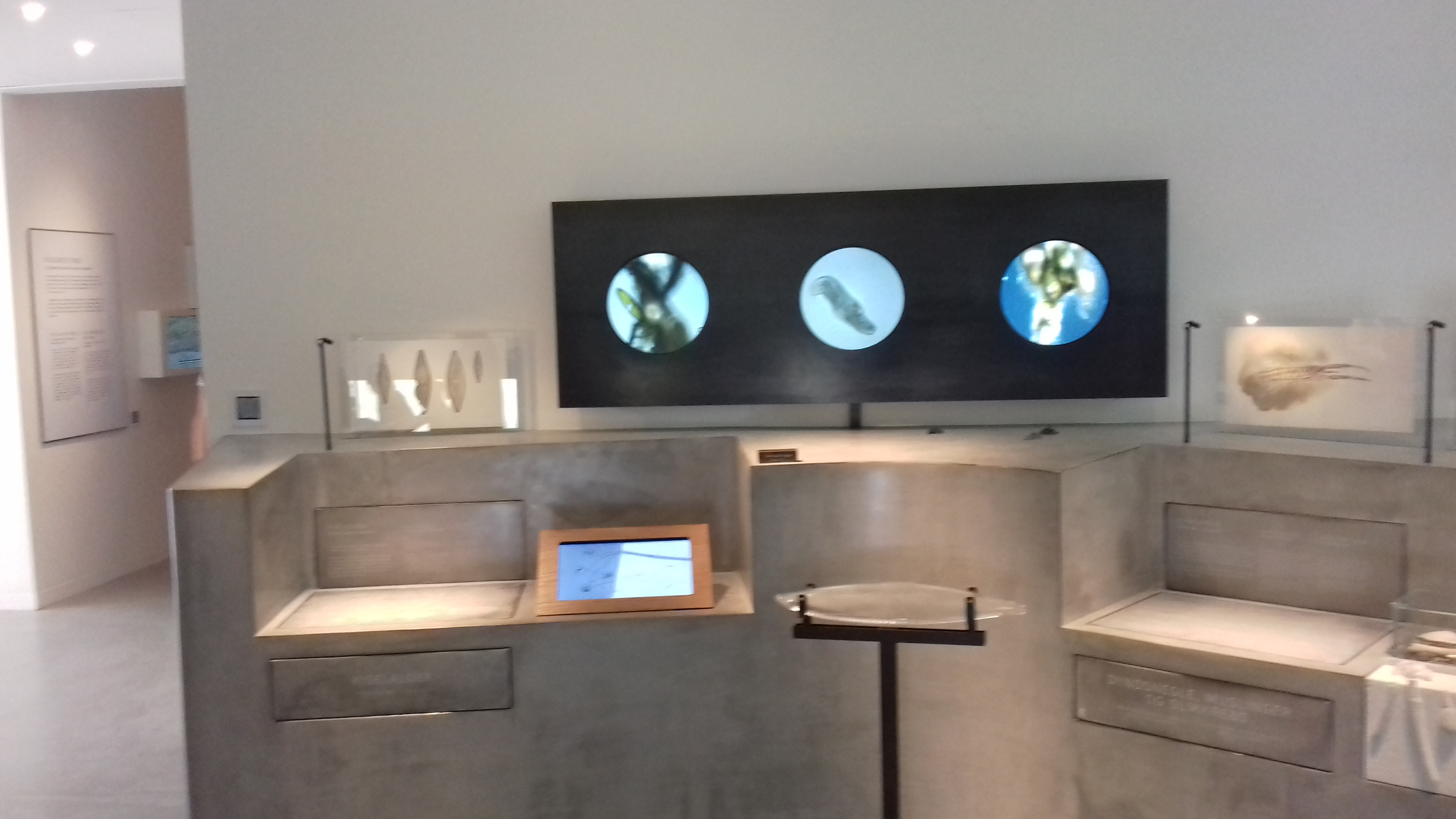
Life in the Wadden Sea

An area featuring three tanks with creatures from the Wadden Sea, the largest of which visitors are invited to put their hands in.

=== The Anatomy of Migratory Birds ===
An exhibition featuring interactive displays, bones, preserved specimens and artwork all teaching about the anatomy of birds.

=== Tales of the Wadden Sea ===
An exhibit dedicated to the peoples who have lived along the Wadden Sea.

=== The Departure ===
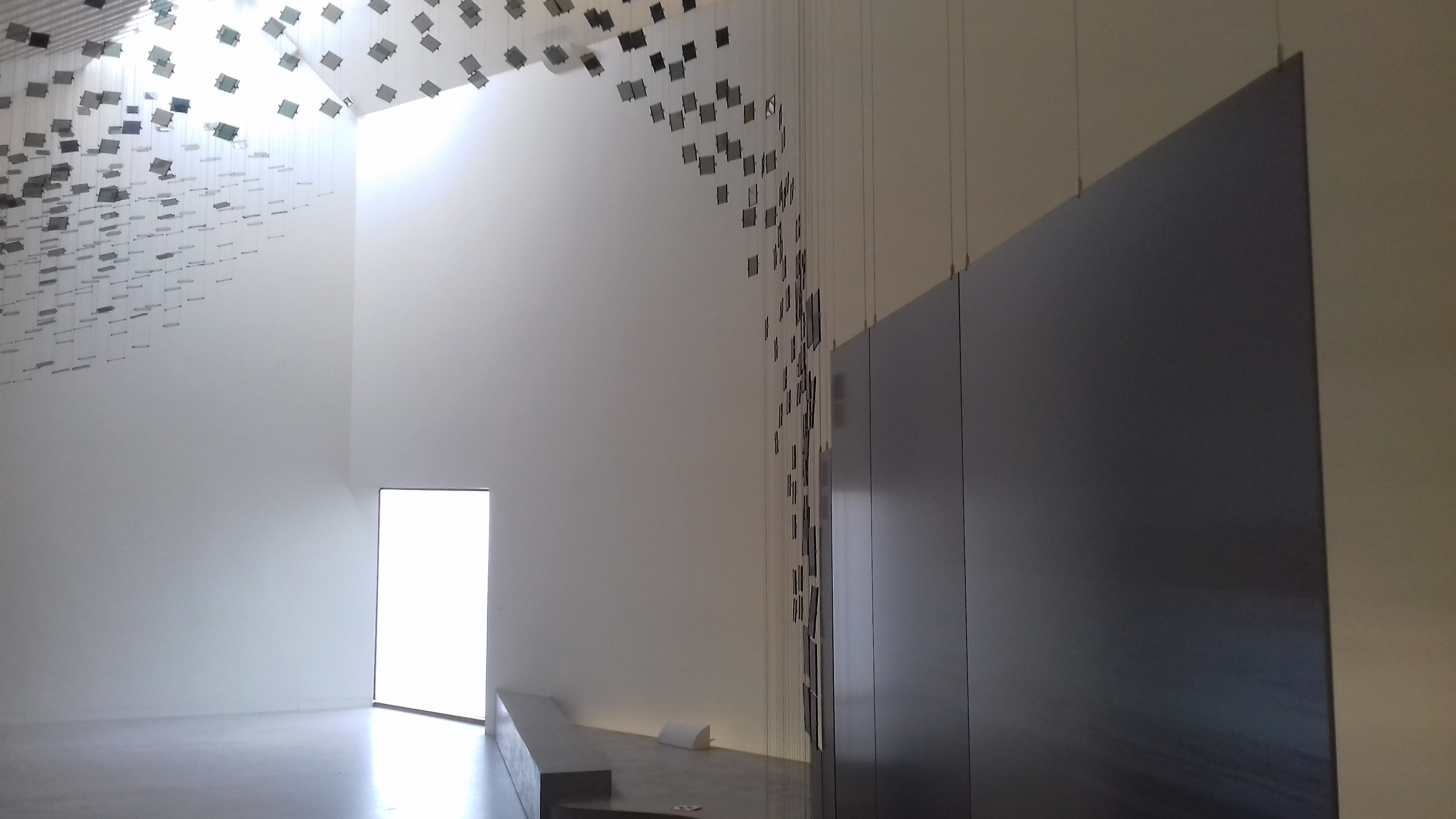
Art installation "The Departure"

The final room in the exhibition features an artwork of glass with video projections showing the flight of birds.

=== Other Features ===
- Cafe
- Small theater showing a film about storms on the Wadden Sea
- Gift Shop

== Tours ==
The centre offers tours to the Wadden Sea (including oyster tours) and the neighboring island of Mandø.

== Architecture ==
The building was designed by Danish architect Dorte Mandrup and was named Danish Building of the Year in 2017 by a committee of Denmark's top architects. The centre is the built in cooperation with Esbjerg Municipality, the A.P. Møller Fund, Arbejdsmarkedets Feriefond, Danish Outdoor Council, Louis Petersens Legat, Augustinus Fonden and Realdania.

== Gallery ==
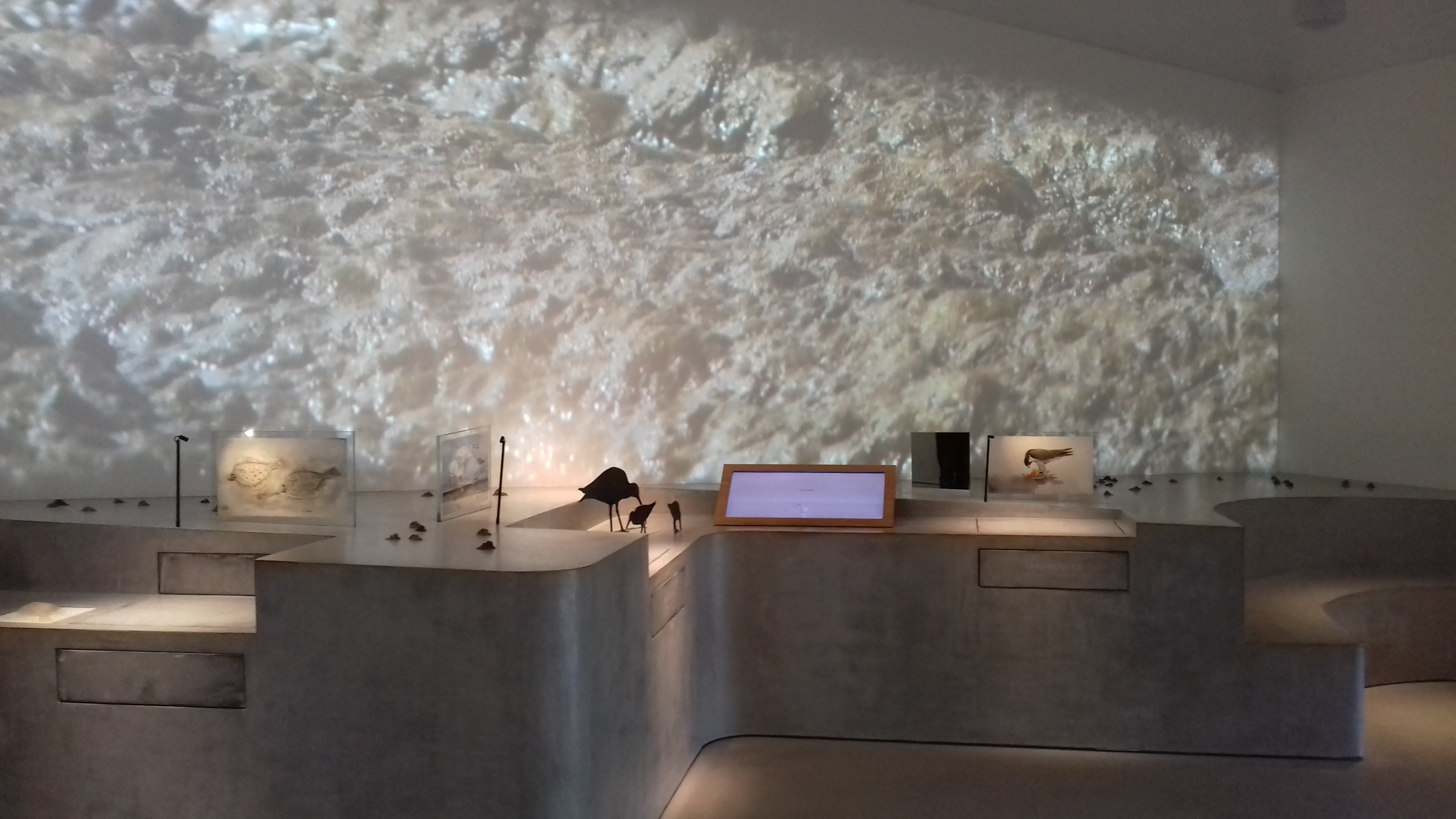
Life in the Wadden Sea

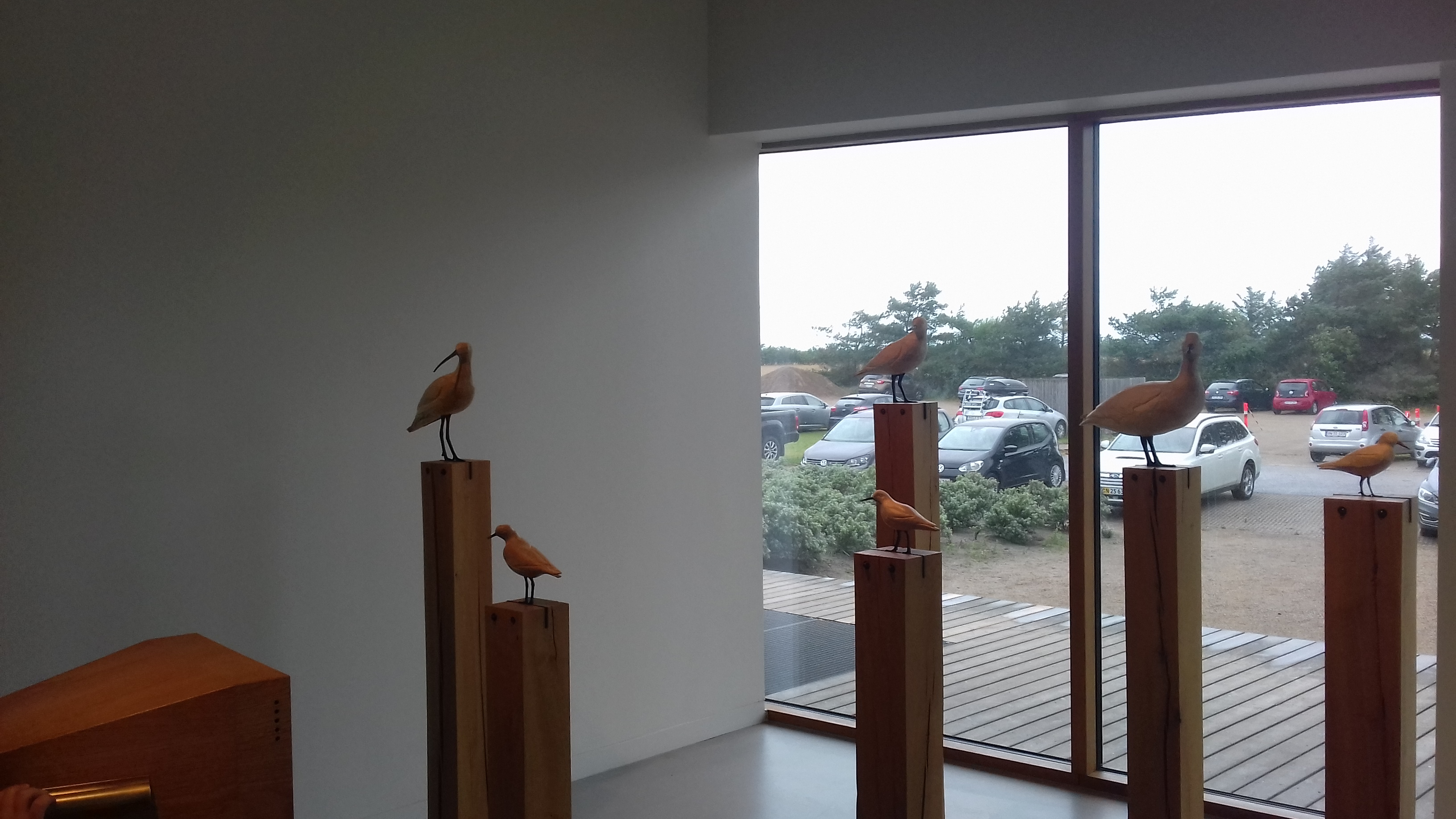
The Migration of Birds

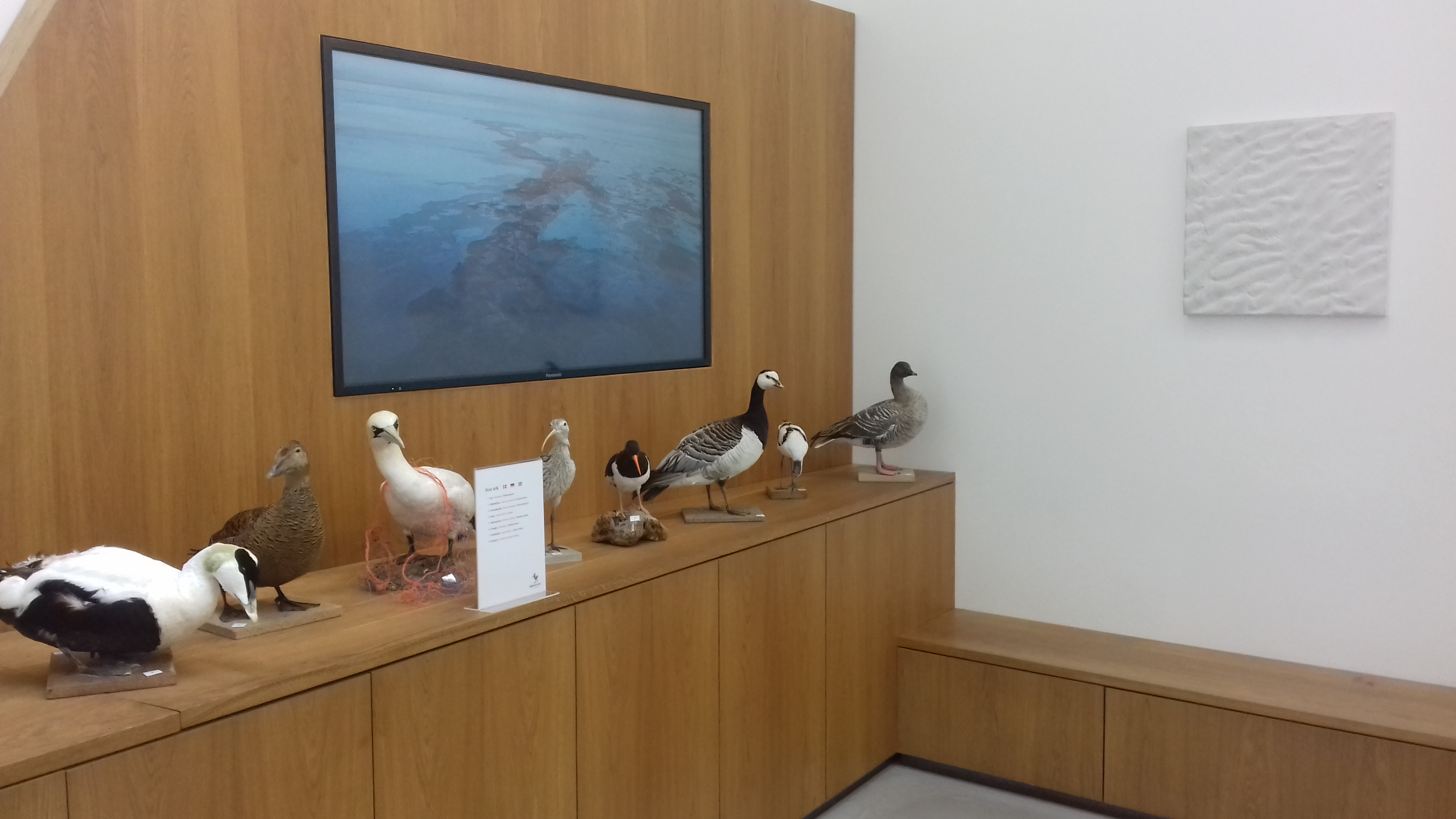
Preserved birds in The Sky

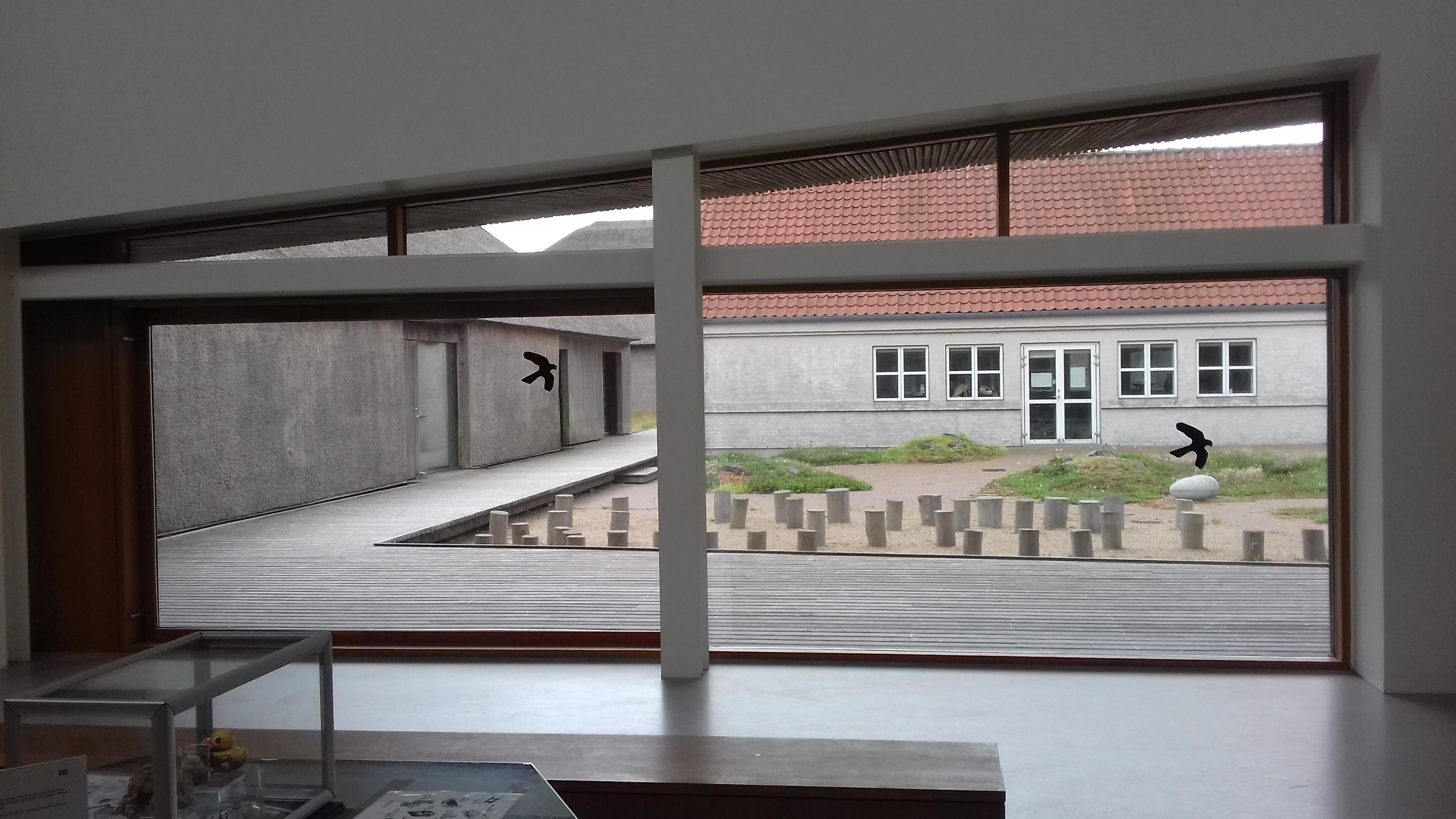
View of inner courtyard

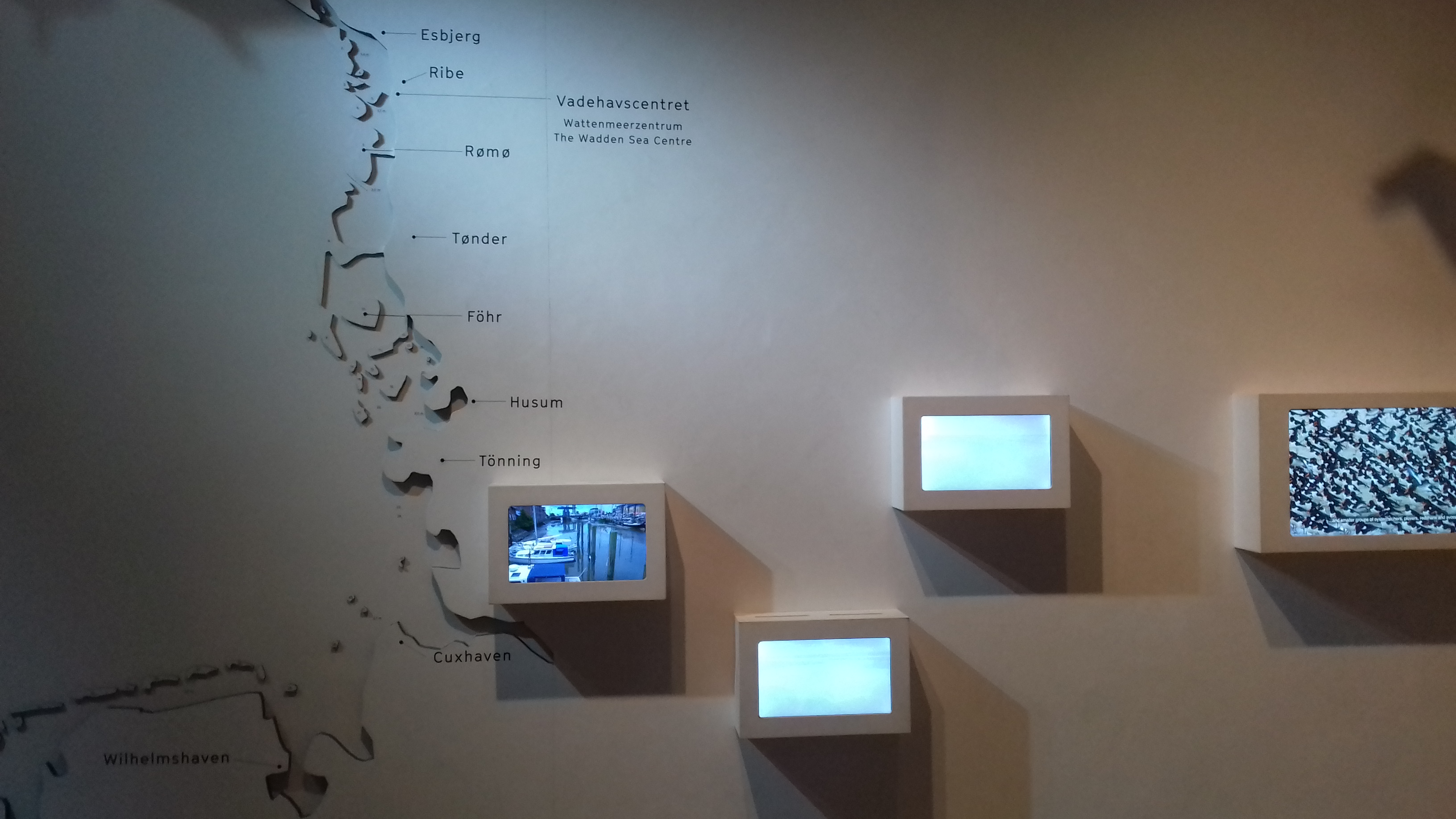
The Landscape of the Wadden Sea

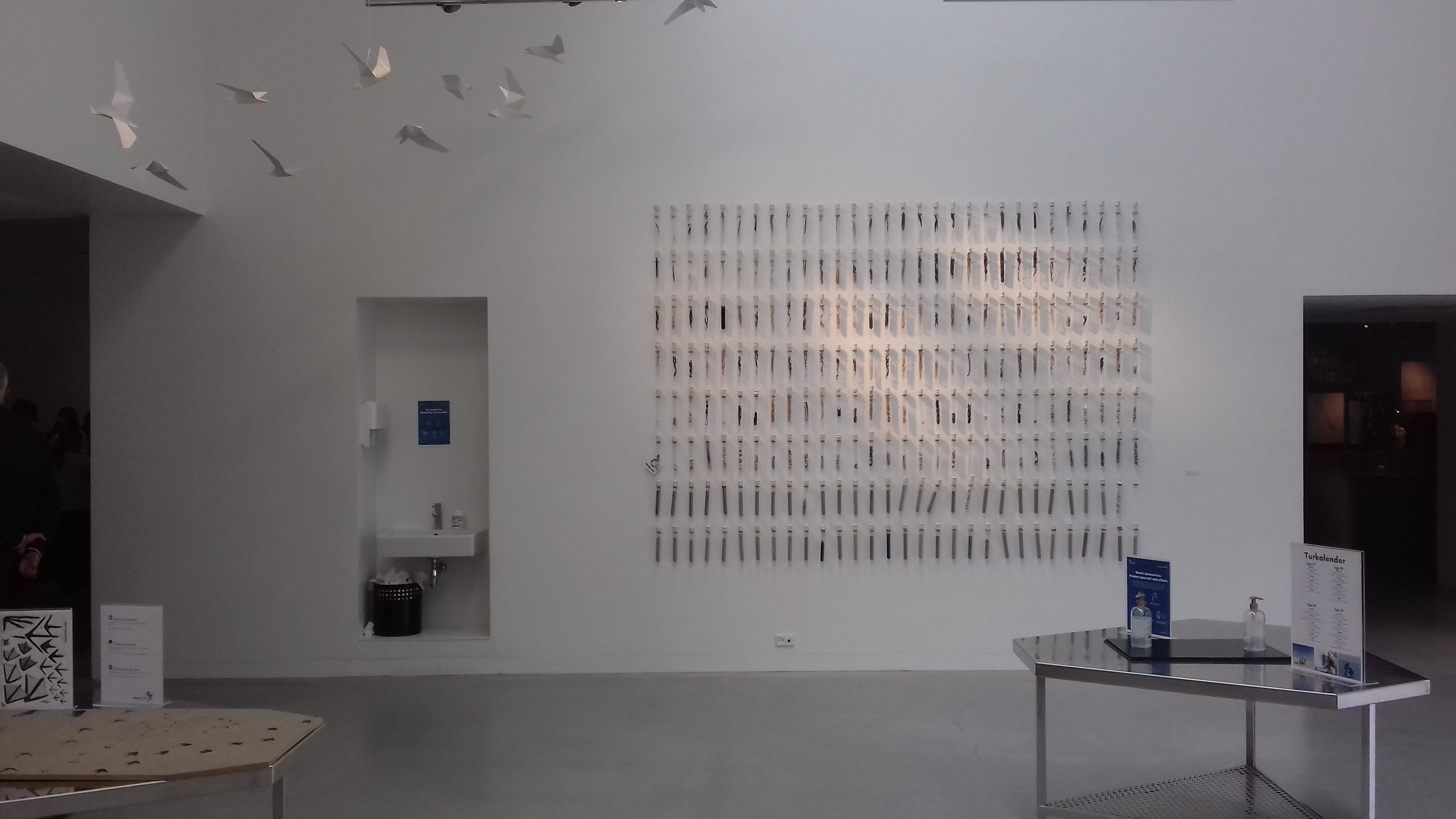
The Sky
