= List of national parks of Denmark =

National parks in Denmark (Northeast Greenland National Park not shown)

There are six national parks in the Kingdom of Denmark; five in Denmark proper and one in Greenland.

The first national park in Denmark proper was Thy National Park (Danish: Nationalpark Thy), created in 2008. It is located in Thisted Municipality, Nordjylland. The park is a narrow stretch of land along the North Jutlandic Island's west coast from Hanstholm southward to Agger Tange, excluding Hanstholm, Klitmøller, Nørre Vorupør, Stenbjerg and Agger. Thy National Park is named after Thy, an area that includes not only today's national park but also adjacent land further east. The park has dunes, heath, forests and grassland and also covers several small lakes and a small part of the Limfjord, which is the fjord that separates the North Jutlandic Island from the Cimbrian Peninsula.

In August 2009, the second national park Mols Bjerge National Park was inaugurated, followed by Wadden Sea National Park in October 2010, Land of the Scylding National Park in 2015, and Kongernes Nordsjælland National Park in 2018. An additional area in mainland Denmark was proposed in 2008 to become a national park: the Skjern Å Nationalpark (after the river of the same name), but it was abandoned in 2012, though the process was restarted in 2018 and is ongoing.

In 2020, work began on establishing nature national parks. These will strictly be on land owned by the Danish state, unlike the ordinary national parks where some parts are on private and municipal land. This gives the state greater control over the full area in the nature national parks and allows greater protection of the nature. Fifteen nature national parks are planned, including five that are part of the original national parks (Gribskov within Kongernes Nordsjælland National Park, Hellerup Forest and Teglstrup Hegn within Kongernes Nordsjælland National Park, Bidstrup Forests within Land of the Scylding National Park, Mols Bjerge within Mols Bjerge National Park, and Hanstholm within Thy National Park).

Greenland has had its own national park since 1974. The Northeast Greenland National Park stretches across three fifths of the northern parts of Greenland's east coast and, since its expansion in 1988, two thirds of the eastern parts of Greenland's north coast. Bounded by the coasts, the park covers the island's entire north-eastern quarter, all of which is almost uninhabited.

Like Greenland, the Faroe Islands forms another autonomous region of the Kingdom of Denmark, but contains no national parks.

List of national parks in the Kingdom of Denmark
Image	Name	Danish name	Region	Area in km^{2}	Establishment	External link
	Northeast Greenland National Park (Note: Official English name unknown. A WCMC web page uses “North-east Greenland National Park”.)	Grønlands Nationalpark	Northeast Greenland	972,000	1974	—
	Thy National Park	Nationalpark Thy	Nordjylland	243.7	2008	SNS
	Mols Bjerge National Park (Mols Mountains)	Nationalpark Mols Bjerge	Midtjylland	180 (Note: About 150 km² land and about 30 km² sea.)	2009	SNS
	Wadden Sea National Park	Nationalpark Vadehavet	Southern Denmark	1,466	2010	SNS
	Land of the Scylding National Park (Land of the Scylding)	Nationalpark Skjoldungernes Land	Zealand	170	2015	SNS
	Kongernes Nordsjælland National Park	Nationalpark Kongernes Nordsjælland	Hovedstaden	262.5	2018	SNS

== Footnotes ==
Notes
