= Christian N. Lund =

American politician (1846–1921)

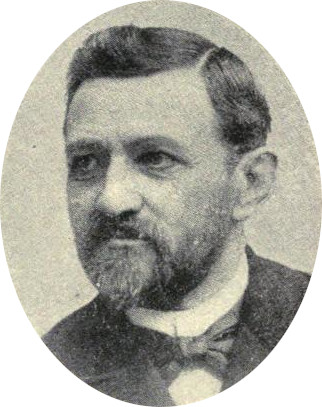
- Born: January 13, 1846; Ribe, Denmark
- Died: July 5, 1921 (aged 75); Mount Pleasant, Utah
- Known for: Mayor, legislator, and LDS ecclesiastical leader in Sanpete County, Utah

Christian Nielsen Lund (13 January 1846 – 5 July 1921) was a Mormon pioneer and a member of the Utah Territorial Legislature.

Lund was born in Sest parish, Ribe amt, Denmark. He converted to the Church of Jesus Christ of Latter-day Saints (LDS Church) when he was 12. From 1865 to 1868, Lund was an LDS missionary in Denmark; during his mission he was a branch president. He emigrated to the United States in 1868, going on the last LDS charter sailing ship (after this LDS emigrant companies used steam ships) and was part of the last overland Mormon pioneer company before the railroad was completed.

In 1869, Lund married Petra Antonie Maria Jensen, a native of Denmark. After her death he married Anna Nielsen, who was also from Denmark.

Lund settled in Mount Pleasant, Utah Territory, shortly after his first marriage. He served as city recorder, member of the city council, mayor, and justice of the peace. He was a member of the territorial legislature in 1890 and 1894 and a member of the Utah State Constitutional Conventions of 1882 and 1888, both of which had their attempts to gain statehood rejected by the United States Congress.

From 1879 to 1880, Lund served a mission for the LDS Church in Minnesota and the surrounding states. From 1890 to 1896, he was the bishop of the Mount Pleasant Ward. From 1896 to 1898, he served as president of the Scandinavian Mission of the LDS Church. When the North Sanpete Stake was formed in 1898, covering the northern part of the county, Lund became its first president.
