= Ribe Municipality =

Coordinates: 55°19′45″N 8°46′31″E

Ribe Municipality Ribe Kommune
- Former Municipalities of Denmark
- Coat of arms
- Interactive map of Ribe Municipality
- Country: Denmark
- 1970 Danish Municipal Reform: April 1, 1970
- Merged into Esbjerg Municipality: January 1, 2007
- Seat: Ribe

Area
  - Total: 351.98 km^{2} (135.90 sq mi)

Population (2006)
  - Total: 18,139
  - Density: 51.534/km^{2} (133.47/sq mi)
- Time zone: UTC1 (CET)
  - Summer (DST): UTC2 (CEST)

Ribe Municipality is a former municipality in Denmark. It was located on the west coast of the Jutland peninsula and belonged to Ribe County. It was abolished effective 1 January 2007. The municipal seat was located in the town of Ribe.

The municipality covered an area of 352 km^{2}, with a total population of 18,147 (2005). It also included the island of Manø but not nearby Fanø. Its last mayor was Preben Rudiengaard, representing the liberal political party, Venstre.

== Geography ==
Neighboring municipalities were Gram and Rødding to the east, Holsted, Bramming to the north, and Skærbæk to the south. Its western border was defined by the waters of the North Sea. The island of Mandø, located in the North Sea, is connected to the rest of the municipality by a road. Mandø is surrounded by the waters of Knude Deep (Knudedyb) and Juvre Deep (Juvre Dyb), respectively to the north and south of the island.

== Merger ==
On 1 January 2007, Ribe Municipality merged with Bramming Municipality and Esbjerg Municipality, forming a new Esbjerg Municipality. This was a result of Kommunalreformen ("The Municipality Reform" of 2007). The new Esbjerg Municipality has an area of 741 km^{2} and a total population of 114,097 (2005) It belongs to Region of Southern Denmark.
