= Hans Edvard Nørregård-Nielsen =

Danish art historian (1945–2023)

Hans Edvard Nørregård-Nielsen (2 January 1945 – 2 April 2023) was a Danish art historian.

Nørregård-Nielsen was born in Sønder Nissum. He was an alumnus of Ribe Katedralskole and wrote several memoirs. In 2001, he was awarded the De Gyldne Laurbær prize for Riber Ret. His 1995 book, Golden Age of Danish Art reviews early nineteenth-century art. He was Chairman of the New Carlsberg Foundation Board until the end of 2013. He was also an adjunct professor of art history at the Aarhus University. He was awarded the Ingenio et Arti gold medal in 2013.

Nørregård-Nielsen died on 2 April 2023, at the age of 78.

== Awards ==
Nørgaard-Nielsen received the N. L. Høyen Medal in 2003.

== See also ==
- Danish Culture Canon
