= Bodil Hauschildt =

Danish photographer (1861–1951)

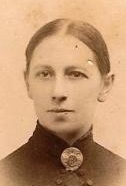
Bodil Hauschildt (1888)

Bodil Hauschildt (1861–1951) was an early Danish photographer who ran her own studio in Ribe from 1880. In addition to her portraits, she is remembered for her many photographs of the city and its surroundings.

== Early life ==
Born on 9 October 1861 in Ribe, Hauschildt was the daughter of a local grocer, Jess Møler Hauschildt, who died when only 29. Thereafter she spent her infancy with her mother Karen (née Rasmussen) and her two sisters at Dronning Louises Børneasyl, a home for widowed mothers on Puggaardsgade. On completing her schooling at Miss Guldberg's school in Ribe, she worked as an au pair, first in the vicarage of Fårup near Randers, then with a family in Kolding.

== Career ==
Always interested in drawing and painting, Hauschildt served an apprenticeship with the Ribe photographer Mathilde Bruun who introduced her to the business. She was also taught by Sophus Juncker-Jensen (1859–1940) who opened a studio in Copenhagen in 1888, after studying photography in Paris. In 1890, Hauschildt acquired Bruun's studio on Alléen ved Kirkegaarden but moved into larger premises on Dagmarsgade around 1896. In 1904, while Christian IX was in Ribe for the inauguration of the renovated cathedral, Bodel Hauschildt was appointed court photographer. Hauschildt's photographs of the royal family and the restored cathedral were published in Illustreret Tidende. Around 1908, she moved to Aarhus where she opened a studio on Sct Clemenstorv. During that period, she travelled to Rome where she came into contact with two local photographers. On returning to Denmark, she spent more time in Aarhus but in 1920 re-established her business in Ribe. Strongly influenced by her stay in Rome, she decorated her studio in the Italian style, adding pillars, battlements and fired tiling to the exterior.

In addition to her professional portraits, Hauschildt photographed or painted scenes in and around Ribe, often collaborating with Stephan Ussing (1868–1958), a local painter. Her photographs can be recognized by her unmistakable style, often employing unconventional angles and experimental lighting. She photographed everything of interest in Ribe, leaving behind some 2,000 plates. Around 1922, she engaged her friend Anna Bøysen who took over management of the studio in 1939. Hauschildt nevertheless kept an eye on the business until her death on Christmas Eve, 1951.
