= Marsk Tower =

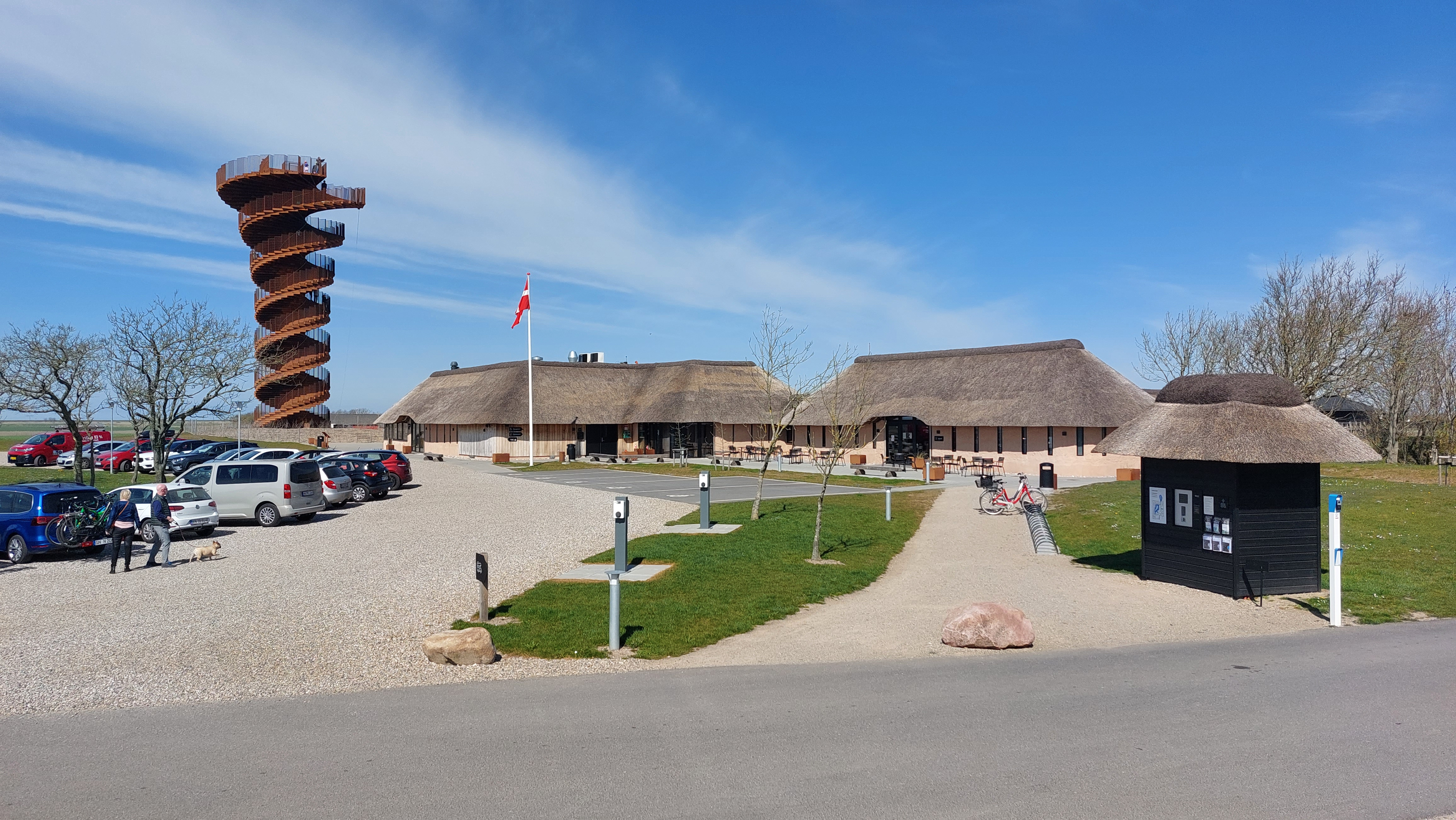
- The main building of the Marsk Camp and the Marsk Tower
- Interactive map of the Marsk Tower area

General information
- Status: Completed
- Type: observation tower
- Location: Wadden Sea National Park, Skærbæk, Denmark
- Coordinates: 55.15298368944522°N 8.740824955856008°E
- Topped-out: August 11, 2021

Height
- Height: 25 meters (82 feet)

Dimensions
- Weight: 300 tons

Technical details
- Material: Corton steel

Website
- Official website

Marsk Tower ("Marsh Tower" in English) is a double helix-shaped corten steel observation tower designed by the Bjarke Ingels Group located in Wadden Sea National Park, specifically at the Marsk Camp in the southern Denmark town of Skærbæk. it overlooks both the North Sea and the park itself. The tower, a double spiral staircase consisting of 272 steps (141 ascending and 131 descending), was commissioned by the town of Skærbæk in an effort to boost tourism to the area.

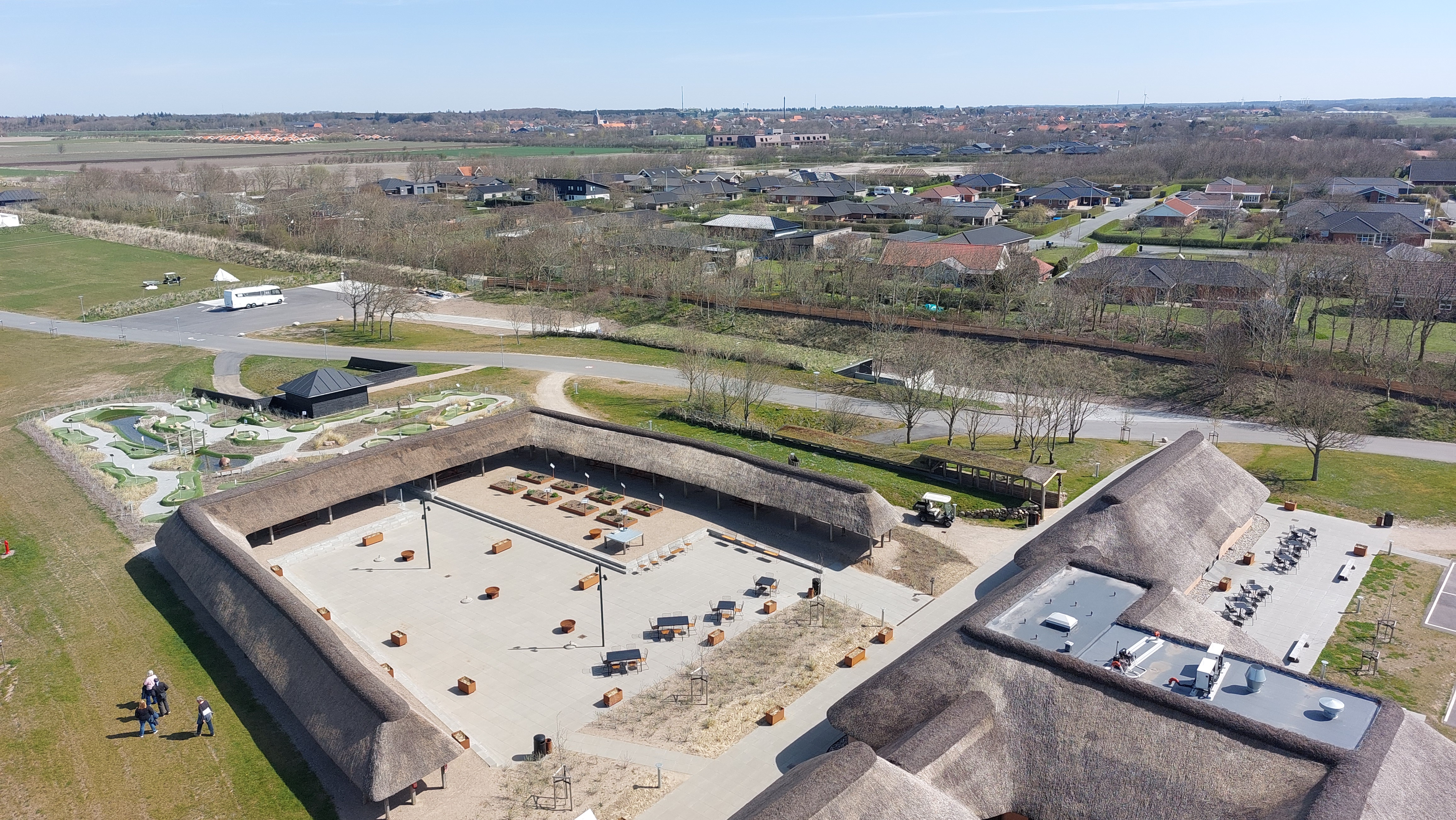
View from the tower in the direction of Skærbæk

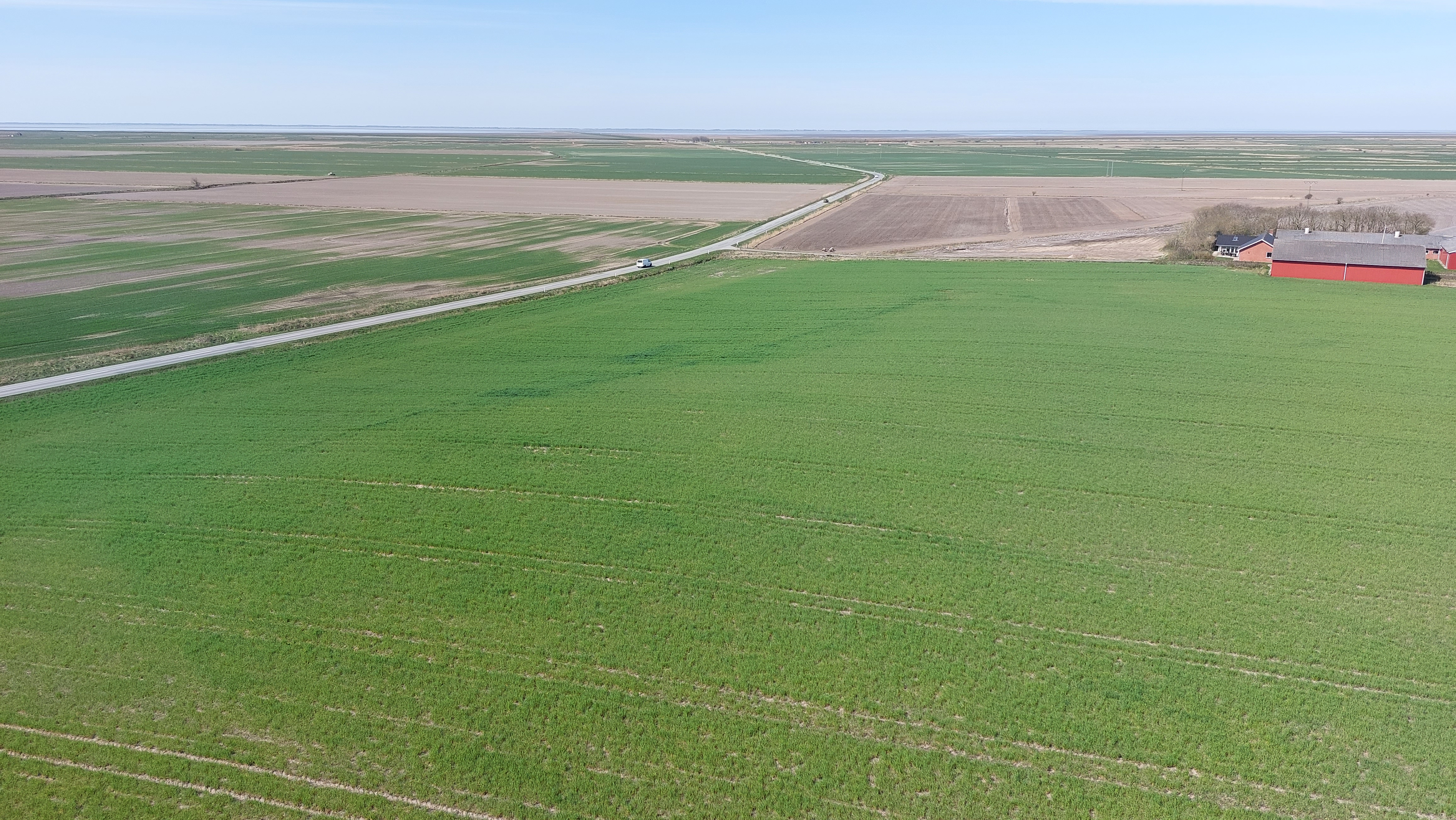
View from the tower in the direction of Rømø
