= Skjoldungernes Land National Park =

National park in Denmark

- On the Skjoldunge trail in the Bidstrup Forests (2015)
- Interactive map of Skjoldungernes Land National Park
- Location: Frederikssund Municipality; Lejre Municipality; Roskilde Municipality
- Nearest city: Roskilde
- Coordinates: 55°40′N 11°59′E
- Area: 170 km^{2} (66 sq mi)
- Designated: 2015
- Named for: Scyldingas
- Website: nationalparkskjoldungernesland.dk

Skjoldungernes Land National Park (Danish: Nationalpark Skjoldungernes Land) is a national park in central Zealand, Denmark. The name Skjoldungernes Land (lit. 'Land of the Scyldingas') refers to the Scyldingas, a legendary dynasty of Danish kings.

== History ==
The proposal to establish the national park was prepared by three municipalities, Roskilde and Lejre and Frederikssund, as well as the Danish Society for Nature Conservation, the Outdoor Council, agriculture, as well as several local institutions, associations, and museums, and was submitted to the Minister for the Environment on March 3, 2014. The park was officially created on April 27, 2015.

The park contains remnants of human civilization from various periods, such as the Bronze Age, Iron Age, and Viking Age. In various places, burial mounds, as well as remains of ships, jewelry, and weapons can be found. The national park showcases people's interactions with nature from different eras, such as ancient forestry and agricultural practices. Roskilde is of historical importance to the royal family.

== Landscape and Nature ==
The park is characterized by very diverse landscapes, which are connected like a mosaic. Besides the Roskilde Fjord, there are islands and islets, salt marshes and salt marshes, rocks, meadows, reed beds, marshes, arable land, forests, lakes, streams, and urban landscapes. The national park is a very important breeding and resting area for waterfowl. The park also includes the former royal forests of Bidstrup. About 60% of the park is protected.

Both the water and the forests are rich in plant and animal species. The forests derive their biodiversity from the calcareous soil and the terrain. The forests contain very old trees, such as an oak whose age is estimated to be 1000 years. In some places in the park, peat moss can be found that stretches out in huge carpets. Noteworthy is the rare plant species from the genus Vincetoxicum. This plant was traditionally used as a medicine against venomous bites from animals and against infectious diseases though it is known to be toxic to humans today.

Lots of animals live inside the park. Hazel dormouse live inside the forests. Another special feature of the park is the sea eagles, which have an abundance of food in the form of fish and waterfowl. New eagle chicks are born every year. In spring and summer, the approximately twelve white-tailed eagles are clearly visible, as well as how they catch fish or birds. A special phenomenon in the park is the so-called black moon, when thousands of tufted ducks fly together.

== See also ==
- List of national parks of Denmark
