= Kongernes Nordsjælland =

National park in Zealand, Denmark

Kongernes Nordsjælland National Park
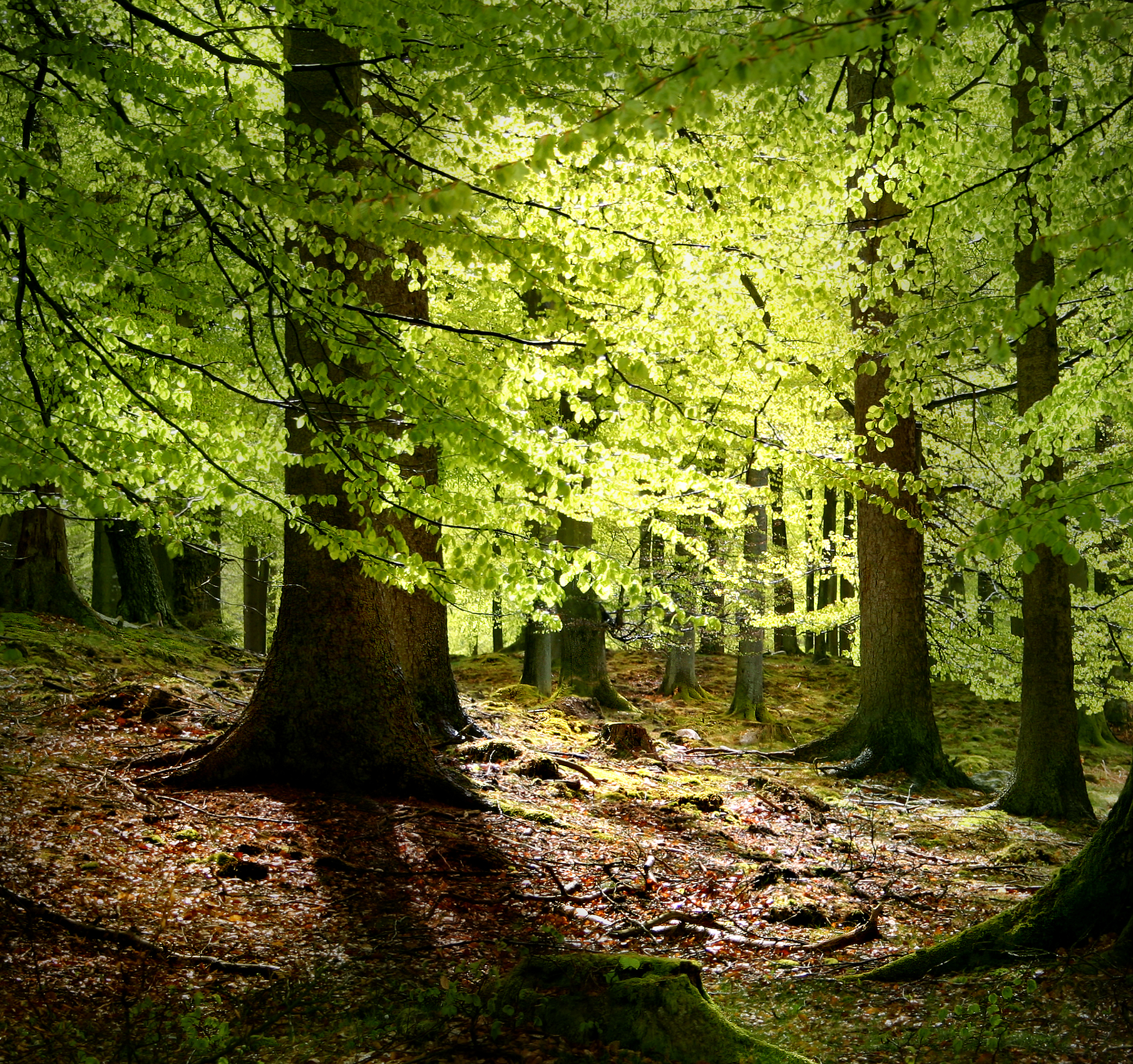
- Gribskov in the National Park

- Location within Denmark
- Location: North Zealand, Denmark
- Coordinates: 56.00°N 12.20°E
- Area: 262.5 km^{2} (101.4 sq mi)
- Established: 2018
- Governing body: Danish Ministry of the Environment
- Website: Kongernes Nordsjælland National Park

Kongernes Nordsjælland (Royal North Zealand) is a national park in the northern region of the island of Zealand, Denmark. It opened in 2018.

== Description ==
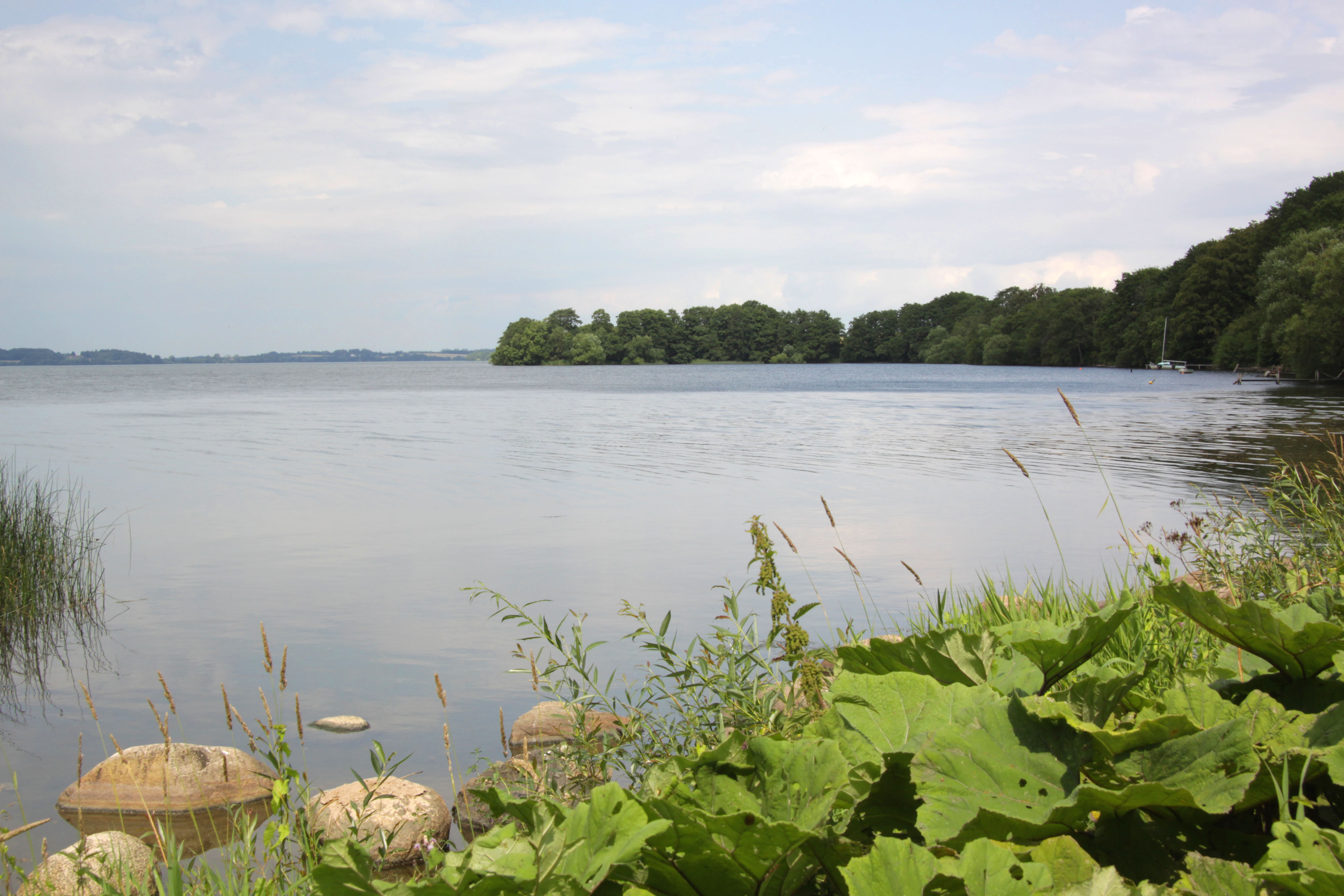
There are several lakes in the national park, including Esrum (largest in Denmark by water volume, depicted) and Arresø (largest by surface area)

Kongernes Nordsjælland cover 26,250 hectares (64,900 acres) with the forest of Gribskov and the lake of Esrum Sø at its core. Gribskov is one of Denmark's largest forests, with centuries old oak trees, rich fauna and flora, prehistoric sites and opportunities for hiking and cycling. Esrum Sø, the second largest lake in the country, is noted for its clean waters, its recreational facilities and the 12th-century monastery of Esrum Abbey at its northern end. The park also includes the lakes of Arresø and Gurresø, the woodland of Tisvilde Hegn and will comprise a connected cultural and natural landscape of coast, heath, forest and rural areas. Arresø is the largest lake in Denmark by area and Tisvilde Hegn is the oldest plantation in the country. The designated area has a large concentration of historically significant relics spanning the Stone Age to present times. This includes dolmens, tumuli, medieval ruins, castles and royal palaces.

Most of the park is designated as Natura 2000. Several species of deer can be seen throughout the area as well as red foxes and badgers. There is also a rich bird life in the woods with buzzards, black woodpeckers, osprey, owls, and white tailed eagles. The heathland attracts greylag geese and northern lapwings while common kingfisher, white-throated dipper and common goldeneye ducks can be seen around the lakes.

== Approval ==
Map of North Zealand showing the sections and extent of the national park.

In November 2014, the national broadcasting corporation of Danmarks Radio reported that Kim Valentin, mayor of Gribskov Municipality, believed the national park would soon be approved by the Danish Ministry of the Environment.

Minister of the Environment Kirsten Brosbøl was handed the proposal for the national park on 12. December 2014. Following the 18 June 2015 elections, Denmark had a new government and the Ministry of the Environment was merged with the Ministry of Food, Agriculture and Fisheries of Denmark (now Ministry of the Environment and Food). The new minister is Eva Kjer Hansen.

== See also ==
- List of national parks of Denmark
- North Zealand
- Par force hunting landscape in North Zealand

== Sources ==
- The Parforce Hunting landscape in North Zealand UNESCO
- Danmarks Nationalparker: Publications and maps. Proposals on the extent of Kongernes Nordsjælland. With maps and guides. (in Danish)
