= Christine Daugaard =

Danish writer and poet (1831–1917)

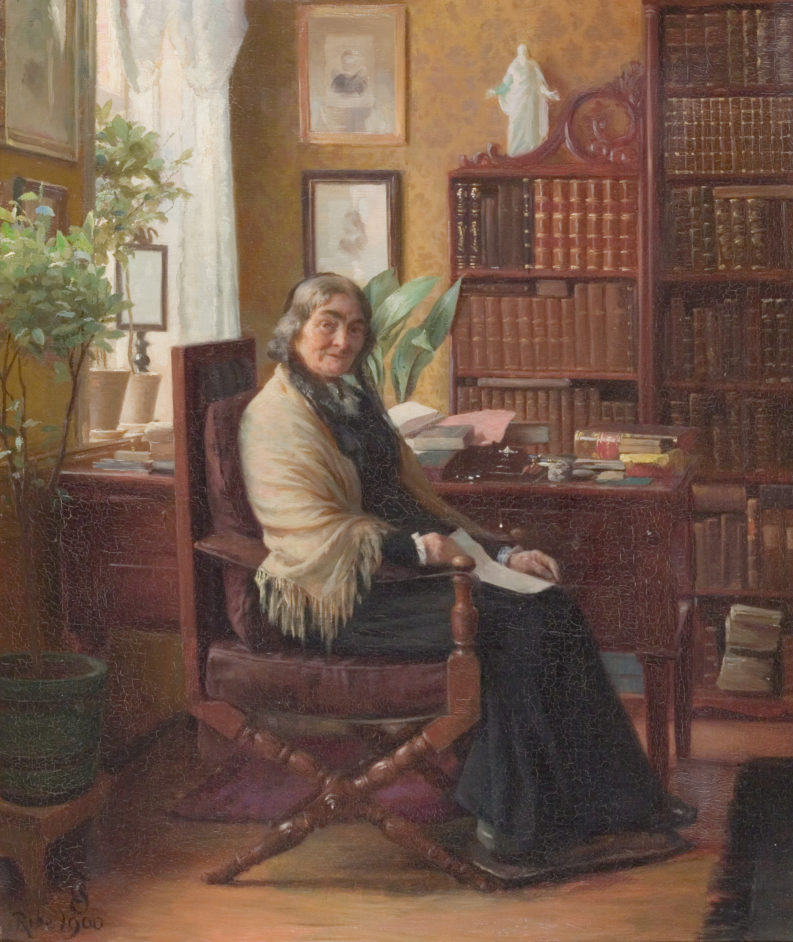
- Christine in 1900, by Carl Thomsen, now in a collection at Ribe Kunstmuseum
- Born: 30 January 1831; Thorstrup Parish, Varde, Denmark
- Died: 18 December 1917 (aged 86); Ribe, Jutland, Denmark
- Occupation(s): Writer, poet, translator

Christine Margaretha Daugaard (30 January 1831 in Thorstrup by Varde – 18 December 1917 in Ribe) was a Danish writer and poet, daughter of bishop Jacob Brøgger Daugaard.

== Biography ==
Christine Daugaard was born in Denmark to bishop Jacob Brøgger Daugaard. Daugaard loved the Jutland Hede. In 1845 her father became diocesan provost and, in 1850, bishop in Ribe, and Daugaard now spent some years in Ribe. Her father nurtured a keen sense of history, and Daugaard inherited a historical interest from him. After the bishop's death in 1867, she moved with her mother to Copenhagen, where they lived for about a dozen years in a villa on H. C. Ørsteds Vej. Daugaard had earlier befriended Sophie Holst, a Jewish priest's daughter, who was accepted as a daughter in the bishop's house. She accompanied Daugaard to Copenhagen after the bishop's death, and went with her friend to Jutland (1861), first to the Herregaarden Nørholm by Varde, where they lived for a time, at the suggestion of Miss Rosenørn-Teilmann, and then again to Ribe, where she died in 1917.

Belonging to a gifted and literary family, she began publishing work in the 1850s and 1860s, partly under the pseudonym Erica, with several spiritual and fatherlands historical poems (among others Heather Flowers 1856, Historical Poems 1861, Danmarks Fadervor 1864, Spiritual Poems 1865, The Guardian 1870). She also published in 1884 an abridged translation of Torquato Tasso's Liberated Jerusalem.

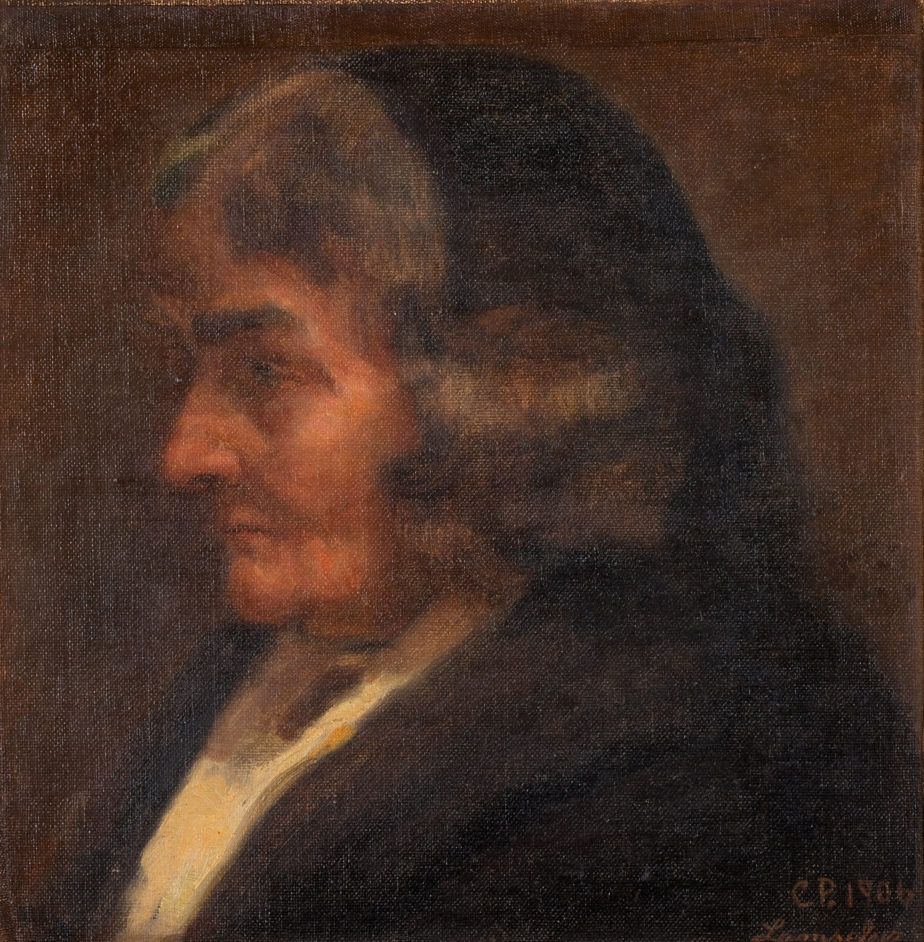
Christine in 1906, by Caja Prytz

Daugaard died in 1917 aged 86.
