= Vibeke Jensdatter =

Danish merchant and landowner (1638–1709)

- Born: 17 October 1638; Varde, Denmark
- Died: 17 October 1709 (aged 71); Ribe, Denmark
- Occupation(s): Merchant, landowner
- Spouse: Laurids Christensen Friis (m. 1656; died 1659)

Vibeke Jensdatter (17 October 1638 – 17 October 1709) was a Danish merchant and landowner. She was one of the most successful business people in Denmark in her time.

== Life ==
Vibeke Jensdatter was born on 17 October 1638 in Varde to city manager Jens Nielsen (died 1659) and Maren Jensdatter. In 1656, when she was 18, she married city manager and beef merchant Laurids Christensen Friis (1619–1659) of Ribe. Three years later, her husband died of the plague and she was left to raise two daughters and a stepdaughter. Seven months after her husband's death, she gave birth to his posthumous son. Jensdatter took over her husband's beef exporting business on a smaller scale for four years and became one of only two women of to manage a seaborne business from Ribe. Jensdatter also exported lead. She retired from the exporting business in 1664 and lived off her accumulated wealth. By the time of her retirement, she was the fourth biggest property owner in Ribe with four houses and a dozen rental stalls.

In 1678, she bought farmland from her mother. In 1686, she acquired the Vardho estate by placing its former owner, Vibeke Pallesdatter Rosenkrantz (died 1708), in debtor's prison. Rosenkrantz had failed to repay a loan of 3,000 rigsdaler to Jensdatter, and the Vardho estate served as collateral for the loan. Vibeke Pallesdatter Rosenkrantz was the widow of nobleman Erik Krag (1620–1672) and the mother of Baron Frederik Krag (1655–1728). Rosenkrantz wrote to Jensdatter from prison, begging to be imprisoned on her farm instead, and complaining that she was unable to have communion or have access to a church. Jensdatter replied to her that only when the debt was repaid would she be released from prison.

Jensdatter died on her 71st birthday in Ribe in 1709. Her son-in-law Peder Terpager inherited the Vardho estate after her death.
