= Wadden Sea National Park, Denmark =

National park in Denmark

Wadden Sea National Park
- Nationalpark Vadehavet
- Wadden Sea
- Interactive map of Wadden Sea National Park
- Location: The Danish part of the Wadden Sea, Denmark
- Coordinates: 55.25°N 8.483°E
- Area: 1,466 km^{2} (566 sq mi)
- Established: 16 October 2010 (named 17 January 2008)
- Governing body: Danish Ministry of the Environment
- Website: eng.nationalparkvadehavet.dk

Ramsar Wetland
- Official name: Vadehavet
- Designated: 14 May 1987
- Reference no.: 356

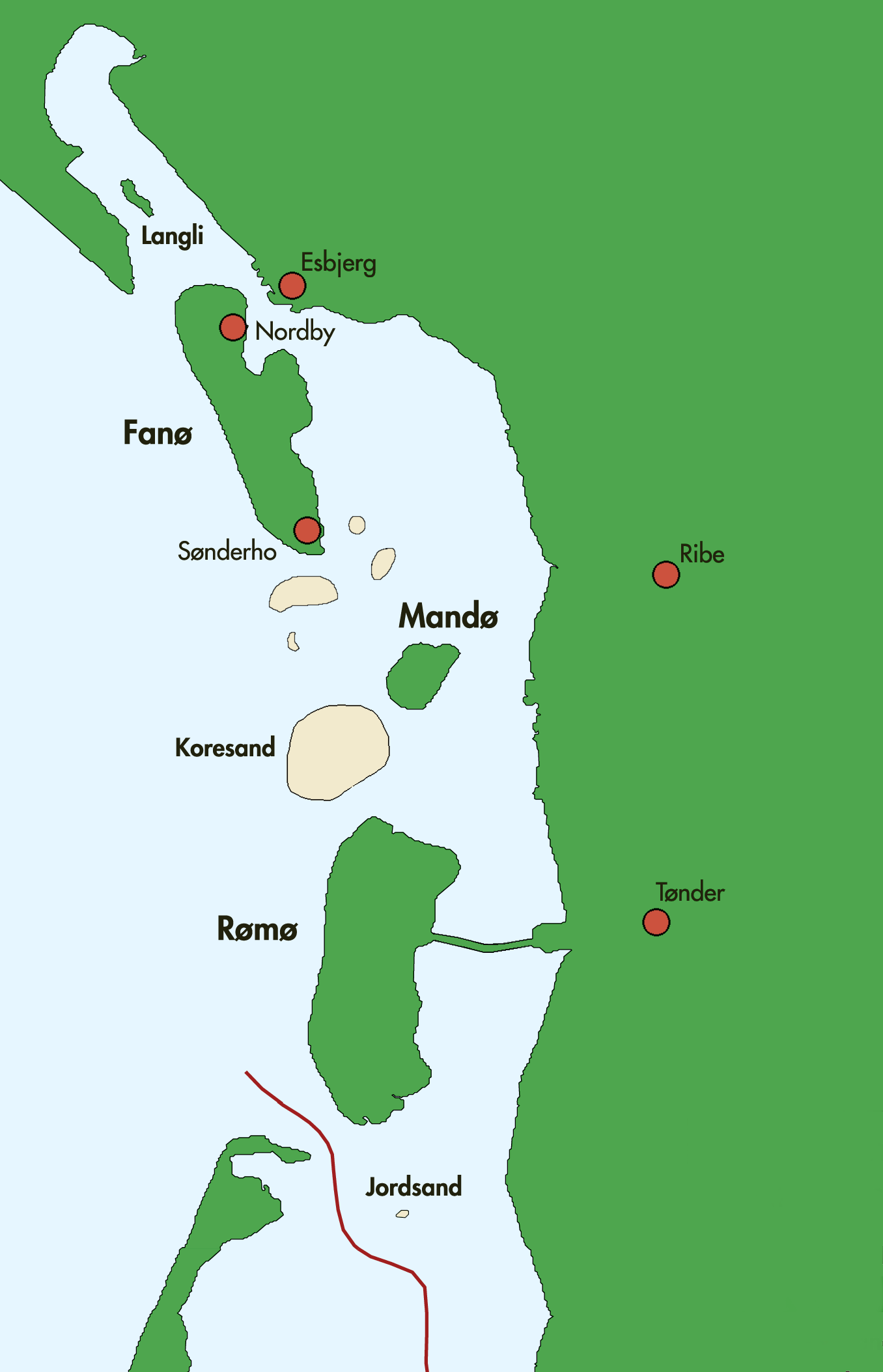
Danish islands in the Wadden Sea

Wadden Sea National Park (Nationalpark Vadehavet) was designated a Danish national park on 17 January 2008, effective 2010. The Wadden Sea National Park is by far the largest of Denmark's national parks outside of Greenland and covers the Danish part of the Wadden Sea from Ho Bugt to the German border, and includes the islands of Fanø, Mandø and Rømø, as well as Skallingen, the Varde Å valley, and many of the marshlands of Tjæreborgmarsken, Ribemarsken, Margrethekogen and De Ydre Diger in Tøndermarsken.

The Wadden Sea is internationally known as a resting place for millions of migratory birds, and more than 10 million of them pass through the Wadden Sea twice a year. Large flocks of European starlings can be found which fly in formations known as the sort sol. The Wadden Sea also has large numbers of breeding birds, fish, and invertebrates such as starfish and blue mussels. It provides habitat for more than 500 species of plants and animals. Because of its unique biodiversity and intact intertidal ecosystem, since 2014 it has constituted the Danish part of the Wadden Sea World Heritage Site. Prince Joachim of Denmark is Patron of the Wadden Sea Centre.

97% of the national park is part of Natura 2000, divided into several areas: a bird sanctuary, a wildlife sanctuary, and Ramsar wetlands of international importance. The areas comprise biomes like the low-lying flat coast, tidal channels, tidal flats, stream mouths, beach meadows, sandplains and dunes.

== Motivation ==
The official motivation behind Wadden Sea National Park (Denmark) was to strengthen:

- Nature protection
- Cultural history
- Outdoor activities
- Education and research
- International cooperation

== See also ==
- List of national parks of Denmark
- Wadden Sea National Parks
- The Wadden Sea Centre
- Marsk Tower
