= Ribe Katedralskole =

Coordinates: 55°19′35.07″N 8°45′37.56″E

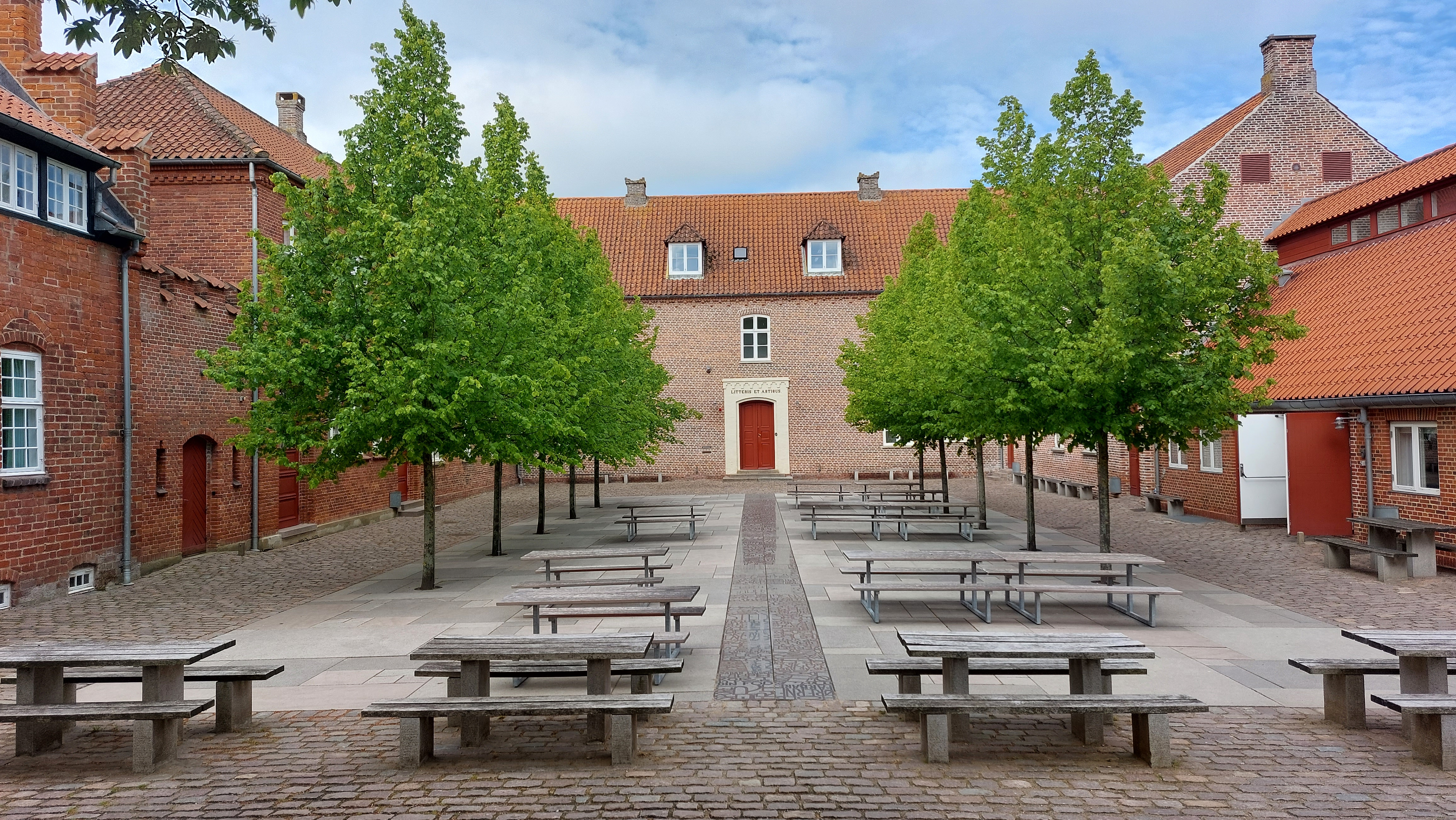

Location
- Puggaardsgade 22, 6760; Ribe; Denmark

Information
- School type: Gymnasium; Private high school
- Motto: Latin: Litteris et artibus (Literature and [the] Arts)
- Denomination: Church of Denmark
- Established: c. 1145
- President: Bishop Elisabeth Dons Christensen
- Rector: Kristian Bennike
- Gender: Coeducational
- Affiliations: Ribe Cathedral
- Website: http://www.ribekatedralskole.dk/

Ribe Katedralskole is a cathedral school in the town of Ribe, Denmark. The school was first mentioned in 1145, making it one of the oldest schools in the world. The oldest building still in use, Puggård, is from the fourteenth century. Except for churches, this is the oldest Scandinavian building still used for its original purpose.

Today the school is an independent school functioning as a modern high school (Danish: Gymnasium og HFkursus).

== Famous alumni ==
Famous Alumni	Year	Occupation
Peder Palladius		Bishop, Author
Hans Thomesen	1550	Hymn writer
Anders Sørensen Vedel	1561	Author, Historian
Anders Bording	1637	Editor
H. A. Brorson	1712	Danish Pietist clergyman and Hymn writer.
Henning Frederik Feilberg	1849	Author, Folklorist
Eugenius Warming	1859	Botanist
Jacob A. Riis	Did not graduate	Journalist, pioneer of American photojournalism
Jørgen Pedersen Gram	1868	Mathematician, forsikringsmand
Hans Brix	1887	Author, Critic, Professor
Hans Edvard Nørregård-Nielsen	1965	Author, mag.art, Director
Holger K. Nielsen	1969	Politician
Per Vers	?	Rapper
Henrik Dahl	1978	Author, Sociologist
Rune Engelbreth Larsen	1986	Author, Politician
Katrine Winkel Holm	1989	Theologian, Debater, Boardmember of Danmarks Radio
