= Ribe Kunstmuseum =

Coordinates: 55.329218°N 8.767522°E

Ribe Art Museum
- Ribe Kunstmuseum
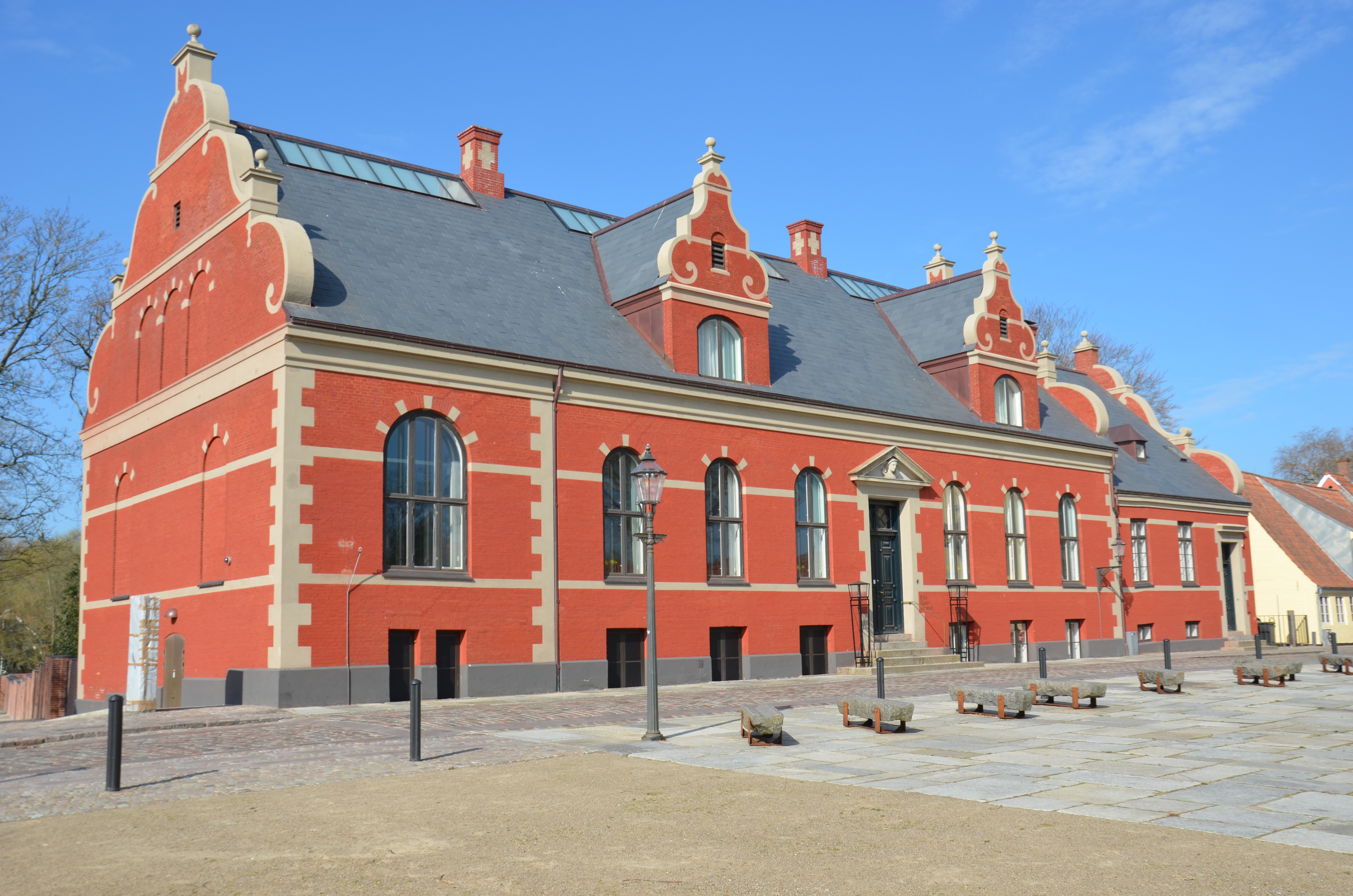
- Established: 1891; 134 years ago
- Location: Sct. Nicolaj Gade 10, 6760 Ribe
- Type: Art Museum
- Website: ribekunstmuseum.dk

Ribe Kunstmuseum is an art museum in Ribe, Denmark.

== History ==
Ribe Kunstmuseum was inaugurated in 1891. The museum is located in a villa which was formerly the private residence of factory owner Balthazar Giørtz (1827–1891). The villa built between 1860–1864 after drawings made by the architect and royal surveyor Laurits Albert Winstrup (1815–1889).

The museum's main building and the octagonal gazebo together with the garden and front yard were restored and partially modernized during the years 2009–2010. The newly renovated museum was inaugurated November 26, 2010.

== Collection ==
The collections show the main line of Danish pictorial art from c. 1750 to 1940 including works by

- Jens Juel
- C. W. Eckersberg
- Christen Købke
- Kristian Zahrtmann
- L. A. Ring
- P. S. Krøyer
- Anna Ancher
- Michael Ancher
- William Scharff
- Christine Daugaard

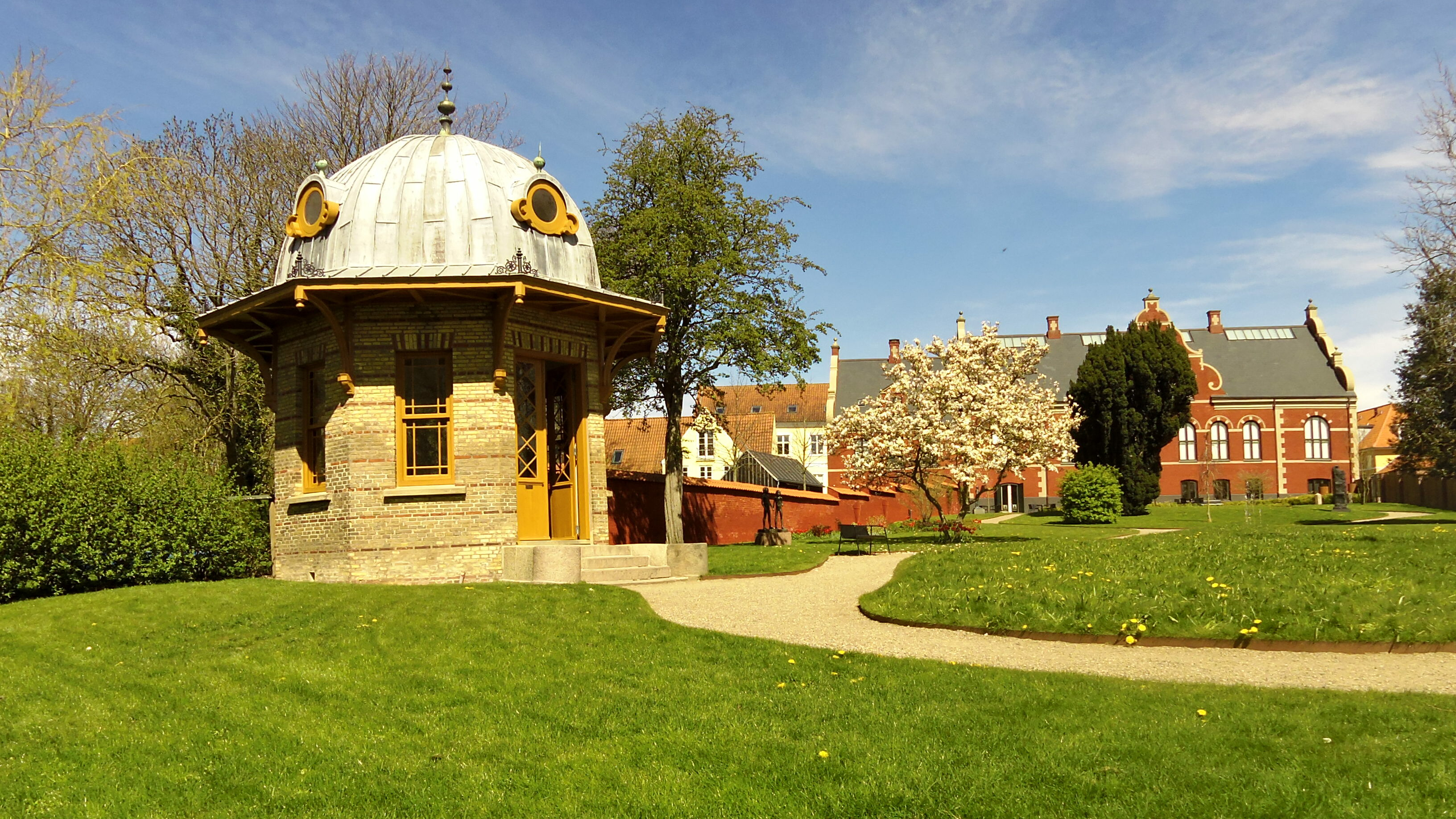
Octagonal gazebo in the park behind the museum
