= Bramming Municipality =

Former municipality in Denmark

Coordinates: 55°28′N 8°42′E

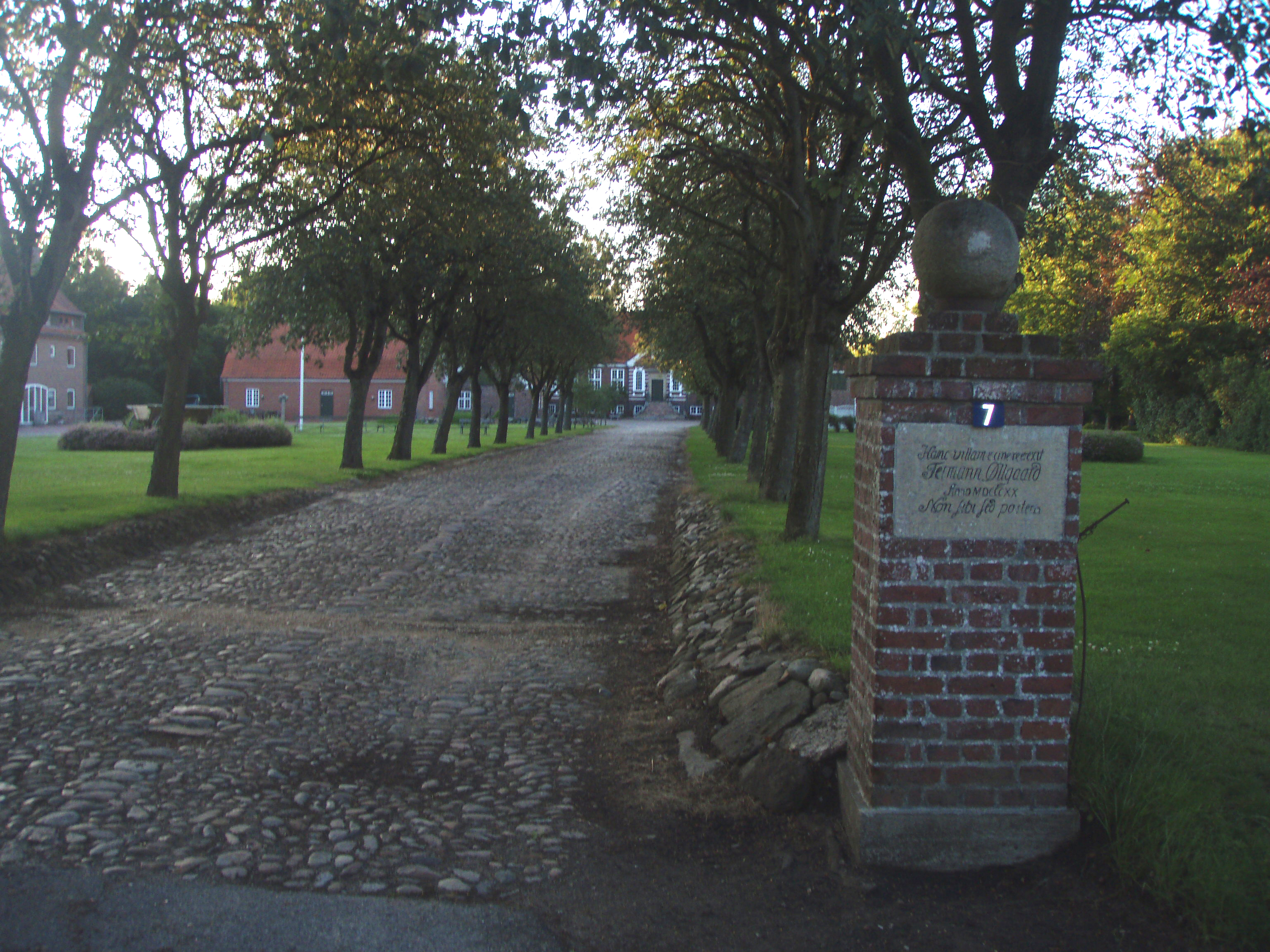
Bramming Manor, 2011

Until 1 January 2007 Bramming Municipality was a municipality (Danish: kommune) in Ribe County on the west coast of the Jutland peninsula in southwest Denmark. The municipality covered an area of 170 km^{2}, and had a total population of 13,638 (2005). Its last mayor was Karl Kristian Knudtzen, a member of the Venstre (Liberal Party) political party. The main town and the site of its municipal council was the town of Bramming.

Bramming municipality ceased to exist as the result of the Municipal Reform of 2007 (Kommunalreformen). It was merged with the former Ribe and Esbjerg municipalities to form the new Esbjerg Municipality. This created a municipality with an area of 741 km^{2} and a total population of 114,097 (2005). The new municipality belongs to the Region of Southern Denmark (Region Syddanmark).

== Notable people ==
- John Lauridsen (born 1959) a retired Danish professional footballer who played as an attacking midfielder, played 27 times for Denmark. After his football career he settled in Bramming
- Anders Dreyer (born 1998) professional footballer for St Mirren.
