= Ribe County =

Coordinates: 55°22′52″N 10°26′07″E

Ribe County Ribe Amt (Danish)
- County of Denmark
- Coat of arms

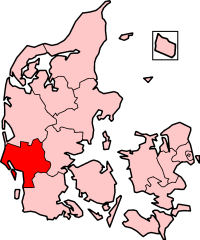
- Ribe County in Denmark
- Seat: Ribe

Area
  - Total: 3,132 km^{2} (1,209 sq mi)

Population (2006)
  - Total: 224,261
  - Density: 71.60/km^{2} (185.5/sq mi)

Ribe County (Danish: Ribe Amt) is a former county (Danish: amt) on the Jutland peninsula of southwest Denmark. It included Denmark's fifth largest city, Esbjerg. The county was abolished effective January 1, 2007, when it merged into Region of Southern Denmark (i.e. Region South Denmark). It was often considered coterminous with South West Jutland (Danish: Sydvestjylland).

== List of County Mayors ==
| From | To | County Mayor |
|---|---|---|
| April 1, 1970 | November 15, 1972 | Kaj Knudsen (Venstre) |
| 1972 | 1989 | Frode Madsen (Venstre) |
| 1990 | 1993 | Poul Erling Christensen (Conservative) |
| 1994 | December 31, 2006 | Laurits Tørnæs (Venstre) |

== Municipalities (1970-2006) ==
- Billund
- Blaabjerg
- Blåvandshuk
- Bramming
- Brørup
- Esbjerg
- Fanø
- Grindsted
- Helle
- Holsted
- Ribe
- Varde
- Vejen
- Ølgod
