= Per Vers =

Danish rapper (born 1976)

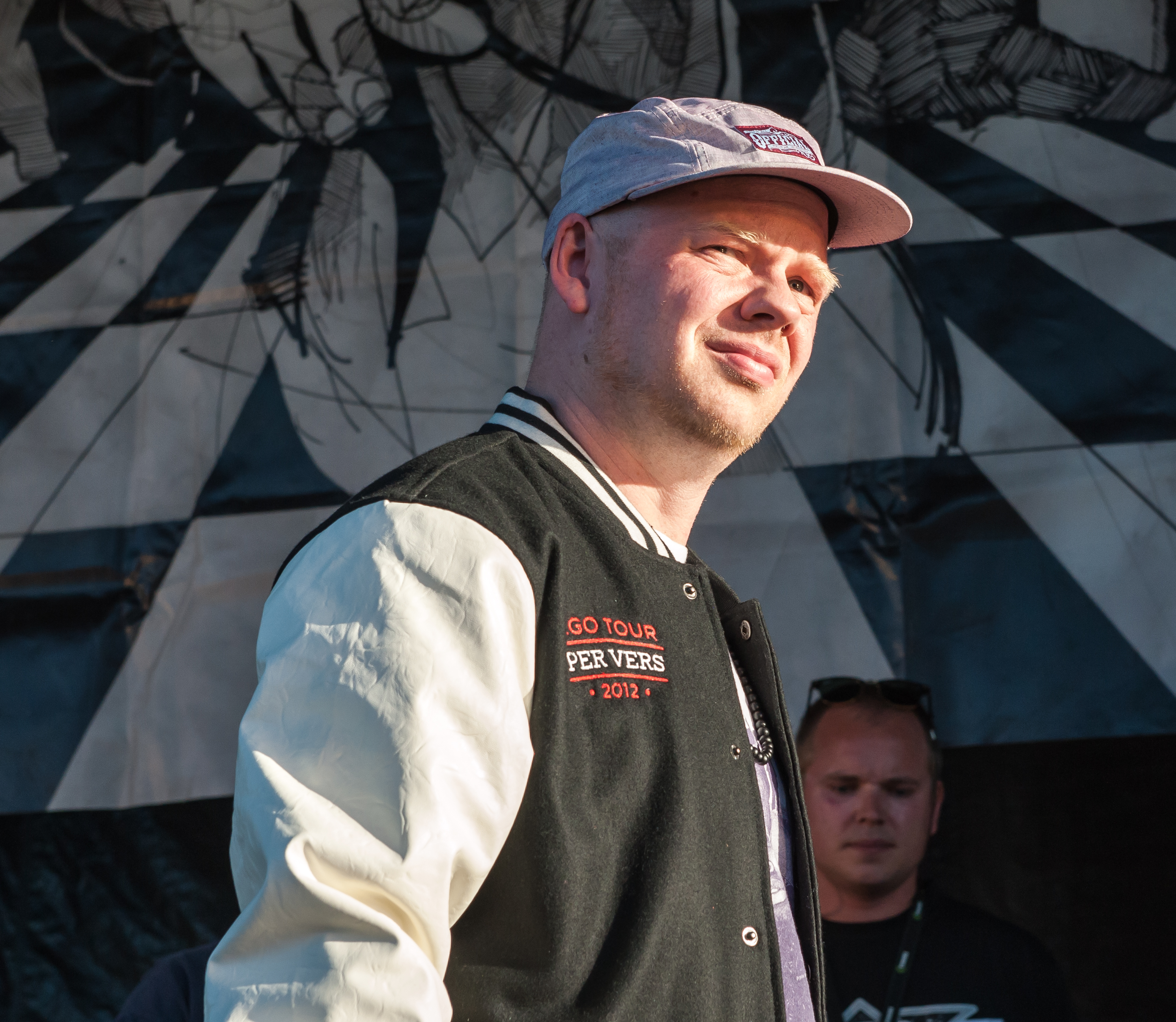

Background information
- Also known as: Per V
- Born: Per Uldal; 1976 (age 49–50); Gram, Denmark
- Genres: Hip hop, Rap
- Years active: 1991 – present
- Label: Mixed Ape Music
- Member of: Kinski
- Website: per.tv

Per Uldal, better known by the stage name Per Vers or at times just Per V (born in 1976 in Gram in Denmark) is a Danish rapper, songwriter and performer.

Per Vers started rapping in 1991 appearing in the finals of rap fight held in Jylland. In 1993, he won the freestyle competition against MC Clemens and the late Preacherman, resulting in a long feud between Per Vers and Danish rapper MC Clemens. From 1992 to 1994, he cooperated with DJ Møller producer Langemand forming the rap group Sund Fornuft. After the band's break-up, Per Vers worked as a solo act, winning the MC's Fight Night twice in 2000 and 2001 and later on served as judge in the same competition.

Releasing many mixtape collections, his first album Vers 1.0. He also toured with various artists like DJ Noize, Nappion, Luco, DJ Static and Ayoe Angelica. In 2008, he formed Kinski, a rap / spoken word formation with spoken word artist Ole Omkvæd and producer Turkman Souljah releasing the album Vi Taler dansk on Per Vers' own label Mixed Ape Music.

His more recent releases include Ego and DNA, the latter a big commercial success reaching number 2 on Tracklisten, the official Danish Albums Chart. He also formed MissionCrew in cooperation with Nappion and Ayoe Angelica. In 2013, he released his short film A Tribute to J.J. Abrams that he co-wrote and acted in.

Per Vers' album cover for the 2011 album Ego has been famously adapted by Lady Gaga in her video release for her 2014 release "G.U.Y." both inspired by the work "Yellow" by Lego-brick artist Nathan Sawaya.

== Discography ==
=== Albums ===
Year	Album	Peak positions	Certification
Year	Album	DEN	Certification
2005	Vers 1.0	–	
2011	Ego	14	
2014	DNA	2	
2018	Knust Kunst	37	
2021	45 omdrejninger	35	

Live

- 2012: Live @ Smukfest 2012 EP

Others

- 2005: Re:Vers (limited edition)

=== Singles ===
- 2011: "Ironman"
- 2014: "Dum"

== Filmography ==
- 2005: Det vildeste westen (Danish TV series)
- 2013: A Tribute to J.J. Abrams (short, co-writing and acting)
