= Tiger milk =

Tiger milk is the milk given by mother tigresses (female tigers) to their young.

Tiger milk may also refer to:

== Food and drink ==
- Tiger milk mushroom (Lignosus rhinocerus), a fungus found in tropical rainforests
- Leche de tigre, the marinade in a ceviche
- White tiger's milk, an English alcoholic beverage
- Tiger's Milk (nutrition bar), a nutrition bar created and introduced in the 1960s and discontinued in 2022
- Tiger nut drink, a Nigerian plant milk beverage made with tiger nut
- Horchata de chufa, a Spanish plant milk beverage made with tiger nut

== Arts, entertainment, and media ==
- Tigermilk, 1996 album from Scottish pop group Belle and Sebastian
- Tigermilk (musical project), the solo project of Chilean singer-songwriter Paulina "Kuky" Tala
