= Alcoholic drinks in Canada =

Map of drinking age per province Minimum age is 19 Minimum age is 18

This article covers various topics involving alcoholic drinks in Canada. The Government of Canada defines an alcoholic drink as "a beverage containing 1.1% or more alcohol by volume."

== History ==
=== Beer ===
Beer was first introduced to Canada by European settlers in the seventeenth century, as Canada had an ideal climate for making beer before refrigeration was introduced. However, the preferred drink of the citizens of New France was imported wine or brandy. Although the first commercial brewery was built by Louis Prud'homme in Montreal (then Fort Ville-Marie) in 1650, it failed. Jean Talon, the first appointed Intendant of New France put limits on the amount of wine and spirits that could be imported and established the La brasserie de Roy in Quebec City, in the year 1668. This brewery also failed after Talon returned to France in 1672 and import limits were increased. What instead sprung up was the development of spruce beer, both alcoholic and non-alcoholic.

=== Whisky ===
Canadian whisky is a type of whisky produced in Canada. Most Canadian whiskies are blended whiskies consisting of a mix of different whisky styles, and are typically lighter and smoother than other whisky styles. While most Canadian whiskies are based predominantly on corn-based whiskies, Canadian distillers have long included rye-based whisky for flavour; in Canadian law the terms Canadian whisky and rye whisky are interchangeable to refer to the same product, even when it is made with only a small amount of rye spirits.

=== Wine ===
Canadian wine has been produced for over 400 years. In 1611, Louis Hérbert planted a hillside vineyard near what is today, Bear River, Nova Scotia. He and other settlers tried to cultivate Vitis vinifera grapes from Europe with limited success. They found it necessary to focus on the native species of Vitis labrusca and Vitis riparia along with various hybrids. However, the market was limited for such wines because of their peculiar taste which was often called "foxy". However, this became less apparent when the juice was made into Port- and Sherry-styled wines. In 1866, the first commercial winery opened in Canada, situated on Pelee Island in Ontario.

=== Prohibition ===
Prohibition in Canada was a ban on alcoholic beverages that arose in various stages, from local municipal bans in the late 19th century (extending to the present in some cases), to provincial bans in the early 20th century, and national prohibition (a temporary wartime measure) from 1918 to 1920. The relatively large and powerful beer and alcohol manufacturing sector, and the huge working class that purchased their products, failed to convince any of the governments to reverse their stance on prohibition. Most provinces repealed their bans in the 1920s, though alcohol was illegal in Prince Edward Island from 1901 to 1948. By comparison, the Ontario Temperance Act was in effect from 1916 to 1927.

== Comparative consumption ==
Statistics Canada carries out surveys of alcoholic consumption in Canada, divided by territory/province. Average values for the country in 2006 are given in the bottom row of the table.

| | Wine | Rank | Beer | Rank | Spirits | Rank | Total | Rank↓ |
|---|---|---|---|---|---|---|---|---|
| Yukon | 18.3 | 1 | 90.6 | 3 | 13.8 | 1 | 12.7 | 1 |
| Northwest Territories | 8.1 | 7 | 55.2 | 5 | 10.8 | 2 | 9.2 | 2 |
| Alberta | 13.9 | 4 | 89.8 | 4 | 7.6 | 9 | 8.6 | 3 |
| Newfoundland and Labrador | 6.5 | 11 | 93.3 | 2 | 7.3 | 10 | 8.0 | 4 |
| British Columbia | 14.5 | 3 | 76.6 | 12 | 9.0 | 7 | 7.8 | 5 |
| Ontario | 11.8 | 5 | 84.3 | 6 | 8.8 | 8 | 7.8 | 6 |
| Quebec | 17.4 | 2 | 93.9 | 1 | 4.1 | 12 | 7.8 | 7 |
| Prince Edward Island | 7.4 | 10 | 78.9 | 9 | 9.7 | 3 | 7.5 | 8 |
| Nova Scotia | 8.0 | 8 | 79.5 | 8 | 9.1 | 5 | 7.5 | 9 |
| Manitoba | 8.0 | 9 | 76.8 | 10 | 9.4 | 4 | 7.4 | 10 |
| Saskatchewan | 5.0 | 12 | 76.8 | 11 | 9.1 | 6 | 7.0 | 11 |
| New Brunswick | 8.4 | 6 | 79.8 | 7 | 6.8 | 11 | 6.7 | 12 |
| Nunavut | Data unavailable | | | | | | | |
| Canada | 13.1 | | 85.6 | | 7.5 | | 7.8 | |
Values for wine, beer and spirits consumption are given in litres per person over 15, per annum. The total is expressed in litres of absolute alcohol.

== Distribution ==
Under the Constitution of Canada, responsibility for enacting laws and regulations regarding the sale and distribution of alcoholic drinks in Canada is the sole responsibility of the ten provinces. Canada's three territories have also been granted similar autonomy over these matters under the provisions of federal legislation.

This means that there is a separate agency (or agencies) in each province responsible for regulating the consumption of and, in all but one case, the sale of alcoholic drinks. Alberta is currently the only jurisdiction to have completely privatized its retail liquor industry (the AGLC maintains a monopoly over the wholesale distribution of wine, distilled spirits and imported beer — the distribution operation itself being contracted out to a private operator). Most of the other jurisdictions have maintained a total or near-total control over the sale of hard liquor while allowing limited privatisation of country-originated beer and wine sales.

== Legal issues ==
=== Age ===
In Canada, there is no federally defined age for legal alcohol purchase or consumption. Each province and territory is free to set its own drinking age. The legal ages for purchase are currently:

- 19 years of age in British Columbia, New Brunswick, Newfoundland and Labrador, Northwest Territories, Nova Scotia, Nunavut, Ontario, Prince Edward Island, Saskatchewan, and Yukon.
- 18 years of age in Alberta, Manitoba, and Quebec.

Most provinces of Canada enacted prohibition of alcohol sales, consumption and distribution between the years of 1910 and 1920, during Prohibition in Canada. After prohibition ended, provinces enacted minimum drinking ages of 20 or 21 years. In the early 70s, the age limits were lowered to either 18 or 19 years of age to align with the age of majority. Later, a few provinces and territories raised their age limit from 18 to 19 in the late 1970s and early 1980s.

=== Sales ===
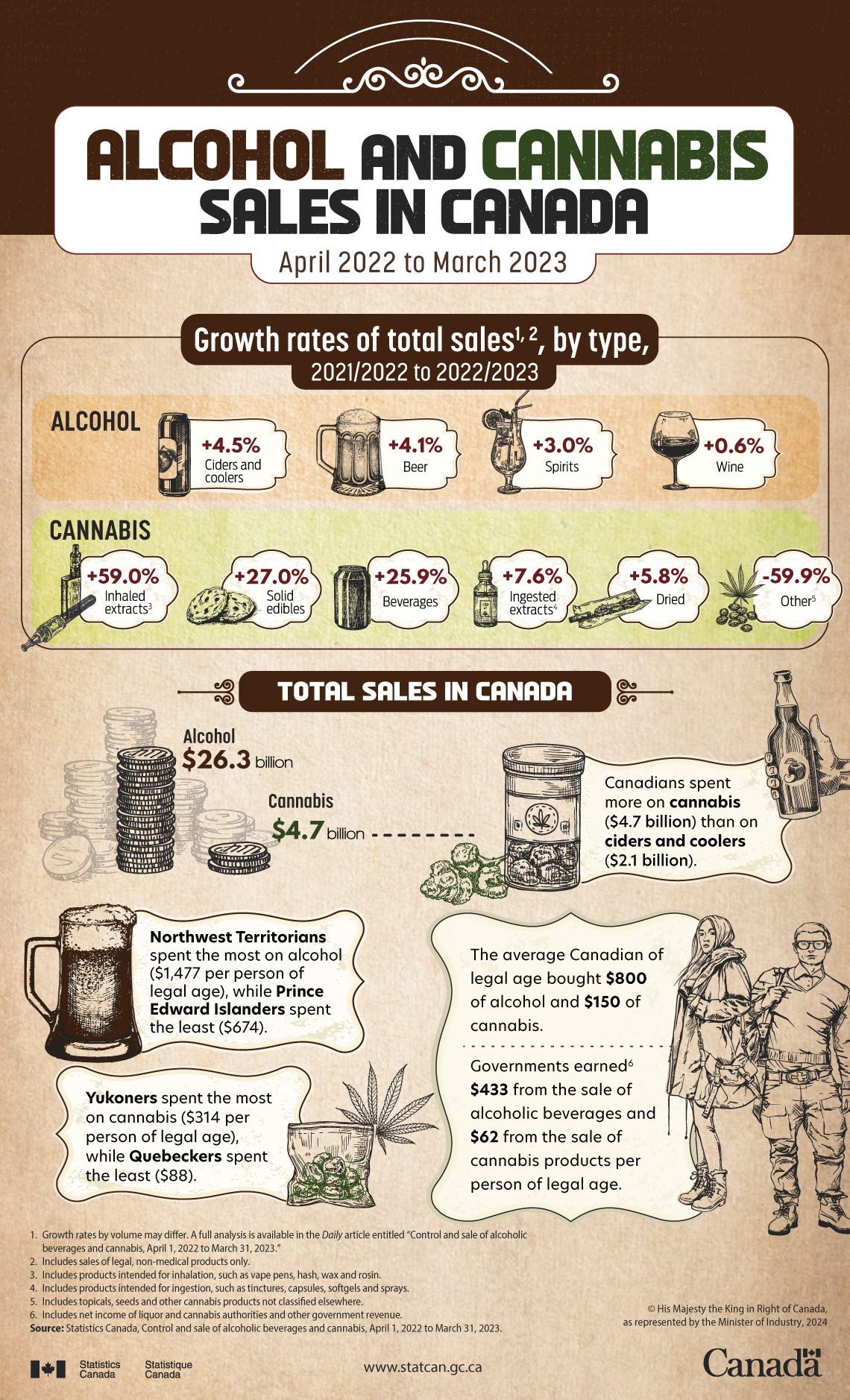
Alcohol and cannabis sales in Canada, April 2022 to March 2023

The selling hours of alcohol, both on and off-premises, are also appointed by provincial and territorial jurisdiction, as long as off-premises sale hours do not coincide with curfew hours. Many provinces and territories define the off-premises sale of hard liquor, either by alcohol volume or by quantities thereof, to be sold only within specific hours, which usually correspond to the opening hours of a given vendor. However, in some of them, it is also possible to derogate to the current norm upon applying for a distributor's licence, under certain circumstances. The on-premises sale is allowed at the discretion of the premise, with the hours being regulated by every province.

In general, most provinces have banned "tied houses" (bars that are affiliated with only one alcohol supplier), in favour of free houses which sell products from a variety of suppliers. A partial exception is made for brewpubs where a bar and brewery are on the same site.

=== Consumption ===
The consumption of alcohol in public places is generally forbidden, regardless of the time (in a few provinces and territories this is still not enforced), unless a permit to do so is delivered by the responsible municipal authorities. In Quebec the consumption of drinks with low alcohol contents is permitted in public if accompanied by food. In all of the provinces and territories, the consumption of alcohol is forbidden while driving, with Ontario and Quebec also forbidding the possession of open non-empty containers within a motionless vehicle. Police in Canada are known to show considerable discretion to public consumption based on the amount of public disruption.

== See also ==
- Alcoholic drink
- Caesar (cocktail)
- Caribou (drink)
- Legal drinking age
- Maple liqueur
- Moose milk (cocktail)
- Raymond Massey (cocktail)
- Queen Mary (beer cocktail)

== Notes ==
=== Sources ===
- Coutts, Ian (2010). Brew North: How Canadians Made Beer and Beer Made Canada. Vancouver: Greystone Books. ISBN 9781553654674.
