= Christiansborg Palace =

Palace in Copenhagen, seat of the Danish Parliament

- Christiansborg Slot
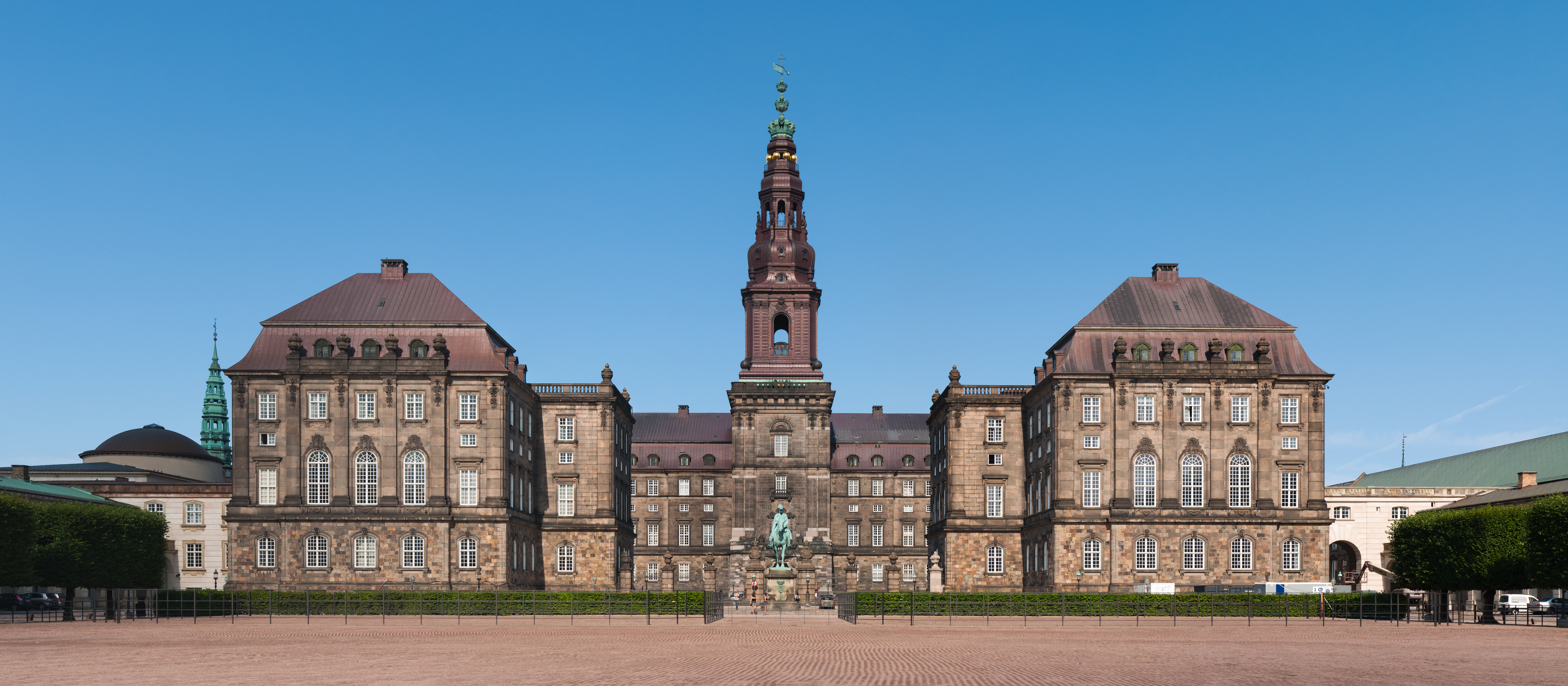
- Interactive map of the Christiansborg Palace area

General information
- Type: Palace
- Architectural style: Baroque, Neoclassicism, Neo-baroque
- Location: Copenhagen, Denmark
- Construction started: 1907
- Completed: 1928; 98 years ago
- Owner: (Denmark) Danish government

Design and construction
- Architects: Elias David Häusser, Christian Frederik Hansen, Thorvald Jørgensen

Christiansborg Palace (Danish: Christiansborg Slot, pronounced [kʰʁestjænsˈpɒˀ ˈslʌt, kʰʁæs-]) is a palace and government building on the islet of Slotsholmen in central Copenhagen, Denmark. It is the seat of the Danish Parliament (Folketinget), the Danish Prime Minister's Office, and the Supreme Court of Denmark. Also, several parts of the palace are used by the Danish monarch, including the Royal Reception Rooms, the Palace Chapel and the Royal Stables.

The palace is thus home to the three supreme powers: the executive power, the legislative power, and the judicial power. It is the only building in the world that houses all three of a country's branches of government. The name Christiansborg is thus also frequently used as a metonym for the Danish political system, and colloquially it is often referred to as Rigsborgen ('the castle of the realm') or simply Borgen ('the castle').

The present building, the third with this name, is the last in a series of successive castles and palaces constructed on the same site since the erection of the first castle in 1167. Since the early fifteenth century, the various buildings have served as the base of the central administration; until 1794 as the principal residence of the Danish kings and after 1849 as the seat of parliament.

The palace today bears witness to three eras of Danish architecture, as the result of two serious fires. The first fire occurred in 1794 and the second in 1884. The main part of the current palace, finished in 1928, is in the historicist Neo-baroque style. The chapel dates back to 1826 and is in a neoclassical style. The showgrounds were built from 1738 to 1746, in a baroque style.

Christiansborg Palace is owned by the Danish Government, and is run by the Palaces and Properties Agency. Several parts of the palace are open to the public.

== History ==
=== Absalon's Castle ===
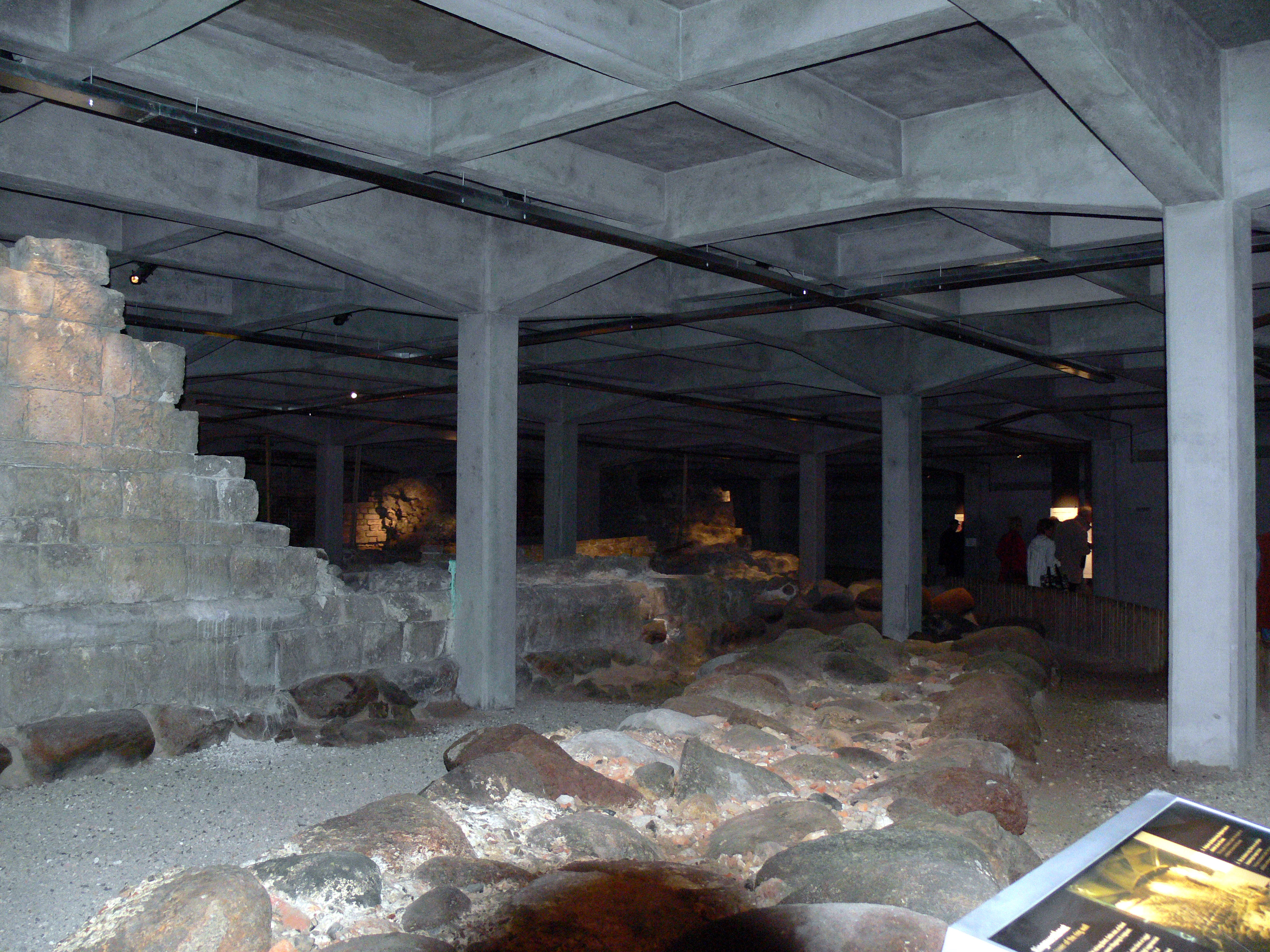
The underground excavations with the ruins of Absalon's Castle

The first castle on the site was Absalon's Castle, built in 1167 by the bishop Absalon. According to the Danish chronicler Saxo Grammaticus, Bishop Absalon of Roskilde built a castle in 1167 on a small island outside Copenhagen Harbour. The castle was made up by a curtain wall, encircling an enclosed courtyard with several buildings, such as the bishop's palace, a chapel and several minor buildings.

At the death of Absalon in 1201, possession of the castle and city of Copenhagen passed to the bishops of Roskilde. A few decades later, however, a bitter feud erupted between crown and church, and for almost two centuries the ownership of the castle and city was contested between kings and bishops. Furthermore, the castle was frequently under attack, for example by Wend pirates and the Hanseatic cities, and during the years 1249 to 1259 it was occupied and plundered.

In 1370, King Valdemar IV of Denmark was defeated in a conflict with the Hanseatic League, who ordered the castle to be demolished. They sent 40 stonemasons to demolish the castle stone by stone. The castle had long been a terrible nuisance to the Hanseatic cities' trade in the Sound, and the time had now come to remove it.

=== Copenhagen Castle ===
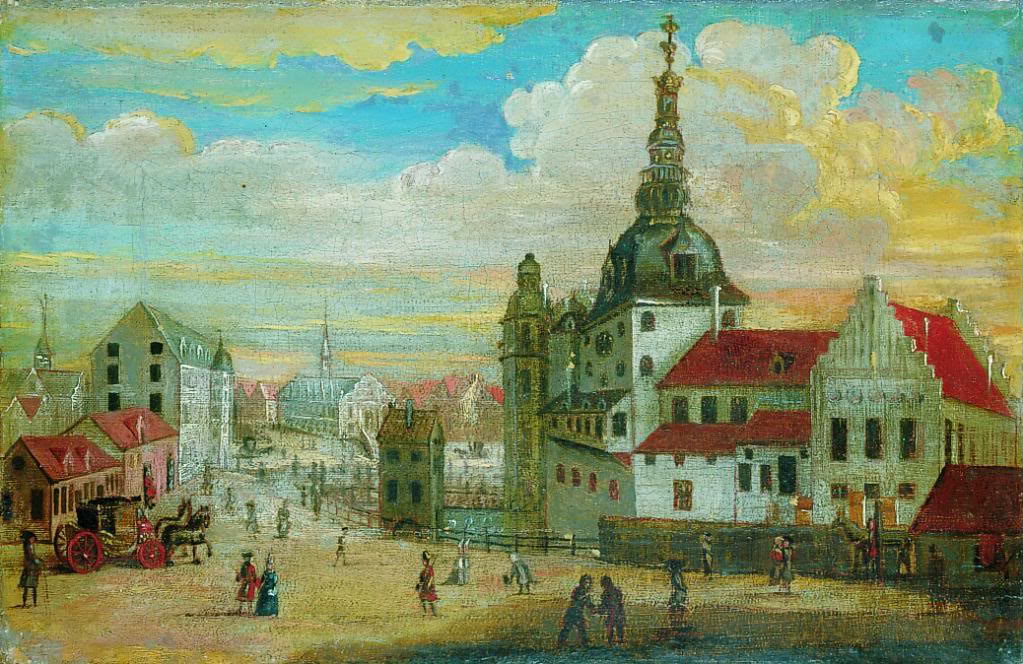
Copenhagen Castle in 1698

During the years after the demolition of Bishop Absalon's castle by the Hansa League in 1369, the ruins on the island were covered with earthworks, on which a new stronghold, Copenhagen Castle, was built. This was completed in the late 14th century. The castle had a curtain wall and was surrounded by a moat and with a large, solid tower as an entrance gate.

The castle was still the property of the Bishop of Roskilde until King Eric VII usurped the rights to the castle in 1417. From then on the castle in Copenhagen was occupied by the king. In the middle of the 15th century, the castle became the principal residence of the Danish kings and the centre of government.

The castle was rebuilt several times. In the 1720s, Frederick IV entirely rebuilt the castle, but it became so heavy that the walls began to give way and to crack. It became therefore evident to Christian VI, Frederik IV's successor, immediately after his accession to the throne in 1730, that an entirely new castle had to be built.

The demolition of the overextended and antiquated Copenhagen Castle was commenced in 1731 to make room for the first Christiansborg. The ruins of Absalon's castle and Copenhagen Castle were excavated at the start of the 20th century and can be seen today in the subterranean excavations under the present palace.

=== First Christiansborg ===
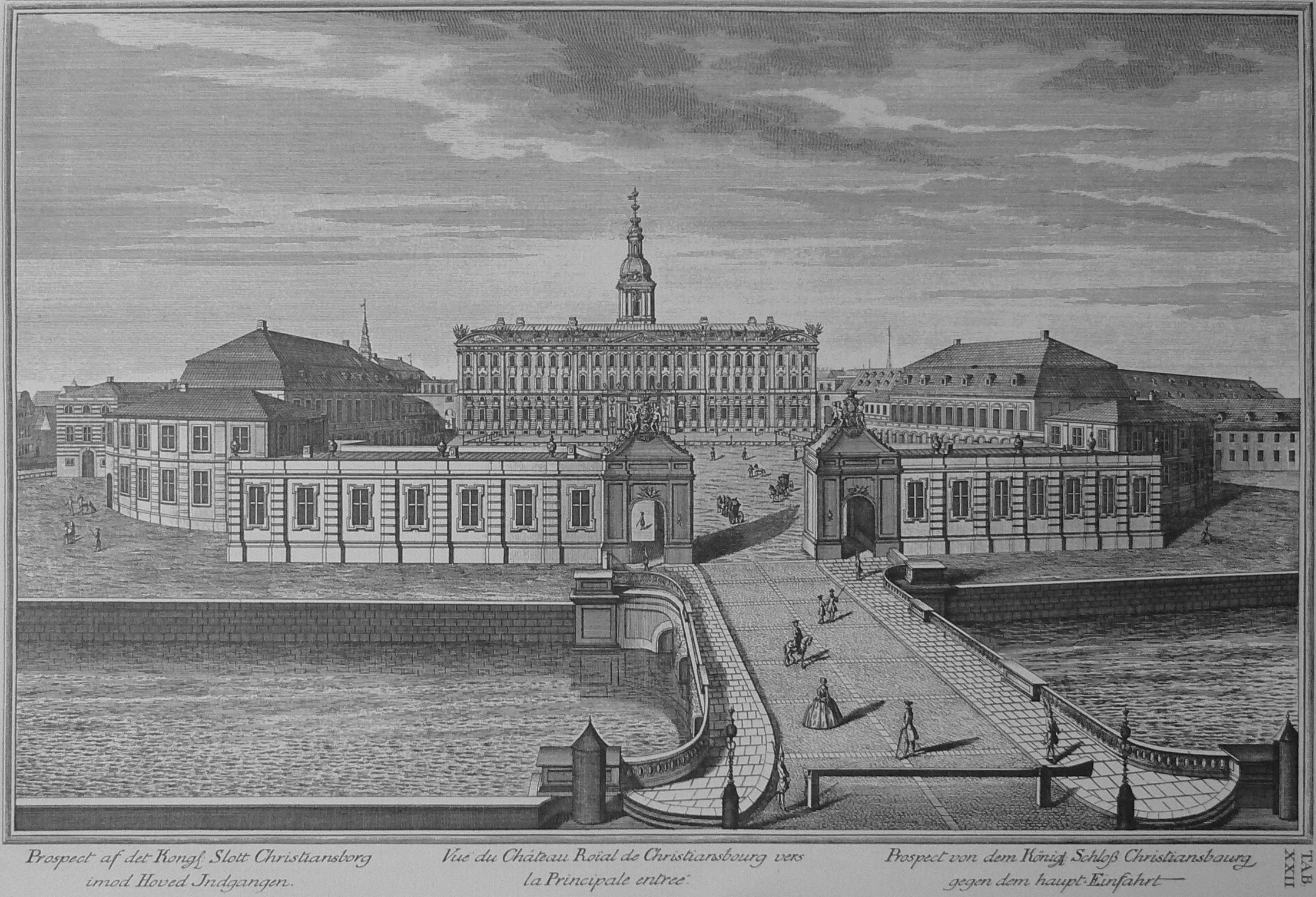
The first Christiansborg Palace in 1746

King Christian VI commissioned architect Elias David Häusser to build the first Christiansborg Palace (Danish, Christiansborg Slot), and in 1733 work started on a magnificent baroque palace. By 1738, work on the main palace had progressed so far that it was possible to start on the other buildings included in the total project. The palace included show grounds and chapel. Most of the palace complex was completed in 1745 and was the largest palace in northern Europe at the time.

The palace and church were ruined by a fire in 1794, but the showgrounds were saved.

=== Second Christiansborg ===
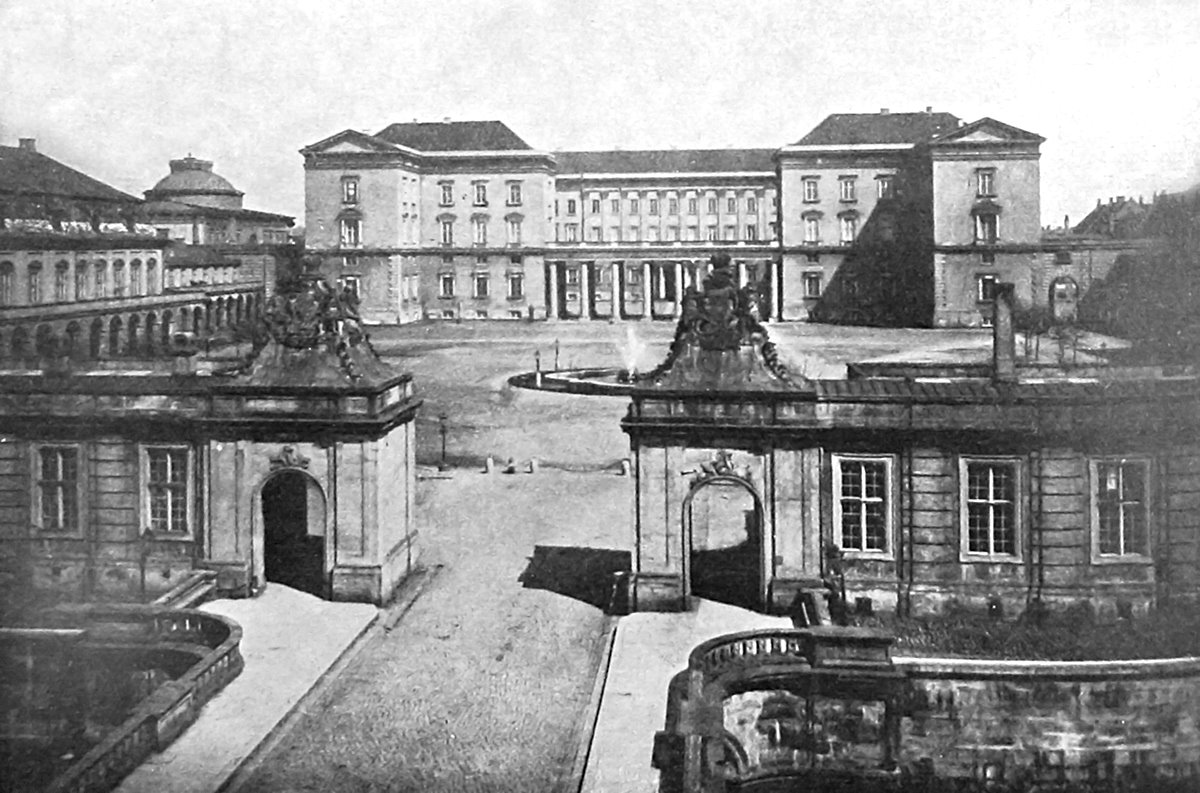
The second Christiansborg Palace seen from the showgrounds

While the royal family lived in temporary accommodations at Amalienborg Palace, the master builder of Altona, architect Christian Frederik Hansen, was called to Copenhagen to resurrect the palace. Hansen started building the second Christiansborg in 1803 in a French Empire style. By the time the palace was finished in 1828, King Frederick VI had decided he did not want to live there after all, and he only used the palace for entertainment. King Frederick VII was the only monarch to live in the palace. This was between 1852 and 1863.

After the introduction of the constitutional monarchy with the Constitution of 1849, the south wing of the palace became the meeting place of the two houses of the first Danish Parliament (the Rigsdagen).

The second Christiansborg burned down in 1884. The showgrounds, including the Riding School, court theatre and Hansen's chapel were saved. The ruins remained in place for the following 23 years due to political fighting.

=== Third Christiansborg ===
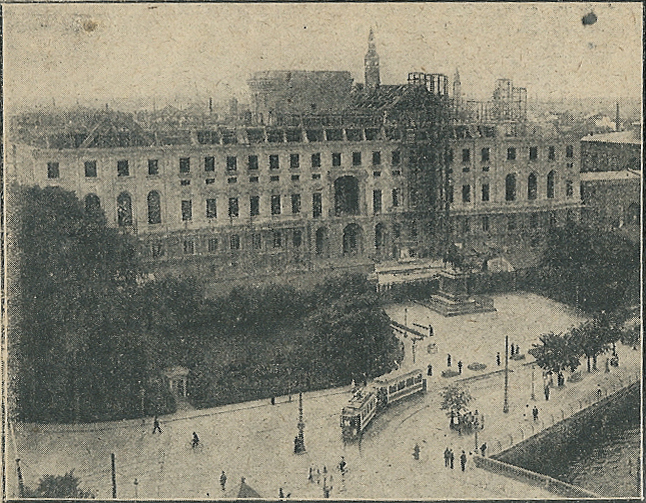
Construction of the third (and current) palace in 1914

Thorvald Jørgensen won an architecture competition to decide who would design the third (and current) Christiansborg, which was built from 1907 to 1928. The palace was to contain premises for the royal family, the legislature and the judiciary, and was built in Neo-baroque style in reinforced concrete with granite-covered façades. Fragments from C.F. Hansen's palace were preserved in the north façade facing Prince George's Yard (Prins Jørgens Gård). The original roof was tiled, but after a national collection, the tiles were replaced with copper in 1937–1938. A weather vane with two crowns was later added to the tower, and at 106 meters became the tallest tower in the city.

During the digging work, they came across the ruins of Absalon's Castle and Copenhagen Castle. It was decided to make them publicly accessible, and the ruins under the current palace, and the historical exhibition opened to the public in 1924.

== Christiansborg Palace today ==
1: The palace, 2: King's Gate, 3: The Palace Square, 4: Inner Courtyard, 5: Entrance to the parliament, 6: The Rigsdag Courtyard, 7: The Theatre Museum, 8: The Royal Stables, 9: The Marble Bridge, 10: The Show Grounds, 11: The Riding School, 12: Thorvaldsen's Museum, 13: Entrance to the Supreme Court, 14: Queen's Gate, Entrance to the Royal Reception Rooms,15 The Palace Chapel, 16: Prince George's Courtyard

The palace is roughly divided in the middle, with the Parliament located in the southern wing and the Royal Reception Rooms, the Supreme Court and the Prime Minister's Office in the northern wing.

Several parts of the palace are open to the public after published schedule with guided tours available, for a substantial fee. It is centrally located in Copenhagen's Indre By ("City Center") district.

=== Royal Reception Rooms ===
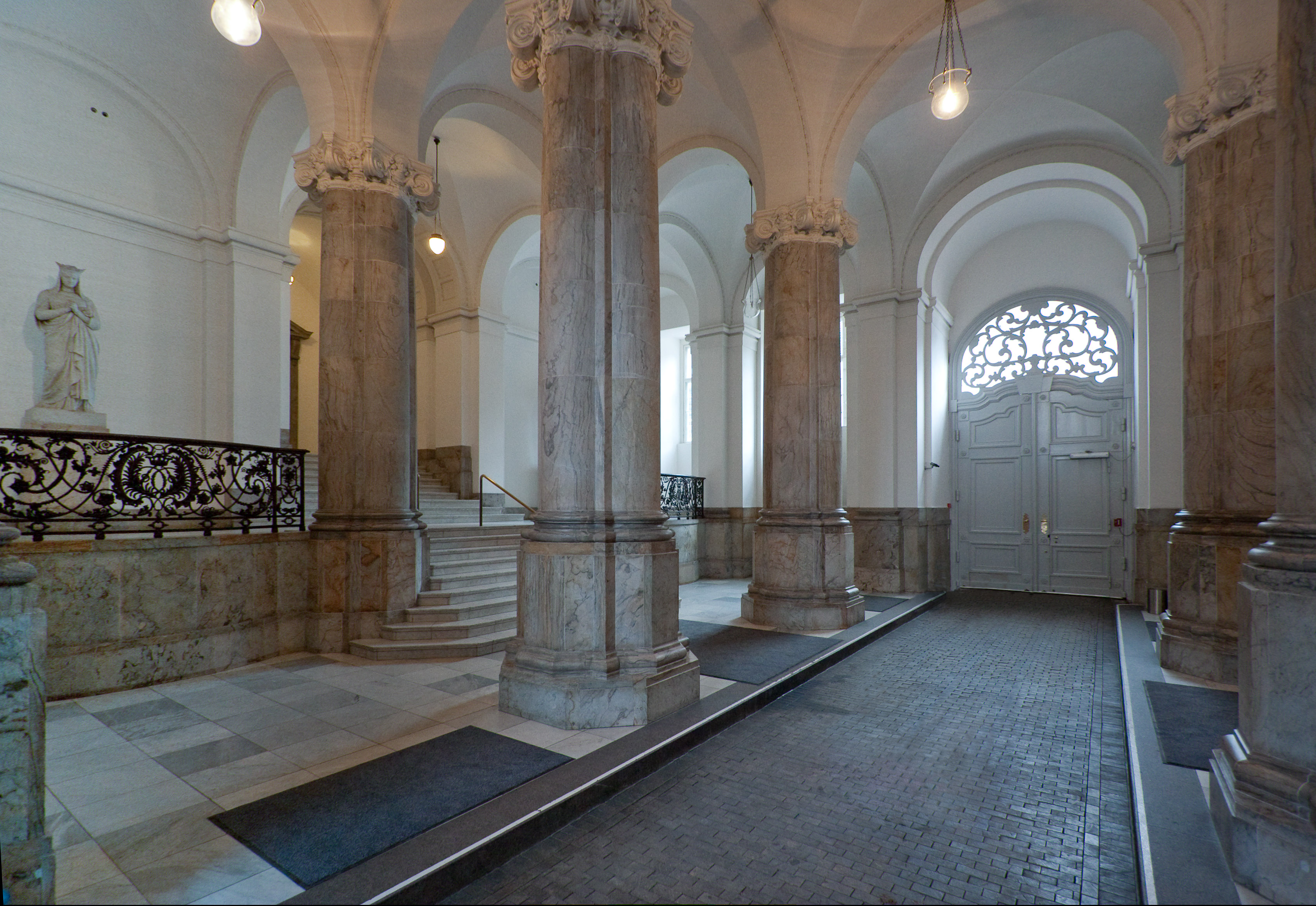
The Queen's Gate is the principal entrance to The Royal Reception Rooms.

The Royal Reception Rooms at Christiansborg Palace are located on the ground floor and first floor in the northern half of the palace. The Rooms are used for official functions of the monarch such as banquets, state dinners, the New Year's levée, diplomatic accreditations, audiences and meetings of the council of state.

The Reception Rooms are richly adorned with furniture and works of art rescued from the two earlier palaces, as well as decorations by some of the best Danish artists, such as Nikolaj Abraham Abildgaard, Christoffer Wilhelm Eckersberg, Laurits Tuxen, Joakim Skovgaard and Bjørn Nørgaard.

To reach the Royal Reception Rooms one goes through the Queen's Gate (Dronningeporten), and through the Hall of the Halberdiers (Drabantsalen) to the King's Stairway (Kongetrappen). At the foot of the stairs are the Audience Chamber (Audiensgemakket) and the State Council Room (Statsrådssalen). The King holds an audience every other Monday and attends Council with the government as required – usually on Wednesdays. The King in Council signs new Acts after their adoption in Parliament. The Audience Chamber and the State Council Room are the only Royal Reception Rooms that are closed to the public.

The King's Stairway gives access to the Tower Hall (Tårnsalen). The Tower Hall displays a series of tapestries with motifs from Danish folk songs, woven after cartoons painted by Joakim Skovgaard.

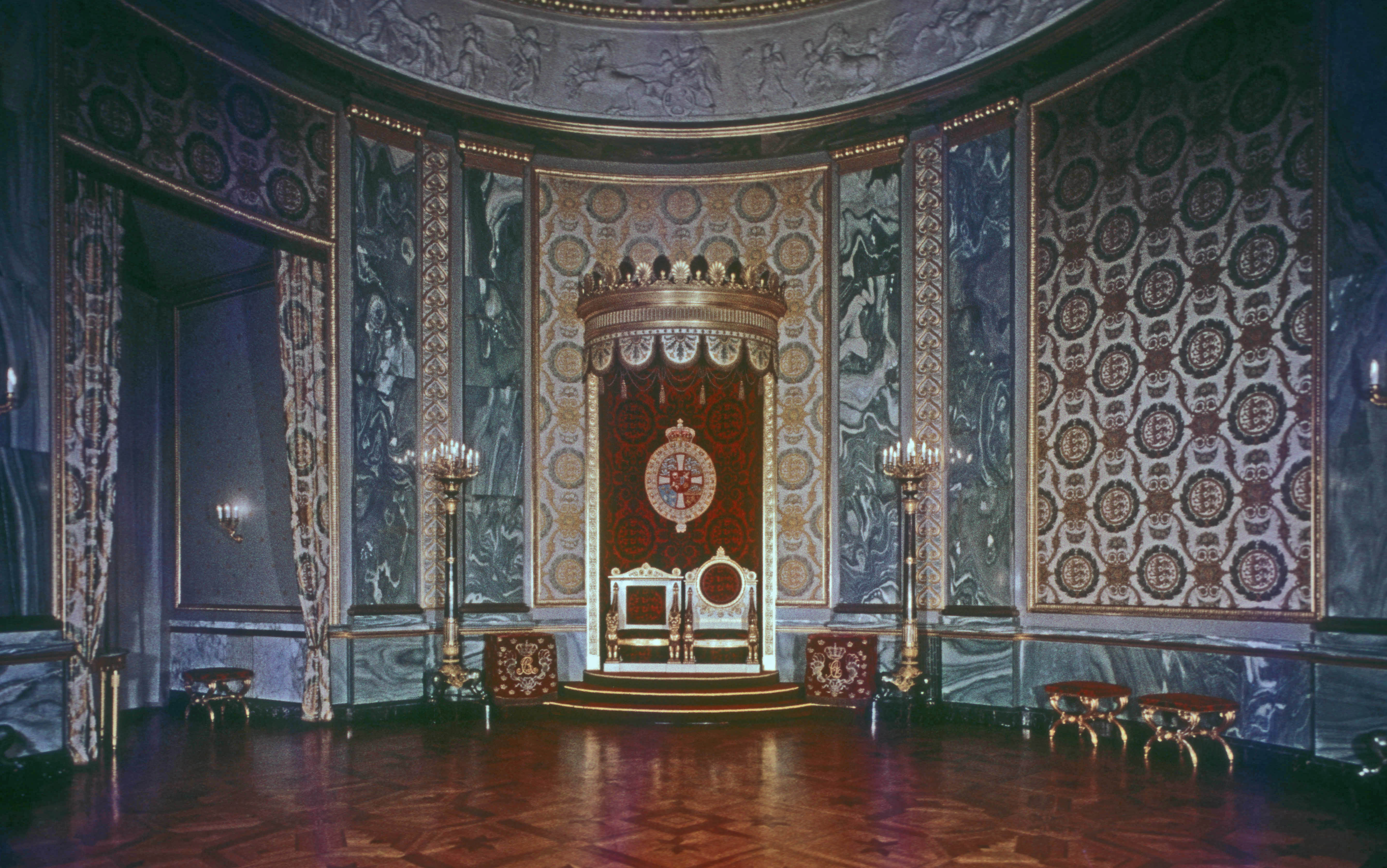
The Throne Room is where foreign ambassadors present their credentials to the King.

Facing the Palace Square is the oval Throne Room (Tronsalen) where foreign ambassadors present their credentials to King Frederik X. The Throne Room gives access to the balcony where the Danish monarchs are proclaimed. The Throne Room is decorated with a large ceiling painting by Kræsten Iversen, depicting how the Danish flag, Dannebrog, fell from the sky in Estonia in 1219.

The Royal Reception Rooms also include the Fredensborg Hall (Fredensborgsalen), with Laurits Tuxen's painting of King Christian IX and his whole family together at Fredensborg Palace, and parts of the Queen's Library.

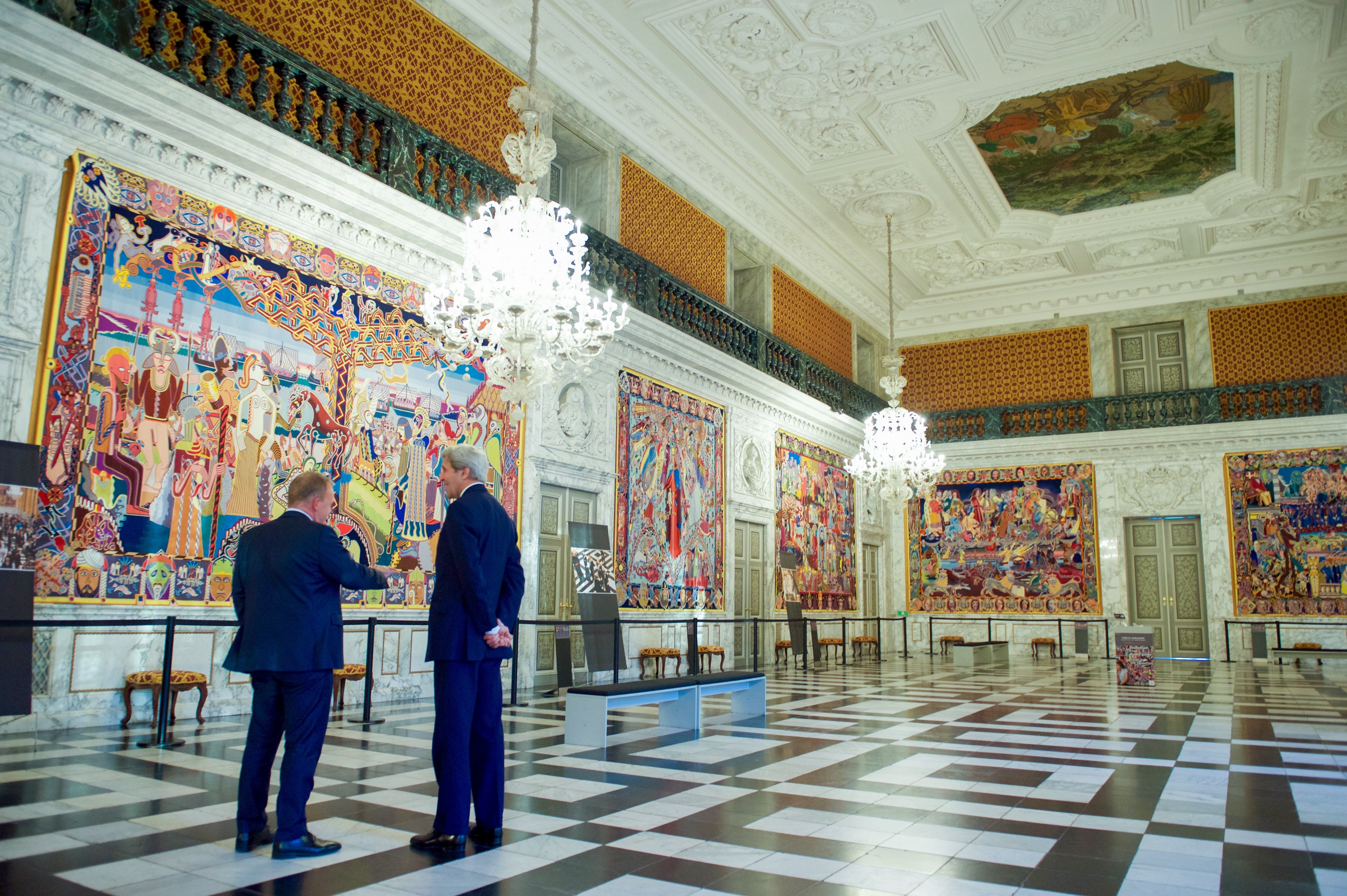
The Great Hall with Bjørn Nørgaard's tapestries.

The Great Hall is the largest and most spectacular of the Royal Reception Rooms. The Hall is 40 metres long with a ceiling height of 10 metres, and a gallery runs all the way around the room. The Hall seats 400 guests and is used for banquets, state dinners and receptions.

The Great Hall was renovated on the occasion of Queen Margrethe II's 60th birthday when artist Bjørn Nørgaard's 17 tapestries recounting the history of Denmark were hung on the walls. The tapestries were a gift from the Danish business community on the occasion of Queen Margrethe II's 50th birthday.

The Alexander Hall (Alexandersalen) is named for Bertel Thorvaldsen's marble frieze "Alexander the Great Enters Babylon". The frieze was made for the second Christiansborg Palace, and parts of it survived the fire. It was later restored and mounted in this room. The Hall is used for smaller receptions and official dinners, often in connection with state visits.

=== Parliament Wing ===
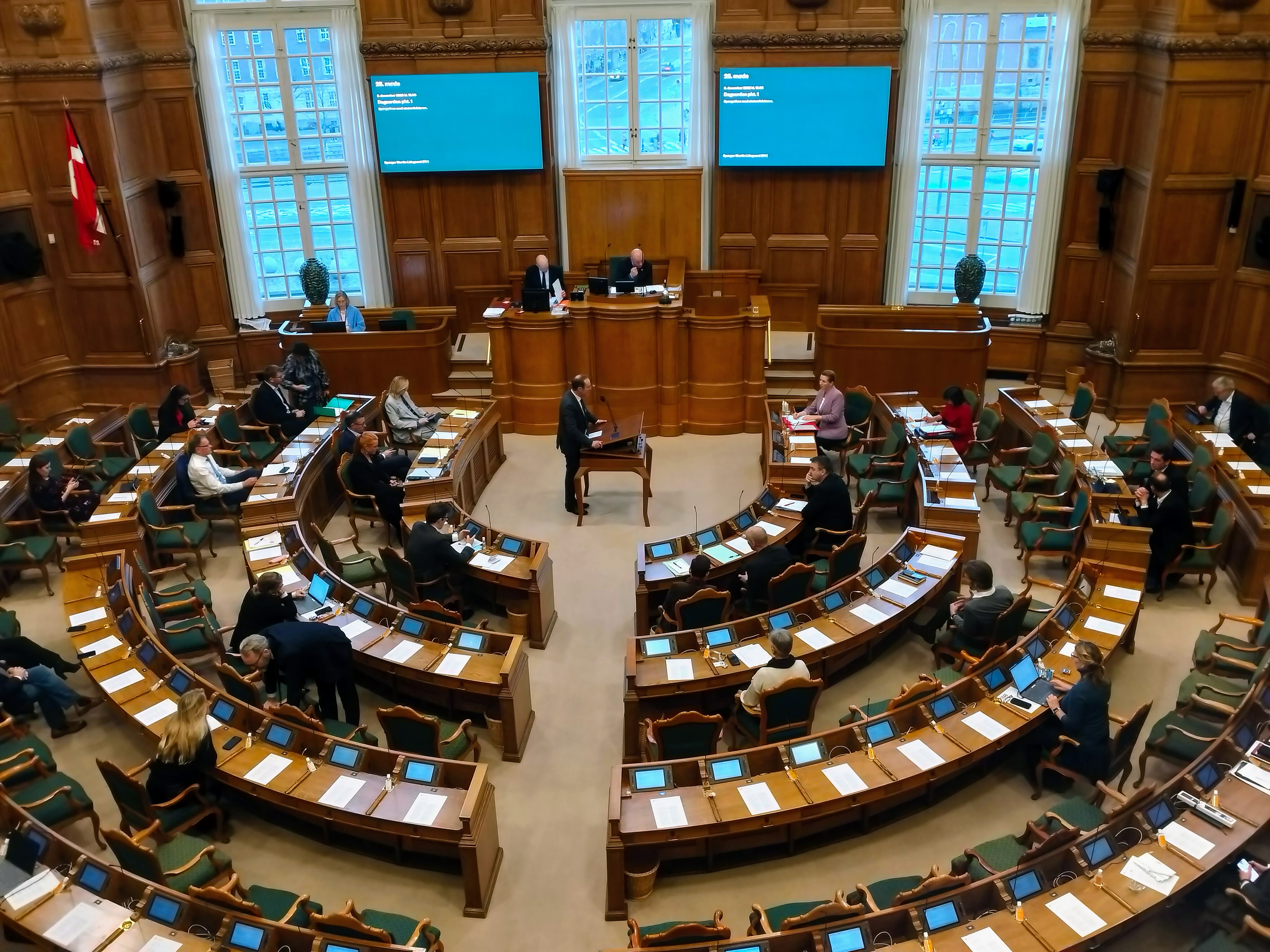
The Folketing Chamber

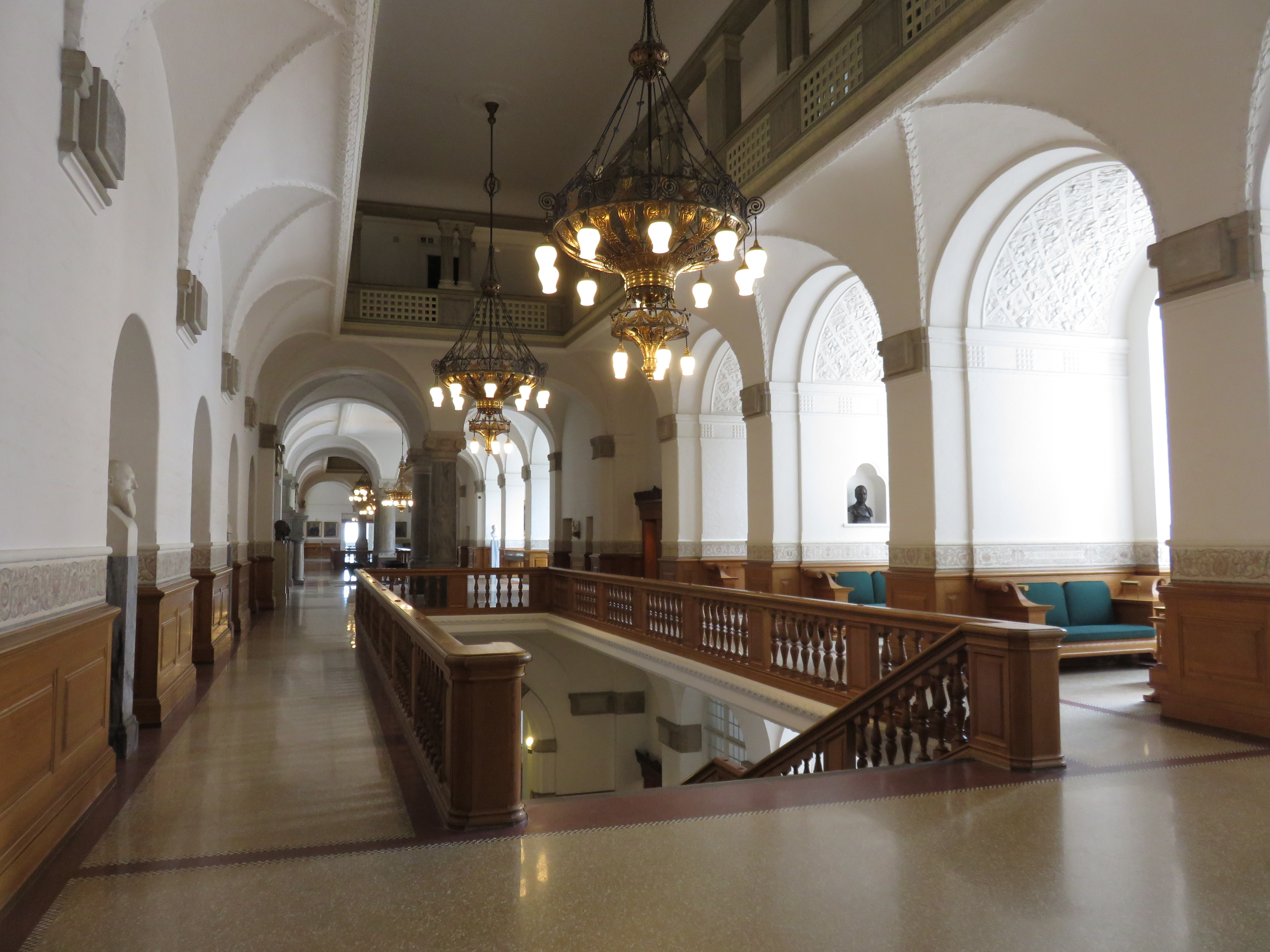
The Lobby (Vandrehallen)

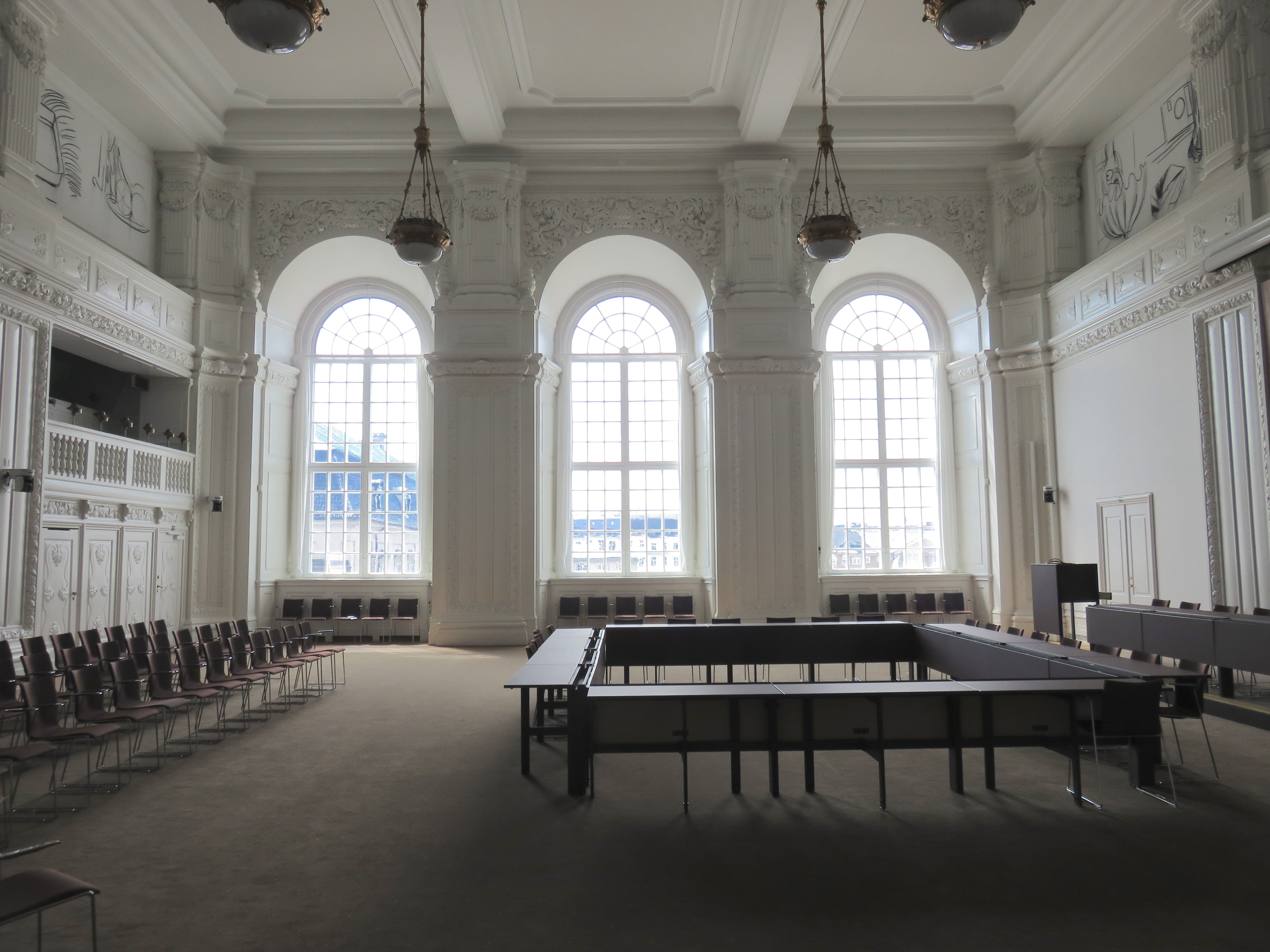
The Landsting Chamber

The first floor of the Parliament Wing is structured around the Lobby. At both ends of Lobby are the chambers of Rigsdagen, the former bicameral parliament; the Folketing chamber is located at the far end and the Landsting located at the other (the far chamber has been the only one in use since the Folketing became the sole legislative assembly in 1953). Along the hall are various rooms such as the Speaker's office and offices for the administration.

=== Ruins under the palace ===
Under the present palace lie the ruins of Bishop Absalon's Castle and Copenhagen Castle. When the foundations of the present Christiansborg Palace were being cast, workers came across ruins of several buildings and parts of a curtain wall.

Experts were called in from the National Museum of Denmark and the ruins, which lay beneath the inner palace yard, were unearthed. Public interest in these ruins, which dated back to around the year 1167, was tremendous. It was therefore decided that the ruins should not be covered over again but preserved for posterity. The reinforced concrete structure erected to cover the ruins was the biggest of its kind in Denmark when it was built in 1908.

The ruins beneath the palace square were excavated in 1917 and a cover was also built over them. The ruins have been open to the public since 1924. The Ruins Exhibition was renovated during the period 1974–77 and has remained more or less untouched since then.

=== The Palace Chapel ===
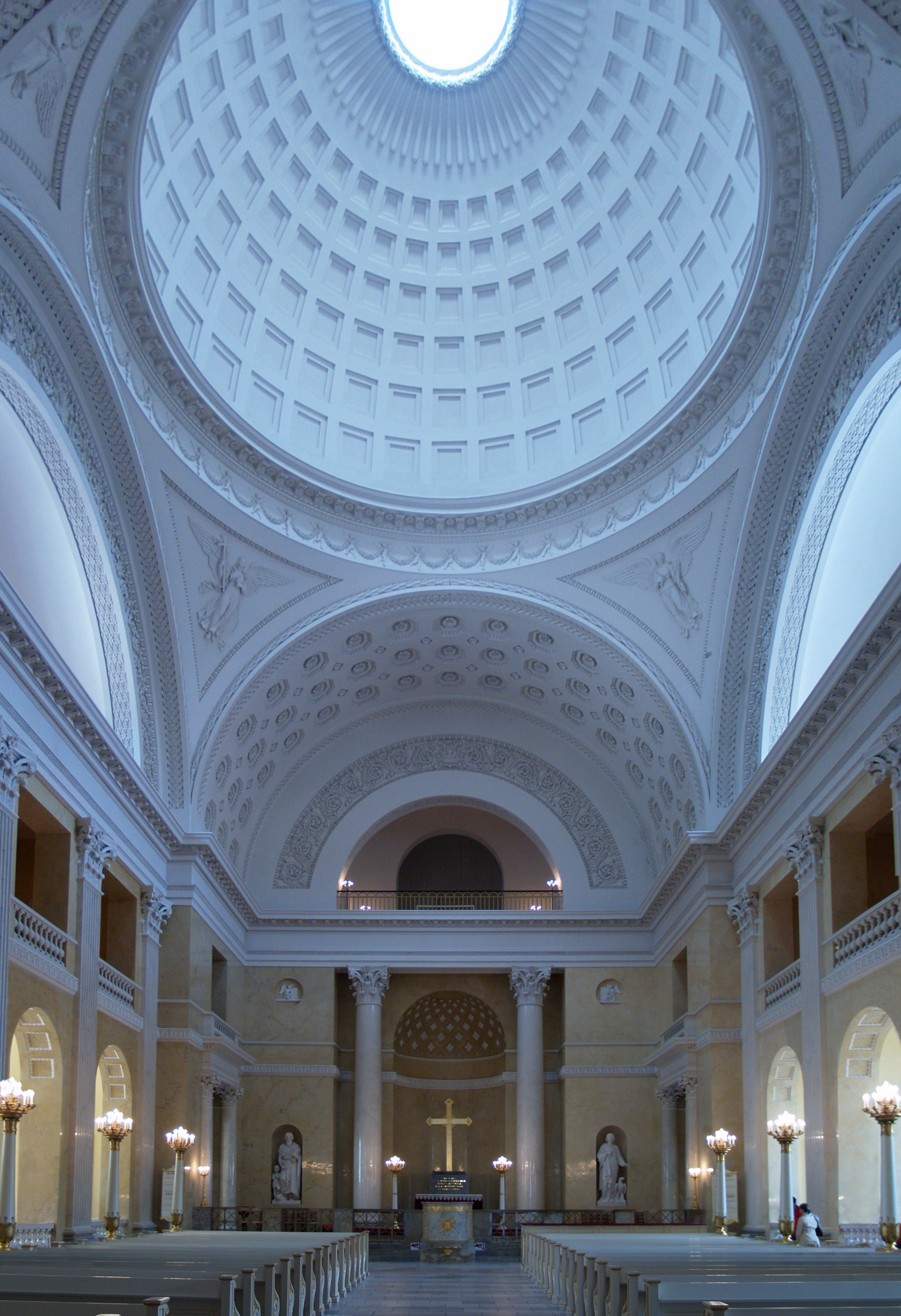
The Palace Chapel

Christiansborg Palace Chapel is a part of the palace which is at the disposal of the Danish monarch. It is used for religious ceremonies for members of the Danish royal family, most notably baptisms, confirmations and official lying in state. It is also used by the Danish Parliament for church services in connection with the opening of parliament.

The history of Christiansborg Palace Chapel goes back to the first Christiansborg Palace, which was built by the contractor general Elias David Häusser from 1733 to 1745. King Christian VI was keen on architecture, and he commissioned a talented young architect in the King's building service, Nicolai Eigtved, to design the palace chapel (1738–42). Eigtved seized the opportunity and designed one of the most distinguished Rococo interiors in Denmark.

In 1794 fire ravaged the palace and it was decided to demolish the ruins completely. The demolition, however, never took place.

Architect Christian Frederik Hansen, who resurrected the palace between 1803 and 1828, was also commissioned to rebuild the palace chapel in 1810. Work commenced in 1813, using the existing foundations and masonry as far as possible. The church and main palace were built in strict neo-classical style, with a dome construction on top of a central church interior. The palace chapel was inaugurated on Whit Sunday, 14 May 1826, to mark the 1,000 anniversary of the introduction of Christianity to Denmark.

The second palace fire in 1884 spared the church, as the fire was stopped in the buildings linking it to the palace. However, fate finally caught up with the church on 7 June 1992. The church burned to the ground, probably set ablaze by fireworks set off during the Whitsun carnival.

During the 1992 church fire, the roof, dome and dividing floor were burned down and the inventory severely damaged. Shortly afterwards, the Danish Ministry of Finance's Palaces and Properties Agency began rebuilding the chapel in collaboration with Erik Møller's Drawing Studio A/S and Royal Inspector of Listed State Buildings Jens Fredslund. No drawings existed of the dome and roof, but a systematic exercise in building archaeology registered the charred remains of the building, and made it possible to recreate the dome and roof. Historically accurate building methods were also used throughout the rebuilding process.

Danish craftsmen were unable to undertake the difficult work of restoring and recreating the interior's scagliola. One of Germany's leading experts, Manfred Siller, took charge and taught the venerable technique to Danish stucco workers.

The rebuilt church was inaugurated on 14 January 1997 to celebrate Queen Margrethe II's Silver Jubilee. The rebuilding was awarded the prestigious Europa Nostra prize.

=== Riding Ground Complex ===
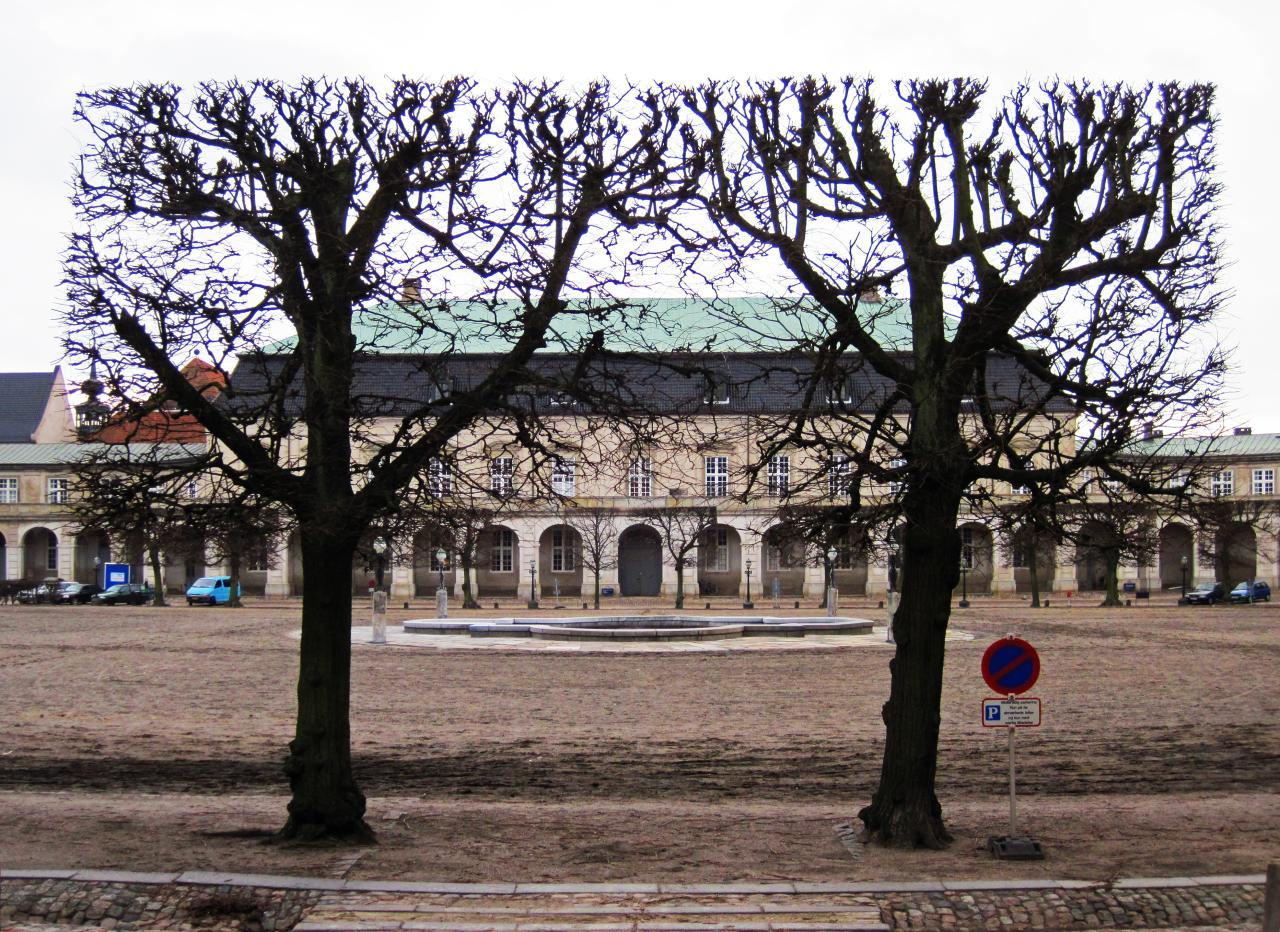
Christiansborg Riding Grounds and the Royal Stables

The Show Grounds are now all that remain of the first Christiansborg Palace. They consist of two symmetrical wings with a straight, low and narrow stable building followed by a high broad building and narrow, curved stables, after which a one-story narrow end building closes off the wings at the Frederiksholm Canal end.

In 1742, the north wing became the first one to be finished. Building work on the south wing started in June 1740 but ground to a halt by the autumn due to difficulties in obtaining supplies. Work did not recommence until January 1744, now under the supervision of the young architect Nicolai Eigtved. In 1746, 87 hunting horses and 165 carriage horses moved into the new stables, the largest number ever.

In 1766–67, the architect Nicolas-Henri Jardin built a court theatre on the floor above the big stables. It now houses the Theatre Museum.

The Royal Stables are home to the horses and carriages used to perform the ceremonial transport for the Danish royal family during state events and festive occasions. In 1789 the number of horses reached a peak with 270 horses stabled. Today, there are about 20 horses left, and some parts of the original stable buildings have been converted into offices and garages.

From 2007 to 2009 the Royal Stables underwent a thorough renovation to meet the requirements of current animal welfare law.

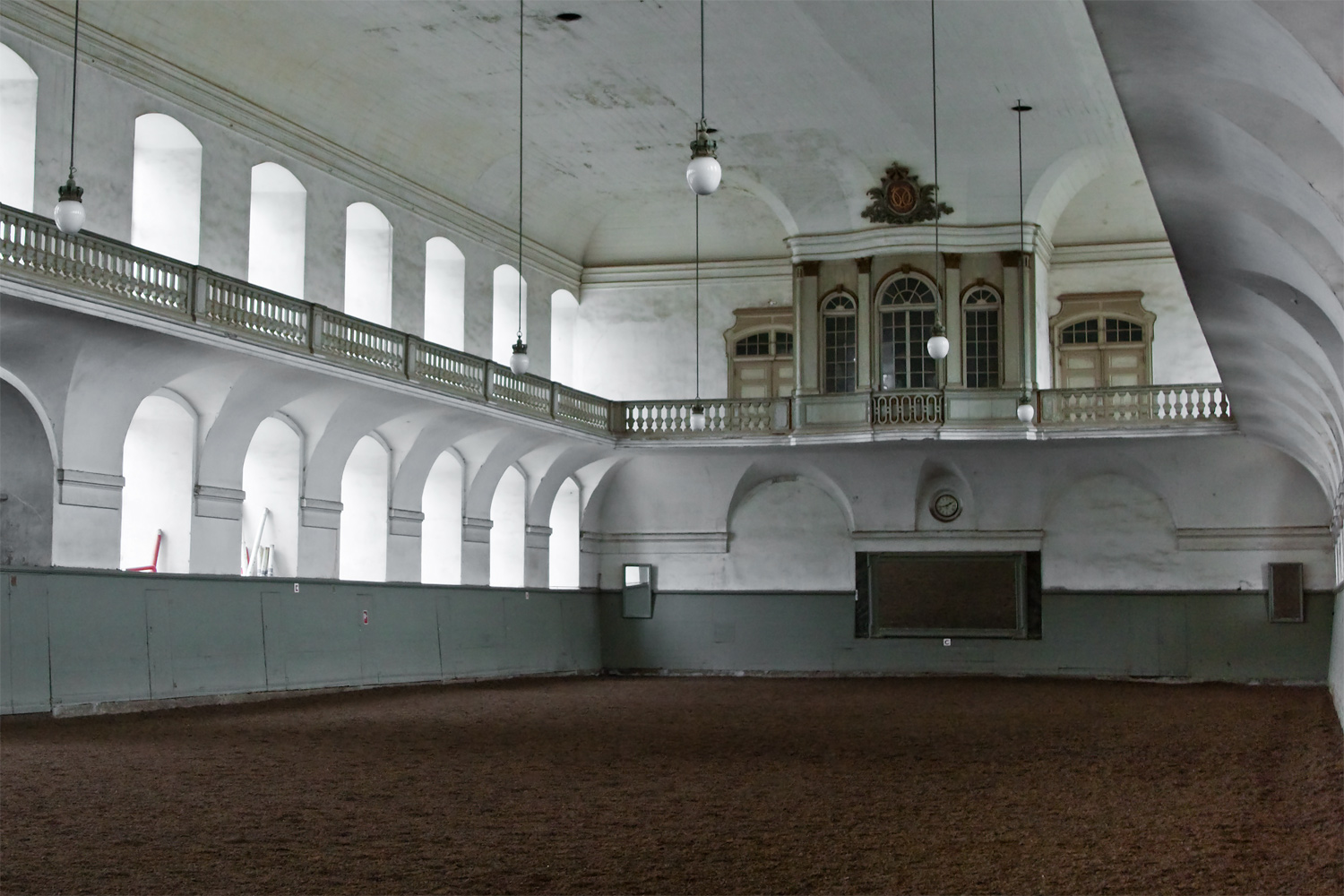
The Riding School with the royal box on the balcony in the background

A Riding School is located in the northern wing of the Riding Ground Complex, opposite the Court Theatre. The Riding School is used for horse shows and to exercise the horses of the Royal Stables. On occasion it is also used for various cultural events such as opera or theatre performances.

The interior is more or less unchanged since the construction in the 1740s. It is equipped with a balcony and a royal box to allow audiences the possibility to attend exercises and performances. The royal box is unique as it is the only royal room preserved from the first palace.

==== The Court Theatre ====
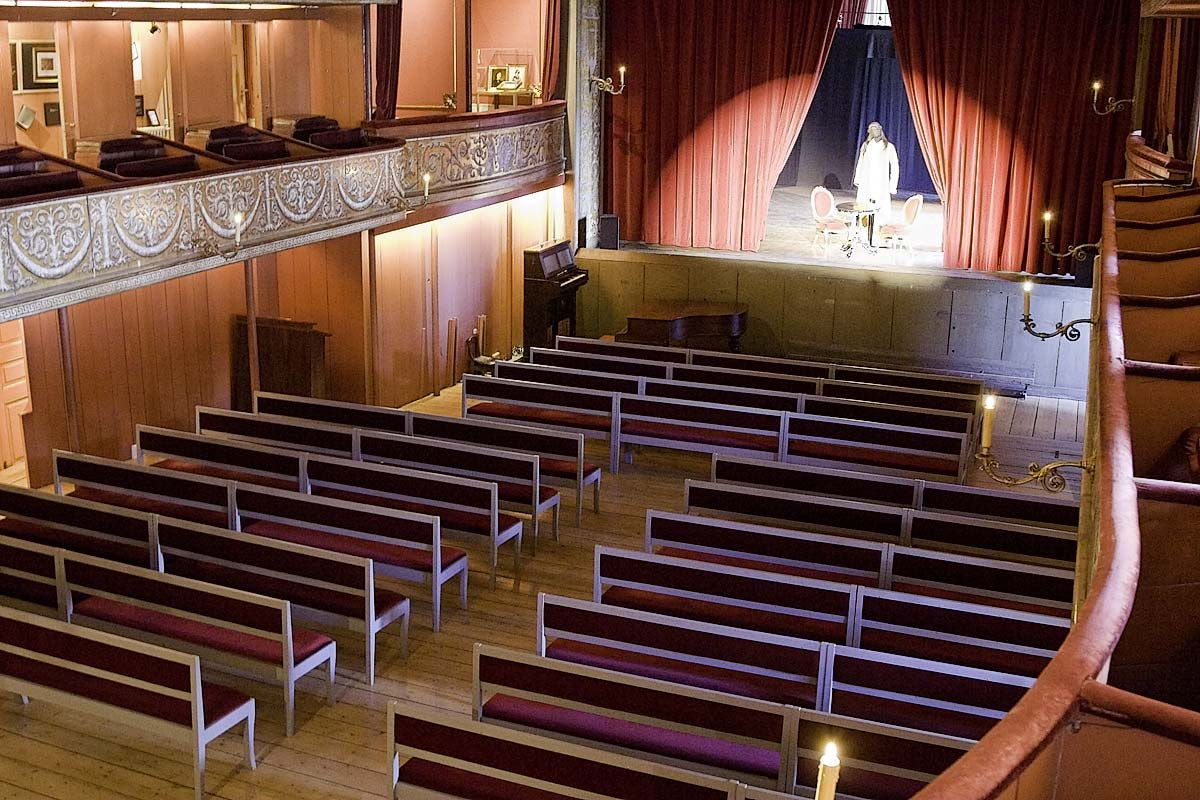
The auditorium of the Court Theatre

The Court Theatre is located over the stables in the southern wing of the Riding Ground Complex, opposite the Riding School. Since 1922 the Court Theatre has housed the collection of the Theatre Museum. The auditorium is often used for theatre performances, lectures and television programmes.

Already at the Copenhagen Castle, one of the wings was fitted out as a theatre. However, the first Christiansborg Palace was constructed without a theatre. During the early reign of King Christian VII it became customary to have theatre performances in the Banqueting Hall, and in 1766 it was decided to construct a proper court theatre. A harness storeroom was adapted to an auditorium. The theatre was designed by the French architect Nicolas-Henri Jardin and inaugurated by King Christian VII and Queen Caroline Matilda in January 1767. Little remains of this original theatre as it was reconstructed in 1842 following the designs of architect Jørgen Hansen Koch. In time the Court Theatre came to function as an annex to the Royal Danish Theatre. In 1881 the theatre was closed as performance venue following the tragic fire of the Ringtheater in Vienna which underlined the dangers involved in the continued use of old theatres.

=== The Tower ===
In June 2014, a viewing platform in the Tower, still the tallest in the city, was made accessible to the public, while the interior of the Tower was refurbished and a restaurant opened in place of what was once a storage room. Access to the viewing platform is free, though passing through a security check is required due to the official nature of the building. There is a comfortable lift giving access to upper levels.

==== The View ====
The View, an observation deck of the Tower, gives an opportunity to enjoy the views of the following buildings:

- the southeastern direction: Børsen, the Church of Our Saviour, Christian's Church, the Black Diamond, Radisson Blu Scandinavia Hotel (Copenhagen), Koncerthuset, the AC Hotel Bella Sky Copenhagen;
- the southwestern direction: the Danhostel Copenhagen City, the Crystal, the Ny Carlsberg Glyptotek, Tivoli Gardens, Copenhagen Central Station, Carlsberg Headquarters, Carlsberg Silo, the Radisson Blu Royal Hotel, Copenhagen City Hall, the Scandic Palace Hotel;
- the northwestern direction: Frederiksberg Town Hall, the Church of Our Lady, the Round Tower, the Church of the Holy Ghost, the Nikolaj contemporary art center, Rigshospitalet;
- the northeastern direction: the Marble Church, Amalienborg, Magasin du Nord, Amagerværket, Holmen Church, Danmarks Nationalbank.

=== Other features ===
==== The Marble Bridge and the pavilions ====
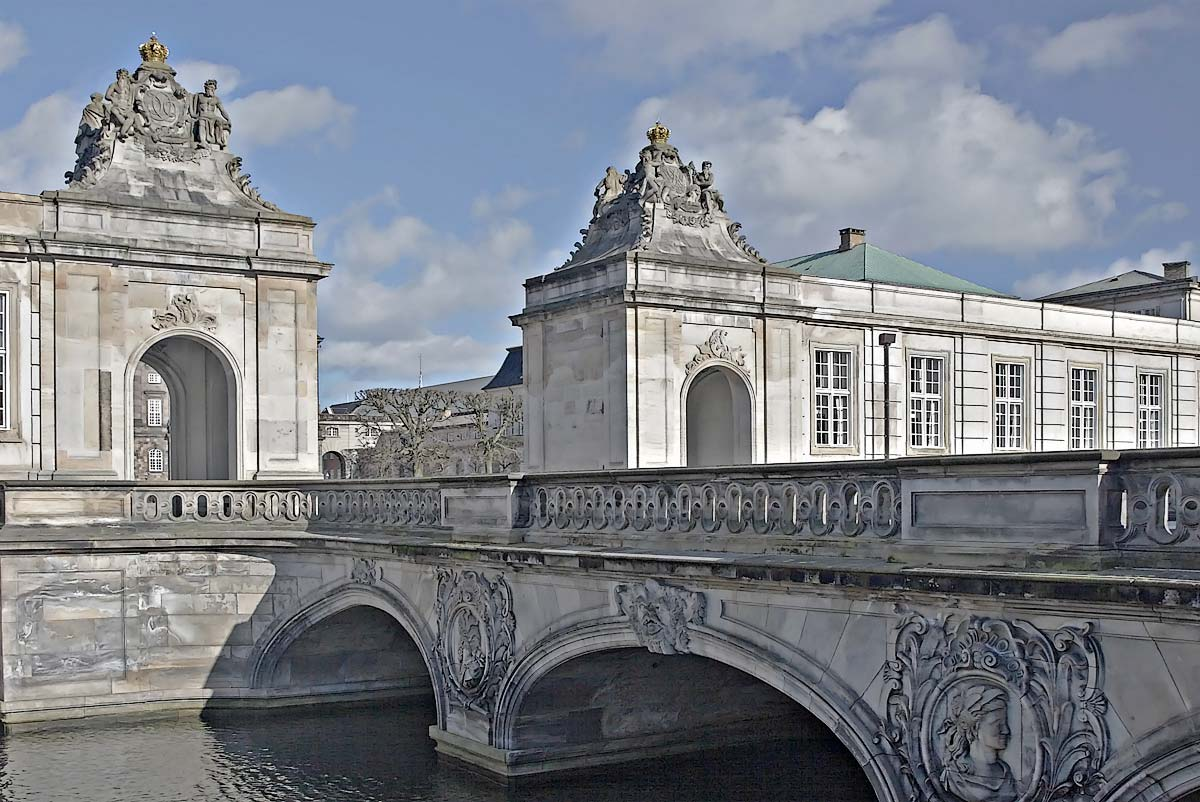
The Marble Bridge and the pavilions

In Häusser's original project from the first Christiansborg, the two wings of the palace were linked by a gatehouse at the Frederiksholms Kanal end, and a drawbridge led over the canal. The Palace Building Commission was not completely satisfied with the proposal and asked two young architects working for the royal building authority, Nicolai Eigtved and Lauritz de Thurah, to come up with an alternative suggestion.

Their proposal included a permanent bridge over Frederiksholms Kanal forming the main entrance to the palace and two portal pavilions flanking an open drive and closing the complex off between the two wings. Both bridge and pavilions were in the new rococo style.

Responsibility was transferred to Eigtved, who was the prime mover behind the project.

The bridge was extremely elegant— sandstone covered with medallion decorations by the sculptor Louis August le Clerc. The pavements were paved with Norwegian marble, hence the name the Marble Bridge (Marmorbro), and the roadway paved with cobblestones.

The pavilions were every bit as magnificent as the bridge. They were covered with sandstone from Saxony, and the sculptor Johan Christof Petzoldt richly decorated the concave roofs with the royal couple's back-to-back monograms and four figures on each roof symbolising the royal couple's positive traits. The interior decoration was by the court's master stonemason Jacob Fortling. The bridge and pavilions were finished in 1744.

In 1996, when Copenhagen was European Capital of Culture, the Palaces and Properties Agency finished a restoration of the Showgrounds that had taken many years. The Marble Bridge and Pavilions were restored between 1978 and 1996 by architect Erik Hansen and the Show Grounds from 1985–1996 by Royal Inspector of Listed State Buildings Gehrdt Bornebusch.

==== King Christian IX's equestrian statue ====
A collection was started for the construction of a monument to King Christian IX shortly after his death in 1906. The following year four artists were invited to compete for the commission. There was no discussion about the position of the statue. It would be erected on Christiansborg Riding Ground Complex as a pendant to the statue of King Frederick VII on the Palace Square.

Sculptor Anne Marie Carl-Nielsen, the wife of composer Carl Nielsen, won the competition with her proposal for a new equestrian statue. In the proposal, the statue was shown on a high pedestal, on the sides of which were reliefs depicting a procession of the leading men of the day, including industrialist Carl Frederik Tietgen, politician Jakob Brønnum Scavenius Estrup and poets Jens Peter Jacobsen and Holger Drachmann. The reliefs were later axed, and the architect Andreas Clemmensen designed the pedestal that bears the horse today.

The sculptor sought throughout the country for the right horse to stand as a model, but found it in Hanover in Germany. This gave rise to a good deal of displeasure among Danish horse breeders.

The monument took a long time to complete, but in 1927, 21 years after the King's death, it was unveiled on the Riding Ground Complex.

== Gallery ==
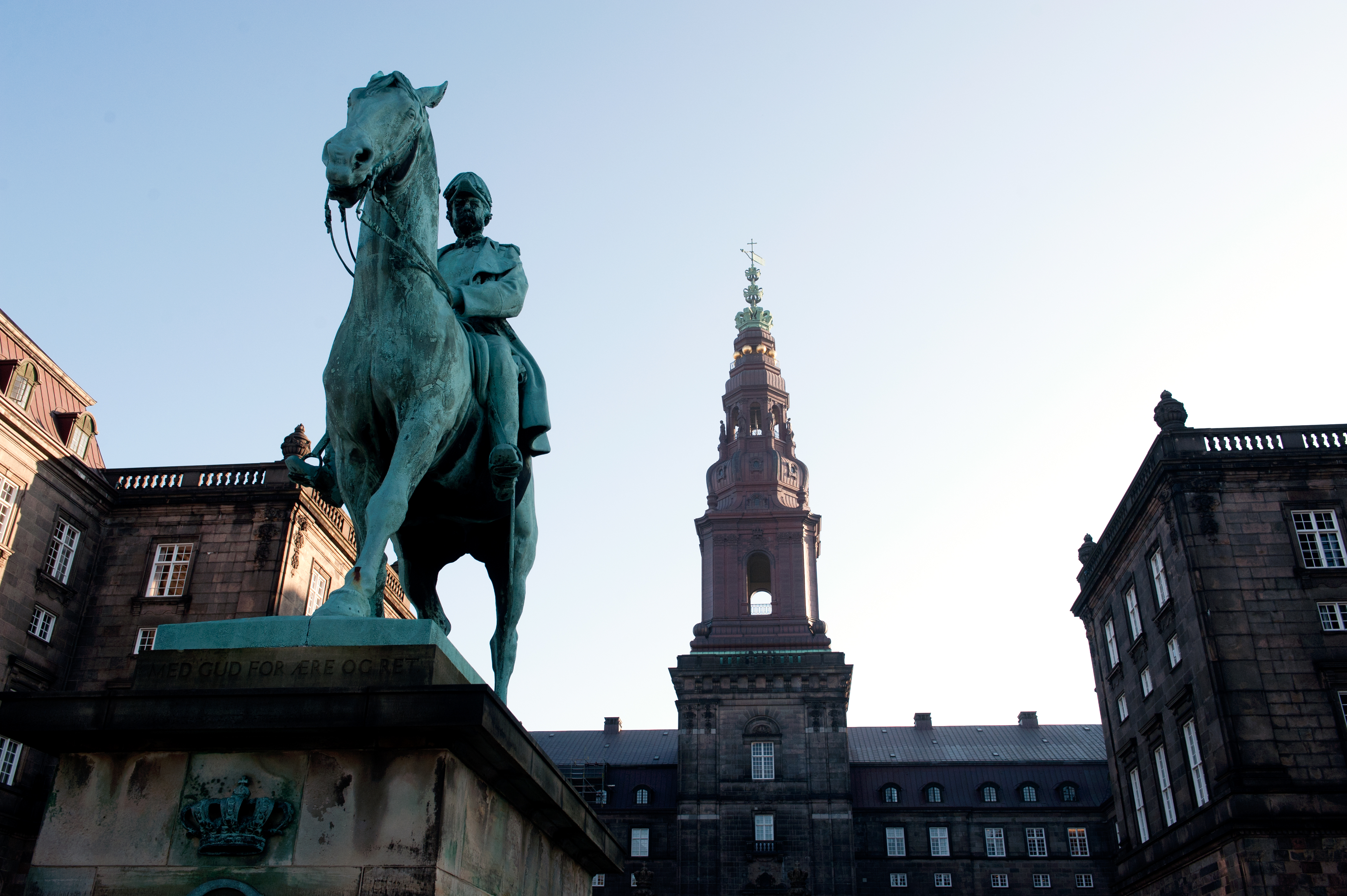
Equestrian statue of Christian IX. Not to be confused with the statue of Frederick VII on the Palace Square

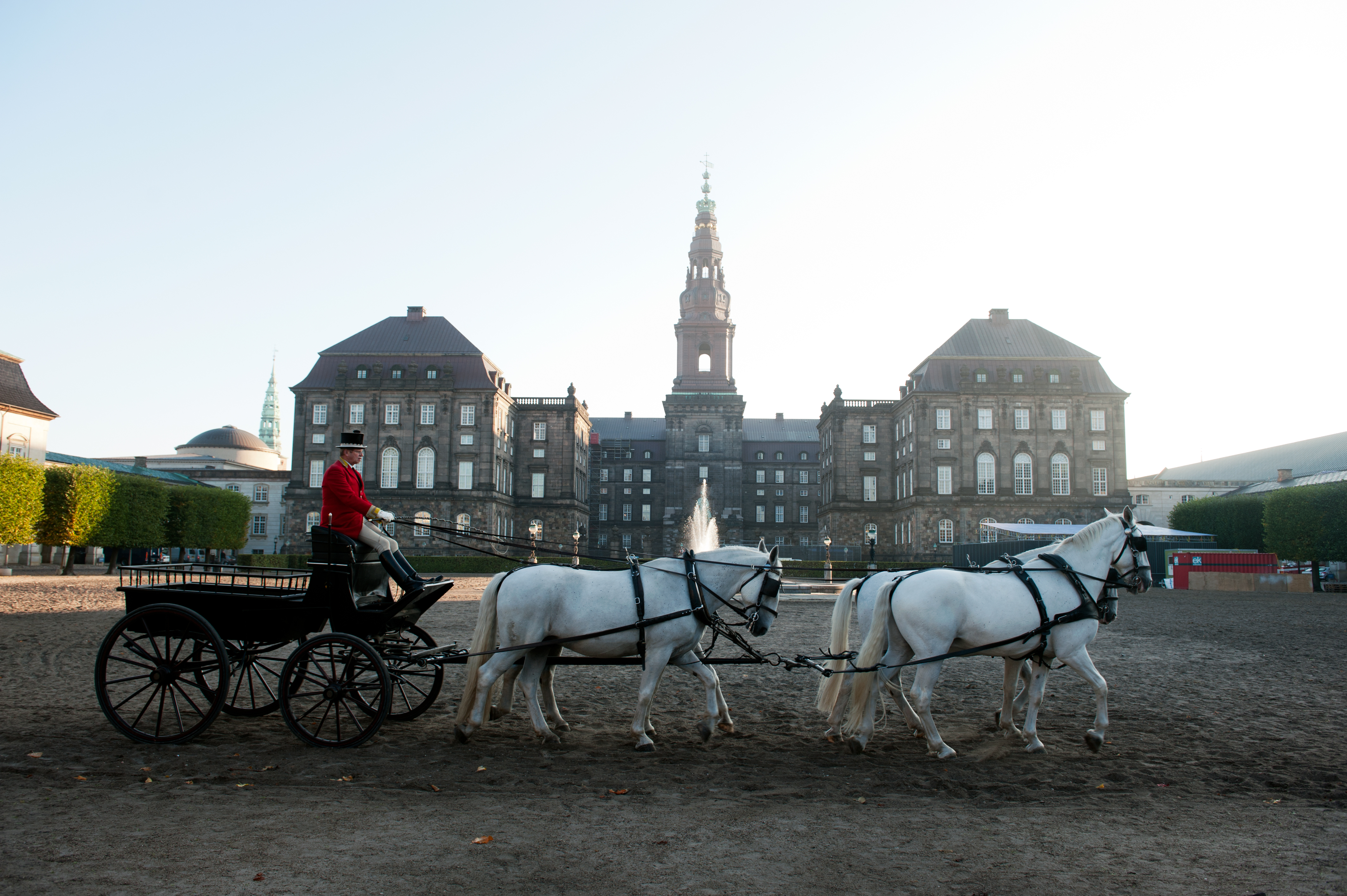
The Show Grounds at Christiansborg Palace dates back to 1745.

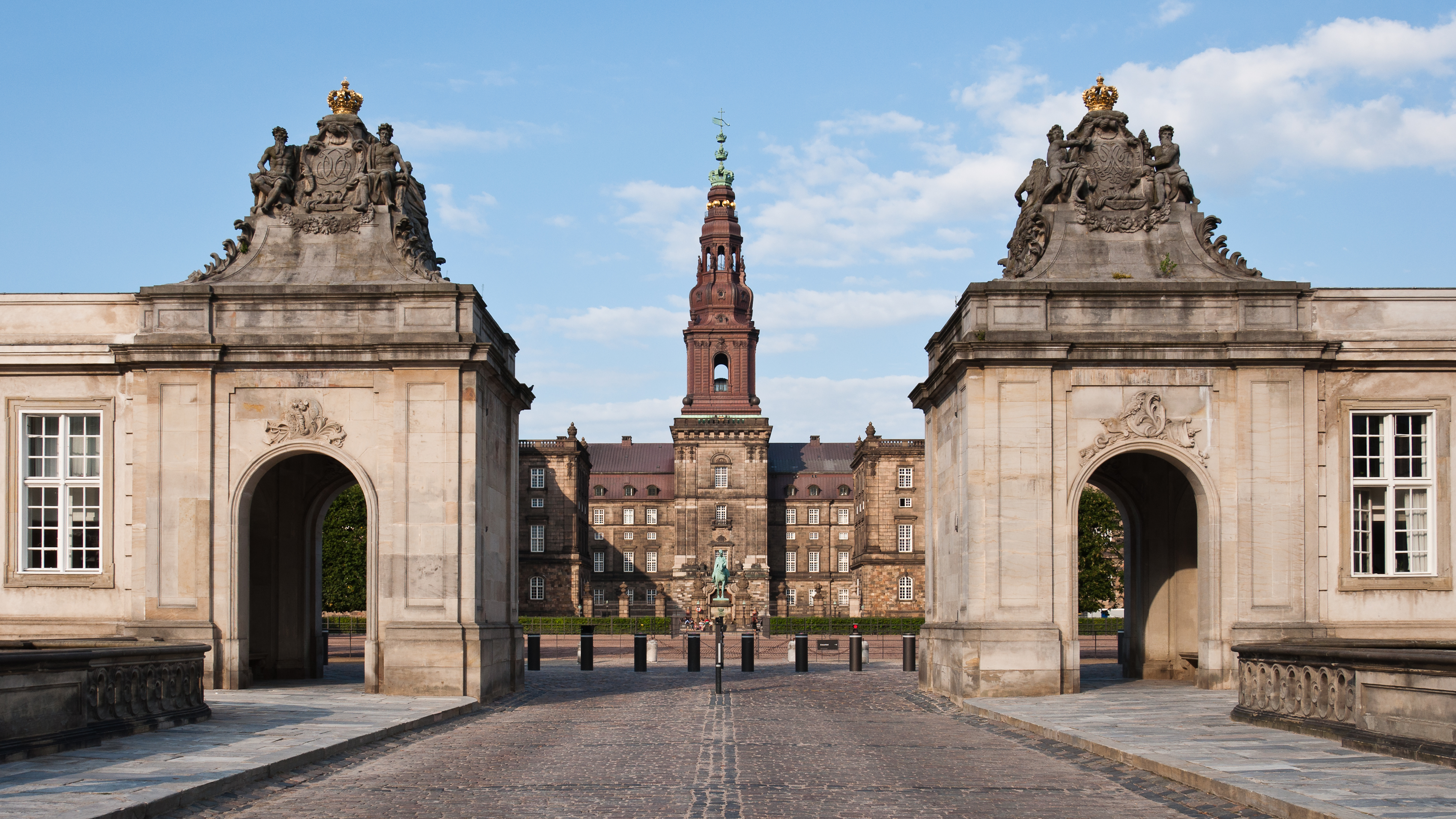
The main entrance to the Royal Stables with the two Rococo pavilions on each side of the Marble Bridge from 1739

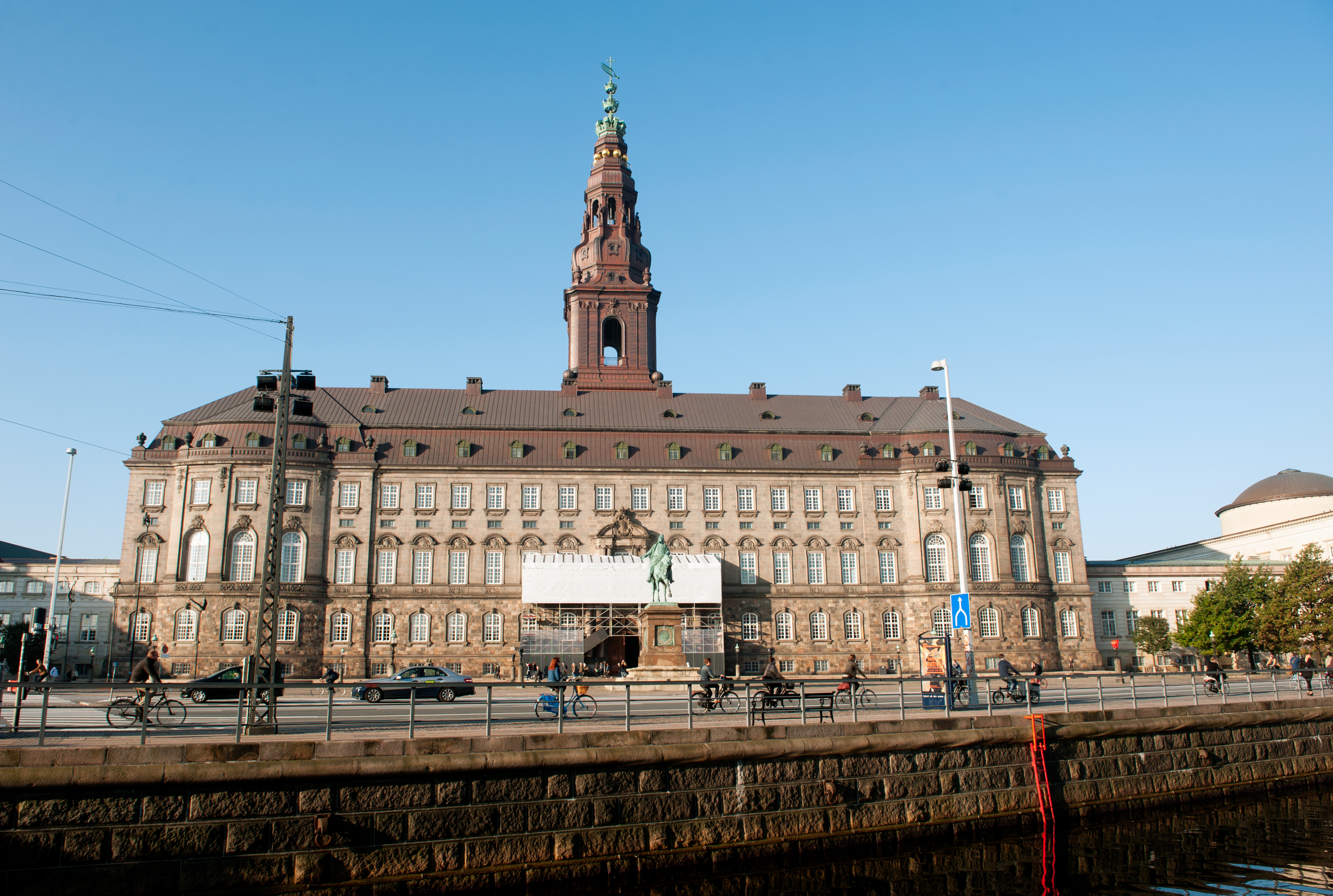
Front of the palace, looking on to the square. The tower reaches a height of 106 metres.

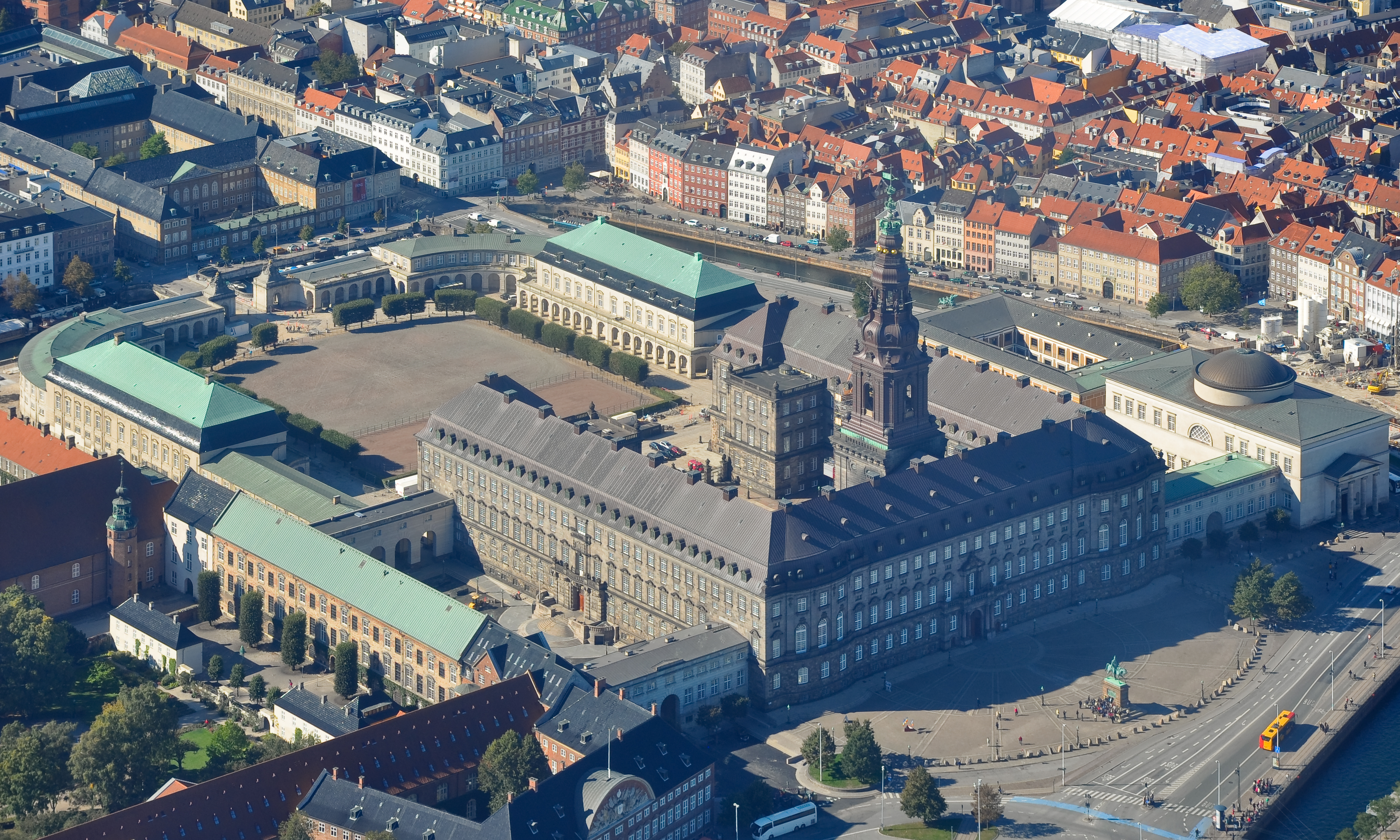
Aerial view from the east
