= Erik Hansen (architect) =

Danish architect and archaeologist

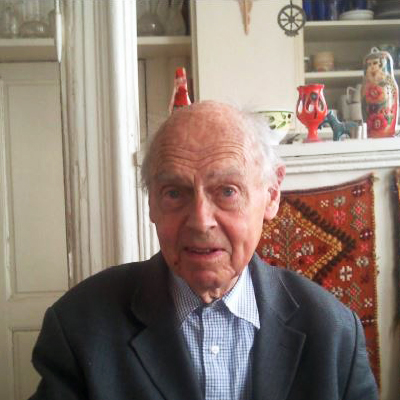
Erik Hansen at his home in Copenhagen, 2015

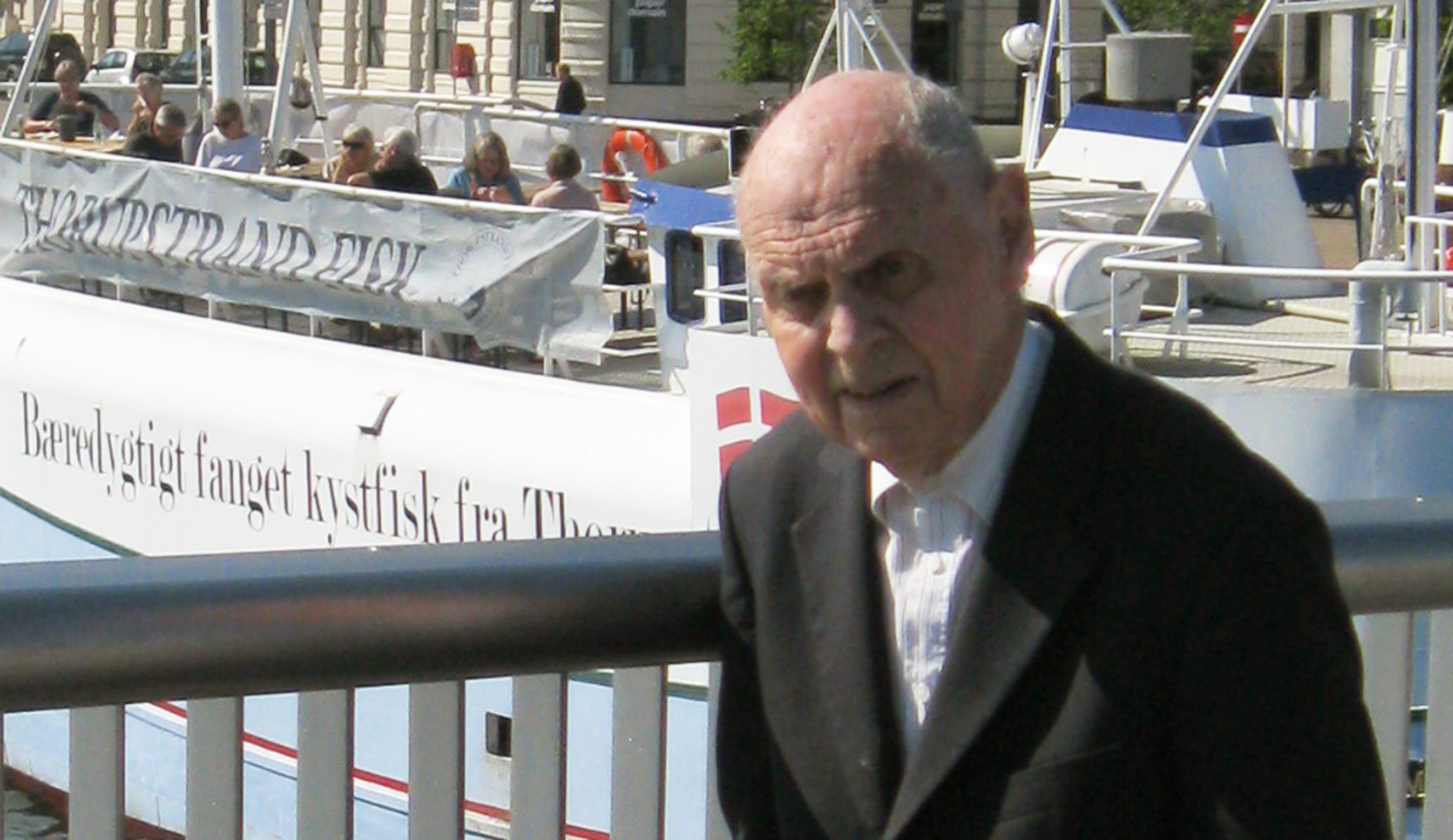
Architect Professor Erik Hansen, at age of 89, at the pedestrian bridge of Nyhavn Copenhagen in summer 2016.

Erik Hansen (13 May 1927, Ribe - 31 December 2016, Copenhagen) was a Danish professor, architect, and author who has achieved international recognition for his contributions to archaeological conservation. Over the years, he participated in investigative field work, mainly in Denmark and Greece, but also other countries (including Afghanistan, Cambodia, and Turkey), producing widely acclaimed drawings of his finds.

Erik Hansen was five years old when he lost his parents and was raised by his aunt Karen and uncle Jeppe in the villa behind the bishop's palace in Ribe in southwest Jutland. He studied mathematics at the Ribe Cathedral School and apprenticed in timber at the city technical school. He attended the University of Copenhagen to study mathematics, physics, and chemistry. He also completed the preparatory examination in philosophy course, before deciding to follow in his father's footsteps and pursue architecture.

After one year he changed to the School of Architecture, Royal Danish Academy of Fine Arts in Copenhagen, where he studied in Buildings and architectural history at Professor Mogens Koch's department where his artisanal interest and knowledge in carpentry was relevant. Architect Otto von Sprechelsen was one of Erik's best friends. Throughout his working life, Erik undertook the survey and documentation of building culture and monuments with careful measurements; the aim was to understand the monument and its construction technology, building and organizational factors underlying. His role model in this artisanal approach to conservation work was the Danish architect-archaeologist Ejnar Dyggve.

Erik Hansen's surveying style, described by some as "sterile", and his use of stringent ink lines, contained the necessary information for an understanding of a monument's structural state. This approach influenced architectural education not only in Denmark but in many other countries where he was sent on mission by UNESCO, including to Afghanistan and Cambodia. Erik Hansen's international students in the Royal Danish Academy of Fine Arts, School of Architecture were from Afghanistan, Cambodia, Ethiopia, Ghana, Greece, Mexico and other Scandinavian countries.

His stay in Greece was one of the more durable and linked to Apollo's sanctuary in Delphi. A few times he stayed there for several years, other times he visited the site every six months. The first major work of the Ecole Francaise d'Athènes was examining Siphniernes famous Treasury in Delphi in the years 1955-1965, a large-scale topographic atlas of the sanctuary, which was completed in 1968, and finally his outstanding research in Apollo's Temple and its reconstruction after a landslide in 373 [BC]. His unusually precise measurements of each stone after another, in conjunction with construction contracts with named contractors was carved in stone, was released in French school big series Fouilles the Delphes, in three much attractive Volumes in 2010.

In the many years living abroad he was accompanied by his Swedish wife Inger, called Kickan, who was pharmacist by education and a skilled photographer. Kickan was not just Erik's wife, she continued to be his tireless friend and engaged in everything he was dealing with. They both engaged with locals and wrote about what they saw and experienced. In Delphi they knew most of the inhabitants, and one was reminded about when travelling to Delphi, as one would carry a bag full of letters to their friends. Kickan and Erik also had their own traditions in Greece when the moon was full. They went out to the temple in dark and sat out there in silence, while the moon slowly rose above the deep valley of Delphi. Admittedly it was strictly forbidden. Erik lost Kickan in 2008 and lived alone for the remaining eight years of his life.

Along with his work in UNESCO in training young professionals for and restoration of monuments in Afghanistan, for example the Ghurid Portal of the Friday Mosque of Herat in Afghanistan [Kabul and Herat, 1964-5], then Cambodia [Phnom Kulen, 1968], and Korea, he also was deeply engaged in the difficult restoration works of the beautiful Marmorbro [the marble bridge] of Frederiksholms Channel in Copenhagen and its portals in the years 1977-1982. Also from this work there are stacks of upscale drawings produced in his hand-drawn lines that Akademirådet celebrated in 1977 awarding him Eckersberg medal. Also in France he in 1987 revered Prix Mendel, Academie des Inscriptions and Belles Lettres. Subsequently, in 2010, he was awarded the distinguished C. F. Hansen Medal for work with Siphniernes Treasury.

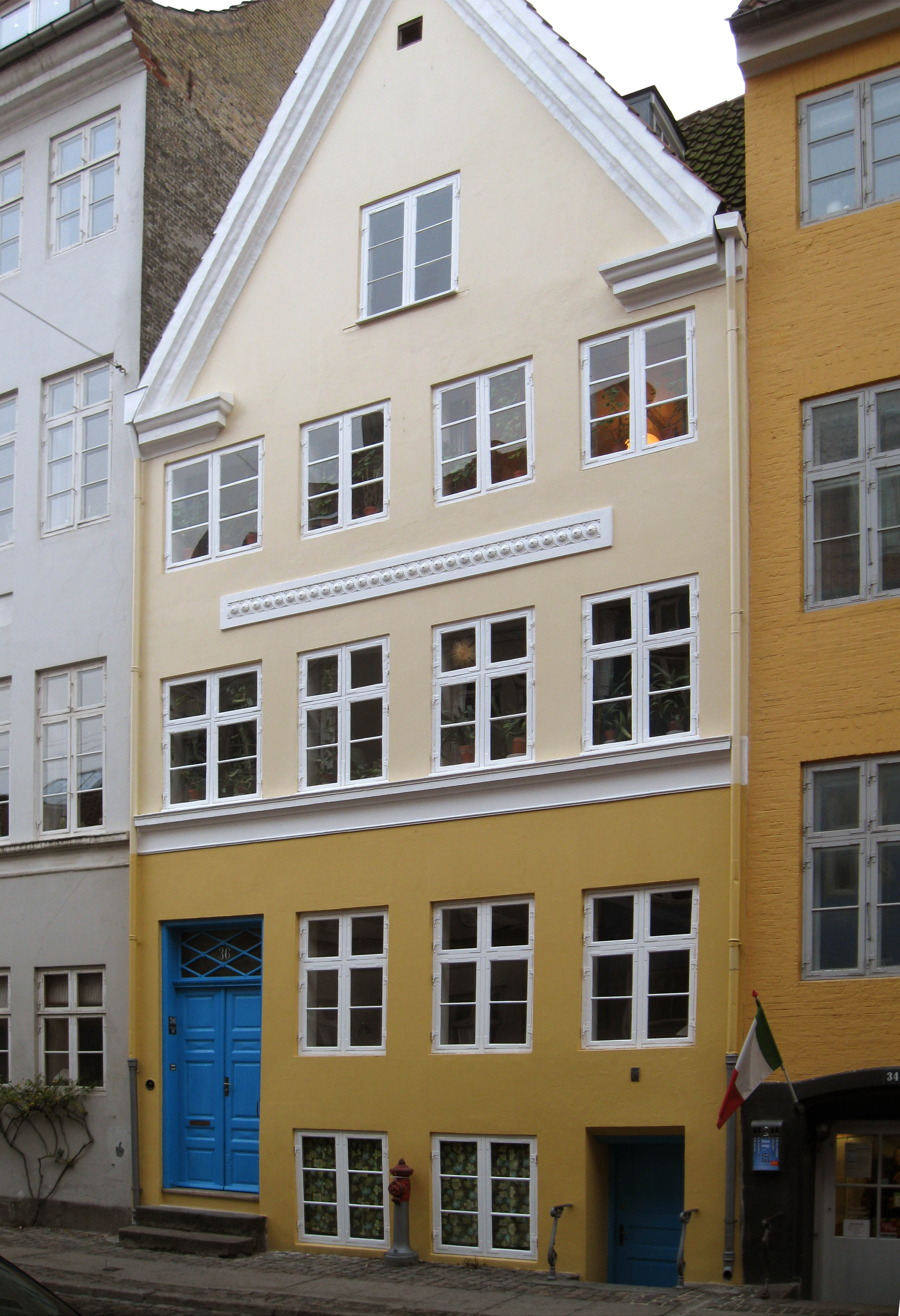
Erik Hansen's residence, a city house built in 1725 in Christianshavn, Copenhagen;The facade was restored again in autumn 2016.

Finally, his own residence, a city house built in 1725 in Christianshavn, Copenhagen, was an example of the simple building well preserved and maintained a citizen's house in which he lived with his wife Inger and their close friendship and entertained his colleagues, friends and students (national and internationals).

Erik Hansen's motto: "Well begun is half done - but well completed is only half started", summarizes his fine distinctive way of life.

== Literature ==
- Amandry, Pierre; Hansen, Erik; École française d'Athènes (2010). Fouilles de Delphes: Topographie et architecture. Le temple d'Apollon du IVe siècle. Texte (in French). Ecole française d'Athènes. ISBN 978-2-86958-205-7.
- Vest, Nils; Norsker, Erik; Kunstakademiets Arkitektskole, Arkitema, Slots- og Ejendomsstyrelsen (2005). Erik Hansen og Marmorbroen - En forelæsning (in Danish). Nils Vest Film.
- Algreen-Ussing, Gregers. "Obituary for Erik Hansen. Architect, Professor Emeritus" (PDF). Archived from the original (PDF) on 18 April 2018.
