= New Year's levee =

Canadian social event on New Year's Day

A New Year's levée is a social event on New Year's Day hosted by the Governor General of Canada, the lieutenant governors, military establishments, municipalities, and other institutions.

== History ==
The word levée (from French, noun use of infinitive lever, "rising", from Latin levāre, "to raise") originated in the levée du soleil (rising of the sun) of King Louis XIV (1643–1715). It was his custom to receive his male subjects in his bedchamber just after arising, a practice that subsequently spread throughout Europe.

In the 18th century the levée in Great Britain and Ireland became a formal court reception given by the sovereign or his/her representative in the forenoon or early afternoon. In the New World colonies the levee was held by the governor acting on behalf of the monarch. Only men were received at these events. Women were presented in the evening at court.

It was in Canada that the levée became associated with New Year's Day. The fur traders had the tradition of paying their respects to the master of the fort (their government representative) on New Year's Day. This custom was adopted by the governor general and lieutenant governors for their levées.

The first recorded levée in Canada was held on January 1, 1646, in the Château St. Louis by Charles Huault de Montmagny, Governor of New France from 1636 to 1648. In addition to wishing a happy new year to the citizens the governor informed guests of significant events in France as well as the state of affairs within the colony. In turn, the settlers were expected to renew their pledges of allegiance to the Crown.

The levée tradition was continued by British colonial governors in Canada and subsequently by both the governor general and lieutenant governors. It continues to the present day.

As mentioned, the levée was historically a male preserve but during World War II levées were attended by female officers of the armed forces. Since then levees have been open to both women and men.

== Present day ==
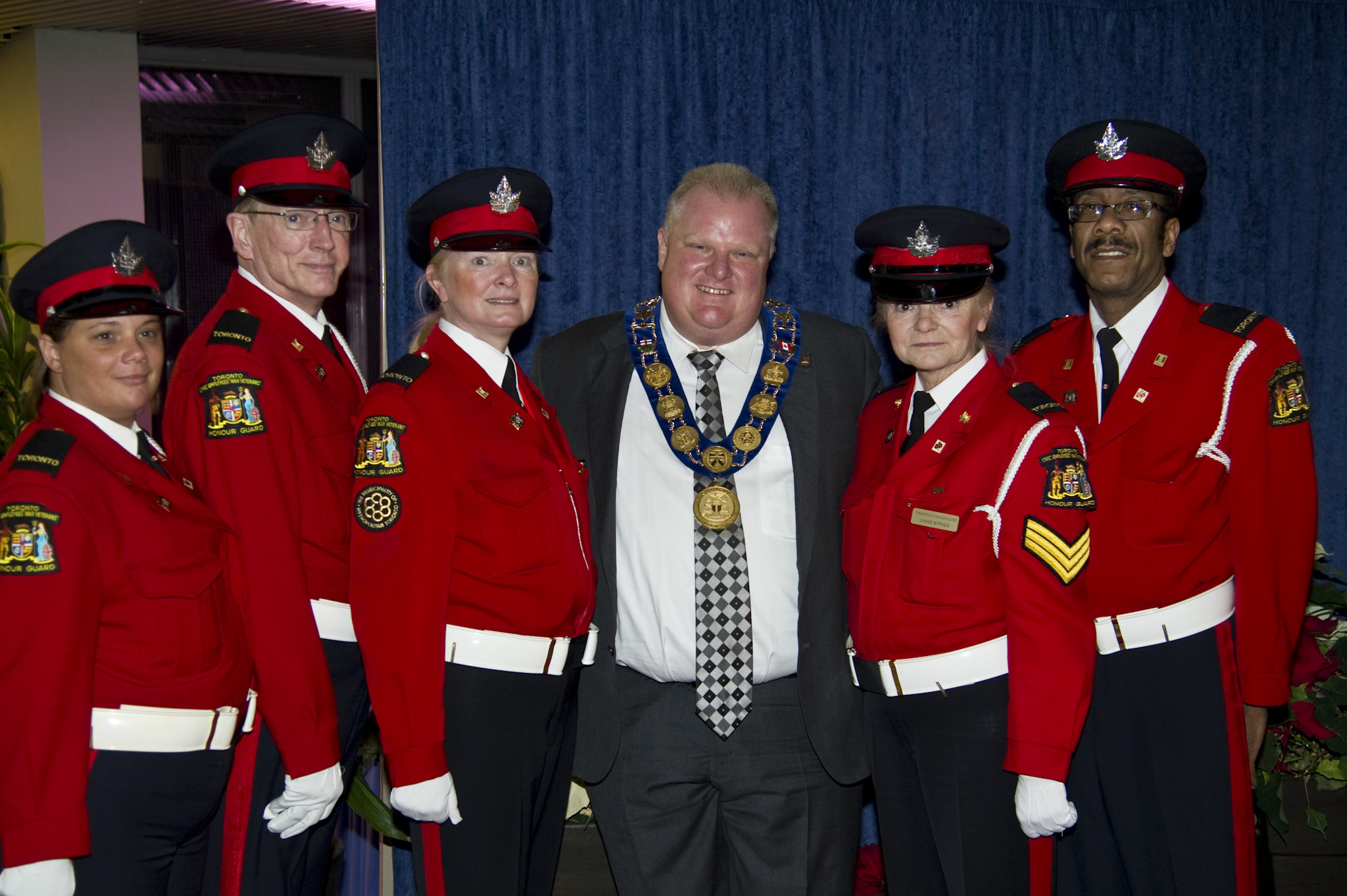
Rob Ford with Toronto Civic Employees War Veterans Honour Guard at the Mayor of Toronto's New Year's levee in 2011.

Over the years, New Year's levées have become almost solely a Canadian observance, although kinds of levées still exist in other countries.

Today, levées are the receptions (usually, but not necessarily, on New Year's Day) held by the governor-general, the lieutenant governors of the provinces, the military and others, to mark the start of another year and to provide an opportunity for the public to pay their respects.

Most levées may be attended by any citizen, including children. Attending the lieutenant governor's levée is an annual ritual for some families.

The province of Prince Edward Island maintains a more historical approach to celebrating levee day. On New Year's Day, all Legions and bars are opened and offer moose milk (eggnog and rum) from the early morning until the late night. Though there are still the formal receptions held at Government House and Province House, levée day is not only a formal event. It is something that attracts a large number of Islanders, which is quite unusual in comparison to the other provinces where it has gradually become more subdued. Prince Edward Island levées begin at 8 a.m.

The historic town of Niagara-on-the-Lake (the first capital of Upper Canada) holds a levée complete with firing of a cannon at Navy Hall (a historic building close to Fort George) The levée is well attended by townspeople and visitors. Toasts are made to the King, "our beloved Canada", the Canadian Armed Forces, veterans, "our fallen comrades", as well as "our American friends and neighbours".

Some religious leaders, such as the Bishop of the Anglican Diocese of Ontario, hold a levée on New Year's Day.

=== Refreshments ===
As has the levée itself, refreshments served at levées have undergone changes (both in importance and variety) over the years.

In colonial times, when the formalities of the levée had been completed, guests were treated to wine and cheeses from the homeland. Wines did not travel well during the long ocean voyage to Canada. To make the cloudy and somewhat sour wine more palatable it was heated with alcohol and spices. The concoction came to be known as le sang du caribou ("caribou blood").

Under British colonial rule, the wine in le sang du caribou was replaced with whisky (which travelled better). This was then mixed with goat's milk and flavoured with nutmeg and cinnamon to produce an Anglicized version called "moose milk". Today's versions of moose milk, in addition to whisky (or rum) and spices may use a combination of eggnog and ice cream, as well as other alcoholic supplements. The exact recipes used by specific groups may be jealously guarded secrets.

Refreshments were clearly an important element in the New Year's festivities. A report of the New Year's levée held in Brandon House in Manitoba in 1797 indicated that "... in the morning the Canadians (men of the North West Company) make the House and Yard ring with saluting (the firing of rifles). The House then filled with them when they all got a dram each." Simpson's Athabasca Journal reports that on January 1, 1821, " the Festivities of the New Year commenced at four o'clock this morning when the people honored me with a salute of firearms, and in half an hour afterward the whole Inmates of our Garrison assembled in the hall dressed out in their best clothes, and were regaled in a suitable manner with a few flagon's Rum and some Cakes. A full allowance of Buffaloe meat was served out to them and a pint of spirits for each man; the Women were also entertained to the utmost of our ability."

When residents called upon the governor to pay their respects they expected a party. In 1856 on Vancouver Island, there was "an almighty row" when the colonial governor's levée was not to the attendees' liking.

=== Municipalities with levées ===
- Ajijic, Jalisco, Mexico
- Almonte, Ontario
- Bracebridge, Ontario
- Brampton, Ontario
- Brantford, Ontario
- Brockville, Ontario
- Calgary, Alberta - Not a municipal event: hosted by HMCS Tecumseh
- Cannington, Ontario
- Cape Breton Regional Municipality, Nova Scotia
- Cambridge, Ontario
- Cobourg, Ontario
- Collingwood, Ontario
- Charlottetown, Prince Edward Island
- Grand Manan, New Brunswick
- Edmonton, Alberta - Not a municipal event: hosted by the lieutenant governor
- Elliot Lake, Ontario
- Esquimalt, British Columbia
- Georgina, Ontario
- Guelph, Ontario
- Hubbards, Nova Scotia
- Halifax, Nova Scotia
- Hamilton, Ontario
- Kentville, Nova Scotia
- Kingston, Ontario
- Kitchener, Ontario
- Langford, British Columbia
- London, Ontario
- Lunenburg, Nova Scotia
- Medicine Hat, Alberta
- Milton, Ontario
- Mississauga, Ontario
- Moncton, New Brunswick
- Montreal, Quebec
- Niagara-on-the-Lake, Ontario
- North Saanich, British Columbia
- North Dumfries Township, Ontario
- Oak Bay, British Columbia
- Oakville, Ontario
- Orangeville, Ontario
- Oshawa, Ontario
- Owen Sound, Ontario
- Parrsboro, Nova Scotia, until 2012
- Pictou, Nova Scotia
- Picton, Ontario
- Pinware, Labrador
- Port Colborne, Ontario
- Port Hope, Ontario
- Redwater, Alberta
- Regina, Saskatchewan
- Rivers, Manitoba
- Riverview, New Brunswick
- Saanich, British Columbia
- Shelburne, Nova Scotia
- Sioux Lookout, Ontario
- Sooke, British Columbia
- St. Catharines, Ontario
- Stellarton, Nova Scotia
- Stewiacke, Nova Scotia
- Summerside, Prince Edward Island
- Thunder Bay, Ontario
- Toronto, Ontario
- Trenton, Ontario
- Vaughan, Ontario - Used to be hosted by the MP, now municipal event since 2023.
- Victoria, British Columbia
- Waterloo, Ontario
- Windsor, Ontario
- Winnipeg, Manitoba
- Woodstock, New Brunswick
- Yarmouth, Nova Scotia

== Military levées ==
The levée has a long tradition in the Canadian Armed Forces as one of the activities associated with New Year's Day. Military commanders garrisoned throughout Canada held local levées since, as commissioned officers, they were expected to act on behalf of the Crown on such occasions.

On Vancouver Island (the base for the Royal Navy's Pacific Fleet), levées began in the 1840s.

Today, members of the various Canadian Forces units and headquarters across Canada receive and greet visiting military and civilian guests on the first day of the new year.

In military messes, refreshments take a variety of forms: moose milk (with rum often substituted for whisky); the special flaming punch of the Royal Canadian Hussars of Montreal; the Atholl brose of the Seaforth Highlanders of Vancouver; Little Black Devil cocktails (dark rum and crème de menthe) of the Royal Winnipeg Rifles. Members of Le Régiment de Hull use sabres to uncork bottles of champagne.

== Other countries ==
A similar event, called in Danish the Nytårskur, is held each year at Christiansborg Palace by the Danish monarch.

== Fictional references ==
In literary fiction, levées form an important background to plot development in Neal Stephenson's Baroque Cycle trilogy.
