= Peter Bredsdorff =

Danish architect and urban planner (1913–1981)

Christian Erhardt Bredsdorff, commonly known as Peter Bredsdorff, (1913–1981) was a Danish architect and urban planner who is remembered for his Finger Plan for the development of Copenhagen. In this connection, his name is included in the Danish Culture Canon.

== Early life ==
After matriculating from high school in 1932, Bredsdorff studied architecture and urban planning at the Royal Danish Academy of Fine Arts under Steen Eiler Rasmussen, winning the grand gold medal in 1935.

== Career ==
After working for Steen Eiler Rasmussen from 1935 to 1942, Bredsdorff opened his own studio in 1940. He headed the first planning office for the urban development of Copenhagen from 1949 to 1952 and became a professional member of the urban development committee as well as head of the secretariat. In 1955, he was appointed urban planning architect for Copenhagen Municipality and head of the newly established general planning department. From 1955 to 1973, he was a professor at the Academy's architecture school specializing in urban planning.

In addition to his official responsibilities, Bredsdorff and his firm advised and oriented a large number of municipalities across Denmark, frequently responding to planning competitions. In collaboration with the landscape architect Sven-Ingvar Andersson, his firm drew up a plan for a completely new urban development in Gullestrup near Herning. Bredsdorff's most influential period was from 1947 to 1955 when he was involved in planning urban developments for the city of Copenhagen and for Copenhagen Municipality.

== Awards ==
Bredsdorff was awarded the C. F. Hansen Medal in 1973 for his outstanding contribution to architecture.
