= Moose milk (cocktail) =

Canadian alcoholic mixed drink

Moose milk is a traditional Canadian alcoholic mixed drink with roots in the historic celebratory events of the Canadian Armed Forces. It is also served at the levée, a New Year's Day celebration held all levels of the Canadian governmental administrations to honour the member of the armed forces, from the federal level to municipalities. The term was first recorded used to describe the cocktail in the 1915–1920.

== Culture ==
The Royal Canadian Navy, Royal Canadian Air Force, and Canadian Army all claim as the originator of the drink.

Events or parties held in the Royal Canadian Navy serving moose milk, are known as "moosers". The navy also serves the drink on-board on Sundays while the ships are in port, the phrase "moose is loose" is used to refer to the presence of the drink at various locations (e.g. "The moose is loose in the main cafeteria").

== Components ==
Moose milk is composed of five different classes of ingredients:

- Spirit: typically a combination of Canadian whisky, vodka, or dark rum
- Coffee beverage: Kahlúa and occasionally prepared coffee
- Dairy: a combination of whole milk, cream, condensed milk, eggnog, or vanilla ice cream
- Sweetener: maple syrup or sugar
- Spice: nutmeg and occasionally cinnamon

Egg yolks are sometimes used directly or indirectly through eggnog or ice cream to prevent separation of the drink.

== See also ==
- Caribou: A mix of red wine, maple syrup, and Canadian whisky. Similar roots to moose milk.
- White tiger's milk — an English alcoholic beverage
