= Tigermilk (musical project) =

- Origin: Santiago, Chile
- Genres: Experimental music, Alternative music
- Years active: 2005–2012
- Labels: Independent
- Members: Kuky Tala
- Website: tigermilk.bandcamp.com

Tigermilk is the solo project of Chilean singer-songwriter Paulina "Kuky" Tala. It was started in 2005, and in 2006 Tigermilk's debut EP The Departure"was released, followed by the 2007 album Social Songs from the Woods. As an independent project based in Santiago, Tigermilk has released several other songs as downloadable content on Myspace and Bandcamp. Tala cites Suzanne Vega, Kings of Convenience, Múm, The Cardigans, Cocteau Twins, The Cranberries, Zero 7, and Lemon Jelly as her influences.

In 2011, the album Turi was under production, with the track "Talátur" being released the same year. The album featured collaborations with a number of international artists: Paul Arnusch (Faunts, The Whitsundays) recorded the backing vocals for "Talátur", while Nathan Larsons from the Swedish-American band A Camp produced the song in his New York City studio. The final touches for the track were made in Los Angeles by producer Tom Biller (Warpaint, Karen O, Beck, etc.).

Since 2012, the project has been on hiatus.

== Discography ==
=== Studio albums ===
- Social Songs from the Woods (2007)

=== Compilations and EPs ===
- The Departure (2006)
- Turi (2011)
