= Ejnar Dyggve =

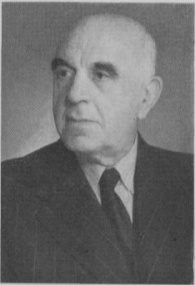
Ejnar Dyggve in 1958

Ejnar Dyggve (17 October 1887 in Liepāja, Russian Empire - 6 August 1961 in Copenhagen) was a Danish architect and archeologist. He worked extensively on Croatian pre-Romanesque art and architecture starting in 1922 during an expedition to Salona in Dalmatia, Croatia. He was a member of the Serbian Academy of Sciences and Arts, and became honorary citizen of Solin.
