= White Tiger's Milk =

English alcoholic mixed drink

White Tiger's Milk is a traditional English alcoholic beverage that usually contains brandy, eggs and milk.

A recipe was published in the 1862 book How to Mix Drinks, or The Bon-Vivant’s Companion, which described a recipe in the possession of American politician Thomas Dunn English. The recipe used apple-jack, peach brandy, an aromatic tincture, milk, and egg-white, and was sweetened with white sugar. The aromatic tincture was made of ginger, cinnamon, orange peel, valerian, and alcohol.

White Tiger's Milk was mentioned in the 1934 novel Work of Art by American writer Sinclair Lewis as an example of an old-fashioned and now forgotten drink. In a book detailing the history of San Francisco's historic Cliff House, White Tiger's Milk is given as an example of mixed drinks that were popular in the late 19th century, and described as "a creamy blend of milk, brandy, apricot brandy, and bitters".

== See also ==
- Moose milk — a Canadian cocktail
- leche de tigre — the name for ceviche marinade that is served alongside the dish
- Tiger nut - an edible tuber that is used to make milky drinks such as horchata de chufa and kunu aya

== Sources ==
- Lewis, Sinclair (1934). Work of Art. Garden City, New York: Doubleday, Doran & Company, Inc.
- Hountalas, Mary Germain; Silva, Sharon (2009). The San Francisco Cliff House. Berkeley [Calif.]: Ten Speed Press. ISBN 978-1-58008-995-1.
- Thomas, Jerry (1862). How to Mix Drinks, Or, The Bon-vivant's Companion. New York: Dick & Fitzgerald.
- Thomas, Jerry (2015). The classic guide to cocktails. Stroud, England: Amberley. ISBN 978-1-4456-4726-5.
