= Caribou (drink) =

French-Canadian alcoholic beverage

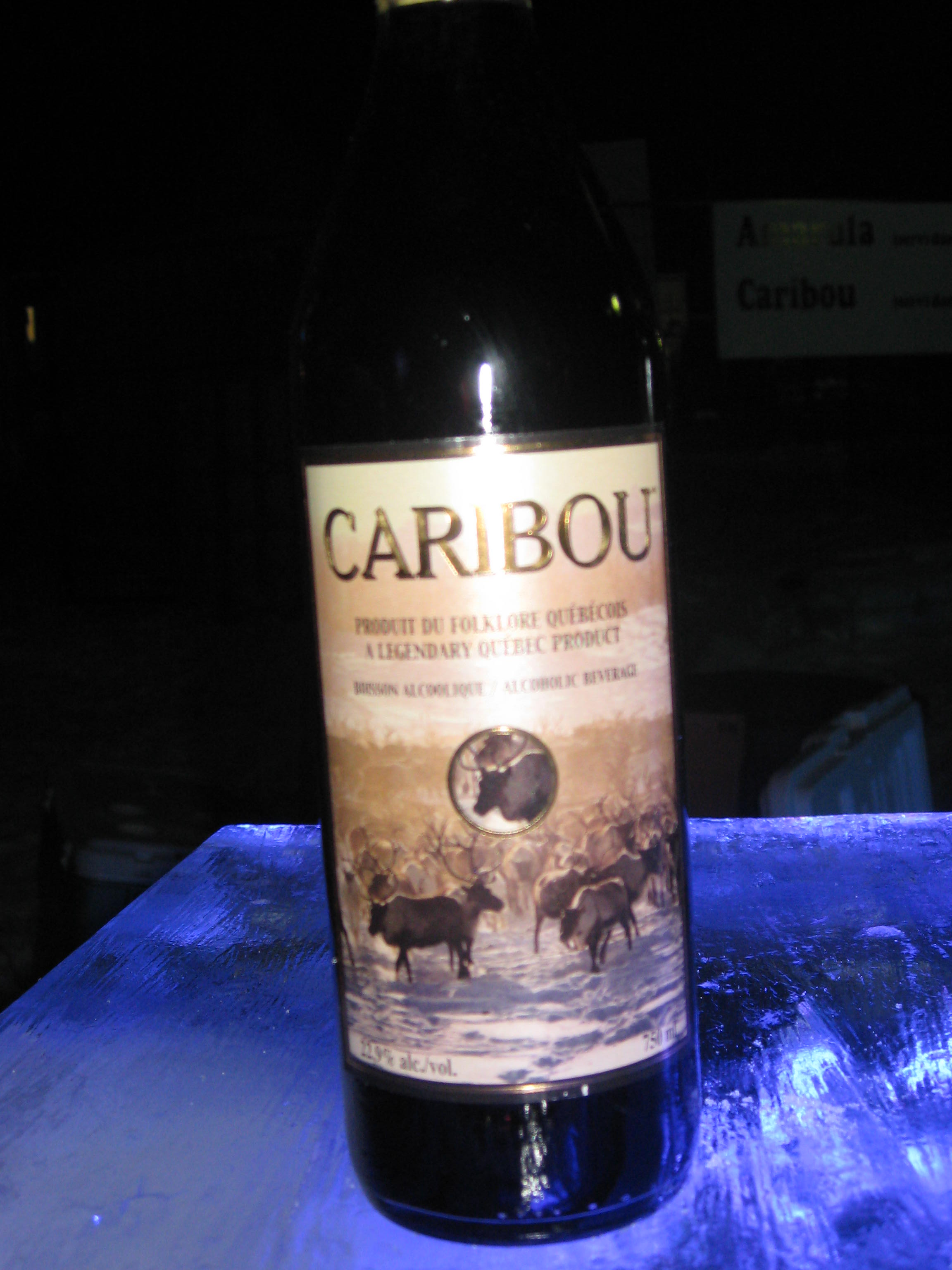
Caribou

Caribou is a sweet French-Canadian alcoholic beverage composed of red wine and a spirit (usually rye whisky) (mixed 3 parts to 1), and maple syrup or sugar.

Caribou can be made at home but is now available as a premixed beverage by the Société des alcools du Québec. It can be consumed hot or cold depending on the weather and served with citrus and cinnamon in the manner of mulled wine. Cloves and nutmeg are also commonly added to flavour the drink.

The drink has been traditionally served at the Quebec Winter Carnival, where it is carried around by carnival goers in hollow plastic walking canes or available at outdoor bars at the event. In recent years, it has also been served in celebration on the National holiday of Quebec. It is also a staple of the Festival du Voyageur in Winnipeg, Manitoba, where it is sometimes served in glasses made out of ice.

== Origins ==
Caribou is supposed to have derived its name from a drink consisting of a mixture of caribou blood and whisky which was consumed by hunters and loggers in colonial times to stave off the cold when working.

== See also ==
- Le Sang du caribou ("Caribou/reindeer blood")
- Conditum Paradoxum
- Hippocras
- Mulled wine
- Negus (drink)
- Sangria
