= Cristina Navarro Campos =

Valencian entomologist (born 1979)

Cristina Navarro
- Born: 1979 (age 46–47); València

Cristina Navarro Campos (València, 1979) is a Valencian entomologist.

She studied both Agricultural engineering and Environmental science, becoming a doctor on Entomology with a research on how ants can prevent some plagues on citrics.

She moved to South Africa and Belgium prior to moving to València, where she does research around plagues. She has been researching plagues on tigernut plantations.
