= Horchata =

Sweet plant-based beverage

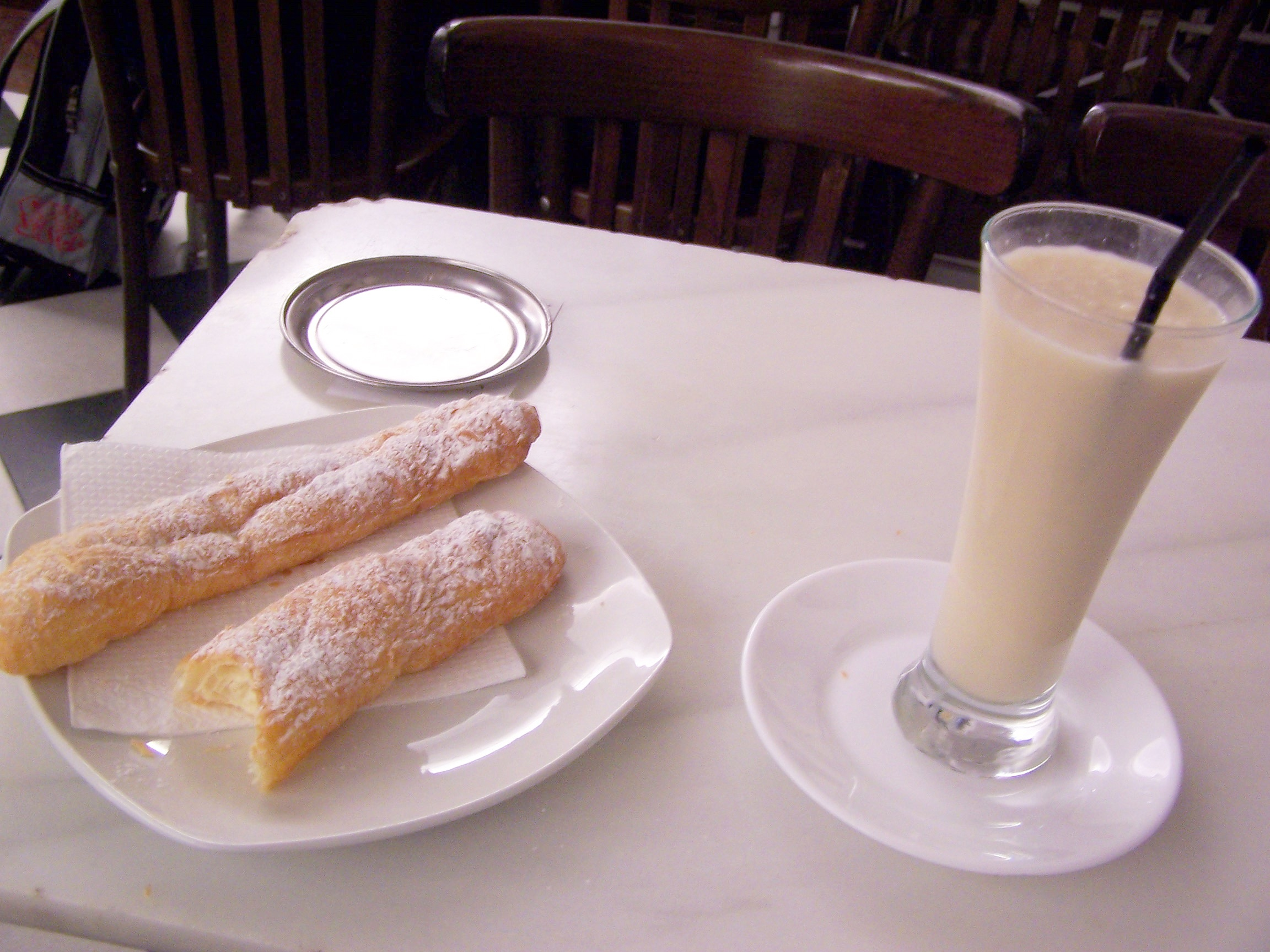
A glass of horchata de chufa with some fartons in Valencia, Spain

Horchata (/ɔːrˈtʃɑːtə/; Spanish: [oɾˈtʃata]), or orxata (Valencian: [oɾˈtʃata]), is a name given to several sweet beverages made from plant-based ingredients, although some varieties or commercial preparations contain milk. In Spain, horchata usually refers to horchata de chufa, known in Valencian as orxata de xufa, a drink made from soaked, ground and sweetened tiger nuts that is especially associated with the Valencian Community. In Mexico, horchata is typically made from rice, cinnamon and sugar, sometimes with milk or other flavourings, and is commonly served as a type of agua fresca.

== Etymology ==
The name probably derives from a Latin word for barley, the term hordeata, which in turn comes from hordeum (barley), related to a Mediterranean tradition of grain-based beverages. The Italian and Maltese orzata and the French and English orgeat have the same origin, although the beverages have diverged and are generally no longer made from barley.

== History and composition ==
=== Predecessors in antiquity ===
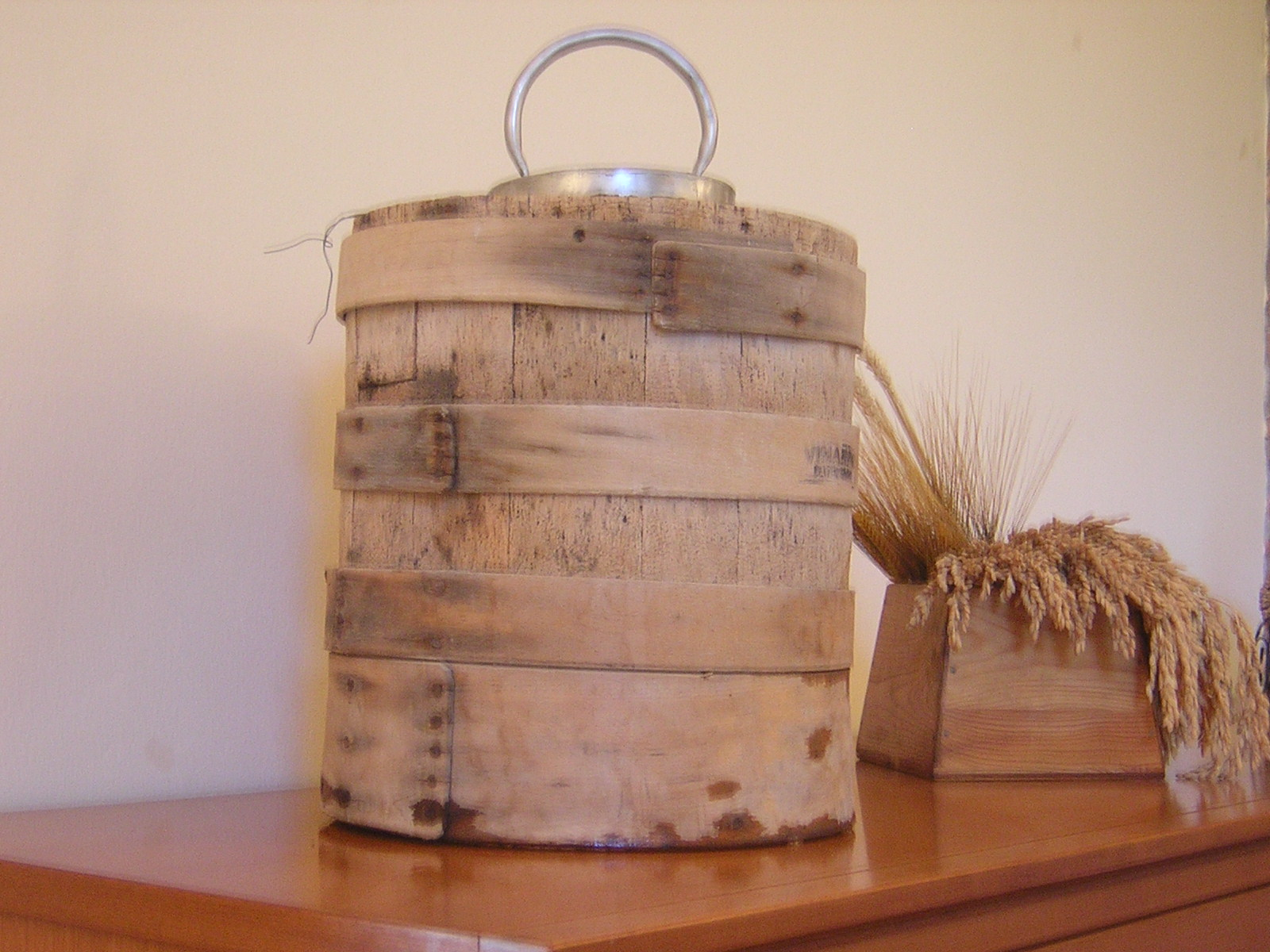
Traditional Valencian fridge horchatera

A barley drink originated in ancient Egypt, where the Romans got to know it as hordeata, from the Latin word for barley, hordeum. The main ingredient changed in time to tiger nuts, which were brought to the Iberian peninsula in the 8th century, during Muslim rule, and became a staple ingredient in the area of Valencia. It is estimated that during the 11th century it began to spread throughout Hispania (now Spain and Portugal). There are 13th-century records of an horchata-like beverage made near Valencia, where it remains a common drink.

From Spain, the concept of horchata was brought to the Americas. Drinks called agua de horchata or simply horchata came to be made with white rice and cinnamon instead of tiger nuts. Sometimes these drinks had vanilla added, or were served adorned with fruit. Similarly, flavored plant-based beverages are sold in various parts of the world as varieties of horchata or kunnu.

== Varieties ==
=== Horchata de chufa ===
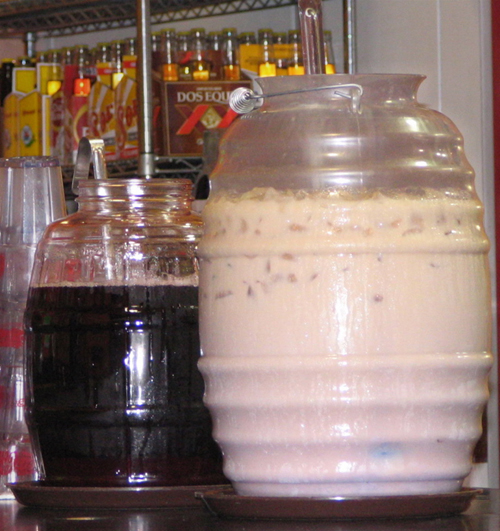
Two large jars of aguas frescas in a Seattle taquería. On the left is a jar of jamaica, and on the right is a jar of horchata.

The drink now known as horchata de chufa (also sometimes called horchata de chufas or, in West African countries such as Nigeria and Mali, kunnu aya) is made from soaked, ground and sweetened tiger nuts.

The Valencian or Chufa horchata is made with dried and sweetened tiger nuts (Cyperus esculentus). This form of horchata is now properly called orxata de xufa.

It remains popular in Spain, where a regulating council exists to ensure the quality and traceability of the product in relation to the designation of origin.

The majority of the Spanish tiger nut crop is utilised in the production of horchata de chufa. Alboraya is the most important production centre. In total, sixteen Valencian municipalities grow tiger nuts protected by the quality seal, the only one that guarantees its Valencian origin, which in aggregate covered around 485 hectares of tiger nut fields, with an approximate annual production of 8,000 tonnes, which is normally all sold by the time it is harvested.

In rare instances, various forms of aflatoxin could be present in horchata de chufa.

=== Horchata de arroz ===
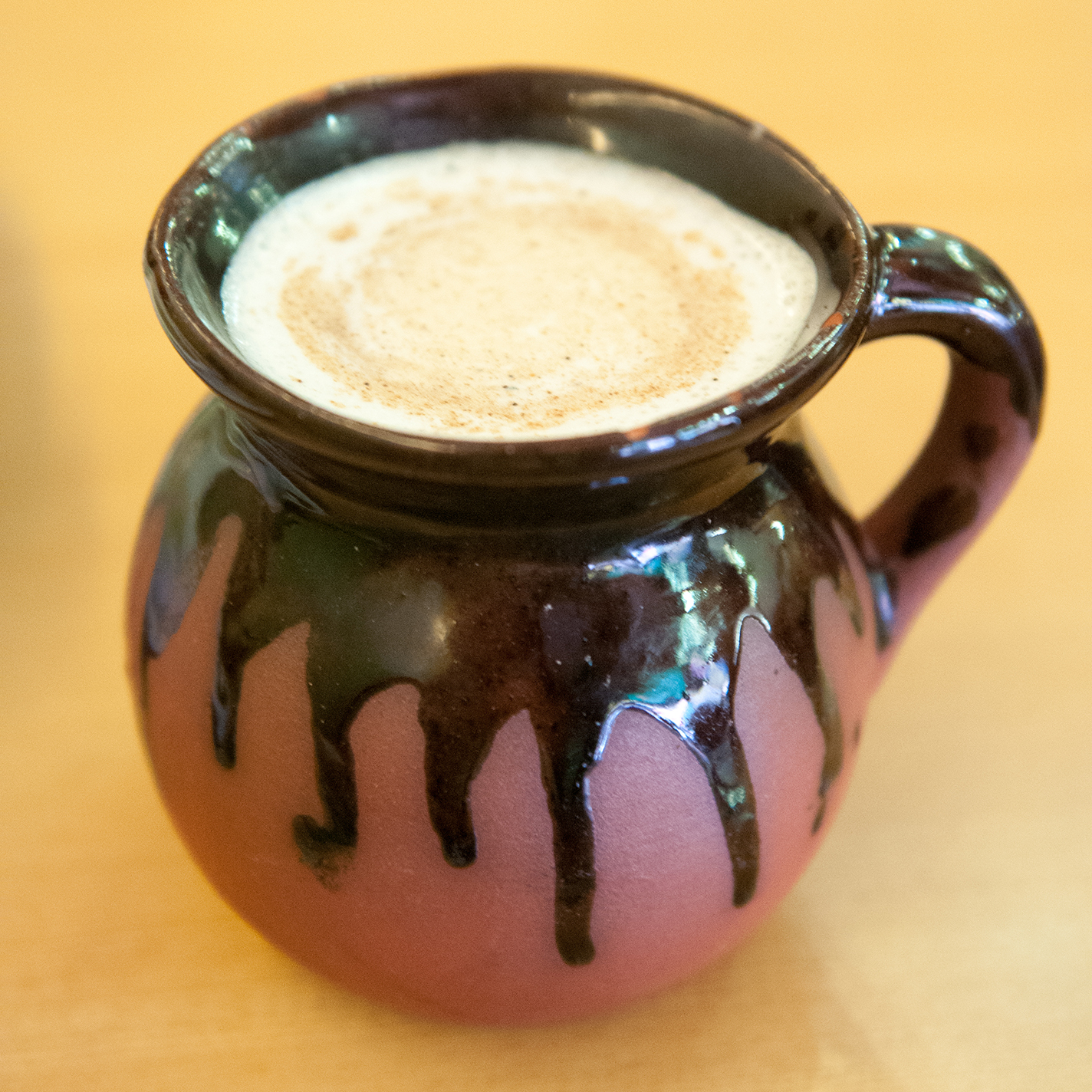
Hot horchata in Mexico

Horchata de arroz (es) (English: Rice horchata) is made of rice, sometimes with vanilla, and typically with cinnamon.

It is the most common variety of horchata in Mexico. In the United States, it is popular in taquerías and Mexican ice cream shops.

In Alvarado, horchata de arroz is scented with flowers of the Aztec marigold (cempasúchil or Tagetes erecta).

=== Horchata lojana ===
In Ecuador, horchata is a vivid red-coloured infusion or tea, consisting of some 18–20 different plants and herbs, and is most famous in the province of Loja (hence its common name of horchata lojana). Some of the herbs frequently used are escancel or bloodleaf (a type of amaranth), achiote or annatto, hibiscus, lemon verbena, lemongrass, spearmint, peppermint, chamomile, lemon balm, and rose geranium, among others. It is not at all similar to the sweet, grain-based horchatas of other Latin American countries, but simply shares the same term.

The urban and rural populaces who consume this drink, notably in the Loja province, report improved overall well-being and cognitive benefits. They also believe that this herbal infusion promotes a healthy digestive tract, improves focus and memory, and acts as an hepatic anti-inflammatory and a diuretic. There is valuable scientific evidence for the purported health benefits of each of these various ingredients—on their own and combined—including counteracting genotoxicity in the body, as well as antimicrobial and antioxidant properties.

=== Horchata de melón ===
Horchata de melón is made of ground melon seeds.

=== Horchata de morro or Semilla de jicaro ===
In the Central American countries of El Salvador, Nicaragua, Honduras, and Costa Rica, horchata refers to the drink known as horchata de morro or semilla de jicaro. Its base is made by grinding jicaro seeds, locally referred to as morro seeds, with rice.

In Nicaragua, it is also made with semilla de jicaro and rice as a base; these ingredients are toasted or dry-roasted, then ground into a fine powder. The powder is then mixed with water or milk, topped with ground cinnamon and, finally, sugar. Cocoa beans are sometimes added to the horchata, also toasted and ground with the base.

== Horchata as a flavor ==
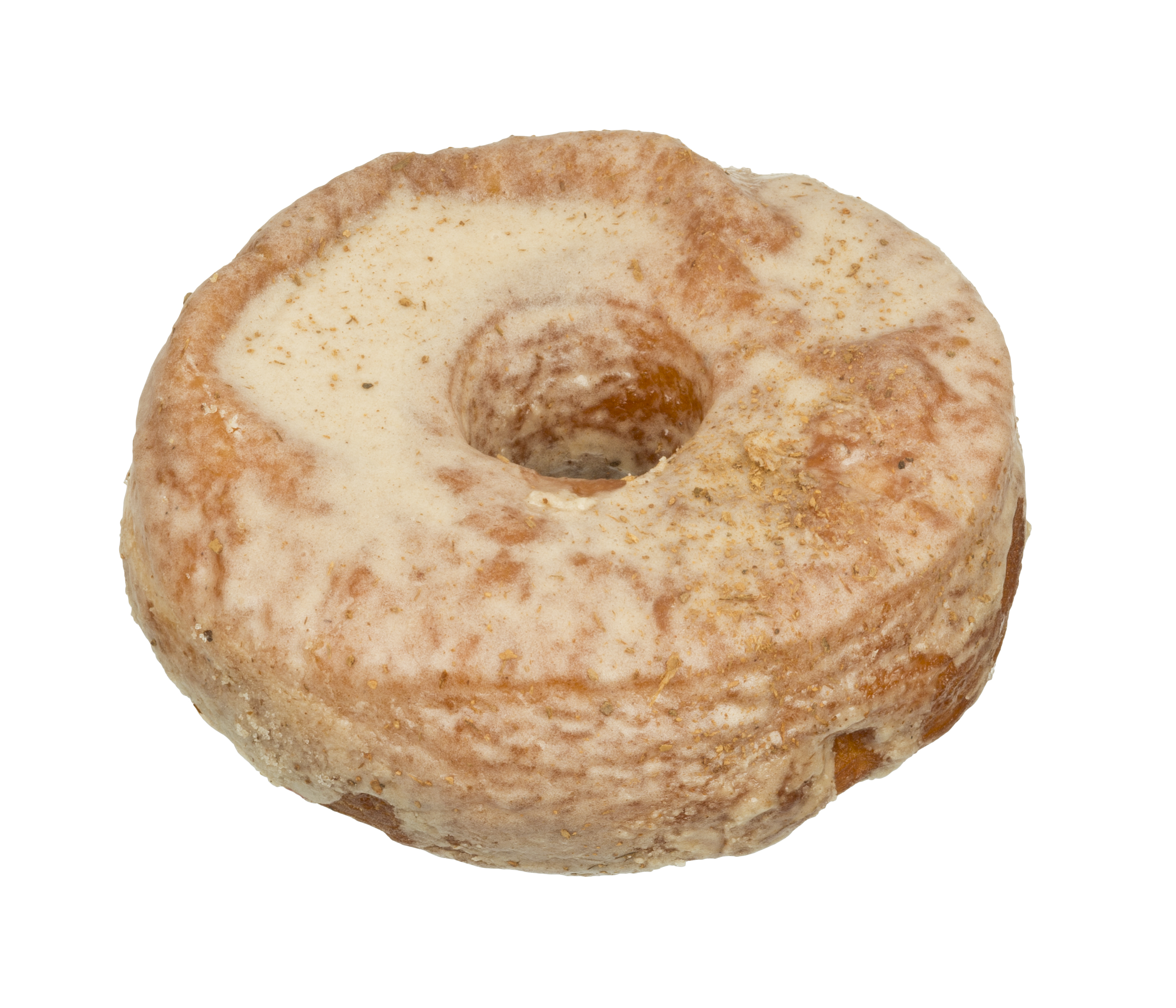
A horchata-flavored doughnut

Horchata, as a flavor, makes appearances in ice cream, cookies, and other sweets, and other products such as RumChata, an alcoholic tribute to the beverage. Some smoothie shops, cafés, and McDonald's in the U.S. have been experimenting with horchata-flavored frappés.

== See also ==
- Agua fresca
- Chicha
- Orgeat syrup
- Rice milk
- Salep
- Kunu
