= Kunu =

Nigerian beverage

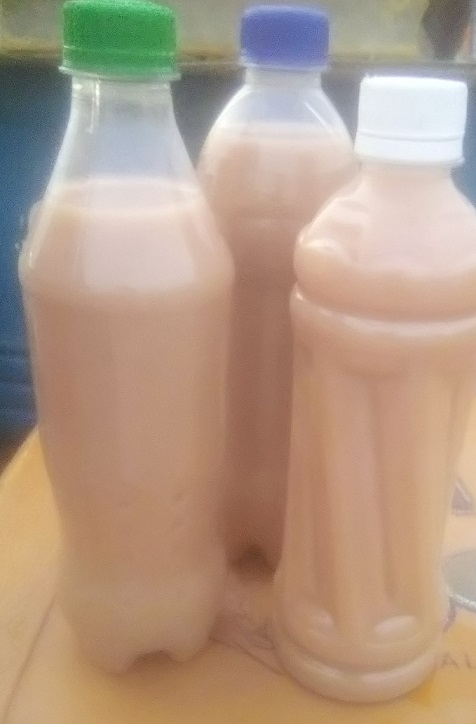
Kunu drink

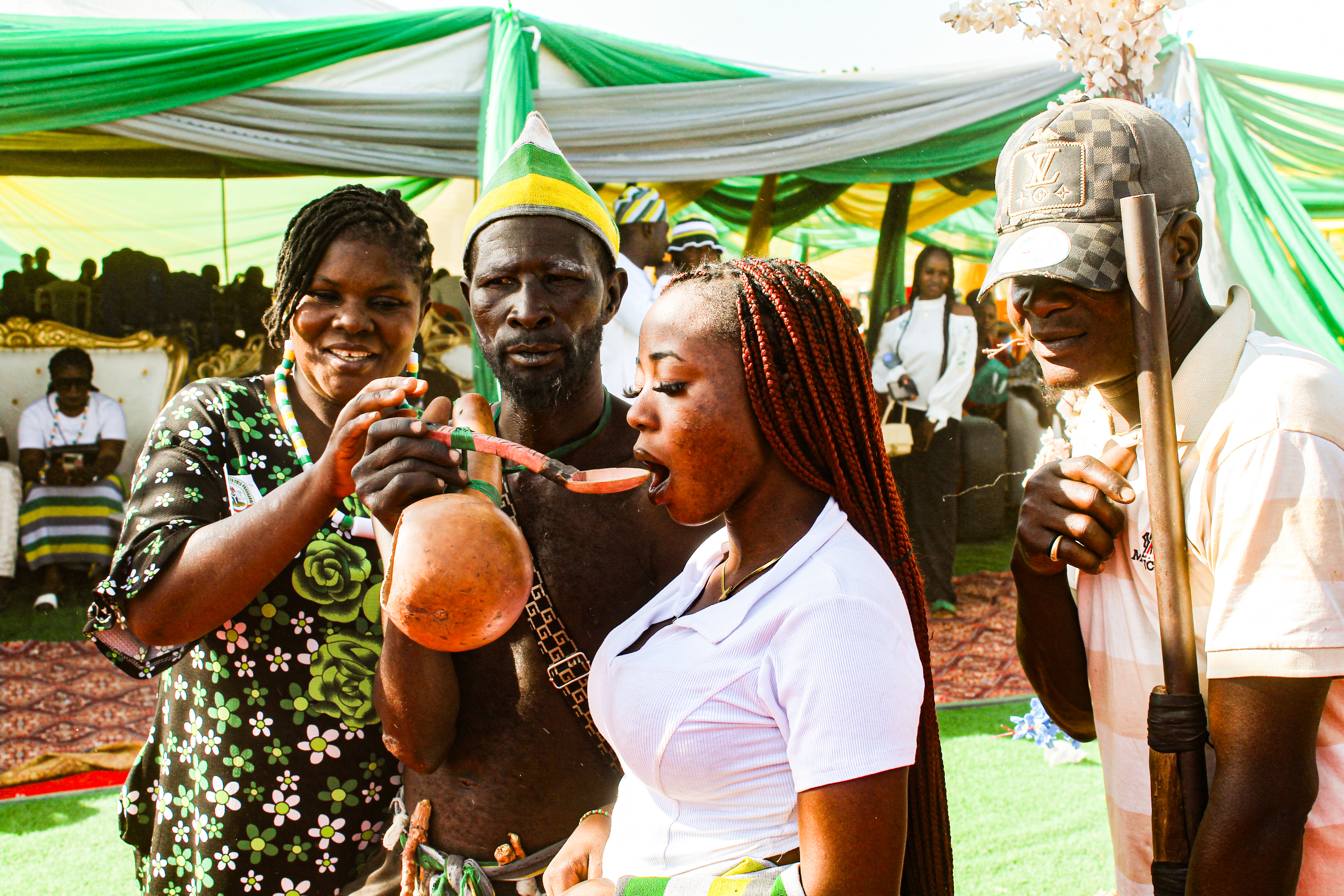
Girl drinking kunu

Kunu (also known as kunu zaki or kunu aya) is a popular drink consumed throughout Nigeria, mostly in the North. Kunu aya is made from the tiger nut, while kunu zaki is usually made from a grain such as millet or sorghum, although it can be made from maize as well. The variety of the drink made from sorghum is a milky light-brown colour, whilst that which is made from millet and maize is whitish in colour.

== Preparation ==
Kunu is made by first soaking the seeds in water for a few hours or days and blending the soaked grain with sweet potatoes and ginger or pepper to form a smooth paste. This paste is then divided into two parts. One part is placed in a vessel and has boiling water poured on it, then it is stirred to give a thick mixture. The other part of the paste is then added to this mixture and it is stirred some more. The mixture is then left for a day or two for the grain husk to settle. After this, the husk and other sediment are filtered out of the mixture, and the filtered liquid is bottled for consumption. This type of kunu is normally referred to as "kunu zaki" the one containing sugar.

== Kunu Aya ==
Kunu aya or ofio in Nigeria, also known as tiger nut drink or tiger nut milk, is a Nigerian drink made from tiger nuts. It is also known as kunu aya.

The major ingredients used in making the drink are tiger nut, dates, and coconut. Cinnamon, coffee, vanilla essence, sugar and honey are also added to give a unique taste and preserve the freshness of the drink. It is naturally dairy-free, gluten-free, and vegan.

Chaff are removed from the blended tiger nut. Tiger nut drink is served cold and must be consumed within 3 days if refrigerated.

== Kunu Tsamiya ==
This is specifically made from tsamiya (tamarind) and is also use as drink in Hausa communities during naming, marriage and any other types of coronations.

Kunu, can be made from "Aya" (tiger nuts), "Gero" (sorghum), "Dawa" (millet) and "Gyada" (peanuts/groundnuts). It's normally made for sales or serve in many Nigerians' traditional ceremonies especially in the northern and north central part of Nigeria.

== Research/Experiments ==
In a research study, Kunu was administered to laboratory rats to determine its effects on the rats' epididymis, testes size and sperm count. The results showed that while there was a small increase in testicle weight, it slightly lowered sperm count and caused no other major changes in sperm when viewed under a microscope or in the rats’ male hormones. The researchers concluded that Kunu is unlikely to act as a natural male fertility supplement.

== See also ==
- Horchata

== Sources ==
- "Kunu! Recipe". cookpad.com. 10 June 2019.
