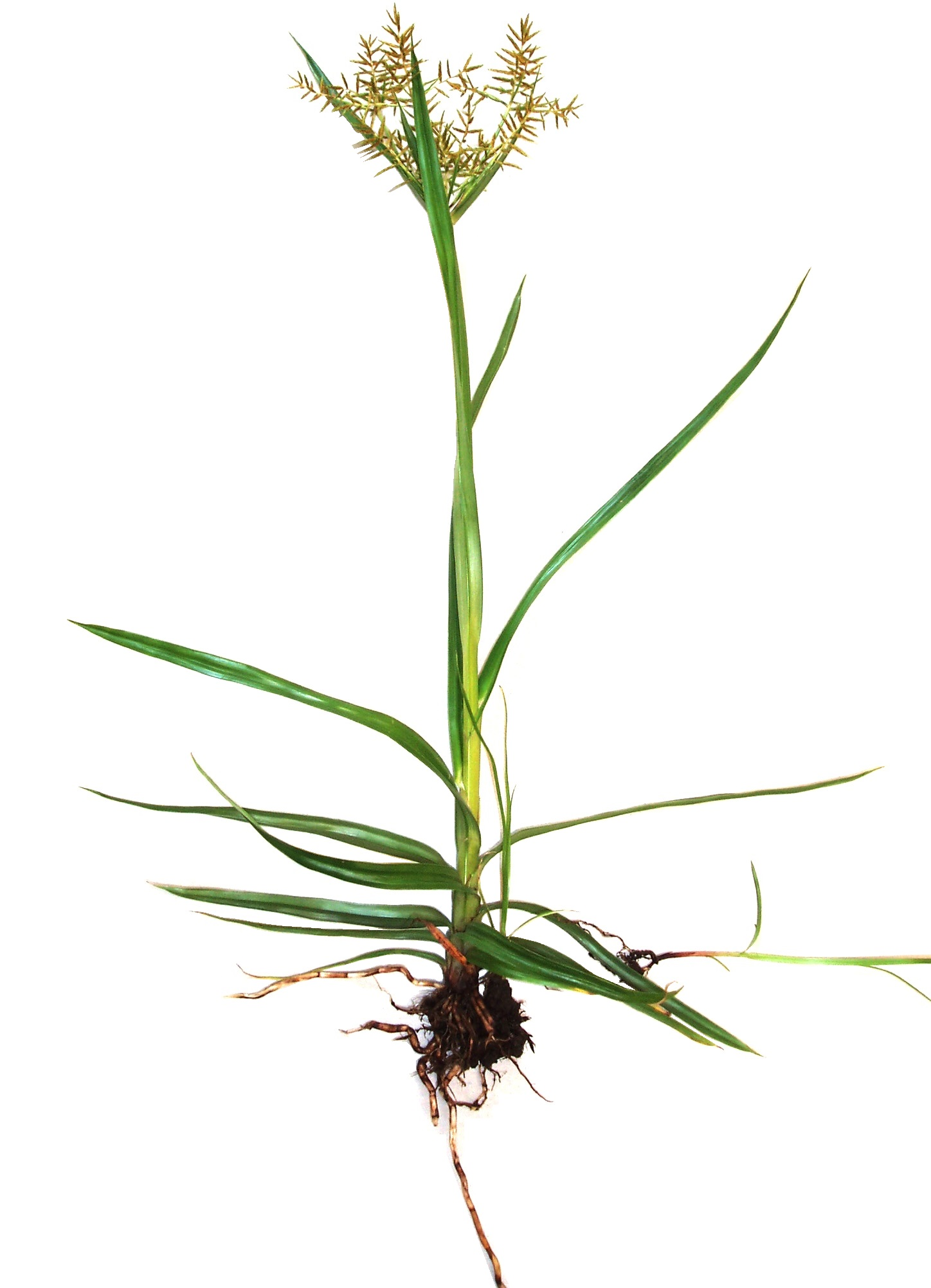

Conservation status
- Least Concern (IUCN 3.1)

Scientific classification
- Kingdom: Plantae
- Clade: Tracheophytes
- Clade: Angiosperms
- Clade: Monocots
- Clade: Commelinids
- Order: Poales
- Family: Cyperaceae
- Genus: Cyperus
- Species: C. esculentus

Binomial name
- Cyperus esculentus L.

Synonyms
- Synonymy: Chlorocyperus aureus (K.Richt.) Palla ex Kneuck.; Chlorocyperus phymatodes (Muhl.) Palla; Cyperus aureus Ten; Cyperus aureus (L.) Nyman; Cyperus bahiensis Steud.; Cyperus buchananii Boeckeler; Cyperus callistus Ridl.; Cyperus chrysostachys Boeckeler; Cyperus cubensis Steud.; Cyperus damiettensis A.Dietr.; Cyperus esculentus var. angustispicatus Britton; Cyperus esculentus f. angustispicatus (Britton) Fernald; Cyperus esculentus subsp. aureus K.Richt.; Cyperus esculentus var. cyclolepis Boeckeler ex Kük.; Cyperus esculentus f. evolutus C.B.Clarke; Cyperus esculentus var. heermannii (Buckley) Britton; Cyperus esculentus var. helodes (Schrad. ex Nees) C.B.Clarke; Cyperus esculentus var. leptostachyus Boeckeler; Cyperus esculentus var. lutescens (Torr. & Hook.) Kük. ex Osten; Cyperus esculentus var. lutescens (Torr. & Hook.) Kük.; Cyperus esculentus var. macrostachyus Boeckeler; Cyperus esculentus f. macrostachyus (Boeckeler) Fernald; Cyperus esculentus var. phymatodes (Muhl.) Kük.; Cyperus esculentus f. princeps C.B.Clarke; Cyperus esculentus var. sativus Boeckeler; Cyperus esculentus var. sprucei C.B.Clarke; Cyperus fresenii Steud.; Cyperus fulvescens Liebm.; Cyperus gracilescens Schult.; Cyperus gracilis Link; Cyperus heermannii Buckley; Cyperus helodes Schrad. ex Nees; Cyperus hydra Kunth; Cyperus lutescens Torr. & Hook.; Cyperus melanorhizus Delile; Cyperus nervosus Bertol.; Cyperus officinalis T.Nees; Cyperus pallidus Savi; Cyperus phymatodes Muhl.; Cyperus phymatodes var. heermannii (Buckley) S.Watson; Cyperus repens Elliott; Cyperus ruficomus Buckley; Cyperus scirpoides R.Br.; Cyperus sieberianus Link; Cyperus tenoreanus Schult.; Cyperus tenorei C.Presl; Cyperus tenorianus Roem. & Schult.; Cyperus tuberosus Pursh; Cyperus variabilis Salzm. ex Steud.; Pterocyperus esculentus (L.) Opiz; Pycreus esculentus (L.) Hayek

= Cyperus esculentus =

Chufa sedge

Species of grass-like plant

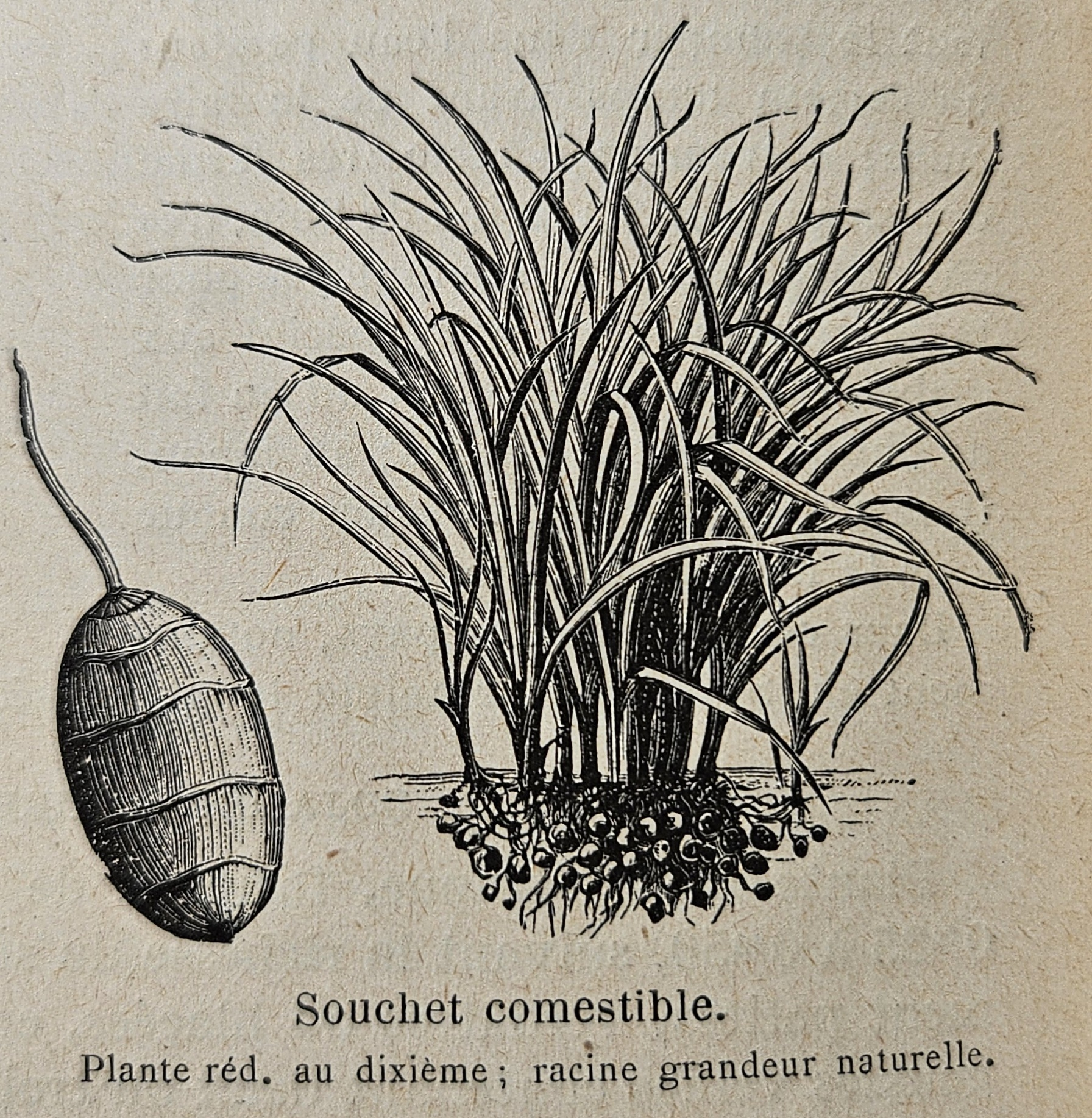
Souchet comestible in "Les plantes potagères" Vilmorin 1925

Cyperus esculentus (also called chufa, tiger nut, atadwe, yellow nutsedge, earth almond, and in Chishona, pfende) is a species of plant in the sedge family widespread across much of the world. It is found in most of the Eastern Hemisphere, including Southern Europe, Africa and Madagascar, as well as the Middle East and the Indian subcontinent. C. esculentus is cultivated for its edible tubers, called earth almonds or tiger nuts (due to the stripes on their tubers and their hard shell), as a snack food and for the preparation of horchata de chufa, a sweet, milk-like beverage.

Cyperus esculentus can be found wild, as a weed, or as a crop. It is an invasive species outside its native range, and is readily transported accidentally to become invasive. In many countries, C. esculentus is considered a weed. It is often found in wet soils such as rice paddies and peanut farms as well as well-irrigated lawns and golf courses during warm weather.

== Description ==
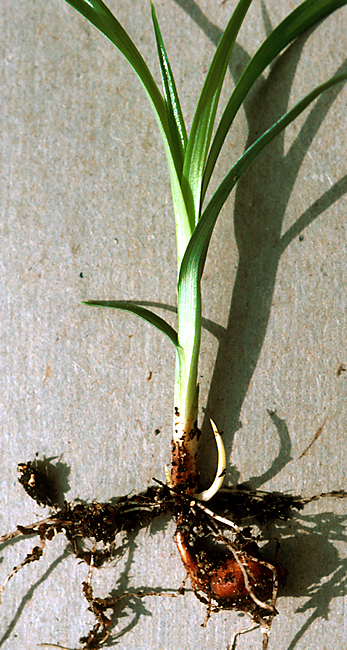
Young plant with tuber

Cyperus esculentus is an annual or perennial plant, growing to 90 centimetres (3 feet) tall, with solitary stems growing from a tuber. The plant is reproduced by seeds, creeping rhizomes, and tubers. Due to its clonal nature, C. esculentus can take advantage of soil disturbances caused by anthropogenic or natural forces. The stems are triangular in section and bear slender leaves 3–10 millimetres (1/8–3/8 inch) wide. The spikelets of the plant are distinctive, with a cluster of flat, oval seeds surrounded by four hanging, leaf-like bracts positioned 90 degrees from each other. They are 5 to 30 mm (1/4 to 1 1/8 in) long and linear to narrowly elliptic with pointed tips and 8 to 35 florets. The color varies from straw-colored to gold-brown. They can produce up to 2420 seeds per plant. The plant foliage is very tough and fibrous and is often mistaken for a grass. The roots are an extensive and complex system of fine, fibrous roots and scaly rhizomes with small, hard, spherical tubers and basal bulbs attached.

The tubers are 0.3–2.5 cm (1/8–1 in) in diameter and the colors vary between yellow, brown, and black. One plant can produce several hundred to several thousand tubers during a single growing season. With cool temperatures, the foliage, roots, rhizomes, and basal bulbs die, but the tubers survive and resprout the following spring when soil temperatures remain above 6 °C (43 °F). They can resprout up to several years later. When the tubers germinate, many rhizomes are initiated and end in a basal bulb near the soil surface. These basal bulbs initiate the stems and leaves above ground, and fibrous roots underground. C. esculentus is wind pollinated and requires cross pollination as it is self–incompatible.

=== Similar species ===
- Sedges (Cyperus) have grass-like leaves and resemble each other in the appearance. They can mainly be distinguished from grasses by their triangular stems.
- Purple nutsedge (C. rotundus) is another weedy sedge that is similar to the yellow nutsedge (C. esculentus). These two sedges are difficult to distinguish from each other and can be found growing on the same site. Some differences are the purple spikelets and the tubers formed by C. rotundus are often multiple instead of just one at the tip. In addition the tubers have a bitter taste instead of the mild almond-like flavour of C. esculentus.

== Ecology ==
Cyperus esculentus is a highly invasive species in Oceania, Mexico, some regions of the United States (where it is native), and the Caribbean, mainly by seed dispersion. It is readily transported internationally, and is adaptable to re-establish in varied climate and soil environments. In Japan, it is an exotic clonal weed favorable to establish in wet habitats. Cyperus esculentus serves as a larval host for Euphyes vestris (dun skipper) and Diploschizia impigritella (yellow nut-sedge moth) in North America. Cyperus esculentus likely reached the New World through ocean currents before the Holocene.

== Cultivation ==
Cyperus esculentus is cultivated in Egypt, Spain, Nigeria, the United States, Guatemala, Mexico, Chile, Brazil, Lebanon, Syria, Jordan, Saudi Arabia, Oman, Iran, Iraq, Pakistan, India, Yemen, Morocco, Ivory Coast, Sudan, South Sudan, Gambia, Guinea Bissau, Ghana, Niger, Burkina Faso, Togo, Benin, Cameroon, and Mali, where they are used primarily as animal feed or as a side dish, but in Hispanic countries they are used mainly to make horchata, a sweet, milk-like beverage.

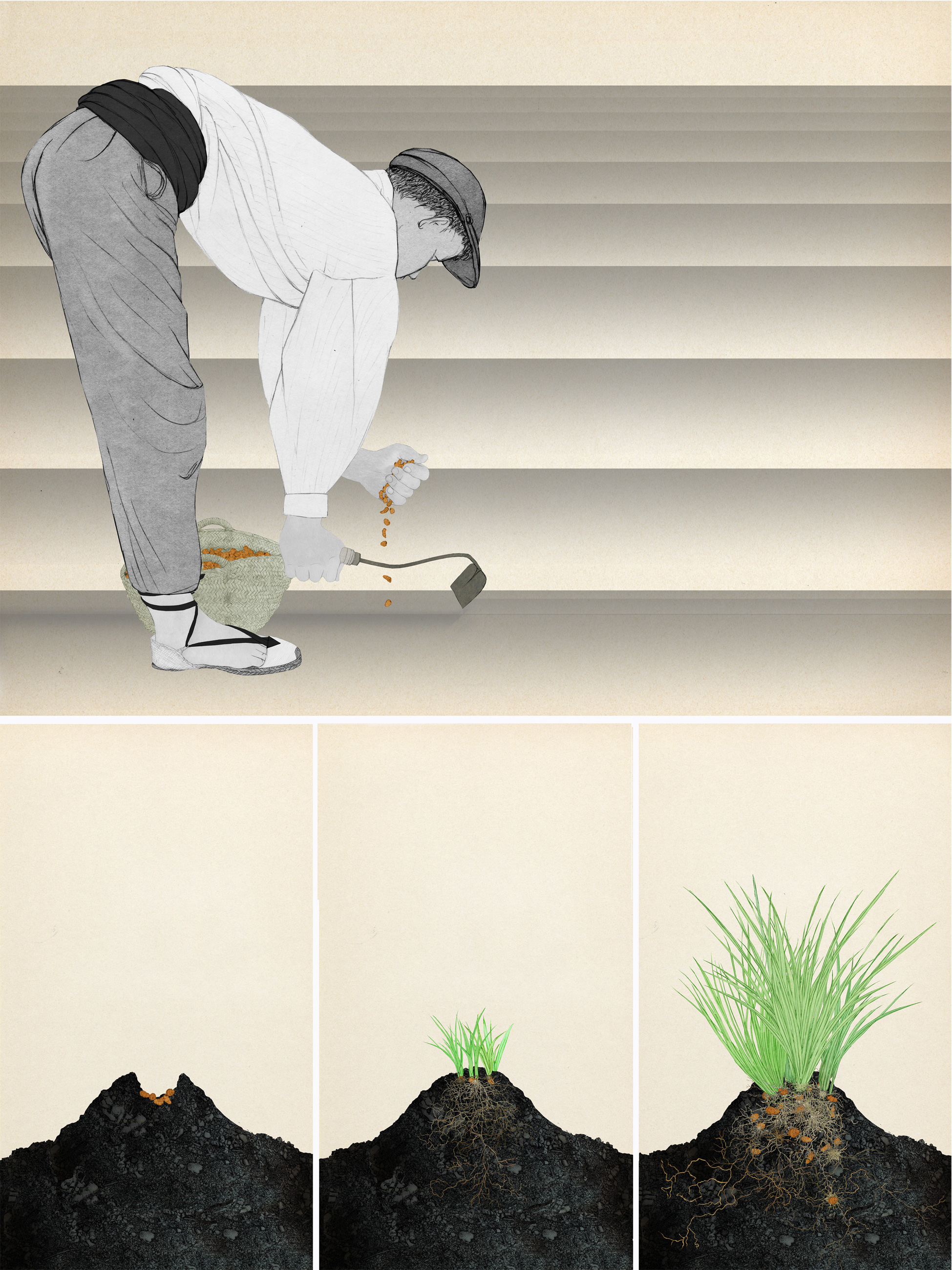
Cultivation and growing of the xufa in the Valencian Community, file by the Valencian Museum of Ethnology

=== Climate requirements ===
Cyperus esculentus cultivation requires a mild climate. Low temperature, shade, and light intensity can inhibit flowering. Tuber initiation is inhibited by high levels of nitrogen, long photoperiods, and high levels of gibberellic acid. Flower initiation occurs under photoperiods of 12 to 14 hours per day.

=== Soil requirements ===
Tubers can develop in soil depths around 30 cm, but most occur in the top or upper part. They tolerate many adverse soil conditions including periods of drought and flooding and survive soil temperatures around −5 °C (23 °F). They grow best on sandy, moist soils at a pH between 5.0 – 7.5. The densest populations of C. esculentus are often found in low-lying wetlands. They do not tolerate salinity.

=== Cultivation process ===
Cyperus esculentus is normally planted on previously tilled flat soils with ridges to facilitate irrigation. Seeds are planted manually on these ridges, which are approximately 60 cm (2 ft) apart. Distances between seeds may vary from 15 to 20 cm (6 to 8 in) and seeding depth is around 8 cm (3 in). A typical seeding rate for chufa is about 120 kg of tubers/ha (107 lbs/acre).

They are planted between April and May and must be irrigated every week until they are harvested in November and December. Tubers develop about 6–8 weeks after seedling emergence and grow quickly during July and August. The maturing is around 90–110 days. The average yield can approach between 10 and 19 t/ha.

=== Compatibility with other crops ===
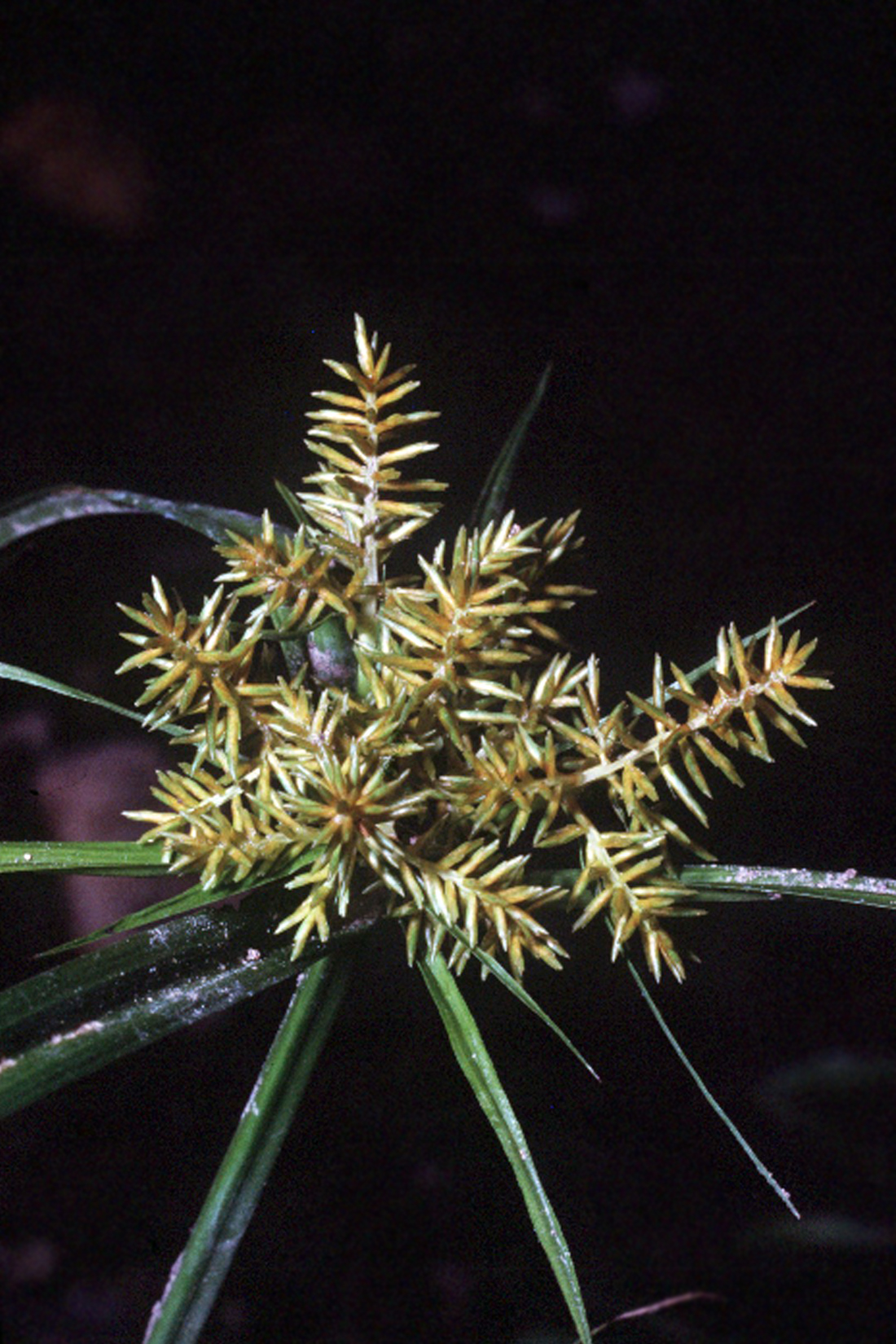
The seed head of a Cyperus esculentus plant

Cyperus esculentus is extremely difficult to remove completely once established. This is due to the plant having a stratified and layered root system, with tubers and roots being interconnected to a depth of 36 cm or more. The tubers are connected by fragile roots that are prone to snapping when pulled, making the root system difficult to remove intact. Intermediate rhizomes can reach a length of 60 cm. The plant can quickly regenerate if a single tuber is left in place. By competing for light, water and nutrients it can reduce the vigour of neighbouring plants. It can develop into a dense colony. Patch boundaries can increase by more than one meter per year. Tubers and seed disperse with agricultural activities, soil movement or by water and wind. They are often known as a contaminant in crop seeds. When plants are small they are hard to distinguish from other weeds such as Dactylis glomerata and Elytrigia repens. Thus it is hard to discover in an early stage and therefore hard to counteract. Once it is detected, mechanical removal, hand removal, grazing, damping, and herbicides can be used to inhibit C. esculentus.

=== Harvest and drying process ===

Harvest usually occurs in November or December and the leaves are scorched during the harvest. With a combine harvester, the tiger nut is pulled out of the ground. Immediately after harvesting, the tiger nuts are washed with water in order to remove sand and small stones. The drying occurs usually in the sun and can take up to three months. The temperatures and humidity levels have to be monitored very carefully during this period. The tiger nuts have to be turned every day to ensure uniform drying. The drying process ensures a longer shelf life. This prevents rot or other bacterial infections, securing quality and high nutrition levels. Disadvantages in the drying process are shrinkage, skin wrinkles and hard nut texture.

=== Storage ===
Tiger nut loses a considerable amount of water during drying and storage. The starch content of the tiger nut tubers decreases and the reducing sugar (invert sugar) content increases during storage. Tiger nut can be stored dry and rehydrated by soaking without losing the crisp texture. Soaking is often done overnight. Dried tiger nuts have a hard texture and soaking is required to render them more easily edible and to ensure acceptable sensory quality.

According to the Consejo Regulador de Chufa de Valencia (Regulating Council for Valencia's Tiger Nuts), the nutritional composition/100 ml of the Spanish beverage horchata de chufas is as follows: energy content around 66 kcal, proteins around 0.5 g, carbohydrates over 10 g with starch at least 1.9 g, fats at least 2 g.

== Uses ==
Dried tiger nut has a smooth, tender, sweet, and nutty taste. It can be consumed raw, roasted, dried, baked or as tiger nut milk, tiger nut drink or oil.

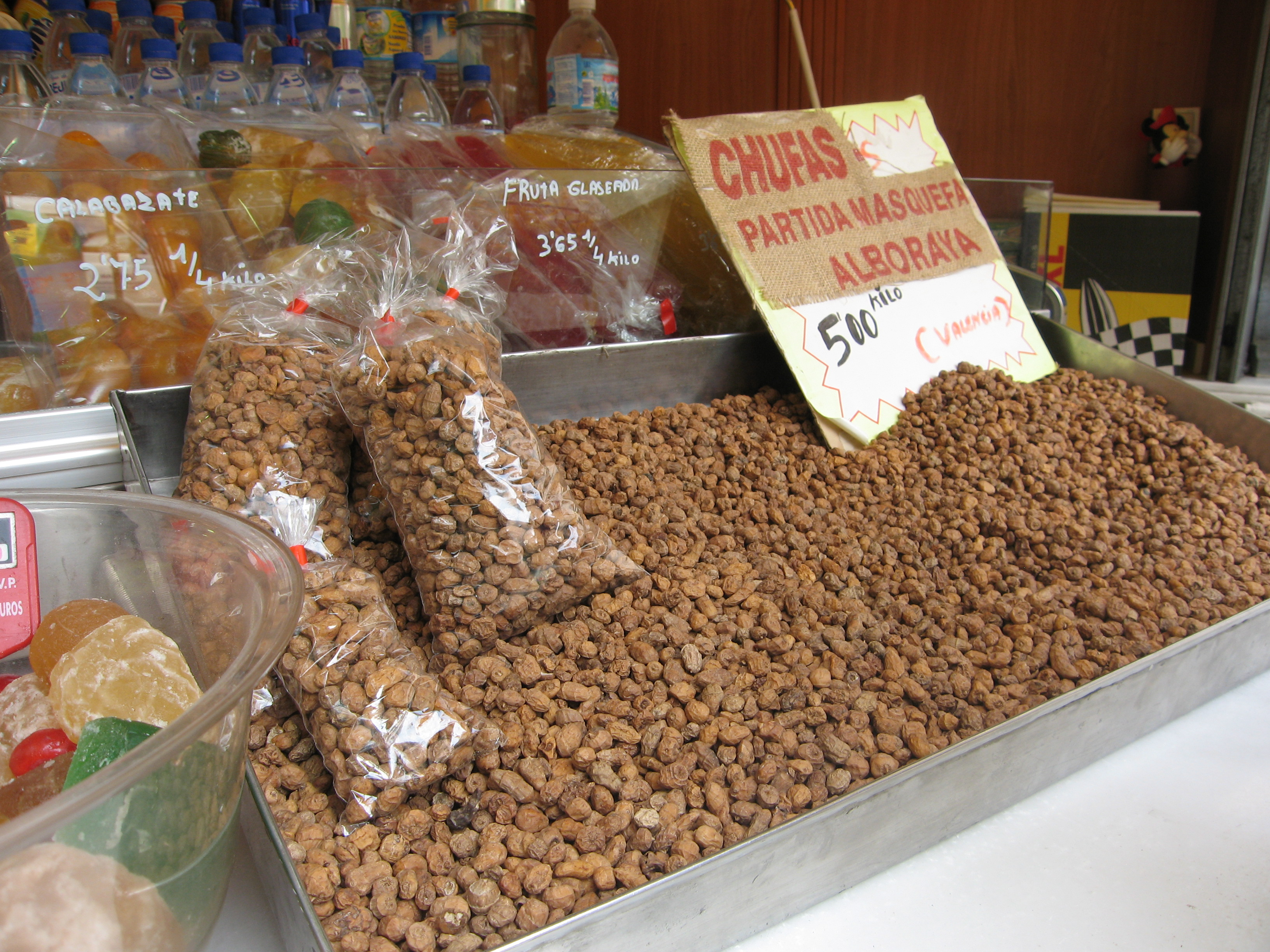
Bulk Horchata Chufas from Alboraya for sale in neighboring Valencia, Spain.

=== Drink ===
In Spain, the drink now known as horchata de chufa (also sometimes called horchata de chufas or, in West African countries such as Nigeria and Mali, kunun aya) is the original form of horchata. It is made from soaked, ground and sweetened tiger nuts mixed with sugar and water. It remains popular in Spain, where a regulating council exists to ensure the quality and traceability of the product in relation to the designation of origin. There it is served ice-cold as a natural refreshment in the summer, often served with fartons. The majority of the Spanish tiger nut crop is utilised in the production of horchata de chufa. Alboraya is the most important production centre.

The tubers can be roasted and ground into a coffee substitute.

=== Food ===
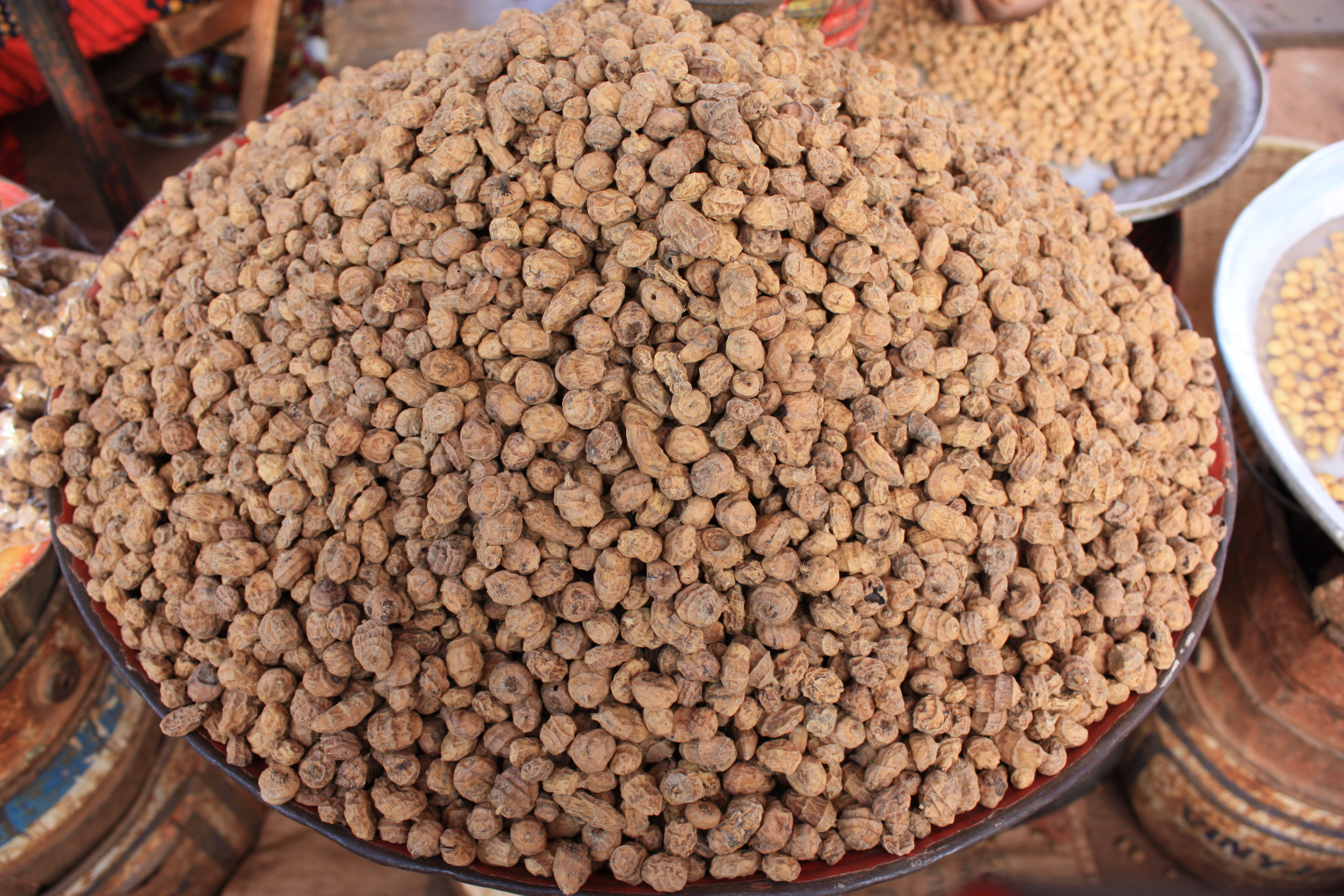
Dried tubers sold at the market of Banfora, Burkina Faso.

The tubers are edible raw or cooked. They have a slightly sweet, nutty flavour, compared to the more bitter-tasting tuber of the related Cyperus rotundus (purple nutsedge). They are quite hard and are generally soaked in water before they can be eaten, making them much softer and giving them a better texture. They are a popular snack in West Africa. The tubers can also be dried and ground into flour.

In Northern Nigeria, it is called aya and it is usually eaten fresh. It is sometimes dried and later rehydrated and eaten. A snack made by toasting the nuts and sugar coating it is popular among the Hausa children of Northern Nigeria. Also, a drink known as kunun aya is made by processing the nuts with dates and later sieved and served chilled.

In Egypt, tiger nuts are known by the name ḥab el ʿAzīz and after softening it by soaking in water, it is sold on hand carts as a street food. Its popularity was depicted in movies, such as the song named after it, "Ḥab el ʿAzīz".

Flour of roasted tiger nut is sometimes added to biscuits and other bakery products as well as in making oil, soap, and starch extracts. It is also used for the production of nougat, jam, beer, and as a flavoring agent in ice cream and in the preparation of kunu (a local beverage in Nigeria). Kunu is a nonalcoholic beverage prepared mainly from cereals (such as millet or sorghum) by heating and mixing with spices (dandelion, alligator pepper, ginger, licorice) and sugar. To make up for the poor nutritional value of kunu prepared from cereals, tiger nut was found to be a good substitute for cereal grains. Tiger nut oil can be used naturally with salads or for deep frying. It is considered to be a high-quality oil. Tiger nut "milk" has been tried as an alternative source of milk in fermented products, such as yogurt production, and other fermented products common in some African countries and can thus be useful replacing milk in the diet of people intolerant to lactose to a certain extent.

=== Oil ===
Since the tubers of C. esculentus contain 20-36% oil, it has been suggested as potential oil crop for the production of biodiesel. One study found that chufa produced 1.5 metric tonnes of oil per hectare (174 gallons/acre) based on a tuber yield of 5.67 t/ha and an oil content of 26.4%. A similar 6-year study found tuber yields ranging from 4.02 to 6.75 t/ha, with an average oil content of 26.5% and an average oil yield of 1.47 t/ha. The oil of the tuber was found to contain 18% saturated (palmitic acid and stearic acid) and 82% unsaturated (oleic acid and linoleic acid) fatty acids.

=== Fishing bait ===
The boiled nuts are used in the UK as a bait for carp. The nuts have to be prepared in a prescribed manner to prevent harm to the fish. The nuts are soaked in water for 24 hours, and then boiled for 20 minutes or longer until fully expanded. Some anglers then leave the boiled nuts to ferment for 24–48 hours, which can enhance their effectiveness. If the nuts are not properly prepared, they can be toxic to carp. This was originally thought to have been the cause of death of Benson, a large, well-known female carp weighing 54 lb (24 kg) found floating dead in a fishing lake, with a bag of unprepared tiger nuts lying nearby, empty, on the bank. An examination of the fish by a taxidermist concluded tiger nut poisoning was not the cause of death, but rather the fish had died naturally.

=== History ===
It has been suggested that the extinct hominin Paranthropus boisei (the "Nutcracker Man") subsisted on tiger nuts.

Cyperus esculentus was one of the oldest cultivated plants in prehistoric and Ancient Egypt, where it was an important food. Roots of wild chufa have been found at Wadi Kubbaniya, north of Aswan, dating to around 16,000 BC. Dry tubers also appear later in tombs of the Predynastic period, around 3000 BC. During that time, C. esculentus tubers were consumed either boiled in beer, roasted, or as sweets made of ground tubers with honey. The tubers were also used medicinally, taken orally, as an ointment, or as an enema, and used in fumigants to sweeten the smell of homes or clothing. Chufa continued to be an important source of food in the Dynastic period, and cultivation of the plant remained exclusively in Egypt. The tomb of the vizier Rekhmire from the 15th century BCE, shows peasants preparing and measuring tiger nuts to make votive cakes as offerings to the god Amun. The modern name for tiger nuts in Egypt is حب العزيز (ḥab el ʿAzīz = grains of Al-Aziz) named after the Fatimid ruler who was reputedly fond of it.

== Gallery ==
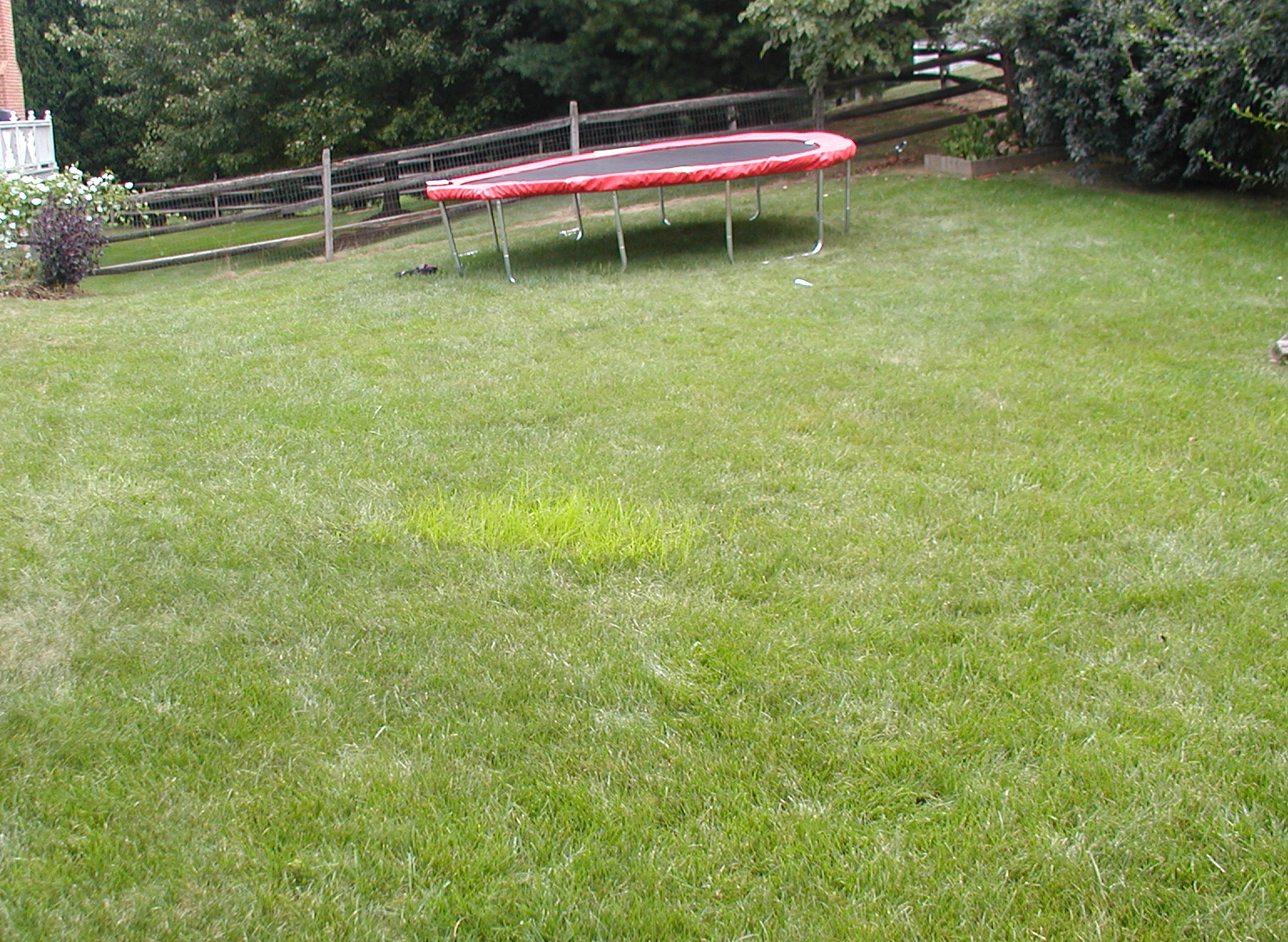

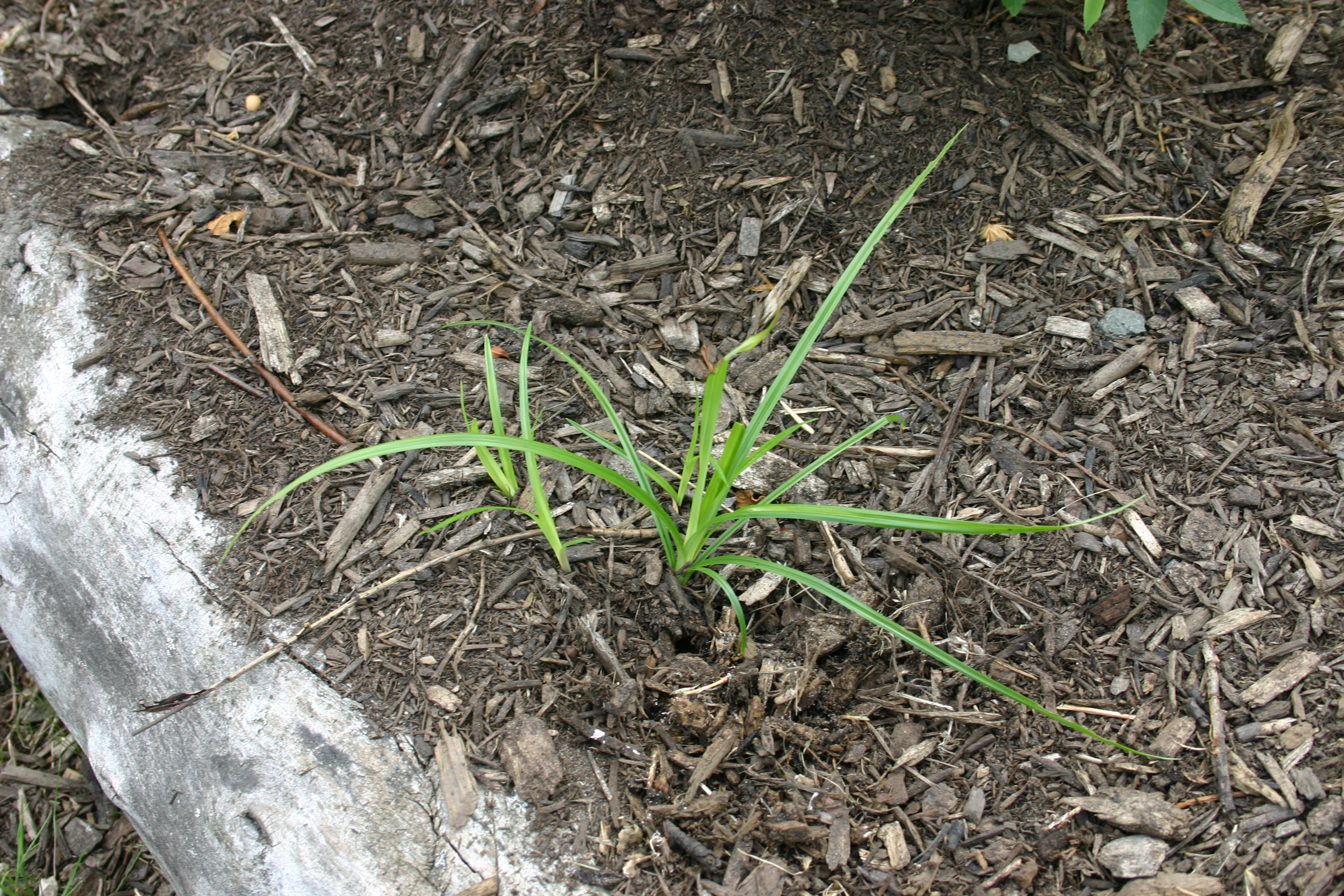

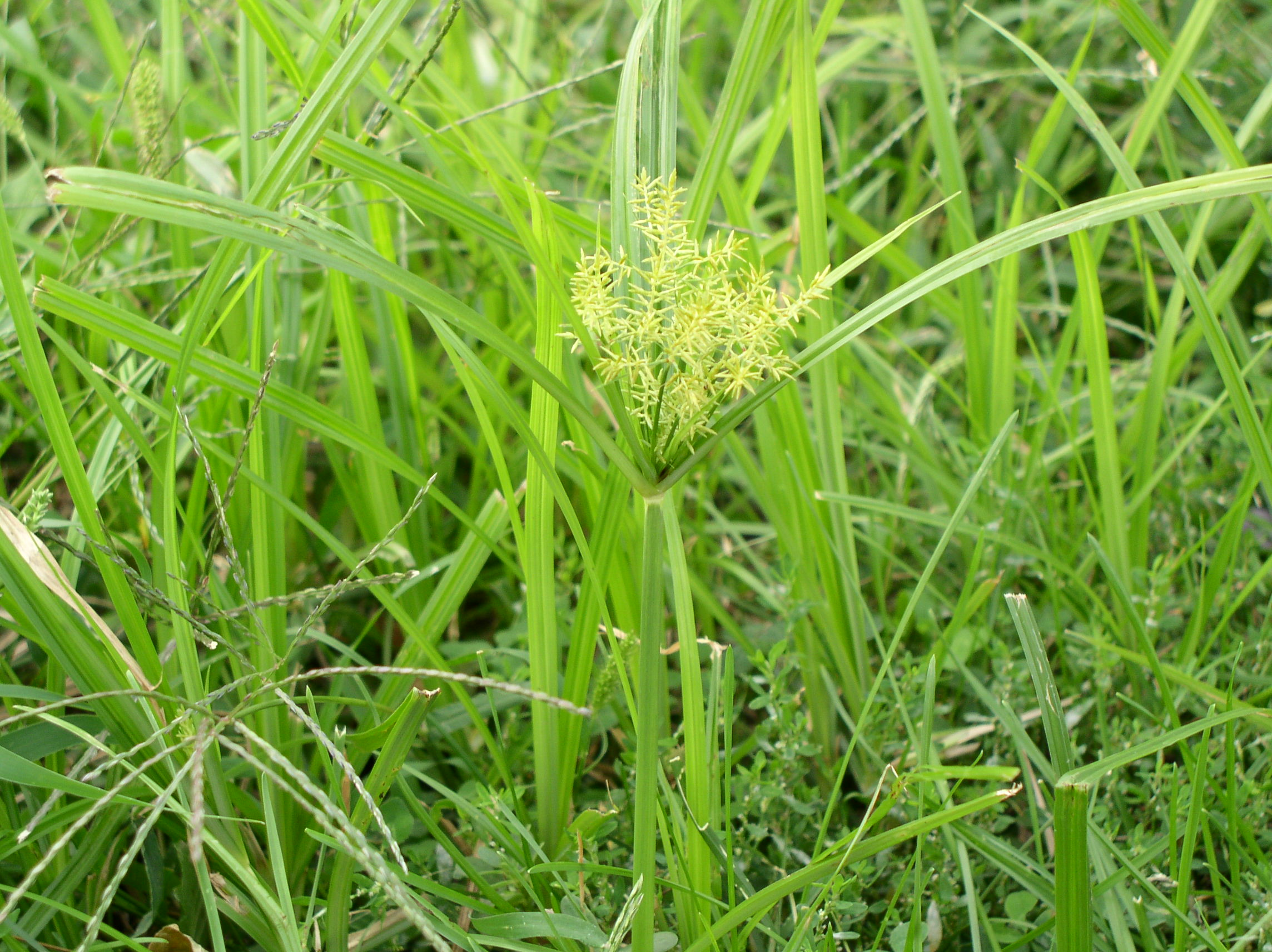

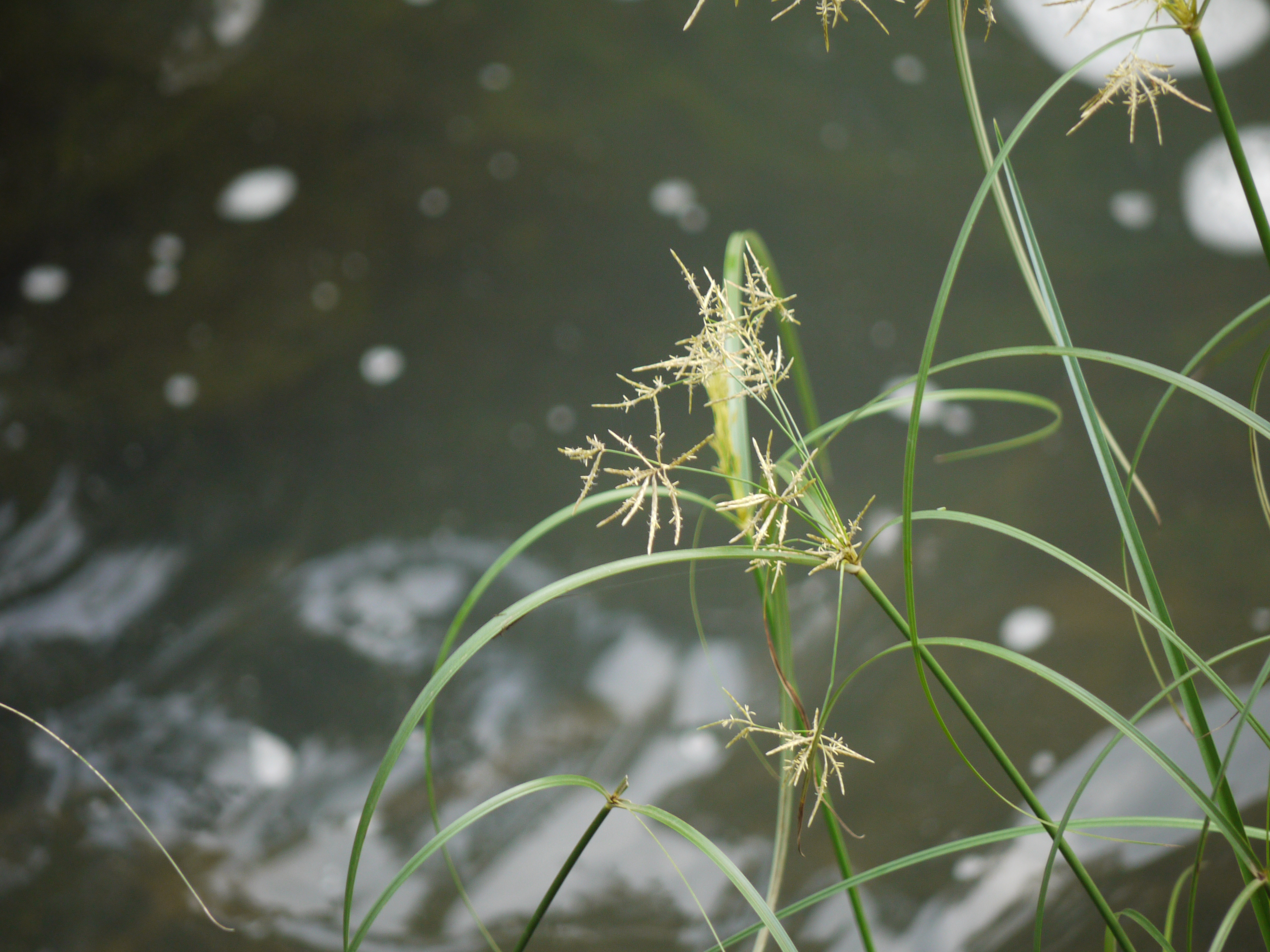
