= Rose geranium =

Rose geranium is the common name of two species of Pelargonium:

- Pelargonium graveolens, species native to the Cape Provinces and the Northern Provinces of South Africa, Zimbabwe, and Mozambique
- Pelargonium capitatum, species found in fynbos along the coast of South Africa, from Lamberts Bay in the Western Cape east to Kwazulu-Natal
